= 2022 IIHF World Championship playoff round =

Ice hockey tournament

The playoff round of the 2022 IIHF World Championship was held from 26 to 29 May 2022. The top four of each preliminary group qualified for the playoff round.

== Qualified teams ==
Group	Winners	Runners-up	Third place	Fourth place
A	Switzerland	Germany	Canada	Slovakia
B	Finland	Sweden	Czechia	United States

=== Qualified teams' seedings ===
Quarter-finalists were paired according to their positions in the groups: the first-place team in each preliminary-round group played the fourth-place team of the other group, while the second-place team played the third-place team of the other group.

Semi-finalists are paired according to their seeding after the preliminary round, which is determined by the following criteria: 1) position in the group; 2) number of points; 3) goal difference; 4) number of goals scored for; 5) seeding number entering the tournament. The best-ranked semi-finalist plays against the lowest-ranked semi-finalist, while the second-best ranked semi-finalist plays the third-best ranked semi-finalist.

Rank	Team	Grp	Pos	Pts	GD	GF	Seed
1	Switzerland	A	1	20	+19	34	8
2	Finland	B	1	19	+20	25	2
3	Sweden	B	2	18	+17	27	7
4	Germany	A	2	16	+6	26	5
5	Canada	A	3	15	+16	34	1
6	Czechia	B	3	13	+6	19	6
7	United States	B	4	13	+6	18	4
8	Slovakia	A	4	12	+4	23	9

== Bracket ==
There was a re-seeding after the quarterfinals.

Quarter-finals
26 May
1A Switzerland	0
4B United States	3
26 May
1B Finland	4
4A Slovakia	2
26 May
2A Germany	1
3B Czechia	4
26 May
2B Sweden	3
3A Canada (OT)	4

Semi-finals
28 May
2 Finland	4
7 United States	3
28 May
5 Canada	6
6 Czechia	1

Final
29 May
2 Finland (OT)	4
5 Canada	3
Third place
29 May
6 Czechia	8
7 United States	4

All times are local (UTC+3).

== Quarterfinals ==
=== Germany vs Czechia ===
26 May 2022; 16:20	Germany	1–4 (0–2, 0–1, 1–1)	Czechia	Helsinki Ice Hall, Helsinki; Attendance: 4,290

Game reference

Philipp Grubauer
Goalies
Karel Vejmelka
Referees:
(Sweden) Mikael Nord
(Switzerland) Miroslav Stolc
Linesmen:
(Canada) Maxime Chaput
(Slovakia) Šimon Synek

	0–1	02:17 – Pastrňák (Krejčí, Červenka) (PP)
	0–2	10:04 – Červenka (Krejčí, Hronek) (PP)
	0–3	32:10 – Krejčí (Pastrňák, Červenka) (PP)
Seider (Noebels, Plachta) (EA) – 53:48	1–3
	1–4	58:10 – Smejkal (Kämpf) (EN)

8 min
Penalties
6 min
22
Shots
24

=== Sweden vs Canada ===
26 May 2022; 16:20	Sweden	3–4 OT (2–0, 1–0, 0–3) (OT: 0–1)	Canada	Tampere Deck Arena, Tampere; Attendance: 8,576

Game reference

Linus Ullmark
Goalies
Chris Driedger
Referees:
(Finland) Lassi Heikkinen
(United States) Jake Rekucki
Linesmen:
(Finland) Hannu Sormunen
(Czech Republic) Josef Špůr

Klingberg (Lang, Peterson) – 01:27	1–0
Nylander (Nordström) – 07:04	2–0
Friberg (Gustafsson, Ekman-Larsson) – 28:23	3–0
	3–1	41:21 – Graves (Roy, Comtois)
	3–2	58:07 – Dubois (Chabot, Cozens) (PP, EA)
	3–3	58:37 – Barzal (Batherson, Comtois) (EA)
	3–4	60:43 – Batherson (Barzal, Dubois) (PP)

6 min
Penalties
10 min
19
Shots
42

=== Switzerland vs United States ===
26 May 2022; 20:20	Switzerland	0–3 (0–2, 0–0, 0–1)	United States	Helsinki Ice Hall, Helsinki; Attendance: 3,727

Game reference

Leonardo Genoni
Goalies
Jeremy Swayman
Referees:
(Latvia) Andris Ansons
(Sweden) Linus Öhlund
Linesmen:
(Denmark) Andreas Krøyer
(Canada) Nathan van Oosten

0–1	11:59 – Meyers (Bellows, Hughes) (PP)
0–2	16:42 – Gaudette (Peeke)
0–3	54:06 – Meyers (Kuhlman, Farrell)

2 min
Penalties
4 min
33
Shots
22

=== Finland vs Slovakia ===
26 May 2022; 20:20	Finland	4–2 (1–2, 1–0, 2–0)	Slovakia	Tampere Deck Arena, Tampere; Attendance: 11,341

Game reference

Juho Olkinuora
Goalies
Adam Húska
Referees:
(Canada) Fraser Lawrence
(United States) Sean MacFarlane
Linesmen:
(United States) Jake Davis
(Sweden) Emil Yletyinen

	0–1	08:17 – Sýkora (Lunter)
	0–2	15:16 – Regenda (Takáč, Ivan)
Anttila (Friman, Pokka) – 18:27	1–2
Anttila – 23:44	2–2
Manninen (Sallinen, Lehtonen) – 44:01	3–2
Mäenalanen (Anttila, Björninen) (EN) – 59:59	4–2

4 min
Penalties
2 min
25
Shots
21

== Semifinals ==
=== Finland vs United States ===
28 May 2022; 14:20	Finland	4–3 (1–1, 2–1, 1–1)	United States	Tampere Deck Arena, Tampere; Attendance: 11,055

Game reference

Juho Olkinuora
Goalies
Jeremy Swayman
Referees:
(Sweden) Mikael Nord
(Sweden) Linus Öhlund
Linesmen:
(Slovakia) Šimon Synek
(Canada) Nathan van Oosten

	0–1	01:04 – Schmidt (Peeke, Tynan)
Heiskanen (Pesonen, Armia) – 16:53	1–1
Manninen (Lehtonen, Hartikainen) (PP) – 24:11	2–1
	2–2	26:52 – Farrell (Meyers, Jones)
Vatanen (Pesonen, Heiskanen) – 29:40	3–2
Armia (Heiskanen, Vatanen) – 45:03	4–2
	4–3	57:09 – Gaudette (Boldy, Tynan) (EA)

2 min
Penalties
6 min
26
Shots
28

=== Canada vs Czechia ===
28 May 2022; 18:20	Canada	6–1 (1–1, 3–0, 2–0)	Czechia	Tampere Deck Arena, Tampere; Attendance: 9,047

Game reference

Chris Driedger
Goalies
Karel Vejmelka
Referees:
(Finland) Lassi Heikkinen
(United States) Jake Rekucki
Linesmen:
(United States) Nick Briganti
(Finland) Hannu Sormunen

	0–1	07:07 – Krejčí (Červenka, Hronek) (PP)
Cozens (Dubois) – 19:27	1–1
Lowry (Johnson, Chabot) (PP) – 27:33	2–1
Johnson (Mercer) – 28:54	3–1
Barzal (Cozens, Batherson) (PP) – 30:52	4–1
Sillinger (Anderson) – 43:56	5–1
Cozens (Batherson, Whitecloud) – 52:50	6–1

8 min
Penalties
8 min
35
Shots
26

== Bronze medal game ==
29 May 2022; 15:20	Czechia	8–4 (1–3, 1–0, 6–1)	United States	Tampere Deck Arena, Tampere; Attendance: 9,737

Game reference

Karel Vejmelka
Marek Langhamer
Goalies
Jeremy Swayman
Referees:
(Finland) Lassi Heikkinen
(Canada) Fraser Lawrence
Linesmen:
(Finland) Hannu Sormunen
(Canada) Nathan van Oosten

	0–1	09:33 – Kuhlman (Meyers, Peeke)
	0–2	12:14 – Gaudette (Boldy, Tynan) (PP)
Černoch (Flek, Stránský) – 15:19	1–2
	1–3	19:47 – Kuhlman (Schmidt, Lafferty) (SH)
Smejkal (Sklenička, Kundrátek) – 32:12	2–3
Pastrňák (Hertl, Zohorna) – 40:51	3–3
Červenka (Krejčí) – 42:29	4–3
Pastrňák (Jordán, Hertl) – 43:37	5–3
Kämpf (Smejkal) (SH) – 54:42	6–3
Kämpf (Šimek) (EN) – 58:08	7–3
	7–4	58:41 – Bordeleau (Watson, Hayden)
Pastrňák (Hertl, Červenka) (PP) – 59:23	8–4

6 min
Penalties
8 min
32
Shots
24

== Gold medal game ==
29 May 2022; 20:20	Finland	4–3 OT (0–0, 0–1, 3–2, 1–0)	Canada	Tampere Deck Arena, Tampere; Attendance: 11,487

Game reference

Juho Olkinuora
Goalies
Chris Driedger
Matt Tomkins
Referees:
(Sweden) Mikael Nord
(Sweden) Linus Öhlund
Linesmen:
(United States) Nick Briganti
(Slovakia) Šimon Synek

	0–1	24:00 – Cozens (Barzal, Severson) (PP)
Granlund (Heiskanen, Lehtonen) (PP2) – 44:13	1–1
Granlund (Lehtonen, Hartikainen) (PP) – 45:57	2–1
Armia (Lammikko) – 54:04	3–1
	3–2	57:48 – Whitecloud (Barzal, Anderson) (EA)
	3–3	58:36 – Comtois (Barzal, Batherson) (EA)
Manninen (Granlund, Heiskanen) (PP) – 66:42	4–3

4 min
Penalties
10 min
31
Shots
22
