= 2022 IIHF World Championship Group B =

Group B was one of two groups of the 2022 IIHF World Championship. The four best placed teams advanced to the playoff round, while the last placed team was relegated to Division I in 2023.

== Standings ==
Pos	Team	Pld	W	OTW	OTL	L	GF	GA	GD	Pts	Qualification or relegation
1	Finland (H)	7	6	0	1	0	25	5	+20	19	Quarterfinals
2	Sweden	7	5	1	1	0	27	10	+17	18	Quarterfinals
3	Czechia	7	4	0	1	2	19	13	+6	13 (Note: United States 0–1 Czechia)	Quarterfinals
4	United States	7	3	2	0	2	18	12	+6	13	Quarterfinals
5	Latvia	7	2	1	0	4	14	20	−6	8	
6	Austria	7	1	1	2	3	16	22	−6	7	
7	Norway	7	1	1	0	5	15	29	−14	5	
8	Great Britain (R)	7	0	0	1	6	10	33	−23	1	Relegation to 2023 Division I A

Source: IIHF
Rules for classification: 1) points; 2) head-to-head points; 3) head-to-head goal difference; 4) head-to-head number of goals scored; 5) result against closest best-ranked team outside tied teams; 6) result against second-best ranked team outside tied teams; 7) seeding before tournament.
(H) Host; (R) Relegated

== Matches ==
All times are local (UTC+3).

=== United States vs Latvia ===
13 May 2022; 16:20	United States	4–1 (3–0, 1–0, 0–1)	Latvia	Tampere Deck Arena, Tampere; Attendance: 7,938

Game reference

Strauss Mann
Goalies
Elvis Merzļikins
Referees:
(Germany) Marian Rohatsch
(Finland) Kristian Vikman
Linesmen:
(Germany) Jonas Merten
(Slovakia) Šimon Synek

Barber (Bellows, Peeke) – 07:11	1–0
Jones (Schmidt, Galchenyuk) (PP) – 10:18	2–0
Bordeleau (Jones) (SH) – 11:36	3–0
Lafferty (Megna) – 20:33	4–0
	4–1	41:47 – Džeriņš (Ri. Bukarts, Čukste) (PP)

8 min
Penalties
8 min
30
Shots
25

=== Finland vs Norway ===
13 May 2022; 20:20	Finland	5–0 (1–0, 2–0, 2–0)	Norway	Tampere Deck Arena, Tampere; Attendance: 11,413

Game reference

Juho Olkinuora
Goalies
Henrik Haukeland
Referees:
(Canada) Fraser Lawrence
(Sweden) Mikael Nord
Linesmen:
(Canada) Maxime Chaput
(France) Nicolas Constantineau

Pesonen (Armia, Filppula) – 18:29	1–0
Rajala – 31:37	2–0
Björninen (Anttila, Pokka) – 36:06	3–0
Armia (Vatanen, Rajala) (PP) – 41:36	4–0
Sallinen (Friman, Rajala) – 57:56	5–0

32 min
Penalties
36 min
32
Shots
20

=== Sweden vs Austria ===
14 May 2022; 12:20	Sweden	3–1 (2–1, 1–0, 0–0)	Austria	Tampere Deck Arena, Tampere; Attendance: 6,993

Game reference

Marcus Högberg
Goalies
Bernhard Starkbaum
Referees:
(Denmark) Mads Frandsen
(Germany) Marian Rohatsch
Linesmen:
(Denmark) Andreas Krøyer
(Switzerland) David Obwegeser

Kellman (Bengtsson, Klingberg) – 02:08	1–0
Friberg (Kellman) – 16:37	2–0
	2–1	19:30 – Schneider (Heinrich)
Nordström (Bromé, Gustafsson) – 32:07	3–1

8 min
Penalties
8 min
29
Shots
20

=== Czechia vs Great Britain ===
14 May 2022; 16:20	Czechia	5–1 (0–0, 2–0, 3–1)	Great Britain	Tampere Deck Arena, Tampere; Attendance: 6,286

Game reference

Lukáš Dostál
Goalies
Ben Bowns
Referees:
(Switzerland) Miroslav Stolc
(Finland) Kristian Vikman
Linesmen:
(France) Nicolas Constantineau
(Germany) Jonas Merten

Blümel (Krejčí, Červenka) – 27:09	1–0
Flek (Ščotka, Jordán) – 32:23	2–0
Jiříček (Červenka, Smejkal) (PP) – 41:11	3–0
Černoch (Smejkal, Blümel) – 46:43	4–0
Blümel (Červenka, Krejčí) – 48:28	5–0
	5–1	50:57 – Lake (Conway)

8 min
Penalties
8 min
34
Shots
18

=== Latvia vs Finland ===
14 May 2022; 20:20	Latvia	1–2 (1–0, 0–1, 0–1)	Finland	Tampere Deck Arena, Tampere; Attendance: 11,483

Game reference

Elvis Merzļikins
Goalies
Harri Säteri
Referees:
(Canada) Jeff Ingram
(United States) Sean MacFarlane
Linesmen:
(United States) Nick Briganti
(Canada) Nathan van Oosten

Balcers (Ķēniņš) – 08:52	1–0
	1–1	30:52 – Manninen (Granlund, Lehtonen) (PP)
	1–2	57:08 – Granlund (Lehtonen, Manninen) (PP)

6 min
Penalties
4 min
18
Shots
16

=== Norway vs Great Britain ===
15 May 2022; 12:20	Norway	4–3 GWS (1–0, 2–0, 0–3) (OT: 0–0) (SO: 1–0)	Great Britain	Tampere Deck Arena, Tampere; Attendance: 4,651

Game reference

Henrik Haukeland
Goalies
Ben Bowns
Referees:
(Denmark) Mads Frandsen
(Canada) Fraser Lawrence
Linesmen:
(Denmark) Andreas Krøyer
(Switzerland) David Obwegeser

Klavestad (Trettenes, Hoff) – 16:13	1–0
M. Olimb (Rosseli Olsen, Johannesen) (PP) – 26:35	2–0
M. Olimb (K. Olimb, Rosseli Olsen) (PP) – 35:19	3–0
	3–1	52:51 – Dowd (Lake, Batch)
	3–2	53:29 – Perlini (Mosey, Conway)
	3–3	56:09 – Richardson (Perlini, Tetlow)

Jakobsson (miss)
Trettenes
Haga
Rosseli Olsen (miss)
Shootout
(miss) Lake
(miss) O'Connor
Conway
(miss) Dowd
(miss) Neilson
4 min
Penalties
10 min
33
Shots
24

=== Austria vs United States ===
15 May 2022; 16:20	Austria	2–3 OT (1–0, 1–1, 0–1) (OT: 0–1)	United States	Tampere Deck Arena, Tampere; Attendance: 4,228

Game reference

David Kickert
Goalies
Strauss Mann
Referees:
(Sweden) Mikael Nord
(Switzerland) Miroslav Stolc
Linesmen:
(Canada) Maxime Chaput
(Canada) Nathan van Oosten

Nissner (Kasper, Maier) – 14:25	1–0
Huber (Wukovits, Haudum) – 34:26	2–0
	2–1	34:43 – Bellows (Meyers, Megna)
	2–2	48:43 – Gaudette (Galchenyuk, Jones) (PP)
	2–3	63:07 – Hughes (Farrell)

8 min
Penalties
6 min
16
Shots
39

=== Czechia vs Sweden ===
15 May 2022; 20:20	Czechia	3–5 (1–1, 1–3, 1–1)	Sweden	Tampere Deck Arena, Tampere; Attendance: 6,089

Game reference

Karel Vejmelka
Marek Langhamer
Goalies
Magnus Hellberg
Referees:
(Canada) Jeff Ingram
(United States) Sean MacFarlane
Linesmen:
(United States) Nick Briganti
(Slovakia) Šimon Synek

Krejčí (Červenka) – 06:03	1–0
	1–1	19:24 – Asplund (Bemström, Wallmark) (PP)
	1–2	22:47 – Bemström (Wallmark, Gustaffson) (PP)
	1–3	25:50 – Bromé
	1–4	28:52 – Asplund (Gustaffson)
Kundrátek (Červenka, Jiříček) (PP) – 37:36	2–4
	2–5	44:50 – Bengtsson (Bromé)
Blümel (Červenka, Šimek) – 45:19	3–5

12 min
Penalties
8 min
21
Shots
34

=== Latvia vs Norway ===
16 May 2022; 16:20	Latvia	3–2 (1–1, 2–0, 0–1)	Norway	Tampere Deck Arena, Tampere; Attendance: 8,510

Game reference

Elvis Merzļikins
Goalies
Henrik Haukeland
Referees:
(Denmark) Mads Frandsen
(Finland) Kristian Vikman
Linesmen:
(France) Nicolas Constantineau
(Denmark) Andreas Krøyer

Ābols (Ķēniņš, Balcers) – 14:04	1–0
	1–1	18:41 – Rosseli Olsen (Rokseth, Hoff)
Jeļisejevs (Balcers, Jaks) (PP) – 27:16	2–1
Ro. Bukarts (Sotnieks, Smons) – 33:00	3–1
	3–2	47:12 – Krogdahl (Nørstebø, K. A. Olimb)

4 min
Penalties
35 min
28
Shots
36

=== Finland vs United States ===
16 May 2022; 20:20	Finland	4–1 (1–0, 3–0, 0–1)	United States	Tampere Deck Arena, Tampere; Attendance: 11,555

Game reference

Juho Olkinuora
Goalies
Strauss Mann
Referees:
(Sweden) Mikael Nord
(Germany) Marian Rohatsch
Linesmen:
(Germany) Jonas Merten
(Canada) Nathan van Oosten

Granlund (Manninen, Lehtonen) (PP) – 17:20	1–0
Filppula (Innala, Vatanen (PP) – 24:42	2–0
Manninen (Sallinen, Granlund) (PP) – 25:36	3–0
Lehtonen (Hartikainen, Manninen) – 30:50	4–0
	4–1	58:22 – Galchenyuk (Hughes, Jones)

14 min
Penalties
41 min
25
Shots
30

=== Czechia vs Austria ===
17 May 2022; 16:20	Czechia	1–2 GWS (1–0, 0–0, 0–1) (OT: 0–0) (SO: 0–1)	Austria	Tampere Deck Arena, Tampere; Attendance: 3,264

Game reference
Karel Vejmelka	Goalies	Bernhard Starkbaum	Referees: (Denmark) Mads Frandsen (Sweden) Mikael Nord; Linesmen: (France) Nicolas Constantineau (Denmark) Andreas Krøyer
Červenka (Blümel, Kundrátek) – 17:59 / 1–0; / 1–1 / 59:22 – Lebler (Heinrich, Schneider) (EA)			Referees: (Denmark) Mads Frandsen (Sweden) Mikael Nord; Linesmen: (France) Nicolas Constantineau (Denmark) Andreas Krøyer
Hertl (miss); Červenka (miss); Blümel (miss); Smejkal (miss); Krejčí (miss)	Shootout	(miss) Kasper; (miss) Ganahl; Schneider; (miss) Heinrich	Referees: (Denmark) Mads Frandsen (Sweden) Mikael Nord; Linesmen: (France) Nicolas Constantineau (Denmark) Andreas Krøyer
4 min	Penalties	4 min	Referees: (Denmark) Mads Frandsen (Sweden) Mikael Nord; Linesmen: (France) Nicolas Constantineau (Denmark) Andreas Krøyer
25	Shots	19	Referees: (Denmark) Mads Frandsen (Sweden) Mikael Nord; Linesmen: (France) Nicolas Constantineau (Denmark) Andreas Krøyer

=== Sweden vs Great Britain ===
17 May 2022; 20:20	Sweden	6–0 (5–0, 0–0, 1–0)	Great Britain	Tampere Deck Arena, Tampere; Attendance: 3,012

Game reference

Magnus Hellberg
Goalies
Ben Bowns
Jackson Whistle
Referees:
(Canada) Fraser Lawrence
(Germany) Marian Rohatsch
Linesmen:
(Germany) Jonas Merten
(Slovakia) Šimon Synek

Asplund (Kellman, Dahlin) – 00:13	1–0
Nordström (Larsson, Bemström) – 07:43	2–0
Bengtsson (Bromé) – 10:24	3–0
Dahlin (Pudas, Bengtsson) – 13:09	4–0
Asplund (Kellman, Dahlin) (PP) – 19:55	5–0
Bengtsson (Lang, Tömmernes) – 53:09	6–0

4 min
Penalties
10 min
38
Shots
16

=== Norway vs Austria ===
18 May 2022; 16:20	Norway	5–3 (1–1, 2–1, 2–1)	Austria	Tampere Deck Arena, Tampere; Attendance: 6,137

Game reference

Henrik Haukeland
Goalies
David Kickert
Referees:
(Canada) Fraser Lawrence
(Switzerland) Miroslav Stolc
Linesmen:
(Canada) Maxime Chaput
(Switzerland) David Obwegeser

	0–1	06:48 – Heinrich (Wukovits, Schneider) (PP)
Rosseli Olsen (K. Olimb) (SH) – 07:33	1–1
Martinsen (Johannesen, Rosseli Olsen) – 20:55	2–1
	2–2	26:54 – Haudum (Unterweger, Ganahl) (PP)
Røymark (Haga, Nørstebø) (EA) – 31:44	3–2
Rosseli Olsen (Martinsen, K. Olimb) (PP2) – 47:32	4–2
	4–3	56:12 – Schneider (Wukovits, Heinrich) (PP)
Rønnild (Jakobsson) (EN) – 59:47	5–3

14 min
Penalties
33 min
26
Shots
27

=== Finland vs Sweden ===
18 May 2022; 20:20	Finland	2–3 GWS (0–1, 2–0, 0–1) (OT: 0–0) (SO: 0–1)	Sweden	Tampere Deck Arena, Tampere; Attendance: 11,695

Game reference

Harri Säteri
Goalies
Magnus Hellberg
Referees:
(Canada) Jeff Ingram
(United States) Sean MacFarlane
Linesmen:
(United States) Nick Briganti
(Canada) Nathan van Oosten

	0–1	11:38 – Larsson (Peterson, Dahlin)
Lehtonen (Björninen, Anttila) – 23:38	1–1
Vatanen (Lehtonen, Armia) – 25:39	2–1
	2–2	46:38 – Kellman (Gustafsson, Ekman-Larsson)

Manninen (miss)
Vatanen (miss)
Björninen (miss)
Granlund (miss)
Rajala (miss)
Shootout
(miss) Ekman-Larsson
Bemström
(miss) Tömmernes
(miss) Asplund
(miss) Kellman
4 min
Penalties
6 min
31
Shots
25

=== Great Britain vs United States ===
19 May 2022; 16:20	Great Britain	0–3 (0–0, 0–1, 0–2)	United States	Tampere Deck Arena, Tampere; Attendance: 4,506

Game reference

Jackson Whistle
Goalies
Jeremy Swayman
Referees:
(Canada) Jeff Ingram
(Switzerland) Miroslav Stolc
Linesmen:
(Germany) Jonas Merten
(Slovakia) Šimon Synek

0–1	28:20 – Meyers (Peeke, Schmidt)
0–2	40:58 – Bellows (Gaudette, Farrell) (PP)
0–3	43:41 – Bellows (Farrell, Schmidt) (PP)

10 min
Penalties
12 min
17
Shots
38

=== Czechia vs Latvia ===
19 May 2022; 20:20	Czechia	5–1 (5–0, 0–0, 0–1)	Latvia	Tampere Deck Arena, Tampere; Attendance: 5,711

Game reference

Karel Vejmelka
Goalies
Elvis Merzļikins
Artūrs Šilovs
Referees:
(Canada) Fraser Lawrence
(United States) Sean MacFarlane
Linesmen:
(Denmark) Andreas Krøyer
(Switzerland) David Obwegeser

Zohorna (Hertl, Blümel) – 04:02	1–0
Červenka (Pastrňák, Krejčí) (PP) – 04:58	2–0
Špaček (Flek) – 06:41	3–0
Hertl (Zohorna, Blümel) – 16:30	4–0
Pastrňák (Krejčí, Červenka) – 18:56	5–0
	5–1	41:01 – Kulda (Ri. Bukarts, Džeriņš)

6 min
Penalties
6 min
28
Shots
17

=== Great Britain vs Finland ===
20 May 2022; 16:20	Great Britain	0–6 (0–2, 0–2, 0–2)	Finland	Tampere Deck Arena, Tampere; Attendance: 11,502

Game reference

Ben Bowns
Goalies
Juho Olkinuora
Referees:
(France) Pierre Dehaen
(Denmark) Mads Frandsen
Linesmen:
(United States) Nick Briganti
(Austria) Elias Seewald

0–1	06:48 – Friman (Vatanen, Lammikko)
0–2	11:38 – Hietanen (Manninen, Lehtonen)
0–3	26:40 – Filppula (Granlund, Hartikainen)
0–4	28:27 – Armia (Friman, Pesonen)
0–5	49:01 – Mäenalanen (Lindell, Ohtamaa)
0–6	55:42 – Rajala (Heiskanen, Pesonen) (PP)

4 min
Penalties
2 min
10
Shots
42

=== Latvia vs Austria ===
20 May 2022; 20:20	Latvia	4–3 GWS (0–0, 3–2, 0–1) (OT: 0–0) (SO: 1–0)	Austria	Tampere Deck Arena, Tampere; Attendance: 8,516

Game reference

Artūrs Šilovs
Goalies
Bernhard Starkbaum
Referees:
(Sweden) Mikael Nord
(Switzerland) Miroslav Stolc
Linesmen:
(Canada) Maxime Chaput
(Slovakia) Šimon Synek

	0–1	21:10 – Nissner (Raffl, Schneider)
Balcers (Jaks, Ābols) – 25:36	1–1
Ri. Bukarts (Čukste, Džeriņš) (PP) – 29:50	2–1
	2–2	31:24 – Heinrich (Schneider, Haudum) (PP2)
Balcers (Ri. Bukarts, Sotnieks) – 35:40	3–2
	3–3	46:21 – Raffl (Zündel, Nissner)

Jeļisejevs
Ābols (miss)
Ro. Bukarts
Balcers (miss)
Shootout
(miss) Kasper
(miss) Ganahl
(miss) Schneider
Heinrich
(miss) Lebler
10 min
Penalties
10 min
21
Shots
32

=== United States vs Sweden ===
21 May 2022; 12:20	United States	3–2 OT (1–1, 1–0, 0–1) (OT: 1–0)	Sweden	Tampere Deck Arena, Tampere; Attendance: 8,304

Game reference

Jeremy Swayman
Goalies
Linus Ullmark
Referees:
(Canada) Fraser Lawrence
(Slovakia) Peter Stano
Linesmen:
(Switzerland) David Obwegeser
(Canada) Nathan van Oosten

	0–1	02:28 - Dahlin (Lang, Åman)
Gaudette (Meyers, Peeke) – 07:50	1–1
Schmidt (Gaudette, Tynan) (PP) – 38:58	2–1
	2–2	46:56 – Grundström
Gaudette (Tynan, Swayman) – 64:48	3–2

6 min
Penalties
6 min
24
Shots
22

=== Austria vs Finland ===
21 May 2022; 16:20	Austria	0–3 (0–1, 0–1, 0–1)	Finland	Tampere Deck Arena, Tampere; Attendance: 11,573

Game reference

David Kickert
Goalies
Juho Olkinuora
Referees:
(Canada) Jeff Ingram
(Sweden) Mikael Nord
Linesmen:
(United States) Nick Briganti
(Canada) Maxime Chaput

0–1	01:45 – Filppula (Hartikainen, Granlund)
0–2	24:10 – Granlund (Hartikainen, Lehtonen)
0–3	47:39 – Rajala (Filppula)

6 min
Penalties
2 min
19
Shots
39

=== Norway vs Czechia ===
21 May 2022; 20:20	Norway	1–4 (0–1, 0–1, 1–2)	Czechia	Tampere Deck Arena, Tampere; Attendance: 6,015

Game reference

Jonas Arntzen
Goalies
Karel Vejmelka
Referees:
(Denmark) Mads Frandsen
(United States) Sean MacFarlane
Linesmen:
(Finland) Tommi Niittylä
(Sweden) Emil Yletyinen

	0–1	06:26 – Pastrňák (Krejčí, Červenka) (PP)
	0–2	22:21 – Vrána (Černoch, Kundrátek) (PP)
	0–3	40:48 – Pastrňák (PS)
Hoff (Trettenes, Haga) (PP) – 44:27	1–3
	1–4	58:34 – Červenka (Pastrňák, Krejčí) (EN)

12 min
Penalties
10 min
22
Shots
32

=== Great Britain vs Latvia ===
22 May 2022; 16:20	Great Britain	3–4 (2–0, 1–2, 0–2)	Latvia	Tampere Deck Arena, Tampere; Attendance: 4,860

Game reference

Ben Bowns
Goalies
Elvis Merzļikins
Artūrs Šilovs
Referees:
(France) Pierre Dehaen
(United States) Sean MacFarlane
Linesmen:
(Austria) Elias Seewald
(Slovakia) Šimon Synek

Perlini (Myers, Neilson) (PP) – 05:24	1–0
Neilson (Hook, Jones) (EA) – 12:16	2–0
	2–1	24:17 – Batņa (Jeļisejevs, Čukste)
Hook (O'Connor, Batch) – 26:24	3–1
	3–2	34:34 – Jaks (Ro. Bukarts, Dzierkals) (PP)
	3–3	51:49 – Ri. Bukarts (Dzierkals, Ro. Bukarts) (PP)
	3–4	53:11 – Džeriņš (Dzierkals, Čukste) (PP)

14 min
Penalties
10 min
19
Shots
36

=== Sweden vs Norway ===
22 May 2022; 20:20	Sweden	7–1 (1–0, 4–0, 2–1)	Norway	Tampere Deck Arena, Tampere; Attendance: 3,707

Game reference

Magnus Hellberg
Goalies
Jonas Arntzen
Referees:
(Latvia) Andris Ansons
(Czech Republic) Robin Šír
Linesmen:
(United States) Nick Briganti
(Switzerland) David Obwegeser

Peterson (Gustafsson, Nylander) (PP) – 11:48	1–0
Nylander (Gustafsson, Peterson) (PP) – 27:43	2–0
Peterson (Grundström, Tömmernes) – 28:47	3–0
Asplund (Kellman) – 31:38	4–0
Wallmark (Dahlin, Bemström) (PP) – 37:33	5–0
	5–1	40:44 – Fladeby (Johannesen, K. Olimb)
Friberg (Lang, Åman) – 43:13	6–1
Asplund (Nylander, Bemström) (PP) – 49:57	7–1

8 min
Penalties
10 min
35
Shots
20

=== United States vs Czechia ===
23 May 2022; 16:20	United States	0–1 (0–1, 0–0, 0–0)	Czechia	Tampere Deck Arena, Tampere; Attendance: 5,270

Game reference
Jeremy Swayman	Goalies	Karel Vejmelka	Referees: (Finland) Lassi Heikkinen (Canada) Jeff Ingram; Linesmen: (Canada) Maxime Chaput (Canada) Nathan van Oosten
0–1 / 07:53 – Blümel (Zohorna)			Referees: (Finland) Lassi Heikkinen (Canada) Jeff Ingram; Linesmen: (Canada) Maxime Chaput (Canada) Nathan van Oosten
7 min	Penalties	6 min	Referees: (Finland) Lassi Heikkinen (Canada) Jeff Ingram; Linesmen: (Canada) Maxime Chaput (Canada) Nathan van Oosten
24	Shots	16	Referees: (Finland) Lassi Heikkinen (Canada) Jeff Ingram; Linesmen: (Canada) Maxime Chaput (Canada) Nathan van Oosten

=== Austria vs Great Britain ===
23 May 2022; 20:20	Austria	5–3 (0–1, 0–1, 5–1)	Great Britain	Tampere Deck Arena, Tampere; Attendance: 3,321

Game reference

Bernhard Starkbaum
Goalies
Ben Bowns
Referees:
(Denmark) Mads Frandsen
(Sweden) Mikael Nord
Linesmen:
(Germany) Jonas Merten
(Switzerland) David Obwegeser

	0–1	19:00 – Myers (Perlini, Neilson) (PP)
	0–2	21:57 – Dowd (Neilson)
Wukovits (Schneider, Raffl) (PP) – 44:51	1–2
	1–3	46:19 – Neilson
Heinrich (Haudum, Kasper) – 47:28	2–3
Nissner (Raffl) – 51:26	3–3
Raffl (Schneider, Nissner) – 58:54	4–3
Schneider (Heinrich, Nissner) (ENG) – 59:16	5–3

6 min
Penalties
2 min
29
Shots
28

=== Sweden vs Latvia ===
24 May 2022; 12:20	Sweden	1–0 (0–0, 1–0, 0–0)	Latvia	Tampere Deck Arena, Tampere; Attendance: 5,560

Game reference
Linus Ullmark	Goalies	Artūrs Šilovs	Referees: (Denmark) Mads Frandsen (Norway) Roy Stian Hansen; Linesmen: (Denmark) Andreas Krøyer (Germany) Jonas Merten
Nylander (Dahlin, Wallmark) (PP) – 34:54 / 1–0			Referees: (Denmark) Mads Frandsen (Norway) Roy Stian Hansen; Linesmen: (Denmark) Andreas Krøyer (Germany) Jonas Merten
6 min	Penalties	4 min	Referees: (Denmark) Mads Frandsen (Norway) Roy Stian Hansen; Linesmen: (Denmark) Andreas Krøyer (Germany) Jonas Merten
35	Shots	21	Referees: (Denmark) Mads Frandsen (Norway) Roy Stian Hansen; Linesmen: (Denmark) Andreas Krøyer (Germany) Jonas Merten

=== United States vs Norway ===
24 May 2022; 16:20	United States	4–2 (2–0, 1–1, 1–1)	Norway	Tampere Deck Arena, Tampere; Attendance: 5,435

Game reference

Jeremy Swayman
Strauss Mann
Goalies
Henrik Haukeland
Referees:
(Canada) Jeff Ingram
(Canada) Fraser Lawrence
Linesmen:
(Canada) Maxime Chaput
(Slovakia) Šimon Synek

Hartman (Galchenyuk, Lafferty) – 03:45	1–0
Boldy (Galchenyuk) – 07:20	2–0
	2–1	22:43 – Martinsen (Haga, Røymark)
Meyers (Hughes, Kuhlman) – 28:05	3–1
	3–2	41:59 – Rokseth (Jakobsson, Trettenes)
Farrell (EN) – 59:20	4–2

4 min
Penalties
4 min
37
Shots
23

=== Finland vs Czechia ===
24 May 2022; 20:20	Finland	3–0 (2–0, 1–0, 0–0)	Czechia	Tampere Deck Arena, Tampere; Attendance: 11,673

Game reference

Juho Olkinuora
Goalies
Marek Langhamer
Referees:
(Sweden) Mikael Nord
(Switzerland) Miroslav Stolc
Linesmen:
(United States) Nick Briganti
(United States) Jake Davis

Armia (Pesonen) – 09:31	1–0
Manninen (Sallinen, Granlund) (PP) – 16:17	2–0
Rajala (Seppälä, Heiskanen) – 35:34	3–0

4 min
Penalties
6 min
19
Shots
24
