= 2022 IIHF World Championship final =

Ice hockey match

	1	2	3	OT	Total
Finland	0	0	3	1	4
Canada	0	1	2	0	3
- Date: 29 May 2022
- Arena: Tampere Deck Arena
- City: Tampere
- Attendance: 11,487

The 2022 IIHF World Championship final decided the winner of the 2022 IIHF World Championship. It was played at the Tampere Deck Arena in Tampere, Finland on 29 May 2022.

Finland and Canada faced each other for the third consecutive time in the finals, and sixth overall. Finland won in 2019, while Canada prevailed in 2021 (the 2020 IIHF World Championship was cancelled due to the COVID-19 pandemic). Finland took the gold with a 4–3 overtime win, and became the second team to win Olympic gold and World Championship gold in the same year, following Sweden in 2006.

== Road to the final ==
Finland
Round
Canada
Opponent
Result
Preliminary round
Opponent
Result
Norway
5–0
Game 1
Germany
5–3
Latvia
2–1
Game 2
Italy
6–1
United States
4–1
Game 3
Slovakia
5–1
Sweden
2–3 (GWS)
Game 4
Kazakhstan
6–3
Great Britain
6–0
Game 5
Switzerland
3–6
Austria
3–0
Game 6
Denmark
2–3
Czechia
3–0
Game 7
France
7–1

Pos	Team	Pld	Pts
1	Finland (H)	7	19
2	Sweden	7	18
3	Czechia	7	13
4	United States	7	13
5	Latvia	7	8
6	Austria	7	7
7	Norway	7	5
8	Great Britain (R)	7	1

Source: IIHF
(H) Host; (R) Relegated
Preliminary

Pos	Team	Pld	Pts
1	Switzerland	7	20
2	Germany	7	16
3	Canada	7	15
4	Slovakia	7	12
5	Denmark	7	12
6	France	7	5
7	Kazakhstan	7	3
8	Italy (R)	7	1

Source: IIHF
(R) Relegated
Opponent
Result
Playoff
Opponent
Result
Slovakia
4–2
Quarterfinals
Sweden
4–3 (OT)
United States
4–3
Semifinals
Czechia
6–1

== Match ==
29 May 2022; 20:20	Finland	4–3 OT (0–0, 0–1, 3–2, 1–0)	Canada	Tampere Deck Arena, Tampere; Attendance: 11,487

Game reference

Juho Olkinuora
Goalies
Chris Driedger
Matt Tomkins
Referees:
(Sweden) Mikael Nord
(Sweden) Linus Öhlund
Linesmen:
(United States) Nick Briganti
(Slovakia) Šimon Synek

	0–1	24:00 – Cozens (Barzal, Severson) (PP)
Granlund (Heiskanen, Lehtonen) (PP2) – 44:13	1–1
Granlund (Lehtonen, Hartikainen) (PP) – 45:57	2–1
Armia (Lammikko) – 54:04	3–1
	3–2	57:48 – Whitecloud (Barzal, Anderson) (EA)
	3–3	58:36 – Comtois (Barzal, Batherson) (EA)
Manninen (Granlund, Heiskanen) (PP) – 66:42	4–3

4 min
Penalties
10 min
31
Shots
22
