= Pierre-Luc Dubois =

Canadian ice hockey player (born 1998)

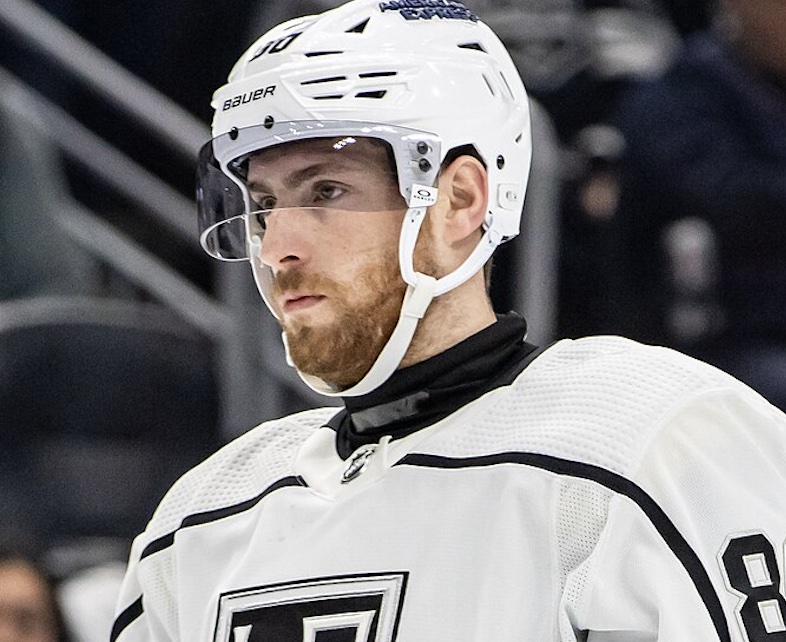
- Dubois with the Los Angeles Kings in 2023
- Born: June 24, 1998 (age 28) Sainte-Agathe-des-Monts, Quebec, Canada
- Height: 6 ft 4 in (193 cm)
- Weight: 220 lb (100 kg; 15 st 10 lb)
- Position: Centre
- Shoots: Left
- NHL team Former teams: Washington Capitals; Columbus Blue Jackets; Winnipeg Jets; Los Angeles Kings
- National team: Canada
- NHL draft: 3rd overall, 2016; Columbus Blue Jackets
- Playing career: 2017–present

Pierre-Luc Dubois (born June 24, 1998) is a Canadian professional ice hockey player who is a centre for the Washington Capitals of the National Hockey League (NHL). Dubois was born in Sainte-Agathe-des-Monts, Quebec, but grew up in Rimouski. He was drafted third overall in the 2016 NHL entry draft by the Columbus Blue Jackets, and has also played for the Winnipeg Jets and Los Angeles Kings.

== Playing career ==
=== Youth ===
Dubois played in the 2010 and 2011 Quebec International Pee-Wee Hockey Tournaments with the Rimouski Océanic minor ice hockey team.

=== Junior ===
Dubois was drafted by the Quebec Major Junior Hockey League (QMJHL)'s Cape Breton Screaming Eagles in the first round, fifth overall, of the 2014 QMJHL Entry Draft, and began with the Screaming Eagles in the 2014–15 season. In his rookie season, Dubois was the league's top-scoring 16-year-old.

Leading up to 2016 NHL entry draft, Dubois was the top-ranked North American skater. He was described as a multi-dimensional player.

On December 11, 2016, Dubois was traded to the Blainville-Boisbriand Armada.

=== Professional ===
==== Columbus Blue Jackets ====
On June 24, 2016, his 18th birthday, Dubois was drafted by the Columbus Blue Jackets third overall at the 2016 NHL Entry Draft. On June 29, he signed a three-year, entry-level contract with Columbus. He was invited to the Blue Jackets' development camp but was sent back to the Eagles for the 2016–17 season, after which he was traded to the Blainville-Boisbriand Armada.

Dubois began the 2017–18 season in the NHL, playing centre to wingers Artemi Panarin and Josh Anderson. He scored his first career NHL goal on October 6, 2017, against the New York Islanders in a 5–0 win. He scored his first career NHL hat-trick on March 29, 2018, against the Calgary Flames. With his hat-trick, Dubois broke the Blue Jackets rookie scoring record that was previously held by Rick Nash.

On August 6, 2020, Dubois recorded the first playoff hat-trick in Blue Jackets franchise history in a 4–3 overtime victory against the Toronto Maple Leafs.

On December 31, 2020, Dubois signed a two-year, $10 million contract with the Blue Jackets. However, two weeks after signing the contract, he requested a trade from the team. While Blue Jackets' general manager Jarmo Kekäläinen initially stated he was in no rush to trade Dubois, the situation between Dubois and Columbus became increasingly untenable. This culminated in Dubois being benched after the first period during a 3–2 overtime loss to the Tampa Bay Lightning on January 21, 2021, following Dubois' lackadaisical play early in the game.

==== Winnipeg Jets ====
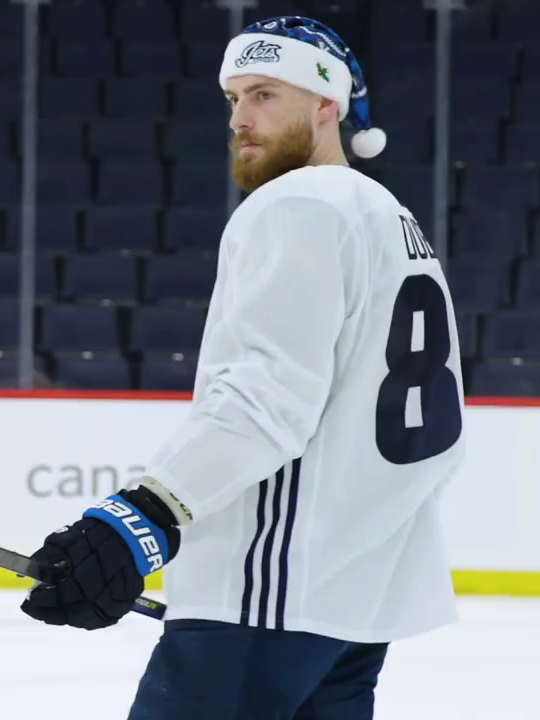
Dubois warming up with the Winnipeg Jets in December 2021.

On January 23, 2021, Dubois was traded with a 2022 third-round pick to the Winnipeg Jets in exchange for Patrik Laine and Jack Roslovic. The 2020–21 season was played in a specialized format due to the COVID-19 pandemic, with the Jets part of the all-Canadian North Division, and Dubois had to quarantine for two weeks upon arrival, limiting his training and preparation time. He sustained an injury in only his second game with the team, missing four games as a result. On February 21, in just his third game with the Jets, Dubois scored his first two goals as a Winnipeg Jet in a 4–3 overtime win against the Vancouver Canucks. Dubois' second goal of the game was the overtime winner. Dubois also scored an assist in the same game, coincidentally doing the same thing that Laine did in his last game as a Winnipeg Jet (scoring 2 goals and 1 assist, with one of the two goals coming in overtime). The season ultimately proved disappointing for both Dubois and the Jets. The team qualified for the 2021 Stanley Cup playoffs, but after sweeping the Edmonton Oilers in the first round they were swept in turn by the Montreal Canadiens in the second. Another injury prematurely concluded Dubois' regular season, and delayed his playoff debut against the Oilers. He managed only eight goals and twelve assists in 41 games in the regular season, ending a 24-game goalless streak. He fared little better in the postseason, with only three assists in seven games. Dubois said afterward "I know I can be a lot better. This year was my fourth year in the NHL. I'm really happy with my first three."

The 2021–22 season was a further disappointment for the Jets, ultimately missing the playoffs. Dubois, however, saw major improvement compared to his first season, scoring 28 goals and registering 32 assists, a new high in goals and nearly equaling his best seasonal points total. The Winnipeg Sun remarked that he "embodies everything the Jets want in their lineup and their leadership core," and looked like a possible successor to top centre Mark Scheifele, making the end of his current contract a major issue for the team. However, it was reported near the end of June that Dubois had informed the Jets that he did not intend to sign a new long-term deal, and would test free agency in 2024. Reports began to circulate that Dubois instead had an interest in playing for the Montreal Canadiens, the NHL's storied Quebec franchise, with his agent Pat Brisson confirming to TVA Sports that Montreal was "a place, a city he’d like to play in. That’s all I can say about that." On July 15, The Athletic reported that Dubois was attempting to force a trade to the Canadiens, and had attended the 2022 NHL entry draft in Montreal in person because he believed a trade would be consummated on the draft floor. However, it was said that Winnipeg general manager Kevin Cheveldayoff had demanded in exchange a player that Canadiens general manager Kent Hughes was unwilling to trade, and instead the Canadiens acquired Kirby Dach from the Chicago Blackhawks at the draft. This report encouraged further speculation as to Dubois' future with the team, amplified further by his decision on July 22 to accept a one-year, $6 million qualifying offer from the team.

==== Los Angeles Kings ====
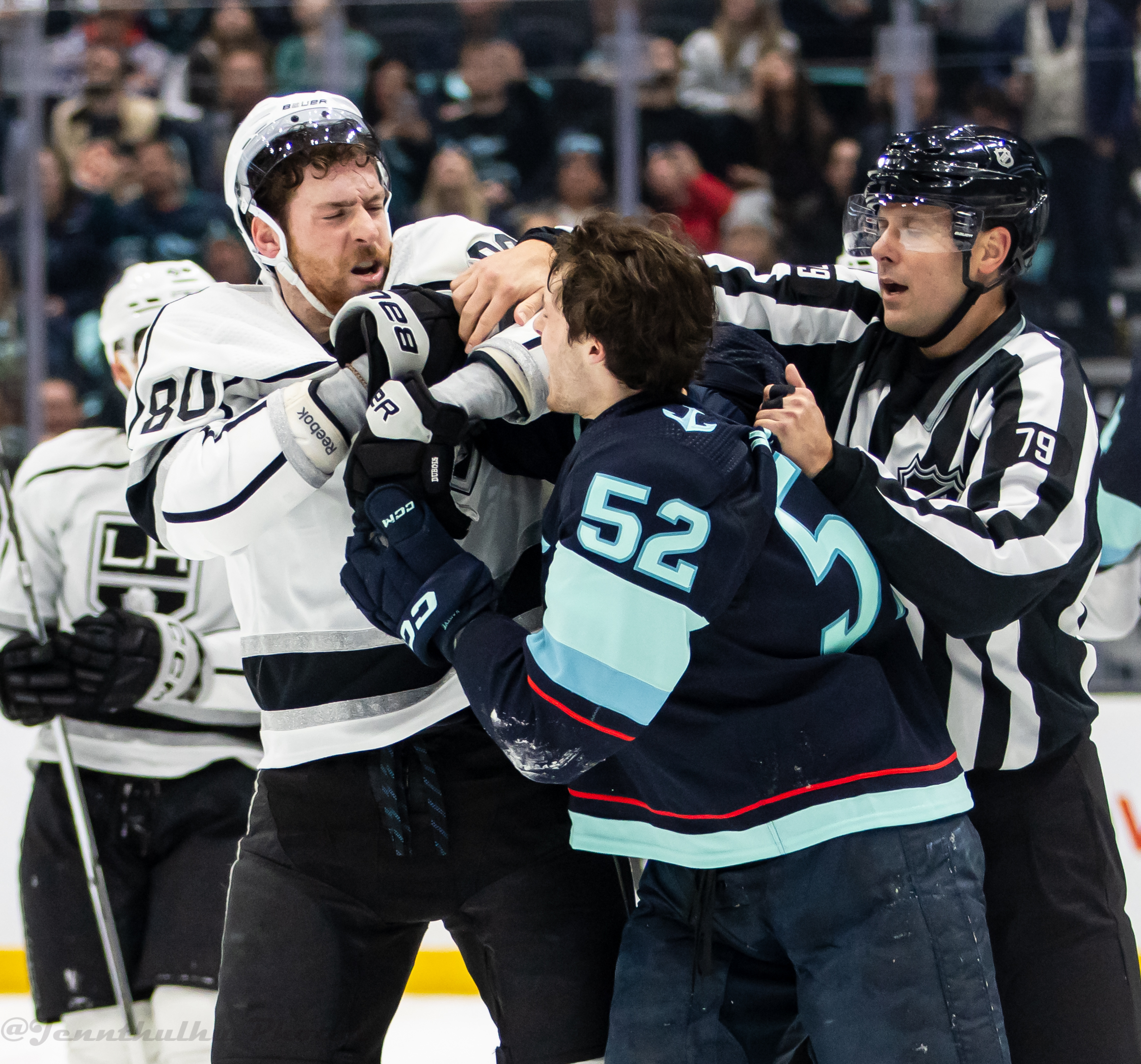
Dubois fighting Tye Kartye of the Seattle Kraken in December 2023.

On June 27, 2023, Dubois was traded by the Jets to the Los Angeles Kings in exchange for Alex Iafallo, Rasmus Kupari, Gabriel Vilardi, and a 2024 second-round draft pick. Upon being traded, Dubois signed an eight-year, $68 million contract.

==== Washington Capitals ====
After only one season of his eight-year contract with Los Angeles, Dubois was traded to the Washington Capitals on June 19, 2024, in exchange for Darcy Kuemper.

== International play ==
Medal record

Ice hockey

Representing Canada

World Championships
Silver medal – second place	2019 Slovakia	
Silver medal – second place	2022 Finland	

World Junior Championships
Silver medal – second place	2017 Canada	

World U18 Championships
Bronze medal – third place	2015 Switzerland	

Ivan Hlinka Memorial
Gold medal – first place	2015 Slovakia/Czech Republic	

On December 1, 2015, Dubois was announced as 1 of 30 players invited to the Canadian selection camp for the 2016 World Junior Hockey Championships; he was one of only two 17-year-olds invited.

On April 27, 2018, Dubois was named to the senior Team Canada for the 2018 IIHF World Championship. He managed three goals and four assists in nine games, but Team Canada ultimately finished in fourth place, losing the bronze medal game to Team USA.

On May 10, 2019, Dubois was a late inclusion to Canada's roster at the 2019 IIHF World Championship, joining the squad following the Blue Jackets' second-round defeat in the 2019 Stanley Cup playoffs. Dubois helped Canada progress through to the playoff rounds before losing the final to Team Finland on May 26, earning the silver medal. He finished the tournament with three goals and seven points through eight games. Three years later, with the Jets failing to make the playoffs, Dubois joined Team Canada again for the 2022 IIHF World Championship, and immediately distinguished himself as one of the team's best players. Team Canada again reached the championship final, but ended with a 4–3 loss to Team Finland. Dubois earned his second World silver, and had seven goals and six assists in the tournament.

Following the Los Angeles Kings' ouster in the first round of the 2024 Stanley Cup playoffs, Dubois again joined Team Canada for the 2024 IIHF World Championship.

== Personal life ==
Dubois is a dual citizen of Canada and the United States; his mother Jill is originally from Atlanta, Georgia. His father, Éric Dubois, is a former professional ice hockey player and is currently defensive coach of the Winnipeg Jets' American Hockey League (AHL) affiliate, the Manitoba Moose, which are also based in Winnipeg. Dubois began playing hockey when he was three years old in Germany, where his father played in the Deutsche Eishockey Liga (DEL). He has an older sister, Daphne.

== Career statistics ==
=== Regular season and playoffs ===
			Regular season					Playoffs
Season	Team	League	GP	G	A	Pts	PIM	GP	G	A	Pts	PIM
2013–14	Collège Notre-Dame Albatros	QMAAA	40	17	21	38	92	3	0	0	0	6
2014–15	Cape Breton Screaming Eagles	QMJHL	54	10	35	45	58	7	2	3	5	6
2015–16	Cape Breton Screaming Eagles	QMJHL	62	42	57	99	112	12	7	5	12	14
2016–17	Cape Breton Screaming Eagles	QMJHL	20	6	12	18	33	—	—	—	—	—
2016–17	Blainville-Boisbriand Armada	QMJHL	28	15	22	37	45	19	9	13	22	26
2017–18	Columbus Blue Jackets	NHL	82	20	28	48	49	6	2	2	4	6
2018–19	Columbus Blue Jackets	NHL	82	27	34	61	64	10	2	3	5	14
2019–20	Columbus Blue Jackets	NHL	70	18	31	49	49	10	4	6	10	4
2020–21	Columbus Blue Jackets	NHL	5	1	0	1	2	—	—	—	—	—
2020–21	Winnipeg Jets	NHL	41	8	12	20	36	7	0	3	3	8
2021–22	Winnipeg Jets	NHL	81	28	32	60	106	—	—	—	—	—
2022–23	Winnipeg Jets	NHL	73	27	36	63	77	5	2	2	4	8
2023–24	Los Angeles Kings	NHL	82	16	24	40	70	5	1	0	1	20
2024–25	Washington Capitals	NHL	82	20	46	66	76	10	0	3	3	12
2025–26	Washington Capitals	NHL	29	5	14	19	19	—	—	—	—	—
NHL totals			627	170	257	427	548	53	11	19	30	72

=== International ===
Year	Team	Event	Result	GP	G	A	Pts	PIM
2014	Canada Black	U17	7th	5	2	1	3	2
2015	Canada	U18	3rd place, bronze medalist(s)	6	0	1	1	4
2015	Canada	IH18	1st place, gold medalist(s)	4	0	3	3	0
2017	Canada	WJC	2nd place, silver medalist(s)	7	0	5	5	6
2018	Canada	WC	4th	9	3	4	7	2
2019	Canada	WC	2nd place, silver medalist(s)	8	3	4	7	6
2022	Canada	WC	2nd place, silver medalist(s)	10	7	6	13	12
2024	Canada	WC	4th	10	4	5	9	6
Junior totals				22	2	10	12	12
Senior totals				37	17	19	36	26

== Awards and honours ==
Award	Year
CHL / QMJHL
CHL/NHL Top Prospects Game	2016
Second All-Star Team	2016
Paul Dumont Trophy	2016
Mike Bossy Trophy	2016
International
World Championship All-Star Team	2022

Awards and achievements
Preceded by Gabriel Carlsson	Columbus Blue Jackets first-round draft pick 2016	Succeeded by Liam Foudy
