= Marco Kasper =

Austrian ice hockey player (born 2004)

- Born: 8 April 2004 (age 22) Innsbruck, Austria
- Height: 6 ft 1 in (185 cm)
- Weight: 202 lb (92 kg; 14 st 6 lb)
- Position: Centre
- Shoots: Left
- NHL team Former teams: Detroit Red Wings; Rögle BK
- National team: Austria
- NHL draft: 8th overall, 2022; Detroit Red Wings
- Playing career: 2021–present

Marco Kasper (German pronunciation: [ˈmarkoː ˈkaspɐ]; born 8 April 2004) is an Austrian ice hockey player who is a centre for the Detroit Red Wings of the National Hockey League (NHL). He was selected eighth overall by the Red Wings in the 2022 NHL entry draft.

== Playing career ==
Kasper played his first professional game with Rögle BK on 21 January 2021, logging 11 minutes and 35 seconds of ice time. He was the second player born in 2004 to appear in a Swedish Hockey League (SHL) game.

The Detroit Red Wings selected Kasper with the eighth overall pick in the 2022 NHL entry draft. Just days later, on 13 July 2022, the Red Wings officially signed Kasper to a standard three-year, entry-level contract.

Kasper made his NHL debut on 2 April 2023, contributing to a 5–2 win against the Toronto Maple Leafs. He earned his first NHL point on 19 October 2024, with an assist on a Vladimir Tarasenko goal during a 5–2 victory over the Nashville Predators. Kasper then scored his first NHL goal on 15 November, beating Anaheim Ducks goaltender John Gibson in a 6–4 loss. Kasper was named the 2025 Red Wings Rookie of the Year by the Detroit Sports Media organization.

== International play ==
Kasper played for Austria at the 2021 World Junior Championships, tallying one assist over four games. He also took part in the 2022 World Junior Championships.

== Personal life ==
Kasper's father, Peter, was a professional ice hockey player who competed for several teams in Austria and represented the country at the 2002 Winter Olympics. Kasper also appeared in the Austrian film Harrinator, portraying a young hockey player named Robert Begusch.

== Career statistics ==
=== Regular season and playoffs ===
			Regular season					Playoffs
Season	Team	League	GP	G	A	Pts	PIM	GP	G	A	Pts	PIM
2019–20	EC KAC II	AlpsHL	3	1	1	2	0	—	—	—	—	—
2020–21	Rögle BK	J20	6	2	0	2	6	—	—	—	—	—
2020–21	Rögle BK	SHL	10	0	1	1	4	6	0	0	0	0
2021–22	Rögle BK	J20	12	6	7	13	10	1	1	2	3	0
2021–22	Rögle BK	SHL	46	7	4	11	17	13	3	3	6	9
2022–23	Rögle BK	SHL	52	8	15	23	72	9	0	3	3	6
2022–23	Detroit Red Wings	NHL	1	0	0	0	0	—	—	—	—	—
2023–24	Grand Rapids Griffins	AHL	71	14	21	35	30	9	4	3	7	14
2024–25	Grand Rapids Griffins	AHL	2	1	1	2	7	—	—	—	—	—
2024–25	Detroit Red Wings	NHL	77	19	18	37	34	—	—	—	—	—
2025–26	Detroit Red Wings	NHL	81	9	10	19	33	—	—	—	—	—
SHL totals			108	15	20	35	93	28	3	6	9	15
NHL totals			159	28	28	56	67	—	—	—	—	—

=== International ===
Year	Team	Event	Result	GP	G	A	Pts	PIM
2021	Austria	WJC	10th	4	0	1	1	2
2022	Austria	WC	11th	7	0	2	2	0
2025	Austria	WC	8th	8	4	3	7	4
Junior totals				4	0	1	1	2
Senior totals				15	4	5	9	4

Awards and achievements
Preceded by Sebastian Cossa	Detroit Red Wings first-round draft pick 2022	Succeeded by Nate Danielson
