= Josh Batch =

English ice hockey player

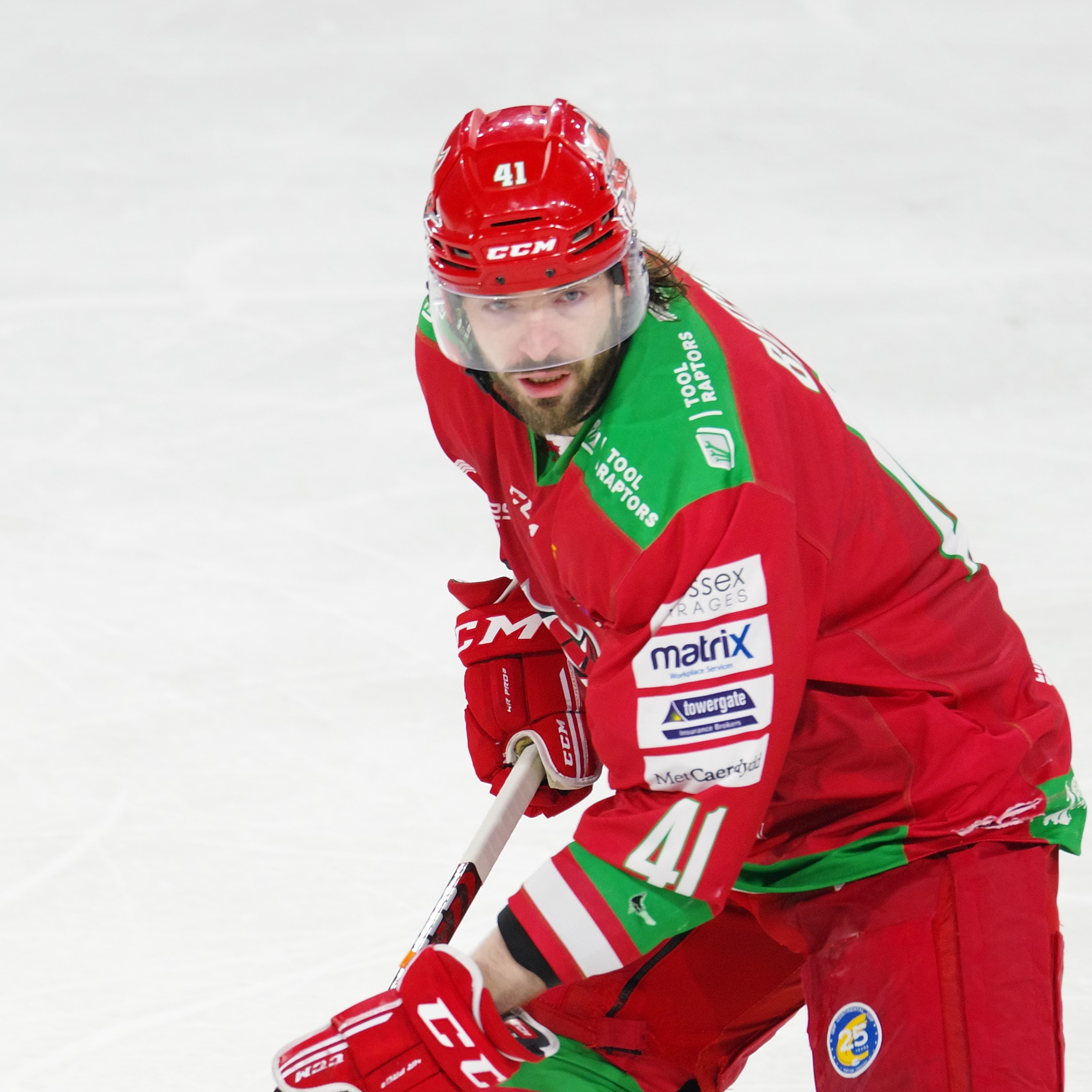
- Born: 15 January 1991 (age 35) Essex, England
- Height: 6 ft 4 in (193 cm)
- Weight: 220 lb (100 kg; 15 st 10 lb)
- Position: Defence
- Shoots: Left
- NIHL team Former teams: Bristol Pitbulls; Chelmsford Chieftains; Bay State Breakers; Swindon Wildcats; Manchester Storm; Cardiff Devils
- National team: Great Britain
- Playing career: 2011–present

Josh Batch (born 15 January 1991) is an English professional ice hockey defenceman currently playing for Bristol Pitbulls of the National Ice Hockey League and the British national team.
