= Niklas Friman =

Finnish ice hockey player

- Born: August 30, 1993 (age 32) Rauma, Finland
- Height: 6 ft 2 in (188 cm)
- Weight: 194 lb (88 kg; 13 st 12 lb)
- Position: Defence
- Shoots: Left
- Liiga team Former teams: Ilves; HC TPS; HPK; JYP Jyväskylä; Jokerit; Brynäs IF
- National team: Finland
- Playing career: 2012–present

Niklas Friman (born August 30, 1993) is a Finnish professional ice hockey defenceman currently playing for Ilves of the Liiga.

== Playing career ==
Friman made his SM-liiga debut playing with HC TPS during the 2011–12 SM-liiga season.

After splitting the 2021–22 season, between Jokerit of the Kontinental Hockey League (KHL) and former club HPK of the Liiga, Friman as a free agent signed his first contract in the Swedish Hockey League (SHL), agreeing to a two-year contract with Brynäs IF on 13 May 2022.

== Career statistics ==
=== Regular season and playoffs ===
			Regular season					Playoffs
Season	Team	League	GP	G	A	Pts	PIM	GP	G	A	Pts	PIM
2009–10	TPS	FIN U18 Q	9	2	2	4	2	—	—	—	—	—
2009–10	TPS	FIN U18	26	5	10	15	4	—	—	—	—	—
2009–10	TPS	FIN U20	1	0	0	0	0	—	—	—	—	—
2010–11	TPS	FIN U18 Q	5	2	2	4	2	—	—	—	—	—
2010–11	TPS	FIN U18	11	6	4	10	2	11	1	1	2	2
2010–11	TPS	FIN U20	26	2	2	4	4	—	—	—	—	—
2011–12	TPS	FIN U18	43	13	17	30	20	—	—	—	—	—
2011–12	TPS	SM-l	1	0	0	0	0	—	—	—	—	—
2011–12	Kiekkohait	FIN.3	3	0	2	2	0	—	—	—	—	—
2012–13	TPS	FIN U20	24	6	10	16	18	7	1	2	3	2
2012–13	TPS	SM-l	26	2	3	5	8	—	—	—	—	—
2013–14	TPS	FIN U20	8	1	4	5	12	—	—	—	—	—
2013–14	TPS	Liiga	45	1	4	5	18	—	—	—	—	—
2014–15	TPS	Liiga	50	0	4	4	24	—	—	—	—	—
2014–15	TUTO Hockey	Mestis	7	1	3	4	6	—	—	—	—	—
2015–16	TPS	Liiga	27	0	3	3	14	6	1	0	1	6
2016–17	HPK	Liiga	2	0	0	0	2	—	—	—	—	—
2016–17	JYP	Liiga	45	3	6	9	10	15	1	3	4	4
2016–17	JYP–Akatemia	Mestis	8	2	1	3	2	—	—	—	—	—
2017–18	HPK	Liiga	53	3	7	10	14	—	—	—	—	—
2018–19	HPK	Liiga	56	5	10	15	28	17	1	3	4	6
2019–20	HPK	Liiga	58	6	9	15	22	—	—	—	—	—
2020–21	Jokerit	KHL	26	1	5	6	8	1	0	0	0	0
2021–22	Jokerit	KHL	43	5	11	16	10	—	—	—	—	—
2021–22	HPK	Liiga	11	1	3	4	4	2	0	0	0	2
2022–23	Brynäs IF	SHL	51	3	7	10	14	—	—	—	—	—
2023–24	Ilves	Liiga	52	1	9	10	18	5	1	0	1	2
2024–25	Ilves	Liiga	58	8	13	21	24	11	0	2	2	0
2025–26	HC Ajoie	NL	31	1	2	3	2	—	—	—	—	—
Liiga totals			484	30	71	101	186	56	4	8	12	20

Medal record

Representing Finland

Ice hockey

Olympic Games
Gold medal – first place	2022 Beijing	

World Championships
Gold medal – first place	2022 Finland	

=== International ===
Year	Team	Event	Result	GP	G	A	Pts	PIM
2022	Finland	OG	1st place, gold medalist(s)	5	0	1	1	0
2022	Finland	WC	1st place, gold medalist(s)	10	1	3	4	2
2023	Finland	WC	7th	8	0	2	2	0
Senior totals				23	1	6	7	2
