= Josh Anderson (ice hockey) =

Canadian ice hockey player (born 1994)

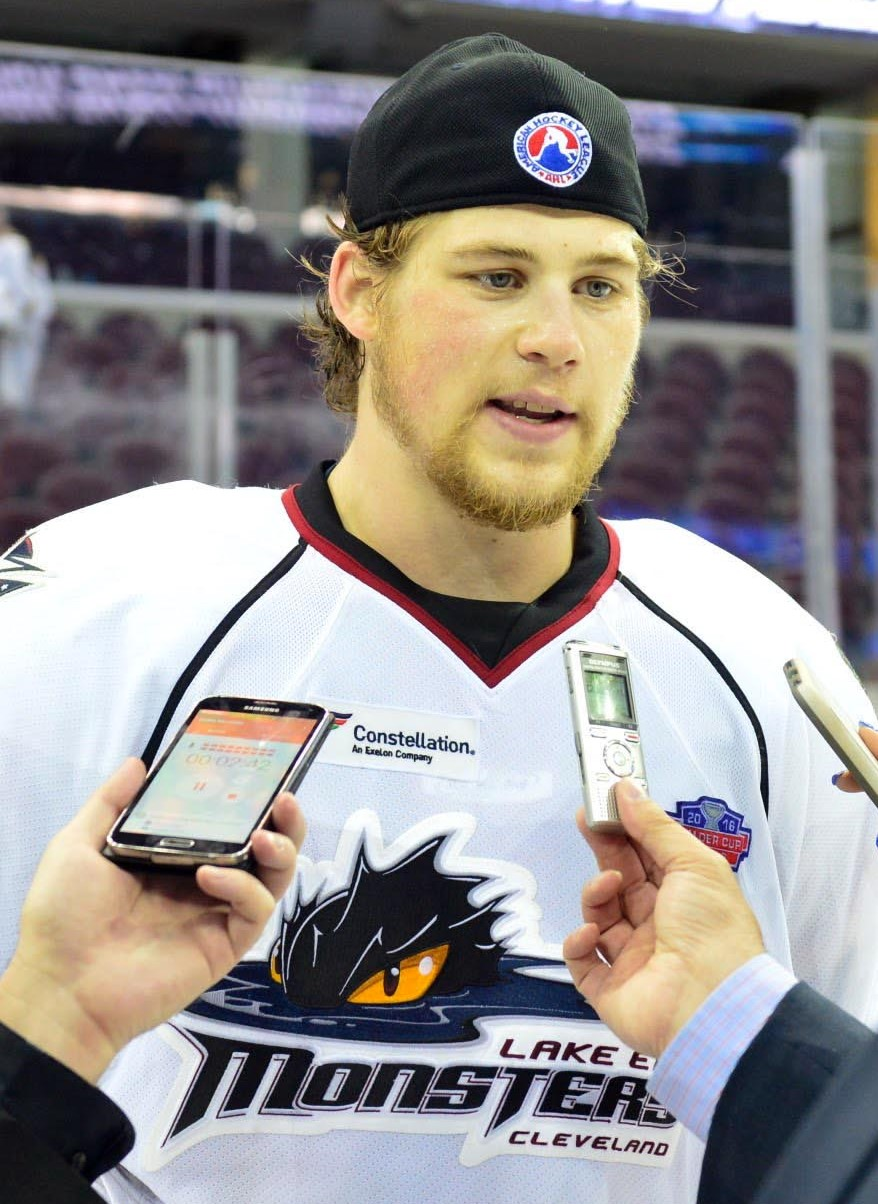
- Anderson with the Lake Erie Monsters in 2016
- Born: May 7, 1994 (age 32) Burlington, Ontario, Canada
- Height: 6 ft 3 in (191 cm)
- Weight: 226 lb (103 kg; 16 st 2 lb)
- Position: Winger
- Shoots: Right
- NHL team Former teams: Montreal Canadiens; Columbus Blue Jackets
- National team: Canada
- NHL draft: 95th overall, 2012; Columbus Blue Jackets
- Playing career: 2014–present

Joshua Anderson (born May 7, 1994) is a Canadian professional ice hockey player who is a winger and alternate captain for the Montreal Canadiens of the National Hockey League (NHL). He was selected in the fourth round, 95th overall, by the Columbus Blue Jackets in the 2012 NHL entry draft. A power forward known for speed and physicality, Anderson became known as "the Powerhorse".

== Playing career ==
=== Early years ===
Growing up in Burlington, Ontario, Anderson played both baseball and hockey. While eligible for the 2010 Ontario Hockey League (OHL) Priority Selection draft, he was ultimately passed over by all teams and returned to play midget with the Burlington Eagles of the South-Central Triple A Hockey League (SCTA). Reflecting back on this, Anderson stated he expected to be passed over as he was undersized for 16. Eventually attracting the attention of London Knights ownership who invited him to try out for the team, he secured a roster spot on the Knights beginning in the 2011–12 season.

=== Professional ===
==== Columbus Blue Jackets ====
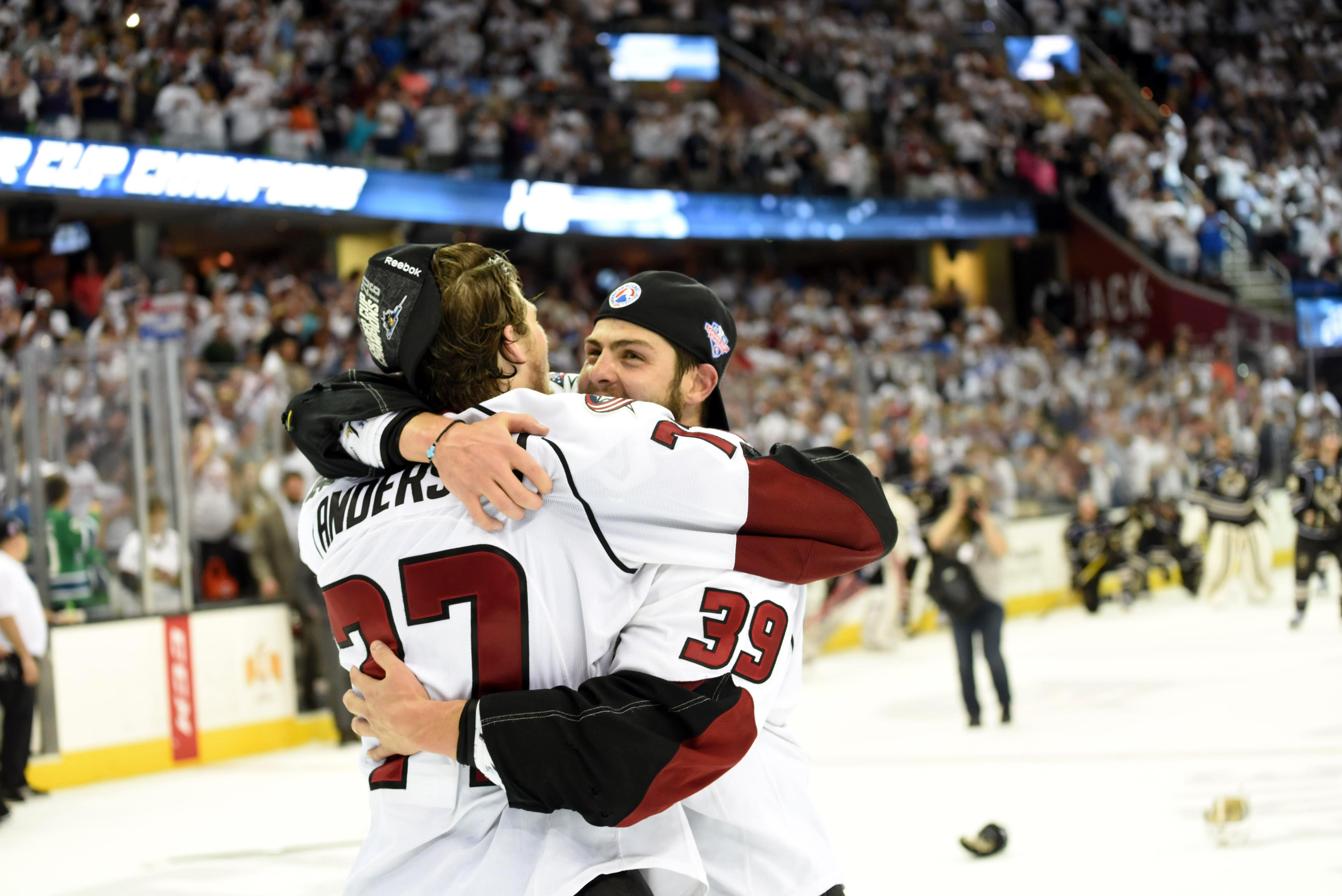
Anderson celebrating the Monsters' Calder Cup victory with teammate Michael Chaput.

Selected in the fourth round (95th overall) of the 2012 NHL entry draft by the Columbus Blue Jackets, Anderson was signed to a three-year, entry-level contract with the organization during his final major junior season with London in November 2013. He made his NHL debut on January 16, 2015 against the New York Rangers. During the 2015–16 season, Anderson underwent surgery to repair a small orbital fracture that had occurred during a preseason game, and was expected to miss up to four weeks to recover. Despite his setback, Anderson scored his first NHL goal on January 9, 2016, against Cam Ward of the Carolina Hurricanes. He was returned to the American Hockey League (AHL) shortly thereafter where he helped lead Columbus' affiliate Cleveland Monsters to the 2016 Calder Cup championship.

During the 2017–18 season, Anderson injured his knee in a game against the Washington Capitals and was expected to be out for four weeks. The following season was a breakout one for Anderson in which he played the entire 82-game campaign setting a career high 47 points as the Blue Jackets advanced to the second round of the Stanley Cup playoffs for the first time in franchise history.

In the 2019–20 season, Anderson was unable to replicate his offensive game, posting just 1 goal and 4 points in 26 games before suffering a posterior labral tear of his left shoulder against the Ottawa Senators on December 14, 2019. With the injury failing to respond to rehabilitation, Anderson had season-ending shoulder surgery on March 2, 2020, with an expected recovery period of 4–6 months.

==== Montreal Canadiens ====
On October 6, 2020, Anderson was traded to the Montreal Canadiens in exchange for Max Domi and a third round selection in the 2020 NHL entry draft. Two days later, he agreed to a seven-year, $38.5 million contract extension with the Canadiens. Anderson made an immediate impression upon arrival to Montreal, being dubbed a "powerhorse" by teammate Tomáš Tatar, a nickname that was widely adopted soon after. Recording 17 goals and 7 assists during the pandemic-shortened regular season, he was regarded as one of the standouts during a tough campaign overall for the team. Specifically, Anderson was noted for his ability to deliver "big game performances". This was reinforced during the 2021 Stanley Cup playoffs, where he recorded five goals over the course of the Canadiens' deep run to the Stanley Cup Finals, including a two-goal performance in Game 3 of the penultimate round versus the Vegas Golden Knights that first gave Montreal the series lead, with Anderson contributing the tying goal in the closing minutes as well as the subsequent overtime winner. In Game 4 of the ensuing Stanley Cup Finals against the Tampa Bay Lightning, with the Canadiens facing elimination, Anderson scored the first goal of the game and then won it in overtime, notching the team's only win in the series.

In preparation for the 2021–22 season, Anderson began playing on a line with Jonathan Drouin and former London Knights teammate Christian Dvorak, who had recently been acquired by the Canadiens. Drouin, missing much of the previous season due to anxiety, cited Anderson as a close friend and support through his difficulties, and would score the team's first goal of the season off of an assist by the foregoing. While the Canadiens struggled greatly in the early stages of the campaign, Anderson nonetheless managed a team-leading seven goals before sustaining an upper body injury on December 3, 2021 against the Colorado Avalanche. It was announced that he would miss between two and four weeks as a result. Anderson ultimately returned to the lineup in mid-January. As the team continued to struggle entering the latter half of play, team head coach Dominique Ducharme would be relieved on his duties and replaced with former NHLer Martin St-Louis, who revamped the lineup and created a new first line trio consisting of Anderson, Nick Suzuki and Cole Caufield that immediately began producing results. On March 1, 2022, Anderson scored his first career hat-trick in an 8–4 loss to the Winnipeg Jets. He later spent some games away from the first line, as St-Louis expressed a desire to revise his style of play to emphasize more than being a "physical guy."

After recording three goals and two assists in the first twelve games of the 2022–23 season, Anderson was suspended two games for boarding Golden Knights defenceman Alex Pietrangelo. Appearing in 69 total games, his season ended prematurely due to a high ankle sprain sustained on March 21, 2023 after being driven into the net by Tampa Bay Lightning defenceman Mikhail Sergachev. Collectively, Anderson finished play with 21 goals and an additional 11 assists to his credit.

The beginning of Anderson's 2023–24 season was marked by a lengthy scoring drought that became a topic of widespread sports media discussion. Upon reflection, he remarked that it was "very tough," in that "every day you think about when you're going to break out of that slump and start putting them in the back of the net." On December 4, 2024, Anderson registered an empty net goal against the Seattle Kraken, effectively bringing an end to his 27-game goalless streak. Thereafter, he scored two goals against goaltender Semyon Varlamov in a victory over the New York Islanders on December 16, his first scored against a goaltender in 34 games dating back to March 13 the season prior. Named as the first star of the game, he received a standing ovation from the crowd. Anderson then received the Molson Cup as the Canadiens' player of the month, ultimately having scored six goals and nine points over that span.

Following Anderson's declining point production in the prior season, he was given a new role for the 2024–25 season by coach Martin St. Louis, playing in the team's bottom six and with a new emphasis on penalty-killing. He reached a number of milestones over the course of the campaign, notably recording his 100th career NHL assist in a 5-2 win over the Tampa Bay Lightning on December 29. He later skated in his 600th career NHL game on March 12, 2025 versus the Seattle Kraken. Despite playing lower in the lineup, he finished the regular season with an improved 15 goals in 81 games. In April 2025, Anderson received recognition as the Canadiens' annual recipient of the Jacques Beauchamp Molson Trophy, awarded to the player deemed to have had a dominant role during the regular season. After three years near the bottom of the standings, the Canadiens qualified for the Stanley Cup playoffs.

Anderson had 14 goals and 9 assists in 72 games during the 2025–26 season, continuing his usage in a bottom six role. The Canadiens finished sixth overall in the NHL, qualifying to the 2026 Stanley Cup playoffs third in their division. Anderson was credited with a strong performance during the team's unexpectedly deep run to the Eastern Conference Final, and had five goals and two assists in 19 playoff games.

With the departure of Brendan Gallagher in the 2026 off-season, Anderson was named to replace him as an alternate captain of the Canadiens.

== International play ==
Medal record

Men's ice hockey

Representing Canada

World Championships
Silver medal – second place	2022 Finland	

In December 2013, Anderson and Knights teammate Bo Horvat were invited to partake in the selection camp process for the Canadian national junior team prior to annual World Junior Ice Hockey Championships. He scored one goal over the course of the tournament, whereas Canada ultimately finished fourth.

Following the 2021–22 campaign, with Montreal not qualifying for the Stanley Cup playoffs, Anderson accepted an invitation to join the Canadian national senior team at the 2022 IIHF World Championship in Tampere. He registered an assist in his tournament debut, a 5–3 win against Germany. Through nine tournament games, Anderson amassed a goal and six assists, including one during his country's 6–1 semifinal victory over the Czech Republic to reach the championship final, and another in the ensuing 4–3 overtime loss to Finland to earn a silver medal.

== Personal life ==
Anderson’s father, Gary, grew up in Dollard-des-Ormeaux on Montreal’s West Island as an avid Canadiens fan. Team alumnus Pete Mahovlich is the uncle of Anderson’s mother, Michelle, through marriage.

In May 2023, Anderson got engaged to Paola Finizio in Puglia, Italy. They were married in the same area in July 2024. Thereafter, the couple welcomed their first child in April 2025.

== Career statistics ==
=== Regular season and playoffs ===
			Regular season					Playoffs
Season	Team	League	GP	G	A	Pts	PIM	GP	G	A	Pts	PIM
2010–11	Burlington Eagles	SCTA	58	41	35	76	—	—	—	—	—	—
2010–11	Burlington Cougars	OJHL	4	0	2	2	0	1	0	0	0	0
2011–12	London Knights	OHL	64	12	10	22	34	19	2	3	5	4
2012–13	London Knights	OHL	68	23	26	49	77	19	1	2	3	23
2013–14	London Knights	OHL	59	27	24	51	81	9	5	4	9	14
2014–15	Springfield Falcons	AHL	52	7	10	17	76	—	—	—	—	—
2014–15	Columbus Blue Jackets	NHL	6	0	1	1	2	—	—	—	—	—
2015–16	Lake Erie Monsters	AHL	58	18	21	39	108	15	7	5	12	24
2015–16	Columbus Blue Jackets	NHL	12	1	3	4	2	—	—	—	—	—
2016–17	Columbus Blue Jackets	NHL	78	17	12	29	89	5	1	1	2	2
2017–18	Columbus Blue Jackets	NHL	63	19	11	30	42	6	1	2	3	21
2017–18	Cleveland Monsters	AHL	1	0	0	0	0	—	—	—	—	—
2018–19	Columbus Blue Jackets	NHL	82	27	20	47	60	10	1	2	3	22
2019–20	Columbus Blue Jackets	NHL	26	1	3	4	17	—	—	—	—	—
2020–21	Montreal Canadiens	NHL	52	17	7	24	38	22	5	1	6	12
2021–22	Montreal Canadiens	NHL	69	19	13	32	65	—	—	—	—	—
2022–23	Montreal Canadiens	NHL	69	21	11	32	72	—	—	—	—	—
2023–24	Montreal Canadiens	NHL	78	9	11	20	74	—	—	—	—	—
2024–25	Montreal Canadiens	NHL	81	15	12	27	90	5	0	1	1	20
2025–26	Montreal Canadiens	NHL	72	14	9	23	90	19	5	2	7	30
NHL totals			688	160	113	273	641	67	13	9	22	107

=== International ===
Year	Team	Event	Result	GP	G	A	Pts	PIM
2014	Canada	WJC	4th	7	1	0	1	0
2022	Canada	WC	2nd place, silver medalist(s)	10	1	7	8	10
Junior totals				7	1	0	1	0
Senior totals				10	1	7	8	10

== Awards and honours ==
Awards	Year	Ref
OHL
J. Ross Robertson Cup champion	2012, 2013	
CHL
CHL Canada/Russia Series	2013	
AHL
Calder Cup champion	2016	
Montreal Canadiens
Jacques Beauchamp Molson Trophy	2025	
