= Kristian Jakobsson =

Swedish ice hockey player

- Born: January 18, 1996 (age 29); Sweden
- Height: 5 ft 9 in (175 cm)
- Weight: 161 lb (73 kg; 11 st 7 lb)
- Position: Forward
- Shoots: Left
- GET team Former teams: Sparta Warriors; Modo Hockey; Mora IK
- NHL draft: Undrafted
- Playing career: 2015–present

Kristian Jakobsson (born January 18, 1996) is a Swedish ice hockey player. He is currently playing with Sparta Warriors of the GET-ligaen (SHL).

Jakobsson made his Swedish Hockey League debut playing with Modo Hockey during the 2014–15 SHL season.
