= Oskar Lang =

Swedish ice hockey player

- Born: December 4, 1996 (age 28); Arvika, Sweden
- Height: 5 ft 7 in (170 cm)
- Weight: 165 lb (75 kg; 11 st 11 lb)
- Position: Forward
- Shoots: Left
- SHL team: Leksands IF
- National team: Sweden
- Playing career: 2014–present

Oskar Lang (born December 4, 1996) is a Swedish professional ice hockey forward. He is currently playing with Leksands IF of the Swedish Hockey League (SHL).

== Playing career ==
Lang made his Swedish Hockey League debut playing with Leksands IF during the 2014–15 SHL season.

== International play ==
Lang joined the Swedish National Team, following completion of the 2021–22 season, and after six friendly games was later selected to the preliminary squad to compete at the 2022 IIHF World Championship in Finland on 11 May 2022.

== Career statistics ==
=== Regular season and playoffs ===
			Regular season					Playoffs
Season	Team	League	GP	G	A	Pts	PIM	GP	G	A	Pts	PIM
2013–14	Leksands IF	J20	33	8	10	18	16	5	0	2	2	0
2014–15	Leksands IF	J20	39	11	7	18	4	3	1	0	1	0
2014–15	Leksands IF	SHL	15	0	0	0	0	—	—	—	—	—
2015–16	Leksands IF	J20	3	1	2	3	0	3	0	1	1	2
2015–16	Leksands IF	Allsv	18	1	1	2	2	12	0	1	1	2
2016–17	Leksands IF	J20	3	2	1	3	0	—	—	—	—	—
2016–17	Leksands IF	SHL	45	7	9	16	16	—	—	—	—	—
2017–18	Leksands IF	Allsv	44	7	13	20	16	10	3	1	4	0
2018–19	Leksands IF	Allsv	51	9	24	33	12	12	2	3	5	2
2019–20	Leksands IF	SHL	50	11	9	20	16	—	—	—	—	—
2020–21	Leksands IF	SHL	44	6	13	19	18	4	0	0	0	0
2021–22	Leksands IF	SHL	50	9	5	14	4	3	1	1	2	0
2022–23	Leksands IF	SHL	52	11	21	32	12	3	0	3	3	2
2023–24	Leksands IF	SHL	51	9	14	23	12	7	2	1	3	2
2024–25	Leksands IF	SHL	49	11	11	22	6	—	—	—	—	—
SHL totals			356	64	82	146	88	17	3	5	8	4

=== International ===
Year	Team	Event	Result	GP	G	A	Pts	PIM
2022	Sweden	WC	6th	7	0	4	4	4
Senior totals				7	0	4	4	4
