= Jiří Černoch =

Czech ice hockey player

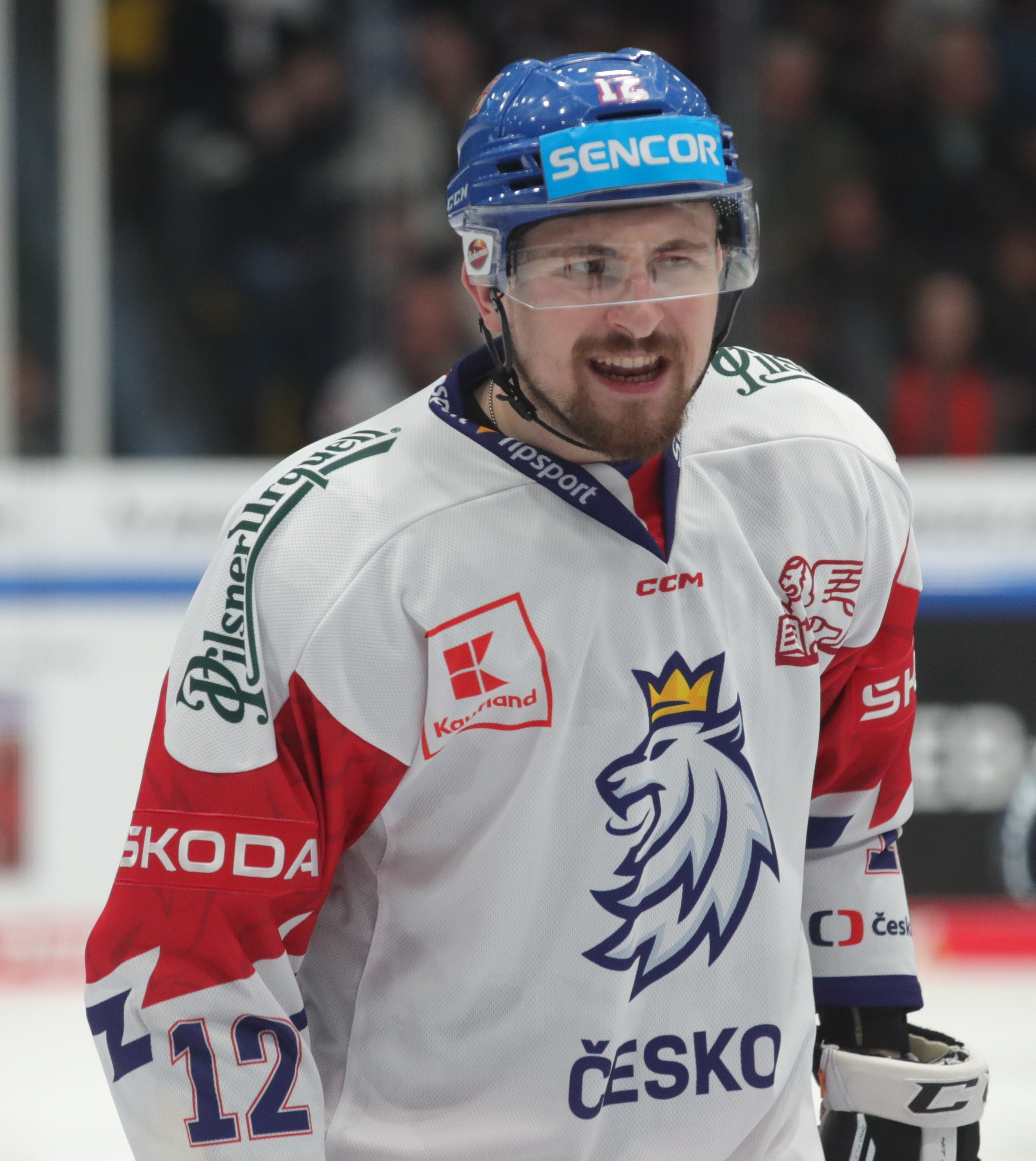
- Černoch with the Czech Republic in 2023
- Born: September 1, 1996 (age 29) Klatovy, Czech Republic
- Height: 5 ft 10 in (178 cm)
- Weight: 187 lb (85 kg; 13 st 5 lb)
- Position: Centre
- Shoots: Right
- ELH team Former teams: HC Karlovy Vary; HC Sparta Praha
- National team: Czech Republic
- Playing career: 2014–present

Medal record

Men's ice hockey

Representing the Czech Republic

World Championships
Bronze medal – third place	2022 Finland	

Jiří Černoch (born September 1, 1996) is a Czech professional ice hockey player who is a centre for HC Karlovy Vary of the Czech Extraliga (ELH).

Černoch made his Czech Extraliga debut playing with HC Sparta Praha during the 2014–15 Czech Extraliga season.

== Career statistics ==
=== International ===
Year	Team	Event	Result	GP	G	A	Pts	PIM
2013	Czech Republic	IH18	3rd place, bronze medalist(s)	4	0	0	0	0
2014	Czech Republic	U18	2nd place, silver medalist(s)	7	0	1	1	0
2022	Czech Republic	WC	3rd place, bronze medalist(s)	10	2	1	3	4
2023	Czech Republic	WC	8th	8	0	1	1	0
2026	Czech Republic	WC	5th	8	1	0	1	2
Junior totals				11	0	1	1	0
Senior totals				26	3	2	5	6
