= Mikko Lehtonen (ice hockey, born 1994) =

Finnish ice hockey player (born 1994)

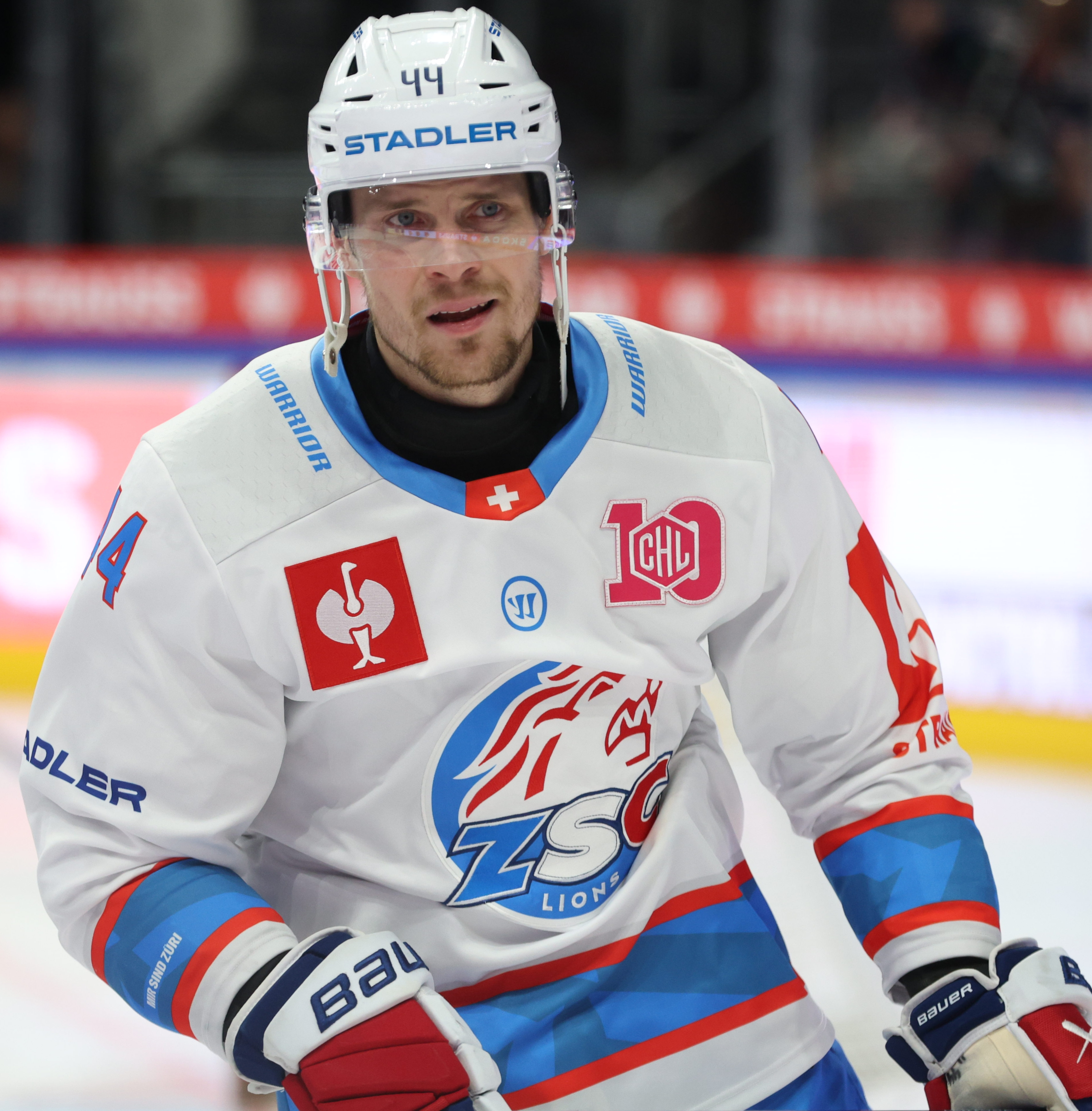
- Lehtonen with ZSC Lions in 2024
- Born: 16 January 1994 (age 32) Turku, Finland
- Height: 6 ft 0 in (183 cm)
- Weight: 194 lb (88 kg; 13 st 12 lb)
- Position: Defence
- Shoots: Left
- NL team Former teams: ZSC Lions; TPS; KooKoo; HV71; Tappara; Jokerit; Toronto Maple Leafs; Columbus Blue Jackets; SKA Saint Petersburg
- National team: Finland
- NHL draft: Undrafted
- Playing career: 2011–present

Mikko Kasper Lehtonen (born 16 January 1994) is a Finnish professional ice hockey player who is a defenceman for the ZSC Lions of the National League (NL). He has previously played for the Toronto Maple Leafs and Columbus Blue Jackets of the National Hockey League (NHL).

== Playing career ==
Lehtonen made his SM-liiga debut playing with TPS during the 2011–12 season. For the season 2015–2016, Lehtonen moved to the team KooKoo for a two-year contract. He made his breakthrough in the league and made all 60 regular rounds. Lehtonen ranked Juha Leimu of Pelicans in the second round of the SM Liiga defender's goal. In the 2016–17 season, he was KooKoo's second-best point-keeper and the most powerful defender until the threshold of the Liiga move. In February 2017, Lehtonen spent the rest of the season for the Swedish Hockey League (SHL) in HV71, and he won the Swedish Championship at the end of the season.

Lehtonen moved to Tappara for the 2017–18 season agreeing to an initial two-year contract. In 2018, Lehtonen left Tappara by mutual consent and re-joined HV71 of the SHL.

On 9 April 2019, Lehtonen as a free agent, left HV71, returning to Finland in signing a two-year contract with KHL participant, Jokerit.

Lehtonen appeared in 60 games with Jokerit during the 2019–20 season and registered 49 points (17 goals, 32 assists), which led all KHL defencemen. He represented Jokerit at the 2020 KHL All-Star Game and was named KHL Defenceman of the Month for three consecutive months from November to January. He had a goal and three assists in six KHL playoff games before the season's cancellation.

As a free agent, Lehtonen gained NHL interest, and on 4 May 2020, the Toronto Maple Leafs signed Lehtonen to a one-year entry-level contract for the 2020–21 season. With the North American season delayed due to the COVID-19 pandemic, on 1 August 2020, Lehtonen was returned to Jokerit on loan until the resumption of NHL training camp in November. Lehtonen was released from his contract with Jokerit on 20 November 2020, having collected 17 points through 17 games.

On 12 March 2021, Lehtonen was traded by the Maple Leafs to the Columbus Blue Jackets in exchange for Veini Vehviläinen.

After the 2020–21 season, Lehtonen signed a one-year contract to return to Columbus. However, on 12 October 2021, it was announced that he was suspended by the team and placed on unconditional waivers for the purpose of a buyout after failing to report to the Cleveland Monsters, the Blue Jackets AHL affiliate. As a free agent from the Blue Jackets, on 17 October 2021, Lehtonen returned to the KHL in agreeing to a four-year contract with Russian-based outfit, SKA Saint Petersburg.

Following the 2022 Russian invasion of Ukraine, Lehtonen decided to participate in the 2021–22 KHL postseason, despite the exit of most Finnish players and two of the KHL's non-Russia-based teams.

== International play ==
Medal record

Representing Finland

Ice hockey

Olympic Games
Gold medal – first place	2022 Beijing	
Bronze medal – third place	2026 Milano Cortina	

World Championships
Gold medal – first place	2019 Slovakia	
Gold medal – first place	2022 Finland	
Gold medal – first place	2026 Switzerland	

World Junior Championships
Gold medal – first place	2014 Sweden	

Internationally, Lehtonen has represented Finland at multiple events, including the World Championships in 2017 and 2019, winning gold at the 2019 tournament and earning recognition on the World Championship All-Star Team. He also skated for Finland at the Olympic Games in 2018 and 2022, getting gold and recognition on the Olympic All-Star Team at the 2022 games. In addition, he played at the 2014 World Junior Championships, where he captured gold.

== Career statistics ==
=== Regular season and playoffs ===
			Regular season					Playoffs
Season	Team	League	GP	G	A	Pts	PIM	GP	G	A	Pts	PIM
2010–11	TPS	FIN U18	18	8	15	23	14	12	0	3	3	20
2010–11	TPS	FIN U20	12	1	5	6	2	—	—	—	—	—
2011–12	TPS	FIN U18	1	0	1	1	6	8	1	2	3	6
2011–12	TPS	FIN U20	39	8	19	27	24	—	—	—	—	—
2011–12	TPS	SM-l	12	0	0	0	2	—	—	—	—	—
2012–13	TPS	FIN U20	39	6	23	29	30	9	1	1	2	16
2012–13	TPS	SM-l	13	0	1	1	2	—	—	—	—	—
2013–14	TUTO Hockey	Mestis	46	5	13	18	14	12	1	7	8	20
2014–15	TPS	Liiga	37	0	2	2	8	—	—	—	—	—
2014–15	TUTO Hockey	Mestis	19	0	9	9	4	15	3	6	9	8
2015–16	KooKoo	Liiga	60	12	10	22	16	—	—	—	—	—
2016–17	KooKoo	Liiga	43	6	19	25	20	—	—	—	—	—
2016–17	HV71	SHL	9	0	0	0	0	16	0	4	4	4
2017–18	Tappara	Liiga	55	12	17	29	24	16	1	3	4	10
2018–19	HV71	SHL	52	5	19	24	30	9	1	4	5	6
2019–20	Jokerit	KHL	60	17	32	49	20	6	1	3	4	12
2020–21	Jokerit	KHL	17	8	9	17	6	—	—	—	—	—
2020–21	Toronto Maple Leafs	NHL	9	0	3	3	4	—	—	—	—	—
2020–21	Columbus Blue Jackets	NHL	17	0	3	3	4	—	—	—	—	—
2021–22	SKA Saint Petersburg	KHL	15	1	7	8	2	15	1	6	7	2
2022–23	ZSC Lions	NL	52	7	23	30	24	9	2	3	5	0
2023–24	ZSC Lions	NL	51	4	26	30	10	15	0	2	2	6
2024–25	ZSC Lions	NL	50	5	19	24	8	16	1	8	9	4
2025–26	ZSC Lions	NL	48	7	17	24	28	9	0	2	2	0
Liiga totals			220	30	49	79	72	16	1	3	4	10
SHL totals			61	5	19	24	30	25	1	8	9	10
KHL totals			92	26	48	74	28	21	2	9	11	14
NHL totals			26	0	6	6	8	—	—	—	—	—
NL totals			201	23	85	108	70	49	3	15	18	10

=== International ===
Year	Team	Event	Result	GP	G	A	Pts	PIM
2011	Finland	U17	7th	5	1	1	2	4
2011	Finland	IH18	4th	5	0	1	1	0
2012	Finland	WJC18	4th	7	0	1	1	0
2014	Finland	WJC	1st place, gold medalist(s)	7	0	1	1	4
2017	Finland	WC	4th	10	2	0	2	0
2018	Finland	OG	6th	1	0	0	0	0
2019	Finland	WC	1st place, gold medalist(s)	10	1	6	7	0
2022	Finland	OG	1st place, gold medalist(s)	6	1	3	4	4
2022	Finland	WC	1st place, gold medalist(s)	10	2	10	12	2
2023	Finland	WC	7th	8	2	3	5	0
2024	Finland	WC	8th	8	1	2	3	0
2025	Finland	WC	7th	8	3	5	8	4
2026	Finland	OG	3rd place, bronze medalist(s)	2	0	0	0	0
2026	Finland	WC	1st place, gold medalist(s)	10	1	7	8	4
Junior totals				24	1	4	5	8
Senior totals				73	13	36	49	14

== Awards and honours ==
Award	Year
Mestis
Second All-Star Team	2014
SHL
Le Mat Trophy champion	2017
NL
Champion (ZSC Lions)	2024
International
WC All-Star Team	2019, 2022
Olympic All-Star Team	2022
WC Best Defenseman	2022
