= 2022 IIHF World Championship =

2022 edition of the IIHF World Championship

Tournament details
- Host country: Finland
- Venues: 2 (in 2 host cities)
- Dates: 13–29 May
- Opened by: Sauli Niinistö
- Teams: 16

Final positions
- Champions: Finland (4th title)
- Runners-up: Canada
- Third place: Czechia
- Fourth place: United States

Tournament statistics
- Games played: 64
- Goals scored: 375 (5.86 per game)
- Attendance: 356,955 (5,577 per game)
- Scoring leader: (Czech Republic) Roman Červenka (17 points)

Awards
- MVP: (Finland) Juho Olkinuora

The 2022 IIHF World Championship was hosted by Finland from 13 to 29 May 2022, as the International Ice Hockey Federation (IIHF) announced on 19 May 2017 in Cologne, Germany. The host cities of the World Championships were Tampere and Helsinki, of which Tampere's brand-new Nokia Arena served as the main venue of the games.

Since all lower divisions of the 2021 Men's Ice Hockey World Championships were cancelled due to the COVID-19 pandemic, all 16 teams from the previous year's top division were set to return this year. However, in the midst of the 2022 Russian invasion of Ukraine, Russia and Belarus were suspended from competing in all IIHF tournaments for at least a year. This marked the first time that Russia missed the top division of the World Championship since the dissolution of the Soviet Union. For this tournament, the suspended nations were replaced by Austria and France, the two highest-ranked teams in 2021 that had not already qualified. Additionally, the venue in Helsinki was moved from Helsinki Halli, previously known as Hartwall Arena, to Helsinki Ice Hall due to the former being owned by Russian oligarchs.

Finland defeated Canada 4–3 in overtime in the gold medal game for their fourth title and their first medal ever won on home ice. This marked the first time since the introduction of the playoff round in 1992 that the same two teams met in the gold medal game three tournaments in a row. Finland became the second team to win Olympic gold and World Championship gold in the same year, following Sweden in 2006. Czechia won the bronze medal, their first medal since 2012, after an 8–4 win over the United States.

The tournament saw multiple historic upsets: Austria's first victory against Czechia, and Denmark's first victory against Canada. In addition, it suffered from the lowest attendance in two decades, excluding the 2021 tournament played without audience; some attribute this to the absence of Russia.

== Venues ==
Tampere	2022 IIHF World Championship is located in Finland	Helsinki
Nokia Arena	2022 IIHF World Championship is located in Finland	Helsinki Ice Hall
Capacity: 13,455	2022 IIHF World Championship is located in Finland	Capacity: 8,200

== Participants ==
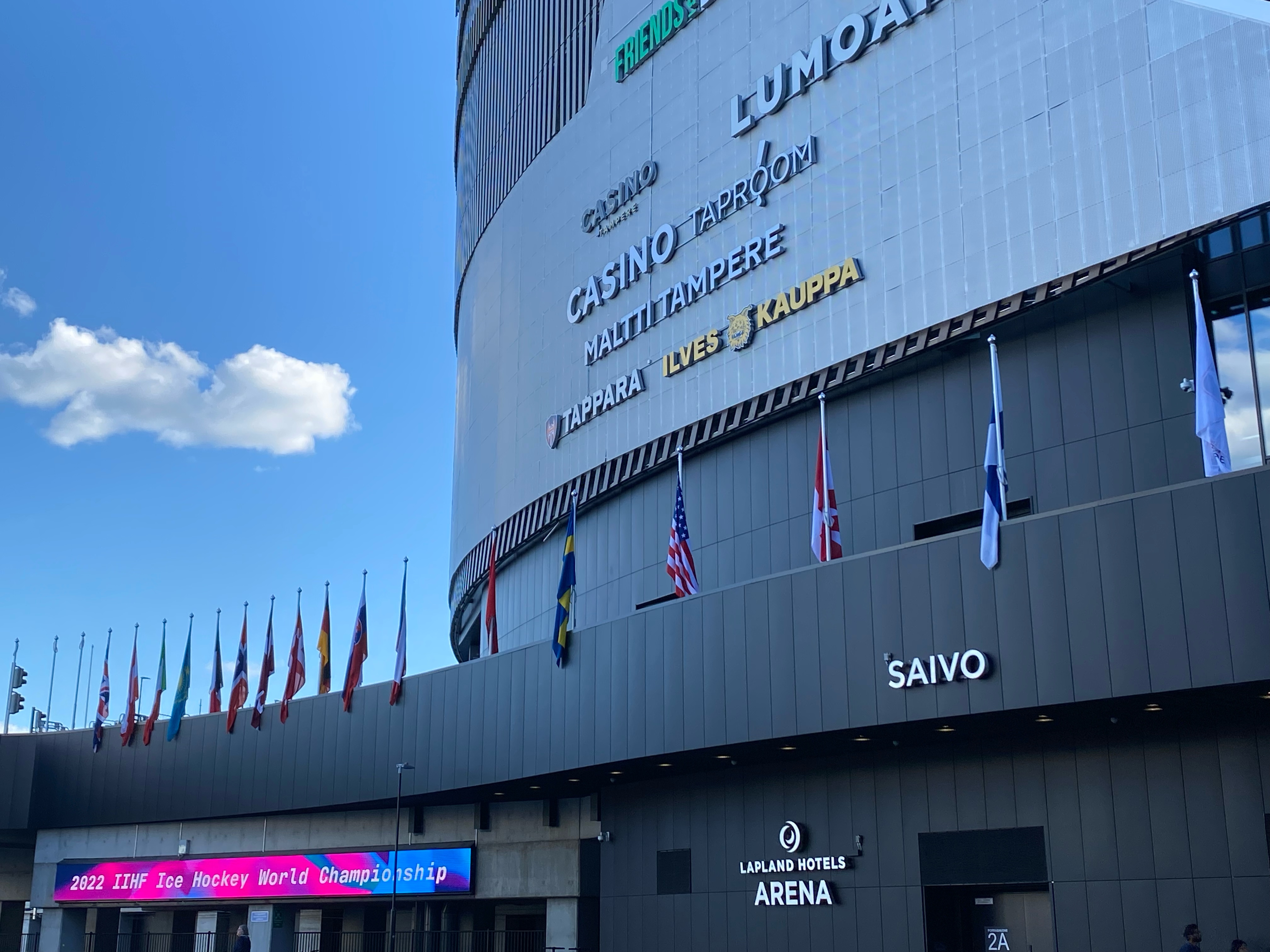
Flagpoles of the teams at the 2022 IIHF World Championship in Tampere, Nokia Arena.

Qualified as host

- Finland

Automatic qualifiers after the cancellation of the 2021 IIHF lower division championships

- ~~Belarus~~ (expelled)^{2}
- Canada
- Czechia
- Denmark
- Germany
- Great Britain
- Italy
- Kazakhstan
- Latvia
- Norway
- ~~ROC~~^{1} (expelled)^{2}
- Slovakia
- Sweden
- Switzerland
- United States

Qualifiers after Russia and Belarus were expelled

- Austria^{3}
- France^{3}

^{1} Pursuant to a December 2020 ruling by the Court of Arbitration for Sport on doping sanctions, Russian athletes and teams were prohibited from competing under the Russian flag or using the Russian national anthem at any Olympic Games or world championships through 16 December 2022, and could only compete as "neutral athlete[s]." For IIHF tournaments, the Russian team was to play under the name "ROC". Instead of the Russian national anthem being played at the 2021 World Championship, Piano Concerto No.1 by Pyotr Ilyich Tchaikovsky was to be played.
^{2} However, on 28 February 2022, the IIHF decided to expel ROC and Belarus from the tournament due to the Russian invasion of Ukraine.
^{3} Austria and France replaced Russia and Belarus.

== Seeding ==
The seedings in the preliminary round are based on the 2021 IIHF World Ranking, as of the end of the 2021 IIHF World Championship, using the serpentine system while allowing the organizer, "to allocate a maximum of two teams to separate groups".

Group A (Helsinki)

- Canada (1)
- ~~ROC~~ (3)
- Germany (5)
- Switzerland (8)
- Slovakia (9)
- Denmark (12)
- Kazakhstan (13)
- Italy (17)
- France (replaces ROC) (15)

Group B (Tampere)

- Finland (2)
- United States (4)
- Czechia (6)
- Sweden (7)
- Latvia (10)
- Norway (11)
- ~~Belarus~~ (14)
- Great Britain (16)
- Austria (replaces Belarus) (18)

== Rosters ==
Each team's roster consisted of at least 15 skaters (forwards, and defencemen) and 2 goaltenders, and at most 22 skaters and 3 goaltenders. All 16 participating nations, through the confirmation of their respective national associations, had to submit a "Long List" no later than two weeks before the tournament, and a final roster by the Passport Control meeting prior to the start of the tournament.

== Match officials ==
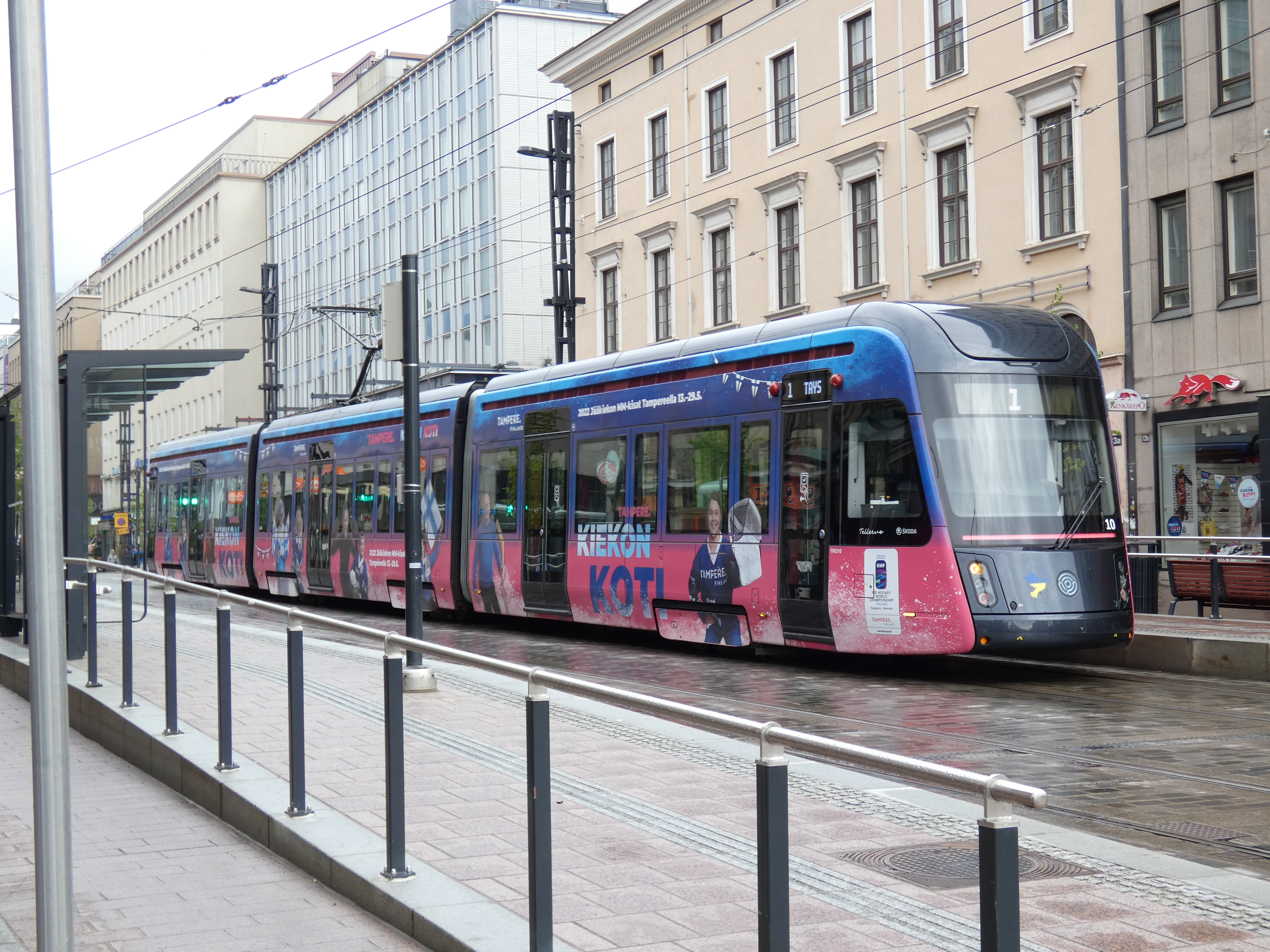
Tampere light rail advertising the 2022 World Championships

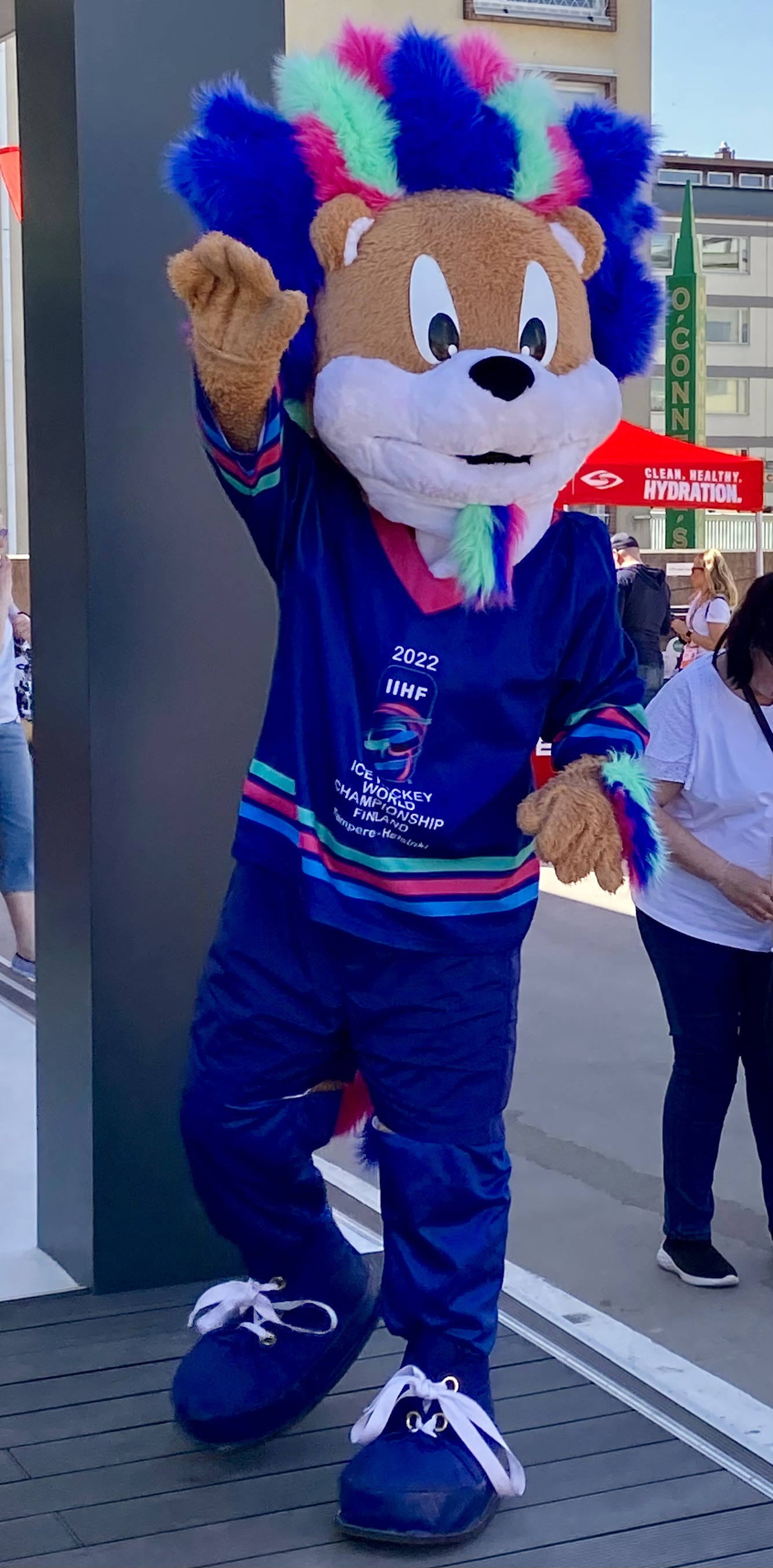
Miracleo, the official mascot

16 referees and linesmen were announced on 12 May 2022.

Referees	Linesmen
(Canada) Jeff Ingram; (Canada) Fraser Lawrence; (Czech Republic) Robin Šír; (Denmark) Mads Frandsen; (Finland) Lassi Heikkinen; (Finland) Kristian Vikman; (France) Pierre Dehaen; (Germany) Marian Rohatsch; (Latvia) Andris Ansons; (Norway) Roy Stian Hansen; (Slovakia) Peter Stano; (Sweden) Mikael Nord; (Sweden) Linus Öhlund; (Switzerland) Miroslav Stolc; (United States) Sean MacFarlane; (United States) Jake Rekucki	(Austria) Elias Seewald; (Canada) Maxime Chaput; (Canada) Nathan van Oosten; (Czech Republic) Josef Špůr; (Denmark) Andreas Krøyer; (Finland) Tommi Niittylä; (Finland) Hannu Sormunen; (France) Nicolas Constantineau; (Germany) Jonas Merten; (United Kingdom) Daniel Beresford; (Latvia) Dāvis Zunde; (Slovakia) Šimon Synek; (Sweden) Emil Yletyinen; (Switzerland) David Obwegeser; (United States) Nick Briganti; (United States) Jake Davis

== Preliminary round ==
The groups were announced on 7 June 2021, with the schedule being revealed on 18 August 2021.

=== Group A ===
Pos	Team	Pld	W	OTW	OTL	L	GF	GA	GD	Pts	Qualification or relegation
1	Switzerland	7	6	1	0	0	34	15	+19	20	Quarterfinals
2	Germany	7	5	0	1	1	26	20	+6	16	Quarterfinals
3	Canada	7	5	0	0	2	34	18	+16	15	Quarterfinals
4	Slovakia	7	4	0	0	3	23	19	+4	12 (Note: Slovakia 7–1 Denmark)	Quarterfinals
5	Denmark	7	4	0	0	3	18	18	0	12	
6	France	7	1	1	0	5	11	24	−13	5	
7	Kazakhstan	7	1	0	0	6	19	31	−12	3	
8	Italy (R)	7	0	0	1	6	12	32	−20	1	Relegation to 2023 Division I A

Source: IIHF
Rules for classification: 1) points; 2) head-to-head points; 3) head-to-head goal difference; 4) head-to-head number of goals scored; 5) result against closest best-ranked team outside tied teams; 6) result against second-best ranked team outside tied teams; 7) seeding before tournament.
(R) Relegated
Notes:

13 May 2022
France	2–4	Slovakia
Germany	3–5	Canada
14 May 2022
Denmark	9–1	Kazakhstan
Switzerland	5–2	Italy
Slovakia	1–2	Germany
15 May 2022
Italy	1–6	Canada
France	2–1	Kazakhstan
Denmark	0–6	Switzerland
16 May 2022
Slovakia	1–5	Canada
France	2–3	Germany
17 May 2022
Italy	1–2	Denmark
Switzerland	3–2	Kazakhstan
18 May 2022
France	2–1 (OT)	Italy
Switzerland	5–3	Slovakia
19 May 2022
Germany	1–0	Denmark
Canada	6–3	Kazakhstan
20 May 2022
Germany	9–4	Italy
Kazakhstan	3–4	Slovakia
21 May 2022
Denmark	3–0	France
Canada	3–6	Switzerland
Italy	1–3	Slovakia
22 May 2022
Kazakhstan	4–5	Germany
Switzerland	5–2	France
23 May 2022
Kazakhstan	5–2	Italy
Canada	2–3	Denmark
24 May 2022
Germany	3–4 (GWS)	Switzerland
Slovakia	7–1	Denmark
Canada	7–1	France

=== Group B ===
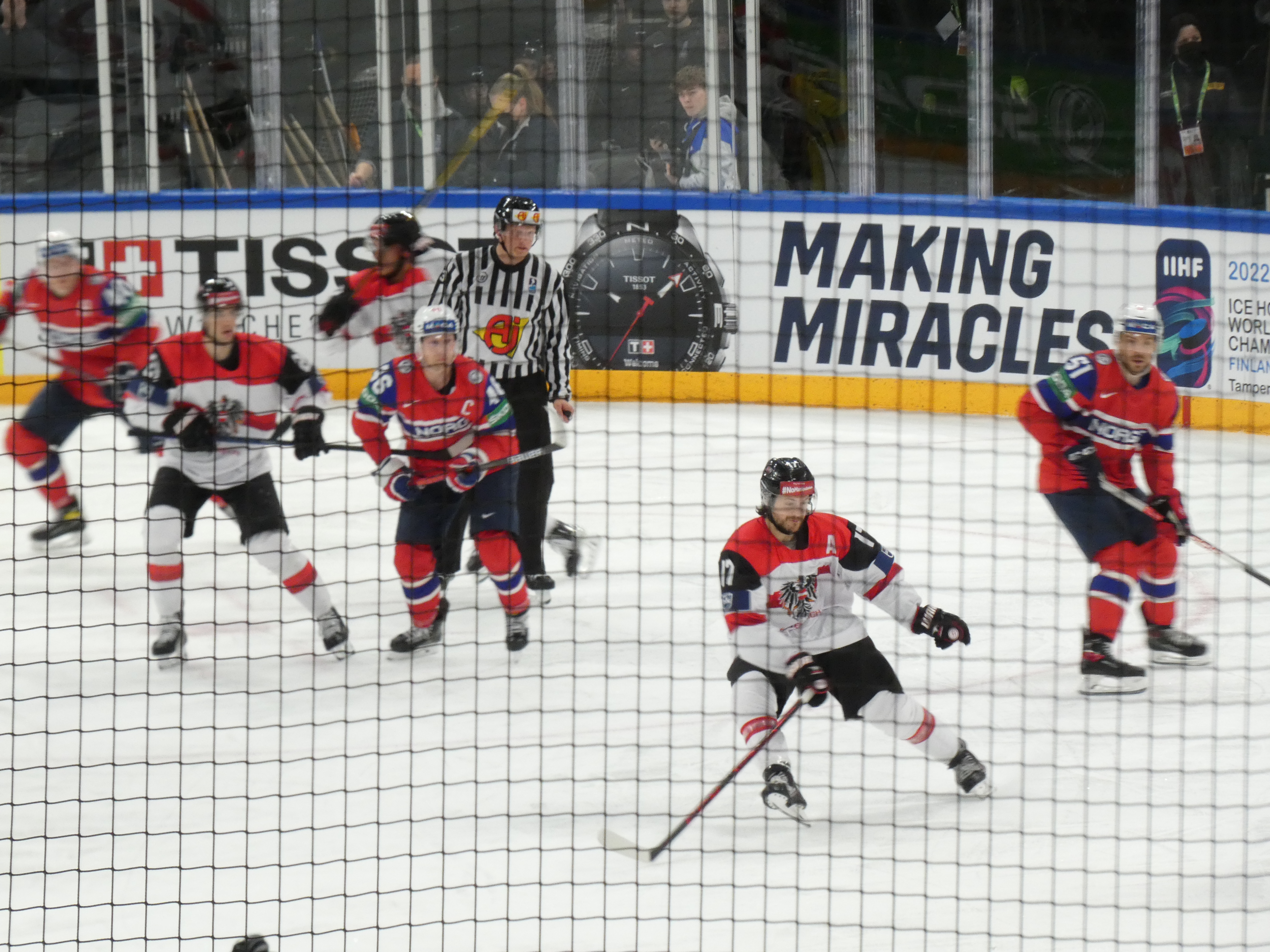
Austria against Norway

Pos	Team	Pld	W	OTW	OTL	L	GF	GA	GD	Pts	Qualification or relegation
1	Finland (H)	7	6	0	1	0	25	5	+20	19	Quarterfinals
2	Sweden	7	5	1	1	0	27	10	+17	18	Quarterfinals
3	Czechia	7	4	0	1	2	19	13	+6	13 (Note: United States 0–1 Czechia)	Quarterfinals
4	United States	7	3	2	0	2	18	12	+6	13	Quarterfinals
5	Latvia	7	2	1	0	4	14	20	−6	8	
6	Austria	7	1	1	2	3	16	22	−6	7	
7	Norway	7	1	1	0	5	15	29	−14	5	
8	Great Britain (R)	7	0	0	1	6	10	33	−23	1	Relegation to 2023 Division I A

Source: IIHF
Rules for classification: 1) points; 2) head-to-head points; 3) head-to-head goal difference; 4) head-to-head number of goals scored; 5) result against closest best-ranked team outside tied teams; 6) result against second-best ranked team outside tied teams; 7) seeding before tournament.
(H) Host; (R) Relegated
Notes:

13 May 2022
United States	4–1	Latvia
Finland	5–0	Norway
14 May 2022
Sweden	3–1	Austria
Czechia	5–1	Great Britain
Latvia	1–2	Finland
15 May 2022
Norway	4–3 (GWS)	Great Britain
Austria	2–3 (OT)	United States
Czechia	3–5	Sweden
16 May 2022
Latvia	3–2	Norway
Finland	4–1	United States
17 May 2022
Czechia	1–2 (GWS)	Austria
Sweden	6–0	Great Britain
18 May 2022
Norway	5–3	Austria
Finland	2–3 (GWS)	Sweden
19 May 2022
Great Britain	0–3	United States
Czechia	5–1	Latvia
20 May 2022
Great Britain	0–6	Finland
Latvia	4–3 (GWS)	Austria
21 May 2022
United States	3–2 (OT)	Sweden
Austria	0–3	Finland
Norway	1–4	Czechia
22 May 2022
Great Britain	3–4	Latvia
Sweden	7–1	Norway
23 May 2022
United States	0–1	Czechia
Austria	5–3	Great Britain
24 May 2022
Sweden	1–0	Latvia
United States	4–2	Norway
Finland	3–0	Czechia

== Playoff round ==
Gold medal game, starting line-ups

Quarter-finals
26 May
1A Switzerland	0
4B United States	3
26 May
1B Finland	4
4A Slovakia	2
26 May
2A Germany	1
3B Czechia	4
26 May
2B Sweden	3
3A Canada (OT)	4

Semi-finals
28 May
2 Finland	4
7 United States	3
28 May
5 Canada	6
6 Czechia	1

Final
29 May
2 Finland (OT)	4
5 Canada	3
Third place
29 May
6 Czechia	8
7 United States	4

== Final standings ==
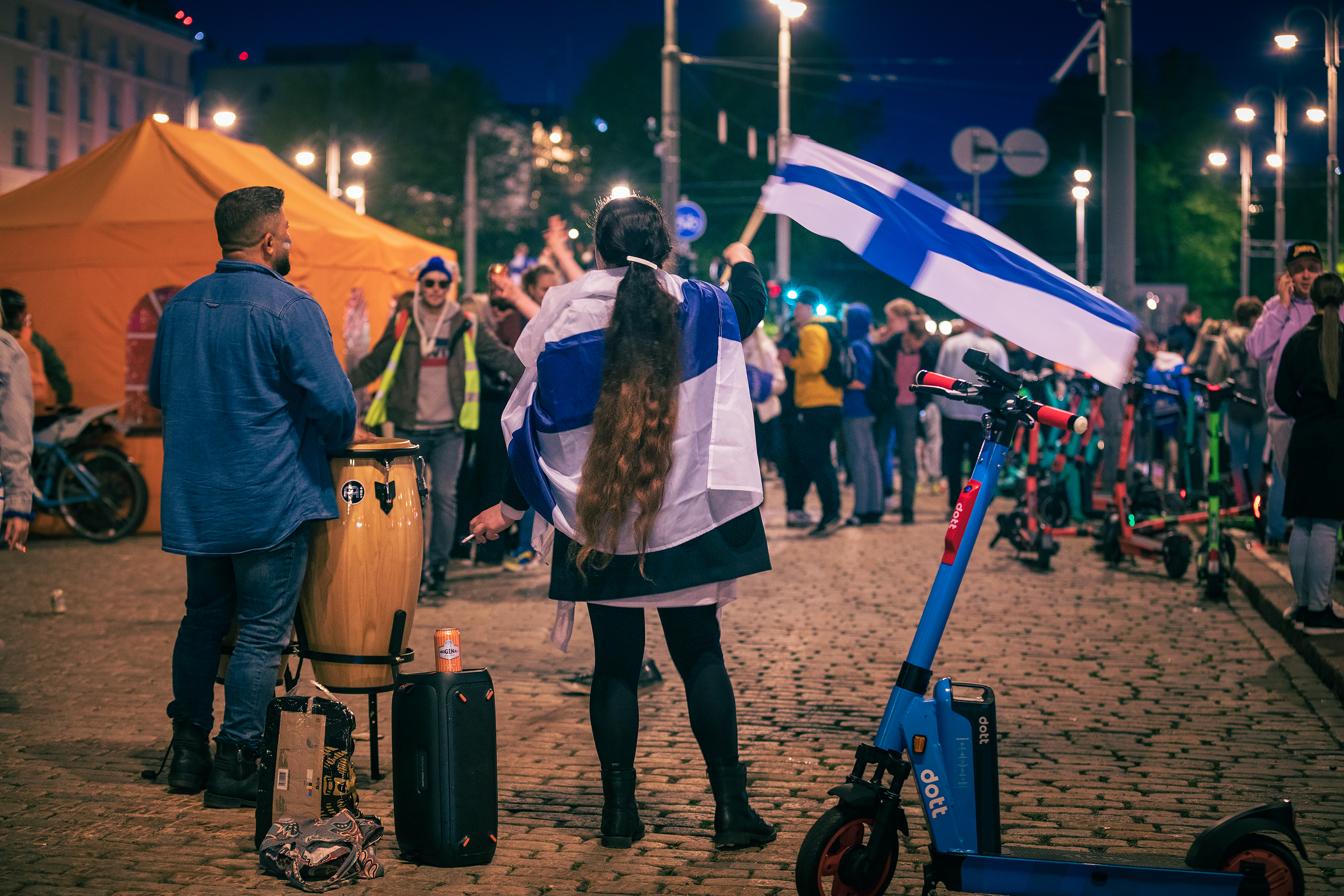
Gold celebrations in Kaartinkaupunki, Helsinki

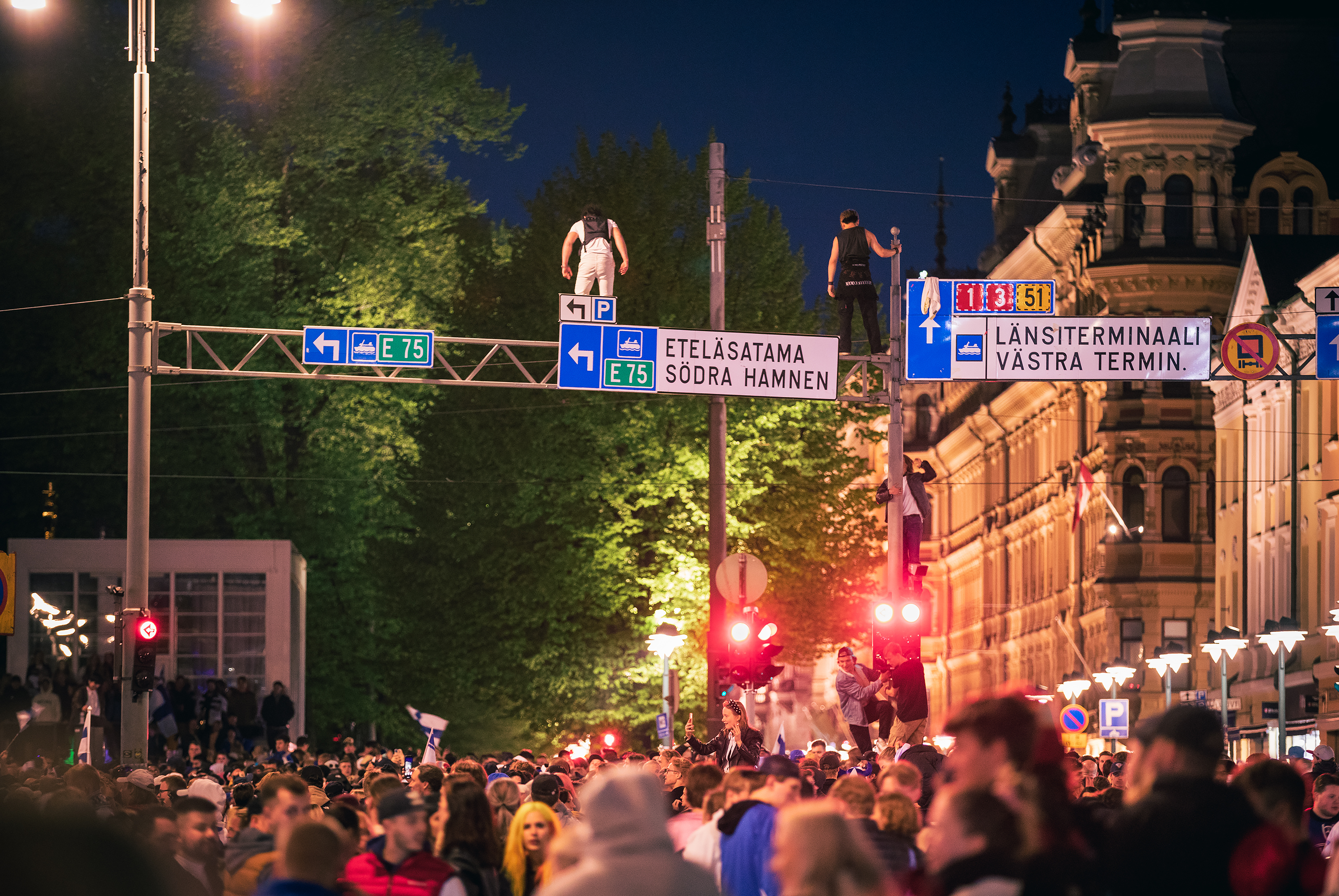
Pohjoisesplanadi street during the gold celebrations

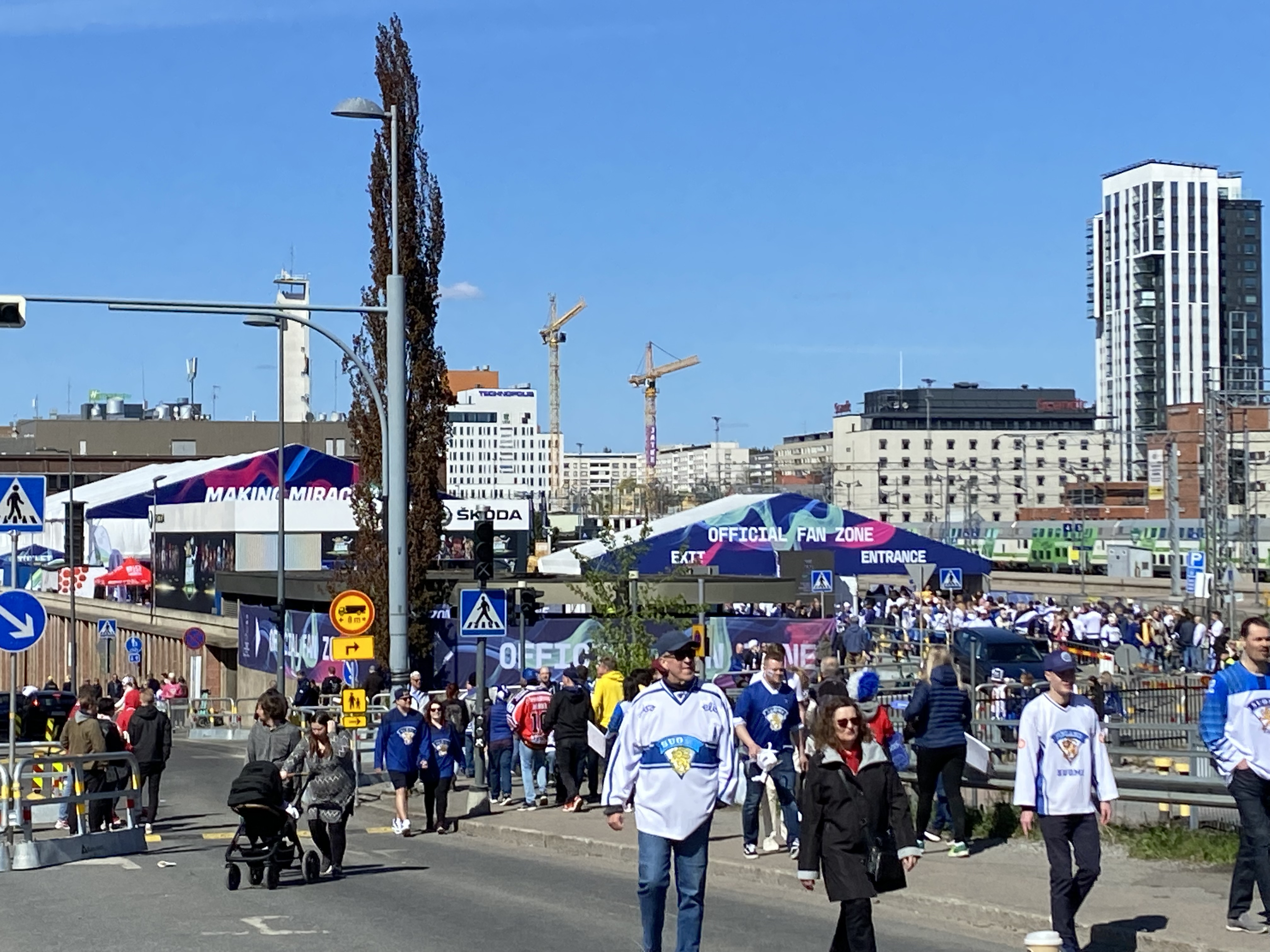
Official Fan Zone in Tampere

Pos	Grp	Team	Pld	W	OTW	OTL	L	GF	GA	GD	Pts	Final result
1	B	Finland (H)	10	8	1	1	0	37	13	+24	27	Champions
2	A	Canada	10	6	1	1	2	47	26	+21	21	Runners-up
3	B	Czechia	10	6	0	1	3	32	24	+8	19	Third place
4	B	United States	10	4	2	0	4	28	24	+4	16	Fourth place
5	A	Switzerland	8	6	1	0	1	34	18	+16	20	Eliminated in Quarter-finals
6	B	Sweden	8	5	1	2	0	30	14	+16	19	Eliminated in Quarter-finals
7	A	Germany	8	5	0	1	2	27	24	+3	16	Eliminated in Quarter-finals
8	A	Slovakia	8	4	0	0	4	25	23	+2	12	Eliminated in Quarter-finals
9	A	Denmark	7	4	0	0	3	18	18	0	12	Eliminated in Group stage
10	B	Latvia	7	2	1	0	4	14	20	−6	8	Eliminated in Group stage
11	B	Austria	7	1	1	2	3	16	22	−6	7	Eliminated in Group stage
12	A	France	7	1	1	0	5	11	24	−13	5	Eliminated in Group stage
13	B	Norway	7	1	1	0	5	15	29	−14	5	Eliminated in Group stage
14	A	Kazakhstan	7	1	0	0	6	19	31	−12	3	Eliminated in Group stage
15	A	Italy	7	0	0	1	6	12	32	−20	1	2023 IIHF World Championship Division I
16	B	Great Britain	7	0	0	1	6	10	33	−23	1	2023 IIHF World Championship Division I

Source: IIHF
Rules for classification: 1) position in the group; 2) number of points; 3) goal difference; 4) goals scored; 5) seeding before tournament.
(H) Host

== Statistics ==
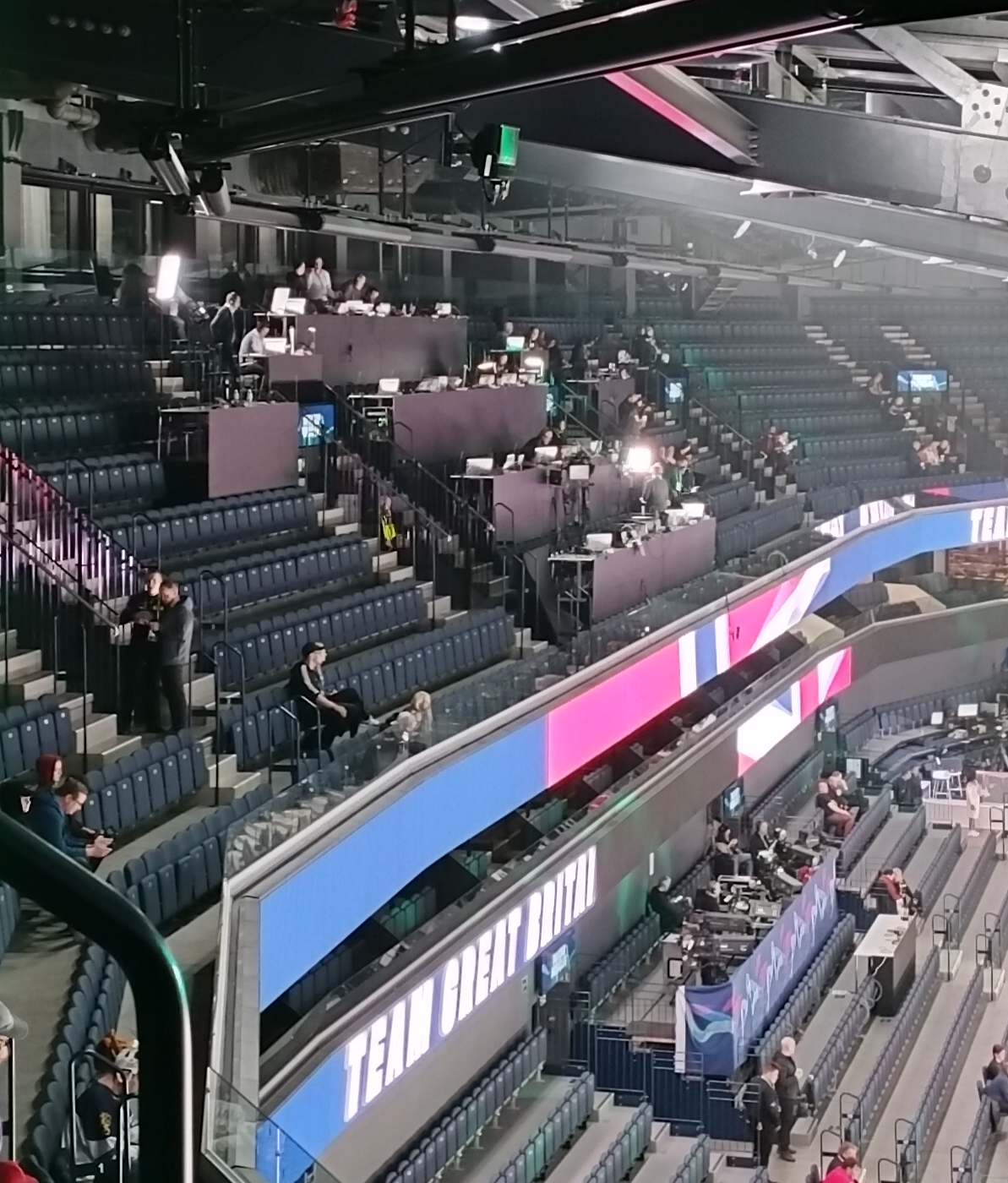
Nokia Arena's commentator seats

=== Scoring leaders ===
List shows the top skaters sorted by points, then goals.

Player	GP	G	A	Pts	+/−	PIM	POS
(Czech Republic) Roman Červenka	10	5	12	17	+4	10	F
(Canada) Drake Batherson	10	3	11	14	+8	6	F
(Canada) Dylan Cozens	10	7	6	13	+12	2	F
(Canada) Pierre-Luc Dubois	10	7	6	13	+11	12	F
(Switzerland) Denis Malgin	8	5	7	12	+5	4	F
(Czech Republic) David Krejčí	10	3	9	12	+6	4	F
(Finland) Mikko Lehtonen	10	2	10	12	+7	2	D
(Finland) Mikael Granlund	9	5	6	11	+2	2	F
(Czech Republic) David Pastrňák	7	7	3	10	+3	2	F
(Finland) Sakari Manninen	10	6	4	10	+2	2	F

GP = Games played; G = Goals; A = Assists; Pts = Points; +/− = Plus/Minus; PIM = Penalties in Minutes; POS = Position
Source: IIHF.com

=== Goaltending leaders ===
Only the top five goaltenders, based on save percentage, who have played at least 40% of their team's minutes, are included in this list.

Player	TOI	GA	GAA	SA	Sv%	SO
(Latvia) Artūrs Šilovs	196:21	4	1.22	84	95.24	0
(Finland) Juho Olkinuora	486:42	9	1.11	174	94.83	4
(Sweden) Magnus Hellberg	245:00	6	1.47	88	93.18	1
(France) Henri-Corentin Buysse	237:58	7	1.76	102	93.14	0
(Canada) Chris Driedger	341:48	10	1.76	117	91.45	0

TOI = time on ice (minutes:seconds); SA = shots against; GA = goals against; GAA = goals against average; Sv% = save percentage; SO = shutouts
Source: IIHF.com

== Awards ==
The awards were announced on 29 May 2022.

=== Individual awards ===
Position	Player
Goaltender	(Finland) Juho Olkinuora
Defenceman	(Finland) Mikko Lehtonen
Forward	(Czech Republic) Roman Červenka

=== Media All Stars ===
Position	Player
Goaltender	(Finland) Juho Olkinuora
Defenceman	(Finland) Mikko Lehtonen
Defenceman	(United States) Seth Jones
Forward	(Czech Republic) Roman Červenka
Forward	(Canada) Pierre-Luc Dubois
Forward	(Finland) Sakari Manninen
MVP	(Finland) Juho Olkinuora

== IIHF honors and awards ==
The IIHF Hall of Fame induction and awards ceremony was delayed from the 2020 IIHF World Championship due to the COVID-19 pandemic. The 2020 inductees and award recipients were honored during the medal ceremonies at the 2022 IIHF World Championship in Tampere. Canadian player Ryan Smyth was chosen for induction in 2020, but was delayed until 2024.

IIHF Hall of Fame inductees

- Chung Mong-won, South Korea
- Mathias Seger, Switzerland
- Mark Streit, Switzerland
- Kimmo Timonen, Finland
- Alexei Yashin, Russia

Award recipients

- Zoltán Kovács of Hungary received the Paul Loicq Award for outstanding contributions to international ice hockey.
- Ron Berteling of the Netherlands received the Torriani Award for a player with an outstanding career from non-top hockey nation.
