= 2025–26 BCHL season =

64th season of the British Columbia Hockey League

- League: BCHL
- Sport: Junior ice hockey
- Duration: Regular Season; 19 September–29 March; Playoffs; 3 April–22 May
- Games: 540
- Teams: 20
- Total attendance: 622,442

Regular season
- Season champions: West Kelowna Warriors

Playoffs
- Finals champions: Brooks Bandits
- Runners-up: Nanaimo Clippers
- Finals MVP: Zach Zahara

BCHL seasons
- ← 2024–25 2026–27 →

The 2025–26 BCHL season is the 64th season of the British Columbia Hockey League (BCHL).

The league championship trophy, formerly known as the Fred Page Cup, was renamed the Rogers BCHL Cup pursuant to a sponsorship agreement with Rogers Communications.

The annual showcase event took place from 12 – 16 October 2025 in the Fraser Valley cities of Abbotsford and Chilliwack. The event is an opportunity for NCAA coaches and NHL scouts to observe all 20 teams playing two regular season games each. Games on October 12th, 13th, 14th and 16th took place at Abbotsford Centre while games October 15th were held at the Chilliwack Coliseum.

The Salmon Arm Silverbacks franchise was sold to Forge Sports Group Ltd. The BCHL Board of Governors approved the franchise sale at its semi-annual Governors Meeting in Spruce Grove, Alberta.

The Penticton Vees did not field a team this year, after the Western Hockey League (WHL) established an expansion franchise also called the Penticton Vees and based in the City of Penticton. However, the BCHL said that the Vees ownership would retain its membership in the league while it sought to relocate the franchise to another market.

Conference	Division	Team	Home	Arena
Coastal	West	Alberni Valley Bulldogs	Port Alberni	Weyerhaeuser Arena
Coastal	West	Cowichan Valley Capitals	North Cowichan	Cowichan Community Centre
Coastal	West	Nanaimo Clippers	Nanaimo	Frank Crane Arena
Coastal	West	Powell River Kings	Powell River	Hap Parker Arena
Coastal	West	Victoria Grizzlies	Victoria	The Q Centre
Coastal	East	Chilliwack Chiefs	Chilliwack	Chilliwack Coliseum
Coastal	East	Coquitlam Express	Coquitlam	Poirier Sport & Leisure Complex
Coastal	East	Langley Rivermen	Langley	George Preston Recreation Centre
Coastal	East	Prince George Spruce Kings	Prince George	Kopar Memorial Arena
Coastal	East	Surrey Eagles	Surrey	South Surrey Arena
Interior	West			
Interior	West	Cranbrook Bucks	Cranbrook	Western Financial Place
Interior	West	Salmon Arm Silverbacks	Salmon Arm	Shaw Centre
Interior	West	Trail Smoke Eaters	Trail	Cominco Arena
Interior	West	Vernon Vipers	Vernon	Kal Tire Place
Interior	West	West Kelowna Warriors	West Kelowna	Royal LePage Place
Interior	East	Blackfalds Bulldogs	Blackfalds	Eagle Builders Centre
Interior	East	Brooks Bandits	Brooks	Centennial Regional Arena
Interior	East	Okotoks Oilers	Okotoks	Okotoks Centennial Arena
Interior	East	Sherwood Park Crusaders	Sherwood Park	Sherwood Park Arena
Interior	East	Spruce Grove Saints	Spruce Grove	Grant Fuhr Arena

Map of BCHL teams
Coastal West Coastal East Interior West Interior East

== Regular season ==
The regular season ran from 19 September 2025 to 29 March 2026 with each of the 20 clubs playing 54 games. The top 4 teams in each division advanced to the post-season playoffs. The West Kelowna Warriors were awarded the Ron Boileau Memorial Trophy as the team with the best regular season record.

Coastal East Division
TEAM NAMES	GP	W	L	OTL	SOL	Pts
Prince George Spruce Kings	54	34	17	3	1	71
Chilliwack Chiefs	54	29	20	3	1	62
Coquitlam Express	54	29	21	2	1	61
Langley Rivermen	54	28	25	1	0	57
Surrey Eagles	54	8	40	6	0	22
Coastal West Division
TEAM NAMES	GP	W	L	OTL	SOL	Pts
Cowichan Valley Capitals	54	38	13	3	0	79
Nanaimo Clippers	54	30	18	6	0	66
Alberni Valley Bulldogs	54	26	25	3	0	55
Victoria Grizzlies	54	26	25	3	0	55
Powell River Kings	54	12	28	3	1	28
Interior East Conference
TEAM NAMES	GP	W	L	OTL	SOL	PTS
Brooks Bandits	54	37	11	6	0	80
Blackfalds Bulldogs	54	37	15	2	0	76
Sherwood Park Crusaders	54	29	19	6	0	64
Spruce Grove Saints	54	29	22	2	1	61
Okotoks Oilers	54	20	31	2	1	43
Interior West Conference
TEAM NAMES	GP	W	L	OTL	SOL	PTS
West Kelowna Warriors	54	40	11	3	0	83
Trail Smoke Eaters	54	30	23	1	0	61
Salmon Arm Silverbacks	54	22	26	4	2	50
Cranbrook Bucks	54	20	28	5	1	46
Vernon Vipers	54	15	32	7	0	37

== Playoffs ==
2026 League championship
Rogers BCHL Cup

Tournament details
- Dates: 3 April–22 May
- Teams: 16
- Defending champions: Brooks Bandits

Final positions
- Champions: Brooks Bandits (2nd title)
- Runners-up: Nanaimo Clippers
- Semifinalists: Prince George Spruce Kings; Cranbrook Bucks

Tournament statistics
- Games played: 85
- Goals scored: 495 (5.82 per game)
- Attendance: 114,879 (1,352 per game)

Official website
- 2026 BCHL playoffs

Pursuant to the new playoff format, the top four teams in each division advanced to the playoffs. The matchups in the first round were between the first and fourth seeds, and the second and third seeds, respectively. The second round determined the winner of each division, with division winners advancing to the conference finals, followed by the championship series.

Division Semifinal
Prince George	4
Langley	3
Chilliwack	4
Coquitlam	1
Cowichan Valley	4
Victoria	3
Nanaimo	4
Alberni Valley	1
Brooks	4
Spruce Grove	0
Blackfalds	2
Sherwood Park	4
Trail	0
Salmon Arm	4
West Kelowna	1
Cranbrook	4

Division Final
Prince George	4
Chilliwack	3
Cowichan Valley	3
Nanaimo	4
Brooks	4
Sherwood Park	3
Salmon Arm	3
Cranbrook	4

Conference Final
Nanaimo	4
Prince George	0
Brooks	4
Cranbrook	1

Rogers BCHL Cup Final
Nanaimo	1
Brooks	4

Source: "BCHL 2026 playoffs". bchl.ca. British Columbia Hockey League.

== Scoring leaders ==
GP = Games Played, G = Goals, A = Assists, PTS = Points, PIM = Penalties In Minutes

Player	Team	GP	G	A	PTS	PIM
Nico Grabas	Chilliwack Chiefs	50	31	45	76	51
Jack Plandowski	Chilliwack Chiefs	54	29	46	75	14
Jack Good	Brooks Bandits	54	22	48	70	14
Zachary Benayon	Langley Rivermen	53	36	32	68	22
Nikita Ivashchenko	Blackfalds Bulldogs	53	31	37	68	32
Reese Shaw	Chilliwack Chiefs	45	27	40	67	14
Tai Ushio	Prince George Spruce Kings	47	31	35	66	79
Anthony Hall	Cowichan Valley Capitals	52	21	43	64	16
Ruslan Jmaldinov	West Kelowna Warriors	53	28	33	61	8
Thomas Neu	Blackfalds Bulldogs	53	27	34	61	66

== Leading goaltenders ==
Note: GP = Games Played, Mins = Minutes Played, W = Wins, L = Losses, OTL = Overtime Losses, GA = Goals Against, SO = Shutouts, Sv% = Save Percentage, GAA = Goals Against Average.

Player	Team	GP	Mins	W	L	OTL	GA	SO	Sv%	GAA
Angelo Zol	West Kelowna Warriors	36	2179	27	8	1	72	6	.925	1.98
Oliver Kiraly	Blackfalds Bulldogs	23	1304	14	6	2	50	4	.906	2.30
Carson Mertz	Blackfalds Bulldogs	29	1664	21	7	0	65	1	.906	2.34
Rhett Stoesser	Cowichan Valley Capitals	35	2111	26	7	2	88	2	.900	2.50
Bor Glavic	West Kelowna Warriors	18	1083	13	3	2	48	1	.901	2.79

== Award winners ==
Brett Hull Trophy (Top Scorer)
Nico Grabas (Chilliwack Chiefs)
Campbell Blair Trophy (Top Defencemen)
Ozbej Rep (Prince George Spruce Kings)
Bruce Allison Memorial Trophy (Rookie of the Year)
Boris Borin (Chilliwack Chiefs)
Bob Fenton Trophy (Most Sportsmanlike)
Jack Plandowski (Chilliwack Chiefs)
Michael Garteig Trophy (Top Goaltender)
Angelo Zol (West Kelowna Warriors)
Wally Forslund Memorial Trophy (Best Goaltending Duo)
Angelo Zol & Bor Glavič (West Kelowna Warriors)
Vern Dye Memorial Trophy (regular-season MVP)
Angelo Zol (West Kelowna Warriors)
Jeff Tambellini Trophy (Playoff MVP)
To be announced
Joe Tennant Memorial Trophy (Coach of the Year)
Cam Keith (Cowichan Valley Capitals)
Jim Hughson Award for Broadcaster of the Year
Evan Hammond (Alberni Valley Bulldogs)
Ron Boileau Memorial Trophy (Best Regular Season Record)
West Kelowna Warriors
Rogers BCHL Cup (League Champions)
Brooks Bandits

Source: "Year-end awards". bchl.ca. British Columbia Hockey League.

== See also ==
- 2025 in ice hockey
- 2025 NHL entry draft
- List of BCHL seasons
