= 2024–25 BCHL season =

- League: BCHL
- Sport: Ice hockey
- Duration: Regular Season; 20 September - 30 March; Postseason; 3 April - 25 May
- Games: 569
- Teams: 21
- Total attendance: 732,585

Regular season
- Season champions: Penticton Vees

Post-season
- Coastal champions: Chilliwack Chiefs
- Coastal runners-up: Victoria Grizzlies
- Interior champions: Brooks Bandits
- Interior runners-up: Penticton Vees
- Finals champions: Brooks Bandits
- Runners-up: Chilliwack Chiefs

BCHL seasons
- ← 2023–24 2025–26 →

The 2024–25 BCHL season was the 63rd season of the British Columbia Hockey League (BCHL) and its second season as an independent league.

The Merritt Centennials folded its BCHL operations and joined the KIJHL as an expansion team.

The Vancouver Island Junior Hockey League (VIJHL) announced that it would withdraw from the Hockey Canada framework and operate as an independent farm league for the BCHL.

The league introduced "universal affiliate" players. Teams will be allowed to supplement their rosters with affiliate players from the VIJHL and the Junior Prospects Hockey League (JPHL).

The league granted "exceptional player status" to Eli McKamey, a 15-year-old forward, allowing him to join the Penticton Vees' roster before the age of 16. He was the first player to receive that designation from the BCHL. In May 2025, McKamey was drafted by the Victoria Royals of the WHL.

The league's 21 teams will be organized into two conferences — Coastal and Interior — with each conference divided into West and East divisions. The five Alberta-based teams, which left the AJHL part-way through the 2023–24 season, will play in the East division of the Interior conference, as will the Cranbrook Bucks. The Prince George Spruce Kings, who had been in the Interior Conference, has been moved into the Coastal Conference's East division.

The teams will play a 54-game regular season with top 8 teams from each conference advancing to the playoffs. In the first round of the playoffs, the first seed in each conference will play the eighth seed, the second seed will play the seventh seed, the third seed will play the sixth seed, and the fourth seed will play the fifth seed. Each round will be a best-of-seven series with the winner advancing to the next round.

Conference	Division	Team	Home	Arena
Coastal	West	Alberni Valley Bulldogs	Port Alberni	Weyerhaeuser Arena
Coastal	West	Cowichan Valley Capitals	North Cowichan	Cowichan Community Centre
Coastal	West	Nanaimo Clippers	Nanaimo	Frank Crane Arena
Coastal	West	Powell River Kings	Powell River	Hap Parker Arena
Coastal	West	Victoria Grizzlies	Victoria	The Q Centre
Coastal	East	Chilliwack Chiefs	Chilliwack	Chilliwack Coliseum
Coastal	East	Coquitlam Express	Coquitlam	Poirier Sport & Leisure Complex
Coastal	East	Langley Rivermen	Langley	George Preston Recreation Centre
Coastal	East	Prince George Spruce Kings	Prince George	Kopar Memorial Arena
Coastal	East	Surrey Eagles	Surrey	South Surrey Arena
Interior	West	Penticton Vees	Penticton	South Okanagan Events Centre
Interior	West	Salmon Arm Silverbacks	Salmon Arm	Shaw Centre
Interior	West	Trail Smoke Eaters	Trail	Cominco Arena
Interior	West	Vernon Vipers	Vernon	Kal Tire Place
Interior	West	West Kelowna Warriors	West Kelowna	Royal LePage Place
Interior	East	Blackfalds Bulldogs	Blackfalds	Eagle Builders Centre
Interior	East	Brooks Bandits	Brooks	Centennial Regional Arena
Interior	East	Cranbrook Bucks	Cranbrook	Western Financial Place
Interior	East	Okotoks Oilers	Okotoks	Okotoks Centennial Arena
Interior	East	Sherwood Park Crusaders	Sherwood Park	Sherwood Park Arena
Interior	East	Spruce Grove Saints	Spruce Grove	Grant Fuhr Arena

Map of BCHL teams
Coastal West Coastal East Interior West Interior East

== 2024 BCHL showcase ==
The annual showcase event will take place from 13 - 17 October 2024 in the Fraser Valley cities of Abbotsford and Chilliwack, co-hosted by the Vancouver Canucks. The event is an opportunity for NCAA coaches and NHL scouts to observe all 21 teams playing two regular season games each. The games will played in the Abbotsford Centre and the Chilliwack Coliseum. The 2024 event will also include a JPHL under-18 showcase.

During the event, the league will also pilot an initiative allowing coaches to lodge a challenge when they believe that a double-minor, major or match penalty should have been assessed. If the challenge is unsuccessful, the challenging team will be assessed a minor penalty for delay of game and will not be permitted another challenge for the rest of the match.

== Standings ==
Note: GP = Games Played, W = Wins, L = Losses, OTL = Overtime Losses, SOL = Shootout losses, Pts = Points

Coastal Conference
TEAM NAMES	GP	W	L	OTL	SOL	Pts
Chilliwack Chiefs	54	37	12	5	0	79
Surrey Eagles	54	31	18	5	0	67
Cowichan Valley Capitals	54	31	19	4	0	66
Victoria Grizzlies	54	28	17	8	1	65
Coquitlam Express	54	28	19	5	2	63
Nanaimo Clippers	54	29	21	4	0	62
Alberni Valley Bulldogs	54	26	24	3	1	56
Prince George Spruce Kings	54	23	25	4	2	52
Langley Rivermen	54	21	23	9	1	52
Powell River Kings	54	9	39	5	1	24
Interior Conference
TEAM NAMES	GP	W	L	OTL	SOL	PTS
Penticton Vees	54	41	8	5	0	87
Brooks Bandits	54	40	10	2	2	84
Trail Smoke Eaters	54	35	15	3	1	74
Salmon Arm Silverbacks	54	32	15	7	0	71
Sherwood Park Crusaders	54	33	20	1	0	67
Cranbrook Bucks	54	30	22	2	0	62
West Kelowna Warriors	54	23	24	5	2	53
Okotoks Oilers	54	21	30	3	0	44
Spruce Grove Saints	54	19	29	6	0	44
Vernon Vipers	54	15	33	6	0	36
Blackfalds Bulldogs	54	15	37	2	0	32

== Post-season ==
The first seed in each conference will play the eighth seed in the first round, the second seed will play the seventh seed and so on. The two last-place teams from the Coastal Conference, and the three last-place teams from the Interior Conference are excluded from the post-season.

First round
Chilliwack	4
Prince George	3
Surrey	1
Alberni Valley	4
Cowichan Valley	4
Nanaimo	1
Victoria	4
Coquitlam	2
Penticton	4
Okotoks	0
Trail	2
Cranbrook	4
Brooks	4
West Kelowna	1
Salmon Arm	0
Sherwood Park	4

Quarter-finals
Chilliwack	4
Alberni Valley	1
Cowichan Valley	2
Victoria	4
Penticton	4
Cranbrook	0
Brooks	4
Sherwood Park	0

Semi-finals
Chilliwack	4
Victoria	1
Penticton	2
Brooks	4

Final
Chilliwack	2
Brooks	4

== Scoring leaders ==
GP = Games Played, G = Goals, A = Assists, PTS = Points, PIM = Penalties In Minutes

Player	Team	GP	GM	A	PTS	PIM
Jeremy Loranger	Sherwood Park Crusaders	54	40	65	105	26
Kale Dach	Sherwood Park Crusaders	54	22	65	87	22
Ryan Schelling	Langley Rivermen	54	29	46	75	60
Mateo Mrsic	Chilliwack Chiefs	53	33	37	70	22
Rasmus Svartstrom	Cranbrook Bucks	54	46	23	69	71
Dylan Kinch	Nanaimo Clippers	52	27	40	67	4
Cole Lonsdale	Nanaimo Clippers	54	27	40	67	18
Nathan Free	Brooks Bandits	54	30	36	66	42
Chase Pirtle	Victoria Grizzlies	54	25	39	64	28
Jason Stefanek	Trail Smoke Eaters	53	32	31	63	18

== Leading goaltenders ==
Note: GP = Games Played, Mins = Minutes Played, W = Wins, L = Losses, OTL = Overtime Losses, GA = Goals Against, SO = Shutouts, Sv% = Save Percentage, GAA = Goals Against Average.

Player	Team	GP	Mins	W	L	OTL	GA	SO	Sv%	GAA
Johnny Hicks	Brooks Bandits	21	1269	18	3	0	29	6	.943	1.37
Will Ingemann	Penticton Vees	34	1954	24	5	4	82	2	.892	2.52
Andrew Ballantyne	Salmon Arm Silverbacks	34	2011	18	11	5	87	3	.909	2.60
Teagan Kendrick	Trail Smoke Eaters	35	2077	23	8	3	93	1	.915	2.69
Ryan Parker	Trail Smoke Eaters	20	1143	12	6	0	53	1	.910	2.78

== See also ==
- 2024 in ice hockey
- 2025 NHL entry draft
- List of BCHL seasons
