= Cowichan Valley Capitals =

Junior ice hockey team

- City: Duncan, British Columbia, Canada
- League: British Columbia Hockey League
- Conference: Coastal
- Founded: 1980
- Home arena: Cowichan Community Centre
- Colours: Red, navy, white
- Owners: Island Capitals Sports & Entertainment
- Website: cowichancapitals.com

Franchise history
- 1980–1984: Cowichan Valley Capitals
- 1984–1986: Sidney Whalers
- 1986–1988: Juan de Fuca Whalers
- 1988–1990: Cowichan Valley Whalers
- 1990–1993: Victoria Warriors
- 1993–present: Cowichan Valley Capitals

The Cowichan Valley Capitals are a junior ice hockey team based in Duncan, British Columbia, Canada. They are members of the Coastal conference in the British Columbia Hockey League (BCHL). They play their home games at Cowichan Community Centre.

== Season-by-season record ==
Note: GP = Games played, W = Wins, L = Losses, T = Ties, OTL = Overtime Losses, Pts = Points, GF = Goals for, GA = Goals against, PIM = Penalties in minutes

Season	GP	W	L	T	OTL	GF	GA	Pts	Finish	Playoffs
1980–81	42	29	13	0	—	329	204	58	3rd, Coastal	Lost div. quarter-finals, 1–5 (Clippers)
1981–82	48	32	16	0	—	347	244	64	3rd, Coastal	Lost Div. Finals, 3–4 (Royals)
1982–83	56	17	38	1	—	247	350	35	7th, Coastal	did not qualify
1983–84	50	8	41	1	—	208	347	17	6th, Coastal	did not qualify
1984–85	52	9	42	1	—	222	438	19	6th, Coastal	did not qualify
1985–86	52	13	38	1	—	216	312	27	5th, Coastal	did not qualify
1986–87	52	20	32	0	—	238	276	40	5th, Coastal	did not qualify
1987–88	52	25	25	2	—	248	241	52	4th, Coastal	Lost div. semi-finals, 2–4 (Sockeyes)
1988–89	60	14	44	2	—	286	420	30	6th, Coastal	did not qualify
1989–90	61	16	44	1	—	308	468	33	6th, Coastal	Lost preliminary, 3–4
1990–91	60	25	34	1	—	263	308	51	4th, Coastal	Lost semifinals, 3–4 (Paper Kings)
1991–92	60	25	34	1	—	303	363	51	4th, Coastal	Lost quarterfinals, 0–4 (Ice Hawks)
1992–93	60	17	37	6	—	259	387	40	5th, Coastal	did not qualify
1993–94	60	29	29	2	—	287	301	60	2nd, Coastal	Lost finals, 1–4 (Spartans)
1994–95	60	32	24	4	—	351	270	68	2nd, Island	Lost quarterfinals, 1–4 (Paper Kings)
1995–96	60	36	22	2	—	272	255	74	1st, Island	Lost semifinals, 0–4 (Vipers)
1996–97	60	32	24	4	—	230	196	68	4th, Coastal	Lost preliminary, 1–2 (Chiefs)
1997–98	60	19	37	4	—	212	261	42	7th, Coastal	did not qualify
1998–99	60	36	20	—	4	290	256	76	2nd, Coastal	Lost Conf. Quarterfinals, 0–3 (Chiefs)
1999–00	60	32	21	—	7	263	243	71	2nd, Coastal	Lost Conf. Quarterfinals, 0–4 (Chiefs)
2000–01	60	28	24	—	8	236	249	64	3rd, Island	did not qualify
2001–02	60	39	16	—	5	291	171	83	2nd, Island	Lost Conference Semifinals, 1–3 (Clippers)
2002–03	60	30	21	2	7	234	207	69	3rd, Island	Lost Conf. Quarterfinals, 1–4 (Kings)
2003–04	60	38	13	4	5	242	183	85	1st, Island	Lost Conf. Quarterfinals, 2–4 (Bulldogs)
2004–05	60	26	29	1	4	213	235	57	4th, Island	Lost Conference Quarterfinals, 0–4 (Clippers)
2005–06	60	25	28	2	5	188	212	57	3rd, Island	Lost Conf. Quarterfinals, 0–4 (Bulldogs)
2006–07	60	36	16	2	6	254	209	80	3rd, Coastal	Lost Conf. Final, 2–4 (Clippers)
2007–08	60	27	28	2	3	200	200	59	7th, Coastal	did not qualify
2008–09	60	34	20	1	5	224	198	74	2nd, Island	Lost Conf. Semifinals, 3–4 (Grizzlies)
2009–10	60	25	32	0	3	181	243	53	7th, Coastal	Lost Conf. Quarterfinals, 1–4 (Kings)
2010–11	60	21	30	1	8	187	253	51	8th, Coastal	did not qualify
2011–12	60	36	16	1	7	222	188	80	3rd, Coastal	Lost Conf. Quarterfinals 3–4 (Eagles)
2012–13	56	13	35	1	7	144	213	34	5th, Island	did not qualify
2013–14	58	22	30	2	4	165	201	50	5th, Island	did not qualify
2014–15	58	20	33	2	3	175	238	45	5th, Island	did not qualify
2015–16	58	27	35	3	3	185	200	60	3rd, Island	Lost div quarter-finals 2–4 (Kings)
2016–17	58	25	28	3	2	168	206	55	3rd of 5, Island; 12th of 17, BCHL	Lost div quarter-finals 0–4 (Kings)
2017–18	58	10	41	5	2	145	267	27	5th of 5, Island; 17th of 17, BCHL	did not qualify
2018–19	58	17	35	—	6	159	220	40	5th of 5, Island; 16th of 17, BCHL	Won First Round, 4–2 (Vees); Lost Second Round, 2–4 (Wild)
2019–20	58	35	16	0	7	194	159	77	2nd of 5, Island; 5th of 17, BCHL	Won First Round, 4–1 (Kings)
2020–21	20	7	11	2	0	44	77	16	4th of 4, Port Al Pod; 11th of 16, BCHL	Covid-19 "pod season" - no playoffs
2021–22	54	15	33	5	1	157	219	36	8th of 9, Coastal; 16th of 18, BCHL	Lost div quarter-final, 0-4 (Bulldogs)
2022–23	54	31	19	0	3	198	164	66	3rd of 9, Coastal; 5th of 18, BCHL	Won 1st round, 4-0 (Grizzlies); Won 2nd round, 4-3 (Eagles); Won semi-finals, 4-0 (Chiefs); Lost finals, 4-0 (Vees)
2023–24	54	33	20	0	1	203	161	67	3rd of 9, Coastal; 7th of 17, BCHL	Won 1st round, 4-3 (Express); Won 2nd round, 4-0 (Chiefs)
2024–25	54	31	19	4	0	220	206	66	3rd of 10, Coastal; 8th of 21, BCHL	Won Div Quarterfinals, 4-1 (Clippers); Lost Div Semifinals 2-4 (Grizzlies)
2025–26	54	38	13	0	3	242	159	79	2nd of 5, Coastal West; 3rd of 10, Coastal; 8th of 21, BCHL	Won Div Quarterfinals, 4-3 (Victoria); Lost Div Semifinals, 3-4 (Nanaimo)

== Honored members ==
The Capitals have only one number retired:

10. Matt Ellison

== NHL alumni ==
- Laurent Brossoit
- Geoff Courtnall
- Matt Ellison
- Dean Evason
- Dan Hodgson
- Geoff Kinrade

== Awards and trophies ==
Cliff McNabb Memorial Trophy
Coastal Conference Champions

- 1994

Chevrolet Cup
Regular Season Champions

- 2004

Bob Fenton Trophy
Most Sportsmanlike Player

- Mike Hammond: 2010
- Alexandre Gagne: 2005
- Mike McKay: 2000

Brett Hull Trophy
Top Scorer

- Matt Ellison: 2002

Bruce Allison Memorial Trophy
Rookie of the Year

- Kevin Robertson: 1988

Defensive Award

- Zack Currie: 2009
- Jim Gattolliat: 1997

Goaltending Award

- Tim Boron: 2003
- Tim Boron: 2002

Joe Tennant Memorial Trophy
Coach of the Year

- Scott Robinson: 2007
- Scott Robinson: 2004

Vern Dye Memorial Trophy
Most Valuable Player

- Chris Rawlings: 2009
- Kevin Lachance: 2004
- Tim Boron: 2003
- Jordan Watt: 2000

Wally Forslund Memorial Trophy
Best Goaltending Duo

- Tim Boron/Jason Dupis: 2002

== See also ==
- List of ice hockey teams in British Columbia
