= 2026–27 BCHL season =

65th year of the BCHL

- League: BCHL
- Sport: Junior ice hockey
- Duration: Regular Season; September–March; Post-season; March–May
- Games: 540
- Teams: 20

List of seasons
- ← 2025–26 2027–28 →

The 2026–27 season is the 65th of the British Columbia Hockey League (BCHL) and its fourth as an independent league. Each team plays 54 regular season games and the top four teams in each division advance to the playoffs.

The league approved the sale of a majority stake in the Nanaimo Clippers to businessman Roman Tkachenko, and a minority stake to former NHL defenceman Oleg Tverdovsky.

The league reduced the roster maximum from 25 to 23 players, plus an optional slot for a third goalie, to create opportunities for players from affliliated leagues to be called up.

The league entered into a management agreement with the Vancouver Island Junior Hockey League (VIJHL), pursuant to which the BCHL will oversee VIJHL operations at the direction of the VIJHL Board of Directors.

== Sources ==
- Dheensaw, Cleve (13 March 2026). "Struggling Powell River BCHL franchise seeks new ownership". Times Colonist. Lodestar Media.
- Bailey, Jim (2 April 2026). "BCHL sees possible affiliation with new WIJHL". Castlegar News.
- "Powell River Kings to play next season". The Peak. Lodestar Media. 9 April 2026.
- "2026 Annual General Meeting Recap". British Columbia Hockey League. 3 June 2026.
- "Powell River Kings add experienced executives". The Peak. Lodestar Media. 18 June 2026.
- "BCHL announces 2026–27 regular season schedule". British Columbia Hockey League. 7 July 2026.
- Trozzo, Tony (8 August 2026). "BCHL to oversee Island hockey league under renewed deal". Abbotsford News.
- Dheensaw, Cleve (14 August 2026). "Grizzlies to host BCHL all-star game with Canada versus World format to continue". Times Colonist. Lodestar Media.
- "BCHL Board of Governors approve majority sale of Nanaimo Clippers franchise". British Columbia Hockey League. 28 August 2026.
