= Alberni Valley Bulldogs =

Junior ice hockey team

- City: Port Alberni, British Columbia
- League: British Columbia Hockey League
- Conference: Coastal
- Founded: 1998
- Home arena: Weyerhaeuser Arena
- Colours: Red, black, grey, white
- Owners: Olithan Sports & Entertainment Ltd
- General manager: Joe Martin
- Head coach: Joe Martin
- Website: albernivalleybulldogs.ca

Franchise history
- 1998–2002: Burnaby Bulldogs
- 2002–present: Alberni Valley Bulldogs

Championships
- Conference titles: 4

The Alberni Valley Bulldogs are a junior ice hockey team based in Port Alberni, British Columbia, Canada. They are members of the Coastal West Division of the British Columbia Hockey League (BCHL). They play their home games at Weyerhaeuser Arena.

== History ==
The Bulldogs were founded as an expansion team in the BCHL based in Burnaby in 1998 and moved to Port Alberni in 2002. The team was sold to the Port Alberni Junior Hockey Society in 2012, and to Keycorp Sports & Entertainment Ltd in 2019. The team was sold to Olithan Sports & Entertainment in 2024.

== Season-by-season record ==
Burnaby Bulldogs
Season	GP	W	L	T	OTL	GF	GA	Pts	Finish	Playoffs
1998–99	60	15	43	—	2	214	347	32	4th, Mainland	did not qualify
1999–00	60	27	25	—	8	234	248	62	3rd, Mainland	Lost conference quarterfinals, 1–4 (Hornets)
2000–01	60	37	19	—	4	287	216	78	1st, Mainland	Lost conference finals, 3–4 (Salsa)
2001–02	60	25	30	—	5	278	304	55	3rd, Mainland	Lost conference quarterfinals, 1–4 (Eagles)

Source: "Burnaby Bulldogs hockey team statistics and history". hockeydb.com.

Alberni Valley Bulldogs
Season	GP	W	L	T	OTL	SOL	GF	GA	Pts	Finish	Playoffs
2002–03	60	27	31	1	1	—	242	261	56	4th, Island	Lost conference quarterfinals, 2–4 (Clippers)
2003–04	60	27	29	0	4	—	215	246	58	4th, Island	Lost conference semifinals, 1–3 (Eagles)
2004–05	60	32	21	1	6	—	207	182	71	2nd, Island	Lost conference semifinals, 0–4 (Clippers)
2005–06	60	43	12	2	3	—	219	141	91	2nd, Island	Lost conference semifinals, 2–4 (Salsa)
2006–07	60	21	32	1	6	—	209	255	49	7th, Coastal	Lost conference quarterfinals, 1–4 (Grizzlies)
2007–08	60	17	39	1	3	—	171	259	38	8th, Coastal	did not qualify
2008–09	60	16	36	1	7	—	156	240	40	4th, Island	did not qualify
2009–10	60	45	12	1	2	—	233	145	93	1st, Coastal	Lost conference finals, 3–4 (Kings)
2010–11	60	24	29	4	3	—	176	197	55	6th, Coastal	Lost division quarterfinals, 0–4 (Chiefs)
2011–12	60	22	34	2	2	—	202	232	48	6th, Coastal; 12th, BCHL	did not qualify
2012–13	56	29	20	2	5	—	202	192	65	3rd, Island; 8th, BCHL	Lost Island/Mainland finals, 0–4 (Eagles)
2013–14	58	21	28	2	7	—	169	206	60	4th of 5, Island; 13th of 16, BCHL	Lost division semifinals, 3–4 (Grizzlies)
2014–15	58	27	25	4	2	—	200	196	51	4th of 5, Island; 12th of 16, BCHL	Lost division semifinals, 3–4 (Clippers)
2015–16	58	23	27	4	4	—	174	200	54	4th of 5, Island; 10th of 17, BCHL	Lost division semifinals, 1–4 (Clippers)
2016–17	58	16	32	3	7	—	134	209	42	5th of 5, Island; 15th of 17, BCHL	did not qualify
2017–18	58	17	32	4	5	—	154	230	43	4th of 5, Island; 15th of 17, BCHL	Lost division semifinals, 3–4 (Grizzlies)
2018–19	58	21	34	—	3	0	156	199	45	4th of 5, Island; 15th of 17, BCHL	Lost first round, 0–4 (Grizzlies)
2019–20	58	26	28	—	2	2	186	214	56	4th of 5, Island; 12th of 17, BCHL	Lost first round, 0–4 (Clippers)
2020–21	20	11	5	—	3	1	82	64	26	2nd of 4, Port Alberni Pod; 8th of 16, BCHL	Covid-19 season–no playoffs
2021–22	54	35	15	—	3	1	195	148	74	1st of 9, Coastal; 4th of 18, BCHL	Won Div. Quarterfinal, 4–0 (Capitals); Lost division semifinal, 2–4 (Rivermen)
2022–23	54	31	19	—	3	1	198	164	66	3rd of 9, Coastal; 5th of 18, BCHL	Won division quarterfinal, 4–0 (Grizzlies); Won division semifinal, 4–3 (Eagles); Won conference finals, 4–0 (Chiefs); Lost Fred Page Cup finals, 0–4 (Vees)
2023–24	54	33	20	—	1	0	203	161	67	3rd of 9, Coastal; 7th of 17, BCHL	Won first round, 4-3 (Express); Won second round, 4-0 (Chiefs); Lost semifinals, 4-3 (Eagles)
2024–25	54	26	24	—	3	1	181	190	56	7th of 10, Coastal; 13th of 21, BCHL	Won division quarterfinals, 4-1 (Eagles); Lost division semifinals, 1–4 (Chiefs)
2025–26	54	26	25	—	3	0	199	177	55	3rd of 5, Coastal West; 7th of 10, Coastal; 13th of 20, BCHL	Lost first round, 1-4 (Clippers)

Source: "Alberni Valley Bulldogs hockey team statistics and history". hockeydb.com.

== Alumni ==
Bulldogs alumni include the team's former head coach Jim Hiller, who became head coach of the Los Angeles Kings in 2024. Casey Bailey and Harry Zolnierczyk each played two seasons with the team. David Dziurzynski played one season with the team. Andrew Hammond played one game with the team.

== See also ==
- British Columbia Hockey League
- List of ice hockey teams in British Columbia
- Port Alberni Bombers
