= 2023–24 BCHL season =

- League: BCHL
- Sport: Hockey
- Duration: Regular season 22 September – 31 March; Postseason; 5 April – 26 May; Rocky Mountain Challenge; 31 May - 1 June
- Games: 54
- Teams: 17 (BC); 5 (AB)

Regular season
- Season champions: Surrey Eagles (BC); Brooks Bandits (AB)

Post-season
- BC champions: Surrey Eagles
- BC runners-up: Penticton Vees
- AB champions: Brooks Bandits
- AB runners-up: Sherwood Park Crusaders

Rocky Mountain Challenge
- Champions: Brooks Bandits
- Runners-up: Surrey Eagles

BCHL seasons
- ← 2022–23 2024–25 →

The 2023–24 BCHL season was the 62nd season of the British Columbia Hockey League (BCHL). The 17 teams from the Coastal and Interior Divisions played 54 scheduled games, including two games as part of the BCHL showcase, which were held in Seattle from October 22 to October 26 2023, in partnership with the NHL's Seattle Kraken. The 5 teams in the stand-alone Alberta Division, which was created mid-season, played between 65 and 69 season games.

== League changes ==
The 2023–24 season was the BCHL's first season as an independent league, following its departure from Hockey Canada.

In an effort to limit the number of games decided by shootout, overtime was lengthened from five minutes to ten minutes. Games would still be decided by shootout if they remained tied after one period of 3-on-3 sudden victory overtime.

Team rosters were required to have a minimum of three players under the age of 18. Previously, they required one player under the age of 18.

Russian and Belarusian players were barred from the league.

The Wenatchee Wild folded after its owners acquired the Western Hockey League's (WHL) Winnipeg Ice and moved it to Wenatchee.

On January 20, 2024, the league announced that five teams from the Alberta Junior Hockey League would join the BCHL in the 2024–25 season, namely, the Blackfalds Bulldogs, Brooks Bandits, Okotoks Oilers, Sherwood Park Crusaders, and Spruce Grove Saints. The league had planned to wait until the end of the season to make the announcement; however, rumours had already begun to circulate.

The AJHL responded to the announcement by cancelling most of the five teams' remaining scheduled matches except those between each other. It was then decided that the five Alberta-based teams would play out the rest of the 2023–24 season as a stand-alone division under the aegis of the BCHL.

For the post-season, the Okotoks Oilers and Spruce Grove Saints, respectively the 4th and 5th placed teams in the Alberta division, played a best-of-5 wildcard series, with the winner advancing to the Alberta division semi-finals along with the top-3 Alberta teams. The rankings for the Alberta division were determined by winning percentage including their regular season records from the AJHL. The semi-final and final rounds each consisted of a best-of-7 series. The Brooks Bandits defeated the Sherwood Park Crusaders in the final round 4 games to 1.

The Surrey Eagles won the BCHL Fred Page Cup championship after defeating the Penticton Vees in 6 games. The Eagles and Brooks Bandits then met for a best-of-3 competition hosted by Brooks and branded as the Rocky Mountain Challenge. The Bandits swept the Eagles in 2 games.

== Standings ==
Note: GP = Games Played, W = Wins, L = Losses, OTL = Overtime Losses, SOL = Shootout losses, Pts = Points

=== British Columbia ===
Coastal Division
TEAM NAMES	GP	W	L	OTL	SOL	Pts
Surrey Eagles	54	48	8	2	0	90
Chilliwack Chiefs	54	32	17	4	1	69
Alberni Valley Bulldogs	54	33	20	1	0	67
Victoria Grizzlies	54	29	22	1	2	61
Nanaimo Clippers	54	27	23	3	1	58
Coquitlam Express	54	21	29	1	3	46
Langley Rivermen	54	19	28	7	0	45
Cowichan Valley Capitals	54	16	34	3	1	36
Powell River Kings	54	14	35	5	0	33

Interior Division
TEAM NAMES	GP	W	L	OTL	SOL	Pts
Penticton Vees	54	38	10	3	3	82
West Kelowna Warriors	54	33	10	11	0	77
Salmon Arm Silverbacks	54	34	17	0	3	71
Vernon Vipers	54	33	19	20	0	68
Trail Smoke Eaters	54	28	20	6	0	62
Merritt Centennials	54	22	26	5	1	50
Cranbrook Bucks	54	20	31	3	0	43
Prince George Spruce Kings	54	16	35	3	0	35

=== Alberta ===
Alberta Division
TEAM NAMES	GP	W	L	OTL	SOL	Pts
Brooks Bandits	65	58	6	1	0	117
Sherwood Park Crusaders	67	49	16	2	0	100
Blackfalds Bulldogs	68	39	22	6	1	85
Okotoks Oilers	69	38	28	3	0	79
Spruce Grove Saints	66	26	34	5	1	58

Alberta team standings are displayed separately from the rest of the BCHL on the league website.

== Post-season ==
=== 2024 BCHL Fred Page Cup playoffs ===
First round
Surrey	4
Cowichan Valley	1
Victoria	4
Nanaimo	1
Chilliwack	4
Langley	0
Alberni Valley	4
Coquitlam	3
Penticton	4
Prince George	0
Vernon	4
Trail	1
West Kelowna	4
Cranbrook	3
Salmon Arm	4
Merritt	2

Quarter-finals
Surrey	4
Victoria	2
Chilliwack	0
Alberni Valley	4
Penticton	4
Vernon	1
West Kelowna	1
Salmon Arm	4

Semi-finals
Surrey	4
Alberni Valley	3
Penticton	4
Salmon Arm	3

Fred Page Cup Final
Surrey	4
Penticton	2

=== Alberta Division ===
Wildcard (Bo5)
Okotoks	3
Spruce Grove	0

Semifinals (Bo7)
Brooks	4
Okotoks	3
Sherwood Park	4
Blackfalds	0

Final (Bo7)
Brooks	4
Sherwood Park	1

=== Rocky Mountain Challenge ===
Best of 3
Brooks	2
Surrey	0

== Scoring leaders ==
GP = Games Played, G = Goals, A = Assists, P = Points, PIM = Penalties In Minutes

Player	Team	GP	G	A	Pts	PIM
Caden Cranston	Surrey Eagles	51	30	56	86	16
Aaron Schwartz	Surrey Eagles	51	34	47	81	10
Felix Caron	West Kelowna Warriors	54	31	38	69	54
Mike Murtagh	Nanaimo Clippers	53	27	36	63	51
Nicholas Beneteau	Alberni Valley Bulldogs	54	17	46	63	36
Michael Felsing	Merritt Centennials	53	16	42	58	32
Hayden Stavroff	Alberni Valley Bulldogs	46	35	20	55	82
Luke Buss	Nanaimo Clippers	52	29	26	55	20
Anthony Yu	Powell River Kings	53	18	37	55	16
Callum Arnott	Penticton Vees	53	18	37	53	8

== Leading goaltenders ==
Note: GP = Games Played, Mins = Minutes Played, W = Wins, L = Losses, OTL = Overtime Losses, GA = Goals Against, SO = Shutouts, Sv% = Save Percentage, GAA = Goals Against Average.

Player	Team	GP	Mins	W	L	OTL	GA	SO	Sv%	GAA
Will Ingemann	Penticton Vees	32	1817	22	6	1	56	6	.919	1.85
Ajeet Gundarah	Surrey Eagles	33	1904	25	6	1	68	2	.931	2.14
Andrew Ness	Penticton Vees	25	1419	16	3	2	52	2	.915	'2.20
Eli Pulver	Salmon Arm Silverbacks	38	2320	23	13	0	89	3	.915	2.20
Rorke Applebee	West Kelowna Warriors	41	2396	24	6	8	105	3	.902	2.30

== Award winners ==
- Brett Hull Trophy (Top Scorer): Caden Cranston (Surrey Eagles)
- Campbell Blair Trophy (Top Defencemen): Isaiah Norlin (West Kelowna Warriors)
- Bruce Allison Memorial Trophy (Rookie of the Year): Chase Pirtle (Victoria Grizzlies)
- Bob Fenton Trophy (Most Sportsmanlike): Josh Nadeau (Penticton Vees)
- Michael Garteig Trophy (Top Goaltender): Ajeet Gundarah (Surrey Eagles)
- Wally Forslund Memorial Trophy (Best Goaltending Duo): Will Ingemann & Andrew Ness (Penticton Vees)
- Vern Dye Memorial Trophy (regular-season MVP): Caden Cranston (Surrey Eagles)
- Jeff Tambellini Trophy (Playoff MVP): Micah Berger (Surrey Eagles)
- Joe Tennant Memorial Trophy (Coach of the Year): Cam Keith (Surrey Eagles)
- Ron Boileau Memorial Trophy (Best Regular Season Record): Surrey Eagles
- Cliff McNabb Memorial Trophy (Coastal Conference champions): Surrey Eagles
- Ryan Hatfield Trophy (Interior Conference champions): Penticton Vees
- Fred Page Cup (League Champions): Surrey Eagles
- Alberta Division Champions: Brooks Bandits
- Rocky Mountain Challenge Champions: Brooks Bandits
- Jim Hughson Award (Broadcaster of the Year): Dan Marshall (Nanaimo Clippers)

== See also ==
- 2023 in ice hockey
- 2024 in ice hockey
