= Nanaimo Civic Arena =

Indoor arena in Nanaimo, British Columbia

The Nanaimo Civic Arena was an indoor arena located in Nanaimo, British Columbia. It was built in 1939 and hosted the British Columbia Hockey League's Nanaimo Clippers, The Nanaimo Timbermen, among many other teams. The arena officially closed on September 9, 2006 and was torn down in November to make way for a proposed twin condominium tower complex. The new home of the Clippers is the modern Frank Crane Arena.
