= List of BCHL seasons =

League history
OMJHL	1961–1963
OJHL	1963–1967
BCJHL	1967–1995
BCHL	Since 1995

This is a list of British Columbia Hockey League (BCHL) seasons since the league's inception in 1961.

The league was founded as the Okanagan-Mainland Junior Hockey League (OMJHL) in 1961 by the owners of four regional Junior "B" teams. It later expanded into the Lower Mainland and Vancouver Island and was renamed the British Columbia Junior Hockey League in 1967. It was renamed the British Columbia Hockey League (BCHL) in 1995. The 2023–24 season was the BCHL's first season as an independent league, following its departure from Hockey Canada.

== Okanagan-Mainland Junior Hockey League ==
- 1961-62
- 1962-63

== Okanagan Junior Hockey League ==
- 1963-64
- 1964-65
- 1965-66
- 1966-67

== British Columbia Junior Hockey League ==
- 1967-68
- 1968-69
- 1969-70
- 1970-71
- 1971-72
- 1972-73
- 1973-74
- 1974-75
- 1975-76
- 1976-77
- 1977-78
- 1978-79
- 1979-80
- 1980-81
- 1981-82
- 1982-83
- 1983-84
- 1984-85
- 1985-86
- 1986-87
- 1987-88
- 1988-89
- 1989-90
- 1990-91
- 1991-92
- 1992-93
- 1993-94
- 1994-95

== British Columbia Hockey League ==
- 1995–96
- 1996–97
- 1997–98
- 1998–99
- 1999–00
- 2000–01
- 2001–02
- 2002–03
- 2003–04
- 2004–05
- 2005–06
- 2006–07
- 2007–08
- 2008–09
- 2009–10
- 2010–11
- 2011–12
- 2012–13
- 2013–14
- 2014–15
- 2015–16
- 2016–17
- 2017–18
- 2018–19
- 2019–20
- 2020–21
- 2021–22
- 2022–23
- 2023–24
- 2024–25
- 2025–26
- 2026–27

== See also ==
- British Columbia Hockey League
- Hockey Canada
- Junior ice hockey
- Vancouver Island Junior Hockey League
- Western International Junior Hockey League
