= Victoria Grizzlies =

- City: Victoria, British Columbia, Canada
- League: British Columbia Hockey League
- Conference: Coastal
- Founded: 1994
- Home arena: The Q Centre
- Colours: Gold, black, white
- General manager: Geoff Grimwood
- Head coach: Geoff Grimwood
- Website: www.victoriagrizzlies.com

Franchise history
- 1994–2006: Victoria Salsa
- 2006–present: Victoria Grizzlies

The Victoria Grizzlies are a junior ice hockey team based in Victoria, British Columbia, Canada. They are members of the Coastal West Division of the British Columbia Hockey League (BCHL). They play their home games at The Q Centre. The franchise was founded in 1994 as the Victoria Salsa.

== History ==
The Victoria Cougars were created as a Junior A team, playing out of Victoria, British Columbia, which joined the British Columbia Junior Hockey League (BCJHL) as an expansion team for the start of the 1967–68 season. This brought the league to a total of six teams. After a 1971 realignment of junior hockey into "Major Junior" and "Tier II Junior A", the Cougars joined the Western Canadian Hockey League (WCHL), now the Western Hockey League. In 1994 the Cougars relocated to Prince George, British Columbia.

In 1990, the BCHL's Cowichan Valley Capitals relocated to Victoria from Duncan, British Columbia and became the Victoria Warriors. The Warriors returned to Duncan in 1993 and became the Cowichan Valley Capitals again, so in 1994 the Victoria Salsa joined the BCHL as an expansion team.

Victoria Salsa Logo

At the start of the 2006–07 season, the team was renamed as the Victoria Grizzlies under the ownership of Len Barrie who was building Bear Mountain Resort at the time (hence the name Grizzlies). The Grizzlies hosted and played in the 2009 Royal Bank Cup, won by the Vernon Vipers. In the 2013–14 season they won the Island Division championship after beating Powell River 4–2 in game six.

In 2011 Ron Walchuk purchased the team and remained as the owner for almost 15 years. Most notably the team fell in a Conference Final in 2016-17 to the Chilliwack Chiefs and then again in the Conference Final to the Prince George Spruce Kings in 2018-19 with Alex Newhook as the team captain.

During the summer of 2024, the team was purchased by local businessman; Jim Hartshorne. Hartshorne also owns the Victoria Shamrocks of the WLA making for the combination of both franchises playing out of The Q Centre under the umbrella of "Keycorp Sports & Entertainment". That company was named for Hartshorne's Development company (Keycorp Developments).

The team found success right away under new ownership and presidency of David Michaud, finishing fourth in the Coastal Conference with a record of 28-17-9. They defeated the Coquitlam Express in the first round in just six games before finishing their Island Rival Cowichan Valley Capitals in the second round in six games as well. They would, however, fall in the Conference Final in five games to the Chilliwack Chiefs.

== Season-by-season record ==
Note: GP = Games Played, W = Wins, L = Losses, T = Ties, OTL = Overtime Losses, GF = Goals for, GA = Goals against, Pts = Points

Season	GP	W	L	T	OTL	GF	GA	Pts	Finish	Playoffs
1994–95	60	21	35	4	—	263	338	46	4th, Coastal	did not qualify
1995–96	60	12	43	5	—	219	314	29	4th, Coastal	did not qualify
1996–97	60	24	35	1	—	213	273	49	6th, Coastal	did not qualify
1997–98	60	31	24	5	—	188	209	67	3rd, Coastal	Lost Quarterfinals, 3–4 (Chiefs)
1998–99	60	35	22	—	3	282	234	73	3rd, Coastal	Lost Div. Semifinals, 2–3 (Chiefs)
1999–00	60	36	20	—	4	282	223	76	4th, Coastal	Lost Conf. Quarterfinals, 2–4 (Clippers)
2000–01	60	29	23	—	8	225	205	66	2nd, Coastal	Fred Page Cup Champions, 4–3 (Centennials)
2001–02	60	33	26	—	1	231	220	67	3rd, Coastal	Lost Preliminary, 1–4 (Capitals)
2002–03	60	23	31	1	5	234	281	52	5th, Coastal	did not qualify
2003–04	60	25	29	3	3	217	235	56	5th, Island	Lost Preliminary, 1–4 (Eagles)
2004–05	60	16	39	0	5	176	255	37	5th, Island	Lost Preliminary, 1–4 (Eagles)
2005–06	60	22	25	2	9	190	200	57	4th, Island	Lost Semifinals, 1–4 (Express)
2006–07	60	39	17	3	1	263	211	82	2nd, Coastal	Lost Quarterfinals, 2–4 (Capitals)
2007–08	60	30	22	3	5	204	189	68	5th, Coastal	Lost Quarterfinals, 2–4 (Chiefs)
2008–09	60	43	13	1	3	237	159	90	1st, Island	Lost Division Finals, 3–4 (Kings)
2009–10	60	34	18	2	6	220	175	76	3rd, Coastal	Lost Div. Quarterfinals, 2–4 (Clippers)
2010–11	60	33	24	0	3	218	197	69	4th, Coastal	Lost Division Semifinals, 4-3 (Kings)
2011–12	60	21	38	1	0	192	305	43	14th, BCHL	did not qualify
2012–13	56	33	13	0	10	189	162	76	1st, Island	Lost Division Finals, 2–3 (Bulldogs)
2013–14	58	37	15	3	3	212	163	80	1st, Island	Eliminated 0–3 in round-robin
2014–15	58	29	18	1	10	208	205	69	2nd, Island	Lost First Round (Kings)
2015–16	58	24	30	0	4	173	178	52	5th of 5, Island; 11th of 17, BCHL	did not qualify
2016–17	58	37	12	4	5	218	143	83	1st of 5, Island; 4th of 17, BCHL	Won Div. Semifinals, 4–1 (Clippers); Won Div. Finals 4–3 (Kings); Lost League Semi-finals 2–4 (Chiefs)
2017–18	58	32	18	4	4	216	187	72	1st of 5, Island; 5th of 17, BCHL	Won Div. Semifinals, 4–3 (Bulldogs); Lost Div. Finals 1–4 (Kings)
2018–19	58	36	18	—	4	231	188	76	1st of 5, Island; 5th of 17, BCHL	Won First Round, 4–0 (Bulldogs); Won Second Round, 4–3 (Kings); Lost Semifinals, 0–4 (Spruce Kings)
2019–20	58	24	33	0	1	163	219	49	5th of 5, Island; 14th of 17, BCHL	Lost First Round, 0–4 ( Silverbacks)
2020–21	20	14	6	0	0	93	55	28	1st of 4, Alberni Val. Pod; 4th of 16, BCHL	Covid-19 "pod season" - no playoffs
2021–22	54	29	25	0	0	202	174	58	5th of 9, Coastal; 11th of 18, BCHL	Lost Div Quarterfinal, 4-1 (Rivermen)
2022–23	54	26	20	0	5	163	154	60	6th of 9, Coastal; 12th of 18, BCHL	Lost 1st round, 4-0 (Bulldogs)
2023–24	54	29	22	0	1	176	175	61	4th of 9, Coastal; 9th of 17, BCHL	Won 1st round, 4-1 (Clippers); Lost quarter finals, 4-2 (Eagles)
2024–25	54	28	17	0	9	205	191	65	4th of 10, Coastal; 9th of 21, BCHL	Won 1st round 4-2 (Express); Won Quarterfinals 4-2 (Capitals); Lost Semifinals 1-4 (Chiefs)
2025–26	49	23	23	0	3	187	200	49	8th of 10, Coastal; 14th of 20, BCHL	Lost 1st round, 4-3 (Capitals)

== NHL alumni ==
- Jamie Benn
- Jordie Benn
- Kyle Greentree
- Aaron Voros
- Tyler Bozak
- Ryan O'Byrne
- Greg Zanon
- Matt Pettinger
- Jesse Fibiger
- Jordan Sigalet
- Alex Newhook
- Matthew Wood

== Awards and trophies ==
Fred Page Cup

- 2001

Mowat Cup

- 2001

Cliff McNabb Memorial Trophy

- 2001

Chevrolet Cup

- 2009

Brett Hull Trophy

- Matthew Wood: 2022
- Tyler Bozak: 2007
- Kyle Greentree: 2004

Joe Tennant Memorial Trophy

- Campbell Blair: 2000

Bob Fenton Trophy

- Gary Nunn: 2007
- Terry Wilson: 1999

Top Defenceman Trophy

- Jordan Heywood: 2010

Vern Dye Trophy

- Jordan Sigalet: 2001
- Jimi St. John: 1998

Bruce Allison Memorial Trophy

- Jamie Benn: 2007
- Matthew Wood: 2022
- Oliver Auyeung-Ashton: 2023
- Chase Pirtle: 2024

== See also ==
- List of ice hockey teams in British Columbia
