= Langley Rivermen =

- City: Langley, British Columbia, Canada
- League: British Columbia Hockey League
- Division: Mainland
- Founded: 1972
- Home arena: George Preston Recreation Centre
- Colours: Navy blue, White
- General manager: Brad Rihela
- Head coach: Brad Rihela
- Website: langleyrivermen.com

Franchise history
- 1972–1990: Richmond Sockeyes
- 1990–2006: Chilliwack Chiefs
- 2006–2011: Langley Chiefs
- 2011–present: Langley Rivermen

The Langley Rivermen are a junior ice hockey team based in Langley, British Columbia, Canada. They are members of the Coastal East Division of the British Columbia Hockey League (BCHL).

== History ==
The BCHL franchise was founded as the Richmond Sockeyes in 1972 in the Pacific Junior A Hockey League. In 1990, Sockeyes dropped to the junior B level and sold the junior A franchise to become the Chilliwack Chiefs. In 2006, the Chilliwack Bruins of the Western Hockey League were founded and the Chiefs moved to become the Langley Chiefs.

In 2011, the Chiefs changed ownership and became the Langley Rivermen, allowing for the return of the Chiefs to Chilliwack.

== Season-by-season record ==
Note: GP = Games played, W = Wins, L = Losses, T = Ties, OTL = Overtime Losses, GF = Goals for, GA = Goals against, PTS = Points

Season	GP	W	L	T	OTL	GF	GA	PTS	Finish	Playoffs
2006–07	60	29	27	1	3	229	229	62	5th of 8, Coastal; 12th of 17, BCHL	Lost Conf. Quarterfinals, 3–4 (Express)
2007–08	60	33	21	0	6	257	234	72	2nd of 8, Coastal; 6th of 16, BCHL	Won 1st round, 4-2 (Grizzlies); Lost semi-finals, 2–4 (Clippers)
2008–09	60	30	25	2	3	217	211	65	2nd of 4, Mainland; 8th of 16, BCHL	Lost Conf. Quarterfinals, 1–3 (Eagles)
2009–10	60	33	22	2	3	226	209	71	4th of 8, Coastal; 7th of 17, BCHL	Lost 1st round, 0–4 (Kings)
2010–11	60	31	21	1	7	240	217	70	3rd of 8, Coastal; 7th of 16, BCHL	Lost 1st round
2011–12	60	19	35	1	5	174	237	44	7th of 8, Coastal; 13th of 16, BCHL	did not qualify
2012–13	56	24	26	1	5	194	204	54	4th of 5, Coastal; 12th of 16, BCHL	Lost 1st round, 1–3 (Eagles)
2013–14	58	37	13	3	5	200	155	82	1st of 5, Coastal; 2nd of 16, BCHL	Lost 1st round, 2–4 (Express)
2014–15	58	29	23	1	5	204	198	64	2nd of 5, Coastal; 9th of 16, BCHL	Lost 1st round, 2–4 (Spruce Kings)
2015–16	58	31	22	3	2	212	187	67	3rd of 6, Coastal; 7th of 17, BCHL	Lost 1st round, 1–4 (Wild)
2016–17	58	30	20	6	2	240	205	68	3rd of 6, Coastal; 7th of 17, BCHL	Lost 1st round, 2–4 (Chiefs)
2017–18	58	25	20	10	3	168	183	63	2nd of 5, Coastal; 9th of 17, BCHL	Lost 1st round, 2–4 (Eagles)
2018–19	58	27	27	—	4	167	173	58	4th of 5, Coastal; 12th of 17, BCHL	Lost 1st round, 3–4 (Chiefs)
2019–20	58	23	31	1	3	162	204	50	4th of 5, Coastal; 13th of 17, BCHL	Lost 1st round, 0–4 (Express)
2020–21	Due to Covid-19 did not participate in "pod season"									
2021–22	54	33	18	1	2	180	169	69	4th of 9, Coastal; 7th of 18, BCHL	Won 1st round, 4–1 (Grizzlies); Won 2nd round, 4-2 (Bulldogs); Lost semi-finals, 0-4 (Clippers)
2022–23	54	16	33	0	2	137	200	37	8th of 9, Coastal; 16th of 18, BCHL	Lost 1st round, 4-2 (Clippers)
2023–24	54	19	28	0	7	151	190	45	7th of 9, Coastal; 13th of 17, BCHL	Lost 1st round, 4-0 (Chiefs)
2024–25	54	21	23	9	1	185	225	52	9th of 10, Coastal; 16th of 21, BCHL	Did Not Qualify

== Notable alumni ==
- Colton Beck
- Dante Fabbro
- Derek Grant
- Kyle MacKinnon
- Dennis Robertson
- Shawn Horcoff
- Angus Crookshank

== See also ==
- List of ice hockey teams in British Columbia
