= Cranbrook Bucks =

Junior ice hockey club

- City: Cranbrook, British Columbia, Canada
- League: British Columbia Hockey League
- Conference: Interior
- Division: West
- Founded: 2019
- Home arena: Western Financial Place
- Colours: Green Silver
- Owner: Nathan Lieuwen
- Head coach: Roshen Jaswal
- Website: www.cranbrookbucks.ca

The Cranbrook Bucks are a Junior ice hockey team based in Cranbrook, British Columbia, Canada. They are members of the Interior Conference of the British Columbia Hockey League (BCHL). They play their home games at Western Financial Place.

== History ==
On October 8, 2019, the BCHL awarded the city of Cranbrook and an ownership group led by former Kootenay Ice goaltender Nathan Lieuwen an expansion franchise to begin play during the 2020–21 BCHL season.

The franchise was a replacement tenant for Western Financial Place, after the Western Hockey League's Kootenay Ice franchise relocated to Winnipeg, Manitoba prior to the start of the 2019-20 WHL season.

== Season-by-season record ==
Note: GP = Games played, W = Wins, L = Losses, T = Ties, OTL = Overtime Losses, GF = Goals for, GA = Goals against, Pts = Points

Season	GP	W	L	T	OTL	GF	GA	Pts	Finish	Playoffs
2020–21	20	3	16	0	39	81	7	155	3rd of 3, Penticton Pod; 15th of 16, BCHL	Covid-19 "pod season" - no playoffs
2021–22	54	29	20	2	169	160	63	474	5th of 9, Interior; 10th of 18, BCHL	Lost Div Quarterfinal, 2-4 (Spruce Kings)
2022–23	54	36	14	0	1	199	139	76	2nd of 9, Interior; 3rd of 18, BCHL	Lost Div Quarterfinal, 2-4 (Wild)
2023–24	54	20	31	0	3	133	178	43	7th of 8, Interior; 14th of 17, BCHL	Lost Div Quarterfinal, 3-4 (Warriors)
2024–25	54	30	22	2	0	193	182	62	6th of 11, Interior; 11th of 21, BCHL	Won Div Quarterfinal, 4-2 (Smoke Eaters); Lost Div Semifinals 0-4 (Vees)
2025–26	54	20	28	0	5	162	206	46	4th in division 16th overall	Won first round against West Kelowna (4:1); Won quarterfinal against Salmon Arm (4:3); Lost semifinal against Brooks (4:1)

Source: "Cranbrook Bucks hockey team statistics and history". hockeydb.com.
