= Coquitlam Express =

- City: Coquitlam, British Columbia
- League: BCHL
- Division: Coastal
- Founded: 2001
- Home arena: Poirier Sport & Leisure Complex
- Colours: Black, gold, white
- General manager: Tali Campbell
- Head coach: Mark Coletta - Asst (Jim Camazzola & Mike Nesbitt)
- Website: Official Website – Tickets available here

Franchise history
- 2001–2005: Coquitlam Express
- 2005–2010: Burnaby Express
- 2010–present: Coquitlam Express

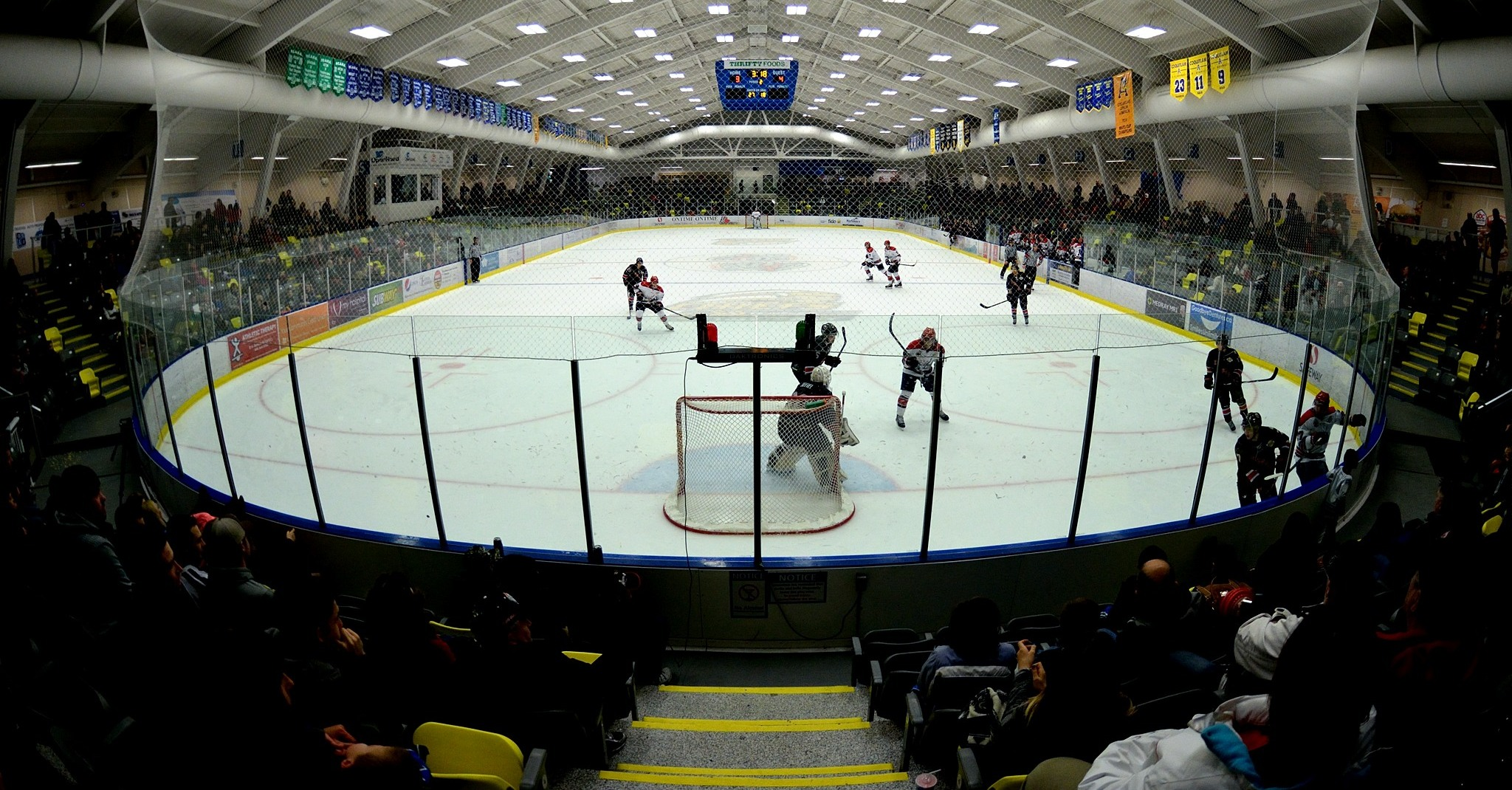
Coquitlam Express hockey at the Poirier Sport & Leisure Complex

The Coquitlam Express are a Junior ice hockey team based in Coquitlam, British Columbia, Canada. They are members of the Coastal Conference of the British Columbia Hockey League (BCHL). They play their home games at the Poirier Sport & Leisure Complex.

Although the team had played in the neighbouring city of Burnaby for the previous five years, on 14 January 2010 it was announced that the BCHL Board of Governors unanimously approved the relocation of the franchise back to Coquitlam for the 2010–11 season.

== History ==
The Coquitlam Express began play as a new franchise in the BCHL for the 2001–02 hockey season, and played in the city for four seasons at the Coquitlam Sports Centre. Due to unsatisfactory conditions at the Sports Centre, specifically a reduction of parking due to the construction of a new aquatic complex next door, the team relocated to Burnaby for the 2005–06 season.

Burnaby originally had a junior "A" team by the name of the Burnaby Bulldogs, which played in that city for four seasons (1998–2001). That team relocated to the city of Port Alberni, on Vancouver Island for the start of the 2002–03 season and was renamed the Alberni Valley Bulldogs.

The 2005–06 season saw the Express win the league championship (Fred Page Cup) and the Mowat Cup by defeating the Langley Hornets in four games, the Chilliwack Chiefs in 5 games, the Victoria Salsa in 5 games, and the Penticton Vees in six games. The team then defeated the Fort McMurray Oil Barons in six games for the Doyle Cup and entered the National Championship as Pacific Region winners.

The Express won the Royal Bank Cup 2006 (National Championship) by defeating the Yorkton Terries by a score of 8–2. In the Semi-Final against the Fort William Northstars, they scored the tying goal with 12 seconds left in the third period then went on to win 3–2 in overtime. During the round-robin they had a record of 3–1, which seeded them 2nd in the Tournament, behind the hometown hosts Streetsville Derbys.

In 2006–07 the Express were highly touted as a top team in the Canadian Junior Hockey League, with players like Kyle Turris and Tyler McNeely. In the first round of the BCHL playoffs, the team beat the Langley Chiefs in seven games before losing to the eventual BCHL league champions Nanaimo Clippers in seven games during the second round.

The 2007 off-season saw a coaching change from Rick Lanz, a scout for the Colorado Avalanche, to Dave McLellan. The team was not very well-supported since the move from Coquitlam and struggled in attendance for the third straight year.

By 17 October 2009, the Burnaby Express were averaging just 548 fans per game, which was the second lowest attendance of the 17 teams in the BCHL at the time. This was half the attendance the team averaged in their final season in Coquitlam (1,091 fans per game). With the team in last place in the Coastal Conference, on 16 January 2010 the Express announced the firing of coach Dave McLellan. General manager Darcy Rota took over during the interim, with Bill Zaharia and Tyler Kuntz named as assistants for the remainder of the 2009–10 season. On 13 April 2010, the Express named Jon Calvano as their next head coach.

The 2010–11 season marked the Express' return to Coquitlam. They played their first game back at the newly renovated and renamed Poirier Sport & Leisure Complex on 24 September 2010, where they defeated the Surrey Eagles 4–2. Coquitlam made the playoffs for the first time in three seasons, losing in the first round to the Eagles in four games. The following year, they would again be eliminated in the first round, this time to the Powell River Kings in six games. Following the 2011–12 season, the Express named Jon Calvano as general manager on top of his existing coaching duties.

The 2012–13 season saw a great start for the Express until the team lost players to multiple injuries within a short period, including New Jersey Devils draftee Alexander Kerfoot. The team struggled for most of the latter half of the season and failed to reach the postseason for the third time in five years. Calvano was fired at the end of the season.

Barry Wolff became the team's next head coach on 22 April 2013 and in the following season led the Express to their second Fred Page Cup championship, and their first and only appearance in the Western Canada Cup, where they finished fourth following a 5–3 loss in the semifinal to the AJHL's Spruce Grove Saints. Wolff was named the 2014 coach of the year by the Coquitlam Sports Hall of Fame and the team earned team of the year honours.

The team achieved mixed success for the next couple of seasons, finishing fourth in the mainland division and eliminated in the first round of the playoffs in two consecutive seasons. The 2016–17 season again had the Express sustain many player injuries, resulting in a franchise worst 11–44–2–1 (25 points) record and finishing last in nearly every statistic. The following season continued the trend and after recording only three wins and eight points in the first half of the season, Wolff was fired and replaced with former OJHL's Toronto Patriots head coach Jason Fortier. The team turned around under Fortier until the 2019–20 season where the Express posted a franchise-best 47–9–1–1 (96 points) and won the Ron Boileau Memorial Trophy for the first time as regular season champions. Their performance over the regular season was enough to earn Fortier Coach of the Year honors for the 2019–20 season. Unfortunately, after winning their first round matchup with the Langley Rivermen, Hockey Canada cancelled the remainder of the Junior A season nationally due to the global COVID-19 pandemic, ending their run for a third league title.

Fortier would leave the team in the off-season, with Dan Cioffi, coach of the BCMML's Valley West Giants, named as his replacement. He, however, would resign after the league's extended pre-season was paused by the Provincial Health Officer. Adam Nugent-Hopkins, older brother of Edmonton Oiler Ryan Nugent-Hopkins, took his place for the rest of the season alongside new GM Tali Campbell. He would coach the team to a 6-11-3 record in a 20-game pod season played against the Surrey Eagles and Powell River Kings.

Brandon Shaw, previously assistant coach of the Alberni Valley Bulldogs, would be named head coach for the team's first full season since the start of the COVID-19 pandemic. After a rough start, he would rally the team to a 22-26-6 record to bring the team back up to 7th in the Coastal Conference. The Express would be eliminated by the Chiefs in the first round but not without taking the series to a full seven games. Shaw would move up to become an assistant coach with the OHL's Niagara Icedogs, leaving the team to find their fourth head coach in three seasons. Not only was it announced that Vees assistant coach Patrick Sexton would become the new bench boss for the 2022–23 season, but on 17 August 2022 it was announced that a newly retired Kyle Turris would be returning to the Express as a special advisor to GM Campbell and as a player development coach. Sexton would remain as head coach through to the end of the 2023–24 regular season, where he was replaced with Jeff Wagner for the duration of the team's playoff run following a poor record in the second half of the season. The team would bounce back but would lose in the first round to Alberni Valley in a closely fought seven-game series.

During a game against the Langley Rivermen on 2 November 2022, the Express set a new all-time attendance record of 2209 fans at the Poirier Sport & Leisure Complex.

== Season-by-season record ==
=== Coquitlam Express, 2001-2005 ===
Note: GP = Games played, W = Wins, L = Losses, T = Ties, OTL = Overtime Losses, PTS = Points, GF = Goals for, GA = Goals against

Season	GP	W	L	T	OTL	PTS	GF	GA	Finish	Playoffs
2001–02	60	20	32	—	8	230	305	48	4th, Mainland	Lost Conf. Quarterfinals, 1–4 (Chiefs)
2002–03	60	24	29	1	6	228	270	55	4th, Mainland	Lost Conf. Quarterfinals, 3–4 (Chiefs)
2003–04	60	32	26	1	1	254	212	66	3rd, Mainland	Lost Conf. Quarterfinals, 3–4 (Chiefs)
2004–05	60	25	31	1	3	211	258	54	3rd, Mainland	Lost Conf. Quarterfinals, 3–4 (Chiefs)

=== Burnaby Express, 2005-2010 ===
Note: GP = Games played, W = Wins, L = Losses, T = Ties, OTL = Overtime Losses, PTS = Points, GF = Goals for, GA = Goals against

Season	GP	W	L	T	OTL	PTS	GF	GA	Finish	Playoffs
2005–06	60	34	20	1	5	231	202	74	2nd, Mainland	Fred Page Cup Champions; Doyle Cup Champions; Royal Bank Cup Champions
2006–07	60	34	25	0	1	260	198	69	4th, Coastal	Lost Conf. Semifinals, 3–4 (Clippers)
2007–08	60	33	24	0	3	218	219	69	4th, Coastal	Lost Conf. Quarterfinals, 2–3 (Grizzlies)
2008–09	60	18	35	1	6	170	245	43	4th, Mainland	did not qualify
2009–10	60	18	36	0	6	175	256	42	8th, Coastal	did not qualify

=== Coquitlam Express, 2010-present ===
Note: GP = Games played, W = Wins, L = Losses, T = Ties, OTL = Overtime Losses, PTS = Points, GF = Goals for, GA = Goals against

Season	GP	W	L	T	OTL	PTS	GF	GA	Finish	Playoffs
2010–11	60	22	28	1	9	218	253	54	7th, Coastal	Lost Conf. Quarterfinals, 0–4 (Eagles)
2011–12	60	36	19	3	2	245	204	77	4th, Coastal	Lost Conf. Semifinals, 2–4 (Kings)
2012–13	56	24	31	1	0	161	210	49	5th, Mainland	did not qualify
2013–14	58	27	26	2	3	226	226	59	3rd, Mainland	Fred Page Cup Champions; 4th in Western Canada Cup
2014–15	58	25	28	1	4	218	238	55	4th, Mainland	Lost Div. Semifinals, 1–4 (Chiefs)
2015–16	58	22	29	1	6	185	247	51	4th, Mainland; 14th, BCHL	Lost Div. Semifinals, 0–4 (Chiefs)
2016–17	58	11	44	2	1	121	305	25	6th, Mainland; 17th, BCHL	did not qualify
2017–18	58	15	38	4	1	138	210	34	5th of 5, Mainland; 16th of 17, BCHL	Lost Div. Quarterfinals, 0–4 (Vees) (Note: cross-over to Interior Division playoff as wildcard)
2018–19	58	28	24	—	6	209	198	62	3rd of 5, Mainland; 9th of 17, BCHL	Lost First Round, 1–4 (Spruce Kings)
2019–20	58	47	9	0	2	227	127	96	1st of 5, Mainland; 1st of 17, BCHL	Won First Round, 4–0 (Rivermen); Season cancelled due to the COVID-19 pandemic
2020–21	20	6	11	0	3	64	93	15	3rd of 3, Coquitlam; 14th of 16, BCHL	Not contested
2021–22	54	22	26	—	6	177	221	50	7th of 9, Coastal; 14th of 18, BCHL	Lost First Round, 3–4 (Chiefs)
2022–23	54	28	19	—	7	191	186	63	4th of 9, Coastal; 6th of 18, BCHL	Lost first round, 1-4 (Chiefs)
2023–24	54	21	29	—	4	146	196	46	6th of 9, Coastal; 12th of 17, BCHL	Lost first round, 3-4 (Bulldogs)
2024–25	54	28	19	5	2	183	192	63	5th of 10, Coastal; 10th of 21, BCHL	Lost Div Quarterfinals 2-4 (Grizzlies)

== Notable alumni ==
Original Coquitlam Express logo

- Mathew Barzal
- Mark Dekanich
- Brad Hunt
- David Jones
- Alexander Kerfoot
- Andrew Ladd
- Milan Lucic
- Wyatt Russell
- Kyle Turris
- Patrick Wiercioch
- Brandon Yip
- Clay Stevenson
- Massimo Rizzo

== Awards and trophies ==
Royal Bank Cup

- 2006

Doyle Cup

- 2006

Mowat Cup

- 2006
- 2014

Fred Page Cup

- 2006
- 2014

Cliff McNabb Memorial Trophy
Coastal Conference Champions

- 2006

Mainland Division Champions

- 2014

Ron Boileau Memorial Trophy
Regular Season Champions

- 2020

Bob Fenton Trophy
Most Sportsmanlike (Coastal)

- Colton Kerfoot: 2016
- Alexander Kerfoot: 2012
- Brock Bradford: 2004

Bruce Allison Memorial Trophy
Rookie Of The Year (Coastal)

- Brett Supinski: 2015
- Alexander Kerfoot: 2012
- Destry Straight: 2011
- Kyle Turris: 2006
- Brett Hemingway: 2002

Brett Hull Trophy
Top Scorer

- Corey Mackin: 2015
- Carlo Finucci: 2008

Vern Dye Memorial Trophy
Most Valuable Player (Coastal)

- Corey Mackin: 2015
- Alex Petan: 2012
- Carlo Finucci: 2008
- Kyle Turris: 2007

Michael Garteig Trophy
Top Goaltender

- Clay Stevenson: 2020

Wally Forslund Trophy
Top Goaltending Duo

- Clay Stevenson & Jack Watson: 2020

Joe Tennant Memorial Trophy
Coach of the Year

- Jason Fortier: 2020

== See also ==
- List of ice hockey teams in British Columbia

Preceded by Weyburn Red Wings	Royal Bank Cup Champions; 2006	Succeeded by Aurora Tigers
