= Chilliwack Chiefs =

- City: Chilliwack, British Columbia
- League: British Columbia Hockey League
- Division: Coastal Conference
- Founded: 1975
- Home arena: Chilliwack Coliseum
- Colours: Maroon, tan, white
- General manager: Brian Maloney
- Head coach: Brian Maloney
- Website: www.chilliwackchiefs.net/

Franchise history
- 1975–2011: Quesnel Millionaires
- 2011–present: Chilliwack Chiefs

The Chilliwack Chiefs are a junior hockey team based in Chilliwack, British Columbia, Canada. They are members of the Coastal Conference of the British Columbia Hockey League (BCHL). They play their home games at the Chilliwack Coliseum which was vacated after the Chilliwack Bruins of the Western Hockey League (WHL) were sold and moved to Victoria, where they became known as the Victoria Royals.

== History ==
The franchise, originally the Quesnel Millionaires, started out in the Peace Cariboo Junior Hockey League (PCJHL) in 1975. The Millionaires are the 1977, 1978, 1979, and 1987 PCJHL Champions. They also won the 1977, 1978, and 1979 Cyclone Taylor Cup Championships. In 1996, the Millionaires moved to the British Columbia Hockey League (BCHL).

On May 9, 2011, the BCHL approved the sale of the Millionaires to the Chiefs Development Group in Chilliwack. The former Chiefs franchise was renamed the Langley Rivermen in preparation for the Millionaires' move to Chilliwack to become the Chiefs.

On May 20, 2018, the Chiefs won their first RBC Cup, 4–2 over the Wellington Dukes while hosting the tournament.

In March 2025, it was announced that Chilliwack has been granted an expansion franchise in the Western Hockey League to play at the Chilliwack Coliseum starting in the 2026-27 season. This comes after Chilliwack previously hosted the Chilliwack Bruins, a WHL franchise from 2006 to 2011 before they were sold to Victoria. The Chilliwack Chiefs have formally indicated they will continue to play in the BCHL for the 2025-26 season and hope to continue past that.

== Season-by-season record ==
Note: GP = Games Played, W = Wins, L = Losses, T = Ties, OTL = Overtime Losses, GF = Goals for, GA = Goals against, Pts = Points

Season	GP	W	L	T	OTL	GF	GA	Pts	Finish	Playoffs
2011–12	60	33	22	2	3	194	196	71	8th BCHL	Lost in Division Semifinals, 2–4 (Vees)
2012–13	56	33	21	3	3	182	153	68	2nd Mainland	Lost in Division Finals, 3–0 (Eagles)
2013–14	58	14	37	2	5	197	285	31	5th Mainland	Did not qualify
2014–15	58	37	17	1	3	215	184	78	1st Mainland	Won first round, 4-1 (Express); Won 2nd round, 4-0 (Spruce Kings); Lost semi-final round robin (Vees, Clippers)
2015–16	58	38	13	4	3	249	155	83	1st of 6, Mainland; 2nd of 17, BCHL	Won Div. Semifinals, 4–0 (Express); Won Div. Finals, 4–1 (Wild); Won Semifinal Round-robin (Warriors, Clippers); Lost League Finals, 2–4 (Warriors)
2016–17	58	41	11	6	0	243	165	88	2nd of 6, Mainland; 2nd of 17, BCHL	Won Div. Semifinals, 4–2 (Rivermen); Won Div. Finals, 4–0 (Wild); Won League Semifinals, 4–2 (Grizzlies); Lost League Finals, 3–4 (Vees)
2017-18	58	26	26	3	3	170	183	58	4th of 5, Mainland; 12th of 17, BCHL	Lost Div. Semifinals, 3–4 (Spruce Kings)
2018–19	58	42	15	—	1	209	169	85	1st of 5, Mainland; 1st of 17, BCHL	Won First Round, 4–3 (Rivermen); Lost Second Round, 0–4 (Spruce Kings)
2019–20	58	26	21	0	11	192	172	63	2nd of 5, Mainland; 10th of 17, BCHL	Lost First Round, 3–4 (Eagles)
2020-21	20	13	7	0	0	66	57	26	2nd of 3, Chiliwack Pod; 7th of 17, BCHL	Covid-19 "pod season" - no playoffs
2021–22	54	33	17	2	2	222	152	70	2nd of 9, Coastal; 4th of 18, BCHL	Won Div. Quarterfinal, 4-3 (Express); Lost Div. Semifinal, 0-4 (Clippers)
2022-23	54	28	22	0	1	162	164	60	5th of 9, Coastal; 10th of 18, BCHL	Won 1st round, 4-1 (Express); Won 2nd round, 4-2 (Clippers); Lost 3rd round, 4-0 (Bulldogs)
2023–24	54	32	17	0	4	171	160	69	2nd of 9, Coastal; 5th of 17, BCHL	Won 1st round, 4-0 (Rivermen); Lost 2nd round, 4-0 (Bulldogs)
2024–25	54	37	12	5	0	254	154	79	1st of 10, Coastal; 3rd of 21, BCHL	Won Conf Quarterfinal 4-3 (Spruce Kings); Wpn Conf Semifinal 4-1 (Bulldogs); Won Conf Finals 4-1 (Grizzlies); Lost League Finals, 2–4 (Bandits)
2024–25	54	30	21	2	1	240	200	63	2nd of 5 Coastal East; 4th of 10, Coastal; 8th of 20, BCHL	Won Conf Quarterfinal 4-1 (Express); Lost Conf Semifinal 3-4 (Clippers

== Western Canada Cup ==
Western Canada Championships: BCHL – AJHL – SJHL – MJHL – Host
Round-robin play with 1st vs. 2nd - winner advance to National Championship & loser to runner-up game
3rd vs. 4th in 2nd semifinal winner to runner-up game loser eliminated.
Runner-up game determines 2nd representative to National Championship.
WCC competition began after the 2013 season.

Year	Round-robin	Record	Standing	Semifinal	Gold medal Game	Runner-up game
2017 (Note: Penticton BCHL champions and WCC hosts. Therefore, Chiliwack advances to WCC as BCHL representative.)	L, Brooks Bandits, 2–5; W, Portage Terriers, 2–1; W, Penticton Vees, 4–2; L, Battlefords North Stars, 0–3	2–0–2–0	2nd of 5	—	L, Brooks Bandits, 1–6	L, Penticton Vees, 2–3

== RBC Cup ==
Canadian Jr. A National Championships
Dudley Hewitt Champions – Central, Fred Page Champions – Eastern, Doyle Cup Champion – Pacific, ANAVET Cup Champion – Western, and Host
Round-robin play with top four in semifinal games and winners to finals.

Year	Round-robin	Record W–OTW–OTL–L	Standing	Semifinal	Gold medal game
2018; Host	OTL, Wenatchee Wild (Pacific) 1–2; OTW, Ottawa Jr. Senators (Eastern) 4–3; W, Wellington Dukes (Central) 2–0; W, Steinbach Pistons (Western) 4–1	2–1–1–0	2nd of 5	W, Ottawa Jr. Senators 3–2	W, Wellington Dukes 4–2; RBC Cup Champions

== See also ==
- List of ice hockey teams in British Columbia
