= Cominco Arena =

Multi-purpose arena in British Columbia, Canada

Trail Memorial Centre
- Interactive map of Trail Memorial Centre
- Location: 1051 Victoria Avenue; Trail, British Columbia
- Coordinates: 49°5′53″N 117°42′34″W
- Owner: City of Trail, British Columbia
- Capacity: Ice hockey: 3,215

Construction
- Opened: 1949

Tenants
- Trail Smoke Eaters (BCHL) (1949–present); Kootenay Ice (BCMML) (1998-2019)

The Cominco Arena is a 2,537-seat multi-purpose arena in Trail, British Columbia. It is home to the Trail Smoke Eaters of the British Columbia Hockey League and also the Kootenay Ice of the BCMML. The arena was funded by donations from the community, particularly from local mining company Consolidated Mining and Smelting, and was built by tradesmen that volunteered their time. It was completed in 1949. The arena was also recently renovated. The seats in the stadium were wooden benches, but were replaced with orange stadium seats.
