= British Columbia Hockey League =

Junior ice hockey league

- Current season, competition or edition: 2026–27 BCHL season
- Formerly: BCJHL (1967–1995); OJHL (1964–1967); OMJHL (1961–1963)
- Association: Independent
- Classification: Amateur
- Sport: Ice hockey
- Founded: 1961; 65 years ago
- Commissioner: Steven Cocker
- No. of teams: 20
- Country: Canada
- Headquarters: Langley, British Columbia
- Region: British Columbia; Alberta
- Most recent champion: Brooks Bandits (2026)
- Most titles: Penticton Vees
- Website: bchl.ca

The British Columbia Hockey League (BCHL) is an independent Canadian Junior ice hockey league with 20 teams in British Columbia and Alberta. It was classified as a Junior "A" league within the Hockey Canada framework, until it became independent in 2023. Since becoming independent, the league characterizes itself simply as a Junior ice hockey league.

== History ==
=== 1961 to 1993 ===
In 1961, the heads of four Junior "B" hockey teams in the Okanagan region of British Columbia got together and formed the first Junior "A" league in British Columbia's history. The Okanagan-Mainline Junior "A" Hockey League (OMJHL) originally consisted of the Kamloops Jr. Rockets, the Kelowna Buckaroos, the Penticton Jr. Vees, and the Vernon Jr. Canadians.

==== Early expansion ====
In 1967, the league expanded out of the Okanagan region, bringing in the New Westminster Royals and the Victoria Cougars of the original (1962–1967) Pacific Coast Junior Hockey League. With the expansion, the league decided that since it was no longer solely in the Okanagan region that it need a new name, becoming the British Columbia Junior Hockey League (BCJHL). A year later, the Vancouver Centennials joined the league. In the 1970s, the Victoria Cougars jumped to the Western Hockey League and the New Westminster team was forced to fold due to the relocation of the Estevan Bruins into their arena. In 1972, the Bellingham Blazers and the Nanaimo Clippers expanded the league to eight teams.

In the early 1970s, the Canadian Amateur Hockey Association separated the two tiers of Junior A hockey. The BCJHL, being a Tier II league, was then disallowed from competing for the Memorial Cup, which had traditionally been the National Junior A Championship trophy. Consequently, the Tier II Junior A leagues across Canada agreed to compete for a new trophy called the Centennial Cup.

==== Rivalry with the PJHL ====
The 1970s also saw the rise of a rival league for the BCJHL, the Pacific Coast Junior Hockey League (PCJHL), which briefly existed in the 1960s and was resurrected for the 1971–72 season. The PCJHL was promoted to a Junior "A" league for the 1973–74 season and changed its name to the Pacific Junior A Hockey League. The PJHL champions competed with the BCJHL champions for the provincial championship, the Mowat Cup.

The existence of the two Junior A leagues in British Columbia caused an unusual turn of events in the 1977–78 season postseason. The BCJHL sent their regular season champion, the Merritt Centennials, to play as the BC representative in the Pacific region (BC and Alberta) interprovincial Doyle Cup, excusing them from the BCJHL playoffs. The BCJHL continued their league playoffs without them, crowning Nanaimo as the playoff champion after Penticton Jr. Vees refused to finish the playoff finals due to a series of brawls in the third game of the series. Meanwhile, the Merritt Centennials won the Doyle Cup and advanced to the Abbott Cup (the Western Canada Championship) against the winner of the ANAVET Cup, the Western region champion Prince Albert Raiders of the Saskatchewan Junior Hockey League. The Centennials lost to the Raiders, four games to one.

==== Merger with the PJHL ====
The PJHL and the BCJHL merged for the 1979–80 season.

During the 1980–81 season, the Coastal division season was interrupted by a strike at BC Ferries in late January. Since the mainland teams could no longer reach the island teams, the Coastal Division stopped playing, and began extended playoff rounds in place of the regular season.

==== National champions ====
In 1986, the Penticton Vees became the BCJHL's first Junior A national championship team, defeating the Metro Valley Junior Hockey League's Cole Harbour Colts by a score of 7–4 to win the Centennial Cup. A year later, the BCJHL's Richmond Sockeyes won the league's second consecutive national title.

=== 1993 to 2021 ===
From 1993 to 2021, the league was a member of the Canadian Junior Hockey League, an association of Junior A leagues across Canada that would play for the National Junior A Championship. The winner of the BCHL Fred Page Cup (not to be confused with the CJHL Fred Page Cup) would continue on to play the Alberta Junior Hockey League champions in the Doyle Cup for the right to compete for the national championship. The BCJHL was renamed the British Columbia Hockey League (BCHL) in 1995.

==== Further expansion and relocations ====
The Burnaby Bulldogs joined as an expansion team in 1998 and moved to Port Alberni in 2002. The Coquitlam Express and the Salmon Arm Silverbacks joined in 2001. The Williams Lake TimberWolves joined in 2002 and folded in 2010.

The Chilliwack Chiefs moved to Langley in 2006 and were later renamed the Langley Rivermen. That team replaced the Langley Hornets who moved to West Kelowna and were later renamed the West Kelowna Warriors. In 2011, the Quesnel Millionaires moved to Chilliwack and were renamed the Chilliwack Chiefs.

The Wenatchee Wild joined in 2015 and ownership moved operations up to the WHL in 2023, following the BCHL move to go independent. The Cranbrook Bucks joined the league in 2020.

=== 2021 to present ===
==== Withdrawal from CJHL and Hockey Canada ====
In March 2021, the BCHL withdrew its membership from the Canadian Junior Hockey League.

On May 1, 2023, the BCHL decided not to renew its agreement with governing body Hockey Canada, and thus became an independent league. The reasons for the decision included more control over their scheduling, particularly the timing of the playoffs, and allowing BCHL teams to recruit players under the age of 18 from outside BC Hockey's territorial jurisdiction.

==== Expansion into Alberta ====
On January 20, 2024, the league announced that five teams from the Alberta Junior Hockey League would join the BCHL in the 2024-25 season, namely, the Blackfalds Bulldogs, Brooks Bandits, Okotoks Oilers, Sherwood Park Crusaders, and Spruce Grove Saints. In the interim, it was decided that the five Alberta-based teams would play out the rest of the 2023-24 season as a separate division under the aegis of the BCHL, and that there would be a year-end competition with the winner of the Alberta-based teams playing the winner of the BC-based teams. Beginning in the 2024–25 BCHL season, the five Alberta-based teams, along with the Cranbrook Bucks, will form the East division of the Interior conference. The Prince George Spruce Kings, who previously were in the Interior Conference, moved to the Coastal Conference's East division.

==== VIJHL affiliation ====
In 2024–25, the league entered into an affiliation agreement with the Vancouver Island Junior Hockey League (VIJHL). Following the announcement of the agreement, some BCHL franchises acquired an ownership stakes in VIJHL clubs. However, sources reported that there would be no club-specific affiliations, and that BCHL teams will be allowed to call players up from, or send players down to, any VIJHL team.

== Current franchises ==
The league's 20 clubs are organized into two conferences—Coastal and Interior—and each conference has an East and West division.

Conference	Division	Team	City	Arena
Coastal	West	Alberni Valley Bulldogs	Port Alberni	Weyerhaeuser Arena
Coastal	West	Cowichan Valley Capitals	Duncan	Cowichan Community Centre
Coastal	West	Nanaimo Clippers	Nanaimo	Frank Crane Arena
Coastal	West	Powell River Kings	Powell River	Hap Parker Arena
Coastal	West	Victoria Grizzlies	Victoria	The Q Centre
Coastal	East	Chilliwack Chiefs	Chilliwack	Chilliwack Coliseum
Coastal	East	Coquitlam Express	Coquitlam	Poirier Sport & Leisure Complex
Coastal	East	Langley Rivermen	Langley	George Preston Recreation Centre
Coastal	East	Prince George Spruce Kings	Prince George	Kopar Memorial Arena
Coastal	East	Surrey Eagles	Surrey	South Surrey Arena
Interior	West	Cranbrook Bucks	Cranbrook	Western Financial Place
Interior	West	Salmon Arm Silverbacks	Salmon Arm	Rogers Rink
Interior	West	Trail Smoke Eaters	Trail	Cominco Arena
Interior	West	Vernon Vipers	Vernon	Kal Tire Place
Interior	West	West Kelowna Warriors	West Kelowna	Royal LePage Place
Interior	East	Blackfalds Bulldogs	Blackfalds	Eagle Builders Centre
Interior	East	Brooks Bandits	Brooks	Centennial Regional Arena
Interior	East	Okotoks Oilers	Okotoks	Viking Rentals Centre
Interior	East	Sherwood Park Crusaders	Sherwood Park	Sherwood Park Arena
Interior	East	Spruce Grove Saints	Spruce Grove	Thompson Family Arena

Map of BCHL teams
Coastal West Coastal East Interior West Interior East
Map of BCHL teams in the Salish Sea region
Coastal West Coastal East Interior West Interior East

== Franchise history ==
- 1961 – Okanagan-Mainline Junior Hockey League founded with Kamloops Jr. Rockets, Kelowna Buckaroos, Penticton Jr. Vees, and Vernon Jr. Canadians
- 1962 – Vernon Jr. Canadians become Vernon Blades
- 1963 – OMJHL changes name to Okanagan Junior Hockey League
- 1963 – Penticton Jr. Vees leave league
- 1964 – Penticton returns as Penticton Broncos
- 1964 – Kamloops Jr. Rockets become Kamloops Kraft Kings
- 1967 – OJHL changes name to British Columbia Junior Hockey League
- 1967 – Vernon Blades become Vernon Essos
- 1967 – Kamloops Kraft Kings become Kamloops Rockets
- 1967 – New Westminster Royals and Victoria Cougars join from Pacific Coast Junior A Hockey League
- 1969 – Vancouver Centennials join league
- 1970 – Chilliwack Bruins join league
- 1971 – New Westminster Royals and Victoria Cougars leave league
- 1972 – Vancouver Centennials become Vancouver Villas
- 1972 – Nanaimo Clippers and Bellingham Blazers join league
- 1973 – Kamloops Rockets move and become White Rock Centennials and then Merritt Centennials
- 1973 – Vancouver Villas leave league
- 1973 – Langley Lords join league
- 1973 – Vernon Essos become Vernon Vikings
- 1975 – Penticton Broncos become Penticton Vees
- 1975 – Bellingham Blazers become Maple Ridge Blazers
- 1976 – Kamloops Braves and Abbotsford Flyers join league
- 1976 – Maple Ridge Blazers become Bellingham Blazers
- 1976 – Chilliwack Bruins become Maple Ridge Bruins
- 1976 – Langley Lords become Langley Thunder
- 1977 – Maple Ridge Bruins move, renamed Revelstoke Bruins
- 1977 – Kamloops Braves become Kamloops Chiefs
- 1978 – Kamloops Chiefs become Kamloops Rockets
- 1978 – Bellingham Blazers become Bellingham Ice Hawks
- 1978 – Chilliwack Colts and Delta Suns join league
- 1979 – Penticton Vees become Penticton Knights
- 1979 – Revelstoke Bruins and Kamloops Rockets merge to become Revelstoke Bruins/Rockets
- 1979 – Richmond Sockeyes and Nor'Wes Caps join league from Pacific Junior A Hockey League
- 1979 – Delta Suns, Langley Thunder, and Vernon Canadians leave league
- 1980 – Vernon rejoins league as Vernon Lakers
- 1980 – Cowichan Valley Capitals and Coquitlam Comets join league
- 1980 – Revelstoke Bruins/Rockets change name to Revelstoke Rockets
- 1980 – Bellingham Ice Hawks move, renamed Vancouver Blue Hawks
- 1980 – Chilliwack Colts cease operations mid-season
- 1981 – Langley Eagles join league
- 1981 – Coquitlam Comets and Nor'Wes Caps cease operations
- 1982 – Esquimalt Buccaneers and Shuswap/Salmon Arm Totems join league
- 1982 – Nanaimo Clippers cease operations
- 1982 – Vancouver Blue Hawks move, renamed Burnaby Blue Hawks
- 1983 – Revelstoke Rockets renamed Revelstoke Rangers
- 1983 – Esquimalt Buccaneers move, renamed Nanaimo Clippers
- 1983 – Kelowna Buckaroos move, renamed Summerland Buckaroos
- 1983 – New Westminster Royals cease operations
- 1984 – Cowichan Valley Capitals move, renamed Sidney Capitals
- 1984 – Vernon Rockets renamed Vernon Lakers
- 1985 – Delta Flyers and Kelowna Packers join league
- 1985 – Burnaby Blue Hawks and Revelstoke Rangers cease operations
- 1985 – Merritt Centennials renamed Merritt Warriors
- 1985 – Abbotsford Flyers renamed Abbotsford Falcons
- 1985 – Salmon Arm Totems renamed Salmon Arm/Shuswap Blazers
- 1986 – Sidney Capitals move, renamed Juan de Fuca Whalers
- 1987 – Salmon Arm/Shuswap Blazers renamed Salmon Arm Tigers
- 1987 – Merritt Warriors renamed Merritt Centennials
- 1987 – Langley Eagles move, renamed Chilliwack Eagles
- 1988 – Summerland Buckaroos and Abbotsford Falcons cease operations
- 1988 – Juan de Fuca Whalers move, renamed Cowichan Valley Whalers
- 1988 – New Westminster Royals rejoin league
- 1988 – Delta Flyers move, renamed Powell River Paper Kings
- 1989 – Kelowna Packers renamed Kelowna Spartans
- 1989 – Chilliwack Eagles move, renamed Ladner Penguins
- 1989 – Cowichan Valley Whalers renamed Cowichan Valley Capitals
- 1989 – Salmon Arm Tigers cease operations
- 1990 – Penticton Knights renamed Penticton Panthers
- 1990 – Victoria Warriors join league
- 1990 – Ladner Penguins move, renamed Bellingham Ice Hawks
- 1990 – Richmond Sockeyes move, renamed Chilliwack Chiefs
- 1990 – Cowichan Valley Capitals cease operations
- 1991 – New Westminster Royals move, renamed Surrey Eagles
- 1993 – Cowichan Valley Capitals rejoin league
- 1993 – Victoria Warriors cease operations
- 1994 – Victoria Salsa, Langley Thunder, Royal City Outlaws join league
- 1995 – Bellingham Ice Hawks sell franchise rights to Trail Smoke Eaters of the Rocky Mountain Junior Hockey League; Trail joins BCHL
- 1995 – Vernon Lakers renamed Vernon Vipers
- 1995 – Kelowna Spartans cease operations
- 1996 – Royal City Outlaws sell franchise rights to Prince George Spruce Kings; both Prince George and the Quesnel Millionaires of the RMJHL join the BCHL
- 1996 – Surrey Eagles renamed South Surrey Eagles
- 1998 – Burnaby Bulldogs join league
- 1998 – Powell River Paper Kings renamed Powell River Kings; Langley Thunder renamed Langley Hornets
- 2001 – Coquitlam Express and Salmon Arm Silverbacks join league
- 2002 – Williams Lake TimberWolves join league
- 2002 – Burnaby Bulldogs move to Alberni Valley
- 2003 – South Surrey Eagles renamed Surrey Eagles
- 2004 – Penticton Panthers renamed Penticton Vees
- 2005 – Coquitlam Express move to Burnaby
- 2006 – Langley Hornets move, renamed Westside Warriors
- 2006 – Chilliwack Chiefs move to Langley
- 2006 – Victoria Salsa renamed Victoria Grizzlies
- 2007 – Williams Lake TimberWolves take leave of absence from league
- 2009 – Williams Lake TimberWolves active in league
- 2010 – Williams Lake TimberWolves declared "not in good standing"; operations suspended
- 2010 – Burnaby Express move to Coquitlam
- 2011 – Quesnel Millionaires move, become Chilliwack Chiefs
- 2011 – Langley Chiefs renamed Langley Rivermen
- 2012 – Westside Warriors renamed West Kelowna Warriors
- 2015 – Wenatchee Wild join league from the North American Hockey League
- 2020 – Cranbrook Bucks join the league as an expansion team
- 2023 – Wenatchee Wild join the WHL
- 2024 – Blackfalds Bulldogs, Brooks Bandits, Okotoks Oilers, Sherwood Park Crusaders, and Spruce Grove Saints switch from the AJHL to the BCHL
- 2024 – Merritt Centennials leave the BCHL
- 2025 – Penticton Vees join the WHL

== League championships ==
The top eight teams from each conference at the end of the regular season advance to the playoffs to compete for the league championship Rogers BCHL Cup, formerly known as the Fred Page Cup.

Year	League champion	League runner-up
2026	Brooks Bandits	Nanaimo Clippers
2025	Brooks Bandits	Chilliwack Chiefs
2024	Surrey Eagles	Penticton Vees
2023	Penticton Vees	Alberni Valley Bulldogs
2022	Penticton Vees	Nanaimo Clippers
2021	Not awarded (Note: 2020 and 2021 playoffs cancelled due to public health restrictions)	
2020	Not awarded	
2019	Prince George Spruce Kings	Vernon Vipers
2018	Wenatchee Wild	Prince George Spruce Kings
2017	Penticton Vees	Chilliwack Chiefs
2016	West Kelowna Warriors	Chilliwack Chiefs
2015	Penticton Vees	Nanaimo Clippers
2014	Coquitlam Express	Vernon Vipers
2013	Surrey Eagles	Penticton Vees
2012	Penticton Vees	Powell River Kings
2011	Vernon Vipers	Powell River Kings
2010	Vernon Vipers	Powell River Kings
2009	Vernon Vipers	Powell River Kings
2008	Penticton Vees	Nanaimo Clippers
2007	Nanaimo Clippers	Vernon Vipers
2006	Burnaby Express	Penticton Vees
2005	Surrey Eagles	Vernon Vipers
2004	Nanaimo Clippers	Salmon Arm Silverbacks
2003	Vernon Vipers	Chilliwack Chiefs
2002	Chilliwack Chiefs	Vernon Vipers
2001	Victoria Salsa	Merritt Centennials
2000	Chilliwack Chiefs	Vernon Vipers
1999	Vernon Vipers	Chilliwack Chiefs
1998	South Surrey Eagles	Penticton Panthers
1997	South Surrey Eagles	Vernon Vipers
1996	Vernon Vipers	Langley Thunder
BCJHL
1995	Chilliwack Chiefs	Powell River Paper Kings
1994	Kelowna Spartans	Cowichan Valley Capitals
1993	Kelowna Spartans	Powell River Paper Kings
1992	Vernon Lakers	Bellingham Ice Hawks
1991	Vernon Lakers	Powell River Paper Kings
1990	New Westminster Royals	Vernon Lakers
1989	Vernon Lakers	New Westminster Royals
1988	Vernon Lakers	Richmond Sockeyes
1987	Richmond Sockeyes	Kelowna Packers
1986	Penticton Knights	Richmond Sockeyes
1985	Penticton Knights	Burnaby Blue Hawks
1984	Langley Eagles	Penticton Knights
1983	Abbotsford Flyers	Kelowna Buckaroos
1982	Penticton Knights	New Westminster Royals
1981	Penticton Knights	Abbotsford Flyers
1980	Penticton Knights	Nanaimo Clippers
1979	Bellingham Blazers	Kamloops Rockets
1978	Merritt Centennials	Penticton Vees
1977	Nanaimo Clippers	Penticton Vees
1976	Nanaimo Clippers	Penticton Vees
1975	Bellingham Blazers	Kelowna Buckaroos
1974	Kelowna Buckaroos	Langley Lords
1973	Penticton Broncos	Chilliwack Bruins
1972	Vernon Essos	Penticton Broncos
1971	Kamloops Rockets	Vancouver Centennials
1970	Vernon Essos	Victoria Cougars
1969	Victoria Cougars	Penticton Broncos
1968	Penticton Broncos	Kelowna Buckaroos
OJHL
1967	Penticton Broncos	Kelowna Buckaroos
1966	Kamloops Kraft Kings	Kelowna Buckaroos
1965	Kelowna Buckaroos	Kamloops Kraft Kings
1964	Kamloops Rockets	Kelowna Buckaroos
OMJHL
1963	Kamloops Rockets	Kelowna Buckaroos
1962	Kamloops Rockets	Kelowna Buckaroos

== National championships ==
The Centennial Cup (known as the Royal Bank Cup from 1996 to 2018) is the Canadian Junior Hockey League championship tournament. It was awarded to BCHL teams 14 times in its history. BCHL teams are no longer eligible to play in the tournament since the league withdrew from the CJHL in 2021.

- 1986: Penticton Knights
- 1987: Richmond Sockeyes
- 1990: Vernon Lakers
- 1991: Vernon Lakers
- 1993: Kelowna Spartans
- 1996: Vernon Vipers
- 1998: South Surrey Eagles
- 1999: Vernon Vipers
- 2006: Burnaby Express
- 2009: Vernon Vipers
- 2010: Vernon Vipers
- 2012: Penticton Vees
- 2016: West Kelowna Warriors
- 2018: Chilliwack Chiefs

== BCHL records ==
Individual records

- Most goals in a season: 105, Brett Hull, Penticton, 1983–84
- Most assists in a season: 111, Bob Ginetti, Burnaby, 1986–87
- Most points in a season: 188, Brett Hull, Penticton, 1983–84
- Most goals in a season, defenceman: 38, Campbell Blair, Vernon, 1986–87
- Most assists in a season, defenceman: 77, Bruce Harris, Bellingham, 1978–79; Ian Kidd, Penticton, 1984–85
- Most points in a season, defenceman: 109, Campbell Blair, Vernon, 1986–87
- Most goals in a season, rookie: 84, John Newberry, Nanaimo, 1979–80
- Most assists in a season, rookie: 103, Doug Berry, Kelowna, 1974–75
- Most points in a season, rookie: 185, John Newberry, Nanaimo, 1979–80
- Most shorthanded goals in a season: 14, Greg Hadden, New Westminster, 1988–89
- Most powerplay goals in a season: 32, Dan Bousquet, Penticton, 1993–94
- Longest consecutive shutout streak: 250 minutes, 25 seconds, Brad Thiessen, Prince George, 2005–06

Team records

- Winning streak in a season: 42 Games Penticton Vees 2011–2012
- Most wins in a season: 54 Penticton Vees, 2011–2012; 52, New Westminster Royals, 1989–90; Vernon Vipers, 1998–99
- Most points in a season: 110, Penticton Vees, 2011–2012
- Most goals scored in a season: 498, Penticton Knights, 1984–85
- Fewest goals against in a season: 130, Penticton Knights, 48-game schedule, 1981–82; 115, Powell River Kings, 60-game schedule, 2010–11

== Notable alumni ==
Brett Hull, a National Hockey League Hall of Famer, played for the Penticton Knights and holds the BCHL record for most goals in a season (105), which he set in 1983–84. Other NHLers who played in the BCHL include Chuck Kobasew of the Penticton Panthers, Scott Gomez of the Surrey Eagles, Carey Price of the Quesnel Millionaires, Willie Mitchell of the Kelowna Spartans, Shawn Horcoff of the Chilliwack Chiefs, and Paul Kariya of the Penticton Panthers.

=== List of NHL alumni ===
- Al Cameron
- Al Hill
- Alan Kerr
- Alexander Kerfoot
- Andrew Hammond
- Andy Moog
- Barry Beck
- Barry Pederson
- Beau Bennett
- Bill Lindsay
- Bill Muckalt
- Blair Chapman
- Bob Gassoff
- Bob Hess
- Bob McGill
- Bob Nicholson
- Bob Nystrom
- Brad Bombardir
- Brad Hunt
- Brad Maxwell
- Brad Palmer
- Brandon Yip
- Brendan Morrison
- **Brett Hull**
- Bruce Affleck
- Bruce Cowick
- Butch Deadmarsh
- Byron Dafoe
- Chris Jensen
- Chris Murray
- Cliff Ronning
- Colin Greening
- Craig Redmond
- Curt Brackenbury
- Curt Fraser
- Dallas Drake
- Dan Hodgson
- Dan Kesa
- Dane Jackson
- Daryl Stanley
- Dave Williams
- Dave Lewis
- David Jones
- David Oliver
- Dean Evason
- Don Ashby
- Don Barber
- Don Murdoch
- Don Nachbaur
- Doug Berry
- Doug Lidster
- **Duncan Keith**
- Dwight Mathiasen
- Ed Beers
- Eddie Johnstone
- Errol Rausse
- Frank Spring
- Fred Berry
- Garry Howatt
- Gary Lupul
- Gary Nylund
- Gene Carr
- Geoff Courtnall
- Glen Metropolit
- **Glenn Anderson**
- Glenn Merkosky
- Grant Mulvey
- Greg C. Adams
- Greg “Gus” Adams
- Greg Fox
- Harold Phillipoff
- Howard Walker
- Ian Kidd
- Jack McIlhargey
- Jamie Benn
- Jan Bulis
- Jason Krog
- Jason Marshall
- Jeff Finley
- Jeff Tambellini
- Jerry Holland
- Jim Harrison
- Joe Murphy
- John Craighead
- John Ogrodnick
- John-Paul Kelly
- Justin Schultz
- Ken Berry
- Ken Priestlay
- Kevin Maxwell
- Kyle Turris
- Larry Hale
- Larry Melnyk
- Larry Playfair
- Link Gaetz
- Mark Lofthouse
- **Mark Recchi**
- Mark Taylor
- Matt Ellison
- Matt Irwin
- Matt Pettinger
- Mel Bridgman
- Milan Lucic
- Miles Zaharko
- Murray Baron
- Nathan Lieuwen
- Olaf Kölzig
- Paul Cyr
- **Paul Kariya**
- Paul Kruse
- Paul Mulvey
- Paul Shmyr
- Randy Rota
- Ray Ferraro
- Reg Kerr
- Richard Kromm
- Rick Lapointe
- Rick Shinske
- Robert Dirk
- Ron Delorme
- Ron Flockhart
- Ron Greschner
- Rudy Poeschek
- Ryan Johansen
- Ryan Walter
- Scott Gomez
- Scott Levins
- Shawn Horcoff
- Stan Smyl
- Steve Kariya
- Steve Passmore
- Steve Tuttle
- Tanner Glass
- Tim Hunter
- Tim Watters
- Todd Ewen
- Tom Martin
- Tom McMurchy
- Tony Currie
- Torrie Robertson
- Troy Stecher
- Tyler Bozak
- Tyson Barrie
- Tyson Jost
- Wade Campbell
- Wayne Bianchin
- Wayne Van Dorp
- Willie Mitchell

== Withdrawal from Hockey Canada ==
In March 2021, the league withdrew its membership from the Canadian Junior Hockey League. The league cited a financial dispute as one of the reasons. It said that there was a long-standing practice of the NHL compensating Hockey Canada when their players are drafted by the NHL. If the draft pick comes from a Major Junior club, the team receives compensation from Hockey Canada. However, if the draft pick comes from a Junior A club, compensation is awarded to the CJHL, not the club.

On May 1, 2023, the BCHL made the controversial decision not to renew its agreement with governing body Hockey Canada, and thus became an independent league. The reasons for the decision included the aim of allowing BCHL teams to recruit players under the age of 18 from outside BC Hockey's territorial jurisdiction. Under Hockey Canada regulations:

Players seventeen (17) years of age and below must register in the Member where their Parent(s) reside, unless the Player is registered in a Hockey Canada School With Residence or Hockey Canada Accredited School, and registers with one (1) of that school’s Teams.

— Hockey Canada, By-laws, Regulations and History, regulation c(1), (June 2023)

The residential qualification did not apply to CHL Major Junior clubs, therefore they had the advantage of being able to recruit 16- and 17-year-old players from any jurisdiction in Canada. However, players who signed with CHL clubs were historically deemed ineligible to play college hockey in the United States because they were considered to be professionals by the NCAA. Therefore, the BCHL sought to attract elite 16- and 17-year-old players who were capable of playing Major Junior but wanted to retain their NCAA eligibility. In 2024 the NCAA changed its position and decided that CHL players were no longer ineligible as of the 2025–26 season. The decision was made after a class action was filed on behalf of a player who was declared ineligible after having played two exhibition games in the OHL when he was 16 years old.

As a consequence of becoming an independent, or non-sanctioned, league, anyone—including players, coaches, trainers, managers and referees—involved with the BCHL after the 30 September cut-off date, is barred from participating in any sanctioned games and programs for the remainder of the season under Hockey Canada's Non-Sanctioned Leagues policy. Players who are cut from BCHL rosters after 30 September would have limited options to play elsewhere. Further, BCHL teams would not be able to recruit affiliate players, i.e. players from a lower tier league that may be selected to play a limited number of games at the higher level, from leagues that are within the Hockey Canada framework. Because of this, the BCHL increased the number of players that teams could include in their regular roster. This was intended to reduce the likelihood of players being cut after the deadline, but also resulted in some players getting less playing time.

In 2024, the Vancouver Island Junior Hockey League (VIJHL) announced that it would also withdraw from the Hockey Canada framework and operate as an independent farm league for the BCHL beginning in the 2024–25 season.
