= Powell River Kings =

- City: Powell River, British Columbia, Canada
- League: British Columbia Hockey League
- Conference: Coastal
- Founded: 1988
- Home arena: Hap Parker Arena
- Colours: Green, gold, white
- General manager: Brennan Menard
- Head coach: Brennan Menard
- Website: powellriverkings.com

Franchise history
- 1976–1985: Abbotsford Flyers
- 1985–1988: Delta Flyers
- 1988–1998: Powell River Paper Kings
- Since 1998: Powell River Kings

The Powell River Kings are a junior ice hockey team based in Powell River, British Columbia, Canada. They are members of the Coastal Conference of the British Columbia Hockey League (BCHL). They play their home games at Hap Parker Arena.

== History ==
Powell River joined the British Columbia Junior Hockey League (BCJHL) for the start of the 1988–89 season with the name the "Paper Kings", when they assumed the Delta Flyers franchise. They dropped the "Paper" from their name for the start of the 1998–99 season.

The Kings had their greatest run of team success from the 2008–09 season through the 2011–12 season, during which they reached the Fred Page Cup finals in four consecutive years. Kings goaltender Michael Garteig, who played for Powell River for two seasons and was instrumental in the 2010–11 finals run, signed as a free agent with the Vancouver Canucks after his 2016-17 season in the NCAA with the Quinnipiac Bobcats. Garteig was called up to the Canucks, dressing as a backup on November 17th, 2016 against the Arizona Coyotes. The BCHL's Top Goaltender Award was renamed in Garteig's honour.

== Season-by-season record ==
Note: GP = Games played, W = Wins, L = Losses, T = Ties, OTL = Overtime Losses, Pts = Points, GF = Goals for, GA = Goals against, PIM = Penalties in minutes

Season	GP	W	L	T	OTL	GF	GA	Pts	Finish	Playoffs
1988–89	60	39	20	1	—	390	286	79	2nd, Coastal	Lost in Semifinals, 3–4 (Royals)
1989–90	61	28	27	6	—	298	325	62	3rd, Coastal	Lost in Quarterfinals
1990–91	60	33	24	3	—	329	308	69	2nd, Coastal	Lost in Finals, 0–4 (Lakers)
1991–92	60	26	32	2	—	302	312	64	1st, Coastal	Lost in Quarterfinals, 0–4 (Clippers)
1992–93	60	34	23	3	—	328	288	71	1st, Coastal	Lost in Finals, 0–4 (Spartans)
1993–94	60	44	15	1	—	369	258	89	1st, Coastal	Lost in Semifinals, 1–4 (Capitals)
1994–95	60	37	22	1	—	300	259	75	1st, Coastal	Lost in Finals, 1–4 (Chiefs)
1995–96	60	35	22	3	—	235	239	73	2nd, Island	Lost in Quarterfinals, 0–4 (Thunder)
1996–97	60	33	24	3	—	193	202	69	3rd, Coastal	Lost in Semifinals, 1–4 (Eagles)
1997–98	60	28	29	3	—	202	214	59	4th, Coastal	Lost in Preliminary, 1–2 (Clippers)
1998–99	60	17	43	—	0	216	346	34	4th, Coastal	Did not qualify
1999–00	60	21	34	—	5	194	270	47	4th, Coastal	Did not qualify
2000–01	60	19	35	—	6	183	255	44	4th, Island	Did not qualify
2001–02	60	25	28	—	7	195	216	57	4th, Island	Lost in Preliminary, 1–4 (Clippers)
2002–03	60	33	21	2	4	239	209	72	2nd, Island	Lost in Quarterfinals, 0–3 (Chiefs)
2003–04	60	26	25	2	7	199	234	61	3rd, Island	Lost in Preliminary, 3–4 (Clippers)
2004–05	60	28	24	0	8	210	223	64	3rd, Island	Lost in Preliminary, 1–4 (Bulldogs)
2005–06	60	20	35	3	2	177	231	45	5th, Island	Lost in Preliminary, 1–4 (Chiefs)
2006–07	60	25	27	3	5	203	243	58	6th, Coastal	Lost in Preliminary, 2–4 (Capitals)
2007–08	60	26	23	1	10	209	217	63	6th, Coastal	Lost in Quarterfinals, 0–4 (Clippers)
2008–09	60	39	16	1	4	251	184	83	1st, Mainland	Lost in Finals, 2–4 (Vipers)
2009–10	60	36	17	1	6	216	160	79	2nd, Coastal	Lost in Finals, 3–4 (Vipers)
2010–11	60	46	9	3	2	224	115	97	1st, Coastal	Lost in Finals, 0–4 (Vipers)
2011–12	60	40	16	2	2	223	127	84	1st Coastal	Lost in Finals, 0–4 (Vees)
2012–13	56	20	25	2	9	160	183	51	4th Coastal	Lost Quarterfinals 3–2
2013–14	58	36	16	2	4	201	156	78	2nd Coastal	Lost Division Semifinals 2–4 (Grizzlies)
2014–15	58	27	21	1	9	208	205	64	3rd Coastal	Lost Division Finals 3–4 (Clippers)
2015–16	58	33	20	4	1	217	166	71	2nd of 5, Island; 6th of 17, BCHL	Won Div. Semifinals 4–2 (Capitals); Lost Div. Finals, 0–4 (Clippers)
2016–17	58	37	19	1	1	237	171	76	2nd of 5, Island; 5th of 17, BCHL	Won Div. Semifinals 4–0 (Capitals); Lost Div. Finals 3–4 (Grizzlies)
2017-18	58	29	19	6	4	214	176	68	3rd of 5, Island; 8th of 17, BCHL	Won Div. Semifinals 4–2 (Clippers); Won Div Finals 4–1 (Grizzlies); Lost Semifinals 1–4 (Spruce Kings)
2018–19	58	34	21	—	3	217	180	71	2nd of 5, Island; 6th of 17, BCHL	Won First Round, 4–1 (Clippers); Lost Second Round, 3–4 (Grizzlies)
2019–20	58	29	23	0	6	180	175	64	3rd of 5, Island; 9th of 17, BCHL	Lost First Round, 1–4 (Capitals)
2021–22	20	7	11	1	1	65	94	16	2nd of 3, Coquitlam Pod; 13th of 16, BCHL	Covid-19 "pod season" - no playoffs
2021–22	54	13	32	7	2	150	252	35	9th of 9, Coastal; 17th of 18, BCHL	Did not qualify
2022–23	54	20	26	0	5	193	231	48	7th of 9, Coastal; 14th of 18, BCHL	Lost 1st round, 1–4 (Eagles)
2023–24	54	13	35	0	5	165	210	33	9th of 9, Coastal; 17th of 17, BCHL	Did not qualify
2024–25	54	9	31	5	1	120	267	24	10th of 10, Coastal; 21st of 21, BCHL	Did not qualify
2025–26	54	12	38	3	1	173	305	25	5th of 5 Coastal W 9th of 10, Coastal; 19th of 20, BCHL	Did not qualify

== NHL alumni ==
A few former players have gone on to the NHL. Brad Bombardir won a Stanley Cup with the New Jersey Devils, Jeff Hoggan was the captain of the AHL's Grand Rapids Griffins, Robb Gordon was a 2nd round draft choice of the Vancouver Canucks playing in four games, Dean Malkoc played for Vancouver and Boston, former assistant coach Cory Clouston spent four seasons as head coach of the Ottawa Senators, and Daniel Carr logged 117 games across six seasons in the NHL with Montréal, Vegas, Nashville, and Washington. Other draftees are forwards Scott Kirton (Chicago), Derek Bekar (St. Louis), Matt Siddall (Atlanta), defenseman Calvin Elfring (Quebec) and goaltenders Peter Brady (Vancouver) and Sean Maguire (Pittsburgh)

- Brad Bombardir
- Daniel Carr
- Cory Clouston
- Paul Crowder
- Robb Gordon
- Jeff Hoggan
- Dean Malkoc
- Clayton Stoner
- Michael Garteig

The Kings have also employed former NHL players, with six-time Stanley Cup champion Glenn Anderson serving as head coach and general manager from 2023 to 2024, and former Vancouver Canuck Cliff Ronning joining Anderson's coaching staff during the 2023-24 BCHL season.

=== Retired numbers ===
- 5 Brad Bombardir
- 19 Heath Dennison
- 22 Jack Long

=== Honored people ===
- Joe Mastrodonato (Builder)
- Kent Lewis (Coach ) 500 wins

== Awards and trophies ==
Ron Boileau Memorial Trophy (Regular Season Champions)

- 2011

Cliff McNabb Memorial Trophy
Coastal Conference Champions

- 2012
- 2011
- 2010
- 2009
- 1993
- 1991

Goaltender Award
Best Goaltender

- Jeff Smith 2014
- Michael Garteig 2011
- Pete Brady: 1997

Brett Hull Trophy
Top Scorer

- Darcy Oakes: 2009
- Robb Gordon: 1994

Joe Tennant Memorial Trophy
Coach Of The Year (Coastal)

- Kent Lewis 2011
- Kent Lewis: 2009
- Terry Perkins: 2003
- Terry Perkins: 2002
- Kent Lewis: 1994

Bob Fenton Trophy
Most Sportsmanlike (Coastal)

- Darcy Oakes: 2009
- Adam Presizniuk: 2007
- Hugo Gigeure: 1998
- Shane Henry: 1990

Defensive Award
Best Defenceman (Coastal)

- Craig Dalrymple 2012
- Justin Dasilva 2011
- Mat Bodie: 2010
- Michael Wakita: 2006

Vern Dye Memorial Trophy
Most Valuable Player (Coastal)

- Matt Garbowsky 2011
- Pete Brady: 1997
- Robb Gorden: 1994
- Jay McNeill: 1992

Bruce Allison Memorial Trophy
Rookie Of The Year (Coastal)

- Mat Bodie: 2009
- Calvin Elfring: 1994
- Robb Gordon: 1993
- Jay McNeill: 1991

Wally Forslund Memorial Trophy (For goalie tandem with lowest combined goals-against average)

- Michael Garteig/Sean Maguire 2011
- Sean Maguire/Jonah Imoo 2012

== See also ==
- List of ice hockey teams in British Columbia
