= Weyerhaeuser Arena =

Sports arena in Port Alberni, British Columbia

Coordinates: 49.25600°N 124.79109°W

- Interactive map of Weyerhaeuser Arena
- Location: Port Alberni, British Columbia, Canada
- Owner: City of Port Alberni
- Capacity: 1,854 (Hockey)

Construction
- Opened: June, 2001
- Cost: $7.4 million

Tenants
- Alberni Valley Bulldogs (BCHL) (2002–present); Mt. Arrowsmith Skating Club

The Weyerhaeuser Arena is part of the Alberni Valley Multiplex, between the North Island College campus and the Bob Dailey Stadium in Port Alberni, British Columbia. It has twin ice sheets for hockey, figure skating and recreational skating but also has the capacity for concerts, conventions and other events.

The arena has been the home rink of the Alberni Valley Bulldogs of the BCHL since 2002, various local minor league hockey teams, and the Mt. Arrowsmith Skating Club. Public recreational skating and recreational hockey is available throughout the season. Among other sports, the multiplex also provides a venue for lacrosse.

In 2022, the Alberni Valley Bulldogs installed a new LED video screen to be used during games for instant replay, among other things.
