= Royal LePage Place =

Arena in West Kelowna, British Columbia

- Interactive map of Royal LePage Place
- Location: West Kelowna, British Columbia, Canada
- Coordinates: 49.85801°N 119.58202°W
- Capacity: Concerts: 1,650; Ice hockey: 1,520 (with standing room)

Construction
- Groundbreaking: June 30, 2005
- Opened: September 21, 2007

Tenant
- West Kelowna Warriors (BCHL) (2007-Present)

Royal LePage Place, is a 1500-seat multi-purpose arena in West Kelowna, British Columbia, Canada. It was completed in 2007. Royal LePage Place is the home of the West Kelowna Warriors ice hockey team. It has a maximum capacity of 1520 plus standing room. The building is a low carbon emitter. Constructed with a heat recovery unit that captures heat from the ice plant. The heat is then stored under the building in underground wells. The heat is then used to heat the building.It is located at the foot of Mount Boucherie, next to Jim Lind Arena, Mount Boucherie Secondary School and the City of West Kelowna offices in the Mt. Boucherie Community Centre. Royal LePage Place will also be used for many other events including concerts, trade shows, and various community gatherings. Royal LePage Place was used as a muster point during the 2009 Glenrosa Forest Fire and 2023 McDougall Creek Fire.
