= West Kelowna Warriors =

Junior "A" ice hockey team in the BCHL

- City: West Kelowna, British Columbia, Canada
- League: British Columbia Hockey League
- Conference: Interior
- Founded: 1994
- Home arena: Royal LePage Place
- Colours: Maroon and tan
- Owners: JMRH Hockey Development ULC (John Murphy and Rod Hume)
- General manager: Liam Blackburn
- Head coach: Wyatt Head
- Website: http://www.westkelownawarriors.ca

Franchise history
- 1994–1998: Langley Thunder
- 1998–2006: Langley Hornets
- 2006–2012: Westside Warriors
- 2012–present: West Kelowna Warriors

The West Kelowna Warriors are a Junior "A" ice hockey team from West Kelowna, British Columbia, Canada. They are a part of the British Columbia Hockey League (BCHL) and play in the Interior Conference.

The West Kelowna Warriors are a relocated franchise, moving to West Kelowna in 2006 from Langley, British Columbia.

== History ==
=== Langley Thunder/Hornets ===
Langley was originally granted a British Columbia Junior Hockey League (BCJHL) franchise in 1973 called the Langley Lords. The team played as the Lords through the 1975–76 season. In those three years they had very decent regular seasons, making it to the playoffs each year, including a loss in the league finals in their first season. In 1976 the Lords changed their name to the Langley Thunder. Their regular season performance diminished each year and they missed the playoffs for the first time in the franchise's history in the 1978–79 season. Shortly after the completion of the 1978–79 season, the franchise ceased operations. An unrelated BCJHL franchise, the Chilliwack Colts, relocated to become the Langley Eagles from 1981–82 through the 1986–87 seasons, before moving back to Chilliwack, British Columbia.

Langley Hornets Logo

In 1990, the BCJHL was renamed the BCHL, and in 1994 Langley returned to the BCHL with a new franchise, adopting the name Thunder from the defunct franchise of the 1970s. The new franchise competed as the Thunder for five seasons, reaching the BCHL championship finals in 1996, which they lost to the eventual Junior A national Royal Bank Cup champion Vernon Vipers, 4–1.

The Thunder changed their name to the Langley Hornets before the start of the 1998–99 season. Playing in Langley from 1998 through the 2005–06 season, the Hornets were led by several coaches. Coach Rick Lanz was notable for taking the last place 2001–02 team and guiding them to a fourth-place finish in the 2002–03 season, though the team would be eliminated in the first round of the BCHL playoffs. Lanz was not re-signed for the next season and the team returned to last place in the BCHL.

=== Westside/West Kelowna Warriors ===
Westside Warriors Logo

Before the start of the 2006–07 season the franchise moved from Langley to the unincorporated area on the "westside" of Kelowna, British Columbia, and renamed themselves the Westside Warriors. The Westside Warriors found immediate success, reaching the BCHL playoffs in the 2006–07 season, followed in 2007–08 with a third place BCHL finish in the regular season and making it to the BCHL semi-finals in the playoffs.

In late 2007, the unincorporated area the Westside Warriors called home became the incorporated Westside District Municipality, and in 2008 changed its name to West Kelowna. The franchise kept the place name Westside, rather than West Kelowna, through the 2011–12 season. In the summer of 2012, the Westside Warriors announced they would be changing their name to the West Kelowna Warriors, recognizing the proper name of the municipality where they play.

In 2018, the Warriors were purchased by Kim Dobranski and KD Sports Ltd. from Mark Cheyne and the Vision Sports Group LLP.

In October 2019, the BCHL confirmed that it was in talks to buy the West Kelowna Warriors from owners Kim Dobranski and Linda Wang, with unaudited financial results that showed the team profited just over $10,000, the first time the team was ever profitable since moving to West Kelowna. In November 2019, the Warriors were purchased by John Murphy and Rod Hume under JMRH Hockey Development ULC, with Murphy serving as governor and Hume as managing partner, and the BCHL approving the sale and the sale effective date being November 11, 2019. The Warriors also announced that Chris Laurie was named team president.

== Season-by-season records ==
Note: GP = Games played, W = Wins, L = Losses, T = Ties, OTL = Overtime losses, GF = Goals for, GA = Goals against, Pts = Points

=== BCJHL Langley Lords/Thunder ===
Season	GP	W	L	T	GF	GA	Pts	Finish	Playoffs
1973–74	64	38	24	2	326	283	78	1st, Coastal	Lost in Finals
1974–75	66	34	31	1	330	351	69	1st, Coastal	Lost in Quarter-finals
1975–76	66	32	31	3	349	298	67	5th, League	Lost in Quarter-finals
1976–77	68	30	37	1	351	362	62	3rd, Coastal	Lost in Semi-finals
1977–78	66	19	47	0	250	423	38	5th, Coastal	Lost in Quarter-finals
1978–79	62	22	36	4	284	348	48	5th, Coastal	Did not qualify

=== Current BCHL franchise ===
Season	GP	W	L	T	OTL	GF	GA	Pts	Finish	Playoffs
Langley Thunder
1994–95	60	38	21	1	—	321	252	77	2nd, Mainland	Lost in Quarter-finals
1995–96	60	38	19	3	—	317	273	79	2nd, Mainland	Lost in Finals
1996–97	60	21	35	4	—	228	289	46	7th, Coastal	Did not qualify
1997–98	60	26	31	3	—	219	239	55	6th, Coastal	Did not qualify
Langley Hornets
1998–99	60	44	12	4	—	330	219	92	1st, Mainland	Lost in Semi-finals
1998–99	60	20	38	—	2	242	294	42	3rd, Mainland	Lost in 1st round
1999–00	60	41	17	—	2	305	247	84	1st, Mainland	Lost in Semi-finals
2000–01	60	29	25	—	6	222	239	64	4th, Mainland	Lost in 1st round
2001–02	60	19	34	—	7	226	274	45	5th, Mainland	Did not qualify
2002–03	60	34	22	—	1	225	231	72	2nd, Mainland	Lost in 1st round
2003–04	60	19	36	1	4	205	286	43	4th, Mainland	Did not qualify
2004–05	60	12	42	1	5	169	277	30	4th, Mainland	Did not qualify
2005–06	60	32	23	1	4	179	181	69	3rd, Mainland	Lost in Quarter-finals
Westside Warriors
2006–07	60	23	25	3	9	192	221	58	7th, Mainland	Lost in Preliminary
2007–08	60	40	17	0	3	237	161	83	3rd, BCHL	Lost in Semi-finals
2008–09	60	37	18	1	4	220	162	79	5th, BCHL	Did not qualify
2009–10	60	38	18	1	3	244	173	80	4th, BCHL	Lost quarter-final
2010–11	60	33	20	2	5	246	183	73	4th, Interior	Lost Division Semi-final
2011–12	60	22	29	2	7	190	208	53	11th, BCHL	Did not qualify
West Kelowna Warriors
2012–13	56	30	13	4	9	205	151	73	2nd, Interior; 4th, BCHL	Won Div. Finals, 4–1 (Centennials); Lost Conf. Finals, 4–1 (Vees)
2013–14	58	35	15	3	5	225	173	78	2nd, Interior; 5th, BCHL	Lost div. semi-finals, 4–2 (Vipers)
2014–15	58	29	21	0	8	205	210	44	4th of 6, Interior; 7th of 16, BCHL	Lost div. semi-finals, 4–1 (Vees)
2015–16	58	38	17	2	1	242	180	79	2nd of 6, Interior; 3rd of 17, BCHL	Won Div. Semi-finals, 4–2 (Silverbacks); Won Div. Finals, 4–2 (Vees); 2nd of 3, round-robin Won League Finals, 4–2 (Chiefs); Advance to Western Canada Cup
2016–17	58	27	29	2	0	175	204	56	4th of 6, Interior; 9th of 17, BCHL	Lost div. semi-finals 4–0 (Centennials)
2017–18	58	28	27	2	1	198	221	59	5th of 7, Interior; 11th of 17, BCHL	Lost div. semi-finals 4–0 (Smoke Eaters)
2018–19	58	28	28	—	2	210	220	58	6th of 7, Interior; 12th of 17, BCHL	Lost First Round, 3–4 (Wild)
2019–20	58	16	33	0	9	160	223	41	6th of 7, Interior; 16th of 17, BCHL	Lost First Round, 1–4 (Vees)
2021–22	20	8	10	1	1	58	72	18	10th of 16, BCHL	Season Lost to covid
2020–21	54	37	16	0	1	231	156	75	3rd of 9, Interior; 3rd of 18, BCHL	Won Div Quarterfinal, 4-1 (Vipers); Won Div Semifinal 4-1 (Silverbacks); Lost Div Finals 0-4 (Vees)
2022–23	54	28	20	0	6	211	205	62	3rd of 9, Interior; 7th of 18, BCHL	Lost Div Quarterfinal, 2-4 (Vipers)
2022–23	54	33	10	0	11	208	158	77	2nd of 8, Interior; 3rd of 17, BCHL	Won Div Quarterfinal, 4-3 (Bucks); Lost Div Semifinals 1-4 (Silverbacks)
2024–25	54	23	24	5	2	157	173	53	7th of 11, Interior; 14th of 21, BCHL	Lost Div Quarterfinal, 1-4 (Bandits)

=== Western Canada Cup ===
Western Canada championship from 2013 to 2017
Participants: British Columbia Hockey League (BCHL) – Alberta Junior Hockey League (AJHL) – Saskatchewan Junior Hockey League (SJHL) – Manitoba Junior Hockey League (MJHL) – host team
Round-robin play with 1st vs. 2nd winner advancing to RBC Cup junior A national championship and loser to a runner-up game.
3rd vs. 4th in semifinal with winner to the runner-up game and loser eliminated.
Runner-up game determined second representative to national championship.

Year	Round-robin	Record	Standing	Semifinal	Runner-up game	Championship game
2016	W, Estevan Bruins (host) 3–0; L, Brooks Bandits (AJHL) 2–4; OTW, Portage Terriers (MJHL) 3–2; W, Melfort Mustangs (SJHL) 4–1	3–1–0	2nd of 5	—	—	W, Brooks Bandits 6–0; Cup Champions

=== Royal Bank Cup ===
Hockey Canada junior A national championship
Participants in 2016: Dudley Hewitt Cup champions (Central), Fred Page Cup champions (Eastern, Western Canada Cup champions (Western #1), Western Canada Cup runners-up (Western #2) and a host team
Round-robin play with top four in semifinal and winners to finals.

Year	Round-robin	Record W–OTW–OTL–L	Standing	Semifinal	Championship game
2016	W, Lloydminster Bobcats (host) 5–2; L, Brooks Bandits (Western #2) 1–5; OTW, Trenton Golden Hawks (Central) 4–3; W, Carleton Place Canadians (Eastern) 4–1	2–1–0–1	3rd of 5	W, Brooks Bandits 4–1	W, Lloydminster Bobcats 4–0; Canadian Junior A Champions

== See also ==
- List of ice hockey teams in British Columbia

Preceded by Portage Terriers	Royal Bank Cup Champions; 2016	Succeeded by Cobourg Cougars
