= Nanaimo Clippers =

Canadian junior ice hockey team founded 1972

- City: Nanaimo, British Columbia, Canada
- League: British Columbia Hockey League
- Division: Coastal West
- Founded: 1972
- Home arena: Frank Crane Arena
- Colours: Orange, silver, black, white
- Head coach: Colin Birkas
- Website: www.nanaimoclippers.com

Franchise history
- 1972–1982: Nanaimo Clippers
- 1982–1983: Esquimalt Buccaneers
- 1983–present: Nanaimo Clippers

The Nanaimo Clippers are a junior ice hockey team based in Nanaimo, British Columbia, Canada. They are members of the Coastal West Division of the British Columbia Hockey League (BCHL). They play their home games at Frank Crane Arena.

== Franchise history ==
The original owner Cliff McNabb, drew inspiration for the name from the local teams of the Nanaimo Minor Hockey Association who prior to 1972 as well as after, were known as the Clippers. The Nanaimo Clippers won the league championship in the 1976 playoffs but lost by default for the Mowat Cup (Provincial Championship). The Clippers were once again league champions in 1978 when the Penticton Vees refused to play the balance of the series (citing rough play – the series stood at 2 games to 1). The Merritt Centennials were earlier chosen to represent the league for the 1978 CAHA Championships. The Nanaimo Clippers folded after the 1982 season, but were started up again before the 1983 season as the Esquimalt Buccaneers. The franchise was moved to Nanaimo early in the 1983 season, playing at the Nanaimo Civic Arena, and renamed the team the Nanaimo Clippers.

The Clippers' primary logo from 1997-2024

In 1998, the Clippers hosted the Royal Bank Cup getting three wins and a loss in round-robin play. The Clippers entered the semi-finals as the second seed behind the South Surrey Eagles also of the BCHL. The Weyburn Red Wings were the Clippers' opponent in the semi-final and defeated them by a score of 4–1, South Surrey went on to win the National Championship.

On March 13, 2004, with 80 seconds left in the third period and the score tied 3–3 in game seven during the first round of the playoffs against Powell River Kings, the Powell River goalie left his crease and froze the puck for a whistle. Under league rules, the goalie was guilty of delay of game. But instead of calling a two-minute penalty, the referee incorrectly awarded a penalty shot. Nanaimo scored and won the game, 4–3. Powell River protested and league officials agreed to cover all costs for fixing the mistake. The Kings went back to Nanaimo on March 16 to replay the final 1:20 of the third period, with the score tied at 3–3. Powell River started a man short for the delay-of-game penalty but neither team scored in regulation. Just 54 seconds into overtime, Nanaimo captain Michael Olson scored the game-winning goal. The Clippers went on to beat Chilliwack 3–1 in a best-of-five series, Surrey 4–0 in a best-of-seven semifinal and the Salmon Arm Silverbacks 4–1 in the best-of-seven championship final. After taking the BCHL Championship, the Clippers went on to oust the Grande Prairie Storm for the Doyle Cup, earning themselves a berth in the Royal Bank Cup.

On April 16, 2007, the Clippers won the Fred Page Cup by defeating the Vernon Vipers three to two in game six of the BCHL finals. The winning goal was scored by Tyler Mazzei with 36 seconds remaining in the third period at the Vernon Multiplex.

In March 2017, the Nanaimo city council approved a referendum for the construction of a $88 million arena to help solidify a potential Western Hockey League team, either by relocation or expansion, possibly forcing the Clippers to either relocate to another market or fold. The referendum was on March 11 and was rejected by 80% of those voting. The team was purchased by Vancouver-based lawyer Wesley Mussio in 2017.

== Season-by-season record ==
Note: GP = Games played, W = Wins, L = Losses, T = Ties, OTL = Overtime losses, Pts = Points, GF = Goals for, GA = Goals against, PIM = Penalties in minutes

| Season | GP | W | L | T | OTL | GF | GA | Pts | PIM | Finish | Playoffs |
|---|---|---|---|---|---|---|---|---|---|---|---|
| 1972–73 | 62 | 31 | 30 | 1 | — | 352 | 335 | 63 | | 1st, Coastal | Lost semifinals, 3–4 (Bruins) |
| 1973–74 | 64 | 21 | 41 | 2 | — | 243 | 321 | 44 | | 4th, Coastal | Lost quarterfinals, 2–4 (Lords) |
| 1974–75 | 66 | 21 | 45 | 0 | — | 303 | 385 | 42 | | 4th, Coastal | Lost semifinals, 2–4 (Blazers) |
| 1975–76 | 66 | 41 | 21 | 4 | — | 384 | 279 | 89 | | 2nd, BCJHL | Fred Page Cup Champions (Vees) |
| 1976–77 | 68 | 46 | 19 | 3 | — | 403 | 323 | 95 | | 1st, Coastal | Fred Page Cup Champions, 4–2 (Vees) |
| 1977–78 | 66 | 41 | 23 | 2 | — | 392 | 324 | 84 | 2251 | 1st, Coastal | Fred Page Cup Champions (Vees) |
| 1978–79 | 62 | 33 | 26 | 3 | — | 367 | 346 | 69 | 1625 | 2nd, Coastal | Lost semifinals, 0–4 (Blazers) |
| 1979–80 | 66 | 41 | 24 | 1 | — | 433 | 346 | 83 | | 2nd, Coastal | Lost finals, 3–4 (Knights) |
| 1980–81 | 44 | 33 | 10 | 1 | — | 307 | 200 | 67 | 1417 | 1st, Coastal | Lost quarterfinals |
| 1981–82 | 48 | 12 | 36 | 0 | — | 232 | 347 | 24 | | 6th, Coastal | did not qualify |
| 1982–83 | 56 | 30 | 25 | 1 | — | 309 | 314 | 61 | 2420 | 3rd, Coastal | Lost quarterfinals, 2–4 (Royals) |
| 1983–84 | 50 | 30 | 19 | 1 | — | 303 | 256 | 61 | | 2nd, Coastal | Lost semifinals, 2–4 (Eagles) |
| 1984–85 | 52 | 21 | 31 | 0 | — | 328 | 367 | 42 | | 5th, Coastal | did not qualify |
| 1985–86 | 52 | 25 | 26 | 1 | — | 305 | 337 | 51 | | 3rd, Coastal | Lost quarterfinals, 2–4 (Flyers) |
| 1986–87 | 52 | 24 | 27 | 1 | — | 276 | 292 | 49 | | 4th, Coastal | Lost quarterfinals, 0–4 (Sockeyes) |
| 1987–88 | 52 | 28 | 20 | 4 | — | 277 | 252 | 60 | | 3rd, Coastal | Lost quarterfinals, 2–4 (Flyers) |
| 1988–89 | 60 | 32 | 25 | 3 | — | 309 | 312 | 67 | 2931 | 3rd, Coastal | Lost quarterfinals, 0–4 (Paper Kings) |
| 1989–90 | 60 | 38 | 21 | 1 | — | 381 | 314 | 77 | 2326 | 2nd, Coastal | Lost semifinals, 3–4 (Royals) |
| 1990–91 | 60 | 25 | 32 | 3 | — | 307 | 342 | 53 | | 3rd, Coastal | Lost quarterfinals, 1–4 (Paper Kings) |
| 1991–92 | 60 | 27 | 30 | 3 | — | 319 | 309 | 57 | 3059 | 3rd, Coastal | Lost semifinals, 2–4 (Ice Hawks) |
| 1992–93 | 60 | 29 | 29 | 2 | — | 320 | 326 | 60 | 1738 | 3rd, Coastal | Lost semifinals, 3–4 (Paper Kings) |
| 1993–94 | 60 | 21 | 36 | 3 | — | 270 | 351 | 45 | | 4th, Coastal | Lost quarterfinals, 1–4 (Paper Kings) |
| 1994–95 | 60 | 25 | 33 | 2 | — | 280 | 330 | 52 | | 3rd, Coastal | Lost preliminary, 0–2 (Eagles) |
| 1995–96 | 60 | 30 | 25 | 5 | — | 251 | 236 | 65 | 1284 | 3rd, Island | Lost quarterfinals, 1–4 (Vipers) |
| 1996–97 | 60 | 34 | 22 | 4 | — | 263 | 243 | 72 | | 2nd, Coastal | Lost quarterfinals, 1–4 (Paper Kings) |
| 1997–98 | 60 | 30 | 29 | 1 | — | 215 | 223 | 61 | | 5th, Coastal | Lost quarterfinals, 0–4 (Eagles) |
| 1998–99 | 60 | 37 | 21 | — | 2 | 298 | 229 | 76 | | 1st, Coastal | Lost Division Quarterfinals, 0–3 (Salsa) |
| 1999–00 | 60 | 28 | 21 | — | 11 | 202 | 218 | 67 | | 3rd, Coastal | Lost Conference Semifinals, 2–4 (Chiefs) |
| 2000–01 | 60 | 31 | 25 | — | 4 | 221 | 216 | 66 | 1673 | 1st, Island | Lost preliminary, 3–4 (Salsa) |
| 2001–02 | 60 | 41 | 17 | — | 2 | 262 | 215 | 84 | | 1st, Island | Lost semifinals, 1–4 (Chiefs) |
| 2002–03 | 60 | 41 | 16 | 3 | 0 | 267 | 196 | 85 | | 1st, Island | Lost quarterfinals, 0–3 (Eagles) |
| 2003–04 | 60 | 37 | 15 | 2 | 6 | 256 | 161 | 82 | 2131 | 2nd, Island | Fred Page Cup Champions, 4–1 (Silverbacks); Doyle Cup Champions |
| 2004–05 | 60 | 48 | 9 | 0 | 3 | 240 | 142 | 99 | | 1st in League | Lost semifinals |
| 2005–06 | 60 | 44 | 12 | 0 | 4 | 255 | 160 | 92 | | 1st in League | Lost quarterfinals |
| 2006–07 | 60 | 41 | 12 | 2 | 5 | 287 | 187 | 89 | | 1st in League | Won Fred Page Cup |
| 2007–08 | 60 | 42 | 14 | 0 | 4 | 249 | 155 | 88 | | 1st in League | Lost in Finals |
| 2008–09 | 60 | 28 | 24 | 2 | 6 | 186 | 193 | 64 | | 9th BCHL | Lost in First Round |
| 2009–10 | 60 | 24 | 25 | 1 | 10 | 197 | 204 | 59 | | 10th BCHL | Lost in Quarterfinals |
| 2010–11 | 60 | 29 | 23 | 1 | 7 | 203 | 205 | 66 | | 5th, Coastal | Lost Division Quarterfinals |
| 2011–12 | 60 | 26 | 25 | 0 | 9 | 186 | 193 | 61 | | 10th BCHL | did not qualify |
| 2012–13 | 56 | 32 | 20 | 0 | 4 | 182 | 167 | 68 | | 2nd, Island | Lost Division Semifinals |
| 2013–14 | 58 | 27 | 28 | 1 | 2 | 176 | 172 | 57 | | 3rd, Island | Lost Division Semifinals |
| 2014–15 | 58 | 37 | 16 | 0 | 5 | 235 | 167 | 79 | | 1st of 5, Island; 2nd of 16, BCHL | Won, Div. Semifinals, 4–3 (Bulldogs); Won, Div. Finals, 4–3 (Kings); 2nd of 3 Mini Series, advanced Lost League Finals, 2–4 (Vees) |
| 2015–16 | 58 | 38 | 18 | 1 | 1 | 235 | 186 | 78 | | 1st of 5, Island; 4th of 17, BCHL | Won Div. Semifinals, 4–1 (Bulldogs); Won Div. Finals, 4–0 (Kings); 3rd of 3 Mini Series, eliminated |
| 2016–17 | 58 | 23 | 28 | 6 | 1 | 146 | 199 | 53 | | 4th of 5, Island; 14th of 17, BCHL | Lost div. semi-finals, 1–4 (Grizzlies) |
| 2017–18 | 58 | 32 | 20 | 3 | 3 | 198 | 177 | 70 | | 2nd of 5, Island; 6th of 17, BCHL | Lost div. semi-finals, 2–4 (Kings) |
| 2018–19 | 58 | 27 | 30 | — | 1 | 180 | 213 | 55 | 750 | 3rd of 5, Island; 14th of 17, BCHL | Lost First Round, 1–4 (Kings) |
| 2019–20 | 58 | 37 | 17 | 0 | 4 | 183 | 134 | 78 | 772 | 1st of 5, Island; 3rd of 17, BCHL | Won First Round, 4–0 (Bulldogs); Season cancelled due to the COVID-19 pandemic |
| 2020–21 | 20 | 8 | 11 | 0 | 1 | 59 | 82 | 17 | 255 | 3rd of 4, Alberni Val. Pod; 11th of 16, BCHL | Covid-19 "pod season" - no playoffs |
| 2021–22 | 54 | 33 | 17 | 3 | 1 | 210 | 172 | 70 | 583 | 3rd of 9, Coastal; 6th of 18, BCHL | Won Div Quarterfinal, 4–0 (Eagles); Won Div. Semifinal, 4-0 (Chiefs); Won Div. Finals 4-0, (Rivermen); Lost League Finals 0-4 (Vees) |
| 2022-23 | 54 | 37 | 14 | 0 | 3 | 207 | 174 | 77 | 540 | 1st of 9, Coastal; 2nd of 18, BCHL | Won Div Quarterfinal, 4–2 (Rivermen); Lost Div. Semifinal, 2-4 (Chiefs) |
| 2023-24 | 54 | 27 | 29 | 0 | 4 | 203 | 191 | 58 | 565 | 5th of 10, Coastal; 10th of 17, BCHL | Lost Div Quarterfinal, 1-4 (Grizzlies) |
| 2024–25 | 54 | 29 | 21 | 4 | 0 | 198 | 184 | 62 | 549 | 6th of 10, Coastal; 12th of 21, BCHL | Lost Div Quarterfinal, 1-4 (Capitals) |
| 2025-26 | 54 | 30 | 18 | 0 | 6 | 217 | 180 | 66 | 773 | 2nd of 5, Coastal West; 3rd of 10, Coastal; 6th of 20, BCHL | Won Div. Quarterfinal, 4–1 (Bulldogs); Won Div. Semifinal, 4-3 (Capitals); Lost League Finals, 1-4 (Bandits) |

== NHL alumni ==
- Greg C. Adams
- Byron Bitz
- Mel Bridgman
- Dylan Coghlan
- Paul Cyr
- Tony Feltrin
- Wade Flaherty
- Jason Garrison
- Tanner Glass
- Colin Greening
- Al Hill
- Matt Irwin
- Steve Kariya
- Terry Kleisinger
- Rick Lapointe
- David LeNeveu
- Gary Lupul
- John Newberry
- Ryan O'Byrne
- Barry Pederson
- Ken Priestlay
- Sheldon Rempal
- Geordie Robertson
- Torrie Robertson
- Mark Rycroft
- Raymond Sawada

== See also ==
- List of ice hockey teams in British Columbia
