= 2022 IIHF World Championship Group A =

Group A was one of two groups of the 2022 IIHF World Championship. The four best placed teams advanced to the playoff round, while the last placed team was relegated to Division I in 2023.

== Standings ==
Pos	Team	Pld	W	OTW	OTL	L	GF	GA	GD	Pts	Qualification or relegation
1	Switzerland	7	6	1	0	0	34	15	+19	20	Quarterfinals
2	Germany	7	5	0	1	1	26	20	+6	16	Quarterfinals
3	Canada	7	5	0	0	2	34	18	+16	15	Quarterfinals
4	Slovakia	7	4	0	0	3	23	19	+4	12 (Note: Slovakia 7–1 Denmark)	Quarterfinals
5	Denmark	7	4	0	0	3	18	18	0	12	
6	France	7	1	1	0	5	11	24	−13	5	
7	Kazakhstan	7	1	0	0	6	19	31	−12	3	
8	Italy (R)	7	0	0	1	6	12	32	−20	1	Relegation to 2023 Division I A

Source: IIHF
Rules for classification: 1) points; 2) head-to-head points; 3) head-to-head goal difference; 4) head-to-head number of goals scored; 5) result against closest best-ranked team outside tied teams; 6) result against second-best ranked team outside tied teams; 7) seeding before tournament.
(R) Relegated

== Matches ==
All times are local (UTC+3).

=== France vs Slovakia ===
13 May 2022; 16:20	France	2–4 (0–1, 2–2, 0–1)	Slovakia	Helsinki Ice Hall, Helsinki; Attendance: 3,731

Game reference

Henri-Corentin Buysse
Goalies
Patrik Rybár
Referees:
(Finland) Lassi Heikkinen
(United States) Jake Rekuchi
Linesmen:
(United Kingdom) Daniel Beresford
(Austria) Elias Seewald

	0–1	10:23 – Regenda (Grman, Roman)
	0–2	21:54 – Tatar (Slafkovský, Lantoši) (PP)
Rech (Boudon) – 26:06	1–2
Perret (Claireaux, Auvitu) – 32:49	2–2
	2–3	38:03 – Takáč (Liška, Nemec)
	2–4	59:52 – Regenda (Slafkovský, Čerešňák) (EN)

10 min
Penalties
4 min
18
Shots
28

=== Germany vs Canada ===
13 May 2022; 20:20	Germany	3–5 (0–2, 1–3, 2–0)	Canada	Helsinki Ice Hall, Helsinki; Attendance: 4,632

Game reference

Philipp Grubauer
Goalies
Logan Thompson
Referees:
(Latvia) Andris Ansons
(Czech Republic) Robin Šír
Linesmen:
(United States) Jake Davis
(Czech Republic) Josef Špůr

	0–1	08:06 – Sillinger (Anderson, Lowry)
	0–2	17:22 – Dubois
Michaelis (Seider, Pföderl) – 27:24	1–2
	1–3	31:37 – Dubois (Roy, Batherson) (PP)
	1–4	33:39 – Johnson (Mercer, Chabot) (PP)
	1–5	37:35 – Gregor (Comtois, Sanheim)
Plachta (Stützle, Seider) (PP2) – 41:13	2–5
Seider (Stützle, Pföderl) (PP2) – 52:35	3–5

6 min
Penalties
8 min
21
Shots
27

=== Denmark vs Kazakhstan ===
14 May 2022; 12:20	Denmark	9–1 (3–0, 4–0, 2–1)	Kazakhstan	Helsinki Ice Hall, Helsinki; Attendance: 3,035

Game reference

Sebastian Dahm
Goalies
Andrei Shutov
Ilya Rumyantsev
Referees:
(Latvia) Andris Ansons
(France) Pierre Dehaen
Linesmen:
(Finland) Tommi Niittylä
(Latvia) Dāvis Zunde

Bjorkstrand (Bau Hansen, Larsen) – 02:03	1–0
Scheel – 03:59	2–0
Blichfeld (Ehlers, M. Lauridsen) (PP) – 04:51	3–0
Storm (Ehlers, Jensen Aabo) – 22:26	4–0
Jakobsen (Aagaard) – 26:22	5–0
Blichfeld (Ehlers, M. Lauridsen) (PP) – 29:54	6–0
Larsen (Bau Hansen, M. Lauridsen) – 39:36	7–0
Regin (Lauridsen, Storm) – 40:43	8–0
Blichfeld (M. Lauridsen, Bau Hansen) (PP) – 50:03	9–0
	9–1	58:37 – Savitski (Shestakov) (SH)

8 min
Penalties
16 min
37
Shots
26

=== Switzerland vs Italy ===
14 May 2022; 16:20	Switzerland	5–2 (3–0, 1–0, 1–2)	Italy	Helsinki Ice Hall, Helsinki; Attendance: 3,641

Game reference

Reto Berra
Goalies
Andreas Bernard
Referees:
(Norway) Roy Stian Hansen
(Slovakia) Peter Stano
Linesmen:
(Austria) Elias Seewald
(Czech Republic) Josef Špůr

Malgin (Simion, Siegenthaler) – 00:49	1–0
Thürkauf (Corvi, Siegenthaler) – 17:05	2–0
Ambühl (Siegenthaler, Scherwey) – 19:42	3–0
Thürkauf (Kurashev, Scherwey) – 26:20	4–0
	4–1	48:40 – Glira (Hannoun, McNally)
Hischier (Meier, Bertschy) – 58:20	5–1
	5–2	58:52 – Hannoun (S. Kostner, Petan) (PP)

4 min
Penalties
4 min
47
Shots
14

=== Slovakia vs Germany ===
14 May 2022; 20:20	Slovakia	1–2 (0–0, 1–2, 0–0)	Germany	Helsinki Ice Hall, Helsinki; Attendance: 4,387

Game reference

Patrik Rybár
Goalies
Philipp Grubauer
Referees:
(Finland) Lassi Heikkinen
(Sweden) Linus Öhlund
Linesmen:
(Finland) Hannu Sormunen
(Sweden) Emil Yletyinen

	0–1	21:34 – Plachta (M. Müller)
	0–2	26:41 – Pföderl (Noebels)
Pospíšil (Jánošík, Tamáši) – 31:15	1–2

6 min
Penalties
4 min
29
Shots
16

=== Italy vs Canada ===
15 May 2022; 12:20	Italy	1–6 (1–1, 0–3, 0–2)	Canada	Helsinki Ice Hall, Helsinki; Attendance: 2,616

Game reference

Justin Fazio
Goalies
Chris Driedger
Referees:
(France) Pierre Dehaen
(Norway) Roy Stian Hansen
Linesmen:
(United Kingdom) Daniel Beresford
(Latvia) Dāvis Zunde

Pietroniro (McNally, Frigo) – 12:57	1–0
	1–1	15:50 – Sanheim (Severson, Anderson)
	1–2	28:15 – Anderson (Mayo, Lowry)
	1–3	35:14 – Roy (Dubois, Graves)
	1–4	37:30 – Johnson (Chabot, Barzal)
	1–5	42:49 – Mayo (Comtois, Mercer)
	1–6	54:54 – Gregor (Mercer) (SH)

2 min
Penalties
8 min
12
Shots
30

=== France vs Kazakhstan ===
15 May 2022; 16:20	France	2–1 (0–1, 2–0, 0–0)	Kazakhstan	Helsinki Ice Hall, Helsinki; Attendance: 1,801

Game reference

Henri-Corentin Buysse
Goalies
Andrei Shutov
Referees:
(Czech Republic) Robin Šír
(Slovakia) Peter Stano
Linesmen:
(Finland) Tommi Niittylä
(Sweden) Emil Yletyinen

	0–1	05:08 – Orekhov (Mikhailis, Blacker)
Texier (Gallet, Rech) – 32:31	1–1
Chakiachvili (Texier, T. Bozon) (PP) – 39:35	2–1

2 min
Penalties
4 min
23
Shots
27

=== Denmark vs Switzerland ===
15 May 2022; 20:20	Denmark	0–6 (0–1, 0–4, 0–1)	Switzerland	Helsinki Ice Hall, Helsinki; Attendance: 2,645

Game reference

Frederik Dichow
Sebastian Dahm
Goalies
Leonardo Genoni
Referees:
(Sweden) Linus Öhlund
(United States) Jake Rekuchi
Linesmen:
(United States) Jake Davis
(Finland) Hannu Sormunen

0–1	08:58 – Herzog (Glauser, Corvi)
0–2	21:03 – Meier (Moser, Malgin) (PP)
0–3	25:01 – Suter (Malgin, Simion)
0–4	32:39 – Moser (Malgin, Suter)
0–5	37:33 – Kurashev (Hischier, Corvi) (PP)
0–6	46:39 – Malgin (Meier, Moser) (PP)

8 min
Penalties
12 min
19
Shots
29

=== Slovakia vs Canada ===
16 May 2022; 16:20	Slovakia	1–5 (1–1, 0–2, 0–2)	Canada	Helsinki Ice Hall, Helsinki; Attendance: 3,585

Game reference

Adam Húska
Goalies
Logan Thompson
Referees:
(Latvia) Andris Ansons
(Sweden) Linus Öhlund
Linesmen:
(Austria) Elias Seewald
(Sweden) Emil Yletyinen

	0–1	10:48 – Lowry (Severson, Anderson)
Takáč (Nemec, Regenda) (PP) – 12:47	1–1
	1–2	26:11 – Dubois (Cozens, Roy) (PP)
	1–3	37:56 – Dubois (Geekie, Graves)
	1–4	41:08 – Sillinger (Lowry, Anderson)
	1–5	51:18 – Geekie (Cozens, Holden)

8 min
Penalties
8 min
35
Shots
44

=== France vs Germany ===
16 May 2022; 20:20	France	2–3 (1–2, 1–0, 0–1)	Germany	Helsinki Ice Hall, Helsinki; Attendance: 2,652

Game reference

Sebastian Ylönen
Goalies
Mathias Niederberger
Referees:
(Norway) Roy Stian Hansen
(Finland) Lassi Heikkinen
Linesmen:
(Czech Republic) Josef Špůr
(Latvia) Dāvis Zunde

	0–1	02:04 – Fischbuch (Pföderl, Michaelis) (PP)
Texier (Bozon, Chakiachvili) (PP) – 14:48	1–1
	1–2	17:51 – Ehl (Bittner, Kastner)
Gallet (Bertrand, Claireaux) – 31:18	2–2
	2–3	45:45 – Pföderl (Noebels, Michaelis)

6 min
Penalties
6 min
18
Shots
30

=== Italy vs Denmark ===
17 May 2022; 16:20	Italy	1–2 (0–1, 1–0, 0–1)	Denmark	Helsinki Ice Hall, Helsinki; Attendance: 2,557

Game reference

Andreas Bernard
Goalies
Sebastian Dahm
Referees:
(France) Pierre Dehaen
(Czech Republic) Robin Šír
Linesmen:
(Austria) Elias Seewald
(Czech Republic) Josef Špůr

	0–1	15:54 – Ehlers (Blichfeld, Bau Hansen) (PP)
Petan (Hannoun, Miglioranzi) (PP) – 39:00	1–1
	1–2	41:46 – Bau Hansen (Meyer)

12 min
Penalties
6 min
14
Shots
45

=== Switzerland vs Kazakhstan ===
17 May 2022; 20:20	Switzerland	3–2 (0–0, 2–0, 1–2)	Kazakhstan	Helsinki Ice Hall, Helsinki; Attendance: 2,858

Game reference

Sandro Aeschlimann
Goalies
Andrei Shutov
Referees:
(Norway) Roy Stian Hansen
(Slovakia) Peter Stano
Linesmen:
(United Kingdom) Daniel Beresford
(Latvia) Dāvis Zunde

Malgin (Kurashev, Siegenthaler) – 23:58	1–0
Simion – 34:32	2–0
	2–1	45:47 – Blacker (SH)
Herzog (Ambühl) – 55:39	3–1
	3–2	57:52 – Orekhov (Mikhailis, Valk)

4 min
Penalties
4 min
43
Shots
14

=== France vs Italy ===
18 May 2022; 16:20	France	2–1 OT (0–1, 0–0, 1–0) (OT: 1–0)	Italy	Helsinki Ice Hall, Helsinki; Attendance: 1,543

Game reference

Henri-Corentin Buysse
Goalies
Andreas Bernard
Referees:
(Finland) Lassi Heikkinen
(Sweden) Linus Öhlund
Linesmen:
(Finland) Tommi Niittylä
(Sweden) Emil Yletyinen

	0–1	14:42 – Frigo (SH)
Treille (Fleury, Auvitu) (EA) – 58:54	1–1
Gallet (T. Bozon) – 61:04	2–1

10 min
Penalties
6 min
36
Shots
21

=== Switzerland vs Slovakia ===
18 May 2022; 20:20	Switzerland	5–3 (1–1, 2–1, 2–1)	Slovakia	Helsinki Ice Hall, Helsinki; Attendance: 2,504

Game reference

Leonardo Genoni
Goalies
Adam Húska
Referees:
(Latvia) Andris Ansons
(United States) Jake Rekuchi
Linesmen:
(United States) Jake Davis
(Finland) Hannu Sormunen

Malgin (Suter) (SH) – 00:52	1–0
	1–1	10:33 – Roman (Lantoši, Liška)
Egli (Scherwey, Bertschy) – 23:56	2–1
	2–2	25:32 – Slafkovský (Krištof, Tatar)
Meier (Suter) – 32:59	3–2
Hischier (Marti) – 45:44	4–2
	4–3	49:07 – Takáč (Sýkora, Grman)
Herzog (Malgin, Suter) (EN) – 59:36	5–3

43 min
Penalties
10 min
30
Shots
16

=== Germany vs Denmark ===
19 May 2022; 18:00 (Note: The game, originally scheduled for 16:20, was delayed after a fire alarm inside the arena.)	Germany	1–0 (0–0, 1–0, 0–0)	Denmark	Helsinki Ice Hall, Helsinki; Attendance: 2,570

Game reference
Philipp Grubauer	Goalies	Sebastian Dahm	Referees: (Finland) Lassi Heikkinen (Slovakia) Peter Stano; Linesmen: (United States) Jake Davis (Finland) Hannu Sormunen
Michaelis (Noebels, Fischbuch) (PP) – 32:41 / 1–0			Referees: (Finland) Lassi Heikkinen (Slovakia) Peter Stano; Linesmen: (United States) Jake Davis (Finland) Hannu Sormunen
4 min	Penalties	6 min	Referees: (Finland) Lassi Heikkinen (Slovakia) Peter Stano; Linesmen: (United States) Jake Davis (Finland) Hannu Sormunen
13	Shots	18	Referees: (Finland) Lassi Heikkinen (Slovakia) Peter Stano; Linesmen: (United States) Jake Davis (Finland) Hannu Sormunen

=== Canada vs Kazakhstan ===
19 May 2022; 21:30 (Note: The game, originally scheduled for 20:20, was delayed after a fire alarm inside the arena delayed the game before.)	Canada	6–3 (3–2, 1–0, 2–1)	Kazakhstan	Helsinki Ice Hall, Helsinki; Attendance: 2,299

Game reference

Logan Thompson
Goalies
Andrei Shutov
Referees:
(United States) Jake Rekucki
(Germany) Marian Rohatsch
Linesmen:
(France) Nicolas Constantineau
(Finland) Tommi Niittylä

	0–1	02:25 – Petukhov (Gurkov, Asetov)
Cozens (Graves, Roy) – 03:45	1–1
	1–2	12:16 – Shestakov (Akolzin, Panyukov) (PP)
Batherson (Johnson, Graves) – 14:18	2–2
Lowry (Johnson, Anderson) (PP) – 17:20	3–2
Severson (Gregor) – 32:14	4–2
	4–3	47:55 – Savitski (Mikhailis, Orekhov)
Cozens (Batherson, Severson) (PP) – 51:58	5–3
Cozens (Dubois, Severson) (PP) – 59:11	6–3

14 min
Penalties
14 min
37
Shots
19

=== Germany vs Italy ===
20 May 2022; 16:20	Germany	9–4 (4–0, 2–1, 3–3)	Italy	Helsinki Ice Hall, Helsinki; Attendance: 3,311

Game reference

Mathias Niederberger
Goalies
Davide Fadani
Justin Fazio
Referees:
(Latvia) Andris Ansons
(Sweden) Linus Öhlund
Linesmen:
(United Kingdom) Daniel Beresford
(Sweden) Emil Yletyinen

Karachun (J. Müller, Loibl) – 05:01	1–0
Wissmann (Kastner) – 06:17	2–0
Ehliz (Bittner, Michaelis) – 13:14	3–0
Fischbuch (Wissmann, Reichel) (PP) – 17:57	4–0
Reichel (Noebels, Michaelis) (PP) – 25:01	5–0
	5–1	25:37 – Traversa (Miglioranzi, Pietroniro)
Fischbuch (Reichel, Wissmann) – 34:55	6–1
Ehliz (Michaelis, Schmölz) – 41:24	7–1
Karachun (Schmölz, Loibl) – 42:45	8–1
	8–2	47:26 – Frigo (Petan)
	8–3	49:50 – Mantenuto (Trivellato, D. Kostner) (PP)
Soramies (Wissmann, Kastner) – 57:04	9–3
	9–4	59:41 – Petan (Hannoun, Glira)

4 min
Penalties
8 min
26
Shots
20

=== Kazakhstan vs Slovakia ===
20 May 2022; 20:20	Kazakhstan	3–4 (2–1, 0–3, 1–0)	Slovakia	Helsinki Ice Hall, Helsinki; Attendance: 3,068

Game reference

Andrei Shutov
Goalies
Adam Húska
Referees:
(Norway) Roy Stian Hansen
(Czech Republic) Robin Šír
Linesmen:
(United States) Jake Davis
(Latvia) Dāvis Zunde

	0–1	12:12 – Kollár (Takáč)
Panyukov (Blacker, Orekhov) (PP) – 15:17	1–1
Shevchenko (Starchenko, Valk) (PP) – 17:52	2–1
	2–2	29:47 – Fehérváry (Liška, Slafkovský (PP)
	2–3	33:18 – Liška (Krištof, Húska) (PP)
	2–4	34:26 – Slafkovský (PS)
Panyukov (Orekhov) – 43:32	3–4

5 min
Penalties
6 min
17
Shots
34

=== Denmark vs France ===
21 May 2022; 12:20	Denmark	3–0 (1–0, 1–0, 1–0)	France	Helsinki Ice Hall, Helsinki; Attendance: 3,007

Game reference

Sebastian Dahm
Goalies
Henri-Corentin Buysse
Referees:
(Norway) Roy Stian Hansen
(United States) Jake Rekucki
Linesmen:
(United Kingdom) Daniel Beresford
(Finland) Hannu Sormunen

Regin (Storm, Lauridsen) – 16:43	1–0
Blichfeld (Lauridsen, Ehlers) (PP) – 25:28	2–0
Jakobsen (Storm) (EN) – 58:24	3–0

6 min
Penalties
10 min
30
Shots
19

=== Canada vs Switzerland ===
21 May 2022; 16:20	Canada	3–6 (3–3, 0–1, 0–2)	Switzerland	Helsinki Ice Hall, Helsinki; Attendance: 5,676

Game reference

Logan Thompson
Goalies
Leonardo Genoni
Referees:
(Finland) Lassi Heikkinen
(Sweden) Linus Öhlund
Linesmen:
(United States) Jake Davis
(Czech Republic) Josef Špůr

Johnson (Batherson, Graves) – 11:52	1–0
	1–1	12:51 – Fora (Meier, Kurashev)
Lowry (SH) – 14:11	2–1
	2–2	15:33 – Kukan (Hischier, Corvi) (PP)
Batherson (Barzal) – 19:03	3–2
	3–3	19:51 – Siegenthaler (Suter, Malgin)
	3–4	26:13 – Hischier (Kukan) (PP)
	3–5	43:41 – Suter (Malgin, Simion)
	3–6	58:01 – Meier (EN)

8 min
Penalties
9 min
25
Shots
27

=== Italy vs Slovakia ===
21 May 2022; 20:20	Italy	1–3 (0–2, 0–0, 1–1)	Slovakia	Helsinki Ice Hall, Helsinki; Attendance: 3,442

Game reference

Andreas Bernard
Goalies
Adam Húska
Referees:
(Latvia) Andris Ansons
(Germany) Marian Rohatsch
Linesmen:
(France) Nicolas Constantineau
(Latvia) Dāvis Zunde

	0–1	10:31 – Krištof (Tatar, Slafkovský)
	0–2	19:54 – Sýkora (Slafkovský, Tatar)
Trivellato (S. Kostner) (PP) – 44:09	1–2
	1–3	49:14 – Tamáši (Ivan, Lantoši) (PP)

10 min
Penalties
8 min
17
Shots
34

=== Kazakhstan vs Germany ===
22 May 2022; 16:20	Kazakhstan	4–5 (2–3, 1–1, 1–1)	Germany	Helsinki Ice Hall, Helsinki; Attendance: 3,124

Game reference

Andrei Shutov
Goalies
Dustin Strahlmeier
Referees:
(Norway) Roy Stian Hansen
(Sweden) Linus Öhlund
Linesmen:
(United Kingdom) Daniel Beresford
(Finland) Tommi Niittylä

Starchenko – 02:57	1–0
	1–1	04:38 – J. Müller (Bittner, Karachun)
Petukhov (Asetov, Daniyar) – 15:46	2–1
	2–2	16:10 – Pföderl (Seider)
	2–3	18:33 – Fischbuch (Wagner, Seider)
	2–4	25:52 – Reichel (Gawanke, Noebels) (PP2)
Akolzin (Starchenko, Daniyar) – 39:29	3–4
Mikhailis (Sagadeyev, Metalnikov) – 40:38	4–4
	4–5	47:08 – Ehliz (Wissmann, Bittner)

6 min
Penalties
4 min
22
Shots
36

=== Switzerland vs France ===
22 May 2022; 20:20	Switzerland	5–2 (0–2, 3–0, 2–0)	France	Helsinki Ice Hall, Helsinki; Attendance: 3,997

Game reference

Reto Berra
Goalies
Sebastian Ylönen
Referees:
(Canada) Jeff Ingram
(Canada) Fraser Lawrence
Linesmen:
(Denmark) Andreas Krøyer
(Germany) Jonas Merten

	0–1	04:58 – Texier
	0–2	13:25 – Claireaux (Texier, T. Bozon)
Hischier (Meier, Kukan) – 20:25	1–2
Riat (Geisser, Hischier) – 32:27	2–2
Ambühl (Corvi, Kukan) (PP) – 35:42	3–2
Kukan (Herzog, Corvi) – 51:17	4–2
Hischier (Herzog, Ambühl) (EN) – 59:38	5–2

6 min
Penalties
14 min
39
Shots
19

=== Kazakhstan vs Italy ===
23 May 2022; 16:20	Kazakhstan	5–2 (2–1, 1–1, 2–0)	Italy	Helsinki Ice Hall, Helsinki; Attendance: 1,983

Game reference

Andrei Shutov
Goalies
Andreas Bernard
Referees:
(United States) Jake Rekucki
(Slovakia) Peter Stano
Linesmen:
(Finland) Hannu Sormunen
(Czech Republic) Josef Špůr

Valk (Dietz, Starchenko) (PP) – 11:22	1–0
	1–1	14:57 – McNally (Miglioranzi, Pietroniro) (PP)
Orekhov (Mikhailis, Rakhmanov) – 15:59	2–1
Asetov (Petukhov, Blacker) – 24:29	3–1
	3–2	25:26 – Kostner (Di Perna, Hannoun)
Starchenko (Dietz, Blacker) (PP) – 43:20	4–2
Mikhailis (Orekhov, Akolzin) – 46:02	5–2

4 min
Penalties
27 min
35
Shots
15

=== Canada vs Denmark ===
23 May 2022; 20:20	Canada	2–3 (0–2, 1–0, 1–1)	Denmark	Helsinki Ice Hall, Helsinki; Attendance: 4,005

Game reference

Chris Driedger
Goalies
Sebastian Dahm
Referees:
(Czech Republic) Robin Šír
(Switzerland) Miroslav Stolc
Linesmen:
(United Kingdom) Daniel Beresford
(Sweden) Emil Yletyinen

	0–1	09:11 – M. Lauridsen (Asperup, Poulsen)
	0–2	14:54 – Regin (Storm) (SH)
Comtois (Lowry) – 22:33	1–2
	1–3	52:11 – Bau Hansen (Ehlers, Storm) (PP)
Graves (Severson, Dubois) – 56:09	2–3

33 min
Penalties
8 min
31
Shots
24

=== Germany vs Switzerland ===
24 May 2022; 12:20	Germany	3–4 GWS (2–1, 0–2, 1–0) (OT: 0–0) (SO: 0–1)	Switzerland	Helsinki Ice Hall, Helsinki; Attendance: 3,862

Game reference

Philipp Grubauer
Goalies
Reto Berra
Referees:
(Sweden) Linus Öhlund
(Slovakia) Peter Stano
Linesmen:
(Czech Republic) Josef Špůr
(Sweden) Emil Yletyinen

	0–1	01:37 – Ambühl (Corvi, Herzog)
Wissmann (Reichel) (PP) – 11:51	1–1
Loibl (Seider, M. Müller) – 15:30	2–1
	2–2	21:26 – Suter (Malgin, Kukan)
	2–3	38:31 – Malgin (Moser, Meier) (PP)
Plachta (Wissmann) – 47:57	3–3

Loibl (miss)
Plachta (miss)
Noebels (miss)
Fischbuch (miss)
Shootout
Hischier
Riat
(miss) Suter
(miss) Malgin
2 min
Penalties
8 min
27
Shots
33

=== Slovakia vs Denmark ===
24 May 2022; 16:20	Slovakia	7–1 (2–0, 3–0, 2–1)	Denmark	Helsinki Ice Hall, Helsinki; Attendance: 3,084

Game reference

Adam Húska
Goalies
Sebastian Dahm
Referees:
(United States) Sean MacFarlane
(United States) Jake Rekucki
Linesmen:
(Finland) Hannu Sormunen
(Canada) Nathan van Oosten

Tatar (Krištof) – 10:00	1–0
Tatar (Krištof) – 19:37	2–0
Regenda (Slafkovský, Nemec) (PP) – 21:57	3–0
Rosandić (Lunter, Nemec) – 32:17	4–0
Slafkovský (Krištof) – 38:20	5–0
	5–1	47:43 – Blichfeld (Lauridsen, Ehlers) (PP)
Nemec (Takáč, Roman) – 58:53	6–1
Regenda (Nemec, Lantoši) (PP) – 59:19	7–1

8 min
Penalties
16 min
37
Shots
25

=== Canada vs France ===
24 May 2022; 20:20	Canada	7–1 (2–0, 2–0, 3–1)	France	Helsinki Ice Hall, Helsinki; Attendance: 2,873

Game reference

Chris Driedger
Goalies
Sebastian Ylönen
Referees:
(Latvia) Andris Ansons
(Finland) Lassi Heikkinen
Linesmen:
(Finland) Tommi Niittylä
(Latvia) Dāvis Zunde

Cozens (Sanheim, Batherson) – 12:40	1–0
Comtois (Sanheim, Lowry) – 17:31	2–0
Dubois (Cozens, Batherson) – 22:07	3–0
O'Dell (Whitecloud, Holden) – 35:10	4–0
Whitecloud (Mercer) – 45:29	5–0
	5–1	48:20 – Rech
Dubois (Batherson, Cozens) – 51:16	6–1
Severson (Dubois, Batherson) – 55:19	7–1

6 min
Penalties
4 min
44
Shots
19
