= Clay Stevenson =

Canadian ice hockey player (born 1999)

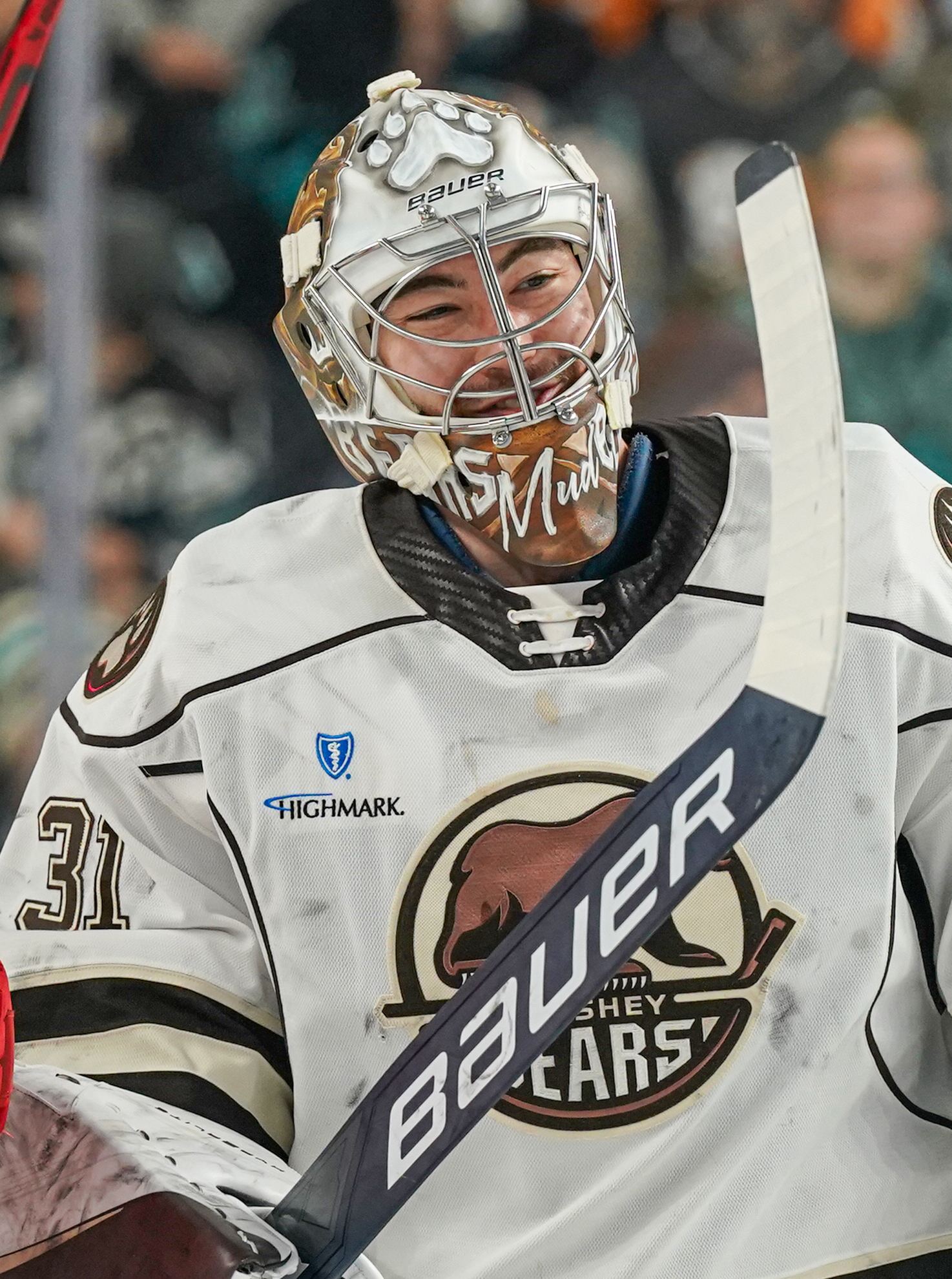
- Stevenson with the Hershey Bears in 2024
- Born: March 3, 1999 (age 27) Drayton Valley, Alberta, Canada
- Height: 6 ft 4 in (193 cm)
- Weight: 195 lb (88 kg; 13 st 13 lb)
- Position: Goaltender
- Catches: Left
- NHL team Former teams: Washington Capitals; Winnipeg Jets
- NHL draft: Undrafted
- Playing career: 2022–present

Clay Stevenson (born March 3, 1999) is a Canadian professional ice hockey player who is a goaltender for the Washington Capitals of the National Hockey League (NHL). After a 30-win season with the BCHL's Coquitlam Express, Stevenson attended Dartmouth College, where, in his sophomore season, he was named to the All-Ivy First Team and as Dartmouth's team MVP. He then signed with the Washington Capitals and debuted for their ECHL associate, the South Carolina Stingrays, in 2022. The following season, he debuted with the Washington Capitals' primary development team, the Hershey Bears in the AHL; that season, he recorded an AHL-leading and franchise rookie record 7 shutouts, appeared at the 2024 AHL All-Star Classic, was named Goaltender of the Month in December, and was a co-recipient of the Harry "Hap" Holmes Memorial Award. Stevenson has also played in the NHL for the Winnipeg Jets.

== Early life ==
Stevenson was born on March 3, 1999, in Drayton Valley, Alberta. He has one older and one younger sister. His parents separated when he was young; he moved to Chilliwack, British Columbia, with his mother, a paramedic named Holly Stevenson, when he was 16. After years of mental health struggles, Holly died by suicide in September 2019. Stevenson credited his mother for supporting his hockey career and pushing him to train as a child, calling her his inspiration to play in the NHL. On his goalie mask, he has his nickname, "Mud", on the front, and a Star of Life on the back as an homage to his mother.

== Playing career ==
=== Youth ===
Stevenson played U15 hockey for the Brazeau Parkland Selects before moving to the KIJHL and playing for the 100 Mile House Wranglers. In 25 games with the Wranglers, he posted a 3.12 goals against average (GAA) and a .907 save percentage (SV%). He played in the KIJHL's Top Prospect's Game.

For the 2017–18 season, Stevenson moved to the BCHL, where he played three seasons with the Coquitlam Express. In his first season, he won just 4 games and lost 16 while recording a 3.89 GAA and a .885 SV%. In the 2018–19 season, he improved his record to 14–11 and lowered his GAA to 3.36. Stevenson had a breakout season in 2019–20, posting a record of 30–2 and leading the Express to the Ron Boileau Memorial Trophy, the BCHL's regular season championship. He led the league in GAA with 1.77 and SV% with .936. He was also named a First Team All-Star, Top Goaltender, and one of the BCHL's Top Goaltending Duo. He was not allowed to participate in the playoffs that year due to an NCAA eligibility rule; in order to maintain his eligibility, he could not play junior hockey after turning 21. Without Stevenson, the Express defeated the Langley Rivermen before the COVID-19 pandemic forced the end of the playoffs.

=== College ===
After leaving the Express, Stevenson went to Dartmouth for the 2020–21 season. He did not appear in any games as a freshman due to COVID-19. He made his collegiate debut in the 2021–22 season against UConn on October 30, saving 34 out of 36 shots in a 1–4 loss. His first win came seven days later against Colgate, winning 3–2 after saving 29 shots. He stopped 37 shots in his first shutout in a game against Yale on February 12. He finished his lone collegiate hockey season with a losing record of 6–14, but a GAA of 2.70 and a SV% of .922. He was named to the All-Ivy First Team and the All-ECAC Hockey Third Team, and was also named Dartmouth's team MVP.

=== Professional ===
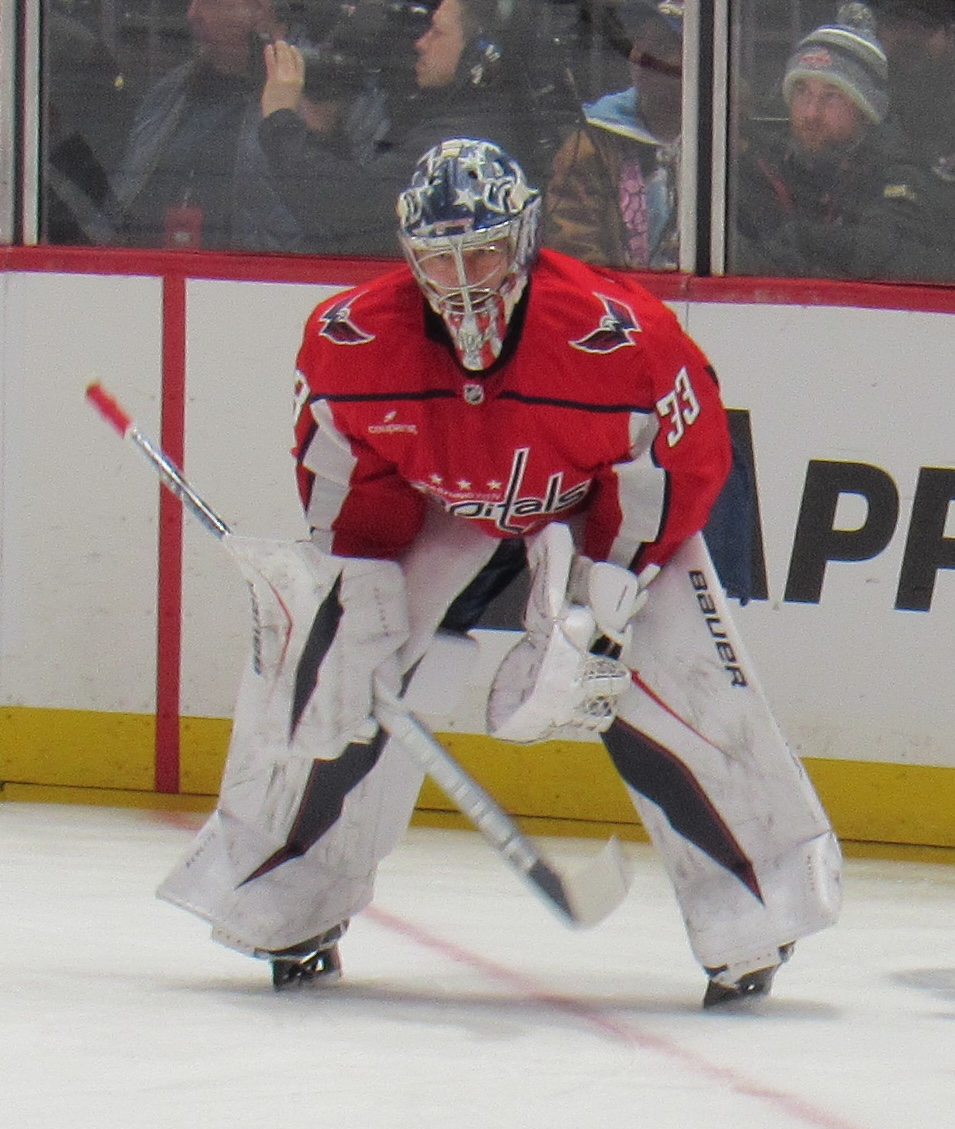
Stevenson with the Capitals in February 2026.

After Stevenson's sophomore season, the Washington Capitals offered him a contract. Following months of deliberation with his coaches at Dartmouth and his agent, he decided to accept the offer and leave college, signing a two-year entry level contract worth $1.85 million on March 28, 2022. He spent most of 2022–23 in the ECHL with the South Carolina Stingrays, a Capitals minor league associate, which he believed was beneficial for his development. Stevenson made his ECHL debut on November 5, 2022, stopping 38 of 40 shots in a 4–2 victory against the Atlanta Gladiators. His first ECHL shutout came on December 3 against the Savannah Ghost Pirates. Stevenson was named ECHL Goaltender of the Week for the week of November 28 – December 4, recording 2 wins, a 0.50 GAA, and a SV% of .984 during that stretch. He finished the season 19–12–3 with a 2.54 GAA and a .916 SV%. He played in five playoff games, where he had a 2-1-2 record with a 2.11 GAA and a .926 SV%. That season, he also made three appearances for the Capitals' AHL associate, the Hershey Bears, posting a 3–0 record with a 1.96 GAA and a .924 SV%.

The Capitals called Stevenson up to the NHL for opening night in October 2023, as starter Darcy Kuemper and AHL starter Hunter Shepard were both unavailable. He did not play in an NHL game, however, and played his first full-time AHL season with the Bears in 2023–24. The Capitals resigned him with a 3-year contract worth $2.325 million in December 2023. Backing up Hunter Shepard for the Hershey Bears, Stevenson finished with a record of 24–10–2, a GAA of 2.06, which was second only to Shepard in the AHL, and a SV% of .922. He tied the Bears' franchise record for shutouts and set the Bears rookie record for shutouts with seven, which also led all AHL goalies. He also set the Bears' record for GAA, surpassing Pheonix Copley's 2.17 GAA from the 2014–15 season. He was named AHL Goaltender of the Month in December 2023 and joined fellow Bears players Ethen Frank and Dylan McIlrath at the 2024 AHL All-Star Classic in February 2024. Stevenson and Shepard combined for 11 shutouts during the season, a Hershey Bears record, and received the Harry "Hap" Holmes Memorial Award as the pair that allowed the lowest GAA of the season. During the playoffs that year, Stevenson mainly acted as a backup for Shepard, playing in just 2 games and recording 9 saves out of 10 as the Hershey Bears went on to win their second consecutive Calder Cup.

Stevenson made his NHL debut for the Capitals on April 17, 2025, facing the Pittsburgh Penguins. He allowed five goals on 38 shots in a 2–5 defeat. Despite the loss, the Capitals head coach Spencer Carbery described Stevenson's performance as "fantastic". On February 11, 2026, Stevenson was sent back down to the Hershey Bears.

On September 28, 2026 Stevenson was claimed off waivers by the Winnipeg Jets. After five games with Winnipeg, Stevenson was waived again on November 20, and subsequently re-claimed by the Capitals the following day.

== Career statistics ==
			Regular season									Playoffs
Season	Team	League	GP	W	L	OT	MIN	GA	SO	GAA	SV%	GP	W	L	MIN	GA	SO	GAA	SV%
2012–13	Brazeau Parkland Selects U15 AA	NAHL U15	10	—	—	—	—	—	—	7.41	.846	—	—	—	—	—	—	—	—
2013–14	Brazeau Parkland Selects U15 AA	NAHL U15	15	—	—	—	—	—	—	5.02	.900	—	—	—	—	—	—	—	—
2015–16	Chilliwack Chiefs U18 A1	U18 A1	—	—	—	—	—	—	—	—	—	—	—	—	—	—	—	—	—
2016–17	100 Mile House Wranglers	KIJHL	25	—	—	—	—	—	—	3.12	.907	—	—	—	—	—	—	—	—
2017–18	Coquitlam Express	BCHL	23	4	16	0	1219	79	0	3.89	.885	3	0	1	91	3	0	1.99	.961
2018–19	Coquitlam Express	BCHL	27	14	11	1	1608	90	2	3.36	.889	3	1	2	178	7	1	2.36	.929
2019–20	Coquitlam Express	BCHL	35	30	2	2	2067	61	4	1.77	.936	—	—	—	—	—	—	—	—
2021–22	Dartmouth College	ECAC	23	6	14	2	1334	60	2	2.70	.922	—	—	—	—	—	—	—	—
2022–23	South Carolina Stingrays	ECHL	36	19	12	3	2056	87	3	2.54	.916	5	2	3	312	11	1	2.11	.926
2022–23	Hershey Bears	AHL	3	3	0	0	183	6	0	1.96	.924	—	—	—	—	—	—	—	—
2023–24	Hershey Bears	AHL	36	24	10	2	2159	74	7	2.06	.922	2	0	0	32	1	0	1.86	.900
2024–25	Hershey Bears	AHL	33	18	8	4	1838	90	2	2.94	.888	1	1	0	60	4	0	4.00	.875
2024–25	Washington Capitals	NHL	1	0	1	0	60	5	0	5.00	.868	—	—	—	—	—	—	—	—
2025–26	Washington Capitals	NHL	4	3	1	0	239	8	0	2.00	.921	—	—	—	—	—	—	—	—
2025–26	Hershey Bears	AHL	37	18	13	3	2087	91	0	2.62	.912	6	3	3	362	13	1	2.15	.921
2026–27	Winnipeg Jets	NHL	5	1	3	0	266	16	0	3.61	.870	—	—	—	—	—	—	—	—
NHL totals			10	4	5	0	566	29	0	3.08	.889	—	—	—	—	—	—	—	—

== Awards and honours ==
Award	Year
BCHL
First Team All-Star	2020
Top Goaltender	2020
Wally Forslund Memorial Trophy	2020
College
ECAC All-Rookie Team	2022
ECAC Third All-Star Team	2022
All-Ivy League First Team	2022
AHL
All-Star Game	2024
Harry "Hap" Holmes Memorial Award	2024
Calder Cup	2024
