= Ahac (surname) =

Ahac is a surname. Notable people with the surname include:

- Dušan Pirjevec Ahac (born 1921), Slovenian partisan
- Layton Ahac (born 2001), Canadian ice hockey defenceman
