= Kent Johnson (ice hockey) =

Canadian ice hockey player (born 2002)

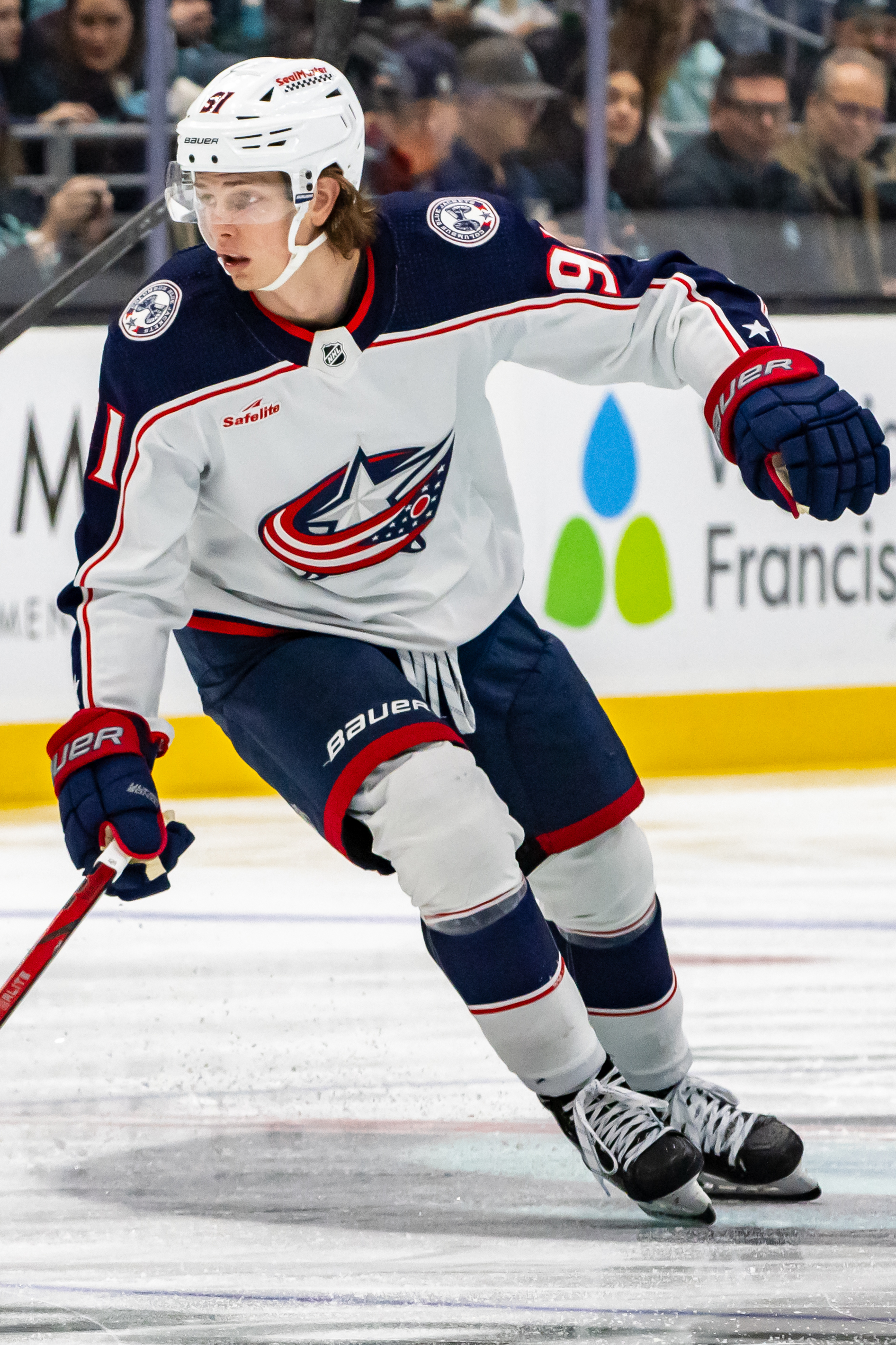
- Johnson with the Blue Jackets in 2024
- Born: October 18, 2002 (age 24) Port Moody, British Columbia, Canada
- Height: 6 ft 0 in (183 cm)
- Weight: 175 lb (79 kg; 12 st 7 lb)
- Position: Forward
- Shoots: Left
- NHL team: Columbus Blue Jackets
- National team: Canada
- NHL draft: 5th overall, 2021; Columbus Blue Jackets
- Playing career: 2022–present

Kent Johnson (born October 18, 2002) is a Canadian professional ice hockey player who is a forward for the Columbus Blue Jackets of the National Hockey League (NHL). He played college ice hockey for the Michigan Wolverines. He was selected fifth overall by the Blue Jackets in the 2021 NHL entry draft.

== Playing career ==
=== Junior ===
During the 2018–19 season in his first season with the Trail Smoke Eaters of the British Columbia Hockey League (BCHL), Johnson recorded 20 goals and 26 points in 57 games. During the 2019–20 season, he recorded 41 goals and 60 assists in 52 games and won the Brett Hull Trophy as the league's leading scorer. Following an outstanding season, he was named BCHL First-Team All-Star, BCHL Most Sportsmanlike Player, BCHL Most Valuable Player, and Canadian Junior Hockey League Forward of the Year.

=== Collegiate ===
Johnson began his collegiate career for the Michigan Wolverines during the 2020–21 season. On January 8, 2021, Johnson recorded a career-high five points in a game against the Michigan State Spartans. He became the first Michigan player to record five points in a game since J. T. Compher on March 18, 2016. He was subsequently named the Big Ten Conference First Star of the Week for the week ending January 13, 2021. He finished his freshman season with nine goals and 18 assists in 26 games. He ranked second in rookie scoring in the Big Ten Conference and third in the nation in rookie points per game. Following the season, he was named to the All-Big Ten Freshman Team.

During the 2021–22 season in his sophomore year, he recorded eight goals and 29 assists in 32 games. He finished fourth in the nation in assists per game and ranked 16th in points per game.

=== Professional ===
On July 23, 2021, Johnson was selected in the first round, fifth overall, by the Columbus Blue Jackets in the 2021 NHL entry draft. On April 8, 2022, Johnson signed a three-year, entry-level contract with the Blue Jackets. He made his NHL debut on April 13, 2022, in a game against the Montreal Canadiens. He finished the 2021–22 season with three assists in nine games. Johnson scored his first career NHL goal on October 22, 2022, against Tristan Jarry of the Pittsburgh Penguins.

On July 27, 2024, the Blue Jackets signed Johnson to a three-year, $5.4 million contract extension with an annual average of $1.8 million.

== International play ==
Medal record

Representing Canada

Ice hockey

World Championships
Silver medal – second place	2022 Finland	

World Junior Championships
Gold medal – first place	2022 Canada	

On July 21, 2021, Johnson was selected to attend Canada's National Junior Team summer development camp. On January 25, 2022, Johnson was named to Team Canada's roster as an alternate to represent Canada at the 2022 Winter Olympics. He recorded one goal and four assists in five games during the tournament.

On May 9, 2022, Johnson was named to Canada's roster to compete at the 2022 IIHF World Championship. When he scored a goal in Canada's Group A first preliminary round game, he became the fourth player in history to score at least one goal at the World Juniors, Olympics, and Worlds in the same season. The others to accomplish this feat were Saku Koivu (1993–94), Evgeni Malkin (2005–06), and Eeli Tolvanen (2017–18). He recorded four goals and three assists in ten games and won a silver medal.

He represented Canada at the 2022 World Junior Ice Hockey Championships, where he recorded three goals and six assists in seven games. He scored the game-winning overtime goal to help Canada win gold.

== Personal life ==
Johnson was born to Jay and Anita Johnson. He has Finnish roots as his mother is originally from Finland and moved to Vancouver at the age of two. Kent, however, does not speak Finnish. His brother, Kyle, played hockey for the Yale Bulldogs from 2018 to 2022. Johnson is a devout Christian.

== Career statistics ==
=== Regular season and playoffs ===
			Regular season					Playoffs
Season	Team	League	GP	G	A	Pts	PIM	GP	G	A	Pts	PIM
2018–19	Trail Smoke Eaters	BCHL	57	20	26	46	24	12	7	5	12	4
2019–20	Trail Smoke Eaters	BCHL	52	41	60	101	14	4	1	6	7	2
2020–21	University of Michigan	B1G	26	9	18	27	4	—	—	—	—	—
2021–22	University of Michigan	B1G	32	8	29	37	6	—	—	—	—	—
2021–22	Columbus Blue Jackets	NHL	9	0	3	3	2	—	—	—	—	—
2022–23	Columbus Blue Jackets	NHL	79	16	24	40	14	—	—	—	—	—
2023–24	Columbus Blue Jackets	NHL	42	6	10	16	10	—	—	—	—	—
2023–24	Cleveland Monsters	AHL	10	5	10	15	0	—	—	—	—	—
2024–25	Columbus Blue Jackets	NHL	68	24	33	57	16	—	—	—	—	—
2025–26	Columbus Blue Jackets	NHL	76	7	15	22	20	—	—	—	—	—
NHL totals			274	53	83	138	62	—	—	—	—	—

=== International ===
Year	Team	Event	Result	GP	G	A	Pts	PIM
2022	Canada	WJC	1st place, gold medalist(s)	7	3	6	9	2
2022	Canada	OG	6th	5	1	4	5	0
2022	Canada	WC	2nd place, silver medalist(s)	10	4	3	7	0
2025	Canada	WC	5th	8	2	1	3	0
Junior totals				7	3	6	9	2
Senior totals				23	7	8	15	0

== Awards and honours ==
Award	Year
College
All-Big Ten Freshman Team	2021

Awards and achievements
Preceded by Egor Chinakhov	Columbus Blue Jackets first-round draft pick 2021	Succeeded by Cole Sillinger
