= Alex Newhook =

Canadian ice hockey player (born 2001)

- Born: January 28, 2001 (age 25) St. John's, Newfoundland and Labrador, Canada
- Height: 5 ft 11 in (180 cm)
- Weight: 200 lb (91 kg; 14 st 4 lb)
- Position: Centre
- Shoots: Left
- NHL team Former teams: Montreal Canadiens; Colorado Avalanche
- NHL draft: 16th overall, 2019; Colorado Avalanche
- Playing career: 2021–present

Alex Newhook (born January 28, 2001) is a Canadian professional ice hockey player who is a centre for the Montreal Canadiens of the National Hockey League (NHL). He was selected in the first round, 16th overall, by the Colorado Avalanche in the 2019 NHL entry draft and won the Stanley Cup with the Avalanche in 2022, becoming the third player from Newfoundland and Labrador to do so, following Daniel Cleary (2008) and Michael Ryder (2011).

== Playing career ==
=== Early years ===
As a youth, Newhook left his native Newfoundland to play hockey for St. Andrew's College, a boarding school located in Aurora, Ontario. Thereafter, he joined the York Simcoe Express of the Eastern AAA Hockey League (ETAHL) where he served as team captain and was named as the U16 AAA Player of the Year across the Ontario Minor Hockey Association (OMHA) in 2017.

=== Junior ===
Newhook joined the Victoria Grizzlies of the British Columbia Hockey League (BCHL) for the 2017–18 season where he finished second in team scoring with 66 points in 45 games played. He also recorded nine points through 12 playoff games and was named as team captain thereafter.

Early into the 2018–19 season, Newhook signed his Letter of Intent to join Boston College of the National Collegiate Athletic Association (NCAA) beginning in the 2019–20 NCAA season. After leading all BCHL skaters in scoring during his final year, he earned the Vern Dye Memorial Award as the league's most valuable player (MVP). Similarly, he was also recognized as the MVP across the Canadian Junior Hockey League (CJHL). Following the season, Newhook was selected in the first round, 16th overall, by the Colorado Avalanche in the 2019 NHL entry draft.

=== College ===
Newhook had an impressive freshman campaign with the Boston College Eagles, posting 19 goals and 23 assists for 42 points in 34 games. Collectively, he led all Hockey East freshmen in points and goals, all NCAA freshman in goals, and tied for seventh in scoring among all NCAA skaters. For his efforts, Newhook was named recipient of the Tim Taylor Award, becoming the first such player in Boston College history, as well as the Hockey East Rookie of the Year. He likewise earned Hockey East Second Team All-Star honors and would be named to the conference All-Rookie Team.

Due to participation in the 2021 World Juniors tournament and underlying quarantine requirements prior thereto, Newhook missed the start of his sophomore campaign at Boston College. After returning to campus following a silver medal result with Team Canada, he was injured in his Eagles season debut. Collectively, Newhook would be limited to just 12 games over the course of the 2020–21 season, posting a total seven goals and 16 points.

=== Professional ===
==== Colorado Avalanche (2021–2023) ====
On March 31, 2021, Newhook ended his collegiate career by agreeing to a three-year entry-level contract with the Colorado Avalanche. He was initially assigned by the Avalanche to begin his professional career with their American Hockey League (AHL) affiliate, the Colorado Eagles. After producing at the AHL level, collecting five goals and nine points through eight games played, Newhook was called up to the Avalanche's taxi squad on May 2, 2021. He made his NHL debut three days later in a 3–2 loss to the San Jose Sharks. Appearing in six total games with the Avalanche during the 2020–21 season, he scored his first NHL goal in the ensuing Stanley Cup playoffs during game three of the team's opening round series against the St. Louis Blues on May 21. He ultimately skated in eight playoff games before Colorado was ousted in the second round by the Vegas Golden Knights.

Securing an opening night roster spot ahead of the 2021–22 season, team head coach Jared Bednar would reassign Newhook to the Eagles after a single game, citing his need for "more confidence with the puck." Returning to the NHL ranks after ten games, he would register 33 points over the remainder of the regular season. After sporadic use in the Avalanche's first and second round series against the Nashville Predators and St. Louis Blues, Newhook then played the entirety of the Western Conference Final against the Edmonton Oilers and the championship-clinching Stanley Cup Final over the Tampa Bay Lightning. He finished the postseason with four assists in 12 games. With the Avalanche's victory, he became the third player from Newfoundland and Labrador to win the Stanley Cup, following Daniel Cleary (2008) and Michael Ryder (2011).

The 2022–23 season was poised at the outset to be a significant opportunity for Newhook, as the departure of longtime second line centreman Nazem Kadri left a positional vacancy that the team would give him the opportunity to fill. Newhook later said that the departing Kadri had encouraged him of his ability to handle this task. He soon experienced difficulties in this endeavour, not aided by an array of injuries to other Avalanche players, and was soon supplanted by J.T. Compher. As well, coach Bednar frequently preferred to play him as a winger. On December 5, Newhook skated in his 100th career NHL game, a 5–3 loss to the Philadelphia Flyers, scoring a goal. He finished the regular season with 14 goals and 16 assists in 82 games. The Avalanche were unexpectedly upset in the first round of the 2023 Stanley Cup playoffs by the Seattle Kraken, with Newhook registering only one assist in seven games and seeing his ice-time decline. By season's end, it was widely assessed that he had not been able to take the next step the team had been hoping he would, raising questions as to his future with the Avalanche. Newhook himself would subsequently say "there were times that I maybe could have got a bit more opportunity and definitely could have done better with the opportunity I was given at times. For whatever reason, I didn't have as good a year as I wanted to."

==== Montreal Canadiens (2023–present) ====
As a pending restricted free agent following the conclusion of his entry-level contract with the Avalanche, Newhook was traded to the Montreal Canadiens on June 27, 2023, in exchange for both a first and second round pick in 2023 and prospect Gianni Fairbrother. The trade reunited him with his former agent, Kent Hughes, who was now serving as the team's general manager. On July 11, 2023, Newhook was signed by the Canadiens to a four-year, $11.6 million contract extension.

Newhook played his first game with the Canadiens on October 11, 2023, scoring two goals in their season opener against the Toronto Maple Leafs. Initially, he had been placed on their second line with Kirby Dach and Juraj Slafkovský, a pairing that received strong initial assessments prior to the former sustaining a long-term injury in only the second game of the 2023–24 campaign. As a result, head coach Martin St. Louis announced that Newhook would be shifted back to the centre position to replace Dach. After struggling with this assignment, Newhook would be placed back to the wing following the return of Christian Dvorak to the lineup in early November. Enjoying more success in that role, he registered seven goals and six assists, ranking fourth on the team in points, before sustaining a high ankle sprain in a November 30 game against the Florida Panthers which resulted in a prolonged absence. After missing 27 games, Newhook returned to the ice in a February 10 game versus the Dallas Stars. The remainder of the season saw him reach new career milestones, first skating in his 200th career NHL game on March 19, and then recording his 100th career NHL point on April 16 against the Detroit Red Wings.

In the early stages of the 2025–26 season, Newhook collected 12 points (six goals, six assists) through 17 games before fracturing his ankle after hitting the boards feet-first during a matchup versus the Dallas Stars on November 13. Following surgery, he was expected to miss four months of action. He subsequently returned to the lineup on February 26, managing an assist in an overtime loss to the New York Islanders. After finishing the regular season with 13 goals and 12 assists in 42 games, Newhook scored the series-winning goal in Game 7 of the Canadiens' first round matchup of the 2026 Stanley Cup playoffs against the Tampa Bay Lightning, giving the team their first playoff series victory in five years. With consecutive multi-goal efforts against the Buffalo Sabres in Games 2 and 3 of the second round, he became the first Canadiens skater to achieve this postseason feat since Mark Recchi in 1997. Securing the overtime winner versus the Sabres on May 18, Newhook joined Nathan Horton (2011) as the only player in league history with multiple series-clinching goals in Game 7 during a single postseason, while also becoming the first in Canadiens franchise history to score an overtime goal on the road in a Game 7 situation. The Canadiens were ultimately defeated by the Carolina Hurricanes in the Eastern Conference final, with Newhook contributing a total of seven goals and three assists across 19 playoff games.

Entering the final season of his contract, Newhook agreed to a four-year, $22.2 million extension with the Canadiens on September 15, 2026.

== International play ==
Medal record

Representing Canada

Men's ice hockey

World Junior Championships
Silver medal – second place	2021 Canada	

World Junior A Challenge
Bronze medal – third place	2018 Canada	

Internationally, Newhook firstly represented Hockey Canada as part of team Canada Black at the 2017 World U-17 Hockey Challenge. The following year, he participated in the annual World Junior A Challenge earning a bronze medal along with team Canada West. Newhook was then named to the national under-18 team for the 2019 IIHF World U18 Championships where he shared Canada’s scoring lead (10 points) along with teammate Peyton Krebs despite their country being unable to secure a podium finish.

In December 2020, Newhook was selected to the national junior team for the World Junior Championships held in Edmonton, Alberta. He recorded three goals and registered six points at the tournament, helping Canada capture silver after falling to rival United States whom featured fellow Boston College linemate Matthew Boldy as well as Eagles goaltender Spencer Knight.

== Personal life ==
Newhook was born to parents Paula and Shawn in St. John's, Newfoundland and Labrador and began skating at the age of 4. As a child, he idolized fellow Newfoundlander and Stanley Cup champion Daniel Cleary, describing him as "a guy that I...dreamt of being like him when I grew up."

His younger sister, Abby, is also a professional hockey player, signing with the Boston Fleet of the Professional Women's Hockey League (PWHL) for the 2025–26 season. In a questionnaire for the NHL, he responded to the prompt "not a lot of people know that I..." with: "have a sister who is better than me at hockey." She initially played at Tabor Academy as well as for the Bay State Breakers, before, like her brother, joining the Boston College Eagles.

During his time at St. Andrew's College, Newhook played the trombone, winning a national band competition during his tenth grade year.

== Career statistics ==
=== Regular season and playoffs ===
			Regular season					Playoffs
Season	Team	League	GP	G	A	Pts	PIM	GP	G	A	Pts	PIM
2015–16	St. Andrew's College	CAHS	11	2	5	7	2	—	—	—	—	—
2016–17	St. Andrew's College	CAHS	4	2	0	2	0	—	—	—	—	—
2016–17	York Simcoe Express	ETAHL	33	43	31	74	14	7	1	7	8	2
2016–17	Aurora Tigers	OJHL	1	0	1	1	10	—	—	—	—	—
2017–18	Victoria Grizzlies	BCHL	45	22	44	66	10	12	3	6	9	8
2018–19	Victoria Grizzlies	BCHL	52	38	64	102	21	15	11	13	24	2
2019–20	Boston College	HE	34	19	23	42	8	—	—	—	—	—
2020–21	Boston College	HE	12	7	9	16	8	—	—	—	—	—
2020–21	Colorado Eagles	AHL	8	5	4	9	4	—	—	—	—	—
2020–21	Colorado Avalanche	NHL	6	0	3	3	2	8	1	1	2	2
2021–22	Colorado Avalanche	NHL	71	13	20	33	12	12	0	4	4	4
2021–22	Colorado Eagles	AHL	10	4	7	11	2	—	—	—	—	—
2022–23	Colorado Avalanche	NHL	82	14	16	30	22	7	0	1	1	4
2023–24	Montreal Canadiens	NHL	55	15	19	34	18	—	—	—	—	—
2024–25	Montreal Canadiens	NHL	82	15	11	26	24	5	1	1	2	4
2025–26	Montreal Canadiens	NHL	42	13	12	25	10	19	7	3	10	16
NHL totals			338	70	81	151	88	51	9	10	19	30

=== International ===
Year	Team	Event	Result	GP	G	A	Pts	PIM
2017	Canada Black	U17	7th	5	1	3	4	4
2018	Canada West	WJAC	3rd place, bronze medalist(s)	6	0	4	4	0
2019	Canada	U18	4th	7	5	5	10	0
2021	Canada	WJC	2nd place, silver medalist(s)	6	3	3	6	2
Junior totals				24	9	15	24	6

== Awards and honours ==
Award	Year	Ref
OMHA
ETA Player of the Year	2017	
BCHL
All-Rookie Team	2018	
First Team All-Star	2018, 2019	
Bruce Allison Memorial Trophy	2018	
Vern Dye Memorial Trophy	2019	
CJHL
Top Rookie	2018	
Top Forward	2019	
Most Valuable Player	2019	
John Grisdale Top Prospects Award	2019	
College
Hockey East All-Rookie Team	2020	
Hockey East Rookie of the Year	2020	
Hockey East Second Team	2020	
New England D1 All-Stars	2020	
New England Rookie of the Year	2020	
Tim Taylor Award	2020	
All-USCHO Second Team	2020	
NHL
Stanley Cup champion	2022	

Awards and achievements
Preceded by Bowen Byram	Colorado Avalanche first-round draft pick 2019	Succeeded by Justin Barron
Preceded by Joel Farabee	Hockey East Rookie of the Year; 2019–20	Succeeded by Josh Lopina; Nikita Nesterenko
Preceded by Joel Farabee	Tim Taylor Award; 2019–20	Succeeded by Thomas Bordeleau
