= Mike Hardman =

American ice hockey player (born 1999)

- Born: February 5, 1999 (age 27) Hanover, Massachusetts, U.S.
- Height: 6 ft 2 in (188 cm)
- Weight: 205 lb (93 kg; 14 st 9 lb)
- Position: Left wing
- Shoots: Left
- SHL team Former teams: HV71; Chicago Blackhawks; New Jersey Devils
- NHL draft: Undrafted
- Playing career: 2021–present

Mike Hardman (born February 5, 1999) is an American professional ice hockey forward who is currently under contract with HV71 of the Swedish Hockey League (SHL).

== Playing career ==
Hardman played two seasons for the Boston College Eagles before signing as an undrafted free agent to an entry-level contract with the Chicago Blackhawks on March 30, 2021.

Immediately joining the Blackhawks roster for the remainder of the 2020–21 season, Hardman made his NHL debut with Chicago against the Tampa Bay Lightning on April 27, 2021. In his fifth game, Hardman recorded his first NHL goal and point, scoring against Petr Mrázek of the Carolina Hurricanes in a 6–3 defeat on May 4, 2021.

On July 1, 2024, the opening day of free agency, Hardman signed a two-year, two-way contract with the New Jersey Devils.

Having concluded his tenure with the Devils, Hardman left as a free agent and opted to sign his first contract abroad in agreeing to a one-year deal with Swedish club, HV71 of the SHL, on August 25, 2026.

== Career statistics ==
| | | | Regular season | | | | | Playoffs |
| Season | Team | League | GP | G | A | Pts | PIM | GP | G | A | Pts | PIM |
|---|---|---|---|---|---|---|---|---|---|---|---|---|
| 2015–16 | The Winchendon School | USHS | 28 | 4 | 17 | 21 | — | — | — | — | — | — |
| 2016–17 | The Winchendon School | USHS | 28 | 24 | 30 | 54 | — | — | — | — | — | — |
| 2017–18 | Des Moines Buccaneers | USHL | 56 | 10 | 13 | 23 | 50 | — | — | — | — | — |
| 2018–19 | West Kelowna Warriors | BCHL | 58 | 39 | 33 | 72 | 16 | 4 | 2 | 0 | 2 | 2 |
| 2019–20 | Boston College | HE | 34 | 12 | 13 | 25 | 10 | — | — | — | — | — |
| 2020–21 | Boston College | HE | 24 | 10 | 9 | 19 | 14 | — | — | — | — | — |
| 2020–21 | Chicago Blackhawks | NHL | 8 | 1 | 2 | 3 | 0 | — | — | — | — | — |
| 2021–22 | Rockford IceHogs | AHL | 43 | 19 | 13 | 32 | 8 | 5 | 0 | 0 | 0 | 2 |
| 2021–22 | Chicago Blackhawks | NHL | 21 | 0 | 2 | 2 | 11 | — | — | — | — | — |
| 2022–23 | Rockford IceHogs | AHL | 58 | 5 | 13 | 18 | 36 | 5 | 0 | 0 | 0 | 2 |
| 2022–23 | Chicago Blackhawks | NHL | 8 | 0 | 0 | 0 | 0 | — | — | — | — | — |
| 2023–24 | Rockford IceHogs | AHL | 63 | 22 | 15 | 37 | 23 | 4 | 2 | 2 | 4 | 2 |
| 2024–25 | Utica Comets | AHL | 57 | 18 | 17 | 35 | 18 | — | — | — | — | — |
| 2024–25 | New Jersey Devils | NHL | 2 | 0 | 1 | 1 | 0 | — | — | — | — | — |
| 2025–26 | Utica Comets | AHL | 58 | 10 | 11 | 21 | 12 | — | — | — | — | — |
| NHL totals | | | 39 | 1 | 5 | 6 | 11 | — | — | — | — | — |

== Awards and honors ==
| Award | Year |
BCHL
| Second All-Star Team | 2019 |
| Bob Fenton Trophy (Most Sportsmanlike) | 2019 |
