= Jasper Weatherby =

American ice hockey player

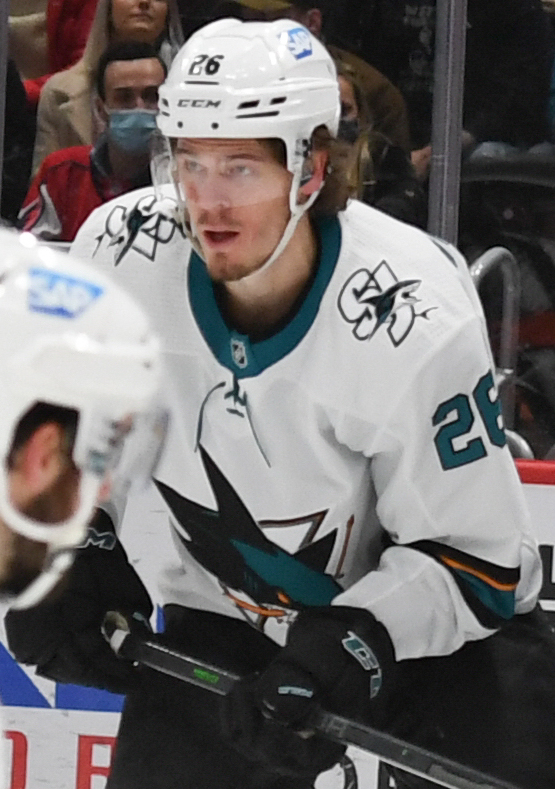
- Weatherby with the San Jose Sharks in 2022
- Born: January 22, 1998 (age 28) Portland, Oregon, US
- Height: 6 ft 4 in (193 cm)
- Weight: 202 lb (92 kg; 14 st 6 lb)
- Position: Center/Left wing
- Shoots: Left
- ELH team Former teams: HC Bílí Tygři Liberec; San Jose Sharks; Grand Rapids Griffins; Milwaukee Admirals; HC Dynamo Pardubice
- NHL draft: 102nd overall, 2018; San Jose Sharks
- Playing career: 2021–present

Jasper Weatherby (born January 22, 1998) is an American professional ice hockey forward who currently plays for Bílí Tygři Liberec of the Czech Extraliga (ELH). He was selected by the San Jose Sharks in the 2018 NHL entry draft and made his NHL debut in 2021.

== Early life ==
Weatherby was born in Portland, Oregon to parents Richard Weatherby and Lucinda Moeglein. He comes from Jewish descent, as his Jewish grandfather fled the Nazis from London, England. While both of his grandparents became civil right lawyers, his mother attended various civil rights protests during the Civil rights movement. Weatherby also grew up alongside his adopted brother Kevin, who the family took in when he was eight years old.

== Playing career ==
=== BCHL ===
Although Weatherby was born in Portland, his family moved to a ranch in Ashland, Oregon when he was a toddler. He remained in Oregon until he was 14 years old when he left to play at the Canadian International Hockey Academy from 2012 to 2014. In his final season at the academy, a broken leg caused Weatherby to miss most of the 2014–15 season. From there, he spent two seasons with the Omaha AAA Lancers while attending Douglas County West High School but was unable to earn a long-term contract with several other junior teams upon graduating in 2016. Weatherby eventually earned a tryout with the Wenatchee Wild of the British Columbia Hockey League (BCHL) and played under coach Bliss Littler from 2016 to 2018. While playing under Littler, Weatherby helped lead the Wild to the 2018 BCHL Championship and a berth in the RBC Cup semifinals. In November 2017, Weatherby announce his commitment to join the North Dakota Fighting Hawks in the National Collegiate Hockey Conference (NCHC) in 2018.

Following his final season in the BCHL, Weatherby was ranked 198th amongst North American skaters by the NHL Central Scouting Bureau. Weatherby immediately enrolled in some University of North Dakota summer classes and began taking part in their offseason training program. He was eventually drafted by the San Jose Sharks in the fourth round, 102nd overall, of the 2018 NHL entry draft.

=== College ===
Following the draft, Weatherby played collegiate hockey with the North Dakota Fighting Hawks in the NCHC from 2018 to 2021 while majoring in marketing. In his first season with the Hawks, Weatherby registered three goals and two assists through 36 games. He tallied his first collegiate goal in a 6–2 loss to the Western Michigan Broncos on November 17, 2018. The Fighting Hawks finished 5th in the 8th place NCHC standings before being swept by Denver in the first round of the NCHC Playoffs.

Weatherby improved offensively during the shortened 2019–20 NCHC season and finished with 10 goals and eight assists through 35 games. By November 2019, Weatherby had collected two goals and two assists while also leading the team in faceoff win percentage through the first nine games of the season. His offensive talent helped lead the Fighting Hawks to the 2019 Penrose Cup as the NCHC's regular-season champions.

=== Professional ===
Following his Junior season, Weatherby concluded his collegiate career by signing a two-year entry-level contract with the Sharks on August 24, 2021

In his first professional season, Weatherby made the 2021–22 opening night roster with the Sharks. He made his NHL debut on October 16, 2021, in a 4–3 win over the Winnipeg Jets, where he also scored his first goal. In making an immediate impact with the Sharks, Weatherby added 5 goals and 11 points through 50 regular season games before finishing the season re-assigned to AHL affiliate, the San Jose Barracuda.

After attending the Sharks training camp in preparation for the 2022–23 season, Weatherby failed to make the opening night roster and was assigned to continue his development in the AHL. Weatherby registered just 3 goals and 6 points through 39 games with the Barracuda before he was traded by the Sharks to the Detroit Red Wings in exchange for Kyle Criscuolo on January 18, 2023.

As a pending restricted free agent, Weatherby was not tendered a qualifying offer by the Red Wings to release him as a free agent. On July 3, 2023, he was signed to a one-year, two-way contract with the Nashville Predators.

After a lone season with the Predators AHL affiliate, the Milwaukee Admirals, Weatherby went un-signed over the summer as a free agent. Approaching the 2024–25 season, he accepted an invitation to attend the training camp of the Edmonton Oilers on a professional tryout on September 19 2024. During the pre-season, Weatherby was released by the Oilers, however, he remained within the organization on an AHL contract with their affiliate, the Bakersfield Condors, on September 26, 2024.

On October 24, 2024, Weatherby signed with Czech Extraliga club HC Dynamo Pardubice for the remainder of the 2024-25 season with an option for another season.

== Career statistics ==
			Regular season					Playoffs
Season	Team	League	GP	G	A	Pts	PIM	GP	G	A	Pts	PIM
2016–17	Wenatchee Wild	BCHL	46	12	20	32	25	10	2	2	4	4
2017–18	Wenatchee Wild	BCHL	58	37	37	74	47	20	15	23	38	8
2018–19	U. of North Dakota	NCHC	36	3	2	5	32	—	—	—	—	—
2019–20	U. of North Dakota	NCHC	35	10	8	18	20	—	—	—	—	—
2020–21	U. of North Dakota	NCHC	29	14	10	24	8	—	—	—	—	—
2021–22	San Jose Sharks	NHL	50	5	6	11	18	—	—	—	—	—
2021–22	San Jose Barracuda	AHL	25	5	10	15	24	—	—	—	—	—
2022–23	San Jose Barracuda	AHL	39	3	3	6	39	—	—	—	—	—
2022–23	Grand Rapids Griffins	AHL	31	3	8	11	12	—	—	—	—	—
2023–24	Milwaukee Admirals	AHL	66	12	13	25	38	13	1	2	3	22
2024–25	HC Dynamo Pardubice	ELH	16	1	1	2	12	5	2	1	3	0
2024–25	HC Bílí Tygři Liberec	ELH	15	4	5	9	4	—	—	—	—	—
NHL totals			50	5	6	11	18	—	—	—	—	—

== Awards and honours ==
Award	Year
BCHL
First All-Star Team	2018
Vern Dye Memorial Trophy (MVP)	2018
Brett Hull Trophy (Top Scorer)	2018
NCHC
NCHC Academic All-Conference Team	2019, 2020, 2021
NCHC Player of the Month	February 2021
