= Layton Ahac =

Canadian ice hockey player (born 2001)

- Born: February 22, 2001 (age 25) North Vancouver, British Columbia, Canada
- Height: 6 ft 2 in (188 cm)
- Weight: 205 lb (93 kg; 14 st 9 lb)
- Position: Defence
- Shoots: Left
- ELH team Former teams: HC Bílí Tygři Liberec; Henderson Silver Knights; Abbotsford Canucks
- NHL draft: 86th overall, 2019; Vegas Golden Knights
- Playing career: 2021–present

Layton Ahac (born Feb 22, 2001) is a Canadian professional ice hockey defenceman currently playing for HC Bílí Tygři Liberec of the Czech Extraliga (ELH). He previously played junior hockey with the Prince George Spruce Kings of the British Columbia Hockey League (BCHL), as well as NCAA collegiate hockey with the Ohio State Buckeyes.

== Playing career ==
After a short stint with the U18-level Vancouver North West Giants of the BC Hockey Major Midget League (BCEHL), Ahac entered junior hockey with the Prince George Spruce Kings of the British Columbia Hockey League (BCHL). In his two years with Prince George, Ahac was named to the BCHL All-Rookie Team for 2017–18, and the Second All-Star Team for 2018–19, helping the Spruce Kings to a Fred Page Cup championship in 2019.

Ahac was selected 86th overall in the third round of the 2019 NHL entry draft by the Vegas Golden Knights. He then played two seasons of collegiate hockey at Ohio State University, whom he had committed to in 2017.

Ahac signed his three-year entry-level contract with Vegas on March 30, 2021, joining their American Hockey League (AHL) affiliate, the Henderson Silver Knights, shortly thereafter.

At the conclusion of his entry-level contract with the Golden Knights, having played exclusively in the AHL with the Silver Knights, Ahac was not tendered a qualifying offer to be retained by Vegas and was released as a free agent. On July 23, 2024, Ahac agreed to terms to continue his career in the AHL, after signing a one-year contract with the Abbotsford Canucks, affiliate to the Vancouver Canucks, for the 2024–25 season. Due to injury, Ahac made just 4 appearances for Abbotsford before he was released from his contract on January 15, 2025; two days later, on January 17, he signed a one-year contract with HC Bílí Tygři Liberec of the Czech Extraliga, joining them for the remainder of the 2024–25 season.

== International play ==
Ahac appeared for the Canada West team at the 2018 World Junior A Challenge, recording two points in six games.

== Career statistics ==
=== Regular season and playoffs ===
			Regular season					Playoffs
Season	Team	League	GP	G	A	Pts	PIM	GP	G	A	Pts	PIM
2017–18	Prince George Spruce Kings	BCHL	57	6	23	29	28	24	1	4	5	6
2018–19	Prince George Spruce Kings	BCHL	53	4	28	32	30	17	5	12	17	6
2019–20	Ohio State University	B1G	36	0	3	3	25	–	–	–	–	–
2020–21	Ohio State University	B1G	27	1	8	9	21	–	–	–	–	–
2020–21	Henderson Silver Knights	AHL	13	0	2	2	4	1	0	0	0	0
2021–22	Henderson Silver Knights	AHL	32	0	6	6	8	2	1	0	1	2
2022–23	Henderson Silver Knights	AHL	34	1	3	4	16	–	–	–	–	–
2023–24	Henderson Silver Knights	AHL	69	0	5	5	31	–	–	–	–	–
2024–25	Abbotsford Canucks	AHL	4	0	0	0	4	–	–	–	–	–
2024–25	HC Bílí Tygři Liberec	ELH	15	2	6	8	4	5	0	0	0	2
ELH totals			15	2	6	8	4	5	0	0	0	2

=== International play ===
Year	Team	Event	Result	GP	G	A	Pts	PIM
2018	Canada West	WJAC	3rd place, bronze medalist(s)	6	0	2	2	0
Junior totals				6	0	2	2	0

== Awards and honours ==
Award	Year
BCHL
All-Rookie Team	2018
Second All-Star Team	2019
BCHL champion	2019
