= Ryan Graves (ice hockey) =

Canadian ice hockey player (born 1995)

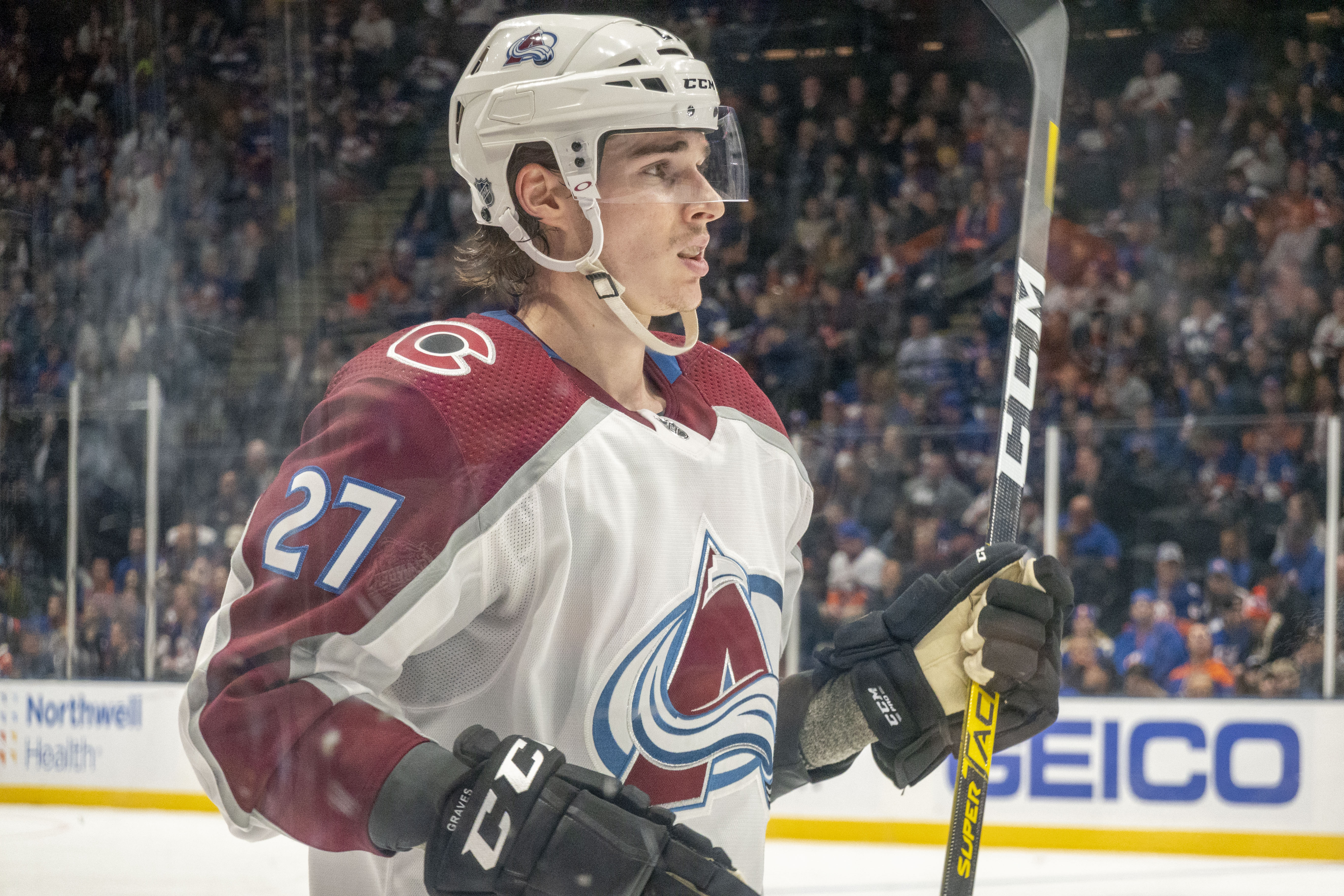
- Graves with the Colorado Avalanche in 2020
- Born: May 21, 1995 (age 31) Yarmouth, Nova Scotia, Canada
- Height: 6 ft 5 in (196 cm)
- Weight: 226 lb (103 kg; 16 st 2 lb)
- Position: Defence
- Shoots: Left
- NHL team Former teams: Pittsburgh Penguins; Colorado Avalanche; New Jersey Devils
- National team: Canada
- NHL draft: 110th overall, 2013; New York Rangers
- Playing career: 2015–present

Ryan Graves (born May 21, 1995) is a Canadian professional ice hockey player who is a defenceman for the Pittsburgh Penguins of the National Hockey League (NHL). He was selected by the New York Rangers in the fourth round, 110th overall, of the 2013 NHL entry draft. Graves has previously played for the Colorado Avalanche and the New Jersey Devils.

== Early life ==
Graves was born on May 21, 1995, in Yarmouth, Nova Scotia, to Ron Graves and Monica Brennan. He grew up as a childhood friend of fellow Nova Scotian Nathan MacKinnon, and the two often faced each other in local youth hockey games while also playing together on regional teams.

In his early years, Graves developed a reputation in the Nova Scotia youth hockey circuit for clumsiness, largely due to his comparatively tall frame. Despite this, his strength and shot-blocking ability earned praise from coaches in the Yarmouth County Minor Hockey Association.

During the 2010–11 minor ice hockey season, Graves played for the South Shore Canadian Tire Mustangs, where he scored five goals and added seven assists. He was named the team's top rookie and received the Scott Dee Memorial Award as the best rookie defenceman in the Nova Scotia Major Midget Hockey League. That same year, he also made a single appearance with the Yarmouth Mariners of the Maritime Junior Hockey League.

== Playing career ==
=== Junior ===
The Prince Edward Island Rocket of the Quebec Major Junior Hockey League (QMJHL) selected Graves in the first round, ninth overall, of the 2011 QMJHL Entry Draft. As a rookie during the 2011–12 season, he recorded two goals and seven assists for nine points, along with 34 penalty minutes. The Rocket finished last in the league with a 19–43–2–4 record, missing the postseason for the first time in seven years.

Graves later said that he had difficulty adjusting from minor to junior ice hockey as a rookie. By the 2012–13 season, however, he attributed his improved confidence to increased playing time, greater familiarity with the league, and the opportunity to learn from older teammates. He also practiced three times a week with a Newfoundland-based skating coach to address the coordination issues that had followed him since adolescence.

After boosting his offensive production in 2012–13, Graves drew the attention of NHL scouts and was selected in the fourth round, 110th overall, by the New York Rangers in the 2013 NHL entry draft.

The Rocket were rebranded as the Charlottetown Islanders for the 2013–14 season. Graves registered 12 points in 39 games with Charlottetown before being traded to the Val-d'Or Foreurs for their playoff push. In the postseason, he contributed eight points in 24 games to help the Foreurs capture the President's Cup. On March 17, 2014, his progress was rewarded when he signed a three-year, entry-level contract with the Rangers.

Ahead of the 2014–15 season, Graves was traded by Val-d'Or to the Quebec Remparts in exchange for Vincent Lanoue and draft picks on August 18, 2014. Serving as an assistant captain, he enjoyed a breakout season, recording career highs of 15 goals and 24 assists for 39 points in just 50 games. He was named to the Canadian Hockey League's Memorial Cup All-Star Team after collecting five points in five games for host club Quebec.

=== Professional ===
==== New York Rangers organization (2015–18) ====
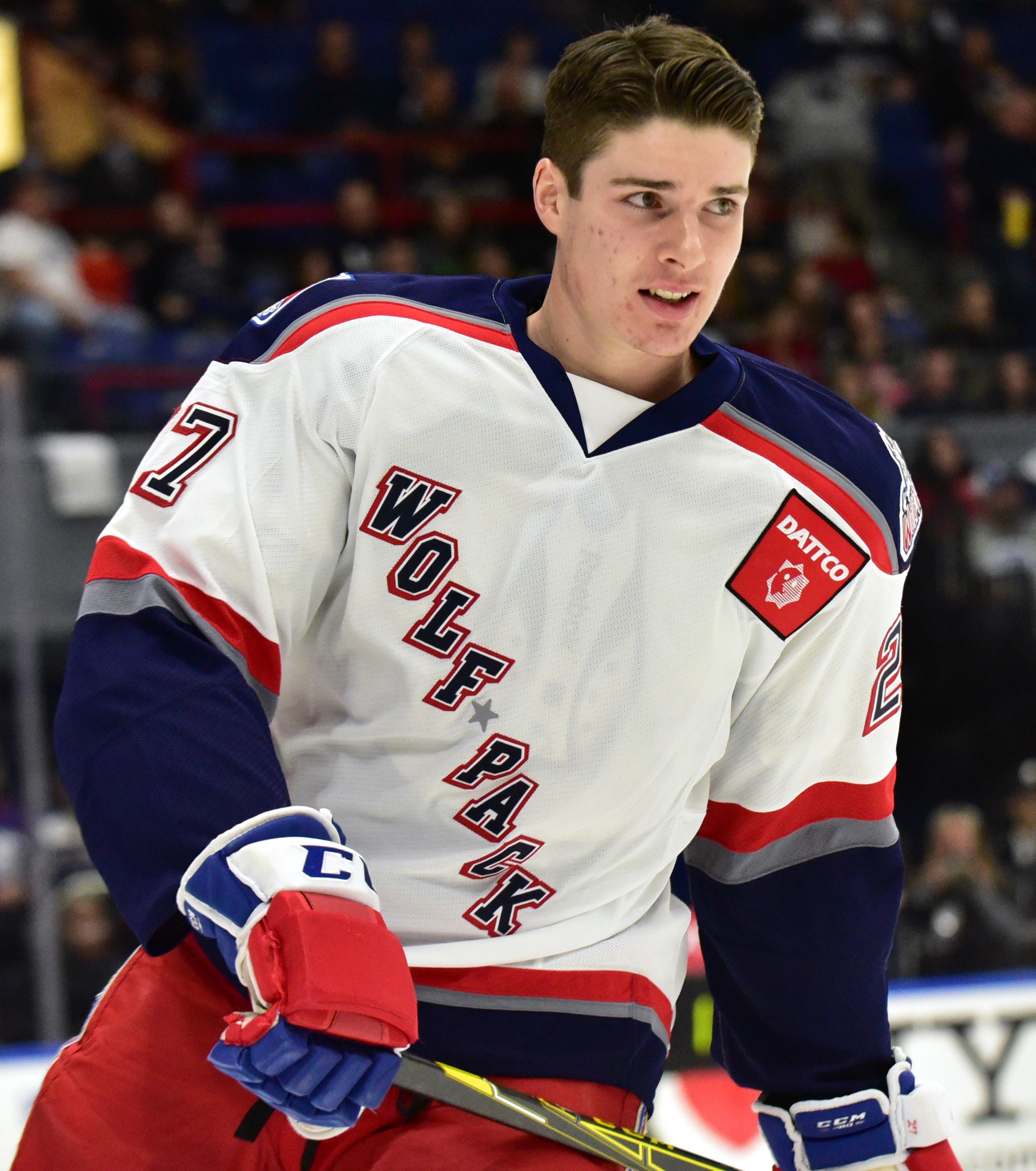
Graves at the 2016 AHL All-Star Game

In the 2015–16 season, Graves was assigned to the New York Rangers' American Hockey League (AHL) affiliate, the Hartford Wolf Pack. He made his professional debut on opening night, October 10, 2015, against the St. John's IceCaps. Thirteen days later, on October 23, he scored his first professional goal and added an assist in a 4–3 win over the Syracuse Crunch. Known as a hulking defenceman with strong mobility, Graves became a fixture on Hartford’s blueline and was selected to represent the club at the 2016 AHL All-Star Game, where he won the hardest shot competition with a 103.4 mph (166.4 km/h) slapshot. He finished the season leading Hartford defencemen with nine goals and 21 points in 74 games, though the Wolf Pack failed to qualify for the playoffs.

In the 2016–17 season, Graves continued his development, once again leading Hartford’s defence in scoring with eight goals and 22 assists for 30 points. He was also named one of the team’s alternate captains. However, during the final year of his entry-level contract, his production declined. In the 2017–18 season, he recorded just four goals and 11 points in 57 games.

==== Colorado Avalanche (2018–21) ====
Graves was traded by the New York Rangers to the Colorado Avalanche in exchange for Chris Bigras at the 2018 trade deadline on February 26, 2018. He was immediately assigned to Colorado’s AHL affiliate, the San Antonio Rampage, where he recorded one goal and six points in 21 games to close out the season.

On July 17, 2018, the Avalanche re-signed Graves to a one-year contract. He made his NHL debut with Colorado during the 2018–19 season and scored his first NHL goal on January 4, 2019, against the team that had drafted him, the New York Rangers. That season he split time between the Avalanche and their new AHL affiliate, the Colorado Eagles. On July 8, 2019, he was re-signed to another one-year contract.

During the 2019–20 season, Graves emerged as a regular in Colorado’s lineup, primarily playing alongside eventual Calder Memorial Trophy winner Cale Makar. In a top-pairing role, he set career highs in goals and points and led the NHL with a league-best +40 plus–minus rating. On October 12, 2020, the Avalanche signed him to a three-year, $9.5 million contract extension.

In the pandemic-delayed 2020–21 season, Graves played his 100th NHL game on January 22, 2021, in a 3–2 overtime win against the Anaheim Ducks. Used in a top-four role, he became a key part of Colorado’s penalty kill, finishing third in the league in short-handed time on ice. He appeared in 54 of the Avalanche’s 56 regular season games, recording two goals and 15 points.

==== New Jersey Devils (2021–2023) ====
On July 15, 2021, with the expansion draft approaching, Graves was traded by the Avalanche to the New Jersey Devils in exchange for Mikhail Maltsev and a second-round pick in the 2021 NHL entry draft.

In his first season with New Jersey, Graves set a new career high in points with 28, recording six goals and 22 assists across 75 games. In his second season, he appeared in 78 games, scoring eight goals and 18 assists for 26 points. His final assist of the season marked his 100th career NHL point.

==== Pittsburgh Penguins (2023–present) ====
After completing his contract with the Devils, Graves left the organization as an unrestricted free agent and remained in the Metropolitan Division by signing a six-year, $27 million contract with the Pittsburgh Penguins on July 1, 2023.

In his first season with Pittsburgh, Graves appeared in 70 games, recording three goals and 11 assists for 14 points. On March 29, 2024, he suffered a concussion in a game against the Columbus Blue Jackets. He was subsequently placed on long-term injured reserve on April 11 and missed the remainder of the regular season.

In October 2025, the Penguins placed Graves on waivers, and after going unclaimed, he was assigned him to their AHL affiliate, the Wilkes-Barre/Scranton Penguins. Graves was recalled by Pittsburgh in November 2025.

== Career statistics ==
=== Regular season and playoffs ===
			Regular season					Playoffs
Season	Team	League	GP	G	A	Pts	PIM	GP	G	A	Pts	PIM
2010–11	South Shore Mustangs	NSMMHL	32	5	7	12	58	5	0	6	6	8
2010–11	Yarmouth Mariners	MJAHL	1	0	0	0	2	3	0	0	0	2
2011–12	P.E.I. Rocket	QMJHL	62	2	7	9	34	—	—	—	—	—
2012–13	P.E.I. Rocket	QMJHL	68	3	13	16	90	6	0	0	0	6
2013–14	Charlottetown Islanders	QMJHL	39	3	9	12	52	—	—	—	—	—
2013–14	Val-d'Or Foreurs	QMJHL	26	2	8	10	16	24	1	7	8	24
2014–15	Quebec Remparts	QMJHL	50	15	24	39	49	21	5	6	11	25
2015–16	Hartford Wolf Pack	AHL	74	9	12	21	53	—	—	—	—	—
2016–17	Hartford Wolf Pack	AHL	76	8	22	30	69	—	—	—	—	—
2017–18	Hartford Wolf Pack	AHL	57	4	7	11	66	—	—	—	—	—
2017–18	San Antonio Rampage	AHL	21	1	5	6	7	—	—	—	—	—
2018–19	Colorado Eagles	AHL	32	2	7	9	26	—	—	—	—	—
2018–19	Colorado Avalanche	NHL	26	3	2	5	2	—	—	—	—	—
2019–20	Colorado Avalanche	NHL	69	9	17	26	45	15	1	2	3	6
2020–21	Colorado Avalanche	NHL	54	2	13	15	55	10	1	5	6	10
2021–22	New Jersey Devils	NHL	75	6	22	28	24	—	—	—	—	—
2022–23	New Jersey Devils	NHL	78	8	18	26	28	10	0	1	1	4
2023–24	Pittsburgh Penguins	NHL	70	3	11	14	30	—	—	—	—	—
2024–25	Pittsburgh Penguins	NHL	61	1	3	4	29	—	—	—	—	—
2025–26	Wilkes-Barre/Scranton Penguins	AHL	15	3	7	10	4	—	—	—	—	—
2025–26	Pittsburgh Penguins	NHL	22	1	0	1	10	—	—	—	—	—
NHL totals			455	33	86	119	223	35	2	8	10	20

Medal record

Representing Canada

Ice hockey

World Championships
Silver medal – second place	2022 Finland	

=== International ===
Year	Team	Event	Result	GP	G	A	Pts	PIM
2012	Canada Atlantic	U17	7th	5	0	0	0	2
2022	Canada	WC	2nd place, silver medalist(s)	10	2	5	7	0
Junior totals				5	0	0	0	2
Senior totals				10	2	5	7	0

== Awards and honours ==
Award	Year
NSMMHL
Rookie Defenseman Award	2011
CHL
Memorial Cup All-Star Team	2015
AHL
All-Star Game	2016
