= Mário Grman =

Slovak ice hockey player (born 1997)

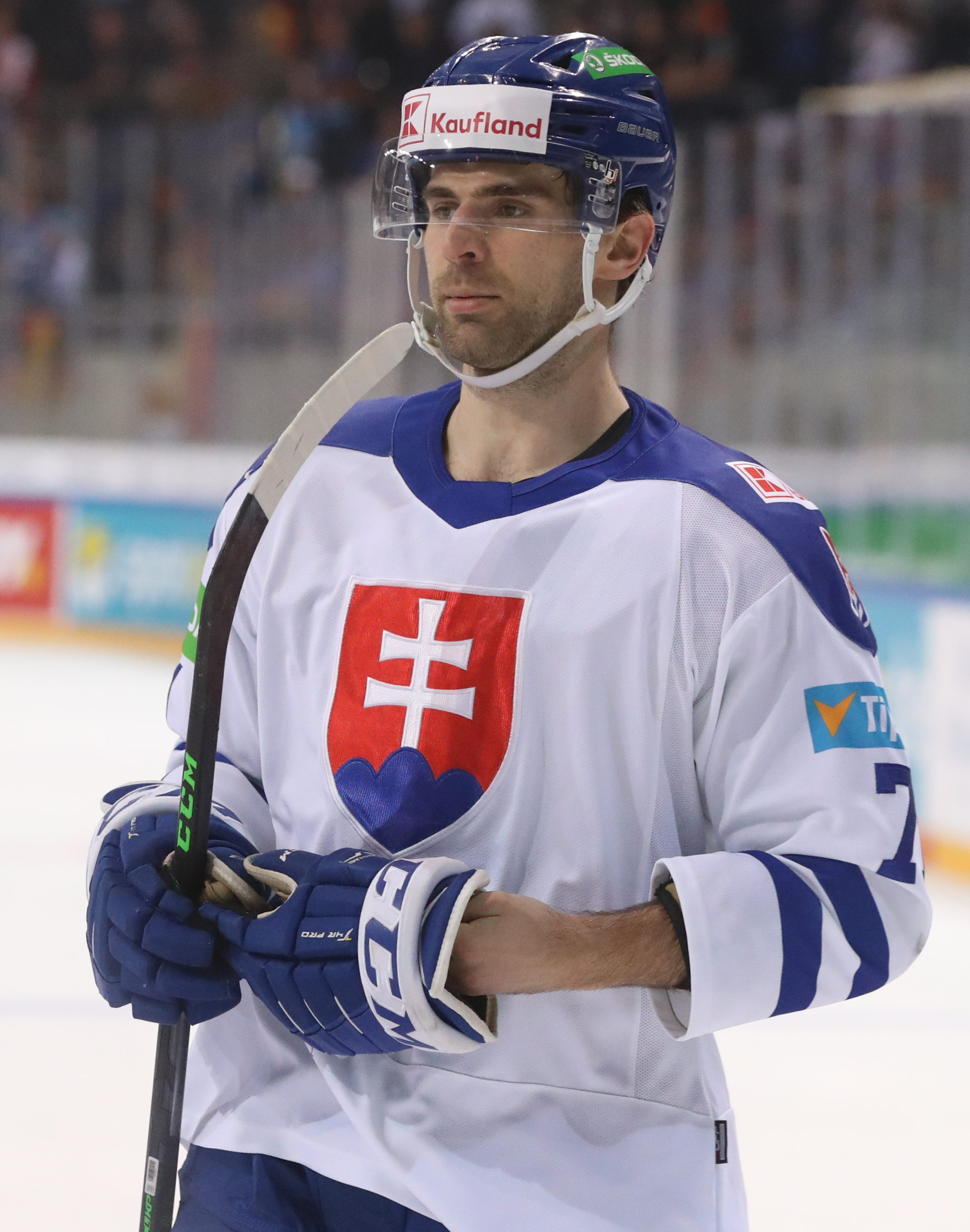
- Born: 11 April 1997 (age 28) Topoľčany, Slovakia
- Height: 6 ft 1 in (185 cm)
- Weight: 196 lb (89 kg; 14 st 0 lb)
- Position: Defence
- Shoots: Right
- KHL team Former teams: Admiral Vladivostok; MsHK Žilina; Piráti Chomutov; HC Slovan Bratislava; SaiPa; HPK; HC Vítkovice
- National team: Slovakia
- NHL draft: Undrafted
- Playing career: 2016–present

Mário Grman (born 11 April 1997) is a Slovak professional ice hockey defenceman for Admiral Vladivostok of the Kontinental Hockey League (KHL).

On 29 May 2024, having left HC Vítkovice Ridera of the Czech Extraliga (ELH) after a two-year tenure, Grman moved to the KHL in agreeing to a one-year contract for the 2024–25 season with Russian club, Admiral Vladivostok.

== Career statistics ==
=== International ===
Year	Team	Event	Result	GP	G	A	Pts	PIM
2014	Slovakia	U18	8th	5	0	0	0	6
2015	Slovakia	U18	7th	5	0	0	0	2
2017	Slovakia	WJC	8th	5	0	1	1	4
2018	Slovakia	WC	9th	5	0	1	1	2
2021	Slovakia	WC	8th	6	0	1	1	4
2021	Slovakia	OGQ	Q	3	0	0	0	2
2022	Slovakia	WC	8th	8	0	2	2	12
2023	Slovakia	WC	9th	6	0	0	0	2
2024	Slovakia	WC	7th	8	1	1	2	8
2024	Slovakia	OGQ	Q	3	1	0	1	4
2025	Slovakia	WC	11th	7	0	1	1	2
Junior totals				15	0	1	1	12
Senior totals				46	2	6	8	36
