= Damon Severson =

Canadian ice hockey player (born 1994)

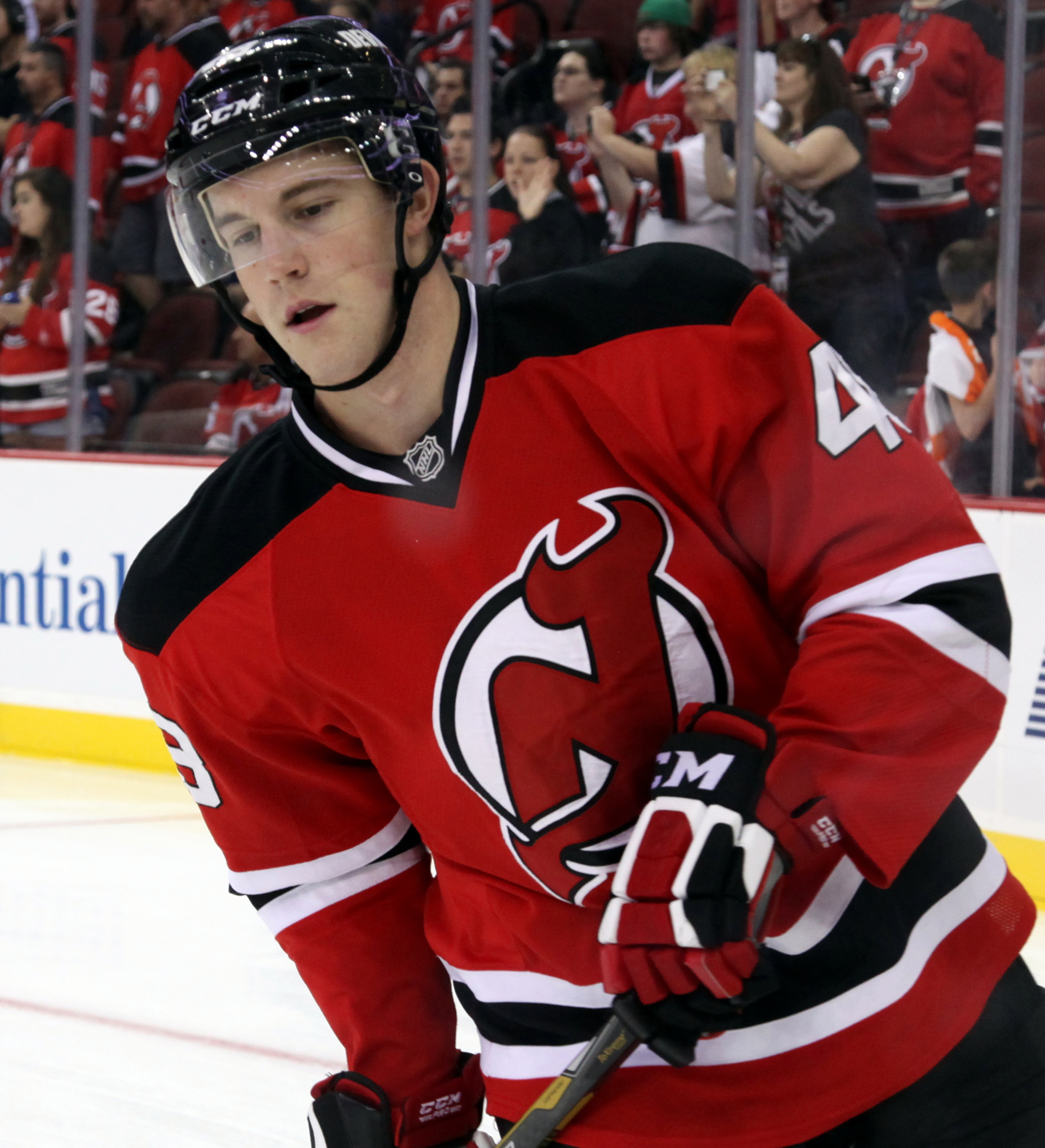
- Severson with the New Jersey Devils in 2014
- Born: August 7, 1994 (age 31) Brandon, Manitoba, Canada
- Height: 6 ft 2 in (188 cm)
- Weight: 205 lb (93 kg; 14 st 9 lb)
- Position: Defence
- Shoots: Right
- NHL team Former teams: Columbus Blue Jackets; New Jersey Devils
- National team: Canada
- NHL draft: 60th overall, 2012; New Jersey Devils
- Playing career: 2013–present

Damon Severson (born August 7, 1994) is a Canadian professional ice hockey player who is a defenceman for the Columbus Blue Jackets of the National Hockey League (NHL). He was selected by the New Jersey Devils in the second round, 60th overall, in the 2012 NHL entry draft.

Growing up in Melville, Saskatchewan, Severson began skating at the age of two and enrolled in hockey at the age of four. He played with the Yorkton Harvest of the Saskatchewan Male U18 AAA Hockey League and Melville Millionaires of the Saskatchewan Junior Hockey League during the 2009–10 season. As a result of his outstanding junior play, Severson was a ninth-round pick of the Kelowna Rockets in the 2009 WHL Bantam Draft. In his second season with the Rockets, Severson recorded career-high seven goals and 30 assists for 37 points through 56 games. As such, he won the Rockets' Most improved player and was selected by the New Jersey Devils in the second round of the 2012 NHL Entry Draft.

Severson made his professional debut during the 2014–15 season and recorded his first career NHL point and goal in the same game. By December, he had tallied four goals and eight assists for 12 points through New Jersey's first 32 games but then missed several games due to a hairline fracture in his ankle. Upon rejoining the NHL roster, Severson finished his first professional season with five goals and 17 points in 51 games. Prior to the start of the 2020–21 season, Severson was promoted to the rank of alternate captain by new head coach Lindy Ruff. He also became the longest-tenured player on the roster at the age of 26 following the trade of Kyle Palmieri and Travis Zajac to the New York Islanders.

Internationally, Severson has represented Canada at both the junior and senior levels. He made his junior team debut in 2011 at the 2011 World U-17 Hockey Challenge, where Team Canada failed to medal. Severson made his senior team debut during the 2019 IIHF World Championship where he helped them clinch a silver medal.

== Early life ==
Severson was born on August 7, 1994, in Brandon, Manitoba to Doug Severson and Donna Dixon. He began skating at the age of two and enrolled in hockey at the age of four. Beyond hockey, he also played football, baseball, basketball, and badminton.

== Playing career ==
=== Amateur ===
Growing up in Melville, Saskatchewan Severson played with the Yorkton Harvest of the Saskatchewan Male U18 AAA Hockey League and Melville Millionaires of the Saskatchewan Junior Hockey League during the 2009–10 season. As a result of his outstanding junior play, Severson was a ninth-round pick of the Kelowna Rockets in the Western Hockey League (WHL) 2009 bantam draft. He made his major junior debut at the age of 15 after impressing the coaching staff during training camp. He tallied his first career WHL goal on November 3, 2010, in a 5–2 win over the Kamloops Blazers. After recording four goals and seven assists for 11 points through 32 games, Severson was named to Team West at the 2011 World U-17 Hockey Challenge.

Severson returned to the Rockets for his sophomore campaign during the 2011–12 WHL season. Severson finished the season with a career-high seven goals and 30 assists for 37 points through 56 games. As such, he won the Rockets' Most improved player. At the conclusion of the season, Severson was invited to participate in the 2012 NHL Draft Combine as the 48th-ranked North American skater by the NHL Central Scouting Bureau's final rankings. He was eventually drafted 60th overall by the New Jersey Devils. Following the draft, Severson was signed to a three-year, entry-level contract with the Devils on September 6, 2012.

Following the signing, Severson and teammate Colton Sissons were not asked to attend their NHL teams' training camp and returned to the Rockets. He finished the season with a career-high 52 points through 71 games to win the Rockets Top Defenceman Award. As the season concluded, Severson signed an Amateur Tryout Agreement with the Albany Devils of the American Hockey League (AHL) and played two games. He then spent the offseason in his home province with a personal trainer before being selected for Team Canada's World Junior summer development camp. Following the tournament, Severson attended his first New Jersey Devils training camp. During this time, he played in two exhibition games with the Devils while averaging nearly 20 minutes of ice time. He was eventually returned to the Rockets as the coaches decided it was in his best interest to return to the major juniors league for another year.

Upon returning for the 2013–14 season, Severson and teammates Myles Bell and Tyson Baillie were named assistant captains for the Rockets on November 1, 2013. As a result of his play, Severson was also named to Team WHL to compete with during the CHL Canada/Russia Series. By December, Severson had tallied nine goals and 19 assists in 27 games and was invited to participate in Team Canada's World Junior Team training camp. After finishing the season with a plus-47 rating, Severson was again named the Rockets Top Defenceman. He also tallied 15 goals throughout the season, becoming the franchise's fourth most all-time in a single season. As such, he was also selected for the WHL Western Conference Second All Star team.

=== Professional ===
==== New Jersey Devils ====
After attending the Devils' 2014 rookie and training camp, Severson cracked the NHL roster prior to the start of the 2014–15 season. Upon making the lineup, he became one of four players 23 years old or younger to make the roster. He was subsequently paired with veteran Andy Greene and given the jersey number 28. Prior to his debut, Greene spoke highly of Severson, saying: "He's very mobile, makes a lot of great plays, can skate like the wind and is very confident." Severson then made his NHL debut on October 9, 2014, against the Philadelphia Flyers at the Wells Fargo Center. Two days later, he scored his first career NHL point, an assist, against the Florida Panthers and later recorded his first goal in the same game, six minutes later. As a result of his early success, he was named an early candidate for the Calder Memorial Trophy as the NHLs best rookie. By the end of October, Severson averaged over three minutes per game on the power play and logged a career-high 27:31. He continued to gain the trust of his coaches as the season continued and he ranked second among all NHL rookies in ice time per game at 22:45. By December, he had tallied four goals and eight assists for 12 points through New Jersey's first 32 games. However, on December 18, it was announced that Severson would remain out of the lineup for four-to-five weeks to recover from a hairline fracture in his ankle. He had suffered the injury on December 6, but played five more games before being placed on injured reserve. Severson returned to the Devils' lineup on March 3, 2015, after the Devils traded Marek Židlický to the Detroit Red Wings. Upon rejoining the NHL roster, Severson finished his first professional season with five goals and 17 points in 51 games.

The following season, Severson returned to the Devils to compete in his first full NHL season. After being a healthy scratch for their game against the Washington Capitals, Severson recorded his points in two straight game for the first time since December 9–11, 2014. He played in 72 games for the Devils, recording one goal and 21 points. After the Devils' regular season ended, Severson was re-assigned to the Albany Devils. Severson's play improved during the 2016–17 season, leading to a career-high of 28 assists and 31 points. Head coach John Hynes noted his increased confidence as the season continued, leading him to say: "His work ethic and compete on the puck is night and day from what it was last year...He's more poised with the puck. He's willing to accept hits to make plays. Last year, he was a little bit nervous in those situations." On October 29, 2016, Severson tallied his first game-winning goal in a win over the Tampa Bay Lightning. By November, Severson was tied with Taylor Hall for the Devils team-lead in points with three goals and nine assists for 12 points. His play also helped the Devils reach a five-game winning streak. As injuries began to plague the lineup, Severson's time on the ice increased to a team-high 28:05. He missed one game, a 3–0 loss to the Columbus Blue Jackets, in March due to an injury. Upon returning to the lineup, he played in his 200th career NHL game on April 1, 2017. In the Devils' final home game of the season, Severson was benched by coach John Hynes for the final 16 minutes of the game.

Prior to the start of the 2017–18 season, Severson signed a new six-year, $25.2 million contract with the Devils worth $4,166,700 annually. He began the season slow and was a healthy scratch twice by November 7, 2017. He later snapped a seven-game pointless drought at 13:45 of the second period in a 5–2 loss to the New York Rangers on December 9. On January 15, 2018, Severson helped the Devils end a six-game losing streak by scoring two goals in a 4–1 win over the Rangers. He also scored two goals in a 4–1 win over the New York Islanders to become the third defenceman in franchise history to do so against the team. Later, Severson continued to increase his career-high in goals during a game against the Carolina Hurricanes. His ninth even-strength goal of the season, which tied the game at 1–1, placed him third amongst all NHL defencemen in even strength goals. He ended the regular season by serving as a healthy scratch for the final three games. As the Devils qualified for the 2018 Stanley Cup playoffs, they met the Tampa Bay Lightning for Round 1. Severson served as a healthy scratch for Game 1 but returned for Game 2 and played 16:41 minutes of ice time. Despite this, the Devils fell to the Lightning in five games after losing 3–1 in Game 5.

During the 2018–19 NHL season, Severson set a career-high in goals with 11 and tied his career-high in assists with 28. He began the season strong and tallied five points through four games in November. The following month, Severson scored the opening goal just 25 seconds into a game against the Boston Bruins to mark the fastest goal of the Devils' season. In January, Severson lost his regular defence partner John Moore and was paired with Seth Helgeson. On March 12, 2019, Severson tallied an assist on Kyle Palmieri's goal to become the fourth Devils defencemen to record 100 assists before their 350th game. As he continued to produce, Severson's time on ice increased to a season-best 24:18 and he became one of only two Devils players to compete in all 82 games of the season. During the 2019 offseason, Severson competed with Team Canada at the 2019 IIHF World Championship and played in a charity softball game.

Severson returned from the 2019 IIHF World Championship after helping Team Canada win a silver medal after a 3–1 loss to Finland. Although he split his offseason time between the tournament and training back home in Kelowna, Severson expressed his excitement for the moves Devils General Manager Ray Shero made during the summer. Severson continued to produce and recorded an eight-game point streak by February 13, 2020, to match the longest streak by a Devils defenceman since Brian Rafalski in 2006-07. As a result, Severson was tied for 11th amongst NHL defencemen in points for the month of February. When the season was paused due to the COVID-19 pandemic, Severson led all Devils defencemen in goals, points, power-play points, takeaways, and average ice time.

Prior to the start of the 2020–21 season, Severson was promoted to the rank of alternate captain by new head coach Lindy Ruff. On February 2, 2021, Severson was one of five Devils players placed on the NHL's COVID protocol list. He was eventually taken off the list on February 14. Following the trade of Kyle Palmieri and Travis Zajac to the New York Islanders, Severson became the longest-tenured player on the roster at the age of 26. At the conclusion of the season, Severson revealed that he played the second half of the season with a broken toe which impacted his mobility. He also said it impacted his ability to push off his leg, and acted up during quick reactions during games.

During the preseason prior to his 2021–22 campaign, Severson stepped on a puck in practice and suffered a lower-body injury. This delayed his debut for the season until October 19, where he also scored his first goal in a 4–2 win over the Seattle Kraken. On November 18, 2021, Severson played in his 500th career NHL game against the Florida Panthers.

==== Columbus Blue Jackets ====
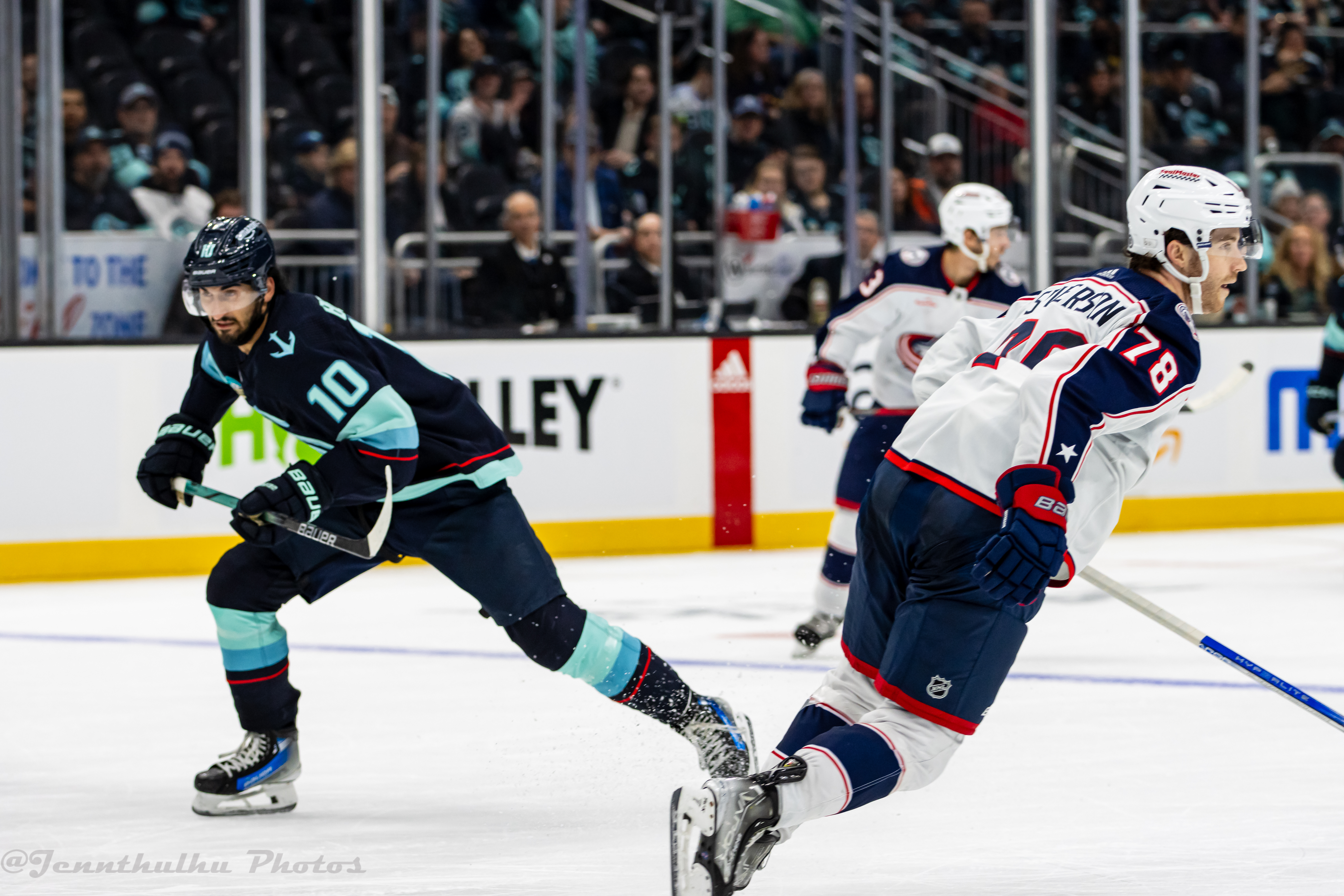
Severson (right) with the Blue Jackets in 2024.

On June 9, 2023, after signing an eight-year extension with New Jersey, Severson was traded to the Columbus Blue Jackets in a sign-and-trade deal in exchange for a third-round pick in the 2023 NHL entry draft.

== International play ==
Medal record

Representing Canada

Ice hockey

World Championships
Silver medal – second place	2019 Slovakia	
Silver medal – second place	2022 Finland	

As a native of Canada, Severson has represented his home country at both the junior and senior levels. He made his international debut with Team Canada West at the 2011 World U-17 Hockey Challenge, where they placed sixth. The following year, he competed at the 2012 IIHF World U18 Championships for Team Canada and clinched a bronze medal.

On April 29, 2019, Severson was selected to make his senior international debut after he was named to Canada's roster for the 2019 IIHF World Championship held in Slovakia. On May 23, in the quarterfinal game against Switzerland, Severson scored the game-tying goal for Canada with 0.4 seconds left to play in regulation time. Canada went on to win the game in overtime to advance to the semifinals. Severson helped Canada progress through to the final before losing to Finland to finish with the silver medal on May 26. He finished the tournament with one goal and five assists in ten games. Three years later, he rejoined Team Canada for the 2022 IIHF World Championship. The team again lost in the gold medal game to Finland.

Severson joined the senior national team for a third time in advance of the 2024 IIHF World Championship.

== Career statistics ==
=== Regular season and playoffs ===
			Regular season					Playoffs
Season	Team	League	GP	G	A	Pts	PIM	GP	G	A	Pts	PIM
2009–10	Yorkton Harvest	SMHL	44	9	25	34	53	4	1	1	2	18
2009–10	Melville Millionaires	SJHL	1	0	1	1	2	—	—	—	—	—
2009–10	Kelowna Rockets	WHL	5	0	0	0	0	—	—	—	—	—
2010–11	Kelowna Rockets	WHL	64	4	13	17	53	10	2	0	2	13
2011–12	Kelowna Rockets	WHL	56	7	30	37	80	4	2	0	2	2
2012–13	Kelowna Rockets	WHL	71	10	42	52	74	11	1	9	10	18
2012–13	Albany Devils	AHL	2	0	2	2	0	—	—	—	—	—
2013–14	Kelowna Rockets	WHL	64	15	46	61	63	14	4	14	18	18
2014–15	New Jersey Devils	NHL	51	5	12	17	22	—	—	—	—	—
2015–16	New Jersey Devils	NHL	72	1	20	21	32	—	—	—	—	—
2015–16	Albany Devils	AHL	3	0	1	1	9	11	0	8	8	14
2016–17	New Jersey Devils	NHL	80	3	28	31	58	—	—	—	—	—
2017–18	New Jersey Devils	NHL	76	9	15	24	42	4	0	0	0	12
2018–19	New Jersey Devils	NHL	82	11	28	39	58	—	—	—	—	—
2019–20	New Jersey Devils	NHL	69	8	23	31	52	—	—	—	—	—
2020–21	New Jersey Devils	NHL	56	3	18	21	29	—	—	—	—	—
2021–22	New Jersey Devils	NHL	80	11	35	46	57	—	—	—	—	—
2022–23	New Jersey Devils	NHL	81	7	26	33	38	12	1	2	3	6
2023–24	Columbus Blue Jackets	NHL	67	9	19	28	51	—	—	—	—	—
2024–25	Columbus Blue Jackets	NHL	70	6	19	25	47	—	—	—	—	—
2025–26	Columbus Blue Jackets	NHL	71	8	24	32	45	—	—	—	—	—
NHL totals			855	81	267	348	531	16	1	2	3	18

=== International ===
Year	Team	Event	Result	GP	G	A	Pts	PIM
2011	Canada Western	U17	6th	5	0	2	2	4
2012	Canada	U18	3rd place, bronze medalist(s)	7	0	2	2	8
2019	Canada	WC	2nd place, silver medalist(s)	10	1	5	6	16
2022	Canada	WC	2nd place, silver medalist(s)	10	2	6	8	4
2024	Canada	WC	4th	10	0	2	2	6
Junior totals				12	0	4	4	12
Senior totals				30	3	13	16	26

== Awards and honours ==
Honours	Year
CHL Top Prospects Game – Team Cherry	2012
