= Dominik Bittner =

German ice hockey player (born 1992)

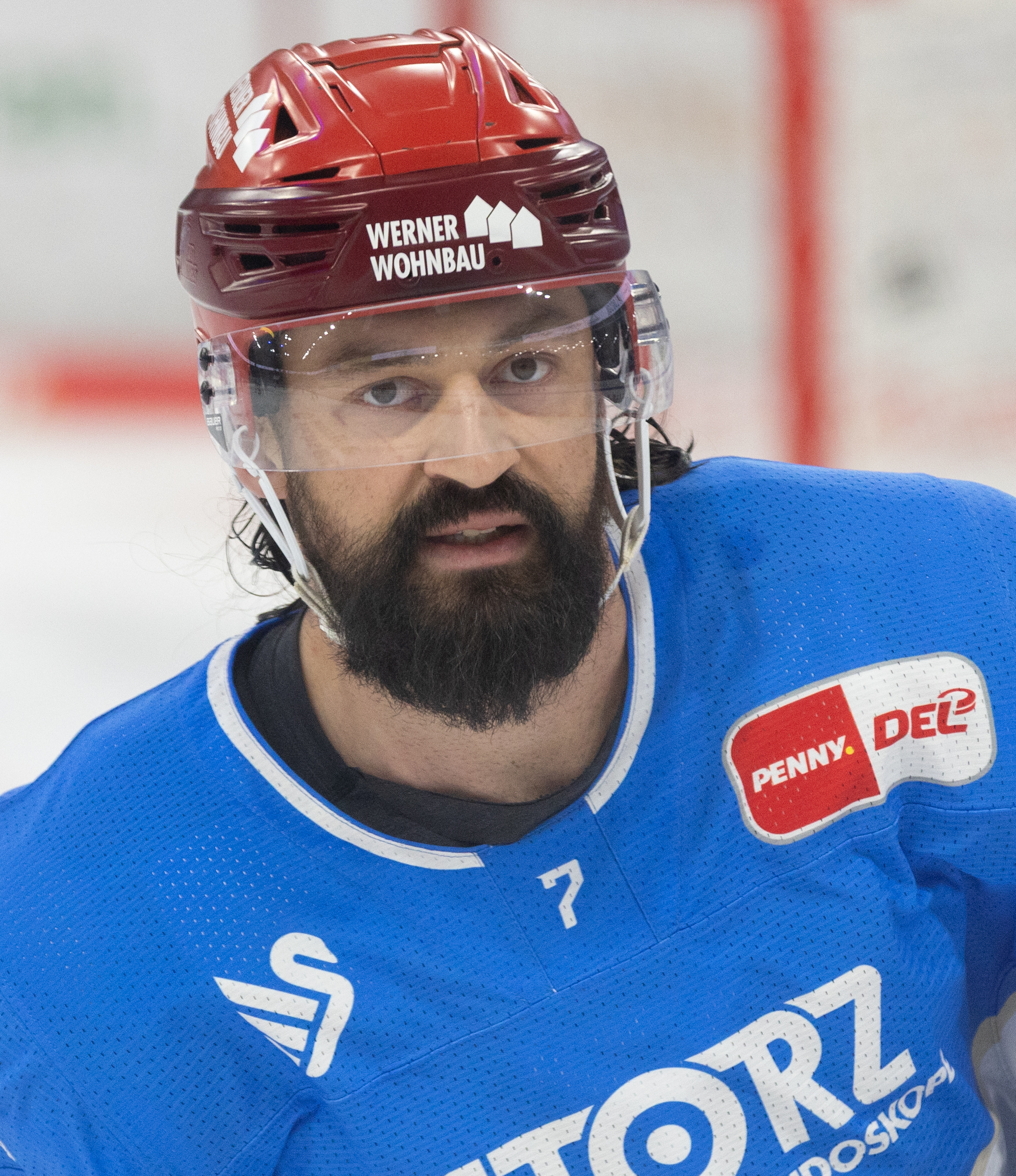
- Bittner in 2025
- Born: June 10, 1992 (age 33) Weilheim i.Ob., Germany
- Height: 5 ft 11 in (180 cm)
- Weight: 176 lb (80 kg; 12 st 8 lb)
- Position: Defencmen
- Shoots: Left
- DEL team Former teams: Schwenninger Wild Wings; Adler Mannheim; Grizzlys Wolfsburg; EHC München
- National team: Germany
- NHL draft: Undrafted
- Playing career: 2007–present

Dominik Bittner (born June 10, 1992) is a German professional ice hockey defenseman who plays for the Schwenninger Wild Wings of the Deutsche Eishockey Liga (DEL).

== Playing career ==
Playing with the Jungadler Mannheim, the junior team of the Adler Mannheim, Dominik Bittner won the German junior championships of the German Development League (DNL) in 2008, 2009, and 2010. During the 2010/2011 season, Bittner joined the Mannheim partner team Heilbronner Falken in the 2nd Bundesliga, which is the second highest senior league in Germany.

From the 2nd Bundesliga, Bittner went to America, playing for the Everett Silvertips (WHL) for one season. The following season he returned to Mannheim, Germany, now playing for the senior team of Adler Mannheim in the DEL, which is the major ice hockey league in Germany.

After five seasons with Mannheim, Bittner left to sign a two-year contract with fellow DEL outfit Schwenninger Wild Wings on April 21, 2017.

At the conclusion of his contract with the Wild Wings following the 2018–19 season, Bittner was announced to have left the club as a free agent. On March 7, 2019, Bittner agreed to a two-year contract through 2021 to join his third DEL club, Grizzlys Wolfsburg.

On 4 May 2023, Bittner left Wolfsburg to sign a one-year contract with reigning champions, EHC München, for the 2023–24 season.

== International play ==
Playing for junior Team Germany, Bittner participated at the World U17 Hockey Challenge and the IIHF World U18 Championship in 2009. In 2010 he moved up with the U20 team to the top 10 Group of the IIHF World U20 Championship and again took part at the U20 Championships in 2011.

In 2012 he took part at the Top Team Sotchi-challenge, when Team Germany and Team Russia encountered each other two times in two days, with Russia winning the first match after penalty and Germany winning one match in regular time.

On 25 January 2022, Bittner was selected to play for Team Germany at the 2022 Winter Olympics.

== Career statistics ==
=== Regular season and playoffs ===
			Regular season					Playoffs
Season	Team	League	GP	G	A	Pts	PIM	GP	G	A	Pts	PIM
2007–08	Jungadler Mannheim	DNL	36	4	3	7	30	8	0	1	1	12
2008–09	Jungadler Mannheim	DNL	35	4	11	15	49	8	3	3	6	10
2009–10	Jungadler Mannheim	DNL	31	9	24	33	66	8	3	6	9	16
2009–10	Heilbronner Falken	2.GBun	1	0	0	0	10	—	—	—	—	—
2010–11	Heilbronner Falken	2.GBun	40	0	2	2	34	4	0	0	0	4
2010–11	Jungadler Mannheim	DNL	—	—	—	—	—	1	0	0	0	0
2011–12	Everett Silvertips	WHL	68	4	13	17	65	4	0	0	0	0
2012–13	Adler Mannheim	DEL	42	1	2	3	64	4	0	0	0	4
2013–14	Adler Mannheim	DEL	41	1	2	3	24	—	—	—	—	—
2014–15	Adler Mannheim	DEL	21	0	0	0	28	1	0	0	0	0
2014–15	Heilbronner Falken	DEL2	13	2	6	8	8	—	—	—	—	—
2015–16	Adler Mannheim	DEL	45	2	5	7	24	2	0	0	0	14
2016–17	Adler Mannheim	DEL	36	1	4	5	12	1	0	0	0	0
2017–18	Schwenninger Wild Wings	DEL	43	0	5	5	22	1	0	0	0	0
2018–19	Schwenninger Wild Wings	DEL	46	2	14	16	59	—	—	—	—	—
2019–20	Grizzlys Wolfsburg	DEL	48	8	8	16	24	—	—	—	—	—
2020–21	Grizzlys Wolfsburg	DEL	20	2	6	8	6	9	0	3	3	6
2021–22	Grizzlys Wolfsburg	DEL	48	2	15	17	34	6	1	2	3	0
2022–23	Grizzlys Wolfsburg	DEL	56	5	11	16	22	14	0	0	0	4
2023–24	EHC München	DEL	36	2	7	9	33	—	—	—	—	—
2024–25	EHC München	DEL	44	1	3	4	16	6	0	0	0	4
DEL totals			526	27	82	109	368	44	1	5	6	32

=== International ===
Year	Team	Event	Result	GP	G	A	Pts	PIM
2009	Germany	U17	6th	5	0	0	0	12
2009	Germany	U18	10th	6	0	0	0	6
2010	Germany	WJC D1	11th	5	0	2	2	2
2011	Germany	WJC	10th	6	0	1	1	6
2021	Germany	WC	4th	2	1	0	1	0
2022	Germany	OG	10th	3	0	0	0	2
2022	Germany	WC	7th	6	0	4	4	0
Junior totals				22	0	3	3	26
Senior totals				11	1	4	5	2
