= Yegor Petukhov =

- Born: 28 February 1994 (age 32) Barnaul, Russia
- Height: 1.80 m (5 ft 11 in)
- Weight: 75 kg (165 lb; 11 st 11 lb)
- Position: Forward
- Shoots: Left
- KHL team Former teams: HC Sochi; Barys Astana; Dynamo Moscow; Admiral Vladivostok
- National team: Kazakhstan
- Playing career: 2013–present

Yegor Sergeyevich Petukhov (Russian: Егор Сергеевич Петухов; born 28 February 1994) is a Russian-born Kazakhstani ice hockey player for HC Sochi in the Kontinental Hockey League (KHL) and the Kazakhstani national team.

He represented Kazakhstan at the 2021 IIHF World Championship.
