= 2017–18 BCHL season =

- League: British Columbia Hockey League
- Sport: Hockey
- Duration: Regular season 8 September 2017 – 25 February 2018; Playoffs; 2 March 2018 – 19 April 2018
- Teams: 17

Fred Page Cup
- Champions: Wenatchee Wild

BCHL seasons
- ← 2016–17 2018–19 →

The 2017–18 BCHL season was the 56th season of the British Columbia Hockey League (BCHL). The seventeen teams from the Interior, Island and Mainland divisions played 58-game schedules. The 2017 BCHL Showcase, hosted in Chilliwack, shortly after the start of the season from September 20 to 24, 2017.

In March, the top teams from each division played for the Fred Page Cup, the BCHL Championship, won by the Wenatchee Wild. From there, they represented the league in the Doyle Cup, where they played and won a best-of-seven series against the Alberta Junior Hockey League champion Spruce Grove Saints to determine who represents the Pacific region in the Canadian Junior Hockey League championship, the Royal Bank Cup, held in Chilliwack, British Columbia, by the Chilliwack Chiefs.

== League changes ==
Team map, 2017–18 BCHL season
Island Division
Mainland Division
Interior Division
- The Wenatchee Wild were moved to the Interior division.
- The first round bye for the 1st and 2nd seed interior teams were eliminated. These teams face one of two wildcard teams consisting of the top two teams out of the three that finished in last place in their division. (5th in Mainland, 5th in Island, 7th in Interior)
- With the dissolution of the Western Canada Cup, the Doyle Cup was reinstated and to be contested by the BCHL and AJHL champions with a best-of-seven series starting on April 27.

== Standings ==
Note: GP = Games Played, W = Wins, L = Losses, T = Ties, OTL = Overtime Losses, Pts = Points

Mainland Division
| Team | Centre | W–L–T–OTL | Points |
| Prince George Spruce Kings | Prince George | 33–17–4–4 | 74 |
| Langley Rivermen | Langley | 25–20–3–10 | 63 |
| Surrey Eagles | White Rock | 26–22–2–80 | 62 |
| Chilliwack Chiefs | Chilliwack | 26–26–3–3 | 58 |
| Coquitlam Express | Coquitlam | 15–38–4–1 | 35 |
Island Division
| Team | Centre | W–L–T–OTL | Points |
| Victoria Grizzlies | Victoria | 32–18–4–4 | 72 |
| Nanaimo Clippers | Nanaimo | 32–20–3–3 | 70 |
| Powell River Kings | Powell River | 29–19–4–6 | 64 |
| Alberni Valley Bulldogs | Port Alberni | 17–32–4–5 | 43 |
| Cowichan Valley Capitals | Duncan | 10–41–2–5 | 27 |
Interior Division
| Team | Centre | W–L–T–OTL | Points |
| Penticton Vees | Penticton | 40–12–3–2 | 85 |
| Vernon Vipers | Vernon | 39–14–4–1 | 83 |
| Wenatchee Wild | Wenatchee | 37–16–1–4 | 79 |
| Trail Smoke Eaters | Trail | 32–21–1–4 | 69 |
| West Kelowna Warriors | West Kelowna | 28–27–1–2 | 59 |
| Merritt Centennials | Merritt | 24–27–2–5 | 55 |
| Salmon Arm Silverbacks | Salmon Arm | 24–29–1–3 | 52 |

- Standings listed on the official league website.

== 2017–18 BCHL Fred Page Cup playoffs ==
=== Division playoffs ===
Round 1 | Round 2
Is1 | Victoria | 4
Is4 | Alberni Valley | 3
Is1 | Victoria | 1
Is3 | Powell River | 4
Is2 | Nanaimo | 2
Is3 | Powell River | 4
Island/Mainland Divisions
M1 | Prince George | 4
M4 | Chilliwack | 3
M1 | Prince George | 4
M3 | Surrey | 3
M2 | Langley | 2
M3 | Surrey | 4
In1 | Penticton | 4
WC2 | Coquitlam | 0
In1 | Penticton | 3
In4 | Trail | 4
In4 | Trail | 4
In5 | West Kelowna | 0
Interior Division
In3 | Wenatchee | 4
In6 | Merritt | 0
In2 | Vernon | 2
In3 | Wenatchee | 4
In2 | Vernon | 4
WC1 | Salmon Arm | 0

Semifinal
M1 | Prince George | 4
Is3 | Powell River | 1
In3 | Wenatchee | 4
In4 | Trail | 1

Final
M1 | Prince George | 1
In3 | Wenatchee | 4

=== Doyle Cup ===
| Doyle Cup |
| BC | Wenatchee | 4 |
| AB | Spruce Grove | 1 |

== Scoring leaders ==
GP = Games Played, G = Goals, A = Assists, P = Points, PIM = Penalties In Minutes

| Player | Team | GP | G | A | Pts | PIM |
|---|---|---|---|---|---|---|
| Jasper Weatherby | Wenatchee Wild | 58 | 37 | 37 | 74 | 47 |
| Jamie Rome | Victoria Grizzlies | 55 | 22 | 48 | 70 | 64 |
| Ty Westgard | Surrey Eagles | 56 | 15 | 55 | 70 | 36 |
| Cooper Zech | Wenatchee Wild | 58 | 11 | 58 | 69 | 22 |
| John Wesley | Surrey Eagles | 56 | 37 | 31 | 68 | 71 |
| Owen Sillinger | Penticton Vees | 56 | 33 | 34 | 67 | 36 |
| Ben Berard | Powell River Kings | 58 | 29 | 38 | 67 | 22 |
| Alex Newhook | Victoria Grizzlies | 55 | 22 | 44 | 66 | 10 |
| Ethan de Jong | Prince George Spruce Kings | 50 | 17 | 46 | 63 | 20 |
| AJ Venderbeck | Wenatchee Wild | 49 | 37 | 25 | 62 | 38 |

== Leading goaltenders ==
Note: GP = Games Played, Mins = Minutes Played, W = Wins, L = Losses, T = Ties, OTL = Overtime Losses, GA = Goals Against, SO = Shutouts, Sv% = Save Percentage, GAA = Goals Against Average.

| Player | Team | GP | Mins | W | L | T | OTL | GA | SO | Sv% | GAA |
|---|---|---|---|---|---|---|---|---|---|---|---|
| Ty Taylor | Vernon Vipers | 31 | 1889 | 23 | 5 | 3 | 0 | 59 | 7 | 0.931 | 1.87 |
| Adam Scheel | Penticton Vees | 45 | 2620 | 29 | 12 | 3 | 0 | 91 | 3 | 0.927 | 2.08 |
| Anthony Yamnitsky | Vernon Vipers | 27 | 1624 | 16 | 10 | 1 | 0 | 57 | 3 | 0.919 | 2.11 |
| Even DeBrouwer | Prince George Spruce Kings | 45 | 2711 | 26 | 14 | 4 | 0 | 101 | 3 | 0.920 | 2.24 |
| Austin Roden | Merritt Centennials | 29 | 1676 | 12 | 11 | 3 | 0 | 67 | 2 | 0.931 | 2.40 |

== Award winners ==
- Brett Hull Trophy (Top Scorer): Jasper Weatherby, Wenatchee Wild (37 goals, 37 assists, 74 points)
- Best Defenceman: Cooper Zech, Wenatchee Wild
- Bruce Allison Memorial Trophy (Rookie of the Year): Alex Newhook, Victoria Grizzlies
- Bob Fenton Trophy (Most Sportsmanlike): Ben Poisson, Prince George Spruce Kings
- Top Goaltender: Ty Taylor, Vernon Vipers
- Wally Forslund Memorial Trophy (Best Goaltending Duo): Ty Taylor & Anthony Yamnitsky, Vernon Vipers (1.98 combined GAA)
- Vern Dye Memorial Trophy (regular-season MVP): Jasper Weatherby, Wenatchee Wild
- Joe Tennant Memorial Trophy (Coach of the Year): Bliss Littler, Wenatchee Wild
- Ron Boileau Memorial Trophy (Best Regular Season Record): Penticton Vees, 86 pts
- Fred Page Cup (League Champions): Wenatchee Wild

== Players selected in 2018 NHL entry draft ==
Rd2: 48 Jonathan Tychonick – Ottawa Senators (Penticton Vees)
Rd3: 81 Seth Barton – Detroit Red Wings (Trail Smoke Eaters)
Rd4: 99 Stanislav Devin – Vegas Golden Knights (Wenatchee Wild)
Rd4: 104 Jasper Weatherby – San Jose Sharks (Wenatchee Wild)
Rd5: 126 Angus Crookshank – Ottawa Senators (Langley Rivermen)
Rd7: 190 Brett Stapley – Montreal Canadiens (Vernon Vipers)
Rd7: 214 Ty Taylor – Tampa Bay Lightning (Vernon Vipers)

== See also ==
- 2017 in ice hockey
- 2018 in ice hockey
- 2018 NHL entry draft
