= 2018–19 BCHL season =

2018–19 BCHL Season
- League: British Columbia Hockey League
- Sport: Hockey
- Duration: Regular season 7 September 2018 – 24 February 2019; Playoffs; 28 February – 17 April 2019
- Teams: 17

Fred Page Cup
- Champions: Prince George Spruce Kings

BCHL seasons
- ← 2017–18 2019–20 →

The 2018–19 BCHL season is the 57th season of the British Columbia Hockey League (BCHL). The seventeen teams from the Interior, Island and Mainland divisions played 58-game schedules. The 2018 BCHL Showcase, hosted annually in Chilliwack, occurred shortly after the start of the season from September 20 to 22, 2018.

In March, the top teams from each division played for the Fred Page Cup, the BCHL Championship, won by the Prince George Spruce Kings. From there, they represented the league in the Doyle Cup, a best-of-seven series against the Alberta Junior Hockey League champion Brooks Bandits, normally to determine who represents the Pacific region in the National Junior A Championship. However, as the National Junior A Championship was being hosted in Brooks, Alberta, by the Brooks Bandits with the automatic hosts berth, the Spruce Kings were already guaranteed a spot in the tournament no matter the outcome. The Spruce Kings defeated the Bandits four games to two.

== League changes ==
Team map, 2018–19 BCHL season
Island Division
Mainland Division
Interior Division
- Overtime consisted of a single five minute 3-on-3 overtime period, followed by a three player shootout.
- The league began using hybrid icing rules.

== Standings ==
Note: GP = Games Played, W = Wins, L = Losses, OTL = Overtime Losses, Pts = Points

Island Division
Team	Centre	W–L–OTL	Points
Victoria Grizzlies	Victoria	36–18–4	76
Powell River Kings	Powell River	34–21–3	71
Nanaimo Clippers	Nanaimo	27–30–1	55
Alberni Valley Bulldogs	Port Alberni	21–34–3	45
Cowichan Valley Capitals	Duncan	17–35–6	40
Mainland Division
Team	Centre	W–L–OTL	Points
Chilliwack Chiefs	Chilliwack	42–15–1	85
Prince George Spruce Kings	Prince George	39–13–6	84
Coquitlam Express	Coquitlam	28–24–6	62
Langley Rivermen	Langley	27–27–4	58
Surrey Eagles	White Rock	13–41–4	30
Interior Division
Team	Centre	W–L–OTL	Points
Penticton Vees	Penticton	37–16–5	79
Merritt Centennials	Merritt	36–15–7	79
Wenatchee Wild	Wenatchee	32–20–6	70
Vernon Vipers	Vernon	26–21–11	63
Salmon Arm Silverbacks	Salmon Arm	27–26–5	59
West Kelowna Warriors	West Kelowna	28–28–2	58
Trail Smoke Eaters	Trail	23–24–11	57

- Standings listed on the official league website.

== Post-season ==
=== 2019 BCHL Fred Page Cup playoffs ===
Round 1	Round 2
Is1	Victoria	4
Is4	Alberni Valley	0
Is1	Victoria	4
Is2	Powell River	3
Is2	Powell River	4
Is3	Nanaimo	1
Island/Mainland Divisions
M1	Chilliwack	4
M4	Langley	3
M1	Chilliwack	0
M2	Prince George	4
M2	Prince George	4
M3	Coquitlam	1
In3	Wenatchee	4
In6	West Kelowna	3
In3	Wenatchee	4
WC2	Cowichan Valley	2
In1	Penticton	2
WC2	Cowichan Valley	4
Interior Division
In4	Vernon	4
In5	Salmon Arm	1
In4	Vernon	4
WC1	Trail	3
In2	Merritt	1
WC1	Trail	4

Semifinals
Is1	Victoria	0
M2	Prince George	4
In3	Wenatchee	1
In4	Vernon	4

Finals
M2	Prince George	4
In4	Vernon	0

=== Doyle Cup ===
Doyle Cup
BC	Prince George	4
AB	Brooks	2

== Scoring leaders ==
GP = Games Played, G = Goals, A = Assists, P = Points, PIM = Penalties In Minutes

Player	Team	GP	G	A	Pts	PIM
Alex Newhook	Victoria Grizzlies	53	38	64	102	21
Ryan Brushett	Powell River Kings	55	41	43	84	22
Mike Hardman	West Kelowna Warriors	58	39	33	72	16
Dustin Manz	Prince George Spruce Kings	58	33	37	70	35
Matt Holmes	Chilliwack Chiefs	54	28	40	68	14
Bradley Cocca	Merritt Centennials	58	23	45	68	44
Alexander Campbell	Victoria Grizzlies	53	21	46	67	6
Kevin Wall	Chilliwack Chiefs	49	31	33	64	50
Carter Berger	Chilliwack Chiefs	54	27	36	63	48
Levi Glasman	Powell River Kings	58	24	39	63	24

== Leading goaltenders ==
Note: GP = Games Played, Mins = Minutes Played, W = Wins, L = Losses, OTL = Overtime Losses, GA = Goals Against, SO = Shutouts, Sv% = Save Percentage, GAA = Goals Against Average.

Player	Team	GP	Mins	W	L	OTL	GA	SO	Sv%	GAA
Logan Neaton	Prince George Spruce Kings	47	2748	32	8	0	88	5	..914	1.92
Jack LaFontaine	Penticton Vees	45	2686	30	13	0	98	3	.923	2.19
Cal Sandquist	Wenatchee Wild	28	1379	13	9	0	57	0	.890	2.48
Kurtis Chapman	Victoria Grizzlies	38	2188	26	9	0	92	4	.933	2.52
Aidan Porter	Vernon Vipers	40	2366	19	17	0	102	4	.908	2.59

== Award winners ==
- Brett Hull Trophy (top scorer): Alex Newhook, Victoria
- Best Defenceman: James Miller, Penticton
- Bruce Allison Memorial Trophy (Rookie of the Year): Alexander Campbell, Victoria
- Bob Fenton Trophy (most sportsmanlike): Mike Hardman, West Kelowna
- Top Goaltender: Jack LaFontaine, Penticton
- Wally Forslund Memorial Trophy (best goaltending duo): Jack LaFontaine and Derek Krall, Penticton
- Vern Dye Memorial Trophy (regular season MVP): Alex Newhook, Victoria
- Joe Tennant Memorial Trophy (Coach of the Year): Joe Martin, Merritt
- Ron Boileau Memorial Trophy (best regular season record): Chilliwack Chiefs
- Fred Page Cup (playoff champions): Prince George Spruce Kings

== Players selected in 2019 NHL entry draft ==
- Rd1 16: Alex Newhook - Colorado Avalanche (Victoria Grizzlies)
- Rd3 65: Alexander Campbell - Nashville Predators (Victoria Grizzlies)
- Rd3 86: Layton Ahac - Vegas Golden Knights (Prince George Spruce Kings)
- Rd4 106: Carter Berger - Florida Panthers (Victoria Grizzlies)
- Rd5 134: Harrison Blaisdell - Winnipeg Jets (Chilliwack Chiefs)
- Rd5 144: Logan Neaton - Winnipeg Jets (Prince George Spruce Kings)
- Rd6 181: Kevin Wall - Carolina Hurricanes (Chilliwack Chiefs)
- Rd7 216: Massimo Rizzo - Carolina Hurricanes (Penticton Vees)

== See also ==
- 2018 in ice hockey
- 2019 in ice hockey
- 2019 NHL entry draft
