= Tyson Jost =

Canadian ice hockey player (born 1998)

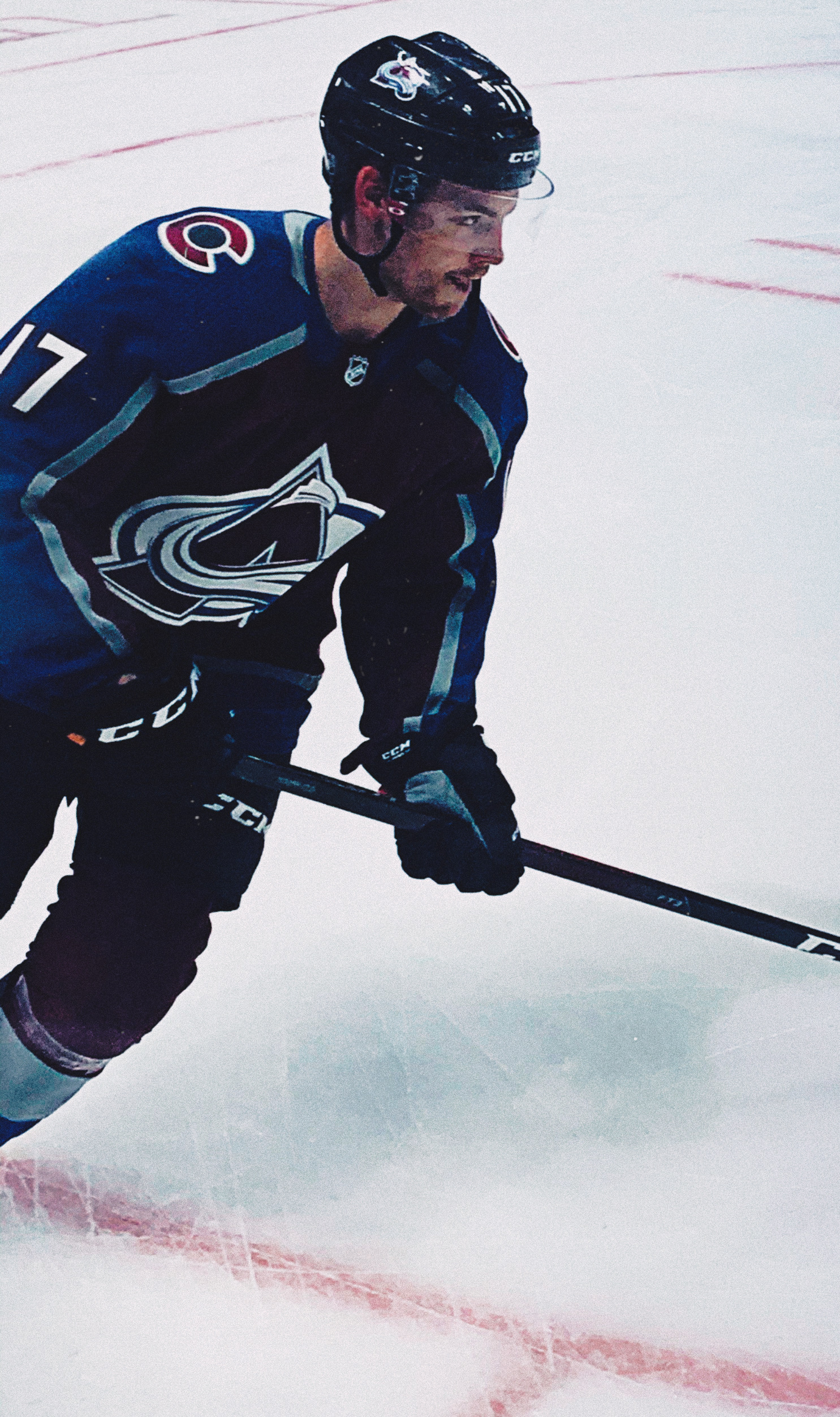
- Jost with the Colorado Avalanche in 2020
- Born: March 14, 1998 (age 28) St. Albert, Alberta, Canada
- Height: 5 ft 11 in (180 cm)
- Weight: 187 lb (85 kg; 13 st 5 lb)
- Position: Forward
- Shoots: Left
- NHL team (P) Cur. team Former teams: Nashville Predators; Milwaukee Admirals (AHL); Colorado Avalanche; Minnesota Wild; Buffalo Sabres; Carolina Hurricanes
- National team: Canada
- NHL draft: 10th overall, 2016; Colorado Avalanche
- Playing career: 2017–present

Tyson Jost (born March 14, 1998) is a Canadian professional ice hockey player who is a forward for the Milwaukee Admirals of the American Hockey League (AHL) while under contract to the Nashville Predators of the National Hockey League (NHL).

Born in St. Albert, Alberta, to a single mother, Jost moved to British Columbia to grow his hockey career at the Pursuit of Excellence Hockey Academy. From there, he played with the Okanagan Rockets of the British Columbia Major Midget League and Penticton Vees of the British Columbia Hockey League to retain his NCAA eligibility. Jost played one season of NCAA Division I ice hockey with the North Dakota Fighting Hawks after being drafted 10th overall by the Colorado Avalanche in the 2016 NHL entry draft, and turned pro immediately following his lone collegiate season.

Jost made his NHL debut with the Avalanche during the 2016–17 season after the Fighting Hawks fell to Boston University in the first round of the 2017 NCAA Division I Men's Ice Hockey Tournament. He spent the following 5 seasons within the Avalanche organization moving between their American Hockey League (AHL) affiliate, the Colorado Eagles, and the NHL level. During his sixth season with the Avalanche, Jost was traded to one of their division rivals, the Minnesota Wild, where he played briefly before being waived and claimed by Buffalo. Following two seasons with Buffalo, Jost signed with the Carolina Hurricanes; he was subsequently claimed off waivers by the Predators during training camp in October 2025.

Internationally, Jost has competed for Team Canada at both the junior and senior levels, winning a gold medal with them at the 2015 Ivan Hlinka Memorial Tournament and silver at the 2017 World Junior Ice Hockey Championships and 2019 IIHF World Championship.

== Early life ==
Jost was born on March 14, 1998, in St. Albert, Alberta, to single mother Laura Jost. He eventually moved to Kelowna, British Columbia and lived with his grandparents in order to attend the Pursuit of Excellence Hockey Academy with his cousin. He also grew up with a younger sister Kacey (a volleyball player for the Canada women's national volleyball team), with whom he is very close. He has referred to his mother and sister as "the rocks of my life." Jost was also born with color blindness.

== Playing career ==
=== Amateur ===
While playing in Kelowna for his sophomore season, Jost recorded 56 goals and 109 points in 33 games. This earned him attention from the Western Hockey League (WHL) and he was eventually drafted by the Everett Silvertips at 7th overall during the 2013 WHL Bantam Draft. In spite of his high selection, Jost decided to play with the Okanagan Rockets of the British Columbia Major Midget League to retain his NCAA eligibility. In his first and only season with the Rockets, he led the team in scoring with 44 goals and 88 points to help them claim the BC Hockey Major Midget League (BCMML) Championship. Jost also made his debut in the British Columbia Hockey League (BCHL) after agreeing to play with the Penticton Vees. In his first full BCHL season in 2014–15, Jost's playmaking and scoring ability were apparent in helping the Vees reach the Fred Page Cup. He compiled 45 points in 44 games to earn a selection to the BCHL All-Rookie Team.

Prior to his second full season with the Vees, Jost verbally committed to play NCAA Division I ice hockey for North Dakota Fighting Hawks starting in the 2016–17 season. After announcing his decision to return to the BCHL for the 2015–16 season, Jost was appointed team captain alongside assistant captain Dante Fabbro. In his first season as captain, Jost justified his status as a potential first-round pick with the Penticton Vees with a dominant 104 points in only 48 regular season games. Upon the Vees reaching the RBC Cup, Jost was awarded the 2016 RBC Canadian Junior Hockey League National Player of the Year award. He led the league with 62 assists and finished third in overall scoring with the highest point-per-game rate to be selected as the BCHL Most Valuable Player, Canadian Junior Hockey League (CJHL) Top Forward, and earn CJHL National Player of the Year honours.

Leading up to the 2016 NHL entry draft, Jost was ranked 16th amongst all North American skaters by the NHL Central Scouting Bureau. Upon being drafted 10th overall by the Colorado Avalanche, Jost reflected on the strength of the BCHL, alongside teammate Dante Fabbro and Dennis Cholowski in helping the league set a new record with three players taken in the first round of a draft. Although Jost previously committed to play in the NCAA, his WHL rights were traded from the Silvertips to the Regina Pats along with Dawson Leedahl.

As promised, Jost immediately began his collegiate career in the 2016–17 season, quickly adapting to the Fighting Hawks in assuming first-line responsibilities. He finished his freshman season placing second amongst North Dakota in scoring with 16 goals and 35 points in 33 games, earning a selection to the NCHC All-Rookie Team. As a rookie, he helped lead the team to the 2017 NCHC Frozen Faceoff, where they captured their first title and he was named to the Frozen Faceoff All-Tournament Team. Jost continued to help the Fighting Hawks advance to the first round of the 2017 NCAA Division I Men's Ice Hockey Tournament, where they eventually lost to Boston University. On March 29, 2017, Jost opted to end his collegiate career, in agreeing to a three-year, entry-level contract with the Colorado Avalanche.

=== Professional ===
==== Colorado Avalanche ====
Jost joined the Avalanche immediately to help close out the franchise's worst season in Denver, making his NHL debut in a 2–1 shootout victory over the St. Louis Blues on March 31, 2017. He scored his first NHL goal with the Avalanche in a 4–3 defeat to the Minnesota Wild on April 6, the team's final home game of the season. He attended the Avalanche's training camp prior to the 2017–18 season and made their opening night line up. His stay in the NHL turned out to be shortlived as he suffered a lower-body injury and missed eight games. Before returning to the Avalanche lineup, the team assigned him to their American Hockey League affiliate, the San Antonio Rampage. After recording one goal and assist in five games with the Rampage, he returned to the NHL for the remainder of the regular and post season. Jost made his post-season debut in Round 1 of the Stanley Cup playoffs against the Nashville Predators, during which he recorded his first post-season point.

After attending the Avalanche's training camp, Jost was named to their opening night roster to begin the 2018–19 season. His play remained stagnant throughout the season and he was reassigned to the Avalanche's newest AHL affiliate, the Colorado Eagles, in January after recording six goals and nine assists in 43 games. As he regained his confidence, Jost played on the top lines with the Eagles and spent time on the power play to eventually earn a recall to the NHL on February 12, 2019. While with the Avalanche, Jost surpassed his rookie campaign's point total after he registered his 23rd point of the season in March 2019. He concluded the regular season with 26 points in a career high 70 NHL games to help the Avalanche qualify for the 2019 Stanley Cup playoffs. During the playoffs, Jost recorded his first career post-season goal in Game Five of Round One against the Calgary Flames. Although the Avalanche beat the Flames, they eventually lost in Game 7 to the San Jose Sharks.

The following season, Jost was again invited to the Avalanche's training camp and cracked their opening night roster to begin the 2019–20 season. On October 18, 2019, Jost recorded his first career NHL hat-trick in a 6–2 win over the Tampa Bay Lightning to extend the team's point streak to eight games. After the game, Jost stated that "It's kind of something you always dream about as a kid playing in your backyard. It felt really special. It was an awesome moment." Following this, Jost recorded his second multi-point game of the season after he tallied two assists in a 4–2 win over the Columbus Blue Jackets. However, he then suffered an upper-body injury during a game against the Edmonton Oilers and subsequently missed four games before returning to the lineup on November 25. In his first game back, Jost spent most of his time on the team's fourth line and he recorded three shots on goal and one hit in 10:44 of ice time.

During the shortened 2020–21 season, Jost recorded 17 points through 54 games with a career-best +14 plus/minus rating. On October 18, 2021, Jost accepted a one-year qualifying offer with the Avalanche. He recorded six goals and 14 points in 59 games for Colorado during his sixth year with the club in the 2021–22 season.

==== Minnesota Wild ====
On March 15, 2022, the Avalanche traded Jost to divisional rivals, the Minnesota Wild, in exchange for forward Nico Sturm. In search of a fresh start, Jost made his debut with the Wild the following day in a 4-2 victory against the Boston Bruins on March 16, 2022. He notched his first point with the Wild, registering a game-winning assist in a 3-0 victory over the Vegas Golden Knights on March 21, 2022. Featuring in a bottom six role, Jost helped the Wild to a 16-3-2 record through 21 appearances, including scoring the game-winning goal against his former club, the Colorado Avalanche, in the final regular season game on April 29, 2022. In the playoffs, he was a staple of Minnesota's fourth-line, going scoreless in 6 games in a 4-2 series defeat to the St. Louis Blues.

Entering his final season under contract and fuelled through the disappointment of missing out on a Stanley Cup championship with former club, the Colorado Avalanche, Jost enjoyed a productive pre-season and was slated to begin the 2022–23 season in an elevated role alongside Joel Eriksson Ek and Marcus Foligno. Unable to capitalise on his opportunity, Jost added just 3 assists through 12 games and served as a healthy scratch through 4 games before he was placed on waivers by the Wild on November 18, 2022.

==== Buffalo Sabres ====
On November 19, 2022, Jost moved to the Eastern Conference after he was claimed off waivers by the Buffalo Sabres. He made his debut with the Sabres, featuring in a bottom six role and helping Buffalo end an eight game winless streak in a 7-2 victory over the Montreal Canadiens on November 22, 2023. Cementing a role within the forward group, Jost regained his offensive touch in registering 7 goals and 15 assists for 22 points in 59 appearances.

As an impending restricted free agent, Jost was initially not tendered a qualifying offer with the Sabres. On the opening day of free agency, Jost re-signed to a salary matching one-year $2 million contract with Buffalo on July 1, 2023. In the following 2023–24 season, Jost was unable to replicate his offensive contributions, posting just 2 goals and 4 points through 29 regular season games before he was placed on waivers by the Sabres on December 28, 2023. Going unclaimed, Jost was re-assigned to the AHL for the first time in five years joining the Sabres AHL affiliate, the Rochester Americans. Jost played 25 games with the Americans, collecting 14 points, before he returned to the Sabres to close out the season, finishing with just 6 points through 43 appearances.

==== Carolina Hurricanes ====
As a free agent from the Sabres, Jost opted to continue his career in the Eastern Conference, securing a league-minimum one-year, $775,000 contract with the Carolina Hurricanes on July 1, 2024. Jost replaced the injured Jack Drury in December 2024 before getting injured himself during a game on December 31, 2024 in Columbus. Utilised in bottom six forward role, Jost appeared in 39 regular-season games for the Hurricanes, totaling nine points with four goals and five assists.

On July 2, 2025, after testing the free agent market, Jost opted to sign a one-year, two-way contract extension with the Hurricanes for the 2025–26 season. He was waived by the Hurricanes for the purpose of being reassigned to the Chicago Wolves of the American Hockey League (AHL) on September 30, 2025.

==== Nashville Predators ====
On October 1, 2025, Jost was claimed off waivers by the Nashville Predators. He scored his first goal for the Predators on October 21st, 2025, against the Ducks, and played in his 500th NHL regular season game on October 16th, 2025, in Montreal.

Jost as a free agent at the conclusion of his contract with the Predators, went un-signed over the summer before returning to the Predators on an initial try-out contract through pre-season before agreeing to a one-year, two-way contract extension for the 2026–27 season on September 28, 2026.

== International play ==
Medal record

Representing Canada

World Championships
Silver medal – second place	2019 Slovakia	

World Junior Championships
Silver medal – second place	2017 Canada	

Ivan Hlinka Memorial Tournament
Gold medal – first place	2015 Slovakia	

Internationally, Jost has competed for Team Canada at both the junior and senior level. His first international event was in 2014 when he was selected to participate with Canada White in the World U-17 Hockey Challenge. Prior to his second season with the Penticton Vees, Jost and teammate Dante Fabbro were named to Canada's Under-18 to compete at the 2015 Ivan Hlinka Memorial Tournament. After winning a gold medal at the tournament, he collected his second medal of the year with Canada West at the 2015 World Junior A Challenge and was named Team MVP.

Jost captained Canada at the 2016 IIHF World U18 Championships in Grand Forks, North Dakota, where he led the tournament in scoring with 15 points in seven games. His points total established a Canadian record at that event, surpassing the previous mark set by Connor McDavid (14) in 2013. Despite placing out of the medals, Jost was selected as the tournament's “Best Forward” and was named to the All-Star Team. On April 30, 2018, Jost was a late addition to Team Canada's senior roster to compete at the 2018 IIHF World Championship. After sitting out as a healthy scratch for the opening round-robin game, Jost drew into the lineup and played his first game at the senior level, scoring two goals and an assist in a 10-0 blowout victory over South Korea on May 6, 2018. Jost played the remainder of the tournament with Nicolas Roy and teammate Fabbro as Canada placed fourth overall.

On May 10, 2019, Jost was again a late inclusion to Team Canada at the 2019 IIHF World Championship, joining the squad following the Avalanche's second round defeat in the post-season. He played his first game in Slovakia, registering two assists in an 8–0 victory over Great Britain on May 12. Jost helped Canada progress through to the playoff rounds before losing the final to Finland to finish with the silver medal on May 26, 2019.

== Career statistics ==
=== Regular season and playoffs ===
			Regular season					Playoffs
Season	Team	League	GP	G	A	Pts	PIM	GP	G	A	Pts	PIM
2013–14	Okanagan Rockets	BCMML	36	44	44	88	65	7	9	9	18	14
2013–14	Penticton Vees	BCHL	3	0	0	0	0	—	—	—	—	—
2014–15	Penticton Vees	BCHL	46	23	22	45	16	21	10	4	14	6
2015–16	Penticton Vees	BCHL	48	42	62	104	43	11	6	8	14	4
2016–17	North Dakota Fighting Hawks	NCHC	33	16	19	35	44	—	—	—	—	—
2016–17	Colorado Avalanche	NHL	6	1	0	1	0	—	—	—	—	—
2017–18	Colorado Avalanche	NHL	65	12	10	22	26	6	0	1	1	0
2017–18	San Antonio Rampage	AHL	5	1	1	2	0	—	—	—	—	—
2018–19	Colorado Avalanche	NHL	70	11	15	26	14	12	3	1	4	0
2018–19	Colorado Eagles	AHL	8	4	1	5	2	—	—	—	—	—
2019–20	Colorado Avalanche	NHL	67	8	15	23	22	12	1	0	1	8
2020–21	Colorado Avalanche	NHL	54	7	10	17	24	10	2	2	4	4
2021–22	Colorado Avalanche	NHL	59	6	8	14	30	—	—	—	—	—
2021–22	Minnesota Wild	NHL	21	2	4	6	4	6	0	0	0	4
2022–23	Minnesota Wild	NHL	12	0	3	3	11	—	—	—	—	—
2022–23	Buffalo Sabres	NHL	59	7	15	22	23	—	—	—	—	—
2023–24	Buffalo Sabres	NHL	43	3	3	6	10	—	—	—	—	—
2023–24	Rochester Americans	AHL	25	4	10	14	18	—	—	—	—	—
2024–25	Chicago Wolves	AHL	14	4	5	9	12	—	—	—	—	—
2024–25	Carolina Hurricanes	NHL	39	4	5	9	33	—	—	—	—	—
2025–26	Nashville Predators	NHL	69	8	8	16	30	—	—	—	—	—
NHL totals			564	69	96	165	227	46	6	4	10	16

=== International ===
Year	Team	Event	Result	GP	G	A	Pts	PIM
2014	Canada White	U17	5th	5	1	2	3	0
2015	Canada	IH18	1st place, gold medalist(s)	4	3	0	3	0
2016	Canada	U18	4th	7	6	9	15	2
2017	Canada	WJC	2nd place, silver medalist(s)	7	1	3	4	6
2018	Canada	WC	4th	9	4	2	6	4
2019	Canada	WC	2nd place, silver medalist(s)	8	0	2	2	0
Junior totals				23	11	14	25	8
Senior totals				17	4	4	8	4

== Awards and honours ==
Award	Year	Ref
BCHL
All-Rookie Team	2015	
Vern Dye Memorial Trophy (MVP)	2016	
CJHL Top forward	2016	
CJHL MVP	2016	
College
NCHC All-Rookie Team	2017	
NCHC All-Tournament Team	2017	
International
World Junior A Challenge Canada West MVP	2015	
WJC-U18 All-Star Team	2016	
WJC-U18 Best Forward	2016	

Awards and achievements
Preceded by Mikko Rantanen	Colorado Avalanche first-round draft pick 2016	Succeeded by Cale Makar
