= 2021 NHL expansion draft =

NHL player selection draft

General information
- Date: July 21, 2021
- Location: Gas Works Park; Seattle, Washington, U.S.

Overview
- League: National Hockey League
- Expansion team: Seattle Kraken
- Expansion season: 2021–22

The 2021 NHL expansion draft was an expansion draft that was conducted by the National Hockey League (NHL) on July 21, 2021, at Gas Works Park in Seattle, Washington. The draft took place to fill the roster of the league's expansion team for the 2021–22 season, the Seattle Kraken.

The Kraken were approved to join the NHL in 2018, and they officially joined the league in the beginning of 2021. Prior to the draft, the Kraken had an exclusive three-day free agent signing period, in which they signed Adam Larsson, Jamie Oleksiak, and Chris Driedger, all of whom would be counted as selections by the Kraken in the draft. The draft itself followed the same rules as the 2017 NHL expansion draft, held for the Vegas Golden Knights, in which 30 of the league's 31 teams (the Golden Knights being exempt) released lists of protected players, and the Kraken selected 30 players, one from each. Out of the 30, 25 players ultimately ended up playing for the team.

== Background ==
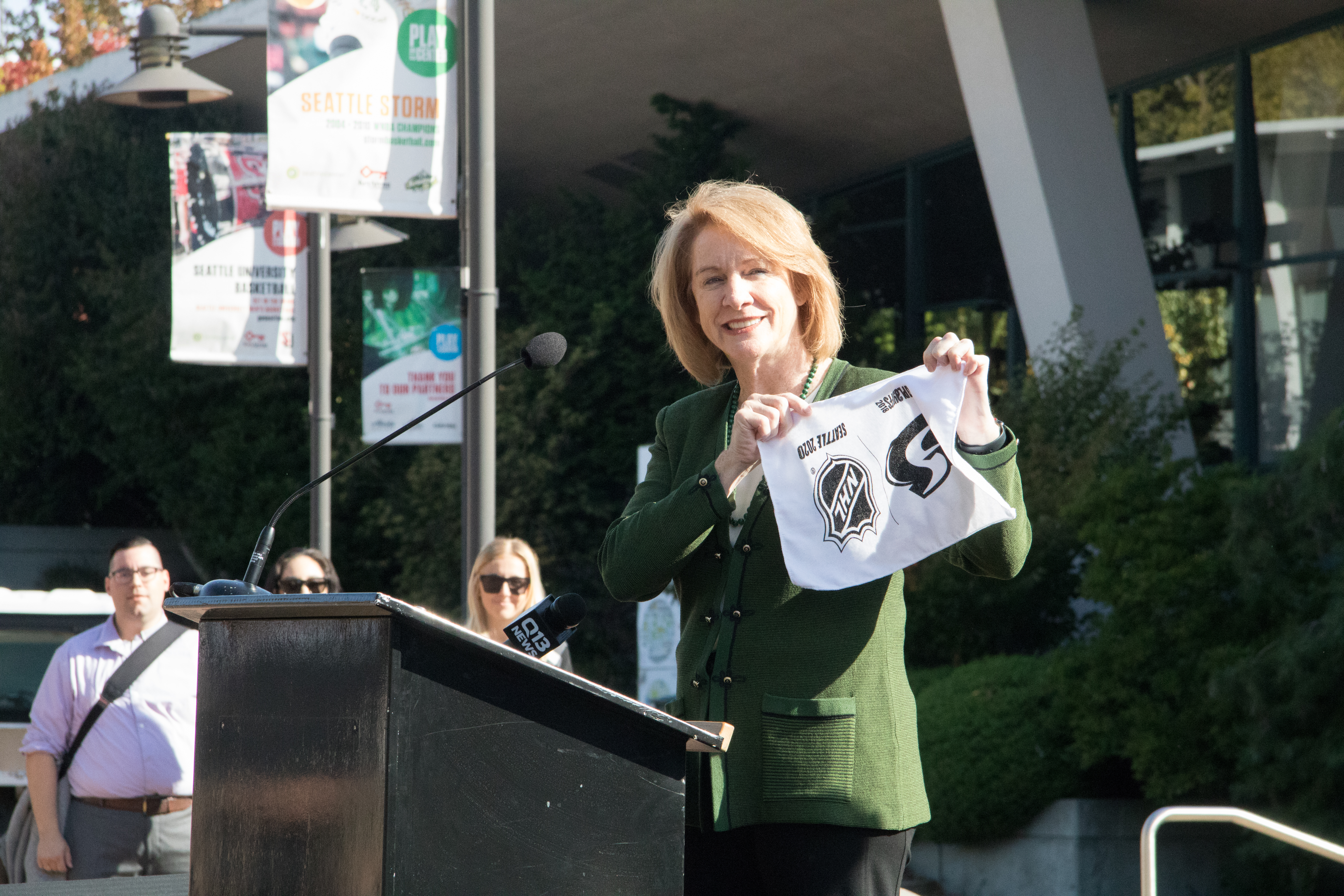
Seattle mayor Jenny Durkan celebrating the city's expansion team in September 2018

On December 4, 2017, the NHL Board of Governors agreed to consider an expansion application from Seattle for a new NHL team, with an expansion fee set at US$650 million. On February 13, 2018, the Oak View Group filed an application with the NHL for an expansion team and paid a $10 million application fee. On December 4, the NHL Board of Governors voted unanimously to approve the addition of Seattle's expansion team into the league.

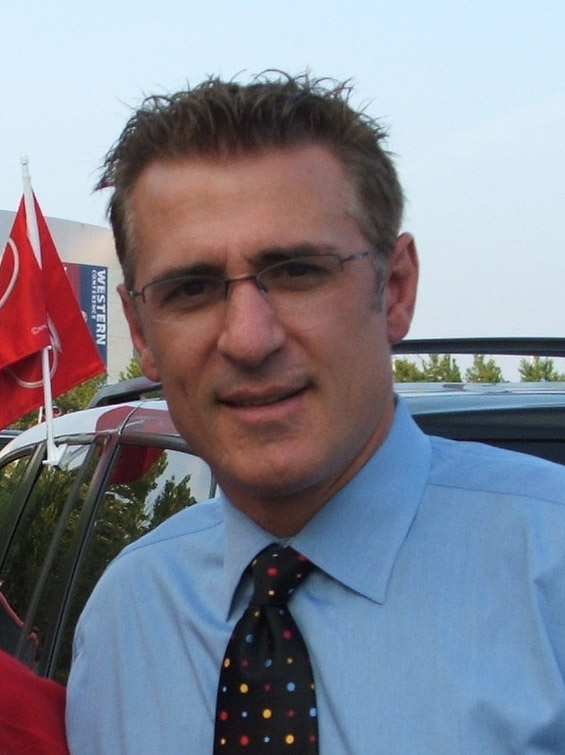
Ron Francis was hired in 2019 to be the Seattle Kraken's inaugural general manager.

On July 18, 2019, the organization hired Ron Francis to serve as their general manager to initiate operations for the team. As general manager, Francis was given responsibility for managing all of the club's hockey operations, including facets like player personnel, coaching staff, scouting, and minor league operations. Francis later stated that three things he wanted to prioritize in the team's roster were speed, character, and competitiveness. In July 2020, the franchise announced their team name—the Seattle Kraken—as well as their team colors, branding, and home jersey.

On April 30, 2021, the franchise paid the final installment of the US$650 million expansion fee, officially making the Seattle Kraken the 32nd team of the NHL. On May 12, the Kraken signed their first player—Luke Henman—to a three-year, entry-level contract. In June, the Kraken named Dave Hakstol as their inaugural head coach.

== Rules ==
Seattle followed the same rules for the draft as the Vegas Golden Knights in the 2017 NHL expansion draft, with the provision that Vegas was exempt from losing a player, a deal made between the team and the league in 2016, in exchange for forgoing a share of the Kraken's expansion fee. The 30 other teams submitted their lists of protected players on July 18. Teams could protect eight skaters and a goaltender, or seven forwards, three defensemen, and a goaltender; and they had to expose at least two forwards and one defenseman who were under contract for the 2021–22 season and had played in at least 27 games in the 2020–21 season, or more than 54 games in the 2019–20 and 2020–21 seasons combined. Teams also had to expose a goaltender under contract for the 2021–22 season or who would be a restricted free agent (with a qualifying offer received) in 2021. Teams were required to protect any contracted players with no-move clauses (NMCs) with one of the team's slots for protected players, unless:

1. The contract expired on July 28, 2021, in which case the NMC was considered void for the draft.
2. The player had an NMC continuing past July 28, 2021, was deemed to have a career-threatening injury, and was thus declared exempt from selection and use of a protection slot.
3. The player with an NMC waived his no-movement clause for the expansion draft.

Any player picked in the expansion draft could not have his contract bought out until after the completion of the 2021–22 season.

At least twenty of the thirty players selected by Seattle had to be under contract for the 2021–22 season, and the team was required to select a minimum of fourteen forwards, nine defensemen, and three goaltenders. Furthermore, the 2021–22 salaries of the thirty players selected (as measured in terms of what is counted against the salary cap) had to add up to between 60% and 100% of the 2020–21 salary cap (i.e., the full nominal cap, not the prorated cap for the shortened 56-game season that was played). Seattle was granted a window prior to the draft from July 18 to 21 to sign any unprotected pending free agent (restricted or unrestricted, one per team). Teams that lost a player to Seattle during the signing window did not have a player selected from its roster during this draft as the signed player counted as Seattle's selection.

== Protected players ==
On July 18, the protected player list, a list of players whom the Kraken were not allowed to select during the draft, was released.

Key

* player was protected for contractual reasons

=== Eastern Conference ===
Atlantic Division
Position	Boston	Buffalo	Detroit	Florida	Montreal	Ottawa	Tampa Bay	Toronto
Forwards	Patrice Bergeron*	Rasmus Asplund	Tyler Bertuzzi	Aleksander Barkov	Josh Anderson	Drake Batherson	Anthony Cirelli	Mitch Marner
Forwards	Charlie Coyle*	Anders Bjork	Adam Erne	Sam Bennett	Joel Armia	Connor Brown	Nikita Kucherov*	Auston Matthews
Forwards	Jake DeBrusk	Jack Eichel	Robby Fabbri	Anthony Duclair	Jake Evans	Logan Brown	Brayden Point	William Nylander
Forwards	Trent Frederic	Casey Mittelstadt	Dylan Larkin	Patric Hornqvist	Brendan Gallagher*	Nick Paul	Steven Stamkos*	John Tavares*
Forwards	Brad Marchand*	Victor Olofsson	Michael Rasmussen	Jonathan Huberdeau*	Jesperi Kotkaniemi	Brady Tkachuk		
Forwards	David Pastrnak*	Sam Reinhart	Givani Smith	Mason Marchment	Artturi Lehkonen	Austin Watson		
Forwards	Craig Smith	Tage Thompson	Jakub Vrana	Carter Verhaeghe	Tyler Toffoli	Colin White		
Defensemen	Brandon Carlo	Rasmus Dahlin	Filip Hronek	Aaron Ekblad*	Ben Chiarot	Thomas Chabot	Erik Cernak	T. J. Brodie
Defensemen	Matt Grzelcyk	Henri Jokiharju	Nick Leddy	Gustav Forsling	Joel Edmundson	Victor Mete	Victor Hedman*	Justin Holl
Defensemen	Charlie McAvoy	Rasmus Ristolainen	Gustav Lindstrom	MacKenzie Weegar	Jeff Petry*	Nikita Zaitsev	Ryan McDonagh	Jake Muzzin
Defensemen							Mikhail Sergachev	Morgan Rielly
Goaltender	Daniel Vladar	Linus Ullmark	Thomas Greiss	Sergei Bobrovsky	Jake Allen	Filip Gustavsson	Andrei Vasilevskiy*	Jack Campbell

Metropolitan Division
Position	Carolina	Columbus	New Jersey	NY Islanders	NY Rangers	Philadelphia	Pittsburgh	Washington
Forwards	Sebastian Aho	Cam Atkinson	Jesper Bratt	Mathew Barzal	Pavel Buchnevich	Nicolas Aube-Kubel	Teddy Blueger	Nicklas Backstrom*
Forwards	Jesper Fast	Oliver Bjorkstrand	Nico Hischier	Anthony Beauvillier	Filip Chytil	Sean Couturier	Jeff Carter	Lars Eller
Forwards	Warren Foegele	Boone Jenner	Janne Kuokkanen	Cal Clutterbuck	Chris Kreider*	Claude Giroux*	Sidney Crosby*	Evgeny Kuznetsov
Forwards	Jordan Staal*	Patrik Laine	Michael McLeod	Anders Lee	Artemi Panarin*	Kevin Hayes*	Jake Guentzel	Anthony Mantha
Forwards	Andrei Svechnikov	Gustav Nyquist	Yegor Sharangovich	Matt Martin	Kevin Rooney	Travis Konecny	Kasperi Kapanen	T. J. Oshie
Forwards	Teuvo Teravainen	Eric Robinson	Miles Wood	Brock Nelson	Ryan Strome	Scott Laughton	Evgeni Malkin*	Daniel Sprong
Forwards	Vincent Trocheck	Jack Roslovic	Pavel Zacha	Jean-Gabriel Pageau	Mika Zibanejad*	Oskar Lindblom	Bryan Rust	Tom Wilson
Defensemen	Brett Pesce	Vladislav Gavrikov	Ryan Graves	Adam Pelech	Libor Hajek	Ryan Ellis	Brian Dumoulin	John Carlson
Defensemen	Brady Skjei	Seth Jones	Damon Severson	Ryan Pulock	Ryan Lindgren	Ivan Provorov	Kris Letang*	Dmitry Orlov
Defensemen	Jaccob Slavin	Zach Werenski	Jonas Siegenthaler	Scott Mayfield	Jacob Trouba*	Travis Sanheim	Mike Matheson	Trevor van Riemsdyk
Goaltender	Alex Nedeljkovic	Joonas Korpisalo	Mackenzie Blackwood	Semyon Varlamov	Alexandar Georgiev	Carter Hart	Tristan Jarry	Ilya Samsonov

=== Western Conference ===
Central Division
Position	Arizona	Chicago	Colorado	Dallas	Minnesota	Nashville	St. Louis	Winnipeg
Forwards	Lawson Crouse	Henrik Borgstrom	Andre Burakovsky	Jamie Benn*	Joel Eriksson Ek	Filip Forsberg	Ivan Barbashev	Kyle Connor
Forwards	Christian Dvorak	Alex DeBrincat	Tyson Jost	Radek Faksa	Kevin Fiala	Tanner Jeannot	Jordan Kyrou	Andrew Copp
Forwards	Conor Garland	Brandon Hagel	Nazem Kadri	Denis Gurianov	Marcus Foligno	Luke Kunin	Ryan O'Reilly	Pierre-Luc Dubois
Forwards	Clayton Keller	David Kampf	Nathan MacKinnon	Roope Hintz	Jordan Greenway		David Perron	Nikolaj Ehlers
Forwards	Phil Kessel*	Patrick Kane*	Valeri Nichushkin	Joe Pavelski	Ryan Hartman		Brayden Schenn	Adam Lowry
Forwards	Johan Larsson	Dylan Strome	Logan O'Connor	Alexander Radulov*	Nico Sturm		Oskar Sundqvist	Mark Scheifele
Forwards	Nick Schmaltz	Jonathan Toews*	Mikko Rantanen	Tyler Seguin*	Mats Zuccarello*		Robert Thomas	Blake Wheeler*
Defensemen	Kyle Capobianco	Caleb Jones	Sam Girard	Miro Heiskanen	Jonas Brodin*	Alexandre Carrier	Justin Faulk	Josh Morrissey
Defensemen	Jakob Chychrun	Connor Murphy	Cale Makar	John Klingberg	Matt Dumba	Mattias Ekholm	Torey Krug	Neal Pionk
Defensemen	Oliver Ekman-Larsson*	Riley Stillman	Devon Toews	Esa Lindell*	Jared Spurgeon*	Dante Fabbro	Colton Parayko	Logan Stanley
Defensemen						Roman Josi*		
Defensemen						Philippe Myers		
Goaltender	Darcy Kuemper	Kevin Lankinen	Philipp Grubauer	Anton Khudobin	Cam Talbot	Juuse Saros	Jordan Binnington	Connor Hellebuyck

Pacific Division
Position	Anaheim	Calgary	Edmonton	Los Angeles	San Jose	Seattle	Vancouver	Vegas
Forwards	Nicolas Deslauriers	Mikael Backlund	Josh Archibald	Lias Andersson	Rudolfs Balcers	Drafting	Brock Boeser	Exempt
Forwards	Max Jones	Dillon Dube	Leon Draisaitl	Viktor Arvidsson	Logan Couture	Drafting	Jason Dickinson	Exempt
Forwards	Isac Lundestrom	Johnny Gaudreau	Zack Kassian	Dustin Brown	Jonathan Dahlen	Drafting	Bo Horvat	Exempt
Forwards	Rickard Rakell	Elias Lindholm	Connor McDavid	Alex Iafallo	Tomas Hertl	Drafting	J. T. Miller	Exempt
Forwards	Jakob Silfverberg	Andrew Mangiapane	Ryan Nugent-Hopkins*	Adrian Kempe	Evander Kane	Drafting	Tyler Motte	Exempt
Forwards	Sam Steel	Sean Monahan	Jesse Puljujarvi	Anze Kopitar	Kevin Labanc	Drafting	Tanner Pearson	Exempt
Forwards	Troy Terry	Matthew Tkachuk	Kailer Yamamoto	Trevor Moore	Timo Meier	Drafting	Elias Pettersson	Exempt
Defensemen	Cam Fowler	Rasmus Andersson	Ethan Bear	Drew Doughty*	Brent Burns	Drafting	Olli Juolevi	Exempt
Defensemen	Hampus Lindholm	Noah Hanifin	Duncan Keith*	Matt Roy	Erik Karlsson*	Drafting	Tyler Myers	Exempt
Defensemen	Josh Manson	Christopher Tanev	Darnell Nurse	Sean Walker	Marc-Edouard Vlasic*	Drafting	Nate Schmidt	Exempt
Goaltender	John Gibson	Jacob Markstrom*	Stuart Skinner	Cal Petersen	Adin Hill	Drafting	Thatcher Demko	Exempt

== Pre-draft ==
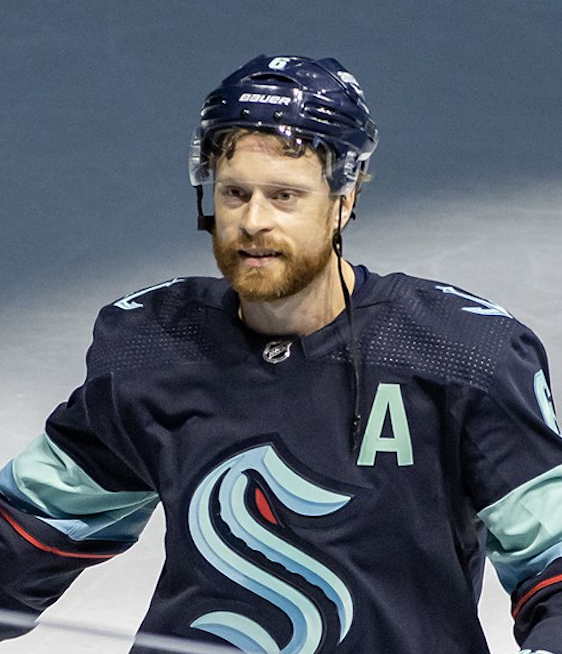
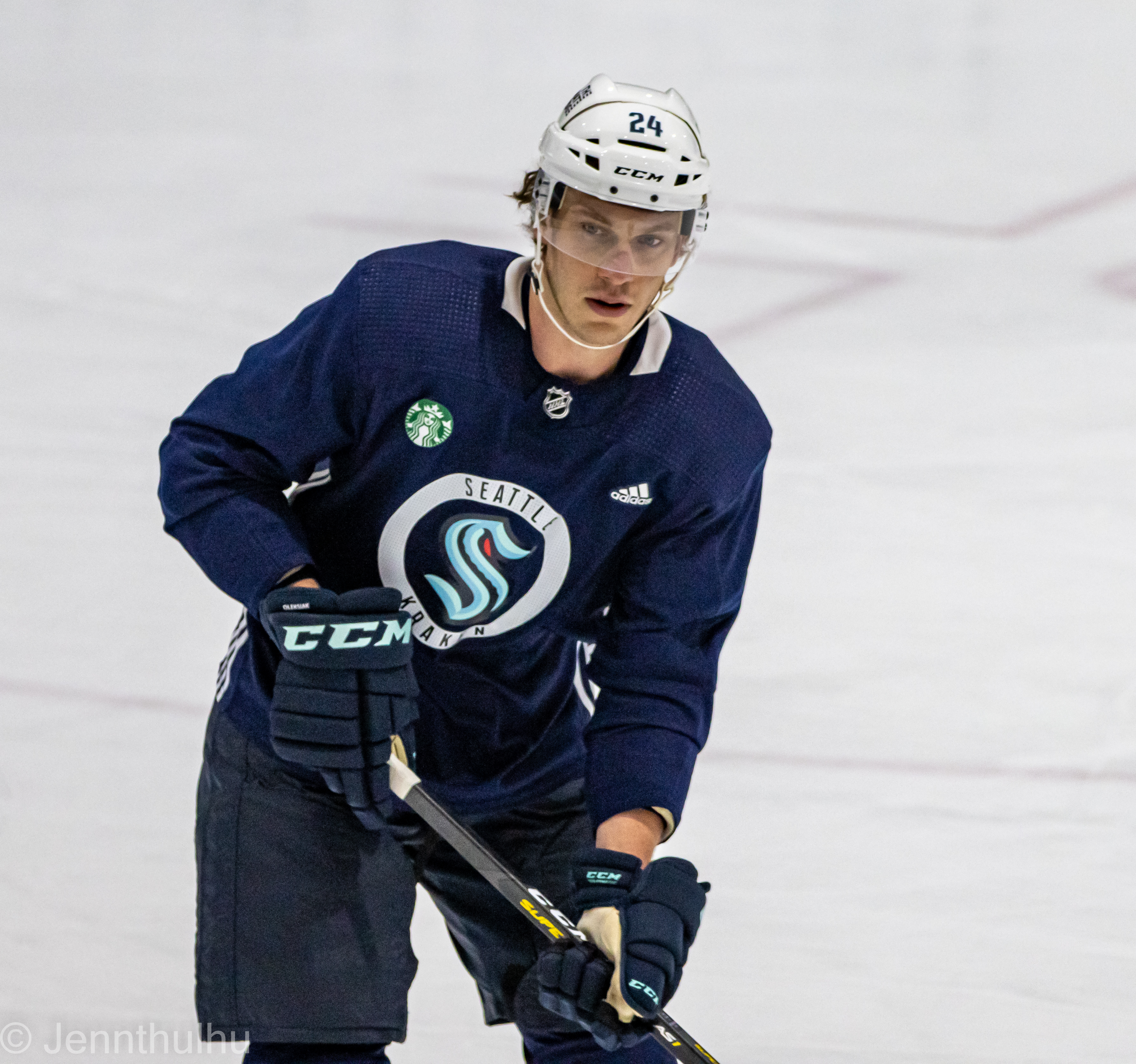
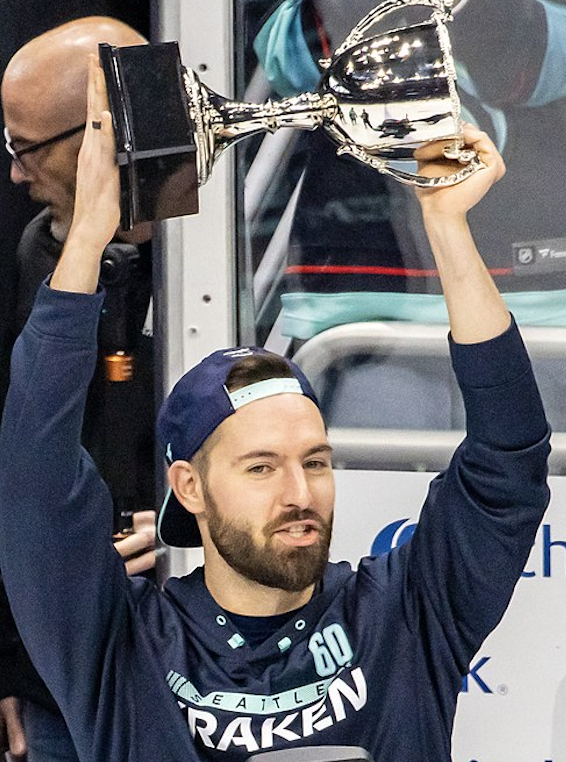
From left to right; Adam Larsson, Jamie Oleksiak, and Chris Driedger signed contracts with the Kraken before they were selected by the team during the 2021 NHL expansion draft.

On July 18, 2021, the period during which the Seattle Kraken could negotiate with unrestricted free agents began. On the morning of the draft day, July 21, the Kraken signed defensemen Adam Larsson and Jamie Oleksiak and goaltender Chris Driedger to a four-year US$16 million deal, a five-year US$23 million contract, and a three-year US$10.5 million deal, respectively. Larsson, Oleksiak, and Driedger would count as the pick from their respective teams (Edmonton Oilers, Dallas Stars, and Florida Panthers).

== Draft selections ==
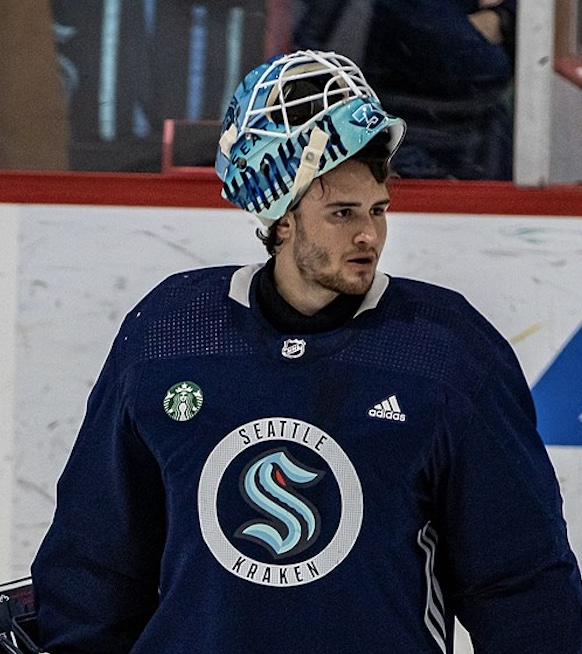
Goaltender Joey Daccord

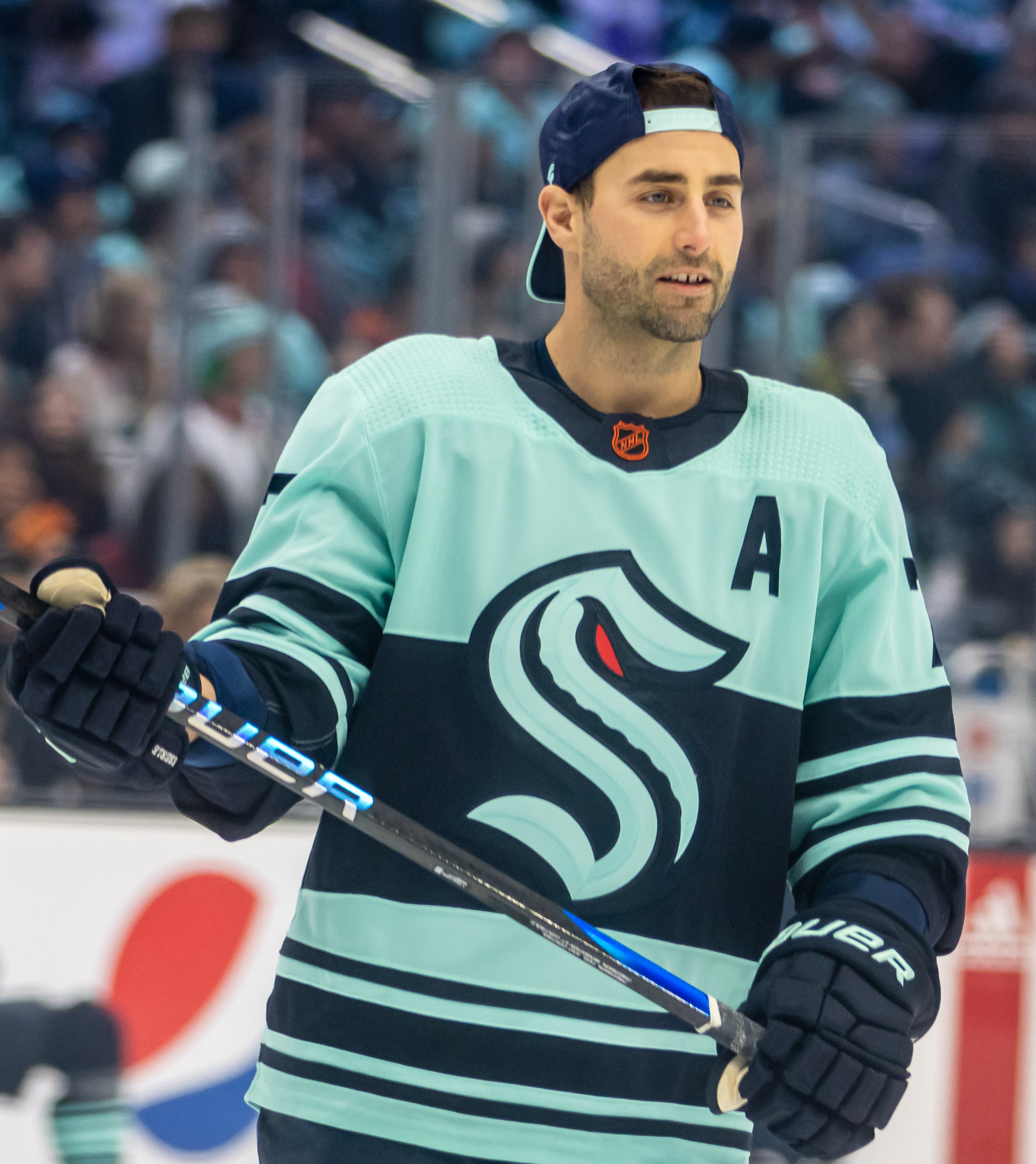
Right wing Jordan Eberle

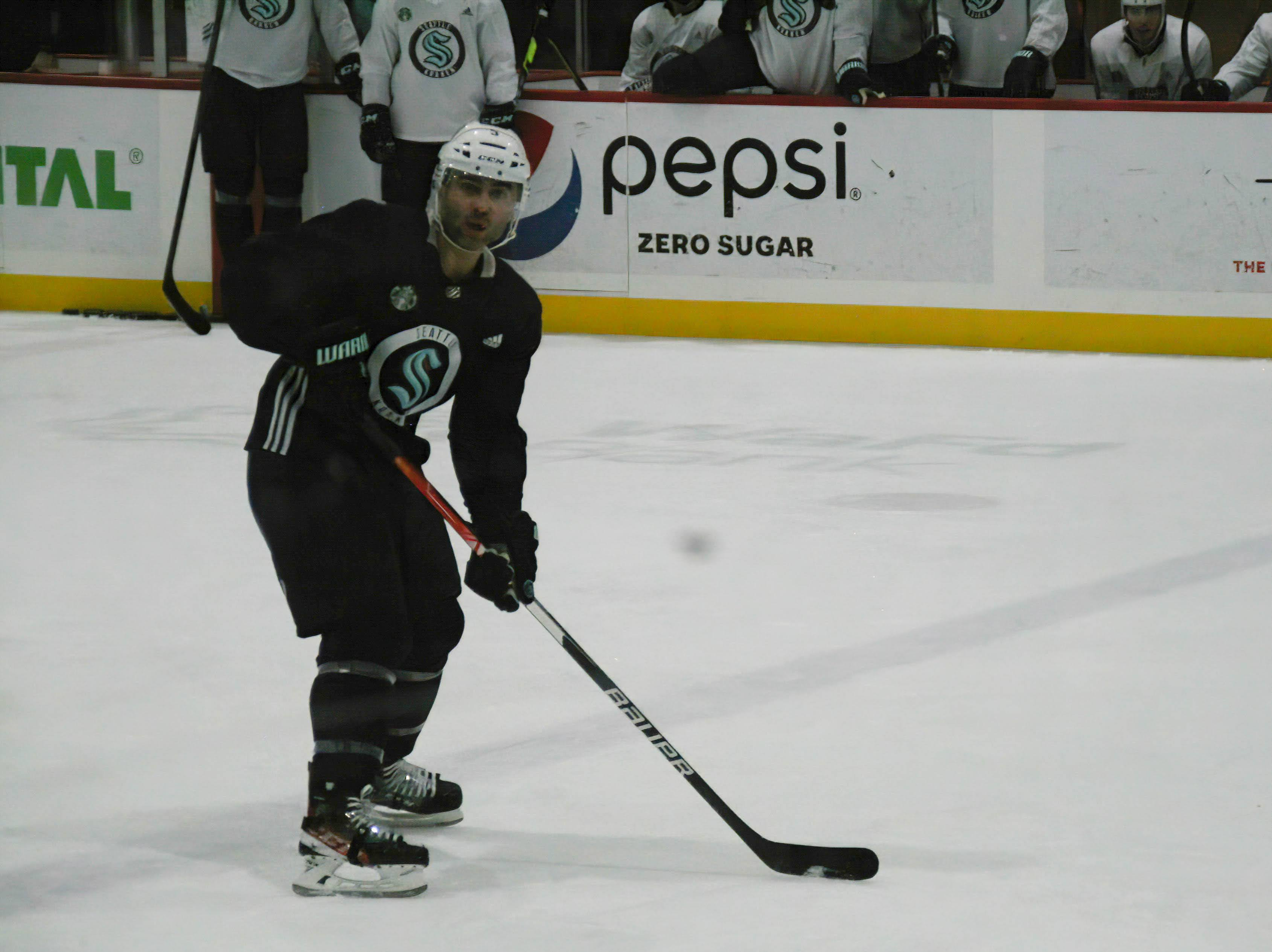
Defenseman Mark Giordano

Key of abbreviations
Abbreviation	Definition
LW	Left wing
C	Center
RW	Right wing
D	Defenseman
G	Goaltender

Expansion draft selections
Number	Player	Position	Team drafted from
1	Jeremy Lauzon	D	Boston Bruins
2	Will Borgen	D	Buffalo Sabres
3	Dennis Cholowski	D	Detroit Red Wings
4	Chris Driedger	G	Florida Panthers
5	Cale Fleury	D	Montreal Canadiens
6	Joey Daccord	G	Ottawa Senators
7	Yanni Gourde	C/LW	Tampa Bay Lightning
8	Jared McCann	LW/C	Toronto Maple Leafs
9	Morgan Geekie	RW/C	Carolina Hurricanes
10	Gavin Bayreuther	D	Columbus Blue Jackets
11	Nathan Bastian	RW	New Jersey Devils
12	Jordan Eberle	RW	New York Islanders
13	Colin Blackwell	C	New York Rangers
14	Carsen Twarynski	LW	Philadelphia Flyers
15	Brandon Tanev	LW	Pittsburgh Penguins
16	Vitek Vanecek	G	Washington Capitals
17	Tyler Pitlick	C	Arizona Coyotes
18	John Quenneville	C	Chicago Blackhawks
19	Joonas Donskoi	RW	Colorado Avalanche
20	Jamie Oleksiak	D	Dallas Stars
21	Carson Soucy	D	Minnesota Wild
22	Calle Jarnkrok	RW	Nashville Predators
23	Vince Dunn	D	St. Louis Blues
24	Mason Appleton	C	Winnipeg Jets
25	Haydn Fleury	D	Anaheim Ducks
26	Mark Giordano	D	Calgary Flames
27	Adam Larsson	D	Edmonton Oilers
28	Kurtis MacDermid	D	Los Angeles Kings
29	Alexander True	C	San Jose Sharks
30	Kole Lind	RW	Vancouver Canucks

== Post-draft ==
On July 22, 2021, the Kraken made their first trade in team history, giving expansion draft pick Tyler Pitlick to the Calgary Flames in exchange for a fourth-round pick in the 2022 NHL entry draft. Five days later, the Kraken traded draft pick Kurtis MacDermid to the Colorado Avalanche in exchange for a fourth-round pick in the 2023 NHL entry draft. On July 28, the first day of free agency, the Kraken traded draft pick Vitek Vanecek back to the Washington Capitals, from whom he had initially been selected, in exchange for a second-round draft pick in 2023. That same day, draft pick Gavin Bayreuther re-signed as a free agent with his former team, the Columbus Blue Jackets. On September 5, draft pick John Quenneville signed as a free agent with ZSC Lions of the Swiss National League. All other expansion draft players would feature for the Kraken at least once during their inaugural season.

== Guest appearances ==
Several Seattle sportspeople and celebrities made appearances to announce the draft picks, including basketball players Shawn Kemp and Gary Payton of the Seattle SuperSonics, as well as former Sonics coach Lenny Wilkens; Marshawn Lynch and Bobby Wagner of the Seattle Seahawks; basketball player Sue Bird of the Seattle Storm via video conference as she was in Tokyo for the 2020 Summer Olympics; baseball player Kyle Lewis of the Seattle Mariners; soccer player Brad Evans and Jordan Morris of Seattle Sounders FC; Kraken scout Cammi Granato, and Seattle-based rapper Macklemore. Kraken season ticket holders and construction workers from Climate Pledge Arena were also featured during the event; Kraken co-owner Jerry Bruckheimer and general manager Ron Francis also participated.

== See also ==
- 2020–21 NHL transactions
- 2021–22 NHL transactions
- 2021 NHL entry draft
- 2021–22 Seattle Kraken season
