= Dennis Cholowski =

Canadian ice hockey player (born 1998)

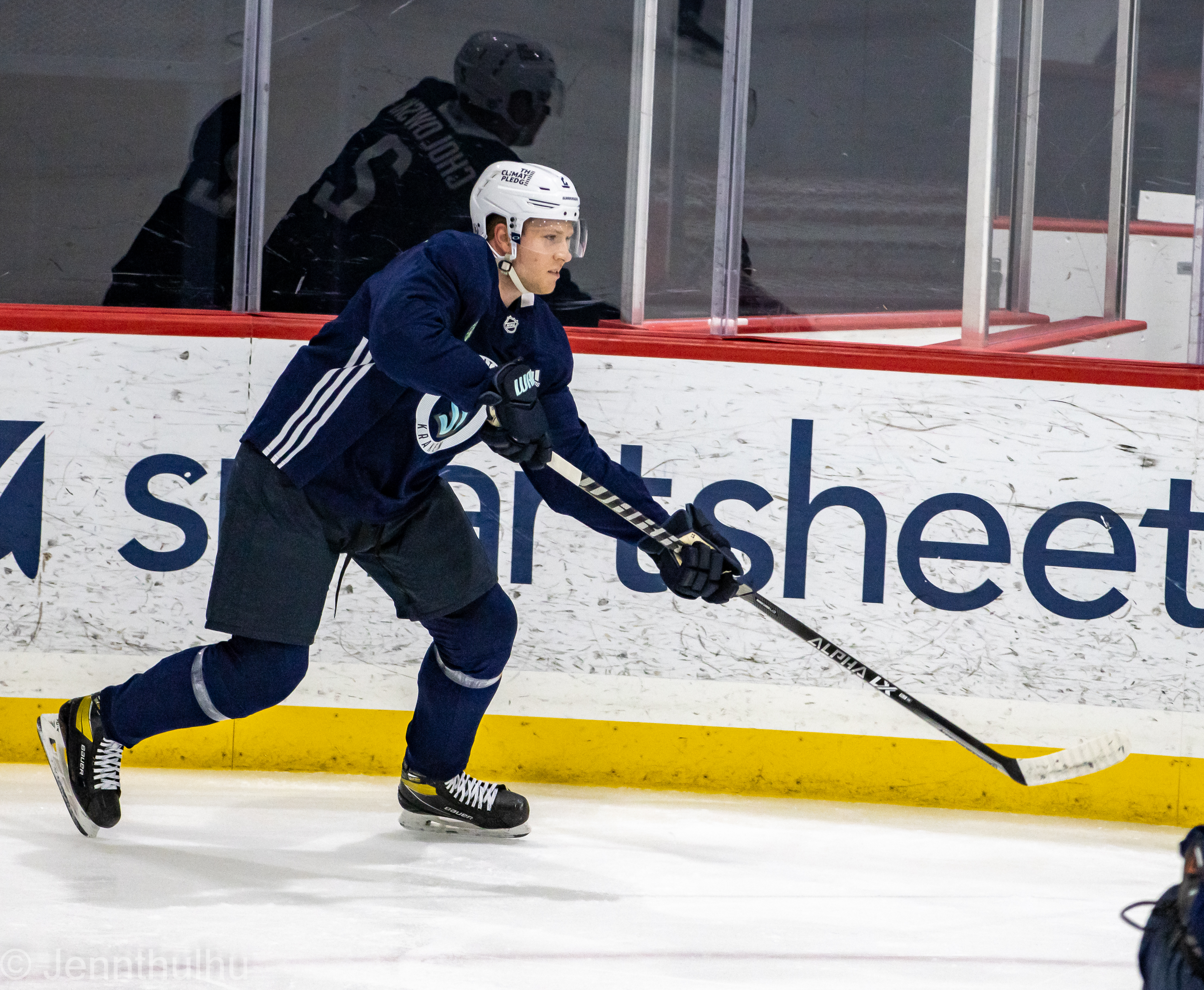
- Cholowski with the Seattle Kraken in 2022
- Born: February 15, 1998 (age 28) Langley, British Columbia, Canada
- Height: 6 ft 2 in (188 cm)
- Weight: 210 lb (95 kg; 15 st 0 lb)
- Position: Defence
- Shoots: Left
- NHL team (P) Cur. team Former teams: New York Rangers; Hartford Wolf Pack (AHL); Detroit Red Wings; Washington Capitals; Seattle Kraken; New York Islanders; New Jersey Devils
- NHL draft: 20th overall, 2016; Detroit Red Wings
- Playing career: 2017–present

Dennis Cholowski (born February 15, 1998) is a Canadian professional ice hockey player who is a defenceman for the Hartford Wolfpack of the American Hockey League (AHL) while under contract to the New York Rangers of the National Hockey League (NHL). Cholowski was drafted 20th overall by the Detroit Red Wings in the 2016 NHL entry draft.

In his native British Columbia, Cholowski began playing hockey locally, and he eventually joined the Chilliwack Chiefs of the British Columbia Hockey League, for whom he played from 2013 to 2016. After being drafted by the Red Wings, Cholowski played in the National Collegiate Hockey Conference with St. Cloud State University. The next season, he joined the Western Hockey League's Prince George Cougars, where he played until he was traded to the Portland Winterhawks.

Cholowski then joined the Red Wings' American Hockey League (AHL) affiliate, the Grand Rapids Griffins, in 2017. In 2018, he made his NHL debut with the Red Wings, and he continued to play with both the Red Wings and the Griffins until 2021. That year, Cholowski was selected by the Seattle Kraken in the 2021 NHL expansion draft. At the beginning of his first season with the Kraken, he was placed on waivers and claimed by the Washington Capitals, with whom he played seven games, until he was placed on waivers once again and claimed by the Kraken, whom he played for alongside the AHL's Charlotte Checkers. Following that season, Cholowski signed with the New York Islanders, playing with them and their AHL affiliate, the Bridgeport Islanders, from 2022 until he was traded to the New Jersey Devils in 2025.

Cholowski represented Canada West at the 2015 World Junior A Challenge. He registered two assists, helping the team to a gold medal.

== Playing career ==
=== Junior ===
Growing up in Langley, British Columbia, Cholowski played bantam hockey in his hometown until he was selected by the Prince George Cougars of the Western Hockey League (WHL) in the 10th round, 200th overall, of the 2013 WHL bantam draft. Following his selection, Cholowski stepped up his game and joined the Chilliwack Chiefs of the British Columbia Hockey League (BCHL). During the 2013–14 season, his first with the team, Cholowski only played one game with the Chiefs.

In 2014, Cholowski committed to play for the St. Cloud State Huskies, part of the National Collegiate Hockey Conference. In the 2014–15 season, through regular season and playoffs, he put up four goals and 30 assists through 67 games. During the 2015–16 season, Cholowski recorded 12 goals and 28 assists for 40 points through 50 games for the Chiefs. His point total led all Chiefs' defencemen, and it placed him fifth among BCHL defencemen. In the playoffs, he finished first in the league in points by a defenceman with 15, from four goals and 11 assists, in 20 games. Due to his performance, he was named to the 2016 BCHL Second All-Star Team.

On June 24, 2016, at the 2016 NHL entry draft, the Detroit Red Wings traded Pavel Datsyuk's contact' US$7,500,000 annual value and the draft's 16th overall pick to the Arizona Coyotes in exchange for the 20th overall and 53rd overall picks. The Red Wings used the 20th overall pick they acquired to select Cholowski. His selection made him the highest-drafted St. Cloud State commit, surpassing Matt Cullen's 35th overall selection in 1996.

=== College and major junior ===
During the 2016–17 season, his first season with the St. Cloud State Huskies, Cholowski recorded one goal and 11 assists in 36 games. On April 5, 2017, the Detroit Red Wings signed Cholowski to a three-year, entry-level contract. After the season, on April 7, Cholowski was signed to an amateur tryout offer by the Grand Rapids Griffins, the Detroit Red Wings' American Hockey League (AHL) affiliate. He played his first professional game with the Griffins on April 15, their last regular season game, in a 5–1 victory over the Milwaukee Admirals. Cholowski would remain a healthy scratch for the Griffins during their playoff run.

Before the 2017–18 season, on September 26, 2017, Cholowski was assigned to the Prince George Cougars of the WHL. On November 21, 2017, Cholowski was named captain of the Cougars. On January 10, 2018, Cholowski was traded to the Portland Winterhawks, along with Ty Taylor, in exchange for Ilijah Colina, Connor Bowie, and WHL bantam draft picks, including a first-round pick in 2020, a second-round pick in 2018, a second-round pick in 2019, and a third-round pick in 2020. Before being traded, he recorded 13 goals and 26 assists in 39 games for the Cougars, ranking second in the WHL in goals by a defenceman, and sixth in points. Cholowski finished this time with the Winterhawks with one goal and 26 assists in 32 games. That season, he ranked eighth in points among the WHL's top defencemen, tied for sixth in goals and eighth in assists. In 12 playoff games with the Winterhawks, Cholowski recorded two goals and five assists. On April 18, 2018, Cholowski was reassigned to the Grand Rapids Griffins. He played in one playoff game on April 25 against the Manitoba Moose, registering only one shot on goal.

=== Professional ===
==== Detroit Red Wings ====
During the 2018–19 season, after participating in the Detroit Red Wings' training camp, Cholowski made the team's opening night roster. He made his NHL debut for the Red Wings on October 4, 2018, and scored his first career NHL goal in the second period against Joonas Korpisalo of the Columbus Blue Jackets. On February 14, 2019, Cholowski was assigned to the Grand Rapids Griffins. Before being assigned to the Griffins, he recorded seven goals and nine assists in 52 games for the Red Wings, ranking third in points among rookie defencemen in the NHL. With the Griffins, Cholowski recorded 12 assists through 25 games.

Cholowski was once again named to the Red Wings' opening roster for the 2019–20 season. On December 11, 2019, he was assigned to the Griffins. Before the move, he had collected two goals and six assists for eight points through 21 games, tied for second place among Red Wings defencemen in scoring. In 30 games with the Griffins, Cholowski notched three goals and 10 assists before AHL play was stopped due to the COVID-19 pandemic. His season with the Red Wings ended with him not collecting any more points than he had before his reassignment, ending with 36 games played and a -26 plus–minus rating.

During the shortened 2020–21 season, in January 2021, Cholowski made the Red Wings' taxi squad, taxi squads being a safety measure put in place by the NHL for that season. On February 1, he, along with fellow taxi squad members Chase Pearson and Gustav Lindstrom, was assigned to the Griffins. With the Griffins, Cholowski totaled three goals and seven assists through 13 games. In Detroit, he collected one goal and two assists in 16 games.

==== Seattle Kraken and Washington Capitals ====
On July 18, 2021, the Red Wings released their protected player list for the 2021 NHL expansion draft, being held for the Seattle Kraken, on which Cholowski was not featured. On July 21, he was selected by the Kraken in the draft from the Red Wings. On September 7, he signed a one-year, US$900,000 deal with the Kraken. On October 12, Cholowski was named to the Kraken's opening roster for the 2021–22 season. The next day, he was placed on waivers, and the day after that, he was claimed by the Washington Capitals. During his four months with the Capitals, Cholowski featured in just seven games, registering one assist and three shots on goal.

On February 8, 2022, Cholowski was waived by the Capitals, and the next day, he was subsequently re-claimed by the Kraken. He was immediately reassigned by the Kraken to join the Charlotte Checkers, their AHL affiliate. In 31 games with the Checkers, Cholowski tallied three goals and 15 assists before he was recalled by the Kraken on April 25. After the Kraken's season ended, he was sent back to Charlotte, having collected two assists in four games with Seattle. Through six Calder Cup playoff games, Cholowski notched one assist.

==== New York Islanders and New Jersey Devils ====
On August 23, 2022, Cholowski, as a free agent, signed a two-year, entry-level contract with the New York Islanders. Cholowski played with the Islanders' AHL affiliate, the Bridgeport Islanders, for the beginning part of the season, until he was called up to New York on January 18, 2023. He played his first game with New York that same day, skating in 13:58 of a 4–1 loss to the Boston Bruins. After playing two games with New York, he was returned to Bridgeport on January 23. He scored his first goal with Bridgeport on February 18, the tying goal in a game against the Springfield Thunderbirds, which Bridgeport would win in overtime. That goal was his only one during the 2022–23 season; he finished with an additional 37 assists through 67 games, his point total leading all Bridgeport defencemen.

On October 6, 2023, Cholowski was placed on waivers to be assigned to Bridgeport, and he cleared them the next day to join the team. With Bridgeport during the 2023–24 season, Cholowski registered seven goals and 24 assists in 68 games. On April 23, 2024, Cholowski was assigned to New York's playoff roster. On June 24, as a restricted free agent, Cholowski re-signed with the Islanders in a one-year, entry-level deal after having been extended a qualifying offer.

Cholowski began the 2024–25 season with the Islanders, totaling three goals and seven assists through 33 games before being placed on waivers on February 20, 2025. He cleared waivers the next day, and scored one goal in six games. On March 7, Cholowski was traded by New York to the New Jersey Devils in exchange for Adam Beckman. With the Devils, Cholowski skated in six regular season games and two playoff games, with Game 2 of the first round on April 22 being his NHL playoff debut. Following the season, on July 1, Cholowski re-signed with the Devils for US$775,000 for one year.

==== New York Rangers ====
With his Devils contract up, Cholowski as a free agent opted to continue in the Metropolitan Division by signing a two-year, two-way contract with the New York Rangers for the 2026–27 season on July 2, 2026.

== International play ==
Medal record

Representing Canada West

Ice hockey

World Junior A Challenge
Gold medal – first place	2015 Cobourg & Whibty	

Cholowski participated at the 2015 World Junior A Challenge with Canada West, earning the gold medal. Cholowski collected two assists through four games during the tournament.

== Career statistics ==
=== Regular season and playoffs ===
			Regular season					Playoffs
Season	Team	League	GP	G	A	Pts	PIM	GP	G	A	Pts	PIM
2013–14	Chilliwack Chiefs	BCHL	1	0	0	0	0	—	—	—	—	—
2014–15	Chilliwack Chiefs	BCHL	55	4	23	27	4	12	0	7	7	0
2015–16	Chilliwack Chiefs	BCHL	50	12	28	40	16	20	4	11	15	4
2016–17	St. Cloud State	NCHC	36	1	11	12	14	—	—	—	—	—
2016–17	Grand Rapids Griffins	AHL	1	0	0	0	0	—	—	—	—	—
2017–18	Prince George Cougars	WHL	37	13	26	39	14	—	—	—	—	—
2017–18	Portland Winterhawks	WHL	32	1	26	27	18	12	5	2	7	6
2017–18	Grand Rapids Griffins	AHL	—	—	—	—	—	1	0	0	0	0
2018–19	Grand Rapids Griffins	AHL	25	0	12	12	12	5	0	2	2	2
2018–19	Detroit Red Wings	NHL	52	7	9	16	16	—	—	—	—	—
2019–20	Grand Rapids Griffins	AHL	30	3	10	13	8	—	—	—	—	—
2019–20	Detroit Red Wings	NHL	36	2	6	8	6	—	—	—	—	—
2020–21	Grand Rapids Griffins	AHL	13	3	7	10	6	—	—	—	—	—
2020–21	Detroit Red Wings	NHL	16	1	2	3	4	—	—	—	—	—
2021–22	Washington Capitals	NHL	7	0	1	1	2	—	—	—	—	—
2021–22	Charlotte Checkers	AHL	31	3	15	18	8	6	0	1	1	0
2021–22	Seattle Kraken	NHL	4	0	2	2	0	—	—	—	—	—
2022–23	Bridgeport Islanders	AHL	67	1	37	38	26	—	—	—	—	—
2022–23	New York Islanders	NHL	2	0	0	0	0	—	—	—	—	—
2023–24	Bridgeport Islanders	AHL	68	7	24	31	6	—	—	—	—	—
2024–25	New York Islanders	NHL	33	3	7	10	10	—	—	—	—	—
2024–25	Bridgeport Islanders	AHL	6	1	0	1	2	—	—	—	—	—
2024–25	New Jersey Devils	NHL	6	0	0	0	0	2	0	0	0	0
2025–26	Utica Comets	AHL	13	0	5	5	6	—	—	—	—	—
2025–26	New Jersey Devils	NHL	17	0	2	2	2	—	—	—	—	—
NHL totals			173	13	29	42	40	2	0	0	0	0

=== International ===
Year	Team	Event	Result	GP	G	A	Pts	PIM
2015	Canada West	WJAC	1st place, gold medalist(s)	4	0	2	2	0
Junior totals				4	0	2	2	0

== Awards and honors ==
Award	Year	Ref
Junior
BCHL Second All-Star Team	2016	

Awards and achievements
Preceded by Evgeny Svechnikov	Detroit Red Wings first-round draft pick 2016	Succeeded by Michael Rasmussen
