= 2014–15 BCHL season =

2014-15 BCHL Season
- League: British Columbia Hockey League
- Sport: Hockey
- Duration: Regular season 2014-09-19 - 2015-02-28; Playoffs; 2015-03-03 - 2015-04-17
- Teams: 16

Regular season
- Season champions: Penticton Vees
- Season MVP: Corey Mackin (Coquitlam Express)
- Top scorer: Corey Mackin (Coquitlam Express)

Playoffs
- Finals champions: Penticton Vees
- Runners-up: Nanaimo Clippers

BCHL seasons
- 2013–14 BCHL 2015–16 BCHL

The 2014-15 BCHL season was the 53rd season of the British Columbia Hockey League. (BCHL) The sixteen teams from the Interior, Island and Mainland divisions played 58 game schedules, starting with the 2014 BCHL Showcase in Chilliwack, BC from September 19 to 21, 2014.

In March, the top teams from each division played for the Fred Page Cup, the BCHL Championship, won by the Penticton Vees. Penticton moves on to compete in the Western Canadian Junior A championship, the Western Canada Cup in Fort McMurray, Alberta. If successful against the winners of the Alberta Junior Hockey League, Saskatchewan Junior Hockey League, Manitoba Junior Hockey League and the Western Canada Cup host, the champion and runner-up would then move on to play for the Canadian Junior Hockey League championship, the Royal Bank Cup, in Portage la Prairie, Manitoba.

== Changes ==
Map of BCHL, 2012–13 to 2014–15
Island Division
Mainland Division
Interior Division
- In conjunction with CJHL rule changes, any player being assessed a fighting major in a game will also be assessed a game misconduct.

== Standings ==
Note: GP = Games Played, W = Wins, L = Losses, T = Ties, OTL = Overtime Losses, Pts = Points

Interior Division
| Team | Centre | W–L–T-OTL | Points |
| Penticton Vees | Penticton, BC | 44-9-3-2 | 93 |
| Vernon Vipers | Vernon, BC | 36-18-1-3 | 76 |
| Merritt Centennials | Merritt, BC | 32-24-0-2 | 66 |
| West Kelowna Warriors | West Kelowna, BC | 29-21-0-8 | 66 |
| Salmon Arm Silverbacks | Salmon Arm, BC | 28-21-3-6 | 65 |
| Trail Smoke Eaters | Trail, BC | 19-33-0-6 | 44 |
Island Division
| Team | Centre | W–L–T-OTL | Points |
| Nanaimo Clippers | Nanaimo, BC | 37-16-0-5 | 79 |
| Victoria Grizzlies | Victoria, BC | 29-18-1-10 | 69 |
| Powell River Kings | Powell River, BC | 27-21-1-9 | 64 |
| Alberni Valley Bulldogs | Port Alberni, BC | 27-25-2-4 | 60 |
| Cowichan Valley Capitals | Duncan, BC | 20-33-2-3 | 45 |
Mainland Division
| Team | Centre | W–L–T-OTL | Points |
| Chilliwack Chiefs | Chilliwack, BC | 37-17-1-3 | 78 |
| Langley Rivermen | Langley Township, BC | 29-23-1-5 | 64 |
| Prince George Spruce Kings | Prince George, BC | 27-24-1-6 | 61 |
| Coquitlam Express | Coquitlam, BC | 25-28-1-4 | 55 |
| Surrey Eagles | White Rock, BC | 9-45-1-3 | 22 |

- Teams are listed on the official league website.
- Standings listed by eSportsDeskPro on the official league website.

== Scoring Leaders ==
GP = Games Played, G = Goals, A = Assists, P = Points, PIM = Penalties In Minutes

| Player | Team | GP | G | A | Pts | PIM |
|---|---|---|---|---|---|---|
| Corey Mackin | Coquitlam Express | 58 | 50 | 54 | 104 | 8 |
| Brett Supinski | Coquitlam Express | 58 | 48 | 50 | 98 | 49 |
| Dane Gibson | Victoria Grizzlies | 56 | 32 | 57 | 89 | 59 |
| Jake Lucchini | Trail Smoke Eaters | 58 | 35 | 47 | 82 | 32 |
| Jacob Pritchard | Powell River Kings | 54 | 39 | 37 | 76 | 54 |
| Jarid Lukosevicius | Powell River Kings | 55 | 33 | 40 | 73 | 28 |
| Liam Blackburn | West Kelowna Warriors | 55 | 22 | 51 | 73 | 34 |
| Jeremiah Luedtke | Prince George Spruce Kings | 58 | 21 | 46 | 67 | 48 |
| Brett Gruber | Victoria Grizzlies | 57 | 35 | 31 | 66 | 16 |
| Kevan Kilistoff | Langley Rivermen | 56 | 25 | 41 | 66 | 22 |

== Leading goaltenders ==
Note: GP = Games Played, Mins = Minutes Played, W = Wins, L = Losses, T = Ties, GA = Goals Against, SO = Shutouts, Sv% = Save Percentage, GAA = Goals Against Average. Regulation losses and overtime losses have been combined for total losses.

| Player | Team | GP | Mins | W | L | T | GA | SO | Sv% | GAA |
|---|---|---|---|---|---|---|---|---|---|---|
| Hunter Miska | Penticton Vees | 46 | 2775 | 34 | 9 | 3 | 87 | 5 | 0.931 | 1.88 |
| Danny Todosychuk | Vernon Vipers | 21 | 1188 | 11 | 9 | 0 | 51 | 3 | 0.911 | 2.58 |
| Guillaume Decelles | Nanaimo Clippers | 50 | 2915 | 34 | 14 | 0 | 126 | 2 | 0.926 | 2.59 |
| Jarrod Schamerhorn | Vernon Vipers | 41 | 2300 | 25 | 12 | 1 | 104 | 3 | 0.907 | 2.71 |
| Angus Redmond | Salmon Arm Silverbacks | 50 | 2959 | 24 | 23 | 2 | 134 | 5 | 0.910 | 2.72 |

== 2014-2015 BCHL Fred Page Cup Playoffs ==
=== Division Playoffs ===
Interior Division Semi-final
1 | Penticton | 4
4 | West Kelowna | 1
2 | Vernon | 4
3 | Merritt | 0

Interior Division Final
1 | Penticton | 4
2 | Vernon | 3

=== Interior Division Semifinal ===
==== (1) Penticton Vees vs. (4) West Kelowna Warriors ====
| March 3 | Penticton Vees | 3 – 4 | 2OT | West Kelowna Warriors | South Okanagan Events Centre |
| 7:10 - Tyson Jost (1); 19:06 - Demico Hannoun (1) | | First period | | Josh Bly (1) - 9:29; Brayden Gelsinger (1) - 17:19 |
| 17:57 - Lewis Zerter-Gossage (1) | | Second period | | No scoring |
| No scoring | | Third period | | Kristian Blumenschein (1) - 6:01 |
| No scoring | | Second overtime period | | Jason Cotton (1) - pp - 5:39 |
| Hunter Miska (34 saves / 38 shots) | | Goalie stats | | Scott Patton (52 saves / 55 shots) |

| March 4 | Penticton Vees | 3 – 2 | OT | West Kelowna Warriors | South Okanagan Events Centre |
| No scoring | | First period | | No scoring |
| No scoring | | Second period | | Nick Rutigliano (1) - 9:54; Andrew Johnson (1) - 14:17 |
| 1:41 - Matthew Serratore (1); 8:57 - pp - Demico Hannoun (2) | | Third period | | No scoring |
| 3:43 - Matthew Serratore (2) | | First overtime period | | No scoring |
| Hunter Miska (30 saves / 32 shots) | | Goalie stats | | Scott Patton (44 saves / 47 shots) |

| March 6 | West Kelowna Warriors | 3 – 4 | 3OT | Penticton Vees | Royal LePage Place |
| No scoring | | First period | | Jack Ramsey (1) - 0:16; Dakota Conroy (1) - 3:55; Tyson Jost (2) - 5:54 |
| 15:28 - Tanner Campbell (1) | | Second period | | No scoring |
| 2:18 - Kylar Hope (1); 6:45 - Rylan Yaremko (1) | | Third period | | No scoring |
| No scoring | | Third overtime period | | Mitch Newsome (1) - 9:37 |
| Stephen Heslop (47 saves / 51 shots) | | Goalie stats | | Hunter Miska (79 saves / 82 shots) |

| March 7 | West Kelowna Warriors | 2 – 3 | Penticton Vees | Royal LePage Place |
| No scoring | | First period | Gabe Bast (1) - 10:46 |
| 0:47 - Kristian Blumenschein (2); 8:56 - pp - Liam Blackburn (1) | | Second period | No scoring |
| No scoring | | Third period | 5:03 - Connor Chartier (1); 17:46 - Dakota Conroy (2) |
| Stephen Heslop (36 saves / 39 shots) | | Goalie stats | Hunter Miska (27 saves / 29 shots) |

| March 9 | Penticton Vees | 7 – 0 | West Kelowna Warriors | South Okanagan Events Centre |
| 11:40 - Matthew Serratore (3); 15:31 - Tyson Jost (3) | | First period | No scoring |
| 19:19 - Tyson Jost (4) | | Second period | No scoring |
| 8:48 - Riley Alferd (1); 9:07 - Patrick Newell (1); 18:02 - sh - Dakota Conroy (3) | | Third period | No scoring |
| Hunter Miska (29 saves / 29 shots) | | Goalie stats | Stephen Heslop (27 saves / 34 shots) |

| Penticton wins series 4 – 1 |

==== (2) Vernon Vipers vs. (3) Merritt Centennials ====
| March 3 | Vernon Vipers | 3 – 2 | OT | Merritt Centennials | Kal Tire Place |
| 17:00 - Colton McCarthy (1) | | First period | | John Schiavo (1) - 17:26 |
| 15:00 - Thomas Aldworth (1) | | Second period | | No scoring |
| No scoring | | Third period | | Gavin Gould (1) - pp - 18:02 |
| 3:00 - Anthony Latina (1) | | First overtime period | | No scoring |
| Danny Todosychuk (32 saves / 33 shots); Jarrod Schamerhorn (3 saves / 4 shots) | | Goalie stats | | Jonah Imoo (37 saves / 40 shots) |

| March 25 | Vernon Vipers | 2 – 1 | Merritt Centennials | Kal Tire Place |
| No scoring | | First period | Cole Chorney (1) - 10:00 |
| 11:35 - Luke Voltin (1); 16:26 - pp - Liam Finlay (1) | | Second period | No scoring |
| No scoring | | Third period | No scoring |
| Jarrod Schamerhorn (18 saves / 19 shots) | | Goalie stats | Jonah Imoo (39 saves / 41 shots) |

| March 27 | Merritt Centennials | 0 – 1 | Vernon Vipers | Nicola Valley Memorial Arena |
| No scoring | | First period | No scoring |
| No scoring | | Second period | Riley Brandt (1) - 2:00 |
| No scoring | | Third period | No scoring |
| Jonah Imoo (28 saves / 29 shots) | | Goalie stats | Jarrod Schamerhorn (24 saves / 24 shots) |

| March 29 | Merritt Centennials | 5 – 6 | Vernon Vipers | Nicola Valley Memorial Arena |
| 9:37 - Cole Arcuri (1); 14:36 - pp - Shane Poulsen (1) | | First period | Thomas Aldworth (2) - pp - 3:25; Blaine Caton (1) - 5:56 |
| 10:37 - pp - Diego Cuglietta (1) | | Second period | Taylor Dumonceaux (1) - 15:00 |
| 16:48 - Gavin Gould (2); 19:58 - Sam Johnson (1) | | Third period | Liam Finlay (2) - 9:04; Riley Brandt (2) - 18:25 |
| Jonah Imoo (25 saves / 31 shots) | | Goalie stats | Jarrod Schamerhorn (31 saves / 36 shots) |

| Vernon wins series 4 – 0 |

=== Interior Division Final ===
==== (1) Penticton Vees vs. (2) Vernon Vipers ====
| March 14 | Penticton Vees | 4 – 3 | 2OT | Vernon Vipers | South Okanagan Events Centre |
| 6:02 - Dante Fabbro (1); 14:39 - pp - Jack Ramsey (2) | | First period | | No scoring |
| 12:13 - pp - Dante Fabbro (2) | | Second period | | Anthony Latina (2) - 8:47; Thomas Aldworth (3) - 19:59 |
| No scoring | | Third period | | Ken Citron (1) - 10:58 |
| 2:11 - Connor Chartier (3) | | Second overtime period | | No scoring |
| Hunter Miska (32 saves / 35 shots) | | Goalie stats | | Jarrod Schamerhorn (32 saves / 36 shots) |

| March 15 | Penticton Vees | 5 – 2 | Vernon Vipers | South Okanagan Events Centre |
| 0:42 - Tyson Jost (5); 19:23 - Cam Amantea (1) | | First period | Liam Finlay (3) - pp - 7:48 |
| 0:57 - pp - Tyson Jost (6); 13:50 - Connor Chartier (4); 15:44 - Demico Hannoun (3) | | Second period | No scoring |
| No scoring | | Third period | Riley Brandt (3) - 16:47 |
| Hunter Miska (25 saves / 27 shots) | | Goalie stats | Jarrod Schamerhorn (37 saves / 42 shots) |

| March 17 | Vernon Vipers | 5 – 2 | Penticton Vees | Kal Tire Place |
| 15:47 - Riley Brandt (4); 17:43 - Thomas Aldworth (4); 18:13 - pp - Luke Shiplo (1) | | First period | Connor Chartier (5) - 0:48; Steen Cooper (1) - 3:00 |
| 6:29 - Liam Coughlin (1); 13:02 - Colton McCarthy (2) | | Second period | No scoring |
| No scoring | | Third period | No scoring |
| Danny Todosychuk (26 saves / 27 shots) | | Goalie stats | Hunter Miska (18 saves / 23 shots); Brendan Barry (3 saves / 3 shots) |

| March 18 | Vernon Vipers | 5 – 2 | Penticton Vees | Kal Tire Place |
| 15:01 - Blaine Caton (2); 18:21 - pp - Brandon Egli (1) | | First period | Riley Alferd (2) - 8:44 |
| No scoring | | Second period | Cody DePourcq (1) - 3:51 |
| 7:19 - Riley Guenther (2); 19:12 - sh - en - Liam Coughlin (2); 19:36 - sh - en - Liam Coughlin (3) | | Third period | No scoring |
| Danny Todosychuk (26 saves / 28 shots) | | Goalie stats | Hunter Miska (29 saves / 32 shots) |

| March 20 | Penticton Vees | 3 – 4 | 2OT | Vernon Vipers | South Okanagan Events Centre |
| No scoring | | First period | | Luke Voltin (2) - 16:01 |
| 8:57 - Riley Alferd (3); 18:13 - Steen Cooper (2); 18:20 - Connor Chartier (6) | | Second period | | No scoring |
| No scoring | | Third period | | Mackenzie Bauer (1) - 2:57; Riley Guenther (3) - 17:48 |
| No scoring | | Second overtime period | | Luke Voltin (3) - 5:37 |
| Hunter Miska (36 saves / 40 shots) | | Goalie stats | | Danny Todosychuk (48 saves / 51 shots) |

| March 21 | Vernon Vipers | 1 – 5 | Penticton Vees | Kal Tire Place |
| No scoring | | First period | Connor Chartier (7) - pp - 18:49 |
| 15:00 - Tyler Dumonceaux (2) | | Second period | Cam Amantea (2) - 4:05; Cam Amantea (3) - 8:32; Dakota Conroy (4) - 14:06 |
| No scoring | | Third period | Patrick Newell (2) - 6:29 |
| Danny Todosychuk (25 saves / 30 shots) | | Goalie stats | Hunter Miska (36 saves / 37 shots) |

| March 22 | Penticton Vees | 2 – 0 | Vernon Vipers | South Okanagan Events Centre |
| No scoring | | First period | No scoring |
| No scoring | | Second period | No scoring |
| Patrick Sexton (1) - 17:07; Matthew Serratore (4) - en - 19:56 | | Third period | No scoring |
| Hunter Miska (27 saves / 27 shots) | | Goalie stats | Danny Todosychuk (28 saves / 29 shots) |

| Penticton wins series 4 – 3 |

Island Division Semi-final
1 | Nanaimo | 4
4 | Alberni Valley | 3
2 | Victoria | 2
3 | Powell River | 4

Island Division Final
1 | Nanaimo | 4
3 | Powell River | 3

=== Island Division Semifinal ===
==== (1) Nanaimo Clippers vs. (4) Alberni Valley Bulldogs ====
| March 3 | Nanaimo Clippers | 6 – 1 | Alberni Valley Bulldogs | Frank Crane Arena |

| March 4 | Nanaimo Clippers | 3 – 1 | Alberni Valley Bulldogs | Frank Crane Arena |

| March 6 | Alberni Valley Bulldogs | 3 – 4 | Nanaimo Clippers | Weyerhaeuser Arena |

| March 7 | Alberni Valley Bulldogs | 5 – 4 | OT | Nanaimo Clippers | Weyerhaeuser Arena |

| March 9 | Nanaimo Clippers | 1 – 2 | Alberni Valley Bulldogs | Frank Crane Arena |

| March 10 | Alberni Valley Bulldogs | 4 – 3 | Nanaimo Clippers | Weyerhaeuser Arena |

| March 11 | Nanaimo Clippers | 3 – 1 | Alberni Valley Bulldogs | Frank Crane Arena |

| Nanaimo wins series 4 – 3 |

==== (2) Victoria Grizzlies vs. (3) Powell River Kings ====
| March 3 | Victoria Grizzlies | 2 – 7 | Powell River Kings | The Q Centre |
| No scoring | | First period | Nick Halagian (1) - 5:51 |
| 14:41 - pp - Brett Gruber (1) | | Second period | Ross Hnidy (1) - 12:10; Brent Lashuk (1) - 15:41; Nick Halagian (1) - 16:22; Jarid Lukosevicius (1) - pp - 19:53 |
| 8:43 - Jay Mackie (1) | | Third period | Stephen Hiff (1) - 9:56; Mitchell Hawes (1) - 12:39 |
| Michael Stiliadis (29 saves / 36 shots) | | Goalie stats | Brett Magnus (30 saves / 32 shots) |

| March 4 | Victoria Grizzlies | 2 – 1 | OT | Powell River Kings | The Q Centre |
| 16:24 - Ayden MacDonald (1) | | First period | | Jonny Evans (1) - 4:28 |
| No scoring | | Second period | | No scoring |
| No scoring | | Third period | | No scoring |
| 2:19 - Chris Harpur (1) | | First overtime period | | No scoring |
| Michael Stiliadis (24 saves / 25 shots) | | Goalie stats | | Brett Magnus (31 saves / 33 shots) |

| March 6 | Powell River Kings | 5 – 2 | Victoria Grizzlies | Hap Parker Arena |

| March 7 | Powell River Kings | 1 – 6 | Victoria Grizzlies | Hap Parker Arena |

| March 8 | Powell River Kings | 5 – 1 | Victoria Grizzlies | Hap Parker Arena |

| March 10 | Victoria Grizzlies | 4 – 5 | OT | Powell River Kings | The Q Centre |

| Powell River wins series 4 – 2 |

=== Island Division Final ===
==== (1) Nanaimo Clippers vs. (3) Powell River Kings ====
| March 13 | Nanaimo Clippers | 4 – 2 | Powell River Kings | Frank Crane Arena |
| 3:50 - pp - Nicholas Gushue (3) | | First period | Jacob Pritchard (6) - 8:43 |
| 2:02 - Nicholas Gushue (4) | | Second period | Mitchell Hawes (2) - 1:00 |
| 2:07 - pp - Brendan Taylor (2); 4:30 - Brendan Taylor (3) | | Third period | No scoring |
| Guillaume Decelles (41 saves / 43 shots) | | Goalie stats | Brett Magnus (41 saves / 45 shots) |

| March 14 | Nanaimo Clippers | 2 – 1 | Powell River Kings | Frank Crane Arena |

| March 16 | Powell River Kings | 2 – 1 | Nanaimo Clippers | Hap Parker Arena |

| March 17 | Powell River Kings | 2 – 1 | Nanaimo Clippers | Hap Parker Arena |

| March 19 | Nanaimo Clippers | 2 – 1 | Powell River Kings | Frank Crane Arena |

| March 20 | Powell River Kings | 4 – 2 | Nanaimo Clippers | Hap Parker Arena |

| March 22 | Nanaimo Clippers | 3 – 2 | Powell River Kings | Frank Crane Arena |

| Nanaimo wins series 4 – 3 |

Mainland Division Semi-finals
1 | Chilliwack | 4
4 | Coquitlam | 1
2 | Langley | 2
3 | Prince George | 4

Mainland Division Finals
1 | Chilliwack | 4
3 | Prince George | 0

=== Mainland Division Semifinal ===
==== (1) Chilliwack Chiefs vs. (4) Coquitlam Express ====
| March 3 | Chilliwack Chiefs | 4 – 1 | Coquitlam Express | Chilliwack Coliseum |
| 12:14 - Jordan Kawaguchi (1); 18:37 - Jake Hand (1) | | First period | No scoring |
| No scoring | | Second period | No scoring |
| 12:12 - pp - Kurt Black (1); 19:06 - en - Jake Hand (2) | | Third period | Daniel Fritz (1) - 18:03 |
| David Jacobson (39 saves / 40 shots) | | Goalie stats | Chris Tai (20 saves / 23 shots) |

| March 4 | Chilliwack Chiefs | 6 – 2 | Coquitlam Express | Chilliwack Coliseum |
| 2:53 - pp - Jake Hand (3) | | First period | Jackson Cressey (1) - pp - 8:00 |
| 5:56 - Tipper Higgins (1); 6:16 - Jordan Kawaguchi (2); 7:55 - Brandon Potomak (1) | | Second period | Corey Mackin (1) - 11:00 |
| 8:46 - Scott Davidson (1); 15:52 - pp - Craig Puffer (1) | | Third period | No scoring |
| David Jacobson (34 saves / 36 shots) | | Goalie stats | Chris Tai (35 saves / 41 shots) |

| March 6 | Coquitlam Express | 6 – 5 | OT | Chilliwack Chiefs | Poirier Sport & Leisure Complex |
| 6:37 - Brett Supinski (1); 9:19 - Michael Merulla (1) | | First period | | Rory Bell (1) - 0:33; Rory Bell (2) - 2:27 |
| 2:33 - pp - Brett Supinski (2); 16:29 - Corey Mackin (2) | | Second period | | Tipper Higgins (2) - 4:27 |
| 13:11 - Brendan Gulka (1) | | Third period | | Tipper Higgins (3) - pp - 7:05; Tipper Higgins (4) - 17:34 |
| 6:22 - Austin Anselmo (1) | | First overtime period | | No scoring |
| Chris Tai (37 saves / 42 shots) | | Goalie stats | | David Jacobson (9 saves / 12 shots); Aidan Pelino (27 saves / 32 shots) |

| March 7 | Coquitlam Express | 2 – 7 | Chilliwack Chiefs | Poirier Sport & Leisure Complex |

| March 9 | Chilliwack Chiefs | 4 – 2 | Coquitlam Express | Chilliwack Coliseum |

| Chilliwack wins series 4 – 1 |

==== (2) Langley Rivermen vs. (3) Prince George Spruce Kings ====
| March 3 | Langley Rivermen | 0 – 1 | Prince George Spruce Kings | Langley Events Centre |

| March 4 | Langley Rivermen | 4 – 2 | Prince George Spruce Kings | Langley Events Centre |

| March 6 | Prince George Spruce Kings | 4 – 2 | Langley Rivermen | Kopar Memorial Arena |

| March 7 | Prince George Spruce Kings | 1 – 4 | Langley Rivermen | Kopar Memorial Arena |

| March 9 | Langley Rivermen | 4 – 5 | OT | Prince George Spruce Kings | Langley Events Centre |

| March 10 | Prince George Spruce Kings | 3 – 2 | Langley Rivermen | Kopar Memorial Arena |

| Prince George wins series 4 – 2 |

=== Mainland Division Final ===
==== (1) Chilliwack Chiefs vs. (3) Prince George Spruce Kings ====
| March 13 | Chilliwack Chiefs | 3 – 2 | Prince George Spruce Kings | Chilliwack Coliseum |
| 10:08 - Eric Roberts (1); 11:28 - Tipper Higgins (7) | | First period | No scoring |
| 16:14 - sh - Jake Hand (5) | | Second period | No scoring |
| No scoring | | Third period | Michael Buonincontri (5) - 12:03; Brogan O'Brien (3) - 19:41 |
| David Jacobson (30 saves / 32 shots) | | Goalie stats | Jesse Jenks (33 saves / 36 shots) |

| March 14 | Chilliwack Chiefs | 8 – 1 | Prince George Spruce Kings | Chilliwack Coliseum |
| 10:18 - Mason Boh (2); 15:40 - Mark Esposito (1); 17:44 - pp - Tipper Higgins (8) | | First period | Braiden Epp (2) - pp - 19:00 |
| 1:53 - Tipper Higgins (9); 6:06 - Craig Puffer (4); 6:49 - Jake Larson (1); 19:10 - pp - Vincent Desharnais (1) | | Second period | No scoring |
| 5:14 - pp - Craig Puffer (5) | | Third period | No scoring |
| David Jacobson (14 saves / 15 shots); Aidan Pelino (9 saves / 9 shots) | | Goalie stats | Jesse Jenks (6 saves / 9 shots); Alex Brooks-Potts (13 saves / 18 shots) |

| March 16 | Prince George Spruce Kings | 3 – 4 | Chilliwack Chiefs | Kopar Memorial Arena |

| March 17 | Prince George Spruce Kings | 3 – 4 | Chilliwack Chiefs | Kopar Memorial Arena |

| Chilliwack wins series 4 – 0 |

=== Semi-final Round Robin ===
| Rank | Team | W-L | GF | GA | +/- | Points |
|---|---|---|---|---|---|---|
| 1 | Penticton | 3-1 | 13 | 8 | +5 | 6 |
| 2 | Nanaimo | 2-1 | 10 | 7 | +3 | 4 |
| 3 | Chilliwack | 0-3 | 8 | 16 | -8 | 0 |

*Chilliwack was mathematically eliminated after the fifth game of the round robin. Therefore, the sixth game was not played.

=== Fred Page Cup Final ===
| Final |
| 1 | Penticton | 4 |
| 2 | Nanaimo | 2 |

==== (1) Penticton Vees vs. (2) Nanaimo Clippers ====
| April 10 | Penticton Vees | 2 – 5 | Nanaimo Clippers | South Okanagan Events Centre |
| 5:03 - Demico Hannoun (6) | | First period | Anthony Rinaldi (3) - 13:26 |
| 19:14 - pp - Jack Ramsey (3) | | Second period | Yanni Kaldis (4) - 5:08; Anthony Rinaldi (4) - 12:13; Sheldon Rempal (4) - 15:39 |
| No scoring | | Third period | No scoring |
| Hunter Miska (15 saves / 20 shots); Brendan Barry (4 saves / 4 shots) | | Goalie stats | Guillaume Decelles (36 saves / 38 shots) |

| April 11 | Penticton Vees | 1 – 2 | OT | Nanaimo Clippers | South Okanagan Events Centre |
| 13:05 - pp - Cody DePourcq (2) | | First period | | Sheldon Rempal (5) - 18:43 |
| No scoring | | Second period | | No scoring |
| No scoring | | Third period | | No scoring |
| No scoring | | First overtime period | | Brett Roulston (6) - 0:20 |
| Hunter Miska (21 saves / 23 shots) | | Goalie stats | | Guillaume Decelles (37 saves / 38 shots) |

| April 13 | Nanaimo Clippers | 1 – 2 | OT | Penticton Vees | Frank Crane Arena |
| 8:00 - Nicolas Carrier (5) | | First period | | No scoring |
| No scoring | | Second period | | Steen Cooper (4) - pp - 16:46 |
| No scoring | | Third period | | No scoring |
| No scoring | | First overtime period | | Tyson Jost (8) - 0:57 |
| Guillaume Decelles (37 saves / 39 shots) | | Goalie stats | | Hunter Miska (26 saves / 27 shots) |

| April 14 | Nanaimo Clippers | 5 – 8 | Penticton Vees | Frank Crane Arena |
| 8:00 - Devin Brosseau (2); 11:00 - pp - Sheldon Rempal (6) | | First period | Steen Cooper (5) - 1:52 |
| 17:00 - Spencer Hewson (5) | | Second period | Gabe Bast (2) - 3:20; Mike Lee (1) - pp - 6:33; Demico Hannoun (7) - pp - 12:58; Steen Cooper (6) - pp - 13:39 |
| Sheldon Rempal (7) - 11:00; Brendan Taylor (4) - 17:00 | | Third period | Tyson Jost (9) - 1:25; Tyson Jost (10) - en - 19:26 |
| Guillaume Decelles (32 saves / 39 shots) | | Goalie stats | Hunter Miska (33 saves / 38 shots) |

| April 16 | Penticton Vees | 3 – 2 | Nanaimo Clippers | South Okanagan Events Centre |
| No scoring | | First period | No scoring |
| 14:56 - Demico Hannoun (8) | | Second period | Corey Renwick (3) - sh - 8:39; Ryan Forbes (3) - 16:46 |
| 11:44 - Cam Amantea (5); 15:32 - Riley Alferd (5) | | Third period | No scoring |
| Hunter Miska (24 saves / 26 shots) | | Goalie stats | Guillaume Decelles (34 saves / 37 shots) |

| April 17 | Nanaimo Clippers | 2 – 3 | OT | Penticton Vees | Frank Crane Arena |
| No scoring | | First period | | No scoring |
| No scoring | | Second period | | No scoring |
| 9:32 - Spencer Hewson (6); 16:38 - Brett Roulston (7) | | Third period | | Dante Fabbro (4) - 9:18; Riley Alferd (6) - 11:47 |
| No scoring | | First overtime period | | Dakota Conroy (6) - 2:06 |
| Guillaume Decelles (39 saves / 42 shots) | | Goalie stats | | Hunter Miska (27 saves / 29 shots) |

| Penticton wins series 4 – 2 |

Playoff results are listed on the official league website.

=== 2015 Western Canada Cup ===
The Fred Page Cup Champion will advance to the 2015 Western Canada Cup in Fort McMurray, Alberta where they will play for one of two spots in the 2015 Royal Bank Cup.

== Playoff scoring leaders ==
GP = Games Played, G = Goals, A = Assists, P = Points, PIM = Penalties In Minutes

| Player | Team | GP | G | A | Pts | PIM |
|---|---|---|---|---|---|---|
| Jake Hand | Chilliwack Chiefs | 12 | 9 | 13 | 22 | 14 |
| Demico Hannoun | Penticton Vees | 22 | 8 | 13 | 21 | 32 |
| Connor Chartier | Penticton Vees | 22 | 9 | 10 | 19 | 2 |
| Dakota Conroy | Penticton Vees | 22 | 6 | 12 | 18 | 10 |
| Brett Roulston | Nanaimo Clippers | 23 | 7 | 10 | 17 | 26 |
| Nicholas Gushue | Nanaimo Clippers | 23 | 5 | 12 | 17 | 14 |
| Tipper Higgins | Chilliwack Chiefs | 12 | 11 | 5 | 16 | 4 |
| Jacob Pritchard | Powell River Kings | 13 | 8 | 7 | 15 | 10 |
| Craig Puffer | Chilliwack Chiefs | 12 | 7 | 8 | 15 | 6 |
| Jordan Kawaguchi | Chilliwack Chiefs | 12 | 5 | 10 | 15 | 8 |

== Playoff leading goaltenders ==
Note: GP = Games Played, Mins = Minutes Played, W = Wins, L = Losses, T = Ties, GA = Goals Against, SO = Shutouts, Sv% = Save Percentage, GAA = Goals Against Average. Regulation losses and overtime losses have been combined for total losses.

| Player | Team | GP | Mins | W | L | OTL | GA | SO | Sv% | GAA |
|---|---|---|---|---|---|---|---|---|---|---|
| Danny Todosychuk | Vernon Vipers | 6 | 381 | 3 | 2 | 0 | 14 | 0 | 0.930 | 2.20 |
| Hunter Miska | Penticton Vees | 21 | 1365 | 15 | 4 | 2 | 52 | 2 | 0.923 | 2.29 |
| Guillaume Decelles | Nanaimo Clippers | 23 | 1394 | 12 | 8 | 3 | 55 | 1 | 0.932 | 2.37 |
| Brett Magnus | Powell River Kings | 13 | 806 | 7 | 5 | 1 | 32 | 0 | 0.930 | 2.38 |
| Bo Didur | Langley Rivermen | 6 | 364 | 2 | 3 | 1 | 15 | 0 | 0.893 | 2.47 |

== Award winners ==
- Brett Hull Trophy (Top Scorer): Corey Mackin (Coquitlam Express)
- Best Defenceman: Andrew Farny (Salmon Arm Silverbacks)
- Bruce Allison Memorial Trophy (Rookie of the Year): Brett Supinski (Coquitlam Express)
- Bob Fenton Trophy (Most Sportsmanlike): John Schiavo (Merritt Centennials)
- Top Goaltender: Hunter Miska (Penticton Vees)
- Wally Forslund Memorial Trophy (Best Goaltending Duo): Hunter Miska & Brendan Barry (Penticton Vees)
- Vern Dye Memorial Trophy (regular-season MVP): Corey Mackin (Coquitlam Express)
- Joe Tennant Memorial Trophy (Coach of the Year): Jason Tatarnic (Chilliwack Chiefs)
- Ron Boileau Memorial Trophy (Best Regular Season Record): Penticton Vees
- Fred Page Cup (League Champions): Penticton Vees

== Players Selected in 2015 NHL entry draft ==
Rd7: 190 Marcus Vela San Jose Sharks (Langley Rivermen)

== See also ==
- 2015 Royal Bank Cup
- 2014 in ice hockey
- 2015 in ice hockey
