= Hunter Miska =

American ice hockey player

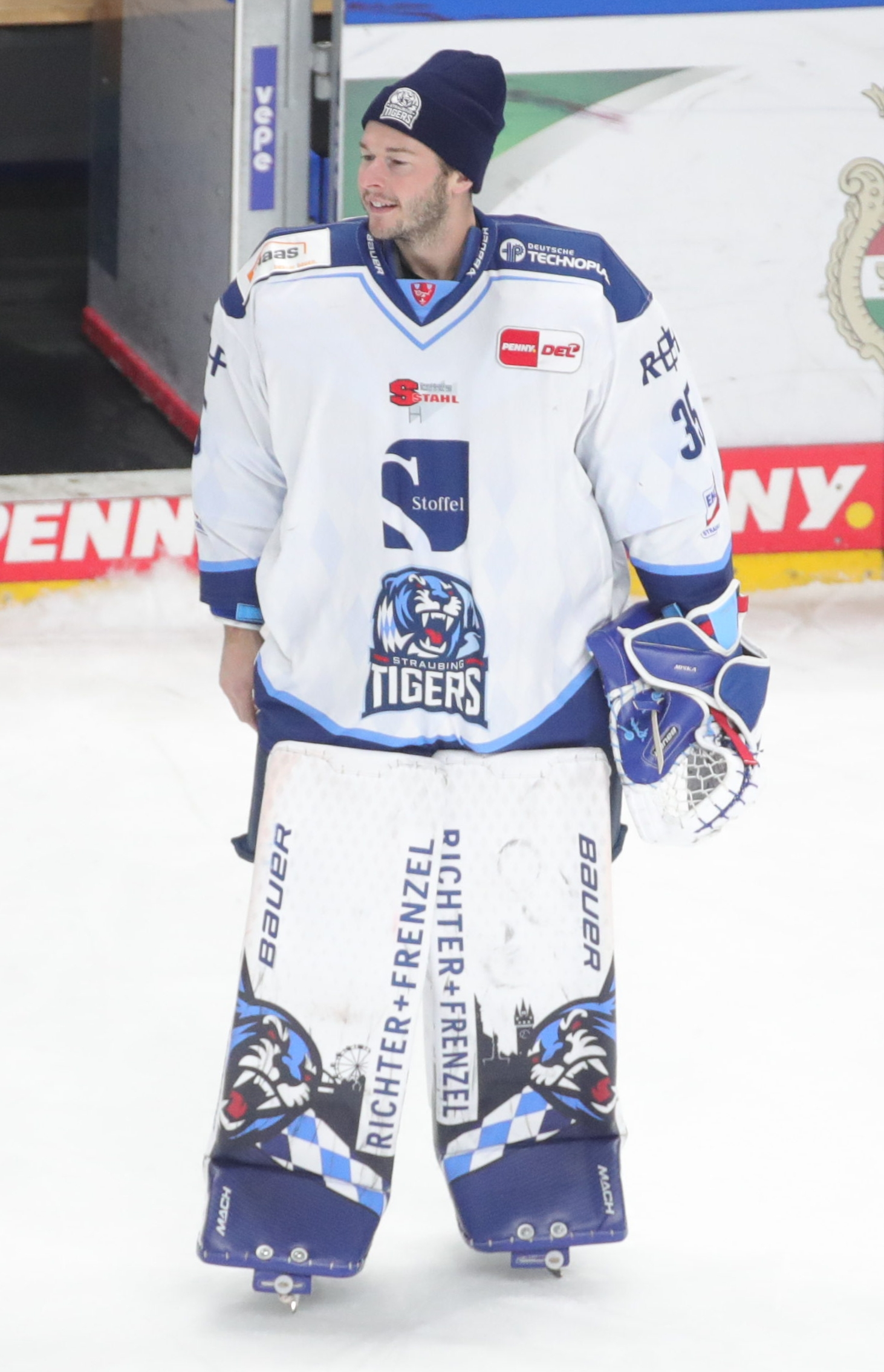
- Miska with the Straubing Tigers in 2022
- Born: July 7, 1995 (age 31) Stacy, Minnesota, U.S.
- Height: 6 ft 1 in (185 cm)
- Weight: 174 lb (79 kg; 12 st 6 lb)
- Position: Goaltender
- Catches: Left
- AHL team (P) Cur. team Former teams: Colorado Eagles; New Mexico Goatheads (ECHL); Arizona Coyotes; Colorado Avalanche; Straubing Tigers; Dynamo Moscow
- NHL draft: Undrafted
- Playing career: 2017–present

Hunter Miska (born July 7, 1995) is an American professional ice hockey goaltender for the New Mexico Goatheads in the ECHL while under contract to the Colorado Eagles of the American Hockey League (AHL). He has formerly played in the National Hockey League (NHL) with the Arizona Coyotes and Colorado Avalanche.

== Playing career ==
=== Amateur ===
Undrafted, Miska played junior hockey in the United States Hockey League and British Columbia Hockey League before embarking on collegiate hockey at the University of Minnesota at Duluth in the National Collegiate Hockey Conference.

In his freshman year with the Bulldogs in the 2016–17 season, Miska posted a 27–5–5 record with a .920 save percentage and a 2.20 goals against average with five shutouts. He helped lead the Bulldogs to the Frozen Four Championship game before falling 3–2 to the University of Denver. Miska was named as a finalist for the Mike Richter award, given annually to the goaltender voted to be the most outstanding in Division I NCAA hockey during the regular season.

=== Professional ===
Following an impressive debut season, Miska left Duluth to turn professional in signing a two-year, entry-level contract with the Arizona Coyotes on April 15, 2017. After attending his first training camp with the Coyotes, Miska was assigned to AHL affiliate, the Tucson Roadrunners, for the duration of the 2017–18 season.

In the 2018–19 season, Miska began the season continuing his tenure in the AHL with the Roadrunners. On November 6, 2018, Miska received his first recall to the NHL by the Coyotes, providing cover for the injured Antti Raanta. He made his NHL debut with the Coyotes in relief of Darcy Kuemper in a game against the Detroit Red Wings on November 13, 2018. On November 23, Miska was returned to the Roadrunners. Miska was used as an emergency recall for the Coyotes; however, he was shortly returned again to the AHL on November 30, 2018. Remaining with Tucson for the remainder of the season, Miska split duties between the pipes with Adin Hill, collecting just 10 wins in 25 games.

Having concluded his entry-level contract and as an impending restricted free agent, Miska was not tendered a qualifying offer to remain with the Coyotes, and was released to be a free agent on June 25, 2019. On July 12, 2019, Miska agreed to a one-year AHL contract with the Colorado Eagles, affiliate to the Colorado Avalanche. He began the 2019–20 season with the Eagles, before he was briefly assigned to ECHL affiliate, the Utah Grizzlies for 3 games. Upon his return to the AHL, with injury to fellow goaltender Antoine Bibeau, Miska remained with the Eagles posting 11 wins and tied fourth among all AHL goaltenders in save percentage through 19 games, before signing a one-year NHL contract for the remainder of the season with the Avalanche on February 10, 2020.

Having recorded his best season statistics in the AHL in his first year with the Eagles, Miska was re-signed by the Avalanche to a two-year, two-way contract extension on October 20, 2020. With an injury to fellow Avalanche goaltender Pavel Francouz, Miska remained on the opening night roster for the pandemic shortened 2020–21 season. Serving as the backup, on January 21, 2021, Miska made his first career NHL start; he made 23 saves in a 4–2 loss to the Los Angeles Kings. On February 26, Miska recorded his first career NHL win in a 3–2 victory over the Coyotes. Unable to solidify his role through 5 appearances, Miska was returned to the AHL after he was relieved from the net in a 8–4 victory over the Anaheim Ducks on March 16, 2021.

In the final season of his contract with the Avalanche in 2021–22, Miska was unable to replicate his earlier success with the Eagles, however collected 10 wins through 17 games and featured in 2 regular season contests with the Utah Grizzlies of the ECHL.

As a free agent after three seasons within the Avalanche organization, Miska agreed to sign his first European contract by committing to a one-year deal with German club, Straubing Tigers of the Deutsche Eishockey Liga (DEL), on July 9, 2022.

After two successful seasons with Straubing, Miska left the DEL as a free agent and secured a one-year contract with prominent Russian club, HC Dynamo Moscow of the Kontinental Hockey League (KHL), on July 23, 2024. In the 2024–25 season, Miska made 14 appearances with Dynamo and secured 5 wins before leaving the club through the mid-point of the season. In returning to North America as a free agent, Miska was signed to an AHL for the remainder of the season with the Bridgeport Islanders, the primary affiliate to the New York Islanders, on January 12, 2025.

Miska remained a free agent into the 2025–26 season, belatedly returning to the professional ranks in re-joining ECHL club, Utah Grizzlies, on February 18, 2026. In stabilising the Grizzlies crease, Miska posted 7 wins through 16 appearances, before ending the season on the roster of AHL affiliate, the Colorado Eagles, on a PTO.

Miska was signed to a one-year AHL contract to remain within the Eagles organization for the 2026–27 season on August 24, 2026.

== Personal life ==
Miska is a cousin of professional soccer player Khyah Harper.

== Career statistics ==
=== Regular season and playoffs ===
			Regular season									Playoffs
Season	Team	League	GP	W	L	OT	MIN	GA	SO	GAA	SV%	GP	W	L	MIN	GA	SO	GAA	SV%
2009–10	North Branch High	USHS	22	—	—	—	—	—	—	3.85	.886	2	—	—	—	—	—	8.50	.866
2010–11	North Branch High	USHS	25	—	—	—	—	—	—	4.50	.895	1	—	—	—	—	—	7.00	.889
2011–12	U.S. National Development Team	USHL	25	10	13	0	1,305	78	0	3.59	.854	2	0	2	119	12	0	6.06	.824
2012–13	U.S. National Development Team	USHL	13	3	7	2	745	38	0	3.06	.881	—	—	—	—	—	—	—	—
2013–14	Penticton Vees	BCHL	34	19	12	2	1,988	74	2	2.23	.916	6	3	2	284	16	0	3.38	.866
2014–15	Penticton Vees	BCHL	46	34	9	3	2,775	87	5	1.88	.931	21	15	6	1,365	52	2	2.29	.923
2015–16	Dubuque Fighting Saints	USHL	46	32	13	1	2,761	113	1	2.46	.913	12	6	5	750	28	1	2.24	.921
2016–17	U. of Minnesota-Duluth	NCHC	39	27	5	5	2,321	85	5	2.20	.920	—	—	—	—	—	—	—	—
2017–18	Tucson Roadrunners	AHL	36	22	9	0	1,941	85	1	2.63	.901	—	—	—	—	—	—	—	—
2018–19	Tucson Roadrunners	AHL	25	10	8	4	1,307	67	0	3.08	.895	—	—	—	—	—	—	—	—
2018–19	Arizona Coyotes	NHL	1	0	0	0	19	1	0	3.33	.889	—	—	—	—	—	—	—	—
2019–20	Utah Grizzlies	ECHL	3	2	1	0	186	5	0	1.62	.947	—	—	—	—	—	—	—	—
2019–20	Colorado Eagles	AHL	26	16	6	3	1,522	63	2	2.48	.924	—	—	—	—	—	—	—	—
2020–21	Colorado Avalanche	NHL	5	1	1	2	260	18	0	4.16	.838	—	—	—	—	—	—	—	—
2020–21	Colorado Eagles	AHL	9	5	4	0	537	26	0	2.91	.909	—	—	—	—	—	—	—	—
2021–22	Colorado Eagles	AHL	17	10	5	0	829	42	1	3.04	.889	—	—	—	—	—	—	—	—
2021–22	Utah Grizzlies	ECHL	2	1	1	0	120	7	0	3.51	.875	—	—	—	—	—	—	—	—
2022–23	Straubing Tigers	DEL	31	16	14	0	1793	87	0	2.91	.893	7	3	4	415	15	1	2.17	.915
2023–24	Straubing Tigers	DEL	29	17	12	0	1707	70	2	2.46	.909	8	4	4	460	17	0	2.22	.907
2024–25	Dynamo Moscow	KHL	14	5	5	3	813	38	1	2.81	.908	—	—	—	—	—	—	—	—
2024–25	Bridgeport Islanders	AHL	12	2	8	0	560	40	0	4.28	.861	—	—	—	—	—	—	—	—
2025–26	Utah Grizzlies	ECHL	16	7	5	3	927	46	1	2.98	.902	—	—	—	—	—	—	—	—
NHL totals			6	1	1	2	279	19	0	4.10	.842	—	—	—	—	—	—	—	—

=== International ===
Year	Team	Event	Result	GP	W	L	OT	MIN	GA	SO	GAA	SV%
2012	United States	U17	2nd place, silver medalist(s)	4	—	—	—	—	—	—	2.41	.879
Junior totals				4	—	—	—	—	—	—	2.41	.879

== Awards and honors ==
Award	Year
BCHL
Best goalie duo with lowest GAA	2014, 2015
Second All-Star Team	2014
Best SVS % (.931)	2015
Best GAA (1.88)	2015
First All-Star Team	2015
Top Goaltender	2015
College
NCHC All-Tournament Team	2017
NCHC Second All-Star Team	2017
