= Kopar Memorial Arena =

Indoor arena in Prince George, British Columbia

Coordinates: 53.9123°N 122.7471°W

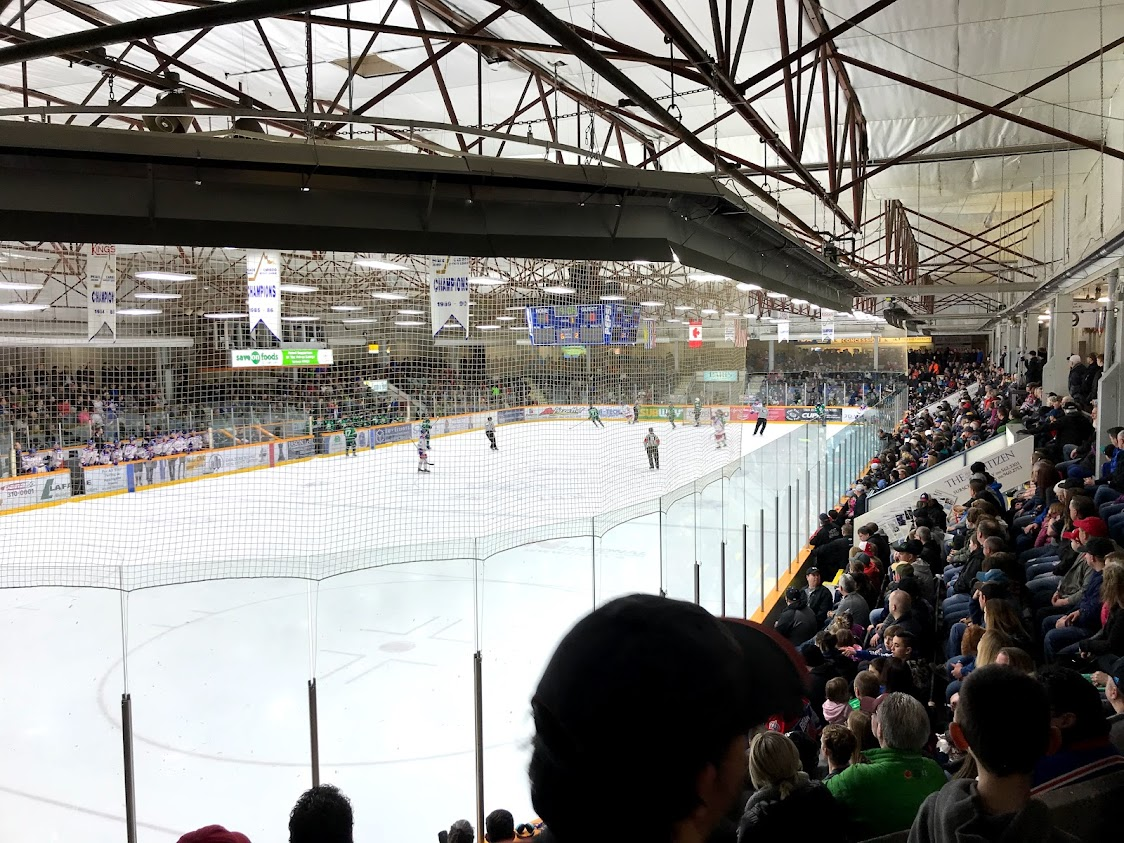
- Interactive map of Kopar Memorial Arena
- Former names: Prince George Coliseum (1958–2016, 2022); Rolling Mix Concrete Arena (2016–2022)
- Address: 888 Dominion St; Prince George, BC V2L 1T2; Canada
- Location: Prince George, British Columbia, Canada
- Operator: City of Prince George
- Capacity: 2,112 (bench & standing)

Construction
- Opened: 1958

Tenants
- Prince George Spruce Kings (BCHL); Prince George Cougars (WHL) (1994–95)

Kopar Memorial Arena is an indoor arena located in Prince George, British Columbia, that was built in 1958. Originally called the Prince George Coliseum, it is located next to the Prince George Civic Centre on Dominion Street. It seats 2,112 (including standing room) and is home to the Prince George Spruce Kings of the British Columbia Hockey League. It was also used briefly by the Prince George Cougars of the Western Hockey League while the CN Centre was under construction.

== Naming Rights ==
The arena had a brief naming agreement with Rolling Mix Concreate from 2016 to 2022. The naming contract ended on December 31, 2020, but the City of Prince George said the pandemic pushed back any major changes. The name was changed back to the Prince George Coliseum following the second round exit of the British Columbia Hockey League playoffs by the Prince George Spruce Kings.

At the start of the 2022-2023 BCHL season, it was announced that the naming rights of the area were awarded to Kopar Administration Ltd. Kopar Memorial Arena will be the name of the arena for four seasons.
