= Dante Fabbro =

Canadian ice hockey player (born 1998)

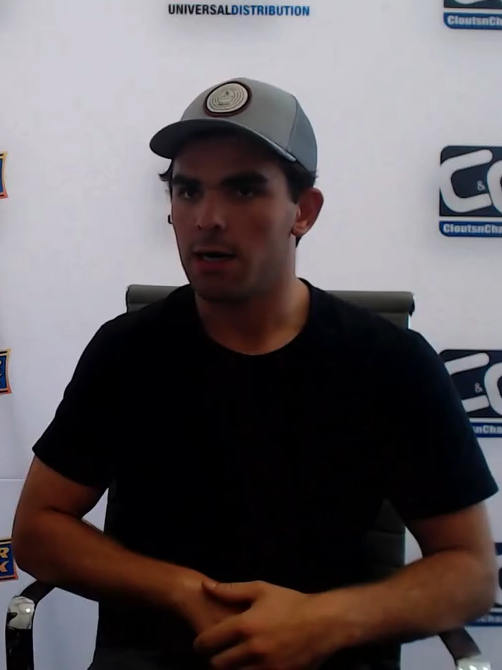
- Born: June 20, 1998 (age 28) Coquitlam, British Columbia, Canada
- Height: 6 ft 0 in (183 cm)
- Weight: 200 lb (91 kg; 14 st 4 lb)
- Position: Defence
- Shoots: Right
- NHL team Former teams: Columbus Blue Jackets; Nashville Predators
- National team: Canada
- NHL draft: 17th overall, 2016; Nashville Predators
- Playing career: 2019–present

Dante Fabbro (born June 20, 1998) is a Canadian professional ice hockey player who is a defenceman for the Columbus Blue Jackets of the National Hockey League (NHL). He was selected in the first round, 17th overall, in the 2016 NHL entry draft by the Nashville Predators.

== Playing career ==
Fabbro was originally drafted by the Seattle Thunderbirds in the first round (8th overall) of the 2013 WHL Bantam Draft, but decided to play with the Penticton Vees of the BCHL to retain his NCAA eligibility. During the 2015–16 BCHL season, Fabbro was named an alternate captain and ended the season being named the best defenceman in the league. He committed to play for Boston University for the 2016–17 season before being drafted 17th overall in the 2016 NHL entry draft. During his sophomore season, Fabbro was selected for the Hockey East Second All-Star Team after coming in second among Hockey East defencemen in points.

On March 27, 2019, Fabbro signed a three-year, entry-level contract with the Nashville Predators. He made his NHL debut a few days later on March 30, in a 5–2 loss to the Columbus Blue Jackets and recorded his first career NHL goal on April 9.

On March 8, 2024, Fabbro signed a one-year contract extension with the Predators. In the 2024–25 season, Fabbro was reduced to a depth role on the blueline, going scoreless through 6 appearances. On November 10, 2024, Fabbro's seven year tenure with the Predators ended after he was claimed off waivers by the Columbus Blue Jackets.

On June 29, 2025 he signed a four-year, $16.5 million extension with the Blue Jackets.

== International play ==
Medal record

Men's ice hockey

Representing Canada

World Championships
Silver medal – second place	2019 Slovakia	

World Junior Championships
Gold medal – first place	2018 United States	
Silver medal – second place	2017 Canada	

Fabbro made his first World Juniors appearance when he was selected to represent Canada junior team at the 2017 World Junior Championships. The following year, Fabbro was selected as an alternate captain for Canada at the 2018 World Junior Championships, where he helped guide them to a gold medal.

On April 29, 2019, following his first playoff experience with the Predators, Fabbro was named to the Canada senior team for the 2019 World Championship. He helped Canada progress through to the playoff rounds before losing the final to Finland to finish with the silver medal on May 26, 2019. He finished the tournament posting one goal and two assists in nine games.

== Personal life ==
Fabbro is the youngest of three children born to Tina and Steve Fabbro.

== Career statistics ==
=== Regular season and playoffs ===
			Regular season					Playoffs
Season	Team	League	GP	G	A	Pts	PIM	GP	G	A	Pts	PIM
2013–14	Langley Rivermen	BCHL	2	0	0	0	0	—	—	—	—	—
2014–15	Penticton Vees	BCHL	44	4	29	33	16	21	4	11	15	10
2015–16	Penticton Vees	BCHL	45	14	53	67	30	11	0	8	8	2
2016–17	Boston University	HE	36	6	12	18	16	—	—	—	—	—
2017–18	Boston University	HE	38	9	20	29	22	—	—	—	—	—
2018–19	Boston University	HE	38	7	26	33	39	—	—	—	—	—
2018–19	Nashville Predators	NHL	4	1	0	1	0	6	0	1	1	0
2019–20	Nashville Predators	NHL	64	5	6	11	38	4	0	0	0	2
2020–21	Nashville Predators	NHL	40	2	10	12	23	—	—	—	—	—
2021–22	Nashville Predators	NHL	66	3	21	24	24	4	0	0	0	4
2022–23	Nashville Predators	NHL	79	2	9	11	50	—	—	—	—	—
2023–24	Nashville Predators	NHL	56	3	10	13	24	3	0	0	0	0
2024–25	Nashville Predators	NHL	6	0	0	0	0	—	—	—	—	—
2024–25	Columbus Blue Jackets	NHL	62	9	17	26	40	—	—	—	—	—
2025–26	Columbus Blue Jackets	NHL	74	5	6	11	33	—	—	—	—	—
NHL totals			451	30	79	109	232	17	0	1	1	6

=== International ===
Year	Team	Event	Result	GP	G	A	Pts	PIM
2014	Canada Red	U17	6th	5	2	1	3	0
2015	Canada	IH18	1st place, gold medalist(s)	4	0	0	0	0
2016	Canada	U18	4th	7	0	8	8	16
2017	Canada	WJC	2nd place, silver medalist(s)	7	0	1	1	0
2018	Canada	WJC	1st place, gold medalist(s)	7	0	0	0	0
2019	Canada	WC	2nd place, silver medalist(s)	9	1	2	3	0
Junior totals				30	2	10	12	16
Senior totals				9	1	2	3	0

== Awards and honours ==
Award	Year	Ref
BCHL
All-Rookie Team	2015	
RBC Cup Top Defenceman	2015	
First All-Star Team	2016	
Top Defenceman	2016	
CJHL Western All-Star Team	2016	
CJHL Top Defenceman	2016	
College
HE Second All-Star Team	2018, 2019	
New England D1 All-Stars	2018	

Awards and achievements
Preceded by Kevin Fiala	Nashville Predators first-round draft pick 2016	Succeeded by Eeli Tolvanen
