= Kal Tire Place =

Multi-use arena in Vernon, British Columbia

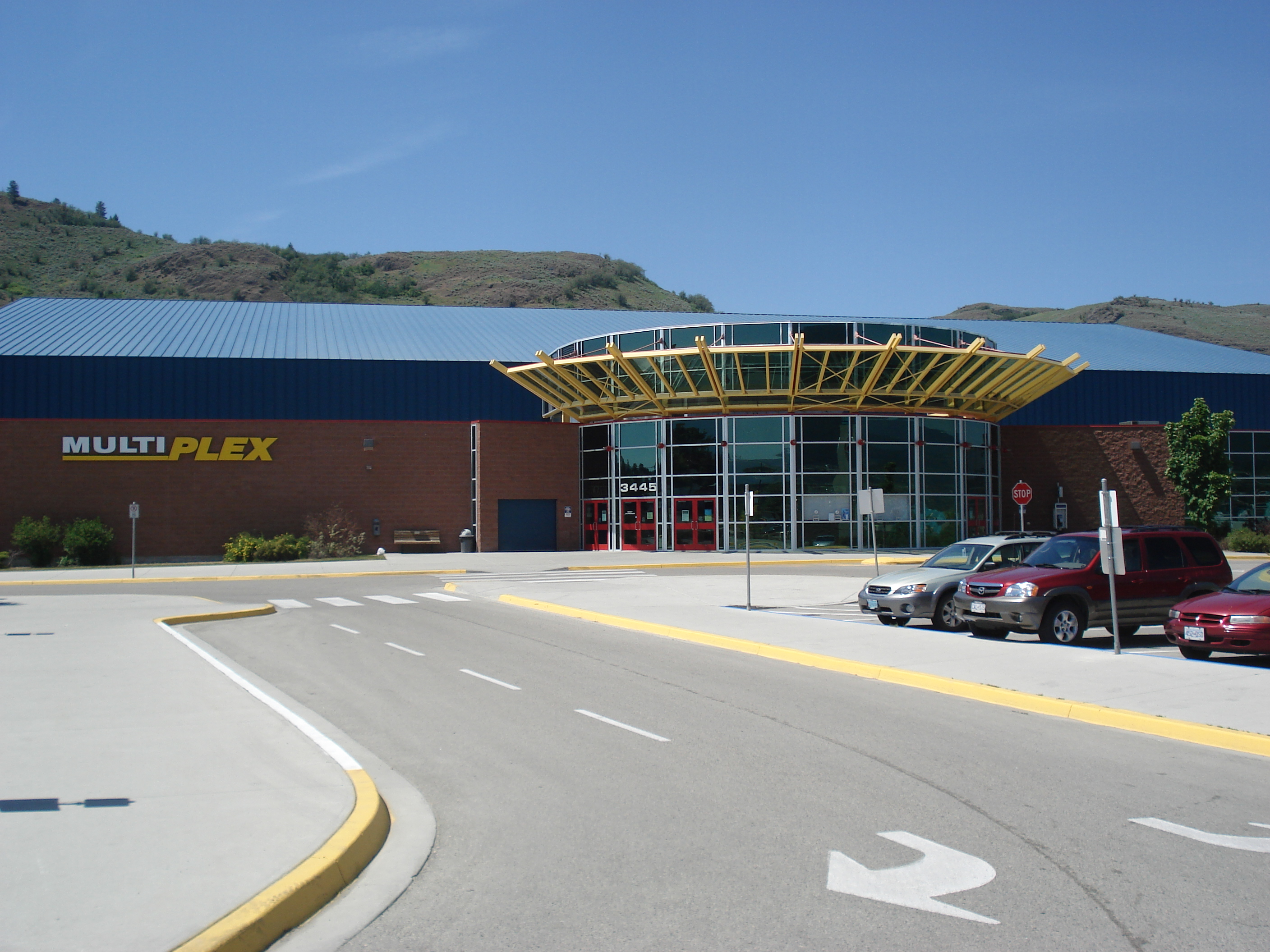
- Interactive map of Kal Tire Place
- Former names: Vernon Multiplex (2001–2008); Wesbild Centre (2008–2013)
- Location: 3445 43rd Avenue; Vernon, British Columbia; V1T 8P5
- Coordinates: 50°16′32″N 119°16′41″W
- Owner: Regional District of North Okanagan
- Operator: City of Vernon
- Capacity: Concerts: 5,650; Ice hockey: 3,006

Construction
- Opened: October 12, 2001
- Expanded: 2018
- Cost: C$15 million

Tenant
- Vernon Vipers (BCHL) (2001–present)

Kal Tire Place, formerly known as Wesbild Centre and Vernon Multiplex, is a 3,006 seat multi-purpose arena located in Vernon, British Columbia, Canada. There is an additional standing room capacity of 500. It was built in 2001 as an upgrade over the aging Civic Arena and became the home ice surface of the Vernon Vipers.

The Wesbild Centre was the location of the 2008 Ford World Women's Curling Championship.

On March 7, 2008, Wesbild Holdings Limited, a real-estate developing company, acquired the naming rights to the facility. The five–year, $200,000 pact, which included an additional five-year, $250,000 option, began with a public skating event in April 2008. The arena was renamed to Kal Tire Place in June 2013 after Vernon-based Kal Tire purchased the arena's naming rights for $40,000 annually over four years.
