= 2013–14 BCHL season =

2013-14 BCHL Season
- League: British Columbia Hockey League
- Sport: Hockey
- Duration: Regular season 2013-09-06 - 2014-03-01; Playoffs; 2014-03-04 - 2014-04-15
- Teams: 16
- Finals champions: Coquitlam Express

BCHL seasons
- 2012–13 BCHL 2014–15 BCHL

The 2013–14 BCHL season was the 52nd season of the British Columbia Hockey League. (BCHL) The sixteen teams from the Interior, Island and Mainland divisions played 58 game schedules, starting with the 2013 BCHL Showcase in Chilliwack, BC.

The top teams from each division played for the Fred Page Cup, the BCHL Championship, which was won by the Coquitlam Express for the second time in club history. They would go on to finish fourth at the Western Canadian Junior A championship, the Western Canada Cup, in Dauphin, Manitoba, failing to qualify for the Royal Bank Cup in Vernon, BC.

== Changes ==
Map of BCHL, 2012–13 to 2014–15
Island Division
Mainland Division
Interior Division
- The Coastal and Interior Conferences have been abolished. The former Interior Conference is now the Interior Division.
- Two games have been added to the schedule, increasing the regular season from 56 to 58 games.
- The third round of the Fred Page Cup Playoffs will now be a round robin between the three division champions.
- Player awards will now only be given to one player, instead of one player from each conference.

== Final standings ==
Note: GP = Games Played, W = Wins, L = Losses, T = Ties, OTL = Overtime Losses, Pts = Points

Interior Division
Team	Centre	W–L–T-OTL	Points
Penticton Vees	Penticton, BC	36-16-2-4	78
West Kelowna Warriors	West Kelowna, BC	29-19-3-4	78
Vernon Vipers	Vernon, BC	30-18-4-6	70
Merritt Centennials	Merritt, BC	31-22-4-1	67
Salmon Arm Silverbacks	Salmon Arm, BC	25-24-1-8	59
Trail Smoke Eaters	Trail, BC	10-42-2-4	26
Island Division
Team	Centre	W–L–T-OTL	Points
Victoria Grizzlies	Victoria, BC	37-15-3-3	80
Powell River Kings	Powell River, BC	36-16-2-4	78
Nanaimo Clippers	Nanaimo, BC	27-28-1-2	57
Alberni Valley Bulldogs	Port Alberni, BC	21-28-2-7	51
Cowichan Valley Capitals	Duncan, BC	22-30-2-4	50
Mainland Division
Team	Centre	W–L–T-OTL	Points
Langley Rivermen	Langley Township, BC	37-13-3-5	82
Prince George Spruce Kings	Prince George, BC, BC	32-20-4-2	70
Coquitlam Express	Coquitlam, BC	27-26-2-3	59
Surrey Eagles	White Rock, BC	25-30-1-2	53
Chilliwack Chiefs	Chilliwack, BC	14-37-2-5	35

- Teams are listed on the official league website.
- Standings listed by eSportsDeskPro on the official league website.

== 2013–2014 BCHL Fred Page Cup Playoffs ==
=== Division Playoffs ===
Interior Division Semi-final
1	Penticton	4
4	Merritt	0
2	West Kelowna	2
3	Vernon	4

Interior Division Final
1	Penticton	3
3	Vernon	4

Island Division Semi-final
1	Victoria	4
4	Alberni Valley	3
2	Powell River	4
3	Nanaimo	1

Island Division Final
1	Victoria	4
2	Powell River	2

Mainland Division Semi-finals
1	Langley	4
4	Surrey	2
2	Prince George	2
3	Coquitlam	4

Mainland Division Finals
1	Langley	2
3	Coquitlam	4

=== Semi-final Round Robin ===
Rank	Team	W-L	GF	GA	+/-	Points
1	Vernon	2-0	11	5	+6	4
2	Coquitlam	2-1	11	12	-1	4
3	Victoria	0-3	10	15	-5	0

Semifinal Games
#	Date	Visitor	Score	Home	OT	Arena
1	March 28	Vernon	5-4	Victoria		The Q Center
2	March 30	Coquitlam	1-6	Vernon		Kal Tire Place
3	April 1	Victoria	3-6	Coquitlam		Poirier Sport and Leisure Complex
4	April 3	Coquitlam	4-3	Victoria	3OT	The Q Center
5	April 5	Victoria	NP	Vernon		Kal Tire Place
6	April 7	Vernon	NP	Coquitlam		Poirier Sport and Leisure Complex

NP = Not Played. Victoria was eliminated after the fourth game of the semifinal, meaning the last two games did not need to be played.

=== Fred Page Cup Final ===
Final
1	Vernon	0
2	Coquitlam	4

Fred Page Cup Final
#	Date	Visitor	Score	Home	OT	Arena
1	April 11	Coquitlam	6–4	Vernon		Kal Tire Place
2	April 12	Coquitlam	4–3	Vernon	OT	Kal Tire Place
3	April 14	Vernon	2–3	Coquitlam	OT	Poirier Sport and Leisure Complex
4	April 15	Vernon	3–4	Coquitlam		Poirier Sport and Leisure Complex

*If necessary

Playoff results are listed on the official league website.

=== 2014 Western Canada Cup ===
In the round robin, Coquitlam would defeat the AJHL champion Spruce Grove Saints and MJHL champion Winnipeg Blues before losing to the SJHL champion Yorkton Terriers and host Dauphin Kings. This placed them in the semifinal round against Spruce Grove, where they would lose 5–3, giving them a fourth-place finish in the tournament.

== Scoring leaders ==
GP = Games Played, G = Goals, A = Assists, P = Points, PIM = Penalties In Minutes

Player	Team	GP	G	A	Pts	PIM
Landon Smith	Salmon Arm Silverbacks	58	43	40	83	36
Myles Fitzgerald	Victoria Grizzlies	58	27	56	83	35
Gerry Fitzgerald	Victoria Grizzlies	51	35	46	81	26
Brad McClure	Penticton Vees	58	41	39	80	34
Adam Rockwood	Coquitlam Express	57	13	61	74	26
Michael McNicholas	Vernon Vipers	56	23	46	69	58
Dexter Dancs	Vernon Vipers	56	26	41	67	58
Canon Pieper	Coquitlam Express	57	33	33	66	42
Ryan Rosenthal	Coquitlam Express	50	34	31	65	12
Danton Heinen	Surrey Eagles	57	29	33	62	8

== Leading goaltenders ==
Note: GP = Games Played, Mins = Minutes Played, W = Wins, L = Losses, T = Ties, GA = Goals Against, SO = Shutouts, Sv% = Save Percentage, GAA = Goals Against Average. Regulation losses and overtime losses have been combined for total losses.

Player	Team	GP	Mins	W	L	T	GA	SO	Sv%	GAA
Jayson Argue	Nanaimo Clippers	45	2634	24	19	1	109	3	0.928	2.48
Jeff Smith	Powell River Kings	34	1869	20	10	1	70	3	0.923	2.25
Connor LaCouvee	Alberni Valley Bulldogs	42	2387	23	16	0	110	4	0.920	2.77
Devin Kero	Merritt Centennials	40	2375	19	15	4	98	3	0.918	2.48
Austin Smith	Vernon Vipers	36	2032	18	13	3	89	2	0.917	2.63

== Award winners ==
- Brett Hull Trophy (Top Scorer): Landon Smith (Salmon Arm) & Myles Fitzgerald (Victoria)
- Best Defenceman: Brett Beauvais (Penticton)
- Bruce Allison Memorial Trophy (Rookie of the Year): Danton Heinen (Surrey)
- Bob Fenton Trophy (Most Sportsmanlike): Danton Heinen (Surrey)
- Top Goldender: Jeff Smith (Powell River)
- Wally Forslund Memorial Trophy (Best Goaltending Duo): Oliver Mantha & Hunter Miska (Penticton)
- Vern Dye Memorial Trophy (regular-season MVP): Landon Smith (Salmon Arm)
- Joe Tennant Memorial Trophy (Coach of the Year): Bobby Henderson (Langley)
- Ron Boileau Memorial Trophy (Best Regular Season Record): Langley Rivermen
- Fred Page Cup (League Champions): Coquitlam Express

== Players selected in 2014 NHL entry draft ==
- Rd4 116: Danton Heinen - Boston Bruins (Surrey Eagles)
- Rd5 130: Liam Coughlin - Edmonton oilers (Vernon Vipers)
- Rd5 150: Alec Dillon - Los Angeles Kings (Victoria Grizzlies)
- Rd7 192: Matt Ustaski - Winnipeg Jets (Langley Rivermen)
- Rd7 208: Jack Ramsey - Chicago Blackhawks (Penticton Vees)

== See also ==
- 2014 Royal Bank Cup
- Western Canada Cup
- Mowat Cup
- List of BCHL seasons
- British Columbia Hockey League
- Canadian Junior Hockey League
- 2013 in ice hockey
- 2014 in ice hockey
