= Ice hockey at the 2026 Winter Olympics – Men's tournament =

2026 Winter Olympics

Tournament details
- Host country: Italy
- Venues: 2 (in 1 host city)
- Dates: 11–22 February
- Teams: 12

Final positions
- Champions: United States (3rd title)
- Runners-up: Canada
- Third place: Finland
- Fourth place: Slovakia

Tournament statistics
- Games played: 30
- Goals scored: 188 (6.27 per game)
- Attendance: 288,204 (9,607 per game)
- Scoring leader: (Canada) Connor McDavid (13 points)

Awards
- MVP: (Canada) Connor McDavid

The men's tournament in ice hockey at the 2026 Winter Olympics took place in Milan, Italy, between 11 and 22 February 2026. Twelve countries qualified for the tournament; eight via ranking by the IIHF, three via qualification tournaments, and Italy as hosts. Russia and Belarus were banned from competing due to the countries' invasion of Ukraine.

The United States won their first gold medal since 1980, defeating Canada 2–1 in overtime in the gold medal game. Finland, the defending 2022 Olympic champions, were defeated by Canada in the semifinals and won the bronze medal over 2022 bronze medalists Slovakia.

== Venues ==
Ice hockey at the 2026 Winter Olympics venues
Milan
PalaItalia (Milano Santagiulia Ice Hockey Arena)	Fiera Milano (Milano Rho Ice Hockey Arena)
Capacity: 16,000 (11,800 of which for the public)	Capacity: 6,500
	Fiera Milano

== Qualified teams ==
Event	Date	Location	Vacancies	Qualified
Hosts	24 June 2019	(Switzerland) Lausanne	1	Italy
2023 IIHF World Ranking	2 June 2023	—N/a	7	Canada; Finland; United States; Germany; Sweden; Switzerland; Czech Republic
Final qualification tournaments	29 August – 1 September 2024	(Slovakia) Bratislava	1	Slovakia
Final qualification tournaments	29 August – 1 September 2024	(Latvia) Riga	2	Latvia; France
Final qualification tournaments	29 August – 1 September 2024	(Denmark) Aalborg	1	Denmark
Total			12	

Notes

1. ^{a} The 2023 IIHF World Ranking comprised the following events: 2020 World Championship, 2021 World Championship, 2022 Winter Olympic Games, 2022 World Championship and 2023 World Championship.
2. ^{b} Tampere and Riga were the sites of the 2023 IIHF World Championship; at the conclusion of the tournament the ranking and direct qualification slots were finalized.
3. ^{c} France replaced banned Russia both in the men's and women's tournament, filling the final seed in both.

== Format ==
The twelve teams were split into three groups of four teams, and played each team in the group once. A knockout system was used after the group stage. The top team of each group and the best second-ranked team advanced to the quarterfinals, while all other teams played in the qualification playoffs.

== Rosters ==
=== NHL participation ===
On 2 February 2024, the IIHF announced that an agreement had been reached with the National Hockey League (NHL) for a break in its regular season to allow the league's players to participate in the Olympics for the first time since 2014. The NHL was originally scheduled to compete in 2022 as well but opted out due to the COVID-19 pandemic.

== Officials ==
14 referees and 12 linesmen were selected for the tournament, consisting of both IIHF and NHL officials.

Referees		Linesmen	
(Latvia) Andris Ansons (IIHF); (Canada) Michael Campbell (IIHF); (Canada) Gord Dwyer (NHL); (Canada) Eric Furlatt (NHL); (Sweden) Christopher Holm (IIHF); (Sweden) Michael Holm (IIHF); (Czech Republic) Jan Hribik (IIHF)	(United States) Sean MacFarlane (IIHF); (Canada) Wes McCauley (NHL); (Canada) Dan O'Rourke (NHL); (United States) Brian Pochmara (NHL); (Canada) Kyle Rehman (NHL); (United States) Chris Rooney (NHL); (Germany) André Schrader (IIHF)	(Denmark) Albert Ankerstjerne (IIHF); (United States) Nick Briganti (IIHF); (Canada) David Brisebois (NHL); (Canada) Scott Cherrey (NHL); (United States) Ryan Daisy (NHL); (United States) Jake Davis (IIHF)	(Finland) Onni Hautamäki (IIHF); (Czech Republic) Daniel Hynek (IIHF); (Canada) Matt MacPherson (NHL); (Canada) Jonny Murray (NHL); (Czech Republic) Libor Suchánek (NHL); (Canada) Tarrington Wyonzek (IIHF)

== Preliminary round ==
All times are local (UTC+1).

=== Tiebreak criteria ===
In each group, teams were ranked according to the following criteria:

1. Number of points (three points for a regulation-time win, two points for an overtime or shootout win, one point for an overtime or shootout defeat, no points for a regulation-time defeat);
2. In case two teams were tied on points, the result of their head-to-head game determined the ranking;
3. In case three or four teams were tied on points, the following criteria applied (if, after applying a criterion, only two teams remained tied, the result of their head-to-head game determined their ranking):
  1. Points obtained in head-to-head games between the teams concerned;
  2. Goal differential in head-to-head games between the teams concerned;
  3. Number of goals scored in head-to-head games between the teams concerned;
  4. If three teams remained tied, result of head-to-head games between each of the teams concerned and the remaining team in the group (points, goal difference, goals scored);
  5. Pre-tournament seeding.

=== Group A ===
Pos	Team	Pld	W	OTW	OTL	L	GF	GA	GD	Pts	Qualification
1	Canada	3	3	0	0	0	20	3	+17	9	Advance to quarterfinals
2	Switzerland	3	1	1	0	1	9	8	+1	5	Advance to qualification playoffs
3	Czechia	3	1	0	1	1	9	12	−3	4	Advance to qualification playoffs
4	France	3	0	0	0	3	5	20	−15	0	Advance to qualification playoffs

Source: IIHF
Rules for classification: Tiebreak criteria

12 February 2026; 12:10	Switzerland	4–0 (2–0, 0–0, 2–0)	France	PalaItalia, Milan; Attendance: 10,627

Game reference

Leonardo Genoni
Goalies
Antoine Keller
Referees:
(United States) Brian Pochmara
(Germany) André Schrader
Linesmen:
(United States) Jake Davis
(United States) Jonny Murray

Riat (Andrighetto, Kurashev) (PP) – 00:55	1–0
Moser (Fora) – 03:06	2–0
Meier (Josi, Kukan) – 50:08	3–0
Meier (Moser, Fiala) – 56:13	4–0

8 min
Penalties
10 min
43
Shots
27

12 February 2026; 16:40	Czechia	0–5 (0–1, 0–2, 0–2)	Canada	PalaItalia, Milan; Attendance: 11,451

Game reference

Lukáš Dostál
Goalies
Jordan Binnington
Referees:
(Sweden) Michael Holm
(Canada) Wes McCauley
Linesmen:
(United States) Nick Briganti
(Canada) Scott Cherrey

0–1	19:54 – Celebrini (Makar, McDavid)
0–2	26:40 – Stone (Marner, Crosby)
0–3	37:26 – Horvat (Marchand, Harley)
0–4	47:42 – MacKinnon (McDavid, Crosby) (PP)
0–5	53:22 – Suzuki (McDavid, Harley)

6 min
Penalties
2 min
26
Shots
36

13 February 2026; 16:40	France	3–6 (0–2, 3–2, 0–2)	Czechia	PalaItalia, Milan; Attendance: 11,174

Game reference

Martin Neckar
Julian Junca
Goalies
Daniel Vladař
Referees:
(Latvia) Andris Ansons
(Canada) Eric Furlatt
Linesmen:
(Canada) Matt MacPherson
(Canada) Tarrington Wyonzek

	0–1	05:56 – Nečas (Pastrňák, Hronek) (PP)
	0–2	13:04 – Kempný (Stránský, Faksa)
Boudon (Da Costa, Auvitu) (PP) – 21:01	1–2
Boudon (Bertrand) – 24:04	2–2
Gallet (Bertrand, Boudon) – 25:54	3–2
	3–3	33:23 – Pastrňák (Palát, Kempný)
	3–4	39:28 – Stránský (Faksa, Hronek) (SH)
	3–5	41:05 – Chlapík (Nečas, Kämpf)
	3–6	41:53 – Červenka (Sedlák, Špaček)

6 min
Penalties
4 min
12
Shots
38

13 February 2026; 21:10	Canada	5–1 (2–1, 1–0, 2–0)	Switzerland	PalaItalia, Milan; Attendance: 11,510

Game reference

Logan Thompson
Goalies
Akira Schmid
Referees:
(Czech Republic) Jan Hribik
(Canada) Dan O'Rourke
Linesmen:
(Denmark) Albert Ankerstjerne
(Canada) David Brisebois

McDavid (MacKinnon, Makar) (PP) – 05:45	1–0
Harley (McDavid, Wilson) – 10:54	2–0
	2–1	12:42 – Suter (Andrighetto, Kukan) (PP)
Celebrini (MacKinnon) (PP) – 24:14	3–1
Crosby (Marner, Makar) – 47:28	4–1
MacKinnon (McDavid, Celebrini) – 53:03	5–1

6 min
Penalties
6 min
39
Shots
25

15 February 2026; 12:10	Switzerland	4–3 OT (0–1, 2–0, 1–2) (OT: 1–0)	Czechia	PalaItalia, Milan; Attendance: 11,263

Game reference

Leonardo Genoni
Goalies
Lukáš Dostál
Referees:
(Canada) Michael Campbell
(United States) Chris Rooney
Linesmen:
(Finland) Onni Hautamäki
(Czech Republic) Libor Suchánek

	0–1	15:19 – Chlapík (Nečas, Kämpf)
Josi (Moser, Jäger) – 36:53	1–1
Meier (Josi, Hischier) (PP) – 38:37	2–1
	2–2	46:33 – Šimek (Chlapík, Nečas)
Suter (Moser, Meier) – 48:07	3–2
	3–3	57:54 – Nečas (Hronek, Pastrňák) (EA)
Kukan – 61:49	4–3

8 min
Penalties
6 min
29
Shots
32

15 February 2026; 16:40	Canada	10–2 (3–1, 3–0, 4–1)	France	PalaItalia, Milan; Attendance: 11,498

Game reference

Jordan Binnington
Goalies
Julian Junca
Antoine Keller
Referees:
(Sweden) Christopher Holm
(United States) Kyle Rehman
Linesmen:
(United States) Ryan Daisy
(Czech Republic) Daniel Hynek

Wilson (Doughty, McDavid) – 08:41	1–0
	1–1	08:54 – Douay (Addamo)
Toews (Crosby, Makar) – 09:33	2–1
Stone (SH) – 19:56	3–1
Makar (McDavid, Crosby) (PP) – 32:10	4–1
Celebrini (PS) – 37:16	5–1
Crosby (Stone) – 37:35	6–1
McDavid (Celebrini, Wilson) – 40:20	7–1
	7–2	41:28 – Treille (Addamo, Crinon)
Horvat (Reinhart, Bennett) – 45:14	8–2
Hagel (MacKinnon, Theodore) – 50:46	9–2
Celebrini (Stone, Marner) (PP) – 51:47	10–2

33 min
Penalties
35 min
46
Shots
14

=== Group B ===
Pos	Team	Pld	W	OTW	OTL	L	GF	GA	GD	Pts	Qualification
1	Slovakia	3	2	0	0	1	10	8	+2	6 (Note: Head-to-head points: 3 each. Head-to-head goal difference: Slovakia +1; Finland 0; Sweden −1.)	Advance to quarterfinals
2	Finland	3	2	0	0	1	16	5	+11	6	Advance to quarterfinals
3	Sweden	3	2	0	0	1	11	9	+2	6	Advance to qualification playoffs
4	Italy (H)	3	0	0	0	3	4	19	−15	0	Advance to qualification playoffs

Source: IIHF
Rules for classification: Tiebreak criteria
(H) Host
Notes:

11 February 2026; 16:40	Slovakia	4–1 (1–0, 0–1, 3–0)	Finland	PalaItalia, Milan; Attendance: 11,025

Game reference

Samuel Hlavaj
Goalies
Juuse Saros
Referees:
(Canada) Eric Furlatt
(United States) Sean MacFarlane
Linesmen:
(United States) Ryan Daisy
(Canada) Tarrington Wyonzek

Slafkovský – 07:45	1–0
	1–1	24:15 – Tolvanen (Armia, Lehkonen)
Dvorský (Gernát, Liška) – 47:20	2–1
Slafkovský (Nemec, Dvorský) (PP) – 50:30	3–1
Ružička (Tatar, Slafkovský) (EN) – 57:39	4–1

4 min
Penalties
4 min
25
Shots
40

11 February 2026; 21:10	Sweden	5–2 (2–1, 1–1, 2–0)	Italy	PalaItalia, Milan; Attendance: 11,251

Game reference

Filip Gustavsson
Goalies
Damian Clara
Davide Fadani
Referees:
(Czech Republic) Jan Hribik
(Canada) Dan O'Rourke
Linesmen:
(Canada) David Brisebois
(Finland) Onni Hautamäki

	0–1	04:14 – Frigo
Landeskog (Zibanejad, Karlsson) (PP)– 09:06	1–1
Forsling (Raymond, Bratt) – 17:53	2–1
	2–2	20:37 – Bradley (Gazley, Larkin)
Nylander (Dahlin, Kempe) – 36:46	3–2
Zibanejad (Dahlin, Rakell) – 55:42	4–2
Hedman (Forsling) (EN) – 57:11	5–2

2 min
Penalties
2 min
60
Shots
22

13 February 2026; 12:10	Finland	4–1 (2–0, 1–1, 1–0)	Sweden	PalaItalia, Milan; Attendance: 11,336

Game reference

Juuse Saros
Goalies
Filip Gustavsson
Referees:
(Canada) Gord Dwyer
(United States) Chris Rooney
Linesmen:
(Canada) Scott Cherrey
(United States) Jake Davis

Matinpalo (Kakko, Määttä) – 07:44	1–0
Lundell (Luostarinen, Mikkola) – 15:29	2–0
	2–1	24:39 – Dahlin (Nylander, Raymond)
Armia (Haula, Lindell) (SH) – 32:47	3–1
Rantanen (Granlund, Hintz) (EN) – 59:25	4–1

18 min
Penalties
14 min
24
Shots
35

13 February 2026; 12:10	Italy	2–3 (0–0, 1–2, 1–1)	Slovakia	Fiera Milano, Milan; Attendance: 3,986

Game reference

Davide Fadani
Damian Clara
Goalies
Stanislav Škorvánek
Referees:
(United States) Brian Pochmara
(Germany) André Schrader
Linesmen:
(United States) Nick Briganti
(United States) Jonny Murray

	0–1	23:51 – Hudáček (Slafkovský, Dvorský) (PP)
	0–2	33:45 – Sukeľ (Liška, Cingel)
Bradley (Pietroniro, Gazley) (PP) – 37:06	1–2
	1–3	51:54 – Ružička (Regenda, Gernát)
Gazley (Larkin, Pietroniro) (EA) – 56:25	2–3

12 min
Penalties
12 min
22
Shots
38

14 February 2026; 12:10	Sweden	5–3 (1–1, 2–1, 2–1)	Slovakia	PalaItalia, Milan; Attendance: 11,332

Game reference

Jacob Markström
Goalies
Samuel Hlavaj
Referees:
(Latvia) Andris Ansons
(United States) Kyle Rehman
Linesmen:
(Czech Republic) Daniel Hynek
(Czech Republic) Libor Suchánek

Eriksson Ek (Kempe) (SH) – 07:17	1–0
	1–1	08:59 – Slafkovský (Nemec, Gernát)
Kempe (Dahlin, Raymond) (PP) – 27:06	2–1
	2–2	29:48 – Gernát (Čerešňák, Ružička)
Pettersson (Forsberg, Hedman) – 34:29	3–2
Pettersson (Raymond, Karlsson) – 47:57	4–2
Raymond (Zibanejad, Karlsson) – 51:38	5–2
	5–3	59:21 – Dvorský (Slafkovský, Čerešňák) (PP)

14 min
Penalties
14 min
51
Shots
32

14 February 2026; 16:40	Finland	11–0 (3–0, 3–0, 5–0)	Italy	PalaItalia, Milan; Attendance: 11,508

Game reference

Juuse Saros
Goalies
Damian Clara
Davide Fadani
Referees:
(Sweden) Christopher Holm
(Canada) Wes McCauley
Linesmen:
(Denmark) Albert Ankerstjerne
(Canada) Matt MacPherson

Aho (Rantanen, Lehkonen) – 06:49	1–0
Granlund (Rantanen, Heiskanen) (PP) – 09:31	2–0
Kakko (Mikkola, Ristolainen) – 10:18	3–0
Kiviranta (Mikkola, Ristolainen) – 24:04	4–0
Kakko (Luostarinen) – 27:39	5–0
Granlund (Kakko, Luostarinen) – 37:36	6–0
Heiskanen (Rantanen, Aho) (PP) – 41:01	7–0
Lehkonen (Teräväinen) – 41:34	8–0
Aho (Lehkonen, Jokiharju) – 43:43	9–0
Armia (Haula) – 53:26	10–0
Kiviranta (Armia, Haula) – 57:13	11–0

0 min
Penalties
8 min
62
Shots
15

=== Group C ===
Pos	Team	Pld	W	OTW	OTL	L	GF	GA	GD	Pts	Qualification
1	United States	3	3	0	0	0	16	5	+11	9	Advance to quarterfinals
2	Germany	3	1	0	0	2	7	10	−3	3 (Note: Head-to-head points: 3 each. Head-to-head goal difference: Germany +1; Denmark 0; Latvia −1.)	Advance to qualification playoffs
3	Denmark	3	1	0	0	2	8	11	−3	3	Advance to qualification playoffs
4	Latvia	3	1	0	0	2	7	12	−5	3	Advance to qualification playoffs

Source: IIHF
Rules for classification: Tiebreak criteria
Notes:

12 February 2026; 21:10	Latvia	1–5 (1–1, 0–3, 0–1)	United States	PalaItalia, Milan; Attendance: 11,288

Game reference

Elvis Merzļikins
Artūrs Šilovs
Goalies
Connor Hellebuyck
Referees:
(Canada) Michael Campbell
(United States) Kyle Rehman
Linesmen:
(Denmark) Albert Ankerstjerne
(Czech Republic) Libor Suchánek

	0–1	05:29 – B. Tkachuk (M. Tkachuk, Werenski)
Krastenbergs (Girgensons) – 07:25	1–1
	1–2	30:38 – Nelson (J. Hughes, Trocheck)
	1–3	37:35 – Thompson (Eichel, Q. Hughes) (PP)
	1–4	39:48 – Nelson (J. Hughes, M. Tkachuk)
	1–5	42:35 – Matthews (Eichel, Q. Hughes) (PP)

8 min
Penalties
8 min
18
Shots
38

12 February 2026; 21:10	Germany	3–1 (1–1, 2–0, 0–0)	Denmark	Fiera Milano, Milan; Attendance: 3,986

Game reference

Philipp Grubauer
Goalies
Frederik Andersen
Referees:
(Latvia) Andris Ansons
(Sweden) Christopher Holm
Linesmen:
(Czech Republic) Daniel Hynek
(Canada) Matt MacPherson

Draisaitl (Tiffels, Wagner) – 00:23	1–0
	1–1	13:09 – Mølgaard (Ehlers, Jensen Aabo)
Stützle (Peterka, Stachowiak) – 24:20	2–1
Stutzle (Draisaitl, Seider) (PP) – 30:02	3–1

0 min
Penalties
4 min
26
Shots
38

14 February 2026; 12:10	Germany	3–4 (2–1, 0–1, 1–2)	Latvia	Fiera Milano, Milan; Attendance: 4,033

Game reference

Philipp Grubauer
Goalies
Artūrs Šilovs
Referees:
(Canada) Gord Dwyer
(United States) Sean MacFarlane
Linesmen:
(Canada) Scott Cherrey
(Finland) Onni Hautamäki

Reichel (Kahun, Kälble) – 02:06	1–0
	1–1	15:48 – Ločmelis (Girgensons, Krastenbergs) (PP)
Kälble (Tiffels) – 16:56	2–1
	2–2	28:02 – Ločmelis (Balcers, Balinskis) (PP2)
	2–3	48:32 – Tralmaks (Girgensons, Jaks)
	2–4	51:37 – Krastenbergs (Daugaviņš, Šmits)
Stützle (Draisaitl, Peterka) (EA) – 57:41	3–4

8 min
Penalties
8 min
29
Shots
22

14 February 2026; 21:10	United States	6–3 (1–2, 3–1, 2–0)	Denmark	PalaItalia, Milan; Attendance: 11,480

Game reference

Jeremy Swayman
Goalies
Mads Søgaard
Frederik Dichow
Referees:
(Sweden) Michael Holm
(Canada) Dan O'Rourke
Linesmen:
(United States) Ryan Daisy
(Canada) Tarrington Wyonzek

	0–1	01:40 – Olesen (Mølgaard, Aagaard)
Boldy (Q. Hughes, Slavin) – 03:35	1–1
	1–2	11:16 – Jensen (Setkov)
B. Tkachuk (Eichel) – 29:26	2–2
Eichel (M. Tkachuk) – 30:23	3–2
Hanifin (Trocheck, Faber) – 37:23	4–2
	4–3	39:57 – Bruggisser (Ehlers, True)
Guentzel (Matthews) – 47:24	5–3
J. Hughes (Nelson) – 54:27	6–3

6 min
Penalties
4 min
47
Shots
21

15 February 2026; 19:10	Denmark	4–2 (3–1, 0–1, 1–0)	Latvia	Fiera Milano, Milan; Attendance: 3,983

Game reference

Frederik Andersen
Goalies
Artūrs Šilovs
Referees:
(Canada) Eric Furlatt
(Germany) André Schrader
Linesmen:
(Canada) David Brisebois
(United States) Jake Davis

Olesen (Aagaard) – 00:23	1–0
Aagaard (Olesen, Wejse) (PP) – 04:54	2–0
Ehlers (Bjorkstrand, Lauridsen) – 16:28	3–0
	3–1	19:44 – Zīle (Jaks, Tralmaks) (EA)
	3–2	26:47 – Tralmaks (Zīle, Girgensons)
Olesen (Lauridsen, Eller) (EN) – 57:38	4–2

10 min
Penalties
10 min
21
Shots
35

15 February 2026; 21:10	United States	5–1 (1–0, 2–0, 2–1)	Germany	PalaItalia, Milan; Attendance: 11,497

Game reference

Connor Hellebuyck
Goalies
Maximilian Franzreb
Referees:
(Czech Republic) Jan Hribik
(Canada) Wes McCauley
Linesmen:
(United States) Nick Briganti
(Canada) Jonny Murray

Werenski (Matthews) – 19:51	1–0
Matthews (Q. Hughes, M. Tkachuk) (PP) – 23:25	2–0
Faber (M. Tkachuk, B. Tkachuk – 37:35	3–0
Thompson (Larkin, Sanderson) – 41:55	4–0
Matthews (Sanderson, Hanifin) – 46:46	5–0
	5–1	51:22 – Stützle (Peterka)

6 min
Penalties
4 min
37
Shots
24

=== Ranking after preliminary round ===
Following the completion of the preliminary round, all teams were ranked 1D through 12D. The semi-finals will be reseeded according to this ranking. To determine this ranking, the following criteria were used in the order presented:

1. higher position in the group
2. higher number of points
3. better goal difference
4. higher number of goals scored for
5. better 2023 IIHF World Ranking.

Team advanced directly to quarterfinals
Team participated in qualification playoffs

Rank	Team	Group	Pos	GP	Pts	GD	GF	IIHF Rank
1D	Canada	A	1	3	9	+17	20	1
2D	United States	C	1	3	9	+11	16	4
3D	Slovakia	B	1	3	6	+2	10	9
4D	Finland	B	2	3	6	+11	16	2
5D	Switzerland	A	2	3	5	+1	9	7
6D	Germany	C	2	3	3	–3	7	5
7D	Sweden	B	3	3	6	+2	11	6
8D	Czechia	A	3	3	4	–3	9	8
9D	Denmark	C	3	3	3	–3	8	11
10D	Latvia	C	4	3	3	–5	7	10
11D	France	A	4	3	0	–15	5	13
12D	Italy	B	4	3	0	–15	4	18

Source: IIHF

== Playoff round ==
Gold medal game, starting line-ups

=== Bracket ===
Teams were reseeded after the quarterfinals based on the preliminary round ranking.

Qualification playoffs
17 February – Milan (PalaItalia)
Czechia	3
Denmark	2
17 February – Milan (PalaItalia)
Sweden	5
Latvia	1
17 February – Milan (PalaItalia)
Germany	5
France	1
17 February – Milan (Fiera Milano)
Switzerland	3
Italy	0

Quarterfinals
18 February – Milan (PalaItalia)
Canada (OT)	4
Czechia	3
18 February – Milan (PalaItalia)
United States (OT)	2
Sweden	1
18 February – Milan (PalaItalia)
Slovakia	6
Germany	2
18 February – Milan (Fiera Milano)
Finland (OT)	3
Switzerland	2

Semifinals
20 February – Milan (PalaItalia)
Canada	3
Finland	2
20 February – Milan (PalaItalia)
United States	6
Slovakia	2

Gold medal game
22 February – Milan (PalaItalia)
Canada	1
United States (OT)	2
Bronze medal game
21 February – Milan (PalaItalia)
Slovakia	1
Finland	6

=== Qualification playoffs ===
17 February 2026; 12:10	Germany	5–1 (3–0, 0–1, 2–0)	France	PalaItalia, Milan; Attendance: 9,788

Game reference

Philipp Grubauer
Goalies
Julian Junca
Antoine Keller
Referees:
(Canada) Michael Campbell
(Sweden) Christopher Holm
Linesmen:
(Denmark) Albert Ankerstjerne
(Canada) David Brisebois

Draisaitl (Samanski, Stützle) (PP) – 03:40	1–0
Tiffels – 10:54	2–0
Peterka (Stützle) – 18:13	3–0
	3–1	24:02 – Bellemare (Perret)
Samanski (Draisaitl, Seider) (PP) – 47:01	4–1
Sturm (Draisaitl, Rieder) (EN) – 59:04	5–1

4 min
Penalties
6 min
36
Shots
31

17 February 2026; 12:10	Switzerland	3–0 (2–0, 0–0, 1–0)	Italy	Fiera Milano, Milan; Attendance: 3,827

Game reference

Leonardo Genoni
Goalies
Damian Clara
Referees:
(Czech Republic) Jan Hribik
(Germany) André Schrader
Linesmen:
(Czech Republic) Libor Suchánek
(Canada) Tarrington Wyonzek

Kurashev (Hischier, Meier) – 01:19	1–0
Josi (Andrighetto, Hischier) (PP) – 10:25	2–0
Hischier (Riat, Meier) (PP) – 45:53	3–0

6 min
Penalties
12 min
51
Shots
20

17 February 2026; 16:40	Czechia	3–2 (0–0, 3–2, 0–0)	Denmark	PalaItalia, Milan; Attendance: 10,364

Game reference

Lukáš Dostál
Goalies
Frederik Andersen
Referees:
(Canada) Dan O'Rourke
(United States) Kyle Rehman
Linesmen:
(United States) Nick Briganti
(United States) Jake Davis

Nečas (Hronek, Červenka) (PP) – 25:39	1–0
	1–1	29:02 – True (Blichfeld)
Kämpf (Rutta, Nečas) – 30:15	2–1
Červenka (Pastrňák) – 31:24	3–1
	3–2	37:12 – Olesen (Mølgaard, Blichfeld) (PP)

8 min
Penalties
4 min
31
Shots
26

17 February 2026; 21:10	Sweden	5–1 (2–0, 1–1, 2–0)	Latvia	PalaItalia, Milan; Attendance: 11,088

Game reference

Jacob Markström
Goalies
Elvis Merzļikins
Referees:
(Canada) Gord Dwyer
(United States) Sean MacFarlane
Linesmen:
(Czech Republic) Daniel Hynek
(United States) Jonny Murray

Kempe (Eriksson Ek, Nylander) – 10:55	1–0
Landeskog (Raymond, Zibanejad) – 11:36	2–0
Forsberg (Karlsson, Broberg) – 27:36	3–0
	3–1	30:47 – Tralmaks (Smits, Bļugers)
Zibanejad (Raymond, Landeskog) – 45:54	4–1
Nylander (Raymond, Dahlin) – 53:18	5–1

6 min
Penalties
4 min
28
Shots
21

=== Quarterfinals ===
18 February 2026; 12:10	Slovakia	6–2 (1–0, 3–1, 2–1)	Germany	PalaItalia, Milan; Attendance: 9,532

Game reference

Samuel Hlavaj
Goalies
Philipp Grubauer
Referees:
(Canada) Dan O'Rourke
(United States) Kyle Rehman
Linesmen:
(Denmark) Albert Ankerstjerne
(Canada) Matt MacPherson

Regenda (Černák, Fehérváry) – 18:06	1–0
Kelemen (Regenda) – 24:01	2–0
Okuliar (Hudáček, Dvorský) – 24:34	3–0
	3–1	34:59 – Reichel (Draisaitl)
Dvorský (Okuliar, Koch) – 30:21	4–1
Regenda (Koch, Pospíšil) – 40:58	5–1
	5–2	49:09 – Tiffels (Reichel, Müller) (PP)
Tatar (Ružička, Slafkovský) (EN) – 56:33	6–2

8 min
Penalties
6 min
35
Shots
27

18 February 2026; 16:40	Canada	4–3 OT (1–2, 1–0, 1–1) (OT: 1–0)	Czechia	PalaItalia, Milan; Attendance: 10,984

Game reference

Jordan Binnington
Goalies
Lukáš Dostál
Referees:
(Sweden) Mikael Holm
(United States) Chris Rooney
Linesmen:
(Canada) David Brisebois
(United States) Jonny Murray

Celebrini (McDavid) – 03:05	1–0
	1–1	08:34 – Sedlák (Červenka, Gudas)
	1–2	14:49 – Pastrňák (Hronek, Červenka) (PP)
MacKinnon (McDavid, Celebrini) (PP) – 32:16	2–2
	2–3	52:18 – Palát (Nečas, Hertl)
Suzuki (Toews, Jarvis) – 56:33	3–3
Marner (Celebrini, Harley) – 61:22	4–3

4 min
Penalties
6 min
41
Shots
24

18 February 2026; 18:10	Finland	3–2 OT (0–2, 0–0, 2–0) (OT: 1–0)	Switzerland	Fiera Milano, Milan; Attendance: 3,090

Game reference

Juuse Saros
Goalies
Leonardo Genoni
Referees:
(Canada) Michael Campbell
(Canada) Gord Dwyer
Linesmen:
(United States) Ryan Daisy
(Czech Republic) Libor Suchánek

	0–1	14:14 – Riat (Jäger)
	0–2	15:26 – Niederreiter (Suter, Kurashev)
Aho (Luostarinen, Lindell) – 53:54	1–2
Heiskanen (Hintz, Rantanen) (EA) – 58:48	2–2
Lehkonen (Lundell, Lindell) – 63:23	3–2

4 min
Penalties
4 min
31
Shots
23

18 February 2026; 21:10	United States	2–1 OT (0–0, 1–0, 0–1) (OT: 1–0)	Sweden	PalaItalia, Milan; Attendance: 11,097

Game reference

Connor Hellebuyck
Goalies
Jacob Markström
Referees:
(Canada) Eric Furlatt
(Canada) Wes McCauley
Linesmen:
(Canada) Scott Cherrey
(Finland) Onni Hautamäki

Larkin (J. Hughes, Q. Hughes) – 31:03	1–0
	1–1	58:29 – Zibanejad (Raymond, Landeskog) (EA)
Q. Hughes (Boldy, Matthews) – 63:27	2–1

2 min
Penalties
4 min
40
Shots
29

=== Semifinals ===
20 February 2026; 16:40	Canada	3–2 (0–1, 1–1, 2–0)	Finland	PalaItalia, Milan; Attendance: 11,155

Game reference

Jordan Binnington
Goalies
Juuse Saros
Referees:
(Canada) Eric Furlatt
(Canada) Dan O'Rourke
Linesmen:
(Denmark) Albert Ankerstjerne
(United States) Ryan Daisy

	0–1	16:55 – Rantanen (Aho) (PP)
	0–2	23:26 – Haula (Armia) (SH)
Reinhart (Makar, McDavid) (PP) – 34:20	1–2
Theodore (Sanheim, Wilson) – 50:34	2–2
MacKinnon (McDavid, Celebrini) (PP) – 59:24	3–2

4 min
Penalties
8 min
39
Shots
17

20 February 2026; 21:10	United States	6–2 (2–0, 3–0, 1–2)	Slovakia	PalaItalia, Milan; Attendance: 11,240

Game reference

Connor Hellebuyck
Goalies
Samuel Hlavaj
Stanislav Škorvánek
Referees:
(Canada) Gord Dwyer
(United States) Chris Rooney
Linesmen:
(Canada) Scott Cherrey
(Finland) Onni Hautamäki

Larkin (Werenski, Thompson) – 04:19	1–0
Thompson (Eichel, Q. Hughes) (PP) – 19:19	2–0
J. Hughes (Werenzki) – 32:14	3–0
Eichel (B. Tkachuk, M. Tkachuk) – 32:33	4–0
J. Hughes (Werenski, Boldy) – 38:24	5–0
	5–1	44:55 – Slafkovský (Ružička, Fehérváry)
B. Tkachuk (Trocheck, Hanifin) – 50:52	6–1
	6–2	53:17 – Regenda (Kelemen, Fehérváry)

30 min
Penalties
20 min
39
Shots
24

=== Bronze medal game ===
21 February 2026; 20:40	Slovakia	1–6 (0–1, 1–1, 0–4)	Finland	PalaItalia, Milan; Attendance: 10,522

Game reference

Samuel Hlavaj
Goalies
Juuse Saros
Referees:
(Canada) Michael Campbell
(Sweden) Michael Holm
Linesmen:
(Czech Republic) Daniel Hynek
(Czech Republic) Libor Suchánek

	0–1	07:27 – Aho (Lehkonen, Heiskanen)
	0–2	28:05 – Haula (Armia, Tolvanen)
Tatar (Fehérváry) – 39:30	1–2
	1–3	48:27 – Hintz (Heiskanen, Tolvanen) (PP)
	1–4	49:09 – Kakko
	1–5	55:32 – Armia (Hintz) (EN)
	1–6	58:42 – Haula (Armia, Ristolainen) (EN)

6 min
Penalties
4 min
31
Shots
35

=== Gold medal game ===
22 February 2026; 14:10	Canada	1–2 OT (0–1, 1–0, 0–0) (OT: 0–1)	United States	PalaItalia, Milan; Attendance: 11,289

Game reference

Jordan Binnington
Goalies
Connor Hellebuyck
Referees:
(Canada) Gord Dwyer
(United States) Chris Rooney
Linesmen:
(Canada) Scott Cherrey
(Finland) Onni Hautamäki

	0–1	06:00 – Boldy (Matthews, Q. Hughes)
Makar (Toews) – 38:16	1–1
	1–2	61:41 – J. Hughes (Werenski, Hellebuyck)

6 min
Penalties
6 min
42
Shots
28

The gold medal game was played on 22 February 2026 at PalaItalia in Milan. The United States defeated Canada 2–1 in overtime, claiming the country's first men's Olympic ice hockey gold medal in the event since the 1980 Winter Olympics. Coincidentally, the game took place on the 46th anniversary of the "Miracle on Ice".

Jack Hughes scored the winning goal 1 minute 41 seconds into overtime, assisted by Zach Werenski and goaltender Connor Hellebuyck, who made 41 saves in regulation and overtime, as Canada outshot the United States 42–28. Hellebuyck was named Best Goaltender of the tournament and Quinn Hughes Best Defenceman by the Tournament Directorate. The United States finished the tournament with a 6–0 record, outscoring opponents 26–9. Canada played without captain Sidney Crosby, who was sidelined after an injury in the quarterfinals against Czechia. Connor McDavid led all scorers with 13 points and was named the tournament's MVP by the Directorate.

== Medalists ==
Event	Gold	Silver	Bronze
Men's tournament	United States; Jeremy Swayman (G); Jackson LaCombe; Brady Tkachuk; Zach Werenski; Jack Eichel; J.T. Miller; Matt Boldy; Brock Faber; Noah Hanifin; Vincent Trocheck; Matthew Tkachuk (A); Dylan Larkin; Charlie McAvoy (A); Brock Nelson; Jake Oettinger (G); Auston Matthews (C); Connor Hellebuyck (G); Quinn Hughes; Jake Guentzel; Tage Thompson; Jaccob Slavin; Kyle Connor; Jake Sanderson; Jack Hughes; Clayton Keller Head coach: Mike Sullivan	Canada; Travis Sanheim; Devon Toews; Cale Makar (A); Sam Bennett; Nick Suzuki; Sam Reinhart; Bo Horvat; Macklin Celebrini; Thomas Harley; Seth Jarvis; Shea Theodore; Nathan MacKinnon (A); Darcy Kuemper (G); Brandon Hagel; Tom Wilson; Josh Morrissey; Logan Thompson (G); Jordan Binnington (G); Colton Parayko; Mark Stone; Brad Marchand; Sidney Crosby (C); Drew Doughty; Mitch Marner; Connor McDavid (A)/(C) Head coach: Jon Cooper	Finland; Olli Määttä; Mikko Lehtonen; Henri Jokiharju; Anton Lundell; Sebastian Aho (A); Esa Lindell; Roope Hintz; Eetu Luostarinen; Eeli Tolvanen; Kevin Lankinen (G); Nikolas Matinpalo; Joel Armia; Miro Heiskanen; Rasmus Ristolainen; Erik Haula; Artturi Lehkonen; Mikael Granlund (C); Joonas Korpisalo (G); Juuse Saros (G); Niko Mikkola; Kaapo Kakko; Teuvo Teräväinen; Oliver Kapanen; Joel Kiviranta; Mikko Rantanen (A) Head coach: Antti Pennanen

== Final ranking ==
The gold medal game and bronze medal game determined the top 4 teams. Losers of the quarterfinals were ranked 5th–8th and losers of the qualification playoffs were ranked 9th–12th; within these, teams were ranked according to the preliminary round ranking.

Pos	Grp	Team	Pld	W	OTW	OTL	L	GF	GA	GD	Pts	Final result
1	C	United States	6	4	2	0	0	26	9	+17	16	Champions
2	A	Canada	6	4	1	1	0	28	10	+18	15	Runners-up
3	B	Finland	6	3	1	0	2	27	11	+16	11	Third place
4	B	Slovakia	6	3	0	0	3	19	22	−3	9	Fourth place
5	A	Switzerland	5	2	1	1	1	14	11	+3	9	Eliminated in quarterfinals
6	C	Germany	5	2	0	0	3	14	17	−3	6	Eliminated in quarterfinals
7	B	Sweden	5	3	0	1	1	17	12	+5	10	Eliminated in quarterfinals
8	A	Czechia	5	2	0	2	1	15	18	−3	8	Eliminated in quarterfinals
9	C	Denmark	4	1	0	0	3	10	14	−4	3	Eliminated in qualification playoffs
10	C	Latvia	4	1	0	0	3	8	17	−9	3	Eliminated in qualification playoffs
11	A	France	4	0	0	0	4	6	25	−19	0	Eliminated in qualification playoffs
12	B	Italy (H)	4	0	0	0	4	4	22	−18	0	Eliminated in qualification playoffs

Source: IIHF.com, Olympics.com
(H) Host

2026 Men's Olympic champions

United States
3rd title

== Statistics ==
=== Scoring leaders ===
The list shows the top ten skaters sorted by points, then goals.

Player	GP	G	A	Pts	+/–	PIM	POS
(Canada) Connor McDavid	6	2	11	13	+5	0	F
(Canada) Macklin Celebrini	6	5	5	10	+6	4	F
(Sweden) Lucas Raymond	5	1	8	9	+4	6	F
(Slovakia) Juraj Slafkovský	6	4	4	8	–3	2	F
(Czech Republic) Martin Nečas	5	3	5	8	+1	2	F
(Finland) Joel Armia	6	3	5	8	+7	2	F
(United States) Quinn Hughes	6	1	7	8	+2	0	D
(United States) Jack Hughes	6	4	3	7	+8	2	F
(Canada) Nathan MacKinnon	6	4	3	7	–2	2	F
(Switzerland) Timo Meier	5	3	4	7	+6	0	F

Source: IIHF.com

=== Leading goaltenders ===
The list shows the top five goaltenders, based on save percentage, who have played at least 40% of their team's minutes.

Player	TOI	GA	GAA	SA	SV%	SO
(United States) Connor Hellebuyck	305:08	6	1.18	137	95.62	0
(Switzerland) Leonardo Genoni	245:10	6	1.47	110	94.55	2
(Finland) Juuse Saros	360:27	10	1.66	167	94.01	1
(Sweden) Jacob Markström	182:51	6	1.97	93	93.55	0
(Canada) Jordan Binnington	303:03	9	1.78	109	91.74	1

Source: IIHF.com

== Awards ==
The awards were announced on 22 February 2026.

=== Media All-Stars ===
Position	Player
Goaltender	(United States) Connor Hellebuyck
Defenceman	(United States) Quinn Hughes
Defenceman	(Canada) Cale Makar
Forward	(Canada) Connor McDavid
Forward	(Canada) Macklin Celebrini
Forward	(Slovakia) Juraj Slafkovský
MVP	(Canada) Connor McDavid

=== Individual awards ===
Position	Player
Goaltender	(United States) Connor Hellebuyck
Defenceman	(United States) Quinn Hughes
Forward	(Canada) Connor McDavid

=== Notable firsts ===
Although not an official award, the first known Gordie Howe hat trick in Olympic ice hockey history was achieved by Tom Wilson of Team Canada on 15 February 2026, when he fought French skater Pierre Crinon in retaliation for Crinon's forearm hit to Nathan MacKinnon's jaw earlier in the game. Wilson and Crinon were both ejected from the game for fighting. It was Wilson's first Olympic goal that contributed to the feat.

== Aftermath ==
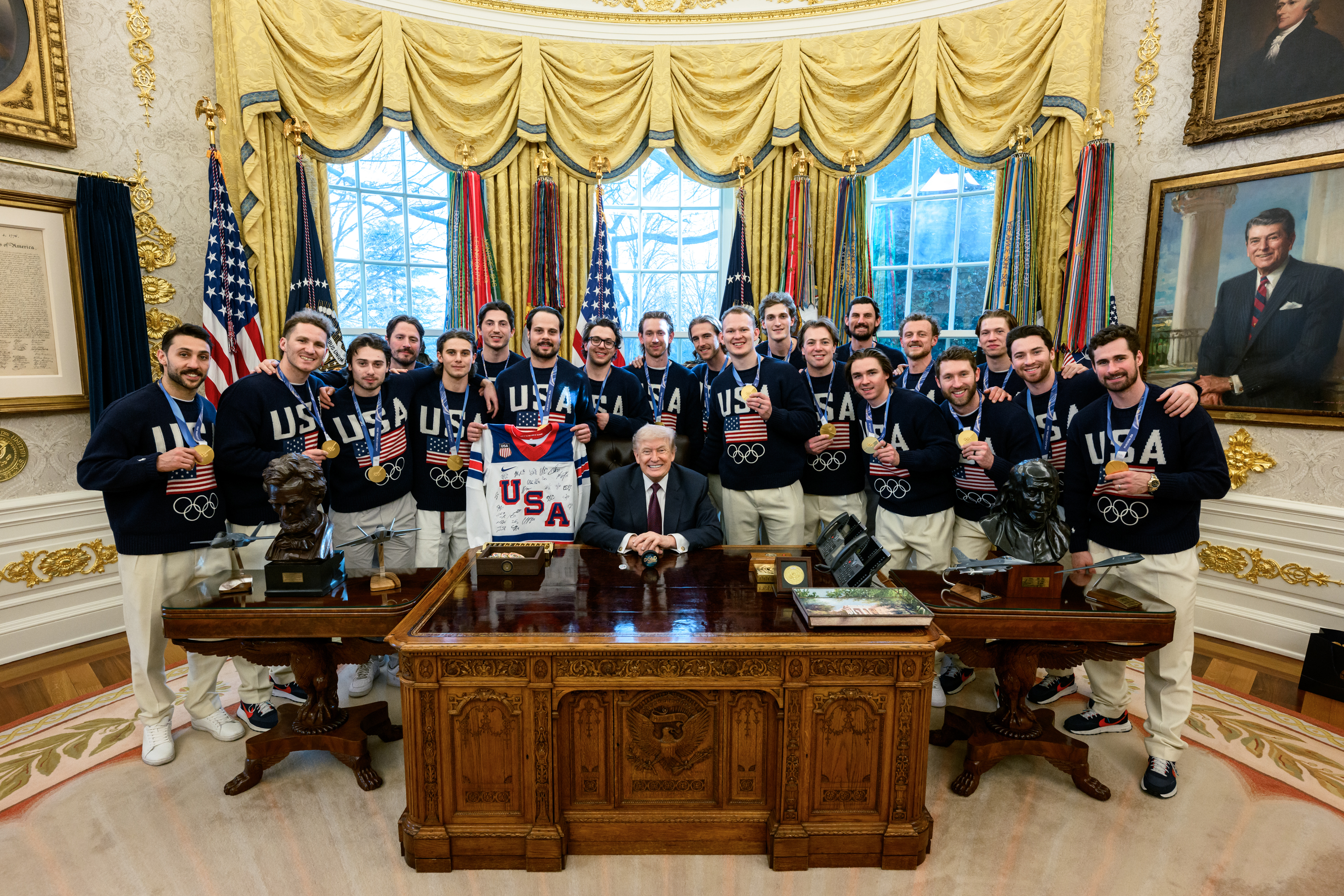
The U.S. Olympic Men's Hockey Team visit President Donald Trump in the Oval Office

United States FBI Director Kash Patel took part in the locker room celebrations of the US men's team after their gold medal win, with Matthew Tkachuk draping a medal around Patel. Patel's presence received criticisms from Democratic politicians, political commentators and others in the American public who questioned his leadership and use of government resources to travel to Milan. Patel had previously said his trip to Italy during the Games was for the purpose of meeting with Italian law enforcement counterparts and American agencies providing security at the event, and later defended his inclusion in the locker room celebration. Patel stated on social media that he had been invited into the locker room by the team to celebrate their win.

External videos
- Director Kash Patel Joins Locker Room Party After US Olympic Hockey Gold - YouTube

Additionally, video of the celebrations showed President Donald Trump calling the men's team to congratulate them on their win while joking about the gold-medal winning US women's ice hockey team. After inviting the men to his State of the Union address, Trump commented "I must tell you we're going to have to bring the women too; you do know that. Believe me, I probably would be impeached, okay?" Players were recorded laughing along with his joke, with at least one player shouting "Absolutely!", and another shouting "two-for-two", reportedly acknowledging gold medal wins by both the men and women's teams. Also heard in the video is an individual shouting to "close the northern border", which was attributed to player Brady Tkachuk, who later denied making the comment. The day after the win, the team landed in Miami after being diverted due to the blizzard in the North East and continued celebrating together at the COTE Korean Steakhouse and E11EVEN Miami.

The resulting video of the inclusion of Patel and the phone call sparked backlash for its sexist nature and potentially diminishing the US women's achievement of winning their third Olympic gold. Additional criticism was raised by members of the American public who felt that players of the men's team should have not laughed, or should have raised an objection during the call or apologized to the women's team members. Dominik Hašek, a Hall of Fame former NHL goalie, called Trump a liar and fraud who used his position to insult and bully others after it was announced that the women's team declined to visit the White House or attend the State of the Union. Female athletes such as Abby Wambach, Julie Foudy, Ilona Maher, and Megan Rapinoe also posted on social media in support of the women's team and to express their outrage at the men's team's conduct and Trump's joke.

Player Jack Hughes later pushed back on accusations that the team was undermining the US women's team's accomplishments, describing the men's team's relationship with the women as "tight", and deriding that "everything is so political" and "people are so negative about things." Player Jeremy Swayman told reporters that the US men's team should have reacted differently to Trump's comments and that there is shared respect and excitement between both teams. Other players like Charlie McAvoy, Jake Sanderson, and captain Auston Matthews also expressed regret for the situation and reiterated their support and appreciation for the women's team and their accomplishments. Others such as Jackson LaCombe stated that Trump was merely trying to be funny during the call, while Brady Tkachuk reasoned he was caught up in the excitement of the moment. US men's hockey general manager Bill Guerin dismissed the backlash, stating "People react to everything nowadays" and that nothing about the celebration was political or meant to harm anyone, and that the win was for the country regardless of political stance, gender or race.

Members of the US Women's Olympic team responded by emphasizing unity between the programs. Captain Hilary Knight described the president's remark as a "distasteful joke", but stated that the focus should remain on the historic achievement of both teams winning Olympic gold. Knight also stressed that the incident could have been a great teaching moment for how women athletes should be championed, but instead, "Now I have to sit...in front of you and explain someone else's behavior. It's not my responsibility." Players Megan Keller and Abbey Murphy similarly noted the close relationship between the men's and women's teams and said there was no underlying animosity, stressing that the dual gold medals were the defining story of the Games. Player Kelly Pannek lamented that while she felt support and respect from the men's team throughout the Games, she felt the phone call and the men's reaction to Trump was unsurprising. Several members of the women's national team appeared to like social media posts critical of both Trump's comments and the actions of the men's national team shortly after the video of the celebration was posted.

Following the call and resulting backlash, the majority of the men's hockey team accepted Trump's invitation to visit the White House and later attend the State of the Union. Five players including Kyle Connor, Jake Guentzel, Brock Nelson, Jackson LaCombe and Jake Oettinger, all declined the invite for a variety of reasons. Players who attended the State of Union were congratulated by Trump and received a standing ovation. During the State of the Union, Trump announced that goalie Connor Hellebuyck would receive the Presidential Medal of Freedom. Following both the gold medal win and backlash, Jack Hughes and his brother Quinn embarked on a media tour, appearing on morning talk shows, Saturday Night Live, and The Tonight Show with women's team members Hilary Knight and Megan Keller. The Hughes brothers' appearance on a Saturday Night Live episode hosted by Connor Storrie, star of the queer hockey show Heated Rivalry, drew backlash from fans and the author of the Heated Rivalry book series Rachel Reid, who felt that Heated Rivalry and the women's national team were being used by the men's national team as part of their damage control.

== Legacy ==
During and following the tournament, the American players paid tribute to teammate Johnny Gaudreau after he and his brother Matthew were killed in 2024 on the eve of their sister Katie's wedding in a crash at the hands of a drunk driver. Gaudreau, who was 31 years-old, was in his 11th NHL season and his second with the Columbus Blue Jackets, and was a member of the United States' 2024 IIHF World Championship roster a few months prior. Family members, including the Gaudreaus' parents, his widow Meredith, and their children Johnny Jr. and Noa, attended the gold medal game, and the American players also kept a Team USA #13 Gaudreau jersey with them and brought it out onto the ice after winning gold. They displayed it in the team photo following the medal ceremony and brought Johnny Jr., who turned two the day of the gold medal game, and Noa out of the stands to join the photo.

The puck that Jack Hughes scored with to win the gold medal game was collected and added to the Hockey Hall of Fame (HHOF) Olympics '26 collection, which includes other artifacts such as jerseys, sticks, and the puck from women's team member Megan Keller's golden goal. Shortly after the game, Hughes stated that he didn't know the status of the puck and that "I sure as hell don't have it", in mid-March, Hughes revisited the topic of the puck, stating it was "bullshit" for the HHOF to have the puck. Hughes initially expressed his desire to present the puck to his father and keep it in the family, while also questioning why Keller was unable to keep her puck. In response, the HHOF released a statement explaining that it has curated defining hockey artifacts provided by the IIHF since the 1998 Winter Olympics, including previous golden goal pucks from Sidney Crosby and Natalie Darwitz. Crosby was asked about Hughes' comments, where he stated that he was happy and honored to score the 2010 goal and didn't really think about keeping the puck. The following day, Hughes clarified his stance, stating he was honored by its inclusion in the HHOF exhibit, and would not pursue the matter further.

== See also ==
- Ice hockey at the Winter Olympics
- Ice hockey at the 2026 Winter Olympics – Women's tournament
