= 2011 Telus Cup =

Tournament details
- Venue: Mile One Centre in St. John's, NL
- Dates: April 18–24, 2011
- Teams: 6

Final positions
- Champions: Winnipeg Thrashers
- Runners-up: London Jr. Knights
- Third place: Lions du Lac St-Louis

Tournament statistics
- Scoring leader(s): Sam Reinhart (7G, 13A, 20P)

Awards
- MVP: Alexander Kerfoot

The 2011 Telus Cup was Canada's 33rd annual national midget 'AAA' hockey championship, played April 18–24, 2011 at the Mile One Centre in St. John's, Newfoundland and Labrador. The Winnipeg Thrashers defeated the London Jr. Knights 3–1 in the gold medal game to win their first national title.

Five future National Hockey League players participated in this tournament: Jonathan Drouin, Anthony Duclair, Mike Matheson, tournament scoring leader Sam Reinhart and MVP Alexander Kerfoot.

== Teams ==
Result	Team	Region	City
1st place, gold medalist(s)	Winnipeg Thrashers	West	Winnipeg, MB
2nd place, silver medalist(s)	London Jr. Knights	Central	London, ON
3rd place, bronze medalist(s)	Lions du Lac St-Louis	Québec	Dollard-des-Ormeaux, QC
4	Vancouver North West Giants	Pacific	Burnaby, BC
5	Halifax Titans	Atlantic	Halifax, NS
6	St. John's Privateers	Host	St. John's, NL

== Round robin ==
=== Standings ===
Pos	Team	Pld	W	L	D	GF	GA	GD	Pts
1	Vancouver North West Giants	5	4	1	0	27	15	+12	8
2	Lions du Lac St-Louis	5	3	2	0	22	14	+8	6
3	Winnipeg Thrashers	5	1	1	3	14	19	−5	5
4	London Jr. Knights	5	1	2	2	15	15	0	4
5	Halifax Titans	5	1	2	2	15	23	−8	4
6	St. John's Privateers	5	1	3	1	14	21	−7	3

=== Scores ===
- Vancouver 12 – Winnipeg 5
- Lac St-Louis 5 – London 4
- Halifax 6 – St. John's 3
- Winnipeg 2 – Lac St-Louis 0
- Vancouver 6 – Halifax 1
- St. John's 5 – London 3
- Lac St-Louis 9 – Halifax 3
- Winnipeg 2 – London 2
- Vancouver 4 – St. John's 3
- London 2 – Halifax 2
- Vancouver 4 – Lac St-Louis 2
- St. John's 2 – Winnipeg 2
- London 4 – Vancouver 1
- Halifax 3 – Winnipeg 3
- Lac St-Louis 6 – St. John's 1

== Playoffs ==
=== Semi-finals ===
- Winnipeg 4 – Lac St-Louis 3 (2OT)
- London 4 – Vancouver 3 (OT)

=== Bronze medal game ===
- Lac St-Louis 5 – Vancouver 3

=== Gold medal game ===
- Winnipeg 3 – London 1

== Individual awards ==
- Most Valuable Player: Alexander Kerfoot (Vancouver)
- Top Scorer: Sam Reinhart (Vancouver)
- Top Forward: Sam Reinhart (Vancouver)
- Top Defenceman: Mike Matheson (Lac St-Louis)
- Top Goaltender: Craig Wood (London)
- Most Sportsmanlike Player: Marcus Power (St. John's)

== Road to the Telus Cup ==
=== Atlantic Region ===
Tournament held March 31–April 3, 2011 at Charlottetown, Prince Edward Island

Round Robin
Pos	Team	Pld	W	L	D	GF	GA	GD	Pts
1	St. John's Privateers	4	4	0	0	20	18	+2	8
2	Halifax Titans	4	3	1	0	16	8	+8	6
3	Fredericton Canadiens	4	1	2	1	16	18	−2	3
4	Charlottetown Islanders (host)	4	1	3	0	7	17	−10	2
5	Cornwall Thunder	4	0	3	1	7	17	−10	1

Championship Game
Halifax 4 – St. John's 3
Halifax advances to Telus Cup

=== Quebec ===
Ligue de Hockey Midget AAA du Quebec Championship

Lions du Lac St-Louis vs Albatros du Collège Notre-Dame

Best-of-7 series played March 29-April 6, 2011

- Game 1: Lac St-Louis 3 – Notre-Dame 2
- Game 2: Lac St-Louis 5 – Notre-Dame 1
- Game 3: Lac St-Louis 9 – Notre-Dame 4
- Game 4: Notre-Dame 3 – Lac St-Louis 1
- Game 5: Lac St-Louis 6 – Notre-Dame 1

Lac St-Louis wins series and advances to Telus Cup

=== Central Region ===
Tournament held March 28-April 2, 2011 at London, Ontario

Round Robin
Pos	Team	Pld	W	L	D	GF	GA	GD	Pts
1	London Jr. Knights (host)	6	5	1	0	28	5	+23	10
2	Mississauga Reps	6	5	1	0	33	16	+17	10
3	Ottawa Jr. 67's	6	4	2	0	22	14	+8	8
4	Nickel City Sons	6	3	3	0	19	25	−6	6
5	Oakville Rangers	6	2	4	0	18	26	−8	4
6	Waterloo Wolves	6	2	4	0	18	16	+2	4
7	Ottawa Senators	6	0	6	0	6	43	−37	0

Semi-finals
Ottawa 67's 5 – Mississauga 3
London 6 – Nickel City 2

Championship Game
London 3 – Ottawa 67's 1
London advances to Telus Cup

=== West Region ===
Tournament held March 31-April 3, 2011 at the Moose Jaw Civic Centre in Moose Jaw, Saskatchewan

Round Robin
Pos	Team	Pld	W	L	D	GF	GA	GD	Pts
1	Winnipeg Thrashers	3	2	0	1	11	8	+3	5
2	Prince Albert Mintos	3	2	1	0	11	7	+4	4
3	Moose Jaw Generals (host)	3	0	1	2	6	7	−1	2
4	Thunder Bay Kings	3	0	2	1	11	17	−6	1

Championship Game
Winnipeg 4 – Prince Albert 1
Winnipeg advances to Telus Cup

=== Pacific Region ===
Vancouver North West Giants vs Red Deer Rebels

Best-of-3 series played April 1–2, 2011

- Game 1: Vancouver 7 – Red Deer 2
- Game 2: Vancouver 3 – Red Deer 1

Vancouver wins series and advances to Telus Cup

== See also ==
- Telus Cup
