= Sam Reinhart =

Canadian ice hockey player (born 1995)

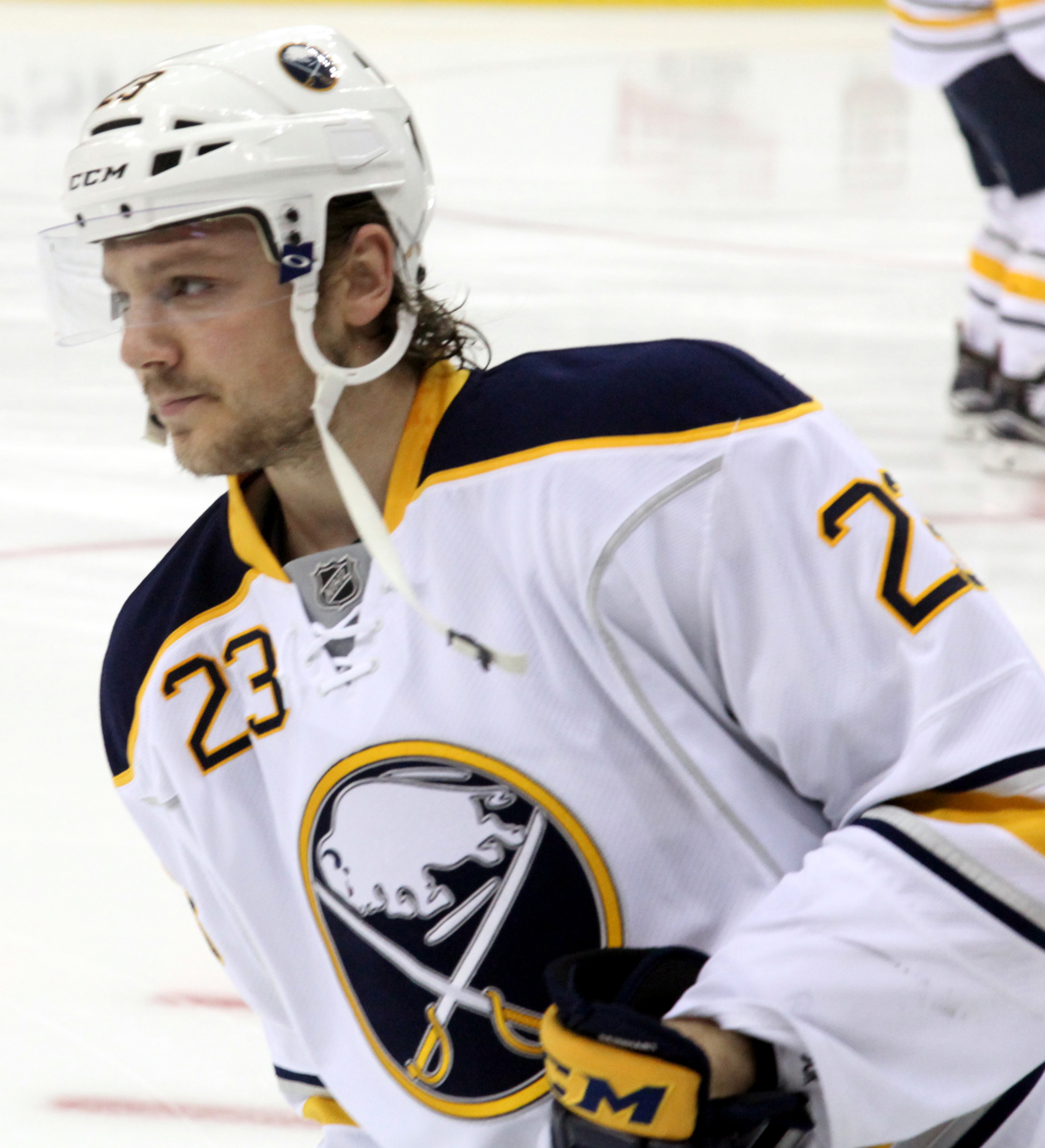
- Reinhart with the Buffalo Sabres in 2016
- Born: November 6, 1995 (age 30) West Vancouver, British Columbia, Canada
- Height: 6 ft 1 in (185 cm)
- Weight: 196 lb (89 kg; 14 st 0 lb)
- Position: Forward
- Shoots: Right
- NHL team Former teams: Florida Panthers; Buffalo Sabres
- National team: Canada
- NHL draft: 2nd overall, 2014; Buffalo Sabres
- Playing career: 2014–present

Samson Reinhart (born November 6, 1995) is a Canadian professional ice hockey player who is a forward for the Florida Panthers of the National Hockey League (NHL). Reinhart was selected second overall by the Buffalo Sabres in the 2014 NHL entry draft.

Reinhart was selected 15th overall by the Kootenay Ice in the 2010 WHL Bantam Draft. Reinhart was a member of the Ed Chynoweth Cup-winning team in the 2010–11 season. He was awarded the Jim Piggott Memorial Trophy in 2011–12, having been the league's top rookie that season. Along with Max and Griffin, he is one of three hockey-playing brothers, and are the sons of former National Hockey League (NHL) All-Star Paul Reinhart. Reinhart was ranked fourth on NHL Central Scouting Bureau's 2014 midterm rankings for North American skaters.

Reinhart won back-to-back Stanley Cups with the Florida Panthers in 2024 and 2025, and scored the Stanley Cup-winning goal in game 7 of the 2024 Final.

Reinhart has represented Canada at five International Ice Hockey Federation (IIHF) sanctioned events, two at the under-18 level, two at the world junior level, and one at the Ice Hockey World Championships. He won gold in 2016, gold in 2015 and bronze in 2012 at the under-18 level. Additionally, Reinhart represented Canada Pacific at the 2012 World U-17 Hockey Challenge and Canada at the 2012 Ivan Hlinka Memorial Tournament.

== Early life ==
Reinhart was born in West Vancouver to Theresa and Paul Reinhart. His father was a National Hockey League (NHL) defenceman. Reinhart wore jersey number 23, the same number that his father wore in the NHL, while in Buffalo.

Sam has two brothers – Max and Griffin. Max was selected in the third-round in 2010 NHL entry draft by the Calgary Flames and played in their organization. Sam played alongside Max on the Ice's Ed Chynoweth Cup-championship team in the 2010–11 Western Hockey League (WHL) season as well as the 2011–12 season. Griffin was selected fourth overall in the 2012 draft by the New York Islanders, and has played against Sam's Ice with the Edmonton Oil Kings (winning his own Ed Chynoweth Cup and Memorial Cup championships) in the WHL from 2011–12 to 2013–14.

Growing up in West Vancouver, Reinhart attended Collingwood School. He also played tennis in high school, and still plays the sport in the offseason. Besides ice hockey and tennis, Reinhart played baseball, lacrosse and soccer, and considers himself a huge soccer fan.

== Playing career ==
=== Minor ===
Reinhart played minor ice hockey at the Hollyburn Country Club in West Vancouver. He started out as a defenceman, but eventually ended up as a centre. From there, he went on to play for the Vancouver Northwest Giants of the BC Hockey Major Midget League (BCMML) alongside future NHLer Alexander Kerfoot and future PWHLer Kaleigh Fratkin. In his first and only full season with the Northwest Giants, Reinhart tallied up 38 goals along with 40 assists. With the Northwest Giants, Reinhart won the 2010–11 BCMML championship and finished fourth in the 2011 Telus Cup. In the Telus Cup, he received the Top Scorer and Top Forward awards. Reinhart also participated in the 2011 Canada Winter Games midway through the 2010–11 season, winning gold with the British Columbia U16 team.

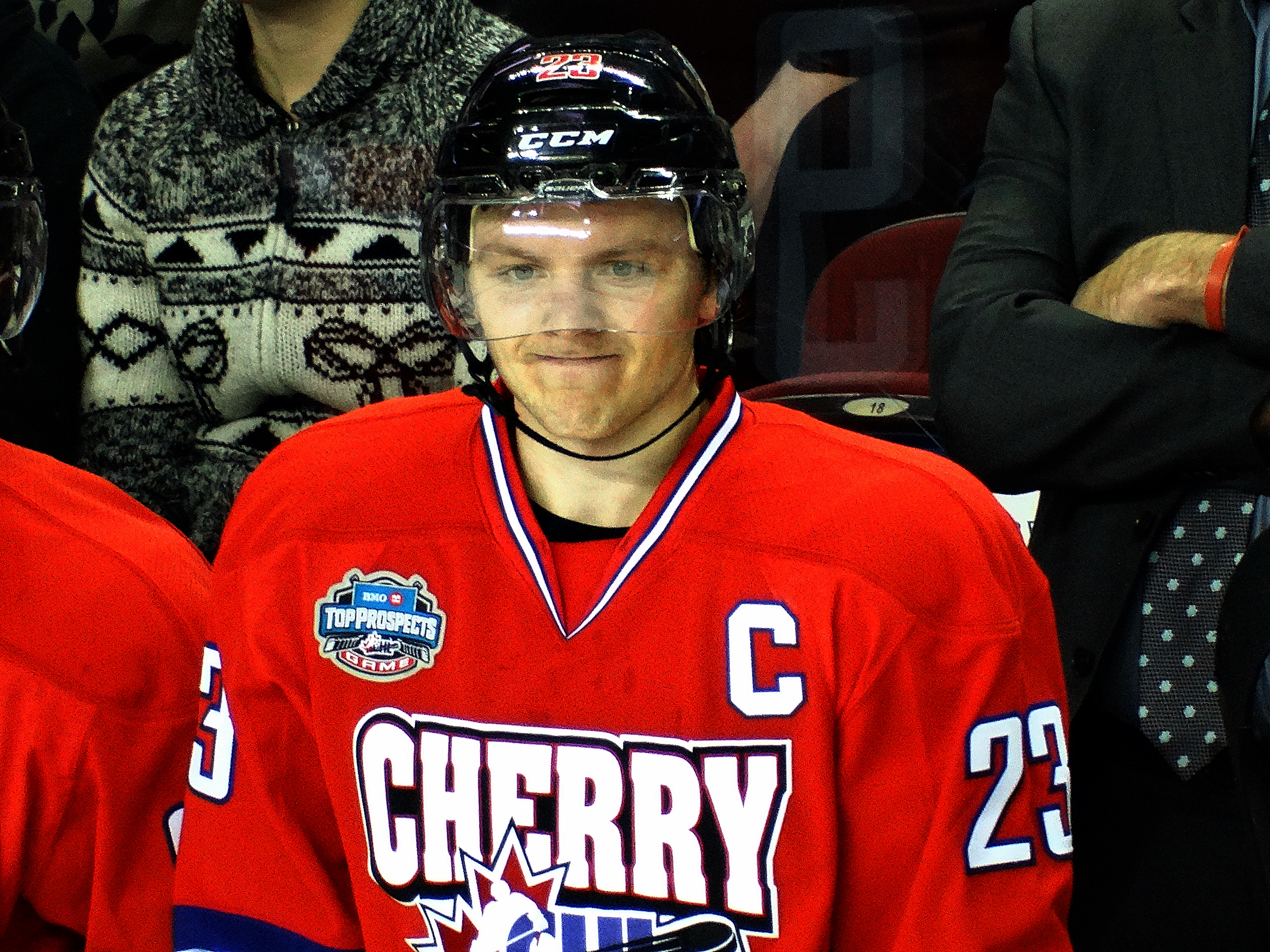
Reinhart at the 2014 CHL/NHL Top Prospects Game.

=== Junior ===
The Kootenay Ice selected Reinhart 15th overall in the 2010 WHL Bantam Draft. He was selected three rounds ahead of oldest brother Max when he was drafted in 2007 and was selected 12 positions behind of Griffin when he was drafted third-overall in 2009. Reinhart joined the Kootenay Ice for four games in the 2010–11 season. In his first WHL game, he scored the game-winning goal against the Edmonton Oil Kings. That was also the first WHL game in which all three Reinhart brothers were playing. Reinhart suited up for seven WHL playoffs games, registering zero points in the process, as part of the Ice's Ed Chynoweth Cup championship team. He played one game for the Ice in the 2011 Memorial Cup.

In the 2011–12, Reinhart registered 62 points, which put him behind only his brother Max in team scoring. His 28 goals tied for the Ice lead, and were the most by any 16-year-old rookie in the WHL, while his 62 points put him fourth among all WHL rookies in that category. Due to his excellent play in his first full season, Reinhart was awarded the Jim Piggott Memorial Trophy as the top rookie in the WHL.

In his second full WHL season, Reinhart was selected to represent the WHL for one game in his hometown Vancouver for the annual 2012 Subway Super Series against Russia; he scored the game-winning shootout goal. Reinhart scored his first hat-trick on January 27, 2012, against the Prince Albert Raiders. He finished his second full WHL season leading the Ice in goals (35), assists (50) and points (85). He was named into the WHL Eastern Conference Second All-Star Team. On April 2, 2013, Reinhart was named captain of the Ice for the 2013-14 WHL season.

On October 9, 2013, Reinhart registered an assist in a game against the Lethbridge Hurricanes, which tied him with John Negrin for the Ice' franchise record for most consecutive games with an assist (8). Reinhart played in the 2013 Subway Super Series for the WHL, and was the captain for the latter of the two games. In his second Subway Super Series, he registered one assist. Reinhart had a goal and an assist in the 2014 CHL/NHL Top Prospects Game while playing as captain for Team Cherry; Team Cherry lost to Team Orr 4–3. Reinhart's father Paul was one of the assistant coaches for Team Cherry.

=== Professional (2014–present) ===
==== Buffalo Sabres (2014–2021) ====
After being selected second overall by the Buffalo Sabres in the 2014 NHL entry draft, Reinhart signed a three-year entry-level contract with the team. After attending the Sabres' training camp, Reinhart made their opening night roster for the 2014–15 season. He made his NHL debut on October 9, 2014, against the Columbus Blue Jackets, becoming the sixth-youngest player to dress for the Sabres in franchise history. Reinhart recorded his first NHL point, an assist on a goal by Nicolas Deslauriers, on October 25 against the San Jose Sharks. This would be his only assist over nine games with the team and he was sent back to the Ice on October 31. Upon being re-assigned to the Ice, Reinhart returned to his scoring form and set numerous franchise records. On January 21, 2015, Reinhart scored a goal against the Saskatoon Blades for a franchise-record 287 career points. Nearly a month later, in his 238th career WHL game, he became the first player in franchise history to record 300 points. He finished the season third on the team in scoring with 19 goals and 46 assists through 47 games. He was assigned to the Sabres' American Hockey League affiliate, the Rochester Americans, on April 9 although his debut was delayed due to an injury. To ease his transition into professional hockey, Americans head coach Chadd Cassidy used him primarily on right wing instead of his natural position of center.

During the 2015 offseason, the Sabres drafted centre Jack Eichel in the first round of the 2015 NHL entry draft and acquired centre Ryan O'Reilly from the Colorado Avalanche. As a result, Reinhart was no longer considered the Sabres top centre and was expected to start the 2015–16 season on the third line. While attending the Sabres' training and development camps, head coach Dan Bylsma stated that Reinhart and Eichel gave the Sabres the best chance of winning games. He was also considered a long-shot candidate for the Calder Memorial Trophy as the NHL's Rookie of the Year. Following the Sabres' training and development camps, Reinhart was named to their opening night roster for the second consecutive season. Reinhart primarily played on the Sabres' third line, but started seeing top line minutes with Eichel as the team began the season with an 8–9–1 record. Reinhart scored his first career NHL goal on October 17, 2015, against the Tampa Bay Lightning on Lightning' goaltender Ben Bishop, and added five more by December 1. On November 27, Reinhart began skating on the Sabres' first line with Ryan O'Reilly and Evander Kane. While they went pointless in their debut, the trio combined for eight goals and 13 points over their next three games. Through six games together in December, Reinhart added four goals and one assist with 19 shots on net. He also earned praise from Bylsma, who said: “his skating has improved. His puck battles have improved. His shot has improved and it's been pretty drastic in the last two months for Sam." On January 10, Reinhart recorded his first career NHL hat-trick in a 4–2 win over the Winnipeg Jets. Reinhart subsequently became the first Sabres player to record a hat-trick since 2006 and the youngest to do so since John Tucker in 1984. The win also ended a season-high six-game losing streak for the Sabres, who were 16–22–4 on the season. At the start of February, Reinhart missed three games with a concussion but scored the Sabres' lone goal in his return as they fell to the Boston Bruins. In the final 18 games of the season, Reinhart left O'Rielly's line and joined Eichel as the Sabres' top unit. After recording a goal and an assist in a win over the Ottawa Senators on March 18, he and Jack Eichel became the first pair of Sabres rookies with 20-goal seasons since 1975. Over the final 18 games of the season, Reinhart and Eichel combined for 12 goals and 17 assists for 29 points. Reinhart finished the season ranked second on the Sabres with 23 goals and 19 assists for 42 points over 79 games. He also received two votes for the Calder Trophy and 10 votes for the Lady Byng Memorial Trophy and the NHL's most gentlemanly player.

During the 2016 offseason, Reinhart worked with his long-time skating coach Barb Aidelbaum on his skating acceleration and playmaking skills to improve for his sophomore season. After Eichel suffered a lower body injury during the preseason, Reinhart began the 2016–17 season on the wing of Ryan O'Reilly and Kyle Okposo. After four games with the two, Reinhart was transitioned to his natural position of centre between Tyler Ennis and Zemgus Girgensons. During his first month in this position, Reinhart experienced a seven-game pointless drought that was snapped with two assists in a game against the Calgary Flames on November 21. However, he continued to experiences bouts of pointlessness and was eventually transitioned back to right wing on a line with O'Rielly and William Carrier. When O'Rielly missed time in December due to an appendectomy, Reinhart was transitioned back to a centre position temporarily. While continuing to alternate between centre and winger, Reinhart maintained a team-high 15 primary assists through early January. He missed two games due to an illness but returned to the Sabres' lineup following their bye-week in late February. Reinhart finished the season with a new-career high 47 points as the Sabres again failed to qualify for the Stanley Cup playoffs.

Reinhart began his third full season with the Sabres and fourth season with the team and in the NHL altogether as a centreman but was reunited with Eichel and Kane on their wing after a slow start. Through his first 17 games of the season, Reinhart had accumulated two goals and three assists while the team maintained a losing 5–9–3 record. This reunion was shortlived as head coach Phil Housley continued to shuffle the forward lines in an effort to create more offense. As Reinhart continued to struggle offensively through the first half of the season, scoring only 11 points in 34 games, Housley tried him back on Eichel's wing again in late December. In the final 38 games of the season, Reinhart accumulated 18 goals and 19 assists for 37 points. On April 1, 2018, Reinhart scored his second career NHL hat-trick in a 7–4 win over the Nashville Predators. The hat-trick helped Reinhart finished the regular season with career-highs in games played, goals, points, power-play goals, and power-play points.

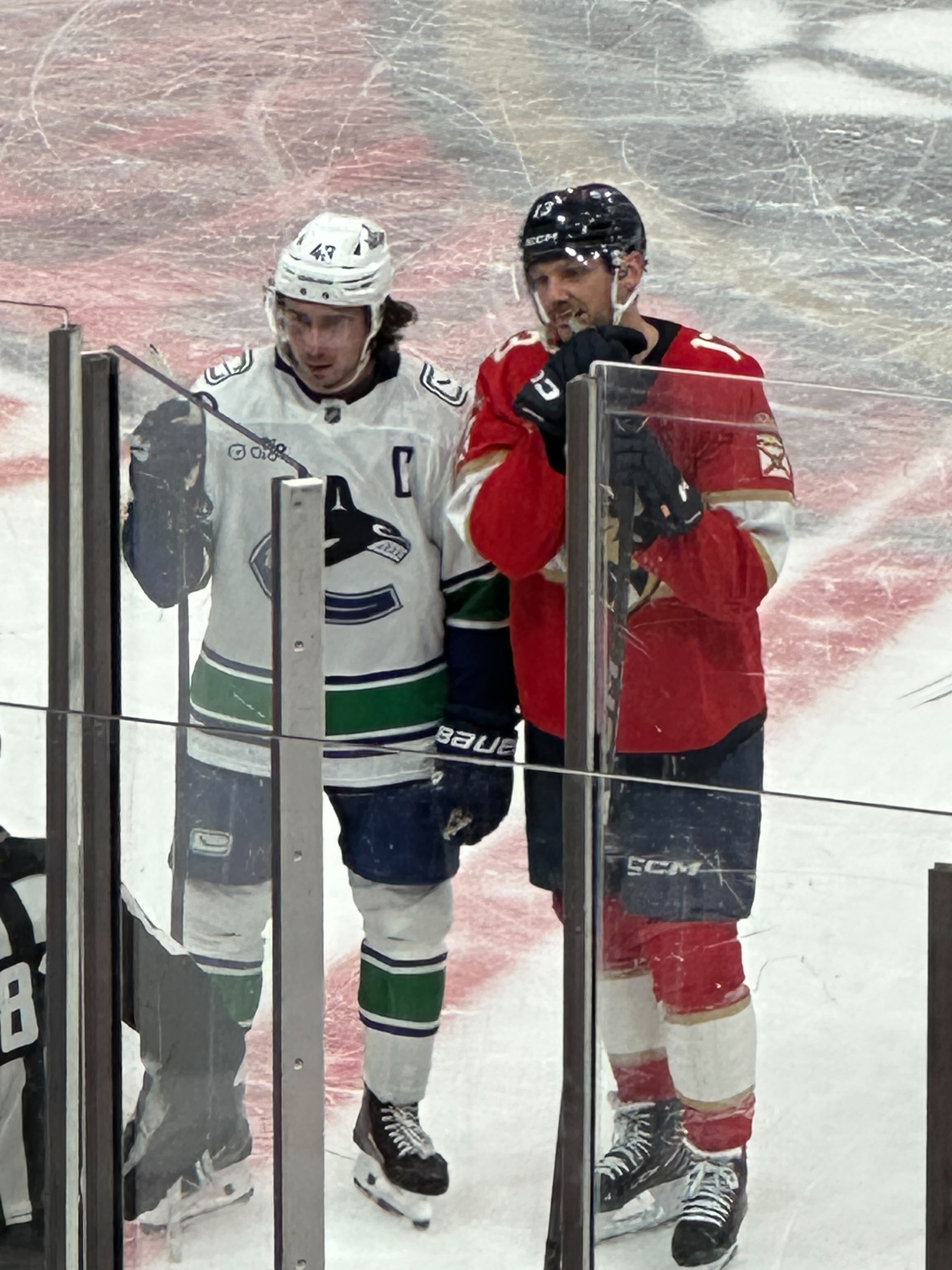
Sam Reinhart stands next to Quinn Hughes during a game against the Vancouver Canucks in November 2025.

On September 19, 2018, Reinhart signed a two-year, $7.3 million contract extension to remain with the Sabres.

On October 25, 2020, Reinhart signed a one-year, $5.2 million contract with the Sabres.

==== Florida Panthers (2021–present) ====
On July 24, 2021, Reinhart was traded by the Sabres to the Florida Panthers in exchange for Devon Levi and a 2022 first-round pick (Jiří Kulich). On August 11, Reinhart signed a three-year, $19.5 million contract with the Panthers.

On June 24, 2024, in game 7 of the 2024 Stanley Cup Final, Reinhart scored the most important goal in franchise history, a decisive goal that put the Panthers ahead 2–1, leading to Florida's first Stanley Cup title.

On July 1, Reinhart signed an eight-year, $69 million contract extension that keeps him with the Panthers through the 2031–32 season. The 2024–25 season, he scored 39 goals, the most of any Panther, and led the team in points with 81 in 79 games. He was named a finalist for the Frank J. Selke Trophy, awarded to the league's best defensive forward. During the 2025 playoffs, Reinhart helped the Panthers repeat as Stanley Cup champions, as they once again defeated the Edmonton Oilers in the Stanley Cup Final. In the Cup-clinching game 6, Reinhart had a memorable game, scoring four goals in the 5–1 Panthers' victory, though Matthew Tkachuk, who scored the only goal for the Panthers other than Reinhart's four, got the Cup-winning goal. This was the first time any NHL player scored four goals in a single Stanley Cup Final series game since Maurice Richard did so in game 1 of the 1957 Stanley Cup Final.

== International play ==
Medal record

Men's ice hockey

Representing Canada

Winter Olympics
Silver medal – second place	2026 Milano Cortina	

World Championships
Gold medal – first place	2016 Russia	
Silver medal – second place	2019 Slovakia	

4 Nations Face-Off
Winner	2025 Canada/United States	

World Junior Championships
Gold medal – first place	2015 Canada	

IIHF World U18 Championship
Gold medal – first place	2013 Russia	
Bronze medal – third place	2012 Czech Republic	

Reinhart competed for Canada Pacific in the 2012 World U-17 Hockey Challenge, but failed to medal. Later that year, he was selected to join Canada's under-18 team for the 2012 IIHF World U18 Championships in the Czech Republic. The team lost to the United States in the semifinals, but won the bronze medal game against Finland in overtime. Reinhart then captained the under-18 team at the 2012 Ivan Hlinka Memorial Tournament as Canada won its fifth consecutive gold medal in the event. Reinhart again captained the U18 team at the 2013 IIHF World U18 Championships in Sochi, Russia. Reinhart scored three goals and four assists to help Canada win the gold, ending the United States' record of four consecutive championships.

Moving up to the under-20 level, Reinhart earned a spot with the national junior team for the 2014 World Junior Championships. His brother Griffin also made the team, and they became the third pair of brothers to play for Canada at the World Junior Championships. Reinhart and Aaron Ekblad were the only two players on the Canadian roster eligible for the 2014 NHL entry draft. Reinhart registered two goals and three assists in the first three games of the tournament, but was held scoreless for the remainder of the tournament. Canada lost the bronze medal game against Russia 2–1 and finished fourth. Sam Reinhart also represented Team Canada at the 2015 World Junior Ice Hockey Championship. The team won gold as Sam served as one of two alternate captains for the team, the other being Connor McDavid. Reinhart scored the game-winning goal against team Russia in the gold medal game, which was his fifth of the tournament. Reinhart finished with a total of 5 goals and 11 points leading all players in goals and points.

Reinhart represented Team Canada at the 2016 IIHF World Championship helping win Gold and finishing the tournament with four assists in 10 games.

On April 29, 2019, Reinhart was named to the Team Canada roster for the 2019 IIHF World Championship held in Slovakia. Reinhart helped Canada progress through to the playoff rounds before losing the final to Finland to finish with the Silver Medal on May 26, 2019. He finished the tournament posting 3 goals and 5 points in 10 games.

On December 31, 2025, he was named to Canada's roster to compete at the 2026 Winter Olympics.

== Personal life ==
In an interview on WGR Sports Radio 550AM, Reinhart stated he prefers to be called "Samson" as opposed to "Sam". Many Panthers fans did not know that Samson was Reinhart's full first name, and had assumed that his given name was "Samuel" until the engraving for the Panthers' 2024 Stanley Cup win. Reinhart's nickname with the Sabres was "Reino", which stuck with his teammates in the Panthers.

As a member of the Florida Panthers, Reinhart stepped up to care for the cat of teammate Anthony Stolarz who left Florida and signed with the Toronto Maple Leafs.

== Career statistics ==
=== Regular season and playoffs ===
			Regular season					Playoffs
Season	Team	League	GP	G	A	Pts	PIM	GP	G	A	Pts	PIM
2010–11	Kootenay Ice	WHL	4	2	0	2	0	7	0	0	0	0
2011–12	Kootenay Ice	WHL	67	28	34	62	2	4	1	1	2	0
2012–13	Kootenay Ice	WHL	72	35	50	85	22	5	0	1	1	4
2013–14	Kootenay Ice	WHL	60	36	69	105	11	13	6	17	23	2
2014–15	Kootenay Ice	WHL	47	19	46	65	20	7	6	3	9	8
2014–15	Buffalo Sabres	NHL	9	0	1	1	2	—	—	—	—	—
2014–15	Rochester Americans	AHL	3	0	3	3	0	—	—	—	—	—
2015–16	Buffalo Sabres	NHL	79	23	19	42	8	—	—	—	—	—
2016–17	Buffalo Sabres	NHL	79	17	30	47	8	—	—	—	—	—
2017–18	Buffalo Sabres	NHL	82	25	25	50	26	—	—	—	—	—
2018–19	Buffalo Sabres	NHL	82	22	43	65	16	—	—	—	—	—
2019–20	Buffalo Sabres	NHL	69	22	28	50	20	—	—	—	—	—
2020–21	Buffalo Sabres	NHL	54	25	15	40	10	—	—	—	—	—
2021–22	Florida Panthers	NHL	78	33	49	82	13	10	3	1	4	2
2022–23	Florida Panthers	NHL	82	31	36	67	12	21	8	5	13	12
2023–24	Florida Panthers	NHL	82	57	37	94	31	24	10	6	16	12
2024–25	Florida Panthers	NHL	79	39	42	81	27	21	11	12	23	6
2025–26	Florida Panthers	NHL	64	29	32	61	10	—	—	—	—	—
NHL totals			839	323	357	680	183	76	32	24	56	32

=== International ===
Year	Team	Event	Result	GP	G	A	Pts	PIM
2012	Canada Pacific	U17	5th	5	4	6	10	2
2012	Canada	U18	3rd place, bronze medalist(s)	7	2	4	6	0
2012	Canada	IH18	1st place, gold medalist(s)	5	3	5	8	0
2013	Canada	U18	1st place, gold medalist(s)	7	3	4	7	2
2014	Canada	WJC	4th	7	2	2	4	0
2015	Canada	WJC	1st place, gold medalist(s)	7	5	6	11	6
2016	Canada	WC	1st place, gold medalist(s)	10	0	4	4	0
2019	Canada	WC	2nd place, silver medalist(s)	10	3	2	5	0
2025	Canada	4NF	1st place, gold medalist(s)	4	0	4	4	0
2026	Canada	OG	2nd place, silver medalist(s)	6	1	1	2	0
Junior totals				38	19	27	46	10
Senior totals				30	4	11	15	0

== Awards and honours ==
Award	Year	Ref
Telus Cup
Top Scorer and Top Forward Awards	2011	
Kootenay Ice
Rookie of the Year	2012	
Fan's Choice Player of the Year	2012, 2013	
MVP	2013	
WHL
Jim Piggott Memorial Trophy	2012	
WHL East Second Team All-Star	2013	
WHL East First Team All-Star	2014	
Four Broncos Memorial Trophy	2014	
Brad Hornung Trophy	2014	
NHL
NHL All-Star Game	2024	
Stanley Cup champion	2024, 2025	

== Records ==
- Kootenay Ice franchise record; most consecutive games with an assist – 8 (tied with John Negrin)

Awards and achievements
Preceded by Mathew Dumba	Jim Piggott Memorial Trophy; 2011–12	Succeeded by Seth Jones
Preceded by Nikita Zadorov	Buffalo Sabres first-round draft pick 2014	Succeeded by Jack Eichel
