= Roman Josi =

Swiss ice hockey player (born 1990)

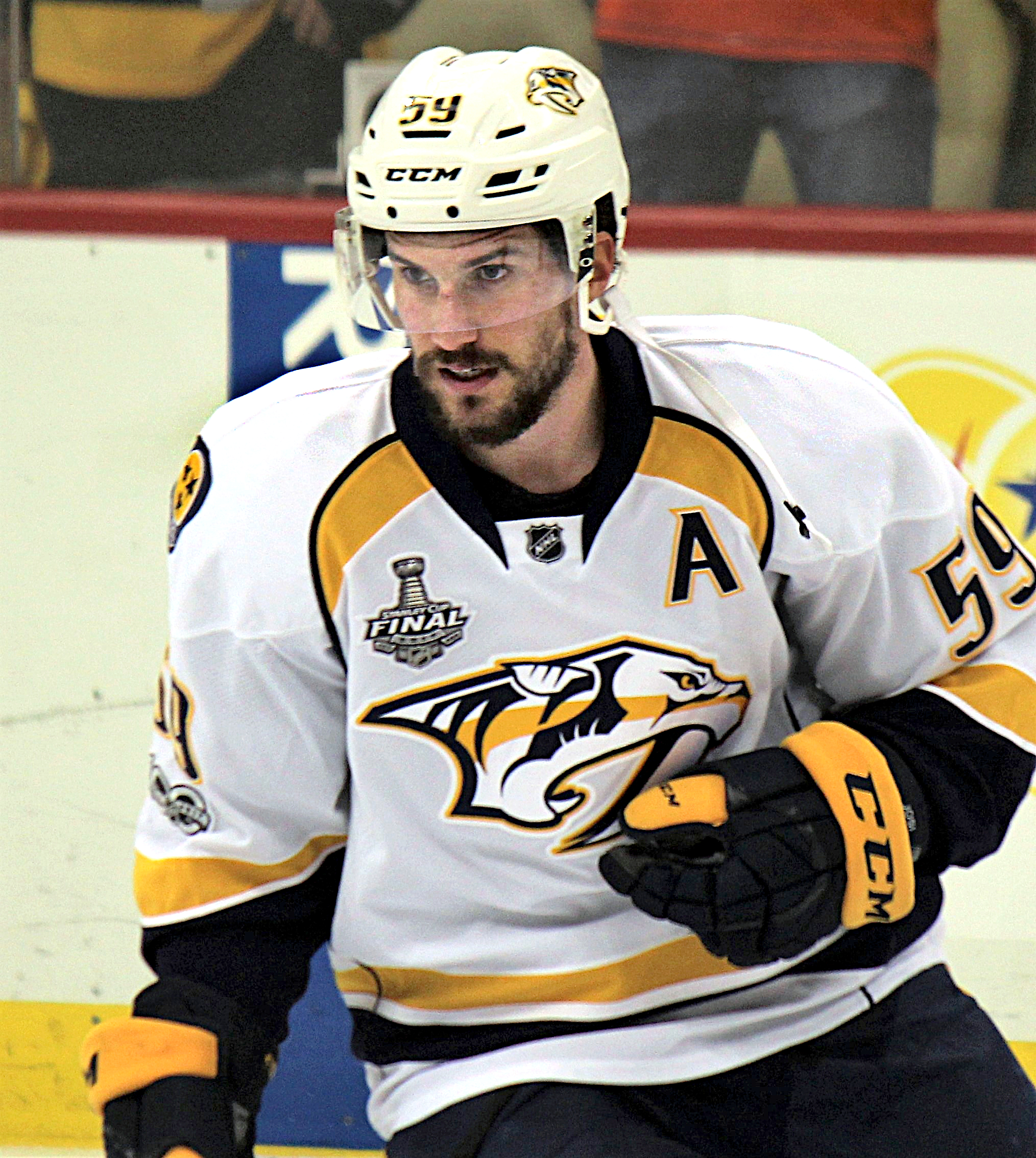
- Josi with the Nashville Predators during the 2017 Stanley Cup Final
- Born: 1 June 1990 (age 36) Bern, Switzerland
- Height: 6 ft 1 in (185 cm)
- Weight: 201 lb (91 kg; 14 st 5 lb)
- Position: Defence
- Shoots: Left
- NHL team Former teams: Nashville Predators; SC Bern
- National team: Switzerland
- NHL draft: 38th overall, 2008; Nashville Predators
- Playing career: 2007–present

Roman Josi (born 1 June 1990) is a Swiss professional ice hockey player who is a defenceman and captain for the Nashville Predators of the National Hockey League (NHL). Josi was drafted 38th overall by the Predators in the 2008 NHL entry draft.

Growing up in Switzerland, Josi played with the local SC Bern from 2006 to 2010. He made his debut with the National League in the 2006–07 season but became a mainstay in the lineup during the 2007–08 season. In 2008, Josi was one of just four 17-year-olds to play in Switzerland's top division. During the 2010 NLA playoffs, Josi led all defencemen and tied for fourth overall in goals as SC Bern won the Championship title.

Following the championship win, Josi joined the Predators' organization for the 2010–11 season. He played his first season with the Predators' American Hockey League affiliate, the Milwaukee Admirals, before becoming a mainstay in the Predators lineup during the 2011–12 NHL season. During his NHL career, Josi has set and broken numerous franchise records. In 2019–20, Josi became the first Swiss player and the first player in Predators' franchise history to win the James Norris Memorial Trophy as the league's best defenceman. In 2021 he surpassed Mark Streit as the highest-scoring Swiss-born NHL player. In March 2023, Josi became the second-fastest active defenceman to reach 600 points in his NHL career. While he reached this milestone in his 823rd game, Josi also set a new franchise record for most 40-assist seasons. Josi subsequently became the second defenceman to lead an active NHL franchise in points, joining Ray Bourque. He is widely considered one of the best defencemen of his generation.

== Early life ==
Roman Josi was born on 1 June 1990, in Bern, Switzerland, the second son of parents Doris and Peter Josi. He grew up in an athletic household as his mother is a former national team swimmer and his father played competitive soccer. Josi played both soccer and hockey as a youth before committing to ice hockey at the age of 10. Both his father and older brother are also involved in ice hockey; Yannic competed with HC Bern Altstadt in SwissDiv3 and Peter serves on the board of directors for SC Bern. He is a supporter of his hometown football club, BSC Young Boys.

== Playing career ==
=== Early career ===
Growing up in Switzerland, Josi played with the local SC Bern from 2006 to 2010. He made his debut with the National League in the 2006–07 season but became a mainstay in the lineup during the 2007–08 season. In his first year of draft eligibility, Josi tallied eight points in 35 games while also representing Switzerland at two international tournaments. Leading up to the 2008 NHL entry draft, Josi was considered one of the top defencemen in the draft. He was eventually selected by the Nashville Predators in the second round, 38th overall. Following the draft, Josi returned to the Swiss league where he led all Swiss League junior players in points, goals, and assists. He was also one of just four 17-year-olds to play in Switzerland's top division. Despite being sidelined for almost four weeks during the 2009–10 season, Josi accumulated 20 points through 24 games by the end of December 2009. He eventually finished the season ranked second among Swiss blueliners in points per game despite being limited to only 26 contests. During the 2010 NLA playoffs, Josi led all defencemen and tied for fourth overall in goals as SC Bern won the Championship title.

=== Nashville Predators ===
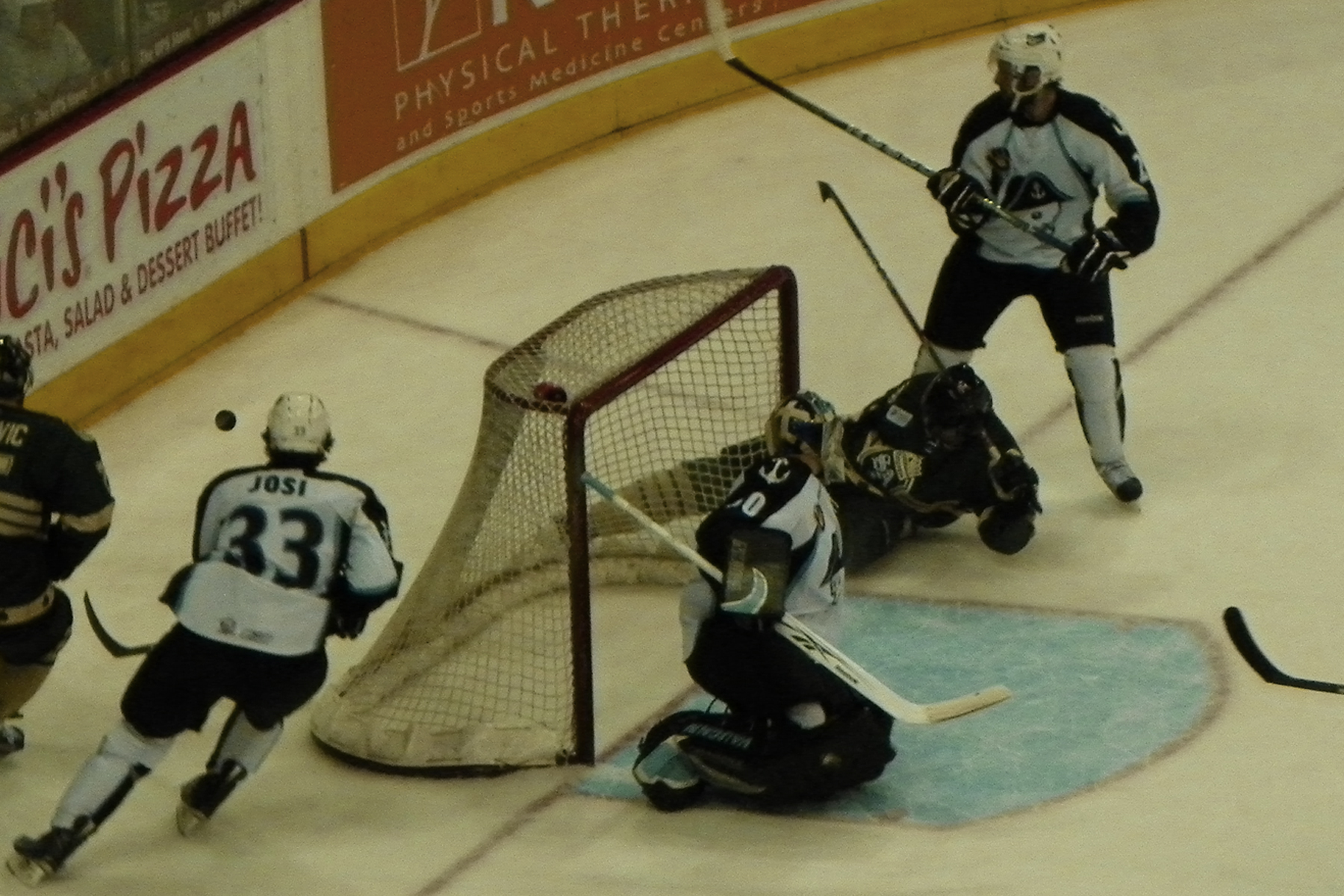
Josi (left) with the Milwaukee Admirals in March 2011

Josi joined the Predators' organization for the 2010–11 season after he signed a three-year entry-level contract on 28 May 2010. He participated in their rookie and training camps before being assigned to their American Hockey League (AHL) affiliate, the Milwaukee Admirals, for the remainder of the season. Although he missed the first seven games of the season, Josi helped the team improve to a 5–0–0–1 record by scoring his first career AHL goal in a 3–2 win over the Lake Erie Monsters in early November. He recorded 14 points in his first 35 AHL games before breaking out and maintaining a 13-game scoring streak from 20 January to 20 February. His point streak was the longest by an Admiral player since Mike Santorelli maintained a 14-game streak in 2008. By 26 February, Josi had collected 12 points in 11 games during February and ranked among the top 15 in AHL rookie scoring. Josi was subsequently a nominee for the Reebok/AHL Rookie of the Month for February, which he lost to Brandon Kozun. As the Admirals qualified for the 2011 Calder Cup playoffs, Josi finished the regular season with six goals and 34 assists for 30 points through 69 games. During the Admirals West Division semifinal matchup against the Texas Stars, Josi recorded an assist in each of his first four postseason games.

==== 2011–2017: Early career and run to the Stanley Cup Final ====
Josi once again participated in the Predators training camp before being placed on injured reserve with the expectation he would report to the Admirals once recovered for the 2011–12 season. Once healthy, Josi tallied four points in his first five games before being recalled to the NHL level on 25 November 2011. He subsequently played 12:20 minutes of ice time in his debut the following day against the Detroit Red Wings. He later scored his first career NHL goal on 10 December to lift the team 3–2 over the Anaheim Ducks. Josi played 12:45 minutes of ice time during the game, including time on the power play, and recorded one blocked shot and one hit. After star defenceman and captain Shea Weber suffered an injury, Josi saw his ice time spike to an average of 23:43 for four games during his absence. Once Weber returned, Josi and fellow rookie defenceman Ryan Ellis were put on the second power-play unit and Josi saw his ice time average out to 20 minutes per game. While playing alongside new teammate Hal Gill, Josi began to play more offensively and began tallying points. He maintained a three-game point streak in February after going pointless for 14 games. Within Gill's first nine games with the team, Josi produced two goals, five points, and +7 plus/minus rating. The two were praised by teammate Ryan Suter who said: "We're [the forwards] not playing as much as we did before we got Hal (Gill). All of our defensemen are really stepping up right now." This was shortlived, however, as Josi missed nine games with an upper-body injury. In his return on 30 March, he played an important role for Nashville's first three goals scored and he recorded a team-high four shots on goal. Josi helped the Predators finish the season with a 4–1–0 record as they qualified for the 2012 playoffs as the fourth seed in the West. Josi made his playoff debut on 11 April in the first game of the opening round of the 2012 playoffs against the Detroit Red Wings. The Predators would defeat the fifth-seeded Red Wings in five games before being defeated in the second round in five games by the third-seeded Phoenix Coyotes. Josi finished his first playoff playing in all 10 games and being held pointless.

Following his rookie season, Josi returned to his youth team, SC Bern, because of the 2012 NHL lockout. He played alongside NHL stars John Tavares and Mark Streit, both of the New York Islanders. When the lockout was resolved in January 2013, Josi returned to the Predators for training camp. He quickly improved on his rookie seasons point totals and set new career-highs in goals, assists, points, and games played. After the Predators lost Ryan Suter, Josi stepped into a bigger role on the ice alongside Shea Weber. While playing alongside Weber, Josi tallied four goals and 10 assists for 14 points through 31 games. He eventually finished the season with five goals and 13 assists for 18 points through all 48 games as the Predators failed to qualify for the playoffs for the first time since 2009.

On 10 June 2013, Josi signed a seven-year, $28 million contract to remain with the Predators through 2019–20. In the first year of his new contract, Josi continued to improve and had another career-best season. He completely replaced Suter on the Predators' top defencemen pairing with Weber and averaged nearly 26:30 minutes of ice time per game. Despite his success, Josi began the season with a concussion after playing in two games. He subsequently missed 10 games to recover. Upon returning, he had a minus rating in five of his first six games before he slowly began improving. By early December, Josi had accumulated 30 blocked shots through 18 games. Later that month, he also tied his career-high five-game point streak. By 14 January, Josi had tallied four goals and 10 assists and ranked sixth in the NHL in minutes played. During a game later that month against the Calgary Flames, he became the second defenceman in franchise history to tally two shootout goals in a season. Upon returning from the Olympics, Josi continued to produce and tied with Patric Hörnqvist for second on the team with 21 assists by mid-March. Josi finished the 2013-14 season with 13 goals and 40 points through 72 games as the Predators failed to qualify for the playoffs for the second straight season.

While playing alongside Weber during the 2014–15 season, Josi scored 15 goals, 40 assists, and 55 points, one shy of the Predators' single-season scoring record for defencemen set by Weber the year prior in 2013-14. While playing on the Predators' top defensive pair with Weber, Josi ranked fifth in the League in average time on ice per game through the first 11 games. Later, in November, Josi helped the Predators tie their franchise record for most goals in a single game. He tallied a goal in the third period to lift the Predators to a 9–2 win over the Toronto Maple Leafs. By 16 December, Josi ranked second on the team with 15 points while leading team defenceman in assists. He also led the team in blocked shots and ranked fifth in the League in average time on ice. Through the first two weeks of January, Josi tallied three game-winning goals in a row and also recorded his 100th and 101st career points. By the end of January, Josi and Weber ranked among the league's top 15 defencemen in points. He had accumulated nine goals and 24 assists for 33 points while Weber had 34 points. Josi also ranked fifth amongst all NHL skaters in time on ice with 26:22 minutes per game. By March, Josi and Weber combined for 89 points, the most of any defensive duo in the NHL. His play helped the Predators qualify for the 2015 playoffs after the team failed to qualify during the previous two seasons. Josi finished the 2014–15 regular season with 15 goals and 40 assists for 55 points. He also recorded 209 blocked shots, the second most of any NHL player in the 2014–15 season. During the Predators first-round matchup against the eventual Stanley Cup champion Chicago Blackhawks, Josi set and tied numerous franchise records. In game two of the series, he scored his first career playoff goal on Blackhawks' goaltender Corey Crawford as the Predators won the game 6–2 to even the series even at 1 apiece. Going into his record-breaking marks, in game four, he played a franchise-record 45:06 minutes of ice time in their triple-overtime loss and tied the franchise record for most playoff shots by a blueliner in one game with seven. The Predators were eventually defeated by the Blackhawks in six games and Josi finished the playoffs with one goal and no assists for one point in all six games. At the end of the season, Josi finished in the top five for the James Norris Memorial Trophy vote.

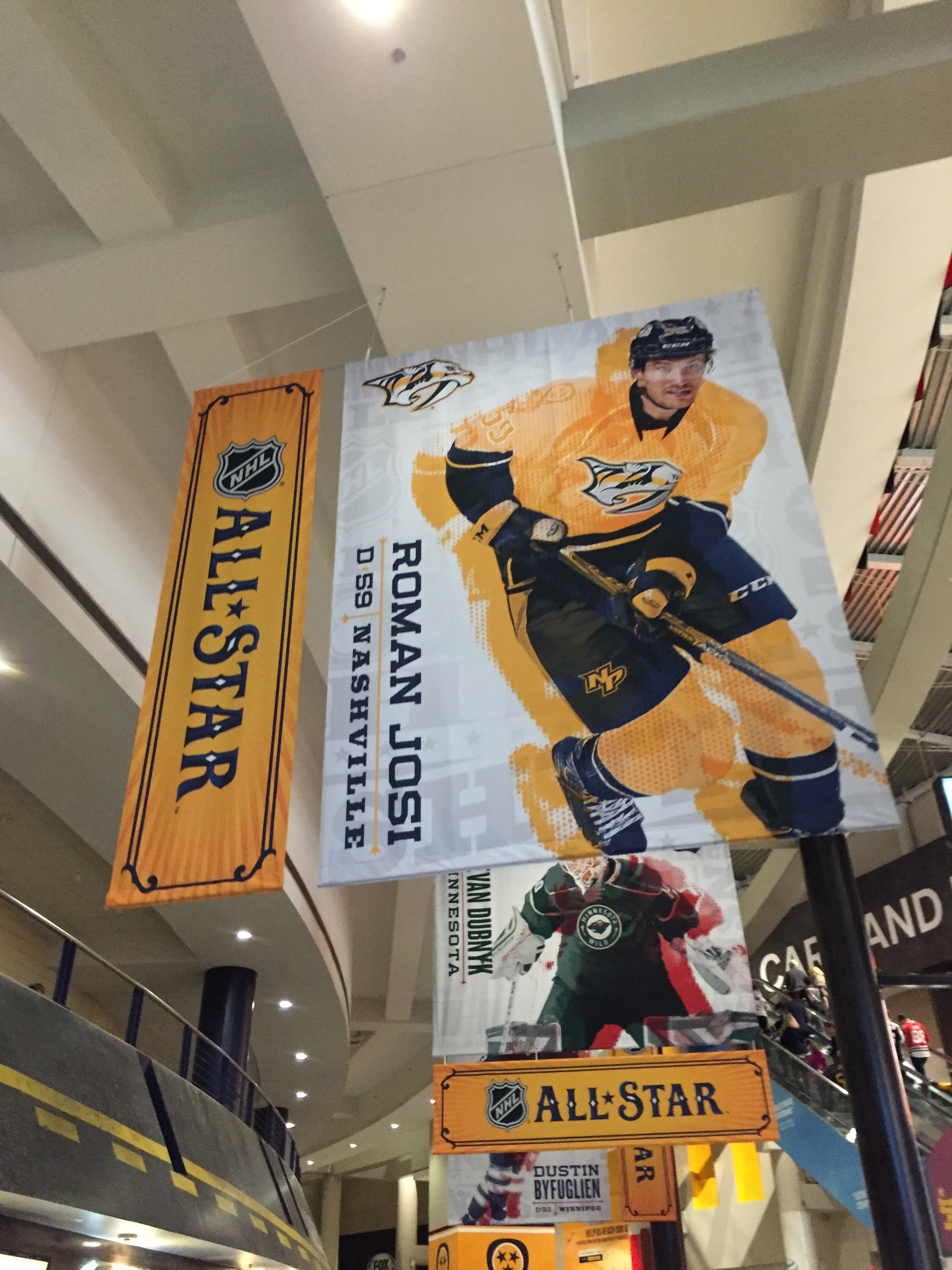
Josi was selected to play in the 2016 NHL All-Star Game

Before the start of the 2015–16 season, Josi was named the third alternate captain for the Predators alongside Mike Fisher and James Neal. The Predators began the season strong, going 3–0–0 in their first three games. In their third game of the season in a 3–1 win over the New Jersey Devils, Josi tallied his first and second goals of the season and set a new franchise record. His second goal was an empty-net, shorthanded, game-winning goal, marking the first time in franchise history that a player scored that trifecta in one goal, and the first time in the NHL since Brian Boyle on 7 March 2015. He later recorded his 100th career NHL assist during the Predators 3–2 win over the Ducks on 17 November. His overall play earned him his first-time selection for the 2016 NHL All-Star Game along with teammates Pekka Rinne, Shea Weber, and James Neal. During the tournament portion, Josi participated in the Fastest Skater competition and finished with a time of 13.527 seconds. By the end of January, Josi led the Predators defencemen with 10 goals and 25 assists for 35 points. Following the NHL All-Star break, the Predators maintained a 14-game point streak from 9 February to 12 March 2016. During that stretch, Josi accumulated one goal and 11 assists. At the end of the month, during a loss to the Colorado Avalanche, Josi set a new franchise record for most points by a defenceman in Predators history. At the time of the record, he had accumulated 13 goals and 44 assists for 57 points, one more than Weber's record-setting 56. He would eventually finish the regular season with 14 goals and 47 assists for a franchise-record 61 points through 81 games. The Predators would eventually qualify for the 2016 playoffs where they faced the Anaheim Ducks in the first round. Josi tallied three points as the Predators eliminated the Ducks in the first game seven of their franchise history to advance to the Western Conference second round against the San Jose Sharks. After the Predators were eliminated by the Sharks, Josi revealed he had been playing through a broken finger and a broken nose. He had sustained the injury to his finger before the playoffs began but he injured his nose during the playoffs. Despite these injuries, Josi finished the playoffs with one goal and eight assists for nine points through 14 games. Josi finished in the top five again for the Norris Trophy vote and was named to the NHL All-Star team.

During the 2016 off-season, the Predators acquired star defenceman P. K. Subban from the Montreal Canadiens in exchange for captain Shea Weber. Subban was expected to replace Weber as Josi's full-time defensive partner. Although they only played one preseason game together, the two were paired together for the Predators season opener. Prior to the start of the 2016–17 season, Josi was selected as a full-time alternate captain along with James Neal. The Predators began the season on a slow start as Josi and Subban began developing chemistry together. The two were paired together for the first four games of the season before moving on to new partners. In these new pairings, the Predators maintained a six-game point streak while both Josi and Subban accumulated eight points apiece through 14 games. Josi recorded five goals and 17 assists through 42 games before being placed on injured reserve on 13 January 2017. He returned to full form in February as he paced all NHL defenceman with 16 points in the month. From 15 March to 8 April, Josi tallied one goal and six assists. He also skated in his 400th career NHL game with the Predators on 27 March as the Predators maintained their 39–25–11 record. He finished the 2016–17 regular season with 12 goals and 37 assists for 49 points as the eighth-seeded Predators faced the top-seeded Chicago Blackhawks in the first round of the 2017 playoffs ending with the Predators upsetting the Blackhawks in a four game sweep. Josi's defensive skill played a crucial role in the 2017 Stanley Cup playoff run that eventually saw the Predators defeat the third-seeded St. Louis Blues in the second round in six games and the second-seeded Anaheim Ducks in the conference finals in six games to go all the way to the 2017 Stanley Cup Final where they would lose in six games to the second-seeded Pittsburgh Penguins. His six goals set a franchise record for most goals by a defenceman in a single postseason. Josi finished the postseason with six goals, eight assists, and 14 points in all 22 games to rank second among all Nashville skaters.

==== 2017–present: Norris Trophy win, captaincy ====
Before the start of the 2017–18 season, Josi was named the seventh captain in Predators history on 19 September 2017. In his first year as captain, Josi settled with Mattias Ekholm as his main defensive partner for the first half of the season. Josi and Ekholm were the Predators' first defensive pair while Subban and Alexei Emelin comprised the second. Josi missed the first three games of the season due to a lower-body injury but he made an immediate impact with two points in his return on 17 October. Josi later helped the Predators tie a franchise record by scoring a power-play goal in their 11th consecutive home game. Although the streak ended at 11 games, the Predators ended November with a 10–3–1 record to tie for the second-most wins in a single month in franchise history. Once Ryan Ellis returned from injury in January, he was reunited with Josi as the Predators top defence pairing while Ekholm joined Subban. Following his return, the Predators quickly picked up another points streak and subsequently earned a point in eight straight games from 2 to 31 January. On 20 February, Josi recorded his 200th career assist to place fifth on the franchise's all time list. Later that month, he also tied the franchise record for most assists and points in a single game with five against the Winnipeg Jets. As the Predators made a push for the 2018 playoffs, Josi, Craig Smith, Scott Hartnell, and Yannick Weber were made healthy scratches for maintenance purposes. It was later revealed that Josi was scratched because he had suffered an upper-body injury. He subsequently missed four games to recover before returning on 11 March to help the team continue their 10-game point streak. A few games later, the Predators hit 100 points in a season for the sixth time in franchise history. On 5 April, Josi and the Predators clinched their first Central Division title in franchise history and won the Presidents' Trophy as the team with the most points during the NHL regular season. Josi finished the 2017–18 season with 14 goals and 39 assists for 53 points in 75 contests to rank second among Predators defencemen behind Subban. The two defencemen also finished in the top seven in Norris Trophy voting. Josi also had an NHL career-high plus-24 rating and led the Predators in shots on goal, blocked shots, and average ice time per game. Despite his regular-season success, Josi was held without a goal through 13 playoff games as the Predators defeated the eighth-seeded Colorado Avalanche in six games in the first round before they fell to the third-seeded Winnipeg Jets in game seven of the second round.

Before the start of the 2018–19 season, Josi was ranked among the top 10 NHL defencemen by NHL Network's hockey pundits. He began the season strong, maintaining a five-game point streak through 12 November. While the Predators began suffering injuries in December, Josi ranked second on the team with five goals and 18 assists for 23 points. By January, Josi had tallied 18 points through 23 games and ranked second on the team and first among team defencemen in points with 29. He was subsequently named to his second NHL All-Star Game alongside Pekka Rinne. Leading up to the All-Star Game, Josi ranked 10th in the NHL among defencemen with 36 points and third in assists per 60 at 1.28, behind Tyson Barrie. Josi continued to rank second behind centre Ryan Johansen on the Predators through February with 14 goals and 37 assists for 51 points through 67 games. The Predators won the Central Division for the second consecutive season and the second seed in the West, resulting in them facing off against the Dallas Stars in the Western Conference first round of the 2019 playoffs. Josi tallied two goals and two assists for four points as the seventh-seeded Stars eliminated the Predators in six games.

Josi signed an eight-year, $72.4 million contract extension with the Predators on 29 October during the 2019–20 season. The lengthy contract also came with a no-movement clause. He spent most of the 2019–20 season playing alongside Ryan Ellis and the two were consistently ranked among the best defensive duo in the league. The duo began the season on a productive note, becoming the first defencemen teammates to each post 13 points within a first 11 games since 1992-93. Josi was named the NHL's Second Star of the Week for the week ending on 27 October after he recorded six points through three games. The Predators began struggling in November and they accumulated a 1–6–1 record through eight games in the month. During their eighth loss, a 7–2 blowout by the Chicago Blackhawks on 16 November, Josi tallied his 100th career NHL goal. Despite his teams' struggles, Josi was an early favourite to win the James Norris Memorial Trophy as the league's best defenceman. The Predators improved their record in December as Josi set a career-high four-game goal streak and recorded his fourth multi-goal games this season, the most among NHL defencemen. His efforts were later recognized by the NHL with his second Second Star of the Week honour for the week ending on 22 December. Josi extended his goal streak to five games before it was snapped in a loss to the Pittsburgh Penguins on 27 December. By the end of December, Josi had maintained a career-high seven-game point streak and tallied a defencemen-leading 14 goals and 39 assists. As such, he was named to the 2020 NHL All-Star Game, his third career All-Star Game. During the Predators 2020 NHL Winter Classic, Josi extend his career-high point streak to eight games and became the first defenceman in franchise history to reach the 40-point mark in fewer than 40 games. After tallying two points the following game, Josi set a new franchise record for points by a player through the first 40 games of the season. He then set another record on 5 January for longest point streak by a defenceman in Predators history, surpassing Shea Weber. Although Josi was experiencing success, the Predators were struggling to win games and had fallen to 11th in the conference standings by 7 January. As such, the team fired their head coach Peter Laviolette and replaced him with former New Jersey Devils coach John Hynes. Under the new coach, Josi extended his point streak to 12 games, during which he accumulated seven goals and 13 assists for 20 points. By the end of January, Josi became the second NHL defenceman to reach the 50-point mark as he had accumulated 14 goals and 37 assists for 51 points. During a game against the Dallas Stars on 7 March, Josi was assessed a minor penalty for high-sticking Stars' winger Corey Perry and later fined $5,000 by the NHL's Department of Player Safety. Before the NHL paused play due to the COVID-19 pandemic, Josi recorded his 48th assist of the season to set a new career high. At the time of the pause, Josi was second in scoring among defencemen with 16 goals and 49 assists for 65 points through 69 games. He was also second among defencemen in even-strength points and fifth in power-play points. Josi also became the eighth defenceman in NHL history to lead a team in scoring at the end of a season with at least 15 points over the next-closest skater. Once the NHL resumed play, Josi and the Predators faced off against the Arizona Coyotes in the 2020 Stanley Cup Qualifiers in the expanded 2020 playoffs. Although the season was shortened due to the COVID-19 pandemic, Josi set new career highs in goals, assists, and points and became the first Predators player and Swiss to win the James Norris Memorial Trophy.

Following his Norris Trophy win, Predators head coach John Hynes announced his plans to cut down on Josi's penalty-killing minutes in order to conserve his energy. Josi and defensive partner Ellis were also recognized on the NHL Network's list of the top 20 NHL defencemen. Once the shortened 2020–21 season began, the Predators had to postpone their first two games due to an outbreak of the coronavirus. Besides these delays, Josi also began the season on a slow start by tallying one goal and one assist through his first six games. He slowly began accumulating points and added one goal and five assists for eight total points by 20 February. He continued to produce before suffering an upper-body injury in early March. At the time of the injury, Josi ranked second on the team with two goals and 14 assists for 16 points through 25 games. Josi missed seven games to recover before returning for the Predators 2–0 win against the Detroit Red Wings on 23 March. Following a 3–0 shutout of the Blackhawks on 3 April, Josi passed Mark Streit to become the highest-scoring Swiss-born NHL player with 435 points. Josi finished the pandemic-shortened 2020–21 season season with a team-leading eight goals and 25 assists for 33 points in 48 games. As the Predators qualified for the 2021 playoffs, Josi and the team met with the Carolina Hurricanes in the first round. Josi tallied four points over six games as the Predators fell to the Hurricanes.

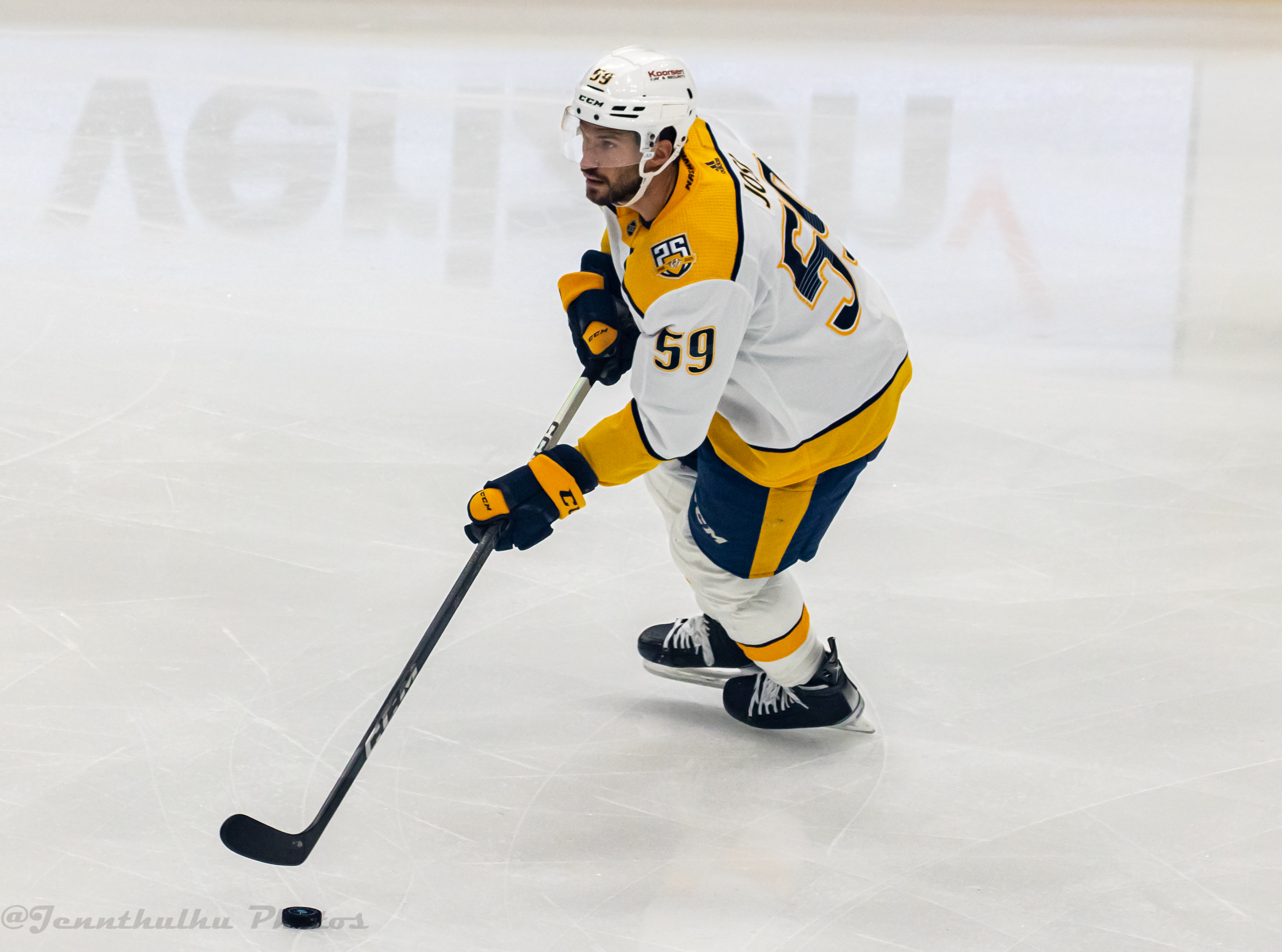
Josi in November 2023

Josi bounced back in 2021–22 and set numerous personal and franchise records. His record-setting began early in the season after he tallied four points in a game against the Arizona Coyotes on 13 November 2021. This marked the first time in his career that Josi had tallied two four-point games in a season. Later that month, he tallied two assists in his 700th NHL game as the Predators defeated the New Jersey Devils 4–2. Josi became the fourth player in franchise history to hit the 700 games played mark, behind David Legwand, Shea Weber, and Martin Erat. By the quarter-point mark of the regular season, Josi ranked fifth in points among all league defencemen and third in goals through 23 games. As such, he was considered an early candidate for the Norris Trophy alongside Adam Fox of the New York Rangers and Aaron Ekblad of the Florida Panthers. Josi had an extremely productive month of January where he set numerous franchise and personal records. Early into the month, he passed Martin Erat for the second-most points in Predators history with his 483rd career points. Later, he also broke his previous record for fewest games by a defenceman to reach 40 points by tallying his 40th point in 38 games. On 20 January, Josi tallied his 357th assist to move into sole possession of the Predators franchise record for assists by a single player. After tallying another assist in the 5–2 win over the Winnipeg Jets, Josi also became the eighth active defenceman to record his 114th career multi-point game. After the month, Josi led the team and ranked fourth among all NHL defencemen in points with 43. As a result of his accomplishments, Josi was named to his fourth career NHL All-Star Game. Upon returning from the NHL All-Star Game, Josi continued his record-breaking season. On 19 March 2022, Josi became the second defenceman in NHL history to score at least three points in four straight games. His numerous multi-point games helped him lead all defencemen with 17 goals and 58 assists through 60 games on pace for a 100-point season. As a result of his accomplishments, Josi earned his first NHL First Star of the Week honour for the week ending 20 March. Josi later earned his first NHL First Star of the Month honour as he finished the month of March with 24 assists and 28 points through 14 games. He thus became the first defenceman to earn this honour since John Carlson of the Washington Capitals in October 2019. Josi continued his momentum into April where he continued to set franchise records. On 7 April 2022, Josi recorded three assists while scoring his 87th point, breaking Paul Kariya's previous record to become the Predators' single-season points leader. During the game, he also tallied three points for the 12th night of the season, tying him with Paul Coffey for the most in a single season. His season continued as later that month, he also became the first defenceman since 1994 to record 90 points in a single campaign. Josi finished the regular season leading all NHL defencemen with 96 points (23 goals, 73 assists) through 80 games, the most points in a season by a defenceman since Phil Housley. He also led defencemen in power-play goals with 11 and shots on goal with 281. Outside of the league, Josi was nominated for Best NHL Player at the 2022 ESPY Awards. As a result of his stellar play, Josi helped the Predators narrowly clinch a playoff berth in the 2022 playoffs as the eighth and final seed in the Western Conference. In their first round series against the Colorado Avalanche, Josi tallied one goal and one assist as they were swept by the top-seeded and eventual Stanley Cup champion Avalanche. In recognition of his achievements, Josi was again a finalist for the Norris Trophy (which eventually went to Cale Makar of the Colorado Avalanche, and was for the first time a finalist for the Ted Lindsay Award, awarded to the league's most outstanding player, which was eventually given to Toronto Maple Leafs centre Auston Matthews. He eventually finished second in Norris and Ted Lindsay voting and sixth in voting for the Hart Memorial Trophy.

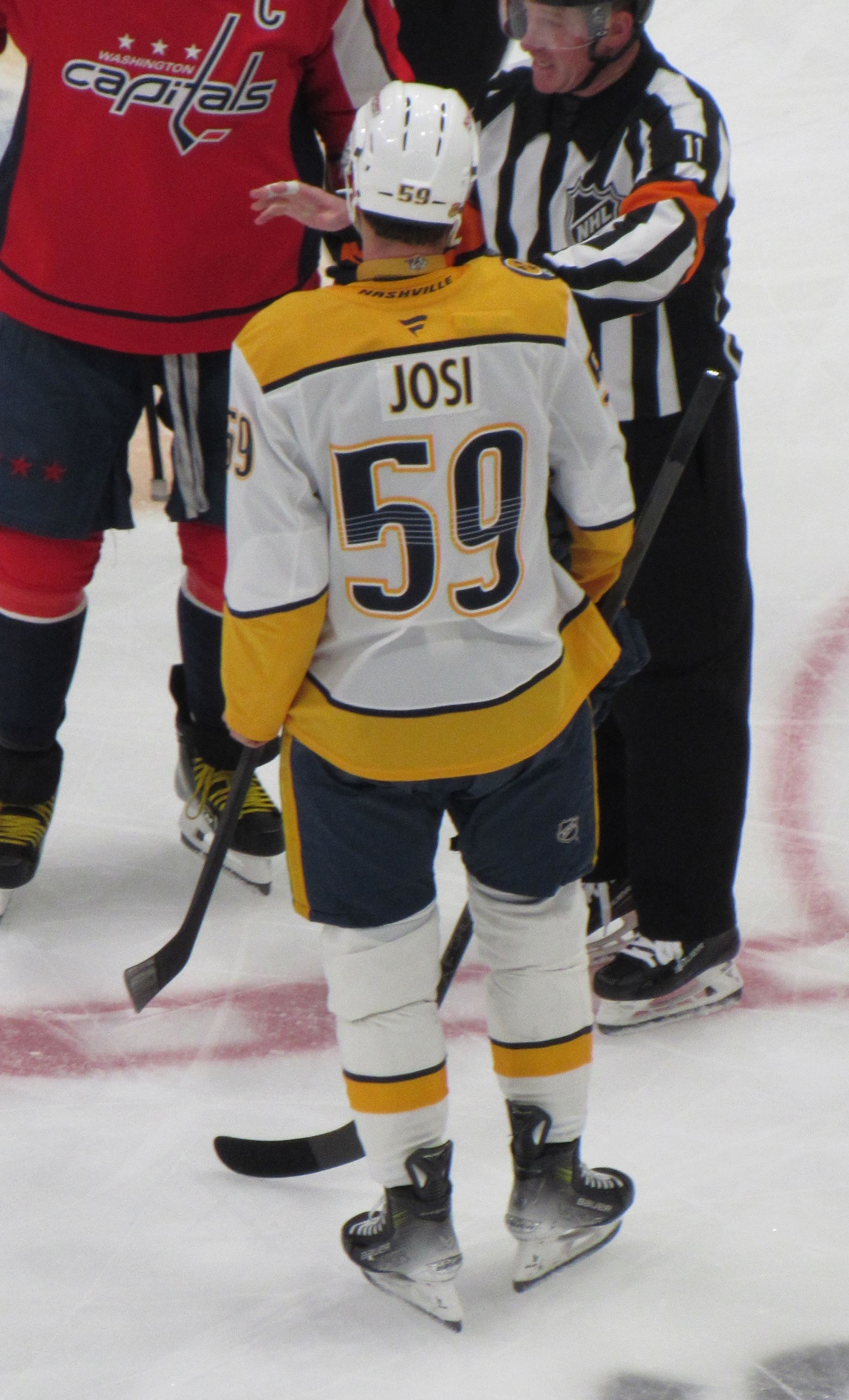
Josi in February 2026

Following the 2021–22 season, Josi returned to the Predators and continued to set franchise records despite failing to match his previous season's points total. He began the 2022–23 preseason playing in his homeland of Switzerland during the 2022 NHL Global Series against the SC Bern. He tallied two goals and an assist to lift the Predators to a 4–3 exhibition win over Bern. Josi struggled to produce points once the season began as he accumulated one assist over his first seven games. He scored his first goal of the season and two assists on 27 October against the St. Louis Blues to help lift the Predators to their 900th franchise win. During the Predators five-game road trip from 1 November to 10 November, Josi averaged a team-high 23:56 of ice time while recording two goals and two assists. By the end of November, Josi was ranked a long shot for the Norris Trophy. Although he began the season on a slow start, Josi would tackle numerous franchise records over the second half of the season. On 13 December, Josi passed Mark Streit to become the longest-playing Swiss-born player in League history. Later that month, on 21 December, Josi recorded his 566th and 567th career points to pass David Legwand for the most in Predators history. His 567 career points were the 27th-most by a defenceman through his first 791 career games in NHL history. In March 2023, Josi became the second-fastest active defenceman to reach 600 points in his NHL career. While he reached this milestone in his 823rd game, Josi also set a new franchise record for most 40-assist seasons. Josi subsequently became the second defenceman to lead an active NHL franchise in points, joining Ray Bourque. While leading the Predators with 59 points over 67 games, Josi suffered an upper body injury in mid-March and was listed as day-to-day. Despite missing the remainder of the 2022–23 season, Josi still maintained the Predators lead with 59 points, followed by Duchene with 56 and Forsberg with 42. In part due to various injuries, the Predators failed to qualify for the 2023 playoffs, marking the first time since 2014 where Josi and the Predators were absent from the playoffs.

In the 2023–24 season, Josi played all 82-game games, finishing first in goals (23) and third in points (85) among defencemen as the Predators returned to the playoffs as the Predators as a team finished seventh in the West and Josi would follow up by playing all six games with a goal and two assists for three points in the Predators first round exit against the Vancouver Canucks. He was voted a Norris Trophy finalist for the third time in his career.

Josi played 53 games of the 2024–25 season. During a game on 25 February, Josi was checked hard into the boards by Florida Panthers forward Sam Bennett and sustained a season-ending concussion. During his recovery, he was diagnosed with postural orthostatic tachycardia syndrome. In a statement announcing Josi's diagnosis, Predators general manager Barry Trotz said he expects Josi to be able to return for the 2025–26 season.

On 22 January 2026, Josi skated in his 1,000th NHL game. He became the first player to reach this career milestone having played all 1,000 games with the Nashville Predators. Josi is the 414th NHL player to play 1,000 games in the league, and the 83rd player to do so all with the same team.

== International play ==
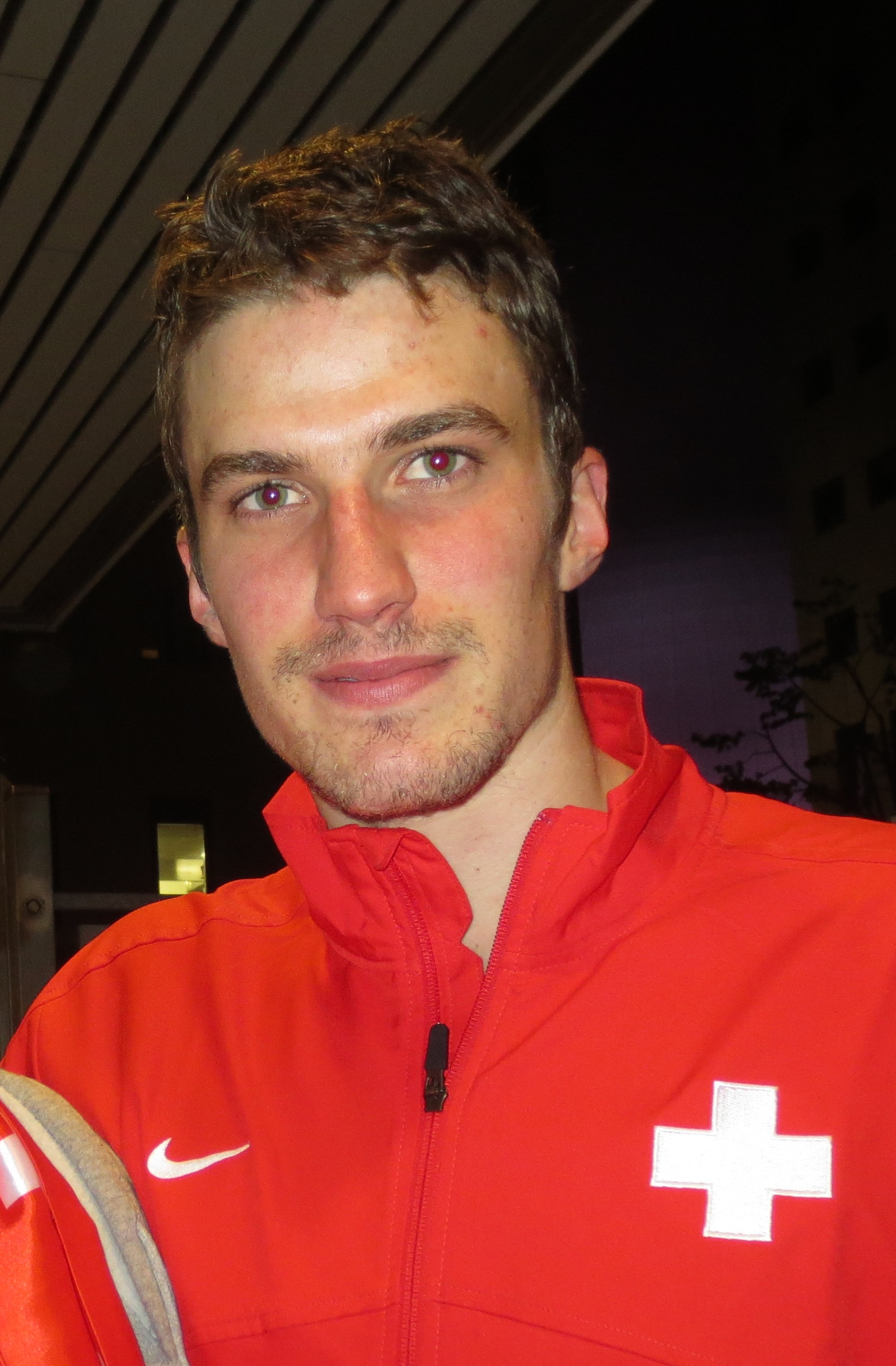
- Josi at the 2013 World Championship

Medal record

Men's ice hockey

Representing Switzerland

World Championships
Silver medal – second place	2013 Sweden/Finland	
Silver medal – second place	2018 Denmark	
Silver medal – second place	2024 Czechia	
Silver medal – second place	2026 Switzerland	

As a native of Switzerland, Josi has represented his home country at both the junior and senior levels in international tournaments. He made his international debut at the age of 16 during the 2007 World Junior Championships. Josi also later participated at the 2007 World U18 Championships for the Switzerland under-18 team. He was again named to the national teams at the 2008 World Junior Championships and 2008 World U18 Championships. During the 2009 World Junior Championships, Josi tallied three goals and five points to lead the Switzerland junior team to a 5–0 record and promotion into the top division for next year's World Junior Championships. For his performance, Josi was named the best defenceman of the tournament. Later, during the 2009 World Championship, Josi tallied no points through six games as the team failed to medal. The following year, Josi joined the Swiss junior team for the 2010 World Junior Championships. In his final junior tournament, Josi tallied one goal and two assists for three points through four games.

After concluding his junior championship tournament, Josi was selected to play for Switzerland senior team at the 2010 Winter Olympics. However, he was unable to make his Olympics debut due to a broken finger he suffered at the World Junior Championships. He eventually made his senior debut for Switzerland at the 2010 World Championship and immediately made an impression on the team. Josi opened the tournament by tallying the game-winning goal for Switzerland in a 3–1 win over Latvia. He also recorded a power-play assist on Switzerland's second goal of an eventual 3–0 shutout over Italy. His three points through three games tied him for the most among tournament defencemen through the preliminary round. Josi again represented the Swiss national team at the 2012 and 2013 World Championships. On 19 May 2013, Josi helped Switzerland reach the final of men's World Championship for only the second time. He finished the tournament with four goals and five assists to earn tournament's most valuable player and become the first Swiss player to be honoured with selection for the World Championship All-Star team. Josi eventually made his Olympics debut during the 2014 Winter Olympics. He went pointless through four games as the Swiss failed to medal.

In 2016, Josi was selected to play for Team Europe in his first World Cup of Hockey. He later won his third silver medal with Switzerland at the 2018 World Championship after the team fell to Sweden in the shootout. He was not as successful during the 2019 World Championship as Switzerland failed to medal.

He represented Switzerland at the 2024 World Championship and won a silver medal.

On 16 June 2025, Josi was named to the Swiss team for the 2026 Winter Olympics.

== Personal life ==
Josi married Ellie Ottaway, a model and musician, on 20 June 2019. They have a son and daughter together.

While the NHL paused play due to the COVID-19 pandemic, Josi became active in support efforts across Tennessee. He helped raise funds to support the Nashville Strong tornado relief efforts and donated $20,000 to the Second Harvest Food Bank of Middle Tennessee. He also donated another $20,000 to Home Street Home Ministries in Nashville.

== Career statistics ==
=== Regular season and playoffs ===
			Regular season					Playoffs
Season	Team	League	GP	G	A	Pts	PIM	GP	G	A	Pts	PIM
2005–06	SC Bern	SUI U20	5	0	0	0	0	—	—	—	—	—
2006–07	SC Bern	SUI U20	33	14	16	30	28	14	1	3	4	2
2006–07	SC Langenthal	SUI-2 U20	1	0	0	0	0	—	—	—	—	—
2006–07	SC Bern	NLA	3	0	1	1	0	—	—	—	—	—
2007–08	Young-Sprinters Hockey Club	NLB	3	2	0	2	4	—	—	—	—	—
2007–08	SC Bern	NLA	35	2	6	8	10	6	0	0	0	0
2007–08	SC Bern	SUI U20	—	—	—	—	—	6	2	2	4	14
2008–09	SC Bern	NLA	42	7	17	24	16	6	0	0	0	0
2008–09	SC Bern	SUI U20	—	—	—	—	—	3	5	4	9	0
2009–10	SC Bern	NLA	26	9	12	21	12	15	6	7	13	8
2010–11	Milwaukee Admirals	AHL	69	6	34	40	22	13	1	6	7	8
2011–12	Nashville Predators	NHL	52	5	11	16	14	10	0	0	0	10
2011–12	Milwaukee Admirals	AHL	5	1	3	4	0	—	—	—	—	—
2012–13	SC Bern	NLA	26	6	11	17	14	—	—	—	—	—
2012–13	Nashville Predators	NHL	48	5	13	18	8	—	—	—	—	—
2013–14	Nashville Predators	NHL	72	13	27	40	18	—	—	—	—	—
2014–15	Nashville Predators	NHL	81	15	40	55	26	6	1	0	1	0
2015–16	Nashville Predators	NHL	81	14	47	61	43	14	1	8	9	12
2016–17	Nashville Predators	NHL	72	12	37	49	18	22	6	8	14	12
2017–18	Nashville Predators	NHL	75	14	39	53	24	13	0	4	4	2
2018–19	Nashville Predators	NHL	82	15	41	56	42	6	2	2	4	4
2019–20	Nashville Predators	NHL	69	16	49	65	22	4	0	4	4	4
2020–21	Nashville Predators	NHL	48	8	25	33	20	6	0	4	4	2
2021–22	Nashville Predators	NHL	80	23	73	96	46	4	1	1	2	0
2022–23	Nashville Predators	NHL	67	18	41	59	36	—	—	—	—	—
2023–24	Nashville Predators	NHL	82	23	62	85	45	6	1	2	3	2
2024–25	Nashville Predators	NHL	53	9	29	38	18	—	—	—	—	—
2025–26	Nashville Predators	NHL	68	13	42	55	30	—	—	—	—	—
NL totals			132	24	47	71	52	27	6	7	13	8
NHL totals			1,030	203	576	779	429	91	12	33	45	48

- All statistics taken from NHL.com

=== International ===
Year	Team	Event	Result	GP	G	A	Pts	PIM
2007	Switzerland	WJC	7th	6	0	0	0	0
2007	Switzerland	U18	6th	6	1	1	2	2
2008	Switzerland	WJC	9th	6	0	1	1	4
2008	Switzerland	U18	8th	6	1	4	5	4
2009	Switzerland	WJC D1	P	5	2	3	5	6
2009	Switzerland	WC	9th	6	0	0	0	2
2010	Switzerland	WJC	4th	4	1	2	3	0
2010	Switzerland	WC	5th	7	1	2	3	0
2012	Switzerland	WC	11th	3	0	1	1	0
2013	Switzerland	WC	2nd place, silver medalist(s)	10	4	5	9	4
2014	Switzerland	OG	9th	4	0	0	0	0
2014	Switzerland	WC	10th	7	1	6	7	2
2015	Switzerland	WC	8th	8	2	2	4	2
2016	Team Europe	WCH	2nd	6	0	0	0	2
2018	Switzerland	WC	2nd place, silver medalist(s)	5	0	3	3	4
2019	Switzerland	WC	8th	8	1	5	6	10
2024	Switzerland	WC	2nd place, silver medalist(s)	10	3	9	12	4
2026	Switzerland	OG	5th	5	2	2	4	0
2026	Switzerland	WC	2nd place, silver medalist(s)	10	5	7	12	6
Junior totals				33	5	11	16	16
Senior totals				89	19	42	61	36

== Awards and achievements ==
Award	Year	Ref
NLA
National League A champion	2010, 2013	
NLA Media Swiss All-Star team	2010	
NHL
NHL All-Star Game	2016, 2019, 2020, 2022	
James Norris Memorial Trophy	2020	
NHL First All-Star team	2020, 2022, 2024	
International
World Championship MVP	2013, 2026	
World Championship Best Defenceman	2013, 2024, 2026	
World Championship All-Star team	2013, 2024, 2026	

=== Records ===
==== Nashville Predators ====
- Most assists (576)
- Most assists in a season (73, 2021–22)
- Most points in a season (96, 2021–22)

Sporting positions
Preceded by Mike Fisher	Nashville Predators captain 2017–present	Incumbent
Awards and achievements
Preceded by Mark Giordano	James Norris Memorial Trophy winner 2020	Succeeded by Adam Fox
