= Chris Rooney =

American ice hockey referee (born 1975)

- Born: May 26, 1975 (age 51); Boston, Massachusetts, U.S.
- Occupation: Ice hockey referee
- Years active: 2000–present
- Employer: National Hockey League

Chris Rooney (born May 26, 1975) is an American ice hockey referee who works in the National Hockey League. He wears uniform number five, and wore number 21 early in his career.

== Career ==
Rooney signed an NHL minor league contract in 1999. His first NHL regular season game was between the Tampa Bay Lightning and Atlanta Thrashers on November 22, 2000. He was promoted to a full time referee in 2002. He worked the 2010 NHL Winter Classic with Kerry Fraser at Fenway Park between Boston Bruins and Philadelphia Flyers. Rooney officiated in the 2012, 2013, 2018, 2019 as well as 2022 Stanley Cup Final.

Rooney was one of eight officials selected to work the 4 Nations Face-Off in February 2025.

He also was selected to work the 2026 Winter Olympics men's ice hockey tournament, refereeing multiple games including the gold medal match between Canada and the United States.
