= Kyle Rehman =

Canadian ice hockey referee (born 1978)

- Born: September 15, 1978 (age 47); Red Deer, Alberta, Canada
- Education: University of Alberta
- Occupation: Ice hockey referee
- Years active: 2008–present
- Employer: National Hockey League

Kyle Rehman (born September 15, 1978) is a Canadian National Hockey League (NHL) referee. He made his debut during the 2007–08 NHL season, and has officiated 1,010 regular season games as of the start of the 2024–25 season. He has also worked 43 Stanley Cup playoff games. Prior to starting his professional career, he was a recipient of the Allen Paradice Memorial Trophy as the Western Hockey League’s top on-ice official.

Rehman wears uniform number 10, he previously wore number 37.

== Early life ==
Kyle Rehman was born September 15, 1978, in Red Deer, Alberta. He played for his hometown Junior B team, and was given an offer to try officiating at the end of his junior hockey career, which he initially declined. He reconsidered after being given a second invitation, and in 2000 he started working local games in minor, junior and senior hockey as both a referee and a linesman.

In 2002, he was hired by the WHL, and was the recipient of the Allen Paradice Memorial Trophy for the 2005–06 season. During this time, Rehman earned an undergraduate degree from the University of Alberta, and worked as a substitute teacher.

== Career ==
Rehman joined the NHL on a minor league officiating contract in 2007. His first NHL game was between the Edmonton Oilers and the Tampa Bay Lightning on January 22, 2008. He worked the game at the St. Pete Times Forum with referee Mick McGeough, and linesmen Jay Sharrers and Vaughan Rody. His made his first playoff appearance ten years later, for game one of the 2018 Eastern Conference first round series between the Toronto Maple Leafs and the Boston Bruins.

Rehman marked his 1,000th NHL game on March 28, 2024, at Rogers Place between the Los Angeles Kings and the Edmonton Oilers. Earlier in the season he worked the 2023 NHL Global Series in Stockholm, Sweden. He also officiated the 2020 Winter Classic.

== Personal life ==
Rehman moved to Phoenix, Arizona in 2015, and had previously lived in Calgary, Alberta. He is married, with three children.

== See also ==
- List of NHL on-ice officials
