= Gord Dwyer =

Canadian ice hockey referee

- Born: 1976 or 1977 (age 49–50); Lower Sackville, Nova Scotia, Canada
- Education: Saint Mary's University
- Occupation: Ice hockey referee
- Years active: 2001–present
- Employer: National Hockey League

Gord Dwyer (born 1976 or 1977) is a Canadian ice hockey referee currently officiating in the National Hockey League. He made his debut during the 2005–06 NHL season, and wears uniform number 19. As of the conclusion of the 2025–26 regular season, he has officiated 1,384 regular-season games.

== Early life and career ==
Gord Dwyer was born and raised in Lower Sackville, Nova Scotia, playing his amateur hockey career in Sackville, until retiring from playing at the age of 20. Dwyer began officiating at the age of 14, reaching elite levels following the conclusion of his playing career, first in junior and university hockey, before being hired by the Quebec Maritimes Junior Hockey League.

== Professional career ==
Dwyer worked as a full-time referee in the Central Hockey League, beginning in 2001–02. After two seasons the CHL, Dwyer was offered a contract by the NHL to referee minor-league hockey beginning with the 2003–04 season. Dwyer made his NHL debut in Edmonton on 19 November 2005, working as a referee in a regular-season game between the Chicago Blackhawks and the Edmonton Oilers. Following the 2005–06 season, Dwyer was promoted to full-time NHL referee status.

Dwyer officiated his first NHL playoff game on 16 April 2014, in Tampa on Game 1 of the Lightning's first-round series against the Montreal Canadiens. As of the 2025 Stanley Cup Final, Dwyer has officiated in three Stanley Cup Final series: 2019, 2021, and 2022.

Dwyer officiated six games at the 2026 Winter Olympics, including the gold-medal game.

== Personal life ==
Dwyer graduated from Saint Mary's University, having studied psychology and criminology. In 2023, he was inducted into the Sackville Sports Heritage Hall of Fame.

== See also ==
- List of NHL on-ice officials
