= Vaughan Rody =

Canadian National Hockey League linesman (born 1968)

Vaughan Rody (born December 13, 1968, in Winnipeg, Manitoba) is a retired Canadian National Hockey League linesman, who wore uniform number #73. Vaughan officiated 1,232 NHL games during his 23-year career in the league, and his highlights include working the IIHF World Junior A Championships, two Heritage Classics, the 2016 NHL All Star game, the Stanley Cup Playoffs and the Memorial Cup. Rody's first NHL game was the St. Louis Blues at the Anaheim Mighty Ducks on October 8, 2000, and his final game was the Colorado Avalanche at the Seattle Kraken on April 20, 2022.
