= Tambellini =

Tambellini is a surname. Notable people with the surname include:

- Adam Tambellini (born 1994), Canadian ice hockey player
- Addie Tambellini (1936–2004), Canadian ice hockey player
- Aldo Tambellini (1930–2020), American artist
- Jeff Tambellini (born 1984), Canadian ice hockey player
- Roger Tambellini (born 1975), American golfer
- Steve Tambellini (born 1958), Canadian ice hockey player and executive
