= Troy Stecher =

Canadian ice hockey player (born 1994)

- Born: April 7, 1994 (age 32) Richmond, British Columbia, Canada
- Height: 5 ft 10 in (178 cm)
- Weight: 184 lb (83 kg; 13 st 2 lb)
- Position: Defence
- Shoots: Right
- NHL team Former teams: Toronto Maple Leafs; Vancouver Canucks; Detroit Red Wings; Los Angeles Kings; Arizona Coyotes; Calgary Flames; Edmonton Oilers
- National team: Canada
- NHL draft: Undrafted
- Playing career: 2016–present

Troy Stecher (/ˈstɛtʃər/ STETCH-ər; born April 7, 1994) is a Canadian professional ice hockey player who is a defenseman for the Toronto Maple Leafs of the National Hockey League (NHL). He previously played for the Vancouver Canucks, Detroit Red Wings, Los Angeles Kings, Arizona Coyotes, Calgary Flames and Edmonton Oilers.

Undrafted into the NHL, Stecher played for the University of North Dakota for three seasons. In his last season, he was honored as a Second-Team All-American West, All-NCHC Second Team, and NCHC Offensive Defenseman of the Year.

== Playing career ==
=== Amateur ===
Stecher began playing hockey at the age of six with the Richmond Minor Hockey Association. After graduating from Alfred B Dixon Elementary, Stecher attended South Delta Secondary School due to their hockey academy while still playing in bantam hockey. Despite being selected in the 2009 WHL Draft by the Portland Winterhawks, Stecher chose instead to play with the Penticton Vees of the BCHL to better develop as a player.

In his second year with the Vees, Stecher was named an Assistant Captain as he helped guide the Vees to the national junior ‘A’ Championship. Although Stecher was loaned to Team Canada West for the 2011 World Junior A Challenge, he still registered a career-high 42 points in 53 games during the regular season. While playing in the RBC Cup, Stecher recorded 10 points in 15 games and was named the Royal Bank Cup's top defenseman.

On June 28, 2012, Stecher was named team captain for the 2012–13 season. It was during this season, his final year with the Penticton Vees, that Stecher committed to playing NCAA hockey for the University of North Dakota. At the conclusion of the 2012–13 season, Stecher was named to the BCHL First-Team All-Star and awarded the Top Defenseman Trophy for the Interior.

=== Collegiate ===
Stecher played three seasons of college hockey with the University of North Dakota.

In his freshman year at North Dakota, Stecher played in all 42 games, the only freshman to do so. He ended the season with 11 points in 42 games.

In his last year of draft eligibility, Stecher was passed over in the 2014 NHL entry draft, the third straight draft he was not selected in. As such, Stecher returned to North Dakota for his sophomore season. During a December game against the Lake Superior State Lakers, Stecher was injured and was expected to miss 6–8 weeks to recover. After missing eight games, Stecher returned for a 3–2 loss against Nebraska Omaha on January 30. He ended the season with 13 points in 34 games.

In his last year at North Dakota, Stecher set a career high with 29 points in 43 games. He was named a Second-Team All-American West at the conclusion of the 2015–16 season and selected for the All-NCHC Second Team. He was also named a finalist for NCHC Defenseman of the Year and NCHC Offensive Defenseman of the Year, winning a national title with North Dakota. Following his outstanding third season, the Vancouver Canucks signed him to a two-year entry-level contract on April 13, 2016.

=== Professional ===
==== Vancouver Canucks ====
Stecher was a late cut from the Canucks' 2016 training camp and was sent to their AHL affiliate, the Utica Comets to start the season. After playing in the Comets' first four games and tallying an assist, he was recalled to the Canucks on October 24, 2016. He made his NHL debut the next day, logging 22:35 minutes of ice time in a 3–0 loss to the Ottawa Senators. As a result, Stecher became the first player born and raised in Richmond, British Columbia to play for the Canucks. His first career assist and point came on a Daniel Sedin goal on November 5 in a 6–3 loss to the Toronto Maple Leafs. In the same game, he was hit by Leafs enforcer Matt Martin in the 3rd period and a line brawl proceeded.

He scored his first NHL goal against Kari Lehtonen on November 13 (tying the game with 1:10 left to force overtime) in a 5–4 overtime victory against the Dallas Stars. On March 26, 2017 he left a game against the Winnipeg Jets with an upper-body injury due to a fall into the boards after a collision with a Jets player. Stecher healed well enough to play on the Friday game.

During the Canucks 2017–18 season opener, Stecher recorded his first NHL fight against Edmonton Oilers forward Ryan Strome. On October 24, 2017 the Canucks announced via Twitter that Stecher would be out 4-to-6 weeks with a knee injury that was caused in a game against the Detroit Red Wings. He returned to the Canucks lineup on November 24, 2017, after missing 14 games. Stecher concluded the regular season with 11 points in 68 games. On July 20, 2018, Stecher signed a two year, $4.65 million deal with the Canucks.

==== Detroit Red Wings ====
After not being tendered a qualifying offer by the Canucks, Stecher became an unrestricted free agent. On October 10, 2020, Stecher signed a two-year, $3.4 million contract with the Detroit Red Wings.

==== Los Angeles Kings ====
On March 20, 2022, in the final year of his contract, Stecher was dealt by Detroit to the Los Angeles Kings in exchange for a 2022 seventh-round draft pick. Stecher tallied 1 assist through the remaining 13 regular season games with the Kings. Drawing into the lineup for the playoffs in a first-round encounter with the Edmonton Oilers, Stecher recorded 2 goals and 4 points in just 4 games.

==== Arizona Coyotes ====
As a free agent from the Kings, Stecher was signed to a one-year, $1.25 million contract with the Arizona Coyotes on July 13, 2022.

==== Calgary Flames ====
On March 3, 2023, Stecher, along with Nick Ritchie, was traded to the Calgary Flames from the Coyotes for Connor Mackey and Brett Ritchie. In playing out the remainder of the season with the Flames, Stecher increased his offensive output in notching 3 goals and 7 points through 20 games, however was unable to help Calgary qualify for the playoffs.

==== Return to Arizona ====
As a free agent, Stecher left the Flames and returned for a second stint with the Coyotes by signing a one-year, $1.1 million contract on July 1, 2023.

==== Edmonton Oilers ====
On March 7, 2024, Stecher, along with a 2027 seventh-round pick, was traded to the Edmonton Oilers in exchange for a 2024 fourth-round pick.

After recording two assists in seven regular season games, the Oilers signed Stecher to a two-year extension with an AAV of $787,500.

After playing only six games for the Oilers in the 2025–26 NHL season, Stecher was placed on waivers on November 15, 2025.

==== Toronto Maple Leafs ====
Stecher was claimed off waivers by the Toronto Maple Leafs on November 15, 2025. Stecher signed a two-year, $2.7 million contract extension with the Maple Leafs on June 30, 2026.

== International play ==
Medal record

Ice hockey

Representing Canada

World Championships
Gold medal – first place	2021 Latvia	
Silver medal – second place	2019 Slovakia	

On April 29, 2019, Stecher was selected to make his international debut after he was named to the Team Canada roster for the 2019 IIHF World Championship, held in Slovakia. He helped Canada progress through to the playoff rounds before losing the final to Finland to finish with the Silver Medal on May 26, 2019. Stecher finished the tournament posting one goal and two points in ten games from the blueline.

Stecher won the Gold Medal with Team Canada at the 2021 IIHF World Championship, beating Finland 3-2 in overtime on June 6, 2021. He had an assist on the game-winning overtime goal in Canada's quarterfinal match against Russia, finishing the tournament with two points in ten games.

== Personal life ==
Stecher was born in Richmond, British Columbia to parents Tracey and Peter Stecher alongside his two older siblings. He married his partner Emma Vincent in July 2025 in Napa, California with current and former teammates in attendance.

== Career statistics ==
=== Regular season and playoffs ===
			Regular season					Playoffs
Season	Team	League	GP	G	A	Pts	PIM	GP	G	A	Pts	PIM
2009–10	Greater Vancouver Canadians	BCMML	38	4	27	31	22	5	1	1	2	6
2010–11	Penticton Vees	BCHL	54	5	15	20	47	9	2	3	5	6
2011–12	Penticton Vees	BCHL	53	5	37	42	42	15	2	8	10	8
2012–13	Penticton Vees	BCHL	52	8	39	47	40	15	0	6	6	10
2013–14	U. of North Dakota	NCHC	42	2	9	11	14	—	—	—	—	—
2014–15	U. of North Dakota	NCHC	34	3	10	13	22	—	—	—	—	—
2015–16	U. of North Dakota	NCHC	43	8	21	29	37	—	—	—	—	—
2016–17	Utica Comets	AHL	4	0	1	1	4	—	—	—	—	—
2016–17	Vancouver Canucks	NHL	71	3	21	24	25	—	—	—	—	—
2017–18	Vancouver Canucks	NHL	68	1	10	11	35	—	—	—	—	—
2018–19	Vancouver Canucks	NHL	78	2	21	23	32	—	—	—	—	—
2019–20	Vancouver Canucks	NHL	69	5	12	17	32	17	2	1	3	10
2020–21	Detroit Red Wings	NHL	44	3	8	11	12	—	—	—	—	—
2021–22	Detroit Red Wings	NHL	16	1	1	2	9	—	—	—	—	—
2021–22	Los Angeles Kings	NHL	13	0	1	1	4	4	2	2	4	0
2022–23	Arizona Coyotes	NHL	61	0	7	7	29	—	—	—	—	—
2022–23	Calgary Flames	NHL	20	3	4	7	15	—	—	—	—	—
2023–24	Arizona Coyotes	NHL	47	1	4	5	24	—	—	—	—	—
2023–24	Edmonton Oilers	NHL	7	0	2	2	8	—	—	—	—	—
2024–25	Edmonton Oilers	NHL	66	3	4	7	27	8	0	0	0	2
2025–26	Edmonton Oilers	NHL	6	0	0	0	8	—	—	—	—	—
2025-26	Toronto Maple Leafs	NHL	58	3	11	14	12	—	—	—	—	—
NHL totals			624	25	106	131	272	29	4	3	7	12

=== International ===
Year	Team	Event	Result	GP	G	A	Pts	PIM
2019	Canada	WC	2nd place, silver medalist(s)	10	1	2	3	2
2021	Canada	WC	1st place, gold medalist(s)	10	1	1	2	2
Senior totals				20	2	3	5	4
