= Devon Toews =

Canadian ice hockey player (born 1994)

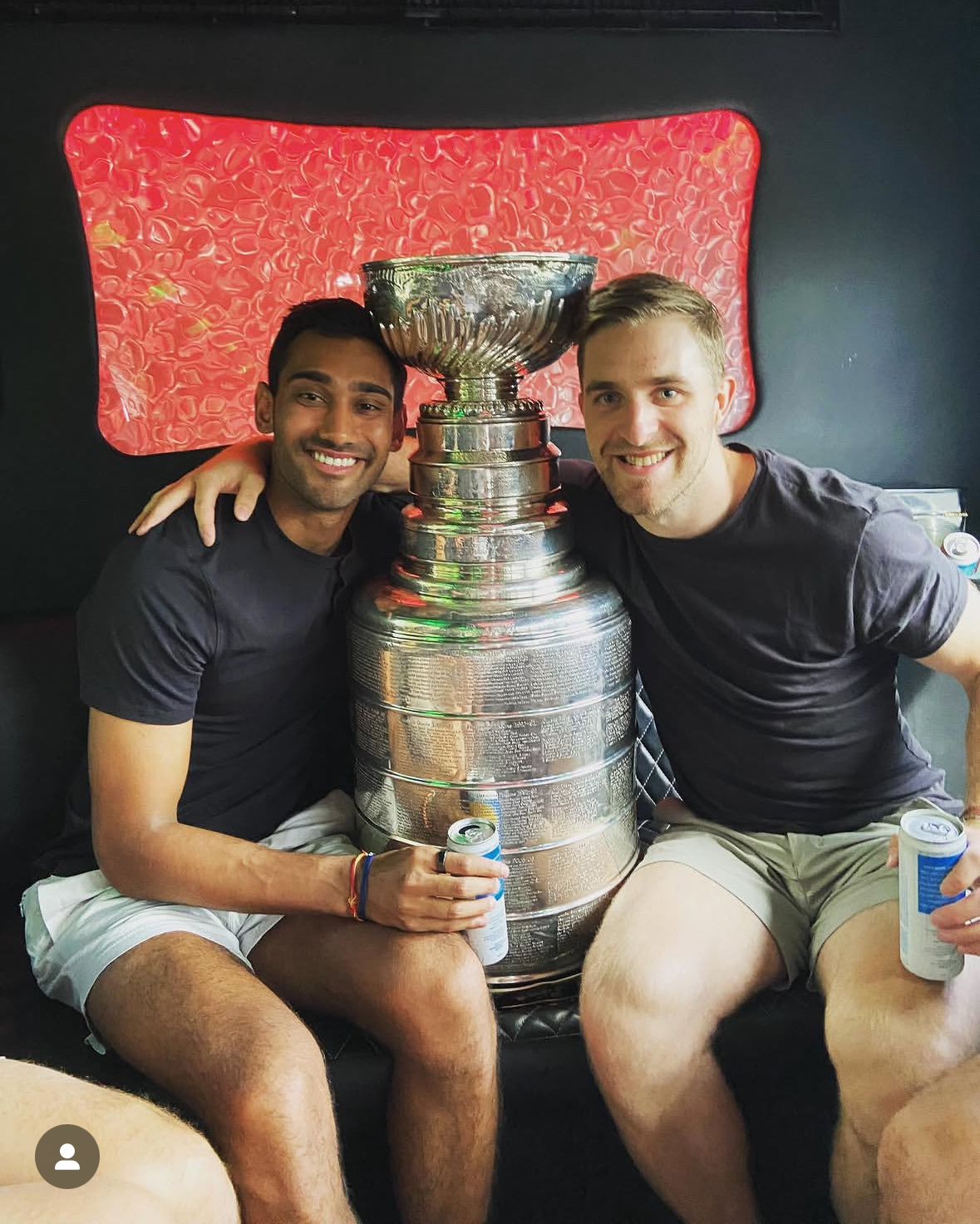
- Toews (right) with the Stanley Cup after winning the 2022 playoffs, with former high school teammate Dylan Kooner.
- Born: February 21, 1994 (age 32) Abbotsford, British Columbia, Canada
- Height: 6 ft 1 in (185 cm)
- Weight: 191 lb (87 kg; 13 st 9 lb)
- Position: Defence
- Shoots: Left
- NHL team Former teams: Colorado Avalanche; New York Islanders
- National team: Canada
- NHL draft: 108th overall, 2014; New York Islanders
- Playing career: 2016–present

Devon Toews (/dəˈvɑːn ˈteɪvz/ də-VAHN TAYVZ; born February 21, 1994) is a Canadian professional ice hockey player who is a defenceman for the Colorado Avalanche of the National Hockey League (NHL). He was drafted 108th overall by the New York Islanders in the 2014 NHL entry draft. Toews won the Stanley Cup with the Avalanche in 2022.

Prior to turning professional, Toews attended Quinnipiac University, where he was named to the All-ECAC Hockey Second Team.

== Playing career ==
Toews began playing youth hockey at Yale Hockey Academy at the age of six. He then played one season with the Abbotsford Hawks Bantam A1 Hawks, where he helped them win the B.C. bantam Tier 1 title and finish second at the Western Canadians. However, due to his short stature at the time, standing at 5’2”, Toews was initially overlooked by teams competing in the Western Hockey League (WHL) as he was emerging from bantam hockey. He joined the major-midget team the Fraser Valley Bruins with Mackenzie Skapski and they both suffered injuries as a result of a bus accident on December 11, 2009. Despite this, Toews returned to the Fraser Valley Bruins, where he experienced a growth spurt, and led all BC Hockey Major Midget League defencemen with 37 points in 39 games during the 2010–11 season. This earned him a roster spot on the Surrey Eagles of the British Columbia Hockey League (BCHL).

Toews played with the Surrey Eagles for two seasons. In his first season, he was named to the 2011–12 BCHL All-Rookie Team, and was offered a full hockey scholarship to play at Quinnipiac University. However, Toews returned to the Eagles for the 2012–13 season, where he won the 2013 BCHL Championship and the Western Canada Cup in Nanaimo. Toews was named MVP of the Western Canada Cup and was selected for the all-tournament team. On November 1, 2012, Toews was selected to represent Team Canada West at the 2012 World Junior A Challenge. He played in four games and earned a silver medal. He was also a member of the BCHL First All-Star Team. The Eagles competed in the 2013 Royal Bank Cup, losing to the Summerside Western Capitals in the semi-finals. Toews was nonetheless named Top Defencemen of the tournament's preliminary round.

=== Collegiate ===
Toews began his freshman year at Quinnipiac University during the 2013–14 season. While majoring in accounting, he appeared in 37 games and totaled 17 points. Toews recorded his first collegiate goal on November 27, in a 3–3 tie with Providence and ended the season with 17 points. At the conclusion of the season, he was named to the ECAC Hockey All-Academic Team due to having a GPA of 3.46. Although he had previously been skipped over twice in the NHL entry draft as an 18- and 19-year-old, Toews was drafted 108th overall by the New York Islanders at the 2014 NHL entry draft.

Unsigned to a contract, Toews returned to Quinnipiac for his following two seasons. In his sophomore season, Toews appeared in 31 games for the Bobcats. He played in the ECAC Hockey quarterfinals against Union College, where his two late period assists helped send Game One to triple overtime, which the Bobcats won. While the Bobcats beat Union in three games, they lost in the semi-finals against Harvard University. At the conclusion of the season, Toews was again named to the ECAC Hockey All-Academic Team.

Over his three seasons with the Bobcats, Toews led Quinnipiac to multiple NCAA Tournaments. During his final season with the team, he helped lead the Bobcats to the 2016 National Championship against North Dakota. Although the team lost 5–1, Toews set career highs that season in goals, assists and points, earning All-ECAC Hockey Second Team honours. He was also named a New England Second Team All-Star and was named a finalist for the ECAC Hockey Best Defensive Defenseman as he ended the season with a +27 while collecting 30 points.

=== Professional ===
==== New York Islanders ====
On April 15, 2016, Toews opted to conclude his collegiate career and signed a three-year, entry-level contract with the New York Islanders. Despite ending his collegiate career, Toews continued to take classes from Quinnipiac and graduated in May 2017. In his rookie season with Bridgeport, Toews tied all rookie defencemen in points and finished tenth in amongst all defencemen in the AHL. Toews also tied Raymond Giroux's team record for most assists by a rookie defenceman with 40. As a result, he was selected to participate in the 2017 AHL All-Star Classic and was named to the AHL's All-Rookie team at the completion of the season. During the 2017 AHL All-Star Classic, Toews won the Fastest Skater competition with a time of 13.478.

Prior to the 2017–18 season, Toews attended the Islanders training camp where he competed against Adam Pelech, Scott Mayfield, and Ryan Pulock for a spot on the final roster. He was returned to the Sound Tigers where he played in 30 games and earned 22 points before suffering a season-ending shoulder injury on December 30 in a game against the Binghamton Devils, and was forced to undergo surgery. Due to the nature of the injury, Toews was out for the remainder of the 2017–18 season. Despite not playing for the remainder of his contract, the Islanders re-signed Toews to a two-year contract extension on July 16, 2018.

After attending the Islanders' training camp ahead of the 2018–19 season, Toews was reassigned to the Sound Tigers. On December 19, 2018, Toews earned his first NHL recall after he had recorded 19 points in 24 games, which ranked second amongst Sound Tiger defencemen. Toews made his NHL debut on December 23 against the Dallas Stars while playing on a pairing with Luca Sbisa. He wore the jersey number 25, becoming the 20th Islander to don that number. On January 3, 2019, in his fifth NHL game, Toews recorded his first NHL point, the game-winning goal, in a 3–2 overtime win against the Chicago Blackhawks. He became the 18th player in the modern era to score their first NHL goal in overtime. The Islanders qualified for the 2019 Stanley Cup playoffs, where they defeated the Pittsburgh Penguins in four games. The team then faced the Carolina Hurricanes in the second round where Toews subsequently recorded his first career playoff goal on May 1, 2019. He became the third Islanders rookie defenceman in 25 years to score a postseason goal. Following their elimination, Toews trained at Quinnipiac University and in Vancouver with NHL veterans Morgan Rielly and Shea Theodore.

==== Colorado Avalanche ====
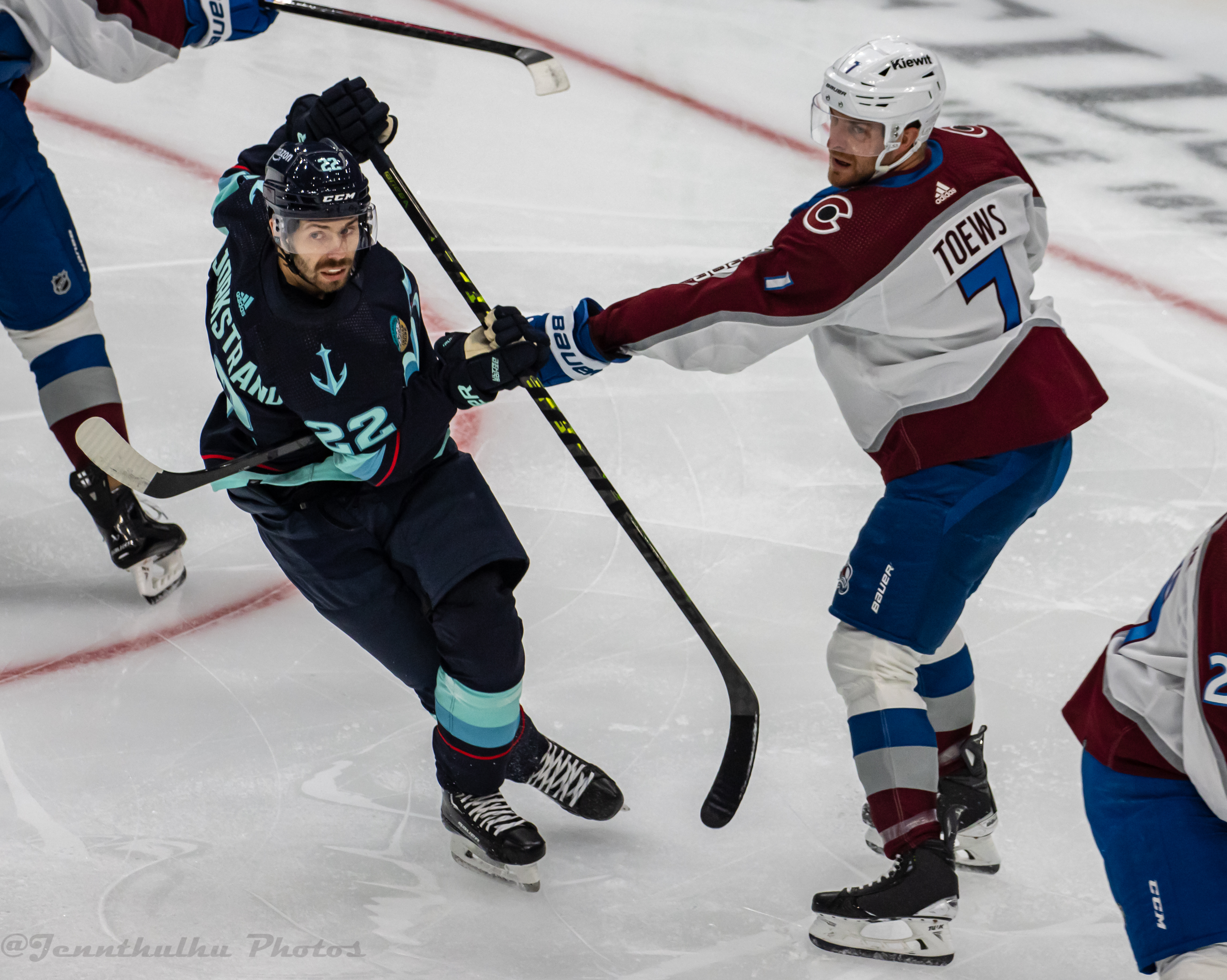
Toews with the Colorado Avalanche in 2023.

As a restricted free agent with the Islanders, due to salary cap constraints, Toews was traded by New York to the Colorado Avalanche in exchange for 2021 and 2022 second-round draft picks, on October 12, 2020. On October 27, Toews was signed to a four-year, $16.4 million contract with the Avalanche. In his first season with the Avalanche, he primarily played alongside Cale Makar while leading the team in ice-time per game in both regular season and playoffs.

On June 26, 2022, Toews won the Stanley Cup, his first, with the Avalanche.

On October 13, 2023, Toews signed a seven-year, $50.75 million ($7.25 million AAV) contract extension with the Avalanche.

== International play ==
Medal record

Representing Canada

Men's ice hockey

Olympic Games
Silver medal – second place	2026 Milano Cortina	

4 Nations Face-Off
Winner	2025 Canada/United States	

On December 31, 2025, he was named to Canada's roster to compete at the 2026 Winter Olympics.

== Personal life ==
Toews was born to parents Werner and Tammy Toews and was raised in Abbotsford, British Columbia, along with one brother, Nolan. Toews's parents were baseball fans who named their sons after Toronto Blue Jays center fielder Devon White and Texas Rangers pitcher Nolan Ryan.

Toews and his wife Kerry have four children. They became engaged in 2018 and married in October 2020. At their wedding, in lieu of wedding favors, they made a donation to Hockey Fights Cancer in honor of Demetra Anas, who was the mother of Toews' Quinnipiac teammate Sam Anas and who had died of breast cancer two months earlier.

Despite their shared last name, Toews is not related to fellow Canadian ice hockey player and former Chicago Blackhawks captain Jonathan Toews.

== Career statistics ==
=== Regular season and playoffs ===
			Regular season					Playoffs
Season	Team	League	GP	G	A	Pts	PIM	GP	G	A	Pts	PIM
2009–10	Fraser Valley Bruins AAA	BCMMHL	39	2	5	7	60	—	—	—	—	—
2009–10	Yale Secondary School	HSBC	3	2	9	11	0	3	3	8	11	2
2010–11	Fraser Valley Bruins AAA	BCMMHL	39	12	25	37	52	—	—	—	—	—
2010–11	Abbotsford Pilots	PIJHL	5	1	1	2	0	13	1	5	6	2
2010–11	Yale Secondary School	HSBC	4	6	8	14	0	—	—	—	—	—
2011–12	Surrey Eagles	BCHL	54	7	22	29	42	12	5	7	12	15
2012–13	Surrey Eagles	BCHL	48	10	37	47	55	17	0	9	9	10
2013–14	Quinnipiac University	ECAC	37	1	16	17	10	—	—	—	—	—
2014–15	Quinnipiac University	ECAC	31	4	16	20	16	—	—	—	—	—
2015–16	Quinnipiac University	ECAC	40	7	23	30	26	—	—	—	—	—
2016–17	Bridgeport Sound Tigers	AHL	76	5	40	45	18	—	—	—	—	—
2017–18	Bridgeport Sound Tigers	AHL	30	8	14	22	8	—	—	—	—	—
2018–19	Bridgeport Sound Tigers	AHL	24	5	14	19	16	—	—	—	—	—
2018–19	New York Islanders	NHL	48	5	13	18	4	8	1	4	5	0
2019–20	New York Islanders	NHL	68	6	22	28	16	22	2	8	10	6
2020–21	Colorado Avalanche	NHL	53	9	22	31	16	10	1	5	6	2
2021–22	Colorado Avalanche	NHL	66	13	44	57	20	20	5	10	15	8
2022–23	Colorado Avalanche	NHL	80	7	43	50	26	7	1	8	9	0
2023–24	Colorado Avalanche	NHL	82	12	38	50	18	10	1	5	6	2
2024–25	Colorado Avalanche	NHL	76	10	34	44	26	7	1	3	4	2
2025–26	Colorado Avalanche	NHL	68	3	21	24	32	13	2	9	11	2
NHL totals			541	65	237	302	158	97	14	52	66	22

=== International ===
Year	Team	Event	Result	GP	G	A	Pts	PIM
2012	Canada West	WJAC	2nd place, silver medalist(s)	4	0	2	2	14
2025	Canada	4NF	1st place, gold medalist(s)	4	0	0	0	2
2026	Canada	OG	2nd place, silver medalist(s)	6	1	2	3	0
Junior totals				4	0	2	2	14
Senior totals				10	1	2	3	2

== Awards and honours ==
Award	Year	Ref
BCHL
BCHL All-Rookie Team	2012	
BCHL First All-Star Team	2013	
MVP of the Western Canada Cup	2013	
Top Defencemen (RBC Cup)	2013	
College
ECAC Hockey All-Academic Team	2014, 2015	
All-ECAC Hockey Second Team	2016	
New England Second Team All-Star	2016	
AHL
AHL All-Rookie Team	2017	
AHL All-Star Game	2017	
NHL
Stanley Cup champion	2022	
