= Alexander Kerfoot =

Canadian ice hockey player (born 1994)

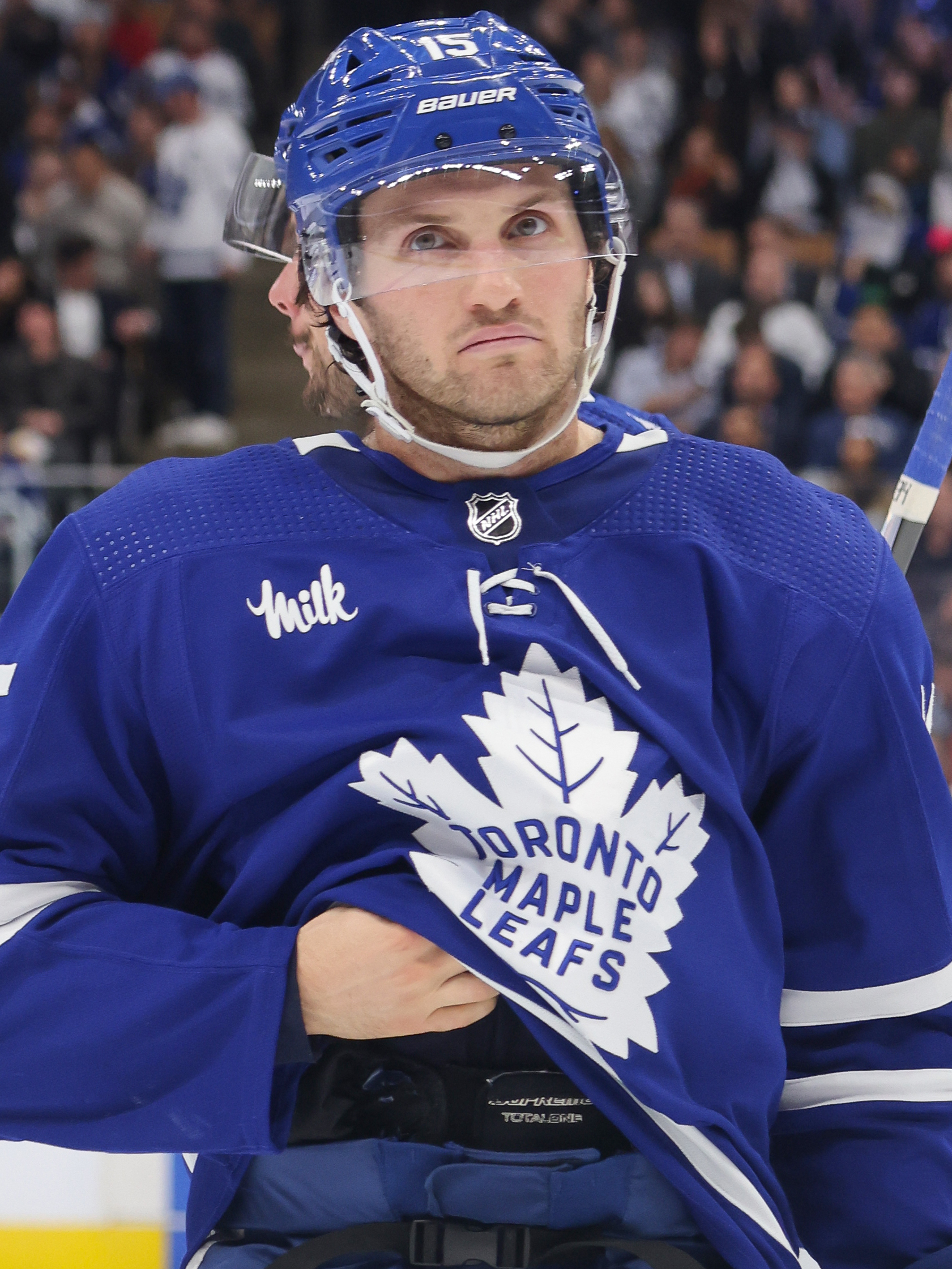
- Kerfoot with the Toronto Maple Leafs in 2022
- Born: August 11, 1994 (age 32) Vancouver, British Columbia, Canada
- Height: 5 ft 11 in (180 cm)
- Weight: 188 lb (85 kg; 13 st 6 lb)
- Position: Forward
- Shoots: Left
- NHL team Former teams: Nashville Predators; Colorado Avalanche; Toronto Maple Leafs; Arizona Coyotes; Utah Mammoth
- NHL draft: 150th overall, 2012; New Jersey Devils
- Playing career: 2017–present

Alexander Douglas Kerfoot (born August 11, 1994) is a Canadian professional ice hockey player who is a forward for the Nashville Predators of the National Hockey League (NHL). He was selected in the fifth round, 150th overall, by the New Jersey Devils in the 2012 NHL entry draft and has previously played in the NHL for the Colorado Avalanche, Toronto Maple Leafs, Arizona Coyotes and Utah Mammoth.

== Playing career ==
=== Amateur ===
Kerfoot was drafted as a youth in the 12th round, 254th overall, by the Seattle Thunderbirds of the Western Hockey League (WHL) in the 2009 WHL bantam draft. A Vancouver native, Kerfoot opted to play as a midget with the Vancouver NorthWest Giants in the BC Hockey Major Midget League (BCMML) alongside future NHLer Sam Reinhart and future PWHLer Kaleigh Fratkin. In his second season with the Giants in 2011, Kerfoot led the team alongside Reinhart to the championship. He led the BCMML with 72 assists and 108 points before earning MVP honours at the Telus Cup. He finished the 2010–11 season by joining the Coquitlam Express of the British Columbia Hockey League (BCHL).

On May 30, 2011, Kerfoot agreed to return to the Express for the 2011–12 season while completing his final year of high school at Collingwood School. In the midst of the season, Kerfoot was selected to play for the Team Canada West squad at the World Junior A Challenge in Langley, British Columbia. He scored the winning goal in overtime to defeat Sweden in the semi-finals in which the team advanced to eventually win the gold medal. Kerfoot also enjoyed a standout season with the Express, placing third on the team after recording 25 goals and 44 assists (69 points) in 51 games. He earned recognition in collecting the Coastal Rookie of the Year honours and a place in the All-Rookie Team and was announced in the First All-Star Team while winning the Bob Fenton Trophy as the BCHL's most sportsmanlike player.

At the 2012 NHL entry draft, Kerfoot was selected by the New Jersey Devils in the fifth round, 150th overall. On August 20, 2012, Kerfoot announced his commitment to play NCAA hockey at Harvard University with the Crimson men's ice hockey team in the fall of 2013. Returning to the Express for his draft-plus-one year (due to his late birthday), Kerfoot appeared in just 16 games for the 2012–13 season before he was sidelined through injury.

In beginning his collegiate career in the 2013–14 season, Kerfoot made his debut for Harvard and registered an assist in a 3–0 victory over Bentley University on October 26, 2013. He scored his first goal the next game in a 3–3 tie with Rensselaer Polytechnic Institute on October 29. In his freshman year, Kerfoot finished with 8 goals and 6 assists (14 points) in 25 games.

Kerfoot adjusted offensively in sophomore season, showing his playmaking ability to produce 30 points in 27 games. Alongside Jimmy Vesey and Kyle Criscuolo, Kerfoot solidified his breakout season in the following 2015–16 season in leading the Crimson with 30 assists as a junior. He was selected to the Second All-Ivy Team and earned a spot in the ECAC Third All-Star Team.

In his senior season, with the departure of his linemates Vesey and Criscuolo, Kerfoot was announced as team co-captain of the Crimson (alongside Devin Tringale) for the 2016–17 season. Kerfoot flourished in his senior year, helping take the Crimson to the Frozen Four for the first time since 1994. In co-leading the team with 45 points in 36 games, he received the John Tudor Memorial Cup as Harvard's MVP, earning ECAC First Team honours and was named as a top-ten finalist for the Hobey Baker Award as the top men's ice hockey player in the NCAA. He completed his career with the Crimson with 123 points in 121 games.

=== Professional ===
Having completed his four-year collegiate career, Kerfoot chose not to sign a contract with the NHL organization that drafted him, the New Jersey Devils, rendering him a free agent. Having rejected the Devils due to their prospect depth at the centre position, Kerfoot received NHL-wide interest including from his hometown club, the Vancouver Canucks. However, on August 23, 2017, Kerfoot signed a two-year, entry-level contract with the Colorado Avalanche.

After an impressive training camp with the Avalanche, Kerfoot played in a scoring-line role throughout the pre-season and secured a spot on the opening roster for the 2017–18 season. He made his NHL debut with the Avalanche, playing on a line with Matt Duchene and Nail Yakupov. He registered his first NHL point with an assist on Tyson Barrie's game-winning goal in a 4–2 victory over the New York Rangers at Madison Square Garden on October 5, 2017. He scored his first NHL goal on October 11 against the Boston Bruins in the Avalanche's season home opener.

On July 1, 2019, Kerfoot, along with Tyson Barrie and a sixth-round pick in the 2020 NHL entry draft, were traded to the Toronto Maple Leafs in exchange for Nazem Kadri, Calle Rosén and a third-round pick in 2020. On July 4, as a restricted free agent, Kerfoot signed a four-year, $14 million contract with the Maple Leafs (effective from the 2019–20 season through to the 2022–23 season) worth an average annual value of $3.5 million.

Following his fourth season with the Maple Leafs in 2022–23 season, Kerfoot having completed his contract left the organization as a free agent and was signed to a two-year, $7 million contract with the Arizona Coyotes on July 1, 2023.

Shortly after the end of the 2023–24 season, the Coyotes' franchise was suspended and team assets were subsequently transferred to the expansion team Utah Hockey Club; as a result, Kerfoot became a member of the Utah team. The team was named the Mammoth the following season, and Kerfoot became an alternate captain for the team.

On July 1, 2026, Kerfoot joined his fifth NHL club, after he was signed as a free agent to a two-year, $7 million contract with the Nashville Predators.

== Personal ==
Kerfoot's father, Greg Kerfoot, is the majority owner of Vancouver Whitecaps FC of Major League Soccer (MLS). He married Marissa Balleza, a field hockey player he met while at Harvard. She set Harvard's all-time record for career goals and points in 2016.

Alexander majored in economics while at Harvard. He is the older brother to Colton and Daniel, both of whom also play hockey—Colton mirrored Alexander's path in committing to Harvard and played his freshman season as Alexander captained the Crimson in his final year in 2016–17.

== Career statistics ==
| | | | Regular season | | | | | Playoffs |
| Season | Team | League | GP | G | A | Pts | PIM | GP | G | A | Pts | PIM |
|---|---|---|---|---|---|---|---|---|---|---|---|---|
| 2009–10 | Vancouver NW Giants | BCMML | 26 | 7 | 14 | 21 | 4 | — | — | — | — | — |
| 2010–11 | Vancouver NW Giants | BCMML | 38 | 36 | 72 | 108 | 58 | 5 | 6 | 6 | 12 | 6 |
| 2010–11 | Coquitlam Express | BCHL | 5 | 0 | 0 | 0 | 0 | 1 | 0 | 0 | 0 | 0 |
| 2011–12 | Coquitlam Express | BCHL | 51 | 25 | 44 | 69 | 24 | 6 | 4 | 0 | 4 | 6 |
| 2012–13 | Coquitlam Express | BCHL | 16 | 8 | 11 | 19 | 16 | — | — | — | — | — |
| 2013–14 | Harvard University | ECAC | 25 | 8 | 6 | 14 | 8 | — | — | — | — | — |
| 2014–15 | Harvard University | ECAC | 27 | 8 | 22 | 30 | 12 | — | — | — | — | — |
| 2015–16 | Harvard University | ECAC | 33 | 4 | 30 | 34 | 16 | — | — | — | — | — |
| 2016–17 | Harvard University | ECAC | 36 | 16 | 29 | 45 | 18 | — | — | — | — | — |
| 2017–18 | Colorado Avalanche | NHL | 79 | 19 | 24 | 43 | 28 | 6 | 2 | 0 | 2 | 2 |
| 2018–19 | Colorado Avalanche | NHL | 78 | 15 | 27 | 42 | 38 | 12 | 0 | 3 | 3 | 6 |
| 2019–20 | Toronto Maple Leafs | NHL | 65 | 9 | 19 | 28 | 32 | 5 | 0 | 3 | 3 | 2 |
| 2020–21 | Toronto Maple Leafs | NHL | 56 | 8 | 15 | 23 | 12 | 7 | 1 | 5 | 6 | 4 |
| 2021–22 | Toronto Maple Leafs | NHL | 82 | 13 | 38 | 51 | 20 | 7 | 1 | 1 | 2 | 4 |
| 2022–23 | Toronto Maple Leafs | NHL | 82 | 10 | 22 | 32 | 30 | 11 | 2 | 0 | 2 | 4 |
| 2023–24 | Arizona Coyotes | NHL | 82 | 13 | 32 | 45 | 26 | — | — | — | — | — |
| 2024–25 | Utah Hockey Club | NHL | 81 | 11 | 17 | 28 | 14 | — | — | — | — | — |
| 2025–26 | Utah Mammoth | NHL | 34 | 7 | 6 | 13 | 23 | 6 | 0 | 1 | 1 | 6 |
| NHL totals | | | 639 | 105 | 200 | 305 | 223 | 54 | 6 | 13 | 19 | 28 |

== Awards and honours ==
| Award | Year | Ref |
BCMML
| Telus Cup MVP | 2011 | |
BCHL
| Coastal First All-Star Team | 2012 | |
| Coastal Most Sportsmanlike player | 2012 | |
| Coastal Rookie of the Year | 2012 | |
| All-Rookie Team | 2012 | |
College
| All-ECAC Third Team | 2016 | |
| All-Ivy League Second Team | 2016 | |
| East Second All-American Team | 2017 | |
| New England D1 All-Stars | 2017 | |
| All-Ivy League First Team | 2017 | |
