= Ken Lowe =

Canadian medical trainer

Ken Lowe was the head medical trainer of the Edmonton Oilers for 21 years until 2010, and had been with the team since 1989 overall. He has also represented Canada in various international tournaments.

== Career ==
From 1982 to 1988, Ken served as the athletic therapist of the Edmonton Eskimos. He joined the Edmonton Oilers in 1989, and was part of their 1990 Stanley Cup championship team. Ken also represented Canada the 2002 and 2006 Winter Olympics, the 1996 and 2004 World Cup of Hockey, and 1994 World Championships.

== Personal life ==
Ken is the older brother of Kevin Lowe, a retired hockey player and current vice-chairman of Oilers Entertainment Group. Ken and his wife, Marianne have two daughters Amanda and Melissa, who is a Canadian bobsleigh athlete.
