= Adam Tambellini =

Canadian ice hockey player (born 1994)

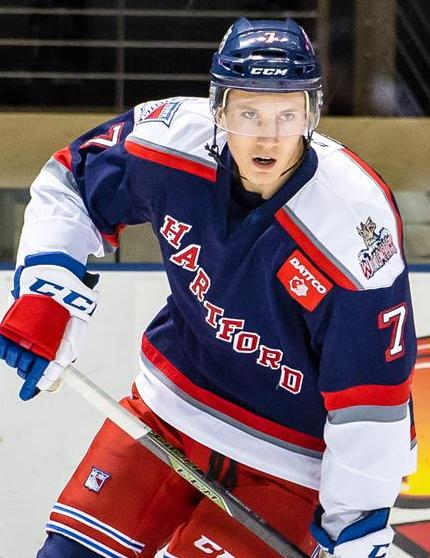
- Tambellini with the Hartford Wolf Pack in 2015
- Born: November 1, 1994 (age 31) Edmonton, Alberta, Canada
- Height: 6 ft 4 in (193 cm)
- Weight: 194 lb (88 kg; 13 st 12 lb)
- Position: Forward
- Shoots: Left
- NL team Former teams: HC Davos; Hartford Wolf Pack; Belleville Senators; Rögle BK
- National team: Canada
- NHL draft: 65th overall, 2013; New York Rangers
- Playing career: 2015–present

Adam Tambellini (born November 1, 1994) is a Canadian professional ice hockey forward who is currently playing for HC Davos of the National League (NL). Tambellini was selected by the New York Rangers in the third round (65th overall) of the 2013 NHL entry draft.

== Playing career ==
Tambellini played top midget hockey in Alberta before playing three games with the Sherwood Park Crusaders in the Alberta Junior Hockey League during the 2010–11 season as a 16-year-old. He then continued his junior career, playing two seasons in the British Columbia Hockey League (BCHL) with the Vernon Vipers and the Surrey Eagles before committing to college hockey with the University of North Dakota in the National Collegiate Hockey Conference.

After his selection by the Rangers at the 2013 NHL entry draft, Tambellini played just 16 games in his freshman year with the Fighting Hawks in 2013–14 season. He then opted to leave college to return to Canada to play major junior hockey in the Western Hockey League (WHL) after his rights were acquired by the Calgary Hitmen from the Portland Winterhawks on January 8, 2014. He regained his scoring touch in the WHL playing out the remainder of the season in producing 39 points in just 31 games.

In his first full season with the Hitmen in 2014–15, Tambellini scored 86 points in 71 games to earn a selection to the East Second All-Star Team. On March 10, 2015, it was announced that Tambellini had signed a three-year, entry-level contract with the New York Rangers.

In his first professional season with the Rangers organization, Tambellini was assigned to its AHL affiliate, the Hartford Wolf Pack for the 2015–16 season. In his rookie campaign, Tambellini finished with a promising 17 goals and 32 points in 74 games.

Following his third season with the Wolf Pack, Tambellini was not extended a qualifying offer at the conclusion of his entry-level contract. As a free agent, he signed a one-year, two-way contract with the Ottawa Senators on July 25, 2018. After attending his first training camp with Ottawa, Tambellini was assigned to Belleville to play for the Senators for the 2018–19 season

After only one season with Ottawa, Tambellini signed with MODO Hockey. The following season, he signed with Rögle BK.

After 4 years with Rögle BK, Tambellini signed a two-year contract with HC Davos. In July 2025, he signed an early two-year extension with Davos, lasting until the end of the 2027-28 season.

== International play ==
Tambellini played for Team Canada at the 2022 Winter Olympics, scoring seven points in five games and leading Canada in scoring for the tournament.

== Personal ==
Tambellini is the son of former Edmonton Oilers general manager, Steve Tambellini, and his older brother Jeff also played professionally in the NHL. His grandfather Addie Tambellini also played ice hockey.

== Career statistics ==
=== Regular season and playoffs ===
			Regular season					Playoffs
Season	Team	League	GP	G	A	Pts	PIM	GP	G	A	Pts	PIM
2010–11	Sherwood Park Crusaders	AJHL	3	1	0	1	0	—	—	—	—	—
2011–12	Vernon Vipers	BCHL	55	27	29	56	28	—	—	—	—	—
2012–13	Vernon Vipers	BCHL	36	22	17	39	18	—	—	—	—	—
2012–13	Surrey Eagles	BCHL	16	14	12	26	8	17	10	8	18	6
2013–14	University of North Dakota	NCHC	16	2	2	4	31	—	—	—	—	—
2013–14	Calgary Hitmen	WHL	31	17	22	39	10	6	4	5	9	2
2014–15	Calgary Hitmen	WHL	71	47	39	86	30	16	13	13	26	10
2015–16	Hartford Wolf Pack	AHL	74	17	15	32	24	—	—	—	—	—
2016–17	Hartford Wolf Pack	AHL	68	13	22	35	22	—	—	—	—	—
2017–18	Hartford Wolf Pack	AHL	69	16	16	32	20	—	—	—	—	—
2018–19	Belleville Senators	AHL	72	13	19	32	18	—	—	—	—	—
2019–20	Modo Hockey	Allsv	37	28	35	63	51	—	—	—	—	—
2020–21	Rögle BK	SHL	37	15	13	28	14	14	6	4	10	6
2021–22	Rögle BK	SHL	39	24	19	43	6	11	4	6	10	2
2022–23	Rögle BK	SHL	49	23	23	46	14	8	0	4	4	0
2023–24	Rögle BK	SHL	51	11	19	30	14	10	2	2	4	4
2024–25	HC Davos	NL	52	22	19	41	2	9	7	0	7	6
2025–26	HC Davos	NL	47	18	16	34	29	8	4	6	10	6
AHL totals			283	59	72	131	84	—	—	—	—	—
SHL totals			176	73	74	147	48	43	12	16	28	12

=== International ===
Year	Team	Event	Result	GP	G	A	Pts	PIM
2022	Canada	OG	6th	5	3	4	7	0
Senior totals				5	3	4	7	0

== Awards and honours ==
Award	Year
BCHL
Second All-Star Team	2013
Champion (Surrey Eagles)	2013
WHL
East Second All-Star Team	2015
International
Spengler Cup scoring leader	2024
Spengler Cup All-Star Team	2024
