= Steven Fogarty =

American ice hockey player (born 1993)

- Born: April 19, 1993 (age 33) Chambersburg, Pennsylvania, U.S.
- Height: 6 ft 3 in (191 cm)
- Weight: 205 lb (93 kg; 14 st 9 lb)
- Position: Forward
- Shot: Right
- Played for: New York Rangers; Buffalo Sabres; Boston Bruins; Minnesota Wild
- NHL draft: 72nd overall, 2011; New York Rangers
- Playing career: 2016–2024

Steven Fogarty (born April 19, 1993) is an American former professional ice hockey forward. Fogarty was drafted by the New York Rangers in the third round, 72nd overall, of the 2011 NHL entry draft.

== Playing career ==
Fogarty was born in Chambersburg, Pennsylvania but moved with his family to Egypt and then Marlton, New Jersey before finally settling in Minnesota where he grew up playing junior hockey. He played college hockey for the University of Notre Dame from 2012 to 2016 and served as the captain for the Notre Dame Fighting Irish hockey team his junior and senior years. On March 29, 2016, Fogarty embarked on his professional career by signing a two-year, entry-level contract with the New York Rangers. He was assigned to complete the 2015–16 season with AHL affiliate, the Hartford Wolf Pack.

Fogarty made his National Hockey League debut for the Rangers in the final game of the 2017–18 season, going scoreless with 2 penalty minutes during the game before being returned to Hartford to finish the season.

As a free agent from the Rangers, Fogarty left to sign a one-year, two-way contract with the Buffalo Sabres on October 19, 2020. On March 31, 2021, Fogarty scored his first career NHL goal against the Philadelphia Flyers. He finished his lone season with the Sabres, registering 1 goal and 3 points through 9 games.

As a free agent for the second consecutive season, Fogarty was signed to a one-year, two-way contract with the Boston Bruins on July 28, 2021.

On July 13, 2022, Fogarty joined his fourth NHL organization after signing a two-year, two-way contract with the Minnesota Wild.

Fogarty announced his retirement following nine professional seasons on July 8, 2024. He finished his career having made 31 career appearances at the NHL level.

== Career statistics ==
			Regular season					Playoffs
Season	Team	League	GP	G	A	Pts	PIM	GP	G	A	Pts	PIM
2009–10	Edina High	USHS	25	18	12	30	4	6	3	7	10	2
2010–11	Edina High	USHS	24	23	17	40	12	6	2	7	9	10
2010–11	Chicago Steel	USHL	6	2	0	2	2	—	—	—	—	—
2011–12	Penticton Vees	BCHL	60	33	49	82	32	15	4	4	8	12
2012–13	U. of Notre Dame	CCHA	41	5	5	10	4	—	—	—	—	—
2013–14	U. of Notre Dame	HE	33	3	8	11	10	—	—	—	—	—
2014–15	U. of Notre Dame	HE	39	9	12	21	6	—	—	—	—	—
2015–16	U. of Notre Dame	HE	37	10	13	23	26	—	—	—	—	—
2015–16	Hartford Wolf Pack	AHL	3	0	1	1	0	—	—	—	—	—
2016–17	Hartford Wolf Pack	AHL	66	7	13	20	21	—	—	—	—	—
2017–18	Hartford Wolf Pack	AHL	63	9	11	20	22	—	—	—	—	—
2017–18	New York Rangers	NHL	1	0	0	0	2	—	—	—	—	—
2018–19	Hartford Wolf Pack	AHL	66	21	31	52	50	—	—	—	—	—
2018–19	New York Rangers	NHL	10	0	0	0	0	—	—	—	—	—
2019–20	Hartford Wolf Pack	AHL	54	13	24	37	30	—	—	—	—	—
2019–20	New York Rangers	NHL	7	0	0	0	0	1	0	0	0	0
2020–21	Rochester Americans	AHL	16	7	3	10	10	—	—	—	—	—
2020–21	Buffalo Sabres	NHL	9	1	2	3	8	—	—	—	—	—
2021–22	Providence Bruins	AHL	62	12	30	42	34	2	0	0	0	0
2021–22	Boston Bruins	NHL	2	0	0	0	2	—	—	—	—	—
2022–23	Iowa Wild	AHL	65	19	30	49	63	2	1	0	1	0
2022–23	Minnesota Wild	NHL	2	0	0	0	0	—	—	—	—	—
2023–24	Iowa Wild	AHL	69	18	19	37	52	—	—	—	—	—
NHL totals			31	1	2	3	12	1	0	0	0	0

== Awards and honors ==
Award	Year
BCHL
All-Rookie Team	2012
