= Kevin Lowe =

Canadian ice hockey player and executive (born 1959)

- Hockey Hall of Fame, 2020
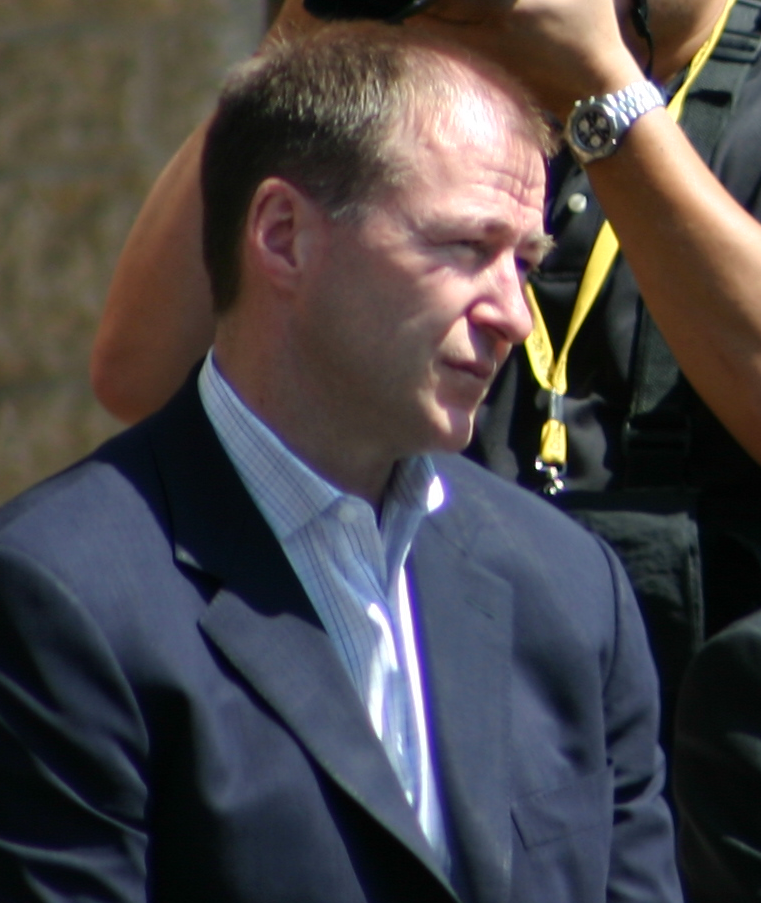
- Lowe in 2006
- Born: April 15, 1959 (age 67) Lachute, Quebec, Canada
- Height: 6 ft 2 in (188 cm)
- Weight: 200 lb (91 kg; 14 st 4 lb)
- Position: Defence
- Shot: Left
- Played for: Edmonton Oilers; New York Rangers
- Coached for: Edmonton Oilers
- National team: Canada
- NHL draft: 21st overall, 1979; Edmonton Oilers
- Playing career: 1979–1998
- Coaching career: 1998–2000
- Website: kevinlowe.ca
Medal record
Representing Canada
Ice hockey
World Championships
Bronze medal – third place	1982 Finland
Canada Cup
Gold medal – first place	1984 Canada

Kevin Hugh Lowe (born April 15, 1959) is a Canadian professional ice hockey executive, former coach and former player. Lowe was the vice-chairman of Oilers Entertainment Group until his retirement on August 2, 2022, having formerly served as head coach and then general manager of the Edmonton Oilers. As a defenceman, he played for the Edmonton Oilers and the New York Rangers from 1979 to 1998.

Over his career, Lowe won the Stanley Cup six times. In 1990, he was awarded the King Clancy Memorial Trophy. He was elected to the Hockey Hall of Fame in 2020 and named to the Order of Hockey in Canada in 2021.

== Background and early career ==
In 1976 Lowe joined the Quebec Remparts of the Quebec Major Junior Hockey League. An Anglophone, he learned French as the team used it, and in 1978 was named captain, the first English captain in team history. Over 201 games with the Remparts Lowe scored 42 goals and 131 assists for 173 points, along with 245 PIM. At one point he was in negotiations with the Birmingham Bulls of the World Hockey Association (WHA), but was reluctant to join them, and when it was announced the Bulls would not join the NHL the point was moot.

He was drafted in the first round, 21st overall, of the 1979 NHL entry draft by the Edmonton Oilers, the franchise's first NHL draft selection.

== NHL playing career ==
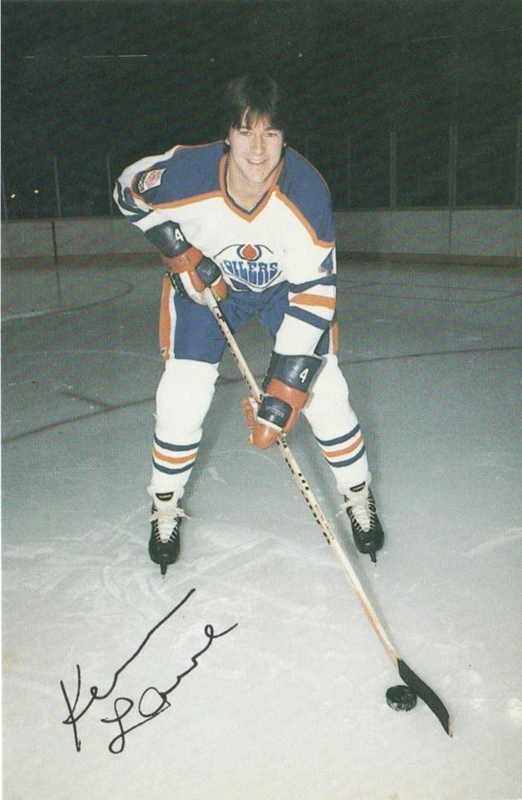
Lowe with the Edmonton Oilers c. 1979

Lowe played 13 full seasons in his first stint with the Oilers and helped lead them to five Stanley Cup championships.

During his time with the Oilers, he was the main narrator of The Boys on the Bus, journalist Bob McKeown's 1987 documentary film about the team.

During the Oilers' run to the 1988 Stanley Cup, Lowe played with a broken wrist and a full cast, a potential explanation for his point totals (0-2-2 in 19 games), yet he didn't miss a single playoff game. On the night the Oilers won the Cup, Wayne Gretzky informed the media that Lowe was also hiding broken ribs throughout the playoffs.

Lowe became team captain for the 1991–92 season after Mark Messier was traded to the New York Rangers. Leading the Oilers to an ugly 1-5-1 start in early October, the team finished with a 36-34-10 record.

The Oilers traded him to the New York Rangers, in December 1992 (Lowe was a restricted free agent). In 1994, he won the Stanley Cup with six other ex-Oilers—Glenn Anderson, Jeff Beukeboom, Adam Graves, Craig MacTavish, Mark Messier, and Esa Tikkanen—bringing his total to six.

In 1996, he re-joined the Oilers as a free agent and played another full season. He started the 1997–98 season with the Oilers as well but only played 7 games before being forced to retire due to an inner-ear virus that affected his balance.

In total, Lowe played in 1254 career regular season games, scoring 84–347–431 with 1498 penalty minutes. He added another 214 playoff games, scoring 10–48–58 and earning 192 penalty minutes.

Lowe played more regular season and playoff games in an Oilers uniform than anyone in franchise history (1037 and 172). He was the team's first NHL draft pick and scored their first NHL goal (a power play goal against the Chicago Blackhawks assisted by Wayne Gretzky and Brett Callighen; Gretzky's first NHL point). Many, including Gretzky himself, believe the Great One tipped the puck on its way to the net. During his professional hockey career, Lowe did not play a single game in the minor leagues, and his teams only once failed to make the playoffs.

Lowe was named to play in the NHL All-Star Game in 1984, 1985, 1986, 1988, 1989, 1990, and 1993. He also won the league's King Clancy Memorial Trophy in 1990.

== Post-playing career ==
Lowe joined the Oilers staff in 1998 as an assistant coach. In 1999, he took over head coaching duties from Ron Low. He was head coach for just a single season, winning 32 out of 82 games (32-26-16-8), and getting the Oilers to the first round of the playoffs where they fell to the Dallas Stars in five games. He was promoted to general manager of the Oilers in 2000 when long-time GM Glen Sather left for the New York Rangers. He remained the Oilers' Executive Vice President and General Manager until the 2008–09 season when he was promoted to President of Hockey Operations.

Lowe has also been responsible for assisting Canadian national hockey teams. He was a member of the management team for the Canadian men's ice hockey team at the 2002 Winter Olympics that won the gold medal and was also named a manager for the 2004 World Cup of Hockey team. In addition, he has managed Team Canada at World Hockey Championships.

In 2005, the Quebec Major Junior Hockey League created the Kevin Lowe Trophy (Trophée Kevin Lowe), awarded annually to the player in the QMJHL judged to be the best defensive defenceman.

In the 2006–2007 NHL offseason, Lowe offered contracts to restricted free agents Thomas Vanek, which was matched by the Buffalo Sabres, then to Anaheim forward Dustin Penner, which was signed. Following the offer sheet to Penner, Brian Burke, then-GM of the Anaheim Ducks, publicly blamed Lowe for inflation in player salaries, accusing Lowe of "colossal stupidity." Then head coach Craig MacTavish responded by comparing Burke to the Wizard of Oz, "You comb his hair, put a white shirt on, wheel him out in front of the camera and he'll say whatever you guys want." Lowe did not respond to Burke's attacks until July 4, 2008, on a local radio show, Total Sports with Bob Stauffer, calling Burke a "moron" and "a media junkie."

Lowe's No. 4 was not retired by the Oilers until 2021; he had been the only player in the Oilers' NHL history to wear No. 4 until he issued it to Taylor Hall, the Oilers' first-overall draft pick in 2010. Kris Russell wore No. 4 for the Oilers as well until the beginning of the 2021-2022 season.

In 2021, Lowe was appointed to the board of directors for Play On! Canada. Play On! Canada is the world's largest road hockey tournament.

== Personal life ==
Lowe was the fourth child of Clifford and Jessie Lowe (after Carol, Nancy, and Ken). The Lowe family operated a dairy in Lachute, Quebec, and were one of the few English Catholic families in the region, with most people being francophones. Clifford was involved in operating a local hockey rink, so his children skated there from an early age, with Lowe starting when he was 3 years old.

His brother Kenneth later worked as the Head Medical Trainer of the Oilers. He is married to Canadian Olympian Karen Percy and is the father of defenceman Keegan Lowe, who was drafted by the Carolina Hurricanes in the third round, 73rd overall of the 2011 NHL entry draft. Kevin is an uncle of Melissa Lowe, a Canadian bobsleigh athlete.

== Awards and achievements ==
Lowe was named to the Hockey Hall of Fame as part of the class of 2020. Primarily a defensive defenceman during his playing career, Lowe was the first defensive defenceman named to the Hall since Rod Langway in 2002. Lowe was the final member of the Oilers' "Group of Seven" to be inducted into the Hall.

On February 26, 2021, Lowe was named to the Order of Hockey in Canada by Hockey Canada, in recognition of his career and contribution to the game in Canada.

== Career statistics ==
=== Regular season and playoffs ===
			Regular season					Playoffs
Season	Team	League	GP	G	A	Pts	PIM	GP	G	A	Pts	PIM
1976–77	Quebec Remparts	QMJHL	69	3	19	22	26	14	0	3	3	4
1977–78	Quebec Remparts	QMJHL	64	13	52	65	81	4	1	2	3	6
1978–79	Quebec Remparts	QMJHL	68	26	60	86	120	6	1	7	8	36
1979–80	Edmonton Oilers	NHL	64	2	19	21	70	3	0	1	1	0
1980–81	Edmonton Oilers	NHL	79	10	24	34	94	9	0	2	2	11
1981–82	Edmonton Oilers	NHL	80	9	31	40	63	5	0	3	3	0
1982–83	Edmonton Oilers	NHL	80	6	34	40	43	16	1	8	9	10
1983–84	Edmonton Oilers	NHL	80	4	42	46	59	19	3	7	10	16
1984–85	Edmonton Oilers	NHL	80	4	21	25	104	16	0	5	5	8
1985–86	Edmonton Oilers	NHL	74	2	16	18	90	10	1	3	4	15
1986–87	Edmonton Oilers	NHL	77	8	29	37	94	21	2	4	6	22
1987–88	Edmonton Oilers	NHL	70	9	15	24	89	19	0	2	2	26
1988–89	Edmonton Oilers	NHL	76	7	18	25	98	7	1	2	3	4
1989–90	Edmonton Oilers	NHL	78	7	26	33	140	20	0	2	2	10
1990–91	Edmonton Oilers	NHL	73	3	13	16	113	14	1	1	2	14
1991–92	Edmonton Oilers	NHL	55	2	8	10	107	11	0	3	3	16
1992–93	New York Rangers	NHL	49	3	12	15	58	—	—	—	—	—
1993–94	New York Rangers	NHL	71	5	14	19	70	22	1	0	1	20
1994–95	New York Rangers	NHL	44	1	7	8	58	10	0	1	1	12
1995–96	New York Rangers	NHL	53	1	5	6	76	10	0	4	4	4
1996–97	Edmonton Oilers	NHL	64	1	13	14	50	1	0	0	0	0
1997–98	Edmonton Oilers	NHL	7	0	0	0	0	1	0	0	0	4
NHL totals			1,254	84	347	431	1,498	214	10	48	58	192

=== International ===
Year	Team	Event	GP	G	A	Pts	PIM
1982	Canada	WC	9	1	1	2	2
1984	Canada	CC	7	0	4	4	8
Senior totals			16	1	5	6	10

== Coaching record ==
Team	Year	Regular season							Postseason			
Team	Year	G	W	L	T	OTL	Pts	Finish	W	L	Win %	Result
Edmonton Oilers	1999–00	82	32	26	16	8	88	2nd in Northwest	1	4	.200	Lost in first round (DAL)

== Awards and records ==
Award	Year(s)
Stanley Cup champion	1984, 1985, 1987, 1988 and 1990 (Edmonton), 1994 (New York Rangers)
NHL All-Star Game	1984, 1985, 1986, 1988, 1989, 1990, 1993
King Clancy Memorial Trophy	1990

=== Records ===
==== NHL ====
- Most career playoff potential series clinching games played by a defenceman (51)
- Most career shorthanded Stanley Cup Final goals (2, tied with 11 others)
- Most shorthanded goals in a Stanley Cup Final series (2, tied with 4 others, in 1987)

==== Edmonton Oilers ====
- Most career penalty minutes by a defenceman (1,236)
- Most Stanley Cups (5, tied with 5 others)
- Most career playoff games played (172)
- Most years in the playoffs (15)
- Most consecutive years in the playoffs (15)
- Most career playoff shorthanded points by a defenceman (6)
- Most career playoff shorthanded assists by a defenceman (4, tied with Charlie Huddy)

== See also ==
- List of NHL players with 1,000 games played

== Bibliography ==
- Lowe, Kevin; Fischler, Stan; Fischler, Shirley (1988), Champions: The Making Of The Edmonton Oilers, Scarborough, Ontario: Prentice-Hall, ISBN 0-132-35623-6

Preceded by Ron Areshenkoff	Edmonton Oilers first-round draft pick 1979	Succeeded by Paul Coffey
Preceded by Bryan Trottier	Winner of the King Clancy Memorial Trophy; 1990	Succeeded by Dave Taylor
Preceded by Glen Sather	General Manager of the Edmonton Oilers; 2000-08	Succeeded by Steve Tambellini
Preceded by Ron Low	Head coach of the Edmonton Oilers; 1999–2000	Succeeded by Craig MacTavish
Preceded by Mark Messier	Edmonton Oilers captain 1991–92	Succeeded by Craig MacTavish
