= Craig MacTavish =

Canadian ice hockey player and executive

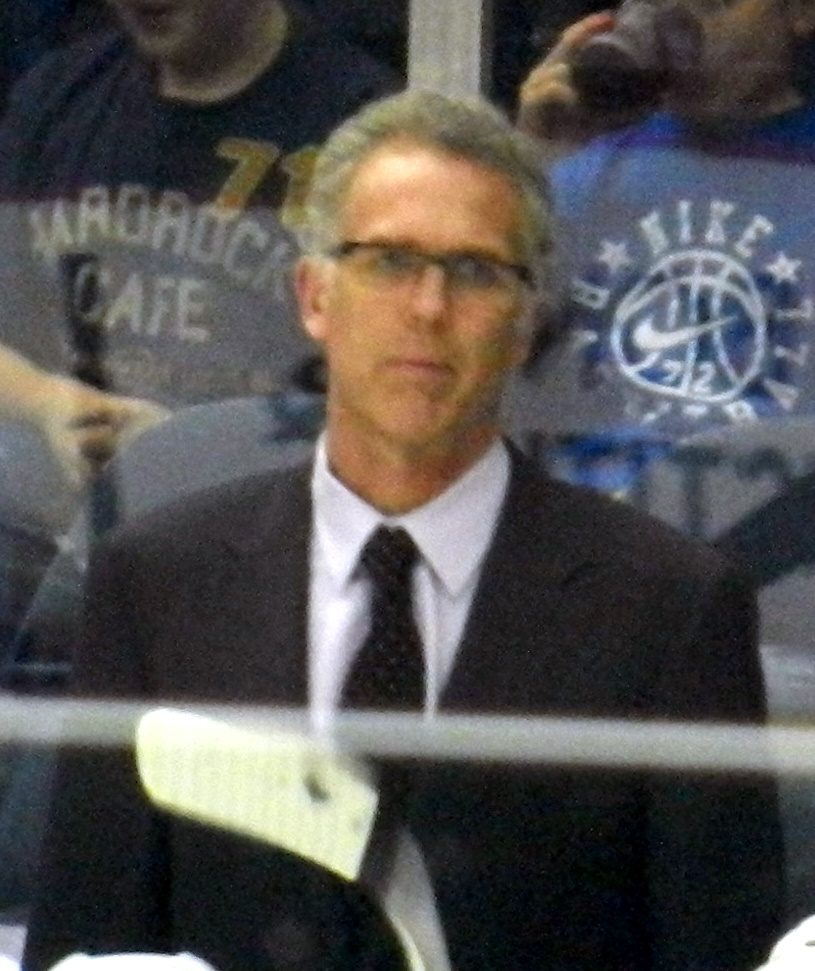
- MacTavish in 2011
- Born: August 15, 1958 (age 68) London, Ontario, Canada
- Height: 6 ft 1 in (185 cm)
- Weight: 195 lb (88 kg; 13 st 13 lb)
- Position: Centre
- Shot: Left
- Played for: Boston Bruins; Edmonton Oilers; New York Rangers; Philadelphia Flyers; St. Louis Blues
- Coached for: Edmonton Oilers; New York Rangers; Lausanne HC; Yaroslavl Lokomotiv; St. Louis Blues
- NHL draft: 153rd overall, 1978; Boston Bruins
- Playing career: 1979–1997
- Coaching career: 1997–present

Craig MacTavish (born August 15, 1958) is a Canadian professional ice hockey executive and former player, formerly an assistant coach with the St. Louis Blues. He played center for 17 seasons in the National Hockey League (NHL) with the Boston Bruins, Edmonton Oilers, New York Rangers, Philadelphia Flyers and St. Louis Blues, winning the Stanley Cup four times (1987, 1988, 1990, 1994). He was the last NHL player not to wear a helmet during games.

MacTavish later coached the Oilers from 2000 to 2009 and also served as assistant coach with the Rangers and Oilers. He last coached Team Canada at the 2019 Spengler Cup, after a short stint with Russian team Lokomotiv Yaroslavl of the KHL. He served as an assistant coach with the St. Louis Blues from 2022 to 2023.

== Early life and education ==
MacTavish was born on August 15, 1958, in London, Ontario.

After retiring as NHL player in 1997, MacTavish was accepted as an MBA student at the University of Alberta. He didn't start the program, following the decision to take a coaching position with the New York Rangers. In 2011, he obtained an EMBA from Queen's School of Business.

== Career ==
=== Early career ===
MacTavish played two years of NCAA hockey with the University of Lowell Chiefs (now University of Massachusetts Lowell River Hawks) from 1977 to 1979. He was drafted by the Boston Bruins in the 1978 NHL entry draft with their ninth pick, 153rd overall, and spent the next several years splitting time between the Bruins and various American Hockey League teams. He finally made the Bruins for good in 1982–83 and played two full seasons with them.

During his early days with the Bruins, the young MacTavish was involved in the infamous brawl between several Boston players and a group of New York Rangers fans in 1979.

MacTavish missed the 1984–85 season after being convicted of vehicular homicide, having struck and killed a young woman while he was driving under the influence of alcohol. MacTavish pleaded guilty to vehicular homicide and driving under the influence of alcohol the night of January 25, 1984, in Peabody, Massachusetts. Kim Radley, 26, of West Newfield, Maine, died four days later of injuries sustained in the crash. MacTavish was sentenced to a year's imprisonment for the offence.

=== Later career ===
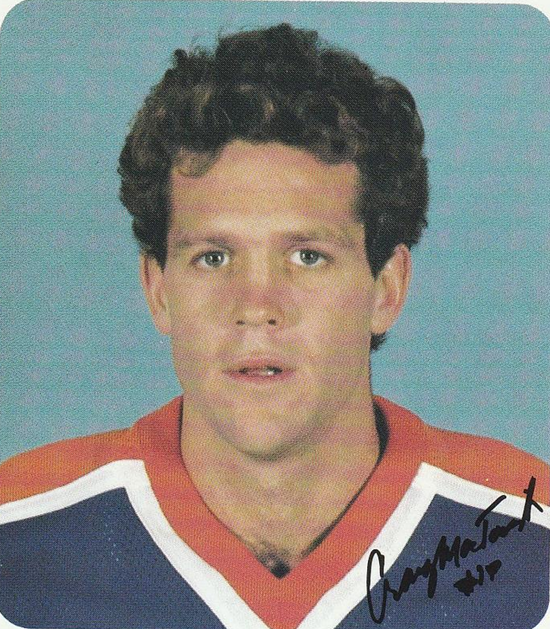
Craig MacTavish in 1985-86 card for Edmonton Oilers

Widely viewed, at the time, as a personal favour from Edmonton coach Glen Sather to his best friend, then-Bruins general manager Harry Sinden (who felt that MacTavish ought to have a fresh start away from Boston and had offered to let him out of his contract, which MacTavish had accepted), the Oilers took a chance on MacTavish and signed him for the 1985–86 season. Sather's intuition turned out to be good, as MacTavish spent eight full seasons with the Oilers, helping them to win three Stanley Cups in 1987, 1988, 1990 and serving as team captain from 1992 to 1994. MacTavish was traded to the New York Rangers in 1994, just in time to help several other former Oilers (including Kevin Lowe, Glenn Anderson, Adam Graves, Jeff Beukeboom, Esa Tikkanen and Mark Messier) win the Stanley Cup.

The next season MacTavish signed with the Philadelphia Flyers as a free agent, and was traded to the St. Louis Blues during the 1995–96 season. MacTavish retired following the 1996–97 season. He was the last helmetless player, having signed a professional contract with the Bruins before the mandatory cutoff date in 1979 (then-current players were allowed to remain bare-headed under a grandfather clause); incidentally, MacTavish had worn a helmet in his earliest days as he can be seen wearing one during the aforementioned fight with Rangers fans in 1979.

=== Coaching career ===
MacTavish turned to coaching immediately after retiring as a player, signing on as an assistant with the Rangers. After two seasons in New York, he returned to the Oilers as an assistant coach in the 1999–2000 season under former teammate Kevin Lowe. He was subsequently promoted to the top job when Lowe succeeded Sather as general manager.

In the 2005–06 season, MacTavish led the Oilers on their run to the Stanley Cup Final. In the first round of the playoffs, MacTavish shocked the hockey world by utilizing a trapping defensive system to neutralize a potent Detroit Red Wings offence. The Oilers were able to deny scoring chances by blocking shots with their bodies—something for which MacTavish was known during his playing career. This proved effective; the eighth-seeded Oilers won the opening round in six games, against the no. 1 seed, the Detroit Red Wings for their first postseason victory since 1998. Along the way the Oilers defeated the San Jose Sharks in six games and the Mighty Ducks of Anaheim in five games to advance to their first Stanley Cup since their championship season of 1990. However, the Oilers could not complete their run, losing a thrilling seven-game final series to the Carolina Hurricanes after nearly rallying from a 3–1 series deficit to force a game seven. As it would turn out, this was the only season in MacTavish's tenure where the Oilers won a postseason series.

On November 4, 2006, one day after the Oilers lost to the Dallas Stars due to an apparent blown call in the last five seconds of the third period by referee Mick McGeough, MacTavish was fined $10,000 for expressing his anger after the game, referring to the call as "retarded". After this incident, Oilers fans collected over $10,000 and gave it to MacTavish, who subsequently donated the money to charity.

On April 15, 2009, Oilers general manager Steve Tambellini announced that MacTavish had been relieved of his duties as head coach of the club. The Oilers had failed to reach the playoffs for the third year in a row. He finished his tenure with the Oilers at 36th on the all-time NHL list with 301 wins, and second on the Oilers' all-time wins list behind only Sather.

During the 2011–12 season, MacTavish coached the Chicago Wolves, the American Hockey League affiliate of the Vancouver Canucks. After the season, MacTavish left the Canucks organization, returned to the Oilers as senior vice-president of hockey operations and was named general manager on April 15, 2013.

On December 15, 2014, MacTavish fired head coach Dallas Eakins from his duties as head coach of the Oilers. MacTavish named himself as interim coach with the intention of transitioning minor league coach Todd Nelson into the role of interim head coach in the near future.

On May 16, 2019, he returned to coaching, signing a two-year contract with the Russian KHL team Lokomotiv Yaroslavl. On September 24, 2019, it was announced that Lokomotiv Yaroslav fired MacTavish after only eight games. In December 2019, he served as head coach of Team Canada and led the squad to the title at the Spengler Cup. He took over the head coaching job at Swiss team Lausanne HC on February 27, 2020.

On July 1, 2022, MacTavish was hired by the St. Louis Blues as an assistant coach for the 2022-2023 season, after the Boston Bruins acquired Jim Montgomery as their head coach. In April 2023, the Blues announced that MacTavish, along with fellow assistant coach Mike Van Ryn, would not return for the next season.

=== TSN commentator ===
Failing to be picked up by another team in the coaching department, on September 21, 2009, MacTavish began the first of twenty-five in-studio appearances with TSN as a hockey commentator.

=== Management career ===
On June 11, 2012, Edmonton Oilers general manager Steve Tambellini announced that McTavish was added to the club's hockey operations management team as senior vice-president of hockey operations.

On April 15, 2013, general manager Steve Tambellini was relieved of his position, and the Oilers named MacTavish as the new general manager. Former Columbus Blue Jackets GM Scott Howson replaced MacTavish as the vice-president of hockey operations.

On April 24, 2015, Oilers Entertainment Group CEO, Bob Nicholson announced that Peter Chiarelli had been hired as the new general manager and president of hockey operations. Nicholson did not provide details on what MacTavish's new position would be within the Oilers organization.

On September 12, 2015, general manager Peter Chiarelli revealed in an interview with TSN's Bob McKenzie that MacTavish had been given the title of vice-president of hockey operations; most of his duties would circulate around the Oilers' new affiliate team the Bakersfield Condors, his other main focus will be on pro scouting.

== Personal life ==
MacTavish and his wife Debbie have a daughter and two sons.

While playing with the Flyers, MacTavish was a resident of Voorhees Township, New Jersey.

== Career statistics ==
=== Regular season and playoffs ===
			Regular season					Playoffs
Season	Team	League	GP	G	A	Pts	PIM	GP	G	A	Pts	PIM
1977–78	University of Lowell	ECAC II	24	26	19	45	—	—	—	—	—	—
1978–79	University of Lowell	ECAC II	31	36	52	88	—	—	—	—	—	—
1979–80	Binghamton Dusters	AHL	34	17	15	32	20	—	—	—	—	—
1979–80	Boston Bruins	NHL	46	11	17	28	8	10	2	3	5	7
1980–81	Springfield Indians	AHL	53	19	24	43	89	7	5	4	9	8
1980–81	Boston Bruins	NHL	24	3	5	8	13	—	—	—	—	—
1981–82	Erie Blades	AHL	72	23	32	55	37	—	—	—	—	—
1981–82	Boston Bruins	NHL	2	0	1	1	0	—	—	—	—	—
1982–83	Boston Bruins	NHL	75	10	20	30	18	17	3	1	4	18
1983–84	Boston Bruins	NHL	70	20	23	43	35	1	0	0	0	0
1985–86	Edmonton Oilers	NHL	74	23	24	47	70	10	4	4	8	11
1986–87	Edmonton Oilers	NHL	79	20	19	39	55	21	1	9	10	16
1987–88	Edmonton Oilers	NHL	80	15	17	32	47	19	0	1	1	31
1988–89	Edmonton Oilers	NHL	80	21	31	52	55	7	0	1	1	8
1989–90	Edmonton Oilers	NHL	80	21	22	43	89	22	2	6	8	29
1990–91	Edmonton Oilers	NHL	80	17	15	32	76	18	3	3	6	20
1991–92	Edmonton Oilers	NHL	80	12	18	30	98	16	3	0	3	28
1992–93	Edmonton Oilers	NHL	82	10	20	30	110	—	—	—	—	—
1993–94	Edmonton Oilers	NHL	66	16	10	26	80	—	—	—	—	—
1993–94	New York Rangers	NHL	12	4	2	6	11	23	1	4	5	22
1994–95	Philadelphia Flyers	NHL	45	3	9	12	23	15	1	4	5	20
1995–96	Philadelphia Flyers	NHL	55	5	8	13	62	—	—	—	—	—
1995–96	St. Louis Blues	NHL	13	0	1	1	8	13	0	2	2	6
1996–97	St. Louis Blues	NHL	50	2	5	7	33	1	0	0	0	2
NHL totals			1,093	213	267	480	891	193	20	38	58	218

== Head coaching record ==
Team	Year	Regular season							Postseason			
Team	Year	G	W	L	T	OTL	Pts	Finish	W	L	Win %	Result
EDM	2000–01	82	39	28	12	3	93	2nd in Northwest	2	4	.333	Lost in conference quarterfinals (DAL)
EDM	2001–02	82	38	28	12	4	92	3rd in Northwest	–	–	–	Missed playoffs
EDM	2002–03	82	36	26	11	9	92	4th in Northwest	2	4	.333	Lost in conference quarterfinals (DAL)
EDM	2003–04	82	36	29	12	5	89	4th in Northwest	–	–	–	Missed playoffs
EDM	2005–06	82	41	28	–	13	95	3rd in Northwest	15	9	.625	Lost in Stanley Cup Final (CAR)
EDM	2006–07	82	32	43	–	7	71	5th in Northwest	–	–	–	Missed playoffs
EDM	2007–08	82	41	35	–	6	88	4th in Northwest	–	–	–	Missed playoffs
EDM	2008–09	82	38	35	–	9	85	4th in Northwest	–	–	–	Missed playoffs
Career total		656	301	252	47	56	694		19	17	.528	3 playoff appearances

== Awards and achievements ==
- 1979 – Most Outstanding Player of the NCAA Division II Men's Ice Hockey Championship
- 1986–87 – Stanley Cup (Edmonton)
- 1987–88 – Stanley Cup (Edmonton)
- 1989–90 – Stanley Cup (Edmonton)
- 1993–94 – Stanley Cup (New York)
- 1995–96 – played in NHL All-Star Game

== See also ==
- List of NHL players with 1,000 games played

== Notes ==
Awards and achievements
Preceded by Jim Toomey	NCAA Tournament Most Outstanding Player; 1979	Succeeded by Steve Carroll
Sporting positions
Preceded by Steve Tambellini	General manager of the Edmonton Oilers; 2013–2015	Succeeded by Peter Chiarelli
Preceded by Kevin Lowe	Head coach of the Edmonton Oilers; 2000–09	Succeeded by Pat Quinn
Preceded by Kevin Lowe	Edmonton Oilers captain 1992–94	Succeeded by Shayne Corson
