= Steve Tambellini =

Canadian ice hockey player

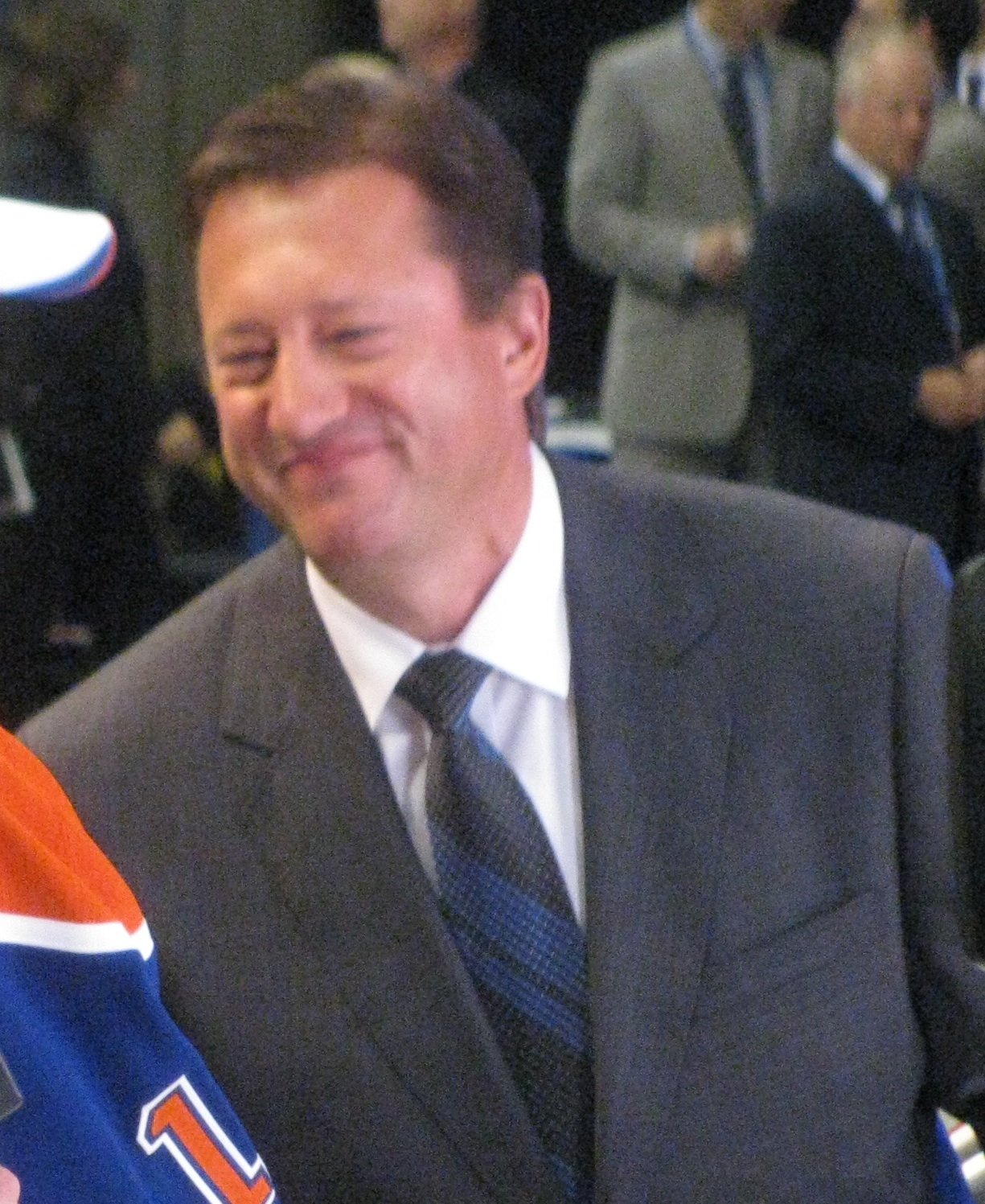
- Steve Tambellini at the 2010 NHL Entry Draft
- Born: May 14, 1958 (age 68) Trail, British Columbia, Canada
- Height: 6 ft 0 in (183 cm)
- Weight: 185 lb (84 kg; 13 st 3 lb)
- Position: Centre
- Shot: Left
- Played for: New York Islanders; Colorado Rockies; New Jersey Devils; Calgary Flames; Vancouver Canucks
- National team: Canada
- NHL draft: 15th overall, 1978; New York Islanders
- Playing career: 1978–1988

Steven Anthony Tambellini (born May 14, 1958) is a Canadian former ice hockey player and former general manager for the Edmonton Oilers (July 2008 – April 2013). He is currently a scout for the Anaheim Ducks.

== Playing career ==
Steve Tambellini played his junior hockey for the Lethbridge Broncos of the WCHL from the 1975–76 season until the 1977–78 season, where he scored 155 goals and notched 181 assists in 193 games. He earned the WCHL Rookie of the Year for his effort in the 1975–76 season.

In the 1978 NHL Entry Draft, Tambellini was chosen 15th overall by the New York Islanders. He spent two years with New York, winning a Stanley Cup with them in the 1980 season. He was dealt at the trade deadline the next season along with Chico Resch to the Colorado Rockies in exchange for Mike McEwen. He stayed with Colorado for two seasons, including their first season as the New Jersey Devils as the franchise was relocated in 1982. Tambellini scored the Devils' first hat trick on December 3, 1982, in a 5–4 victory over Hartford. After the 1982–83 season, Steve was traded to the Calgary Flames. He remained there for two seasons before signing as a free agent with the Vancouver Canucks, where he rounded out his NHL career.

He went on to play a minor amount of time in both the Swiss Hockey League and the Austrian Hockey League.

=== International play ===
During his career, Steve Tambellini represented Canada on three occasions: In 1978 he played for Team Canada in the World Junior Hockey Championship, winning a bronze medal after scoring two goals and two assists. He played in the World Hockey Championship as well as the 1988 Winter Olympics in Calgary, Alberta, Canada, where he scored a goal and three assists.

== After retirement ==
After his retirement from hockey, he was hired by the Canucks as the director of public and media relations and remained with the franchise until July 2008. In 1997, he would be promoted to senior vice-president of hockey operations. In 1998 his position would change again, this time to the vice-president of player personnel. In this position he would oversee player development and professional player scouting, until eventually being named assistant general manager to Dave Nonis and to Mike Gillis after Nonis was fired by the Canucks on April 14, 2008.

In 2002, he was the director of player personnel for the gold medal winning Canadian Olympic Men's Ice Hockey Team at the 2002 Winter Olympics. He would be rewarded again, being named the director of player personnel for both the 2003 World Junior Ice Hockey Championships as well as the 2004 World Cup of Hockey.

In 2004, he was inducted into the British Columbia Hockey Hall of Fame.

On July 31, 2008, he was named general manager of the Edmonton Oilers after the Oilers promoted Kevin Lowe to president of hockey operations.

On April 13, 2013, he was fired by the Edmonton Oilers, and was replaced by Craig MacTavish. The Anaheim Ducks hired Tambellini as a part-time scout on November 21, 2013.

== Personal life ==
His father, Addie Tambellini, helped the Trail Smoke Eaters win the 1961 World Ice Hockey Championships, the last Canadian amateur team to do so. His oldest son, Jeff Tambellini, was drafted 27th overall by the Los Angeles Kings in the 2003 NHL Entry Draft. Jeff is now following in his grandfather's foot steps becoming the head coach and general manager of the Trail Smoke Eaters of the BCHL in 2018. His youngest son Adam Tambellini, was drafted by the New York Rangers 65th overall in the 2013 NHL Draft and currently plays for HC Davos of the Swiss National League.

== Career statistics ==
=== Regular season and playoffs ===
			Regular season					Playoffs
Season	Team	League	GP	G	A	Pts	PIM	GP	G	A	Pts	PIM
1974–75	Trail Smoke Eaters	KIJHL	33	52	53	105	30	—	—	—	—	—
1975–76	Lethbridge Broncos	WCHL	72	38	59	97	42	7	3	6	9	2
1976–77	Lethbridge Broncos	WCHL	55	42	42	84	23	15	10	11	21	0
1977–78	Lethbridge Broncos	WCHL	66	75	80	155	32	8	10	5	15	5
1978–79	New York Islanders	NHL	1	0	0	0	0	—	—	—	—	—
1978–79	Fort Worth Texans	CHL	73	25	27	52	32	5	0	1	1	0
1979–80	New York Islanders	NHL	45	5	8	13	4	—	—	—	—	—
1980–81	New York Islanders	NHL	61	19	17	36	17	—	—	—	—	—
1980–81	Colorado Rockies	NHL	13	6	12	18	2	—	—	—	—	—
1981–82	Colorado Rockies	NHL	79	29	30	59	14	—	—	—	—	—
1982–83	New Jersey Devils	NHL	73	25	18	43	14	—	—	—	—	—
1983–84	Calgary Flames	NHL	73	15	10	25	16	2	0	1	1	0
1984–85	Moncton Golden Flames	AHL	7	2	5	7	0	—	—	—	—	—
1984–85	Calgary Flames	NHL	47	19	10	29	4	—	—	—	—	—
1985–86	Vancouver Canucks	NHL	48	15	15	30	12	—	—	—	—	—
1986–87	Vancouver Canucks	NHL	72	16	20	36	14	—	—	—	—	—
1987–88	Canadian National Team	Intl	10	2	3	5	2	—	—	—	—	—
1987–88	Vancouver Canucks	NHL	41	11	10	21	8	—	—	—	—	—
1988–89	ZSC Lions	CHE.2	34	39	24	63	14	8	4	9	13	4
1989–90	EC VSV	AUT	36	44	37	81	34	—	—	—	—	—
NHL totals			553	160	150	310	105	2	0	1	1	0

=== International ===
Year	Team	Event	GP	G	A	Pts	PIM
1978	Canada	WJC	6	2	2	4	0
1981	Canada	WC	8	0	3	3	4
1988	Canada	OLY	8	1	3	4	2
Junior totals			6	2	2	4	0
Senior totals			16	1	6	7	6

Preceded by Mike Bossy	New York Islanders first-round draft pick 1978	Succeeded by Duane Sutter
Preceded by Kevin Lowe	General manager of the Edmonton Oilers; 2008–13	Succeeded by Craig MacTavish
