= Addie Tambellini =

Canadian ice hockey player (1936–2004)

- Born: February 4, 1936 Trail, British Columbia, Canada
- Died: February 23, 2004 (aged 68)
- Height: 5 ft 10 in (178 cm)
- Weight: 168 lb (76 kg; 12 st 0 lb)
- Position: Forward
- Played for: Calgary Stampeders; Trail Smoke Eaters; Seattle Totems; EC KAC
- National team: Canada
- Playing career: 1957–1967

Medal record

Representing Canada

Men's ice hockey

Ice Hockey World Championships
Bronze medal – third place	1967 Ice Hockey World Championships	
Gold medal – first place	1961 Ice Hockey World Championships	

Adolph Tambellini (February 4, 1936 – February 23, 2004) was a Canadian ice hockey player.

== Career ==
Born in Trail, British Columbia, Tambellini played junior hockey with the Lethbridge Native Sons before playing professionally for the Calgary Stampeders, Trail Smoke Eaters and Seattle Totems as well as a spell in Austria for EC KAC.

Internationally, Tambellini was a member of the gold-medal-winning Smoke Eaters team that won the 1961 World Ice Hockey Championships – the last amateur team from Canada to do so.

== Family ==
His son, Steve Tambellini, played in the National Hockey League (NHL) and later became an executive for the Vancouver Canucks and general manager for the Edmonton Oilers. His grandson, Jeff Tambellini, also became a player in the NHL and his youngest grandson Adam Tambellini was drafted in the 2013 NHL entry draft, 65th overall, by the New York Rangers.
