= Jeff Tambellini =

Canadian ice hockey player (born 1984)

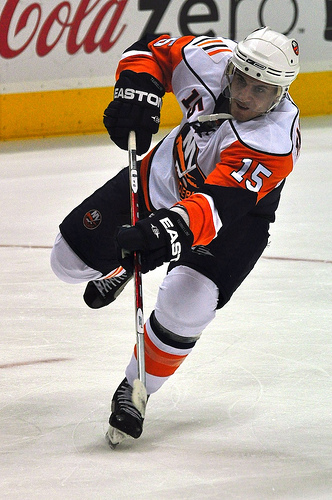
- Tambellini with the New York Islanders in 2008
- Born: April 13, 1984 (age 42) Calgary, Alberta, Canada
- Height: 5 ft 11 in (180 cm)
- Weight: 192 lb (87 kg; 13 st 10 lb)
- Position: Left wing
- Shot: Left
- Played for: Los Angeles Kings; New York Islanders; Vancouver Canucks; ZSC Lions; Modo Hockey; HC Fribourg-Gottéron; Växjö Lakers; Djurgårdens IF
- NHL draft: 27th overall, 2003; Los Angeles Kings
- Playing career: 2005–2017

Jeff Tambellini (born April 13, 1984) is a Canadian former professional ice hockey player and current Assistant General Manager and Director of Hockey Operations for Tampa Bay Lightning of the National Hockey League (NHL). A winger, he was originally selected 27th overall by the Los Angeles Kings in the 2003 NHL entry draft and joined the NHL in 2005. During his rookie season, he was traded to the New York Islanders. He split his first three professional seasons between the NHL and his clubs' American Hockey League (AHL) affiliates, the Manchester Monarchs (Los Angeles) and Bridgeport Sound Tigers (New York). In July 2010, Tambellini signed with the Vancouver Canucks and spent a season with the organization.

During his junior career, Tambellini earned MVP honours in the British Columbia Hockey League (BCHL), while also leading the Chilliwack Chiefs to a Fred Page Cup as league champions and a Doyle Cup as Pacific regional champions. In 2002, he joined the college ranks with the Michigan Wolverines of the Central Collegiate Hockey Association (CCHA). Over three seasons, he won two Mason Cups with Michigan as CCHA champions, while earning several individual honours, including league rookie of the year in 2003 and playoff MVP in 2005. Internationally, he competed for Canada's under-20 team at the 2004 World Junior Championships, earning a silver medal.

== Playing career ==
=== Junior and college ===
Tambellini played one season in the third-tier Pacific International Junior Hockey League (PIJHL) with the Port Coquitlam Buckaroos in 1999–2000. He scored 31 goals and 64 points over 41 games, earning PIJHL First Team All-Star and Rookie of the Year honours. The following season, he joined the Junior A ranks with the Chilliwack Chiefs of the British Columbia Hockey League (BCHL), recording 51 points over 54 games in his rookie season.

In 2001–02, he improved to 117 points (46 goals and 71 points), receiving the Brett Hull Trophy as the league's leading scorer along with Matt Ellison of the Cowichan Valley Capitals, who also scored 117 points. He was further distinguished with the Verne Dye Memorial Trophy as the Coastal Conference's most valuable player. Tambellini went on to help the Chiefs to a Fred Page Cup as league champions, defeating the Vernon Vipers four games to two in the finals. Advancing to the Doyle Cup, the Chiefs beat the Alberta Junior Hockey League (AJHL) champion Drayton Valley Thunder by the same series score to capture the regional title. Competing for the Canadian Junior Hockey League (CJHL) title, Chilliwack lost in the Royal Bank Cup semifinals. During the tournament, Tambellini was chosen as the CJHL player of the year, beating out Jade Galbraith of the Drayton Valley Thunder and Tim Vokey of the Cornwall Colts.

Tambellini left the Chiefs after two seasons to play college hockey with the Michigan Wolverines of the Central Collegiate Hockey Association (CCHA), where he served as an alternate captain. After scoring 45 points over 43 games in his freshman year, he received All-Rookie Team, Second All-Star Team and Rookie of the Year honours in the CCHA. In the playoffs, Tambellini helped the Wolverines to his first of two Mason Cups in his college career as CCHA champions.

Going into the 2003 NHL entry draft, he was ranked 21st among North American skaters by the NHL Central Scouting Bureau. Scouts listed him as a superior skater and defensively responsible with leadership qualities. He went on to be selected in the first round, 27th overall, by the Los Angeles Kings.

Returning to Michigan following his draft, his offensive production declined to 27 points over 39 games. The Wolverines returned to the CCHA finals, but were defeated by the Ohio State Buckeyes. Returning to form in 2004–05, Tambellini notched 24 goals and 57 points over 42 games, earning CCHA First All-Star Team honours. He led the Wolverines to a second Mason Cup championship in three years and was chosen as the CCHA Tournament MVP. Competing in the NCAA tournament, Tambellini was named to the NCAA Midwest Regional All-Tournament and NCAA West Second All-Star Teams.

=== Professional ===
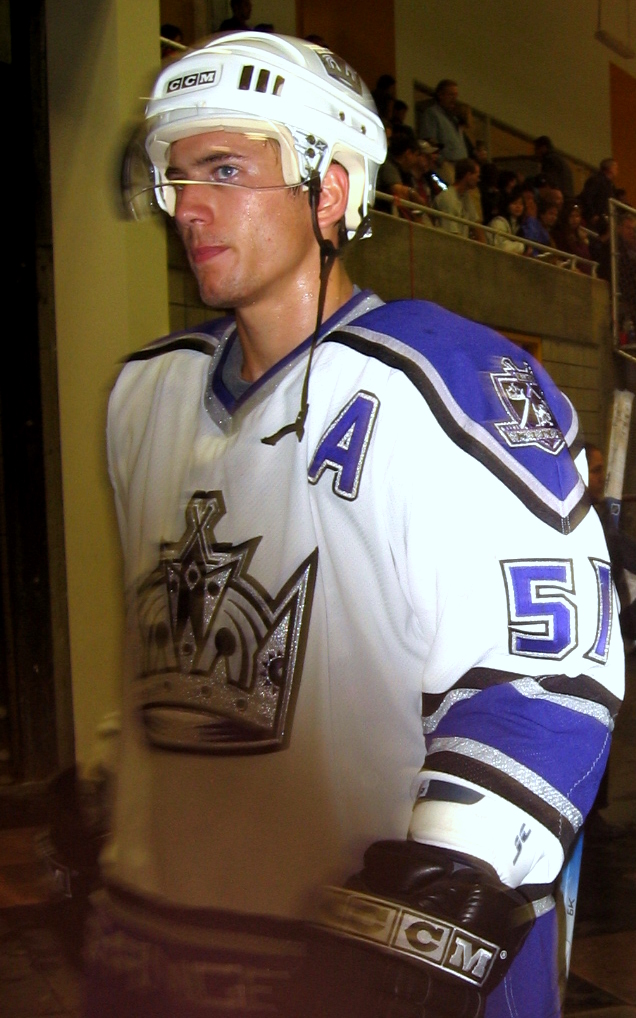
Tambellini with the Kings during exhibition play in September 2005

On August 15, 2005, Tambellini signed an entry-level contract with the Kings, foregoing his senior year with Michigan. In late-September, he was assigned to their American Hockey League (AHL) affiliate, the Manchester Monarchs, following his training camp with Los Angeles. Two months into the season, Tambellini was called up to the Kings, making his NHL debut on November 30, 2005, against the Chicago Blackhawks. The Kings lost the game 3–2, while Tambellini earned nine minutes of ice time. After four pointless NHL games, he was sent back down to Manchester. On March 8, 2006, Tambellini was traded by the Kings, along with defenceman Denis Grebeshkov, to the New York Islanders, in exchange for forward Mark Parrish and defenceman Brent Sopel. Upon being dealt, he was called up from the AHL and played the remainder of the season with New York. He left Manchester with 25 goals and 56 points in 56 games, which finished the 2005–06 AHL season ranked as the third-best points-per-game rate among league rookies.

Playing in his third game with the Islanders, he scored his first NHL goal against Martin Brodeur in a 6–1 win against the New Jersey Devils on March 14, 2006. He finished the campaign with a goal and four points in 21 games with New York. As the Islanders failed to qualify for the playoffs, they assigned Tambellini to their AHL affiliate, the Bridgeport Sound Tigers, for their Calder Cup playoffs. Over seven post-season games, he recorded three points as Bridgeport was eliminated by the Wilkes-Barre/Scranton Penguins in the first round.

Tambellini split the 2006–07 season between the Islanders and Sound Tigers. Called up from the AHL on three separate occasions, he recorded two goals and nine points over 23 games with New York. Over 50 AHL games, he led the Sound Tigers with 30 goals and 59 points. The following season, Tambellini set the Sound Tigers single-season scoring record with 76 points in 57 games. His 38 goals ranked second in the league, while his points total was seventh. He was called up to the NHL five times, scoring a goal and four points over 31 games. In the off-season, he was re-signed to a two-year, US$1.175 million contract on July 16, 2008.

In 2008–09, he began the campaign in the NHL. With the exception of a two-week assignment with Bridgeport in December 2008, he spent the entire season with the Islanders. Over 65 NHL games, he scored seven goals and 15 points, while recording three goals in six games with the Sound Tigers. The following season, Tambellini recorded his first NHL hat trick with his father in attendance on October 31, 2009, against the Buffalo Sabres. Often made a healthy scratch, he completed the season with 14 points over 36 games, while leading the Islanders in shootout percentage with three goals in five attempts.

Becoming an unrestricted free agent in the off-season, Tambellini joined the Vancouver Canucks on July 1, 2010. He signed a one-year, two-way deal paying the league-minimum $500,000 at the NHL-level and $105,000 at the minor-league level. He had received interest from other teams, but was quick to accept an offer from his hometown NHL team, commenting that he "grew up want[ing] to be part of the Vancouver Canucks from age six." Tambellini scored his first goal as a Canuck on October 22, 2010, in a 5–1 win against the Minnesota Wild. While earning some time on the team's second line, he played the majority of the season on the fourth unit, finishing with 9 goals and 17 points over 62 games. Assigned to the team's AHL affiliate for brief periods in October and November 2010, he recorded 7 points over 7 games with the Manitoba Moose. A healthy scratch for the majority of the 2011 playoffs, he made his NHL post-season debut in Game 6 of the second round against the Nashville Predators. In total, he dressed in six games with no points during the playoffs as the Canucks advanced to the Stanley Cup Finals for the third time in team history, losing in Game 7 to the Boston Bruins. Tambellini was the last player to wear sweater #10 for the Canucks, prior to it being retired in honor of Pavel Bure.

After becoming an unrestricted free agent once more in the off-season, Tambellini signed for the ZSC Lions of the National League A (NLA) in Switzerland. By joining Zurich, he followed after his father and grandfather, who both played for the team during their careers. He was recruited to play overseas by the Lions' Bob Hartley, who previously coached in the NHL for the Colorado Avalanche and Atlanta Thrashers. Tambellini became the team's premiere player in his first season with Zurich, leading the team in scoring and averaging more than 25 minutes a game. He described the Swiss league as a competitive level between the AHL and NHL. In his first season in Zurich, he won the Swiss Championship.

Upon completion of an injury plagued second season with the Lions, Tambellini left as a free agent and signed a one-year contract in Sweden with Modo Hockey of the Swedish Hockey League on March 25, 2013.

In the 2014–15 season, Tambellini skated in 30 games with Fribourg-Gotteron of the Swiss-A league, registering five goals and 13 points. He also played in 20 games with Växjö Lakers in the Swedish Hockey League, recording six goals and nine points. On July 5, 2015, the Tampa Bay Lightning signed Tambellini to a one-year, two-way contract.

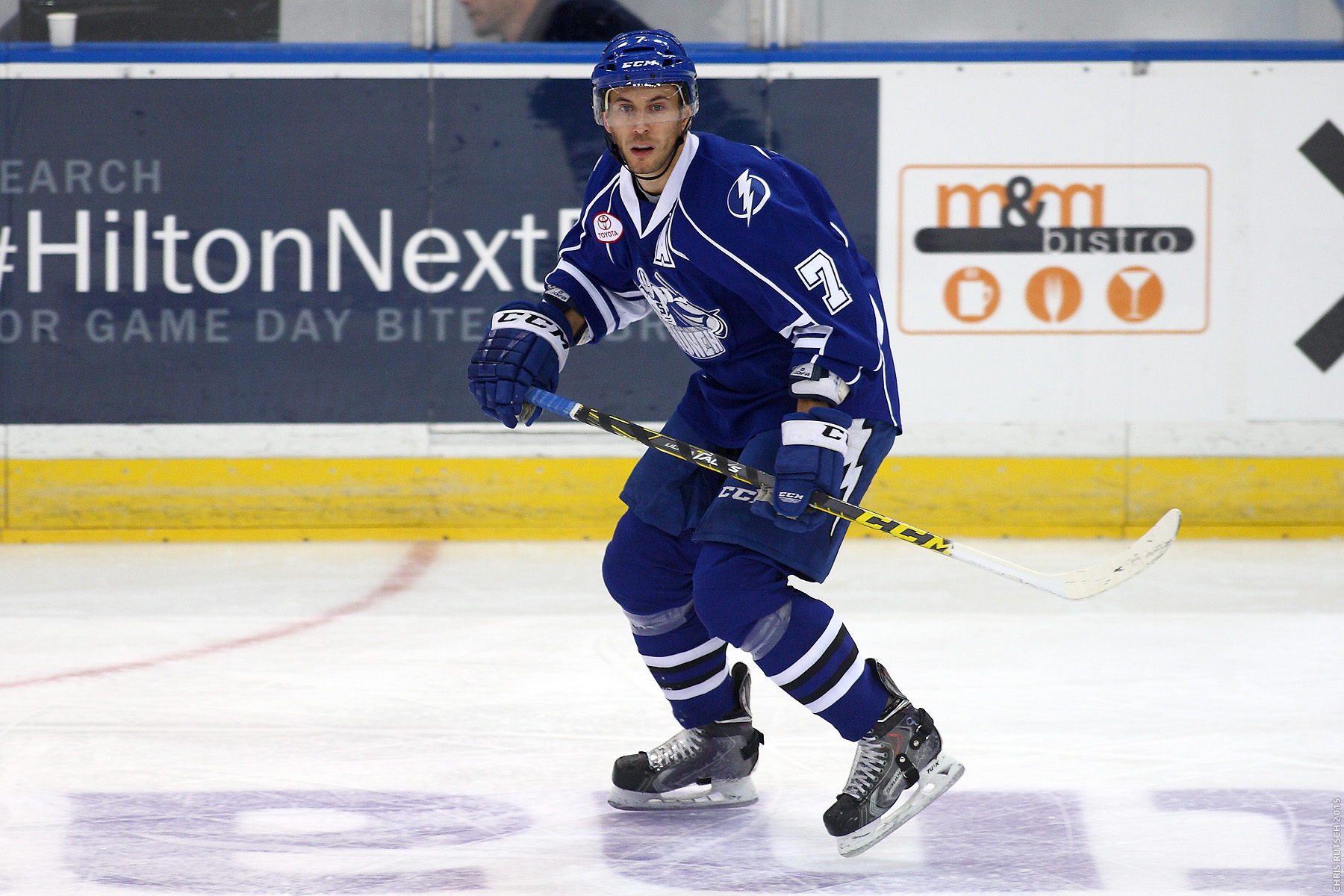
Tambellini with the Syracuse Crunch in 2015

After spending the 2015–16 season with the Lightning's AHL affiliate, the Syracuse Crunch, in which he contributed with 49 points in 65 games, Tambellini returned to Sweden in securing a one-year contract with Djurgårdens IF of the SHL on June 10, 2016. Tambellini left Djurgården in February, 2017, having failed to make a significant impact at Djurgården by producing only 4 goals and 5 assists in 41 games. He subsequently rejoined his former team Växjö Lakers, with whom he had won the Le Mat Trophy in 2015.

At the conclusion of the 2016–17 season, Tambellini ended his 12-year professional career, announcing his retirement while returning as an undergraduate at the University of Michigan to complete his degree. He was also announced as the Wolverines' assistant coach.

== International play ==
Medal record

Representing Canada

World Junior Championships
Silver medal – second place	2004 Finland	

Representing Canada Pacific

World U-17 Hockey Challenge
Silver medal – second place	2004 New Glasgow	

Tambellini competed for the Canadian national junior team at the 2004 World Junior Championships, held in Finland. He was the lone NCAA player on Canada's roster. Playing against Ukraine in the round-robin, he scored his first international goal in a 10–0 win. Helping Canada reach the gold medal game, they lost to the United States by a 4–3 score, earning silver. In six games, Tambellini recorded two goals and five points, ranking sixth in team scoring.

== Personal life ==
Tambellini was born in Calgary, Alberta. His brother Adam Tambellini also plays ice hockey. His father Steve Tambellini, a former ice hockey player and former general manager of the Edmonton Oilers, was playing for the Calgary Flames at the time. Steve also played in the NHL with the New York Islanders, Colorado Rockies, New Jersey Devils and Vancouver Canucks. Tambellini's grandfather, Addie Tambellini, was a member of the Trail Smoke Eaters who were the last Canadian amateur team to win the World Championships in 1961. Tambellini became the second member of his family to serve as the head coach and general manager of the Trail Smoke Eaters. While his father became involved with the Canucks first as a player, then as an executive later in his career, Jeff lived in suburban Port Moody, British Columbia, gaining exposure to the NHL environment.

== Career statistics ==
=== Regular season and playoffs ===
			Regular season					Playoffs
Season	Team	League	GP	G	A	Pts	PIM	GP	G	A	Pts	PIM
1999–2000	Port Coquitlam Buckaroos	PIJHL	41	30	34	64	—	—	—	—	—	—
2000–01	Chilliwack Chiefs	BCHL	54	21	30	51	13	—	—	—	—	—
2001–02	Chilliwack Chiefs	BCHL	34	46	71	117	23	—	—	—	—	—
2002–03	Michigan Wolverines	CCHA	43	26	19	45	24	—	—	—	—	—
2003–04	Michigan Wolverines	CCHA	39	15	12	27	18	—	—	—	—	—
2004–05	Michigan Wolverines	CCHA	42	24	33	57	32	—	—	—	—	—
2005–06	Manchester Monarchs	AHL	56	25	31	56	26	—	—	—	—	—
2005–06	Los Angeles Kings	NHL	4	0	0	0	2	—	—	—	—	—
2005–06	New York Islanders	NHL	21	1	3	4	8	—	—	—	—	—
2005–06	Bridgeport Sound Tigers	AHL	—	—	—	—	—	7	1	2	3	2
2006–07	New York Islanders	NHL	23	2	7	9	6	—	—	—	—	—
2006–07	Bridgeport Sound Tigers	AHL	50	30	29	59	46	—	—	—	—	—
2007–08	New York Islanders	NHL	31	1	3	4	8	—	—	—	—	—
2007–08	Bridgeport Sound Tigers	AHL	57	38	38	76	38	—	—	—	—	—
2008–09	New York Islanders	NHL	65	7	8	15	32	—	—	—	—	—
2008–09	Bridgeport Sound Tigers	AHL	6	3	0	3	2	—	—	—	—	—
2009–10	New York Islanders	NHL	36	7	7	14	14	—	—	—	—	—
2010–11	Manitoba Moose	AHL	7	5	2	7	0	—	—	—	—	—
2010–11	Vancouver Canucks	NHL	62	9	8	17	18	6	0	0	0	2
2011–12	ZSC Lions	NLA	50	23	22	45	24	13	3	7	10	2
2012–13	ZSC Lions	NLA	27	5	7	12	14	—	—	—	—	—
2013–14	Modo Hockey	SHL	45	13	7	20	32	—	—	—	—	—
2014–15	HC Fribourg–Gottéron	NLA	30	5	8	13	10	—	—	—	—	—
2014–15	Växjö Lakers	SHL	20	6	3	9	2	18	5	8	13	2
2015–16	Syracuse Crunch	AHL	65	29	20	49	22	—	—	—	—	—
2016–17	Djurgårdens IF	SHL	41	4	5	9	18	—	—	—	—	—
2016–17	Växjö Lakers	SHL	10	0	0	0	2	6	0	3	3	0
AHL totals			241	130	120	250	134	7	1	2	3	2
NHL totals			242	27	36	63	88	6	0	0	0	2
SHL totals			116	23	15	38	54	24	5	11	16	2

=== International ===
Year	Team	Event	Result	GP	G	A	Pts	PIM
2001	Canada Pacific	U17	2nd place, silver medalist(s)	6	5	2	7	2
2004	Canada	WJC	2nd place, silver medalist(s)	6	2	3	5	0
Junior totals				12	7	5	12	2

== Awards ==
=== Junior ===
Award	Year
PIJHL First All-Star Team	1999–00
PIJHL Rookie of the Year	1999–00
Verne Dye Memorial Trophy (BCHL MVP; Coastal Conference)	2001–02
Brett Hull Trophy (BCHL Leading Scorer)	2001–02
Fred Page Cup (BCHL playoff champion; with Chilliwack Chiefs)	2002
Doyle Cup (Pacific regional champion; with Chilliwack Chiefs)	2002

=== College ===
Award	Year
Mason Cup (CCHA champion; with Michigan Wolverins)	2003, 2005
All-CCHA Rookie Team	2002-03
All-CCHA Second team	2002-03
CCHA Rookie of the Year	2002-03
All-CCHA First Team	2004-05
AHCA West Second-Team All-American	2004–05
CCHA All-Tournament Team	2005
CCHA Most Valuable Player in Tournament	2005

== Coaching career ==
Tambellini was hired for the 2017–18 season as an assistant coach for the University of Michigan.

From 2018 to 2020, he acted as the General Manager and Head coach of the BCHL Trail Smoke Eaters.

In August 2022, he was hired by the Seattle Kraken as the Director of Player Development.

Awards and achievements
Preceded by Pat Dwyer	CCHA Rookie of the Year; 2002–03	Succeeded by T. J. Hensick
Preceded by Paul Caponigri	CCHA Most Valuable Player in Tournament; 2005	Succeeded by Jeff Lerg
Sporting positions
Preceded by Brian Boyle	Los Angeles Kings first-round draft pick 2003	Succeeded by Lauri Tukonen
