= 2012–13 BCHL season =

2012-13 BCHL Season
- League: British Columbia Hockey League
- Sport: Hockey
- Duration: Regular season 2012-09-07 - 2013-03-10; Playoffs; 2013-03-15 - 2013-04-21
- Teams: 16
- Finals champions: Surrey Eagles

BCHL seasons
- 2011–12 BCHL 2013–14 BCHL

The 2012-13 BCHL season was the 51st season of the British Columbia Hockey League. (BCHL) The sixteen teams from the Coastal and Mainland Conferences will play 56 game schedules, starting with the 2012 BCHL Showcase in Chilliwack, BC.

Come March, the top teams from each division will play for the Fred Page Cup, the BCHL Championship. The winner of the Fred Page Cup will compete in the first-ever Western Canadian Junior A championship, the Western Canada Cup in Nanaimo, BC. If successful against the winners of the Alberta Junior Hockey League, Saskatchewan Junior Hockey League, Manitoba Junior Hockey League and the Western Canada Cup host, the champion and runner-up would then move on to play for the Canadian Junior Hockey League championship, the Royal Bank Cup, in Summerside, Prince Edward Island.

In their run to the RBC Cup, the Surrey Eagles would lose in the semifinals to the host Summerside Western Capitals

== Changes ==
Map of BCHL, 2012–13 to 2014–15
Island Division
Mainland Division
Interior Division
- The Chilliwack Chiefs and Prince George Spruce Kings have been moved to the Coastal Conference
  - The Interior Conference now consists of six teams: Merritt, Pentiction, West Kelowna, Vernon, Salmon Arm and Trail.
  - The ten team Coastal Conference has been divided into two divisions:
    - The Island Division contains Victoria, Cowichan Valley, Nanaimo, Alberni Valley and Powell River.
    - The Mainland Division contains Prince George, Chilliwack, Coquitlam, Langley and Surrey.
- For the playoffs, the Mainland Division side of the bracket will start with a best-of-5 division semifinal and a best-of-5 division final, while the Interior Conference side will start with a best-of-seven conference semifinal. The conference finals on both sides and the Fred Page Cup Final will both remain a best-of-seven series.
- The season has been reduced from 60 games to 56.
- The season will start with a three-day "BCHL Showcase," where all sixteen teams will play two games; One of which would be considered a home game.
- The Westside Warriors have been renamed to the West Kelowna Warriors.
- A team that ices the puck or shoots the puck over the glass in their defensive end will not be allowed to change during the ensuing stoppage. If said stoppage would allow for the period's one-minute "sponsor time out," it will still occur, but the offending team will still not be allowed to change.

== Final standings ==
Note: GP = Games Played, W = Wins, L = Losses, T = Ties, OTL = Overtime Losses, Pts = Points

Interior Conference
Team	Centre	W–L–T-OTL	Points
Penticton Vees	Penticton, BC	35-16-0-5	75
West Kelowna Warriors	West Kelowna, BC	30-13-4-9	73
Merritt Centennials	Merritt, BC	31-17-3-5	70
Salmon Arm Silverbacks	Salmon Arm, BC	26-24-2-4	58
Trail Smoke Eaters	Trail, BC	26-28-0-2	54
Vernon Vipers	Vernon, BC	21-25-1-9	52
Coastal Conference
Island Division
Team	Centre	W–L–T-OTL	Points
Victoria Grizzlies	Victoria, BC	33-13-0-10	76
Nanaimo Clippers	Nanaimo, BC	32-20-0-4	68
Alberni Valley Bulldogs	Port Alberni, BC	29-20-2-5	65
Powell River Kings	Powell River, BC	20-25-2-9	51
Cowichan Valley Capitals	Duncan, BC	13-35-1-7	54
Mainland Division
Team	Centre	W–L–T-OTL	Points
Surrey Eagles	White Rock, BC	35-13-3-5	78
Chilliwack Chiefs	Chilliwack, BC	33-21-1-1	68
Prince George Spruce Kings	Prince George, BC, BC	25-22-1-8	59
Langley Rivermen	Langley Township, BC	25-26-1-5	54
Coquitlam Express	Coquitlam, BC	24-31-1-0	49

- Teams are listed on the official league website.

== 2012-2013 BCHL Fred Page Cup Playoffs ==
Division Semifinals	Division Finals/ Conference Semifinals
1	Victoria	3
4	Powell River	2
1	Victoria	2
3	Alberni Valley	3
2	Nanaimo	2
3	Alberni Valley	3
Coastal Conference
1	Surrey	3
4	Langley	0
1	Surrey	3
2	Chilliwack	0
2	Chilliwack	3
3	Prince George	2
1	Penticton	4
4	Salmon Arm	0
Interior Conference
2	West Kelowna	4
3	Merritt	1

Conference Finals
1	Surrey	4
2	Alberni Valley	0
1	Penticton	4
2	West Kelowna	1

Fred Page Cup Final
1	Surrey	4
2	Penticton	2

== Scoring Leaders ==
GP = Games Played, G = Goals, A = Assists, P = Points, PIM = Penalties in minutes

Player	Team	GP	G	A	Pts	PIM
Mario Puskarich	Langley Rivermen	55	41	48	89	37
Austin Plevy	Chilliwack Chiefs	54	30	43	73	28
Myles Fitzgerald	Victoria Grizzlies	52	30	41	71	32
Luke Esposito	Chilliwack Chiefs	55	17	54	71	48
Brady Shaw	Surrey Eagles	54	38	32	70	53
Marcus Basara	West Kelowna Warriors	56	33	37	70	83
Wade Murphy	Penticton Vees	50	23	47	70	50
John Siemer	Penticton Vees	55	25	44	69	56
Seb Lloyd	West Kelowna Warriors	52	24	42	66	37
Evan Campbell	Langley Rivermen	51	20	46	66	46

== Leading Goaltenders ==
Note: GP = Games Played, Mins = Minutes Played, W = Wins, L = Losses, T = Ties, GA = Goals Against, SO = Shutouts, Sv% = Save Percentage, GAA = Goals against average. Regulation losses and overtime losses have been combined for total losses.

Player	Team	GP	Mins	W	L	T	GA	SO	Sv%	GAA
Michael Santaguida	Surrey Eagles	42	2582	29	10	3	98	3	0.933	2.28
Mitch Gillam	Chilliwack Chiefs	46	2750	27	18	1	116	4	0.929	2.53
Jarred Schamerhorn	Nanaimo Clippers	7	355	3	2	0	13	0	0.928	2.20
Tyler Briggs	West Kelowna Warriors	38	2323	22	13	3	95	2	0.925	2.45
Chad Katunar	Penticton Vees	43	2436	25	15	0	95	2	0.920	2.36

== Award winners ==
With the exception of the Brett Hull Trophy, each award is given to two players; One in each conference.

- Brett Hull Trophy (Top Scorer): Mario Puskarich (Langley)
- Best Defenceman: Devon Toews (Surrey) & Troy Stecher (Penticton)
- Bruce Allison Memorial Trophy (Rookie of the Year): Luke Esposito (Surrey) & Ryan Gropp (Penticton)
- Bob Fenton Trophy (Most Sportsmanlike): Ryan Lough (Alberni Valley) & Brandon Mistal (Salmon Arm)
- Top Goaltender: Michael Santaguida (Surrey)
- Wally Forslund Memorial Trophy: Chad Katunar & Nic Reynard (Penticton)
- Vern Dye Memorial Trophy (regular-season MVP): Mitch Gillam (Chilliwack) & Brent Baltus (Trail)
- Joe Tennant Memorial Trophy (Coach of the Year): Bill Bestwick (Victoria) & Luke Pierce (Merritt)
- Ron Boileau Memorial Trophy (Best Regular Season Record): Surrey Eagles
- Cliff McNabb Trophy (Coastal Conference Champions): Surrey Eagles
- Ryan Hatfield Trophy (Interior Conference Champions): Penticton Vees
- Fred Page Cup (League Champions): Surrey Eagles

== Players Selected in 2013 NHL entry draft ==
- Rd3 65: Adam Tambellini - New York Rangers (Surrey Eagles)
- Rd4 89: David Pope - Detroit Red Wings (West Kelowna Warriors)
- Rd5 129: Evan Campbell - Edmonton Oilers (Langley Rivermen)
- Rd6 164: Dane Birks - Pittsburgh Penguins (Merritt Centennials))
- Rd7 185: Wade Murphy - Nashville Predators (Penticton Vees)
- Rd7 193: Jedd Soleway - Phoenix Coyotes (Penticton Vees)
- Rd7 197: Nolan De Jong - Minnesota Wild (Victoria Grizzlies)

== See also ==
- 2013 Royal Bank Cup
- Western Canada Cup
- List of BCHL seasons
- British Columbia Hockey League
- Canadian Junior Hockey League
- 2012 in ice hockey
- 2013 in ice hockey
