= 2010–11 BCHL season =

2010–11 BCHL Season
- League: British Columbia Hockey League
- Sport: Ice hockey
- Duration: Regular season September – February; Playoffs; February – April
- Teams: 16

Fred Page Cup
- League champions: Vernon Vipers
- Runners-up: Powell River Kings

Doyle Cup
- Western Canada champions: Vernon Vipers
- Western Canada runners-up: Spruce Grove Saints

Royal Bank Cup
- Champions: Pembroke Lumber Kings
- Runners-up: Vernon Vipers

BCHL seasons
- 2009–10 2011–12

The 2010–11 BCHL season is the 49th season of the British Columbia Hockey League (BCHL). The regular season began on September 10, 2010 and ended on February 20, 2011. At the end of the playoff season, the Vernon Vipers defeated the Powell River Kings in a 4–0 sweep to win the Fred Page Cup. The Vernon Vipers then continued on to win the Doyle Cup by defeating the Spruce Grove Saints in a 4–3 series. During the 2011 Royal Bank Cup run, the Vernon Vipers lost to the Pembroke Lumber Kings in the final round.

== Changes ==
- The Williams Lake Timberwolves were declared in "bad standing" by the league and was indefinitely suspended.
- The Burnaby Express move to Coquitlam, become the Coquitlam Express

== Standings ==
Interior Conference
Team	Centre	W-L-T-OTL	Points
Vernon Vipers	Vernon	36–11–4–9	85
Penticton Vees	Penticton	38–17–3–2	81
Salmon Arm Silverbacks	Salmon Arm	38–19–2–1	79
Westside Warriors	West Kelowna	33–20–2–5	73
Trail Smoke Eaters	Trail	31–23–2–4	68
Merritt Centennials	Merritt	22–31–1–6	51
Quesnel Millionaires	Quesnel	13–38–3–6	35
Prince George Spruce Kings	Prince George	13–40–1–6	33
Coastal Conference
Team	Centre	W-L-T-OTL	Points
Powell River Kings	Powell River	46–9–3–2	97
Surrey Eagles	White Rock	35–22–1–2	73
Langley Chiefs	Langley	31–21–1–7	70
Victoria Grizzlies	Victoria	33–24–0–3	69
Nanaimo Clippers	Nanaimo	29–23–1–7	66
Alberni Valley Bulldogs	Port Alberni	24–29–4–3	55
Coquitlam Express	Coquitlam	22–28–1–9	54
Cowichan Valley Capitals	Duncan	21–30–1–8	51

At end of regular season

Map of BCHL, 2010–11
Coastal Division
Interior Division

First round
Westside	4
Trail	3
Penticton	4
Quesnel	0
Salmon Arm	4
Merritt	0
Surrey	4
Coquitlam	0
Langley	4
Alberni Valley	0
Victoria	4
Nanaimo	1

Quarter-finals
Westside	2
Vernon	4
Penticton	1
Salmon Arm	4
Surrey	4
Langley	2
Powell River	4
Victoria	3

Semi-finals
Vernon	4
Salmon Arm	2
Surrey	2
Powell River	4

Fred Page Cup Final
Vernon	4
Powell River	0

== 2011 Doyle Cup ==
The defending Vernon Vipers defeated the AJHL championship Spruce Grove Saints in 7 games. Vernon went on to the 2011 Royal Bank Cup, where they finished in second place after losing to the Central Junior Hockey League's Pembroke Lumber Kings in the final.

=== Game Results ===
- Game 1: Spruce Grove 1 – 3 Vernon
- Game 2: Spruce Grove 3 – 2 Vernon
- Game 3: Spruce Grove 5 – 2 Vernon
- Game 4: Vernon 3 – 1 Spruce Grove
- Game 5: Vernon 3 – 2 Spruce Grove (OT)
- Game 6: Vernon 0 – 2 Spruce Grove
- Game 7: Vernon 4 – 2 Spruce Grove

== Scoring leaders ==
The following players led the league in points at the conclusion of the regular season.

GP = Games played; G = Goals; A = Assists; P = Points

Player	Team	GP	G	A	P
Mike Hammond	Salmon Arm Silverbacks	57	39	54	93
Jordan Grant	Cowichan Valley Capitals	60	38	51	89
Bradley McGowan	Surrey Eagles	59	36	53	89
Chad Niddery	Powell River Kings	56	28	58	86
Joey LaLeggia	Penticton Vees	58	20	62	82
Matt Garbowsky	Powell River Kings	56	44	36	80
Josh Myers	Langley Chiefs	59	40	40	80
Alex Grieve	Westside Warriors	60	31	47	78
David Morley	Victoria Grizzlies	52	25	51	76
Massimo Lamacchia	Coquitlam Express	60	35	39	74

=== Leading goaltenders ===
Note: GP = Games Played, Mins = Minutes Played, W = Wins, L = Losses, T = Ties, Mins = Minutes Played, GA = Goals Against, SO = Shutouts, GAA = Goals Against Average, SV% = Save Percentage

Player	Team	GP	W	L	T	Mins	GA	SO	GAA	SV%
Michael Garteig	Powell River Kings	48	36	8	3	2,805	79	7	.934	1.69
Blake Voth	Vernon Vipers	40	25	11	3	2,408	85	4	.905	2.12
Joel Rumpel	Penticton Vees	45	27	12	3	2,586	108	1	.912	2.51
Karel St-Laurent	Surrey Eagles	32	19	12	1	1,905	87	1	.916	2.74
Matt Ginn	Victoria Grizzlies	51	29	21	0	2,998	141	2	.916	2.82
Kiefer Smiley	Trail Smoke Eaters	47	23	22	2	2,816	133	2	.915	2.83

== Award winners ==
With the exception of the Brett Hull Trophy and goaltender awards, each award is given to two players; One in each conference.

- Brett Hull Trophy (Top Scorer):
  - Mike Hammond (Salmon Arm Silverbacks)
- Best Defenceman:
  - Coastal division: Justin Dasilva (Powell River Kings)
  - Interior division: Joey Laleggia (Penticton Vees)
- Bruce Allison Memorial Trophy:
  - Coastal division: Destry Straight (Coquitlam Express)
  - Interior division: Bryce Gervais (Salmon Arm Silverbacks)
- Bob Fenton Trophy (Most Sportsmanlike):
  - Coastal division: Brad McGowan (Surrey Eagles)
  - Interior division: Grayson Downing (Westside Warriors)
- Top Goaltender (Lowest GAA with >1000 minutes played):
  - Michael Garteig (Penticton Vees)
- Wally Forslund Memorial Trophy (Best Goaltending Duo):
  - Michael Garteig & Sean Maguire (Penticton Vees)
- Vern Dye Memorial Trophy (regular-season MVP):
  - Coastal division: Matt Garbowsky (Powell River Kings)
  - Interior division: Joey Laleggia (Penticton Vees)
- Joe Tennant Memorial Trophy (Coach of the Year):
  - Coastal division: Kent Lewis (Powell River Kings)
  - Interior division: Tim Kehler (Salmon Arm Silverbacks)
- Ron Boileau Memorial Trophy (Best Regular Season Record):
  - Powell River Kings
- Cliff McNabb Trophy (Coastal Conference Champions):
  - Powell River Kings
- Ryan Hatfield Trophy (Interior Conference Champions):
  - Vernon Vipers
- Fred Page Cup (League Champions):
  - Vernon Vipers

== Players Selected in 2011 NHL entry draft ==
- Rd5 #140: Joel Lowry – Los Angeles Kings (Victoria Grizzlies)
- Rd6 #160: Josh Manson – Anaheim Ducks (Salmon Arm Silverbacks)

== See also ==
- Doyle Cup
- 2011 Royal Bank Cup
- 2010 in ice hockey
- 2011 in ice hockey
- 2011 NHL entry draft
- British Columbia Hockey League
- British Columbia Amateur Hockey Association
- Canadian Junior Hockey League
