= BC Elite Hockey League =

Youth hockey league based in British Columbia, Canada

- Sport: Ice hockey
- Founded: 2004
- No. of teams: 14
- Country: Canada
- Most recent champion: Okanagan Rockets
- Related competitions: Telus Cup
- Website: www.bcehl.net

The British Columbia Elite Hockey League (BCEHL) is the highest level of provincial youth ice hockey league in British Columbia, Canada. The league is governed by BC Hockey and was inaugurated in 2004 as the British Columbia Hockey Major Midget League (BCMML).

The league currently consists of 9 integrated teams (U15, U17, U18) and 5 U18 women's teams. Players range from 14 to 17 years old. BCEHL is part of BC Hockeys' "High Performance" program to develop the best U18 players around the province. The U18 league champion goes on to compete with the top Alberta Elite Hockey League (AEHL) U18 team to represent the Pacific region at the annual Telus Cup, Canada's national U18 championship. The Okanagan Rockets are the current 2023 champions, and the 2022 Vancouver North East Chiefs were the last team to represent the BCEHL at the Telus Cup.

== History ==
Originally established in 2004–05 as the British Columbia Major Midget League for players under 18 years of age, a female division was initialized in 2007–08 and played under the umbrella of the Female Midget AAA League. In 2018, a U16 AAA league was created (now the U17 AAA league), followed by a U15 AAA league in 2019. These four divisions (Female U18 AAA, U18 AAA, U17 AAA and U15 AAA) now comprise the BCEHL.

On September 16, 2021, the league was announced as being renamed the British Columbia Elite Hockey League.

== Current teams ==
=== Integrated ===
- Cariboo Cougars
- Fraser Valley Thunderbirds
- Greater Vancouver Canadians
- Okanagan Rockets
- Thompson Blazers
- Vancouver Island Royals
- Valley West Giants
- Vancouver North East Chiefs
- Vancouver North West Hawks

=== Female ===
- Fraser Valley Rush
- Greater Vancouver Comets
- Northern Capitals
- Thompson Okanagan Lakers
- Vancouver Island Seals

== Former teams ==
- North Island Silvertips (merged in 2023 with South Island Royals to form Vancouver Island Royals)
- Kootenay Ice
- Kootenay Wild (female)

== U18 League champions ==
Year	Champion	Pacific Championship	Result in Telus Cup
2026	Okanagan Rockets	Defeated Edmonton Jr. Oilers Blue	Third
2025	Okanagan Rockets	Defeated Calgary Flames	Fifth
2024	Vancouver North East Chiefs	Lost to Calgary Buffaloes	–
2023	Okanagan Rockets	Lost to Calgary Flames	–
2022	Vancouver North East Chiefs	Defeated Calgary Buffaloes	Sixth
2021	Was not played	Was not played	Cancelled due to COVID-19 pandemic
2020	Okanagan Rockets	Was not played	Cancelled due to COVID-19 pandemic
2019	Cariboo Cougars	Lost to Calgary Buffaloes	–
2018	Fraser Valley Thunderbirds	Lost to Lethbridge Hurricanes	–
2017	Cariboo Cougars	Lost to Leduc Oil Kings	Sixth
2016	Valley West Hawks	Lost to Lloydminister Bobcats	–
2015	Vancouver North East Chiefs	Lost to UFA Bisons	–
2014	Okanagan Rockets	Defeated Red Deer Chiefs	Bronze
2013	Vancouver North West Giants	Lost to Red Deer Chiefs	–
2012	Vancouver North West Giants	Lost to Red Deer Optimist Rebels	–
2011	Vancouver North West Giants	Defeated Red Deer Optimist Rebels	Fourth
2010	Vancouver North West Giants	Lost to Red Deer Optimist Rebels	–
2009	Vancouver North West Giants	Lost to Calgary Buffaloes	–
2008	Cariboo Cougars	Lost to Calgary Buffaloes	–
2007	Vancouver North West Giants	N/A (Note: The Giants earned an automatic bye into the Telus Cup because the Red Deer Optimist Rebels were hosting the tournament)	Fourth
2006	Okanagan Rockets	Lost to Calgary Buffaloes	–
2005	Thompson Blazers	Lost to SSAC Boston Pizza Athletics	–

== Telus Cup ==
The Vancouver North West Giants (2007, 2011), Okanagan Rockets (2014) and the Vancouver North East Chiefs (2022) are the only teams to have represented the league at the Telus Cup. Upon the Giants' winning the BC MML championship in 2007, a regional final with the AMHL was not necessary as Red Deer was hosting the Telus Cup that year. The Giants finished fourth in the Telus Cup tournament in 2007 before returning four years later; they again finished fourth in 2011. The 2014 Rockets, meanwhile, won the bronze medal.

Prior to the inauguration of the BC MML, the national midget championship was held in British Columbia twice – hosted by Kelowna in 1996 and Prince George in 2001. The Burnaby Winter Club Travellers represent the only B.C. team to win the national championship, defeating the Gouverneurs de Ste-Foy from Quebec in 1982, as well as winning bronze in 1980.

== Timeline of franchises (since 2004) ==
Former member Current member

== See also ==
- BC Hockey
- Telus Cup
- Alberta Elite Hockey League
