= 2011–12 BCHL season =

2011–12 BCHL Season
- League: British Columbia Hockey League
- Sport: Hockey
- Duration: Regular season 2011-09-23 – 2012-03-11; Playoffs; 2012-03-16 – 2013-04-11
- Teams: 16
- Finals champions: Penticton Vees

BCHL seasons
- 2010–11 BCHL 2012–13 BCHL

The 2011–12 BCHL season marked the 50th anniversary of the British Columbia Hockey League (BCHL). The sixteen teams from the Coastal and Interior Conferences played 60 game schedules.

Come March, the top teams from each division will play for the Fred Page Cup, the BCHL Championship. The winner of the Fred Page Cup plays the AJHL champion in a best-of-seven series for the right to represent the Pacific region in the Royal Bank Cup

== Changes ==
Map of BCHL, 2011–12
Interior Division
Coastal Division
- The Fred Page Cup Playoffs have been reduced by one round. The top four teams from each conference will advance instead of the top six.
- The Quesnel Millionaires moved to Chilliwack, becoming the Chilliwack Chiefs
- In response to Chilliwack having a team again, the Langley Chiefs renamed themselves to the Langley Rivermen

== Final standings ==
Note: GP = Games Played, W = Wins, L = Losses, T = Ties, OTL = Overtime Losses, Pts = Points

Interior Conference
Team	Centre	W–L–T-OTL	Points
Penticton Vees	Penticton, BC	54–4–0–2	110
Merritt Centennials	Merritt, BC	34–18–2–6	76
Prince George Spruce Kings	Prince George, BC, BC	33–21–2–4	72
Chilliwack Chiefs	Chilliwack, BC	33–22–2–3	71
Vernon Vipers	Vernon, BC	30–27–1–2	63'
Westside Warriors	West Kelowna, BC	22–29–2–7	53
Salmon Arm Silverbacks	Salmon Arm, BC	16–35–0–9	41
Trail Smoke Eaters	Trail, BC	11–42–1–6	29
Coastal Conference
Team	Centre	W–L–T-OTL	Points
Powell River Kings	Powell River, BC	40–16–2–2	84
Surrey Eagles	White Rock, BC	36–15–2–7	81
Cowichan Valley Capitals	Duncan, BC	36–16–1–7	80
Coquitlam Express	Coquitlam, BC	33–22–2–3	71
Nanaimo Clippers	Nanaimo, BC	26–25–0–9	61
Alberni Valley Bulldogs	Port Alberni, BC	22–34–2–2	48
Langley Rivermen	Langley Township, BC	19–35–1–5	44
Victoria Grizzlies	Victoria, BC	21–38–1–6	43

- Teams are listed on the official league website.

== 2011–2012 BCHL Fred Page Cup Playoffs ==
Conference Semifinals
1	Penticton	4
4	Chilliwack	2
Interior Conference
2	Merritt	4
3	Prince George	0
1	Powell River	4
4	Coquitlam	2
Coastal Conference
2	Surrey	4
3	Cowichan Valley	3

Conference Finals
1	Penticton	4
2	Merritt	1
1	Powell River	4
2	Surrey	1

Fred Page Cup Final
1	Penticton	4
2	Powell River	0

== 2012 Doyle Cup ==
The 2012 Doyle Cup was played between the BCHL Champion Penticton Vees, and the AJHL Champion Brooks Bandits

Doyle Cup
AB	Brooks	1
BC	Penticton	4

=== Game Results ===
- Game 1: Penticton 7 – 2 Brooks
- Game 2: Penticton 1 – 0 Brooks
- Game 3: Brooks 4 – Penticton 3
- Game 4: Brooks 1 – 6 Penticton
- Game 5: Brooks 2 – 6 Penticton

Penticton would then move on to the 2012 Royal Bank Cup. They would win the national championship with a 4–3 win over the MHL champion Woodstock Slammers in the final.

== Scoring leaders ==
GP = Games Played, G = Goals, A = Assists, P = Points, PIM = Penalties in minutes

Player	Team	GP	G	A	Pts	PIM
Paul De Jersey	Prince George Spruce Kings	59	41	57	98	58
Joey Bonik	Penticton Vees	60	30	66	96	29
Mario Lucia	Penticton Vees	56	42	52	94	42
Wade Murphy	Penticton Vees	60	36	55	91	66
Travis St. Denis	Penticton Vees	54	37	52	89	83
Alex Petan	Coquitlam Express	55	38	50	88	70
Connor Reilly	Penticton Vees	54	35	31	86	29
Mike Reilly	Penticton Vees	51	24	59	86	42
Steven Fogarty	Penticton Vees	60	33	49	82	32
Jujhar Khaira	Prince George Spruce Kings	54	29	50	79	69

== Leading goaltenders ==
Note: GP = Games Played, Mins = Minutes Played, W = Wins, L = Losses, T = Ties, GA = Goals Against, SO = Shutouts, Sv% = Save Percentage, GAA = Goals against average.
Regulation losses and overtime losses have been combined for total losses.

Player	Team	GP	Mins	W	L	T	GA	SO	Sv%	GAA
Michael Garteig	Penticton Vees	45	2578	41	5	0	83	5	0.927	1.93
Cole Huggins	Coquitlam Express	34	1726	21	6	2	86	2	0.918	2.99
Tyler Steel	Merritt Centennials	29	1640	15	11	1	71	3	0.916	2.60
Andrew Hunt	Surrey Eagles	52	3079	30	19	1	150	1	0.913	2.92
Sean Maguire	Powell River Kings	31	1774	17	12	1	69	3	0.913	2.33

Based on goaltenders with a minimum of 20 games.

== Award winners ==
With the exception of the Brett Hull Trophy and goaltender awards, each award is given to two players; One in each conference.

- Brett Hull Trophy (Top Scorer): Paul De Jersey (Prince George)
- Best Defenceman: Craig Dalrymple (Powell River) & Mike Reilly (Penticton)
- Bruce Allison Memorial Trophy (Rookie of the Year): Alexander Kerfoot (Coquitlam) & Mario Lucia (Penticton)
- Bob Fenton Trophy (Most Sportsmanlike): Alexander Kerfoot (Coquitlam) & Regan Soquila (Merritt)
- Top Goaltender: Michael Garteig (Penticton)
- Wally Forslund Memorial Trophy (Best Goaltending Duo): Sean Maguire & Jonah Inoo (Powell River)
- Vern Dye Memorial Trophy (regular-season MVP): Alex Petan (Coquitlam) & Paul De Jersey (Prince George)
- Joe Tennant Memorial Trophy (Coach of the Year): Matt Erhart (Surrey) & Fred Harbinson (Penticton)
- Ron Boileau Memorial Trophy (Best Regular Season Record): Penticton Vees
- Cliff McNabb Trophy (Coastal Conference Champions): Powell River Kings
- Ryan Hatfield Trophy (Interior Conference Champions): Penticton Vees
- Fred Page Cup (League Champions): Penticton Vees

== Records broken ==
The Penticton Vees, with three NHL draftees on their squad, went on an unprecedented streak throughout the course of the season that saw multiple BCHL records fall:

- Winning streak: 42 (New BCHL record)
- Points: 110 (New BCHL record for a 60-game season)
- Wins: 54 (New BCHL record for a 60-game season)

== Players selected in 2012 NHL entry draft ==
- Rd3 #63 Jujhar Khaira – Edmonton Oilers (Prince George)
- Rd4 #113 Sean Maguire – Pittsburgh Penguins (Powell River)
- Rd5 #141 Reace Willcox – Philadelphia Flyers (Merritt)
- Rd5 #150 Alexander Kerfoot – New Jersey Devils (Coquiltlam)
- Rd6 #177 Wesley Myron – Vancouver Canucks (Victoria)

== See also ==
- 2012 Royal Bank Cup
- Doyle Cup
- List of BCHL seasons
- British Columbia Hockey League
- Canadian Junior Hockey League
- 2011 in ice hockey
- 2012 in ice hockey
