= NHL All-Star Skills Competition =

Professional ice hockey skills competition

The National Hockey League All-Star Skills Competition, officially the NHL All-Star Game SuperSkills Competition during certain past years, is an event on the night preceding the National Hockey League All-Star Game. Started at the 41st National Hockey League All-Star Game in Pittsburgh in 1990, the NHL uses the event to showcase the talents of its all-star participants. The All-Star teams select representatives for each event, with points awarded to the winning team.

== Current events ==
(Through 2024)

=== Accuracy shooting ===
The purpose of the event is to hit the four targets attached to the four corners of a goal in the fastest time. Before 2011, the object of the event was to hit all four targets in as few attempts as possible. Under this format, seven players have gone four-for-four: Ray Bourque in 1992 and 1993, Mark Messier in 1996, Jeremy Roenick in 2004, Tomas Kaberle in 2008, Evgeni Malkin in 2009, Daniel Sedin in 2011, plus Nazem Kadri, Brock Nelson and twice with Connor McDavid in 2023. Sedin is the current record holder, hitting 4/4 targets in 7.3 seconds. For the 2018 competition, the traditional foam targets were replaced with LED targets that light up to show the player where to shoot the puck next. During the 2019 Skills Competition, the LED light-up targets featured face emojis of four all-star NHL players. The 2020 competition introduced a fifth target in the center of the net, with the targets showing each player's name, team logo, All-Star Game logo, number of All-Star appearances by that player, and uniform number. The 2023 edition reverted to the four foam targets but also introduced a knock-out style to the competition. As a result, while having the best time of the night, McDavid would ultimately be third in the competition, being beaten by Kadri in the semi-finals.

==== Winners ====
Season	Team	Player	Hits/Shots^{^{#}}
1990	Wales Conference	Ray Bourque	4/7
1991	Campbell Conference	Mark Messier	4/5
1992	Wales Conference	Ray Bourque	4/4
1993	Wales Conference	Ray Bourque	4/4
1994	Western Conference	Brendan Shanahan	4/5
1996	Eastern Conference	Mark Messier	4/4
1997	Eastern Conference	Ray Bourque	4/7
1998	North America	Ray Bourque; Peter Forsberg; Brendan Shanahan	4/6
1999	North America	Ray Bourque; Keith Tkachuk; Jeremy Roenick	4/6
2000	World	Ray Bourque; Viktor Kozlov	4/5
2001	North America	Ray Bourque	4/6
2002	North America	Jarome Iginla; Markus Naslund	4/6
2003	Eastern Conference	Jeremy Roenick	4/6
2004	Eastern Conference	Jeremy Roenick	4/4
2007	Eastern Conference	Eric Staal; Marian Hossa	4/5
2008	Eastern Conference	Tomas Kaberle	4/4
2009	Eastern Conference	Evgeni Malkin	3/4
2011	Team Staal	Daniel Sedin	4/4 in 7.3 seconds
2012	Team Chara	Jamie Benn	10.204
2015	Team Foligno	Patrick Kane	13.529
2016	Eastern Conference	John Tavares	12.294 (4/5)
2017	Metropolitan Division	Sidney Crosby	10.73 (4/5)
2018	Pacific Division	Brock Boeser	11.136
2019	Atlantic Division	David Pastrnak	11.309
2020	Metropolitan Division	Jaccob Slavin	9.505 (5/8)
2022	Metropolitan Division	Sebastian Aho	10.937 (4/4)
2023	Metropolitan Division	Brock Nelson	12.419 (4/5)
2024	Team McDavid/Arnett	Connor McDavid	9.158 (4/4)

#:Score in final round is listed

=== Breakaway challenge ===
From the 2007–08 season onwards, the Breakaway Challenge format was changed to a "slam dunk" style challenge, where individual shooters showcase creative and skillful breakaways, with the winner being determined by fan voting via text messaging.

==== Winners ====
Season	Player
2008	Alexander Ovechkin
2009	Alexander Ovechkin
2011	Alexander Ovechkin
2012	Patrick Kane
2015	Ryan Johansen
2016	P. K. Subban
2022	Alex Pietrangelo
2023	Alexander Ovechkin and Sidney Crosby

=== Fastest skater ===
The purpose of the event is to be fastest skater around a designated course within the rink. The final race each year was originally one full lap around the rink until 2008, when the event was revised to a course, only to be changed back to one full lap after 2015. In 2017, Canadian-born Connor McDavid finished with a time of 13.020, setting the record.

==== Winners ====
Season	Player	Time (seconds)^{^{†}}
1990	Mike Gartner	28.1 mph
1991	Paul Coffey	n/a
1992	Sergei Fedorov	14.363
1993	Mike Gartner	13.510
1994	Sergei Fedorov	13.525
1996	Mike Gartner	13.386
1997	Peter Bondra	13.610
1998	Scott Niedermayer	13.560
1999	Peter Bondra	14.640
2000	Sami Kapanen	13.649
2001	Bill Guerin	13.690
2002	Sami Kapanen	14.039
2003	Marian Gaborik	13.713
2004	Scott Niedermayer	13.783
2007	Andy McDonald	14.03
2008	Shawn Horcoff	14.395
2009	Andrew Cogliano	14.31
2011	Michael Grabner	14.060
2012	Carl Hagelin*	13.218
2015	Jonathan Drouin*	13.103
2016	Dylan Larkin	13.172
2017	Connor McDavid	13.020
2018	Connor McDavid	13.454
2019	Connor McDavid	13.378
2020	Mathew Barzal	13.175
2022	Jordan Kyrou	13.550
2023	Andrei Svechnikov	13.699
2024	Connor McDavid	13.408

=== Hardest shot ===
The purpose of the event is to have the hardest shot. Martin Frk owns the record for the hardest shot in hockey with 109.2 mph during the 2020 AHL all-star competition. Zdeno Chara owns the NHL record for the hardest shot with 108.8 mph (175.1 km/h) in 2012, besting his previous record of 105.9 in 2011. Before Chara the record was held by Al Iafrate at 105.2 mph. After Chara, Shea Weber holds the 3 hardest shots in 2015 and 2016, with 108.5 mph (174.6 km/h) in 2015, 108.1 (174 km/h) and 107.8 (173.5 km/h) on his post-match gala shot. (The world record is 110.3 mph (177.5 km/h) held by Denis Kulyash)

Al MacInnis holds the record for the most number of hardest shot wins at seven total (with an * on his speeds, as Al MacInnis always used a wooden stick, rather than the reinforced composite/foam that modern sticks are made out of, because he said he got more accuracy with a wooden stick. He likely would have had a faster shot using the more modern sticks).

==== Winners ====
Season	Player	Speed (mph)
1990	Al Iafrate	96.0
1991	Al MacInnis	94.0
1992	Al MacInnis	93.0
1993	Al Iafrate	105.2
1994	Al Iafrate	102.7
1996	Dave Manson	96.0
1997	Al MacInnis	98.9
1998	Al MacInnis	100.4
1999	Al MacInnis	98.5
2000	Al MacInnis	100.1
2001	Fredrik Modin	102.1
2002	Sergei Fedorov	101.5
2003	Al MacInnis	98.9
2004	Sheldon Souray; Adrian Aucoin	102.2
2007	Zdeno Chara	100.4
2008	Zdeno Chara	103.1
2009	Zdeno Chara	105.4
2011	Zdeno Chara	105.9
2012	Zdeno Chara	108.8
2015	Shea Weber	108.5
2016	Shea Weber	108.1 107.8 (gala shot)
2017	Shea Weber	102.8
2018	Alexander Ovechkin	101.3
2019	John Carlson	102.8
2020	Shea Weber	106.5
2022	Victor Hedman	103.2
2023	Elias Pettersson	103.2
2024	Cale Makar	102.5

=== Passing challenge ===
The challenge made its debut in 2018, was named Premier Passer in 2019, and renamed to Passing Challenge in 2024 after a 4-year absence. The purpose of this event is for skaters to earn points for their division by passing the puck to various targets, courses, and nets in the fastest time possible. Note: Each skill must be completed before moving on to the next station.

- Target passing: each player must complete four successful passes to the targets that randomly light up.
- Give and go: each player must complete the four required passes through the course.
- Mini nets: each player must complete a pass into each of the four mini nets and the game net.

==== Winners ====
Year	Player	Time/Points
2018	Alex Pietrangelo	0:46.610
2019	Leon Draisaitl	1:09.088
2024	Elias Pettersson	25 points

=== One-timers ===
The purpose of this event, which debuted in 2024, is to score as many timed "one-timer" (passed puck shots) points in the net as possible. The player takes three one-timers from three different designated areas on the ice. Points are rewarded when the puck enters the net. (Scoring: top shelf/upstairs equals 4 points, on each side equals 3 points, down the middle equals 2 points, and ricochets off the pipe equals 1 point) If a puck hits the bottom barrier of the net or the crossbar or misses the net, then it's zero points. Each player gets one minute to fire all nine shots. If a pass is not to their liking, they can let them go, but can only get five total passes at each location. If a stick breaks, the clock stops. The player who earns the most points wins.

==== Winners ====
Season	Player	Points	Time
2024	Nathan MacKinnon	23 points	39 seconds

=== Stick handling ===
This event made its debut in 2024 and its purpose is for the players to showcase their smooth stick work. They must skate forward and backward through an obstacle course on the ice. They have to control the puck around objects in the way they approach the goal, firing the puck on the net to stop the clock. The player with the fastest time wins. Note: This portion was taken from the former Puck Control Relay event last held in 2019.

==== Winners ====
Season	Player	Time
2024	Connor McDavid	25.755 seconds

=== One-on-one ===
This event debuted in 2024 and showcases the goaltenders. The player in last place goes first and selects the goalie they want to face just as long they're not teammates. Players have 60 seconds to face the netminder as pucks are placed in designated areas on the ice. The first five pucks are worth 1 point (closest to the net) then the unlimited pucks (placed on the blue line) are worth 2 points. Players must carry the puck as they cross the hash marks before firing on the net. They cannot score off a rebound. If the player is carrying the puck when the clock hits zero, they have to take that final shot. The highest total of goals wins. Note: The goaltender who stops the most pucks will take home a $100,000 prize.

==== Winners ====
Season	Player/Goalie	Points	Goaltender	Saves
2024	William Nylander	12 points	Alexandar Georgiev	9 saves

=== Obstacle course ===
This was a special event that debuted in 2024 as a way to determine the player's point totals to find out the overall winner of the entire Skills Competition. Players will showcase all their skills on the ice with speed (while carrying the puck), stick handling (carrying the through a series of mini light-up bridges), passing precision (shooting the puck in three mini nets), then carrying the puck through a cone course, and shooting accuracy (score a goal through a small hole in the net). The fastest time wins this final event. Tally up the scores and the player with the highest total will win the $1 million prize.

==== Winners ====
Season	Player	Points	Time
2024	Connor McDavid	10 points	40.606 seconds

==== Final standings ====
Season	Player	Team	Points
2024	Connor McDavid	Edmonton Oilers	25 points
2024	Cale Makar	Colorado Avalanche	20 points
2024	Auston Matthews	Toronto Maple Leafs	18 points
2024	William Nylander	Toronto Maple Leafs	16 points
2024	Matt Barzal	New York Islanders	13.5 points
2024	J.T. Miller	Vancouver Canucks	12 points

== Past events ==
The following is a partial list of past events:

=== Breakaway relay ===
The Breakaway Relay was held from 1991 to 2007. The purpose of the event is to use teamwork to score on a breakaway against an opposing goalie. Points are awarded to the team with the most goals and the individual goalie who lets in the fewest goals.

==== Winners ====
Season	Team	Player
1991	Campbell Conference	Mike Vernon
1992	Wales Conference	Mike Richter; Don Beaupre
1993	Campbell Conference	Jon Casey; Mike Vernon; Ed Belfour
1994	Western Conference	Curtis Joseph
1996	Eastern Conference	Dominik Hasek
1997	World	Dominik Hasek; Guy Hebert
1998	World; North America	Dominik Hasek
1999	World	Dominik Hasek; Arturs Irbe
2000	World	Tommy Salo
2001	World	Sean Burke; Evgeni Nabokov
2002	North America	Dominik Hasek; Patrick Roy
2003	Western Conference	Patrick Roy
2004	Eastern Conference	Roberto Luongo
2007	Western Conference	Roberto Luongo

=== Elimination shootout ===
The Elimination Shootout was held from 2008 to 2012. The purpose of the event is for individual scorers to try to score on a breakaway against an opposing goalie. Shooters who score stay alive in the contest while those failing to score are eliminated. The contest goes until all shooters are eliminated but one, with that shooter being the winner.

==== Winners ====
Season	Player
2008	Dion Phaneuf
2009	Shane Doan
2011	Corey Perry
2012	Steven Stamkos

=== Elite women's 3-on-3 hockey ===
The Elite Women's 3-on-3 Hockey was held in 2020. Twenty of the best women's players in the world competed in a 20-minute, 3-on-3 game, with ten American All-Stars facing off against ten Canadian All-Stars.

There were two 10-minute periods with a running clock (except last minute of regulation and penalty shots). Teams switch ends after one period of play. Penalties will be "served" with a penalty shot being awarded to the player fouled. In the event of a tie, there will be a 3-minute sudden death overtime with a running clock to determine the winner. If tied after overtime, a sudden death shootout will occur.

Rosters

Team Canada

Forwards: Meghan Agosta, Melodie Daoust, Rebecca Johnston, Sarah Nurse, Marie-Philip Poulin, Natalie Spooner and Blayre Turnbull.

Defensemen: Renata Fast and Laura Fortino.

Goaltender: Ann-Renee Desbiens.

Coach: Jayna Hefford

Team USA

Forwards: Anne Pankowski, Alex Carpenter, Kendall Coyne Schofield, Brianna Decker, Amanda Kessel, Hilary Knight, Jocelyne Lamoureux-Davidson.

Defensemen: Kacey Bellamy and Lee Stecklein

Goaltender: Alex Rigsby Cavallini.

Coach: Cammi Granato

==== Winners ====
Season	Team	Score
2020	Team Canada	2–1

=== Four-line challenge ===
The Four-line challenge was held in 2017. The purpose of this event is for four skaters from each team to earn points by scoring goals from each line on the ice.

- 1st skater – two shots from near the blue line. The goal in the upper corners of the net = 1 point.
- 2nd skater – two shots from center ice. The goal in lower corners = 1 point. The goal in the upper corners = 3 points.
- 3rd skater – two shots from the far blue line. The goal in the lower center corner ("five hole") = 1 point. The goal in the upper corners = 5 points.
- 4th skater – two shots from the far goal line. The goal in "five hole" = 10 points. If the goalie scores = 20 points.

==== Winners ====
Season	Team	Score
2017	Pacific Division	23 points

=== Goaltenders competition ===
The Goaltenders competition was held from 1990 to 2007. Points are awarded to the goalie allowing the fewest goals against in the Zone and Shootout/Breakaway Relay Events.

==== Winners ====
Season	Player	Goals Against, Shots
1990	Kirk McLean	4, 27
1991	Patrick Roy	2, 25
1992	Mike Richter	2, 25
1993	Jon Casey	5, 40
1994	John Vanbiesbrouck; Patrick Roy	4, 16
1996	Dominik Hasek	4, 16
1997	John Vanbiesbrouck	2, 16
1998	Dominik Hasek	3, 16
1999	Arturs Irbe	2, 16
2000	Mike Richter	2, 16
2001	Sean Burke	5, 15
2002	Dominik Hasek; Patrick Roy	1, 9
2003	Patrick Roy	1, 9
2004	Roberto Luongo	1, 12
2007	Roberto Luongo	0, 12

=== NHL shooting stars ===
The NHL shooting stars was held in 2020. It had players shooting from an elevated platform approximately 30 feet above the ice surface of the rink located in the seating bowl. Each Player shoots 7 pucks, scoring points for each target hit. (The arch target in center ice is 145 feet from the shooting platform). Players may hit the same target multiple times. In the event of a tie, a sudden death "score-off" will occur.

==== Winners ====
Season	Player	Points
2020	Patrick Kane	22 (tied), won in OT

=== NHL shootout ===
The NHL Shootout was held from 2015 to 2017. The purpose of this event is for individual shooters to try to score on a breakaway against an opposing goalie. It is similar to the past event, Elimination Shootout; however, the shooter is not eliminated. The contest continues for three 2-minute rounds as six skaters from each team per round get a chance to score on the opposing team's goalie, gathering enough points until time runs out. Goals scored with game pucks equal 1 point, while Discover shootout pucks equal 2 points.

==== Winners ====
Season	Team	Score
2015	Team Foligno	6–5
2016	Eastern Conference	17–4
2017	Atlantic Division	4–1

=== Puck control relay ===
The puck control relay was held from 1990 to 2019. The purpose of the event is to be the fastest skater over the course while also maintaining control of the puck through a series of pylons. There are two races; the first where each team has three skaters in a race against each other and the second for the best individuals of each conference. One goal was awarded to the winning team of each competition.

This event returned in 2018. Skaters from each division earn points for their skills with puck handling in the fastest time possible. Note: each skill must be completed before moving on to the next station.

- Stick-handling: each skater must control the puck through a series of eight pucks.
- Cone Control: each skater with a puck must skate through a series of eight cones.
- Gates: as a skater approaches each gate, he must shoot the puck through the lit rung.

==== Winners ====
Season	Team	Player	Time
1990	Campbell Conference	none	
1991	Campbell Conference	none	
1992	Campbell Conference	none	
1993	Wales Conference	none	
1994	Eastern Conference	Russ Courtnall	
1996	Western Conference	Pierre Turgeon	
1997	Western Conference	Geoff Sanderson	
1998	World	Teemu Selanne	
1999	North America	Paul Kariya	
2000	North America	Paul Kariya	
2001	North America	Paul Kariya	
2002	North America	Paul Kariya	
2003	Western Conference	Martin St. Louis	
2004	Western Conference	Rick Nash	
2007	Western Conference	Rick Nash	
2008	Eastern Conference	none	
2018	Pacific Division	Johnny Gaudreau	24.650 seconds
2019	Pacific Division	Johnny Gaudreau	27.045 seconds

=== Save streak ===
The save streak was held from 2018 to 2022. The purpose of this event is for goaltenders to earn points for their division by saving as many pucks as possible against an opposing division's shooter in NHL shootout fashion. The goaltender with the longest "save streak" and most saves wins the competition. Note: the winning goaltender receives $25,000.

- Each scoring attempt is officiated under NHL shootout rules and begins on the referee's whistle.
- Each goalie will face all players from an opposing division.
- Players from each division will shoot numerically with the division captain shooting last.
- If a goalie saves the divisional captain's shot, he will continue to face shooters until a goal is scored.
- If there is a tie for the longest "save streak", the winner will be determined by the total number of saves made in their round.

==== Winners ====
Season	Player	Team	Saves
2018	Marc-Andre Fleury	Vegas Golden Knights	14
2019	Henrik Lundqvist	New York Rangers	12
2020	Jordan Binnington	St Louis Blues	10
2022	Jack Campbell & Andrei Vasilevskiy	Toronto Maple Leafs & Tampa Bay Lightning	9

=== Skills challenge relay ===
The skills challenge relay was held from 2011 to 2017. This event had the following relays:

- One timers – three shooters must each score 2 goals from various locations in the offensive zone
- Passing – one passer must complete a pass into six small nets
- Puck Control Relay – one skater with the puck skates through a series of cones
- Stick Handling – one skater controls the puck through a series of pucks
- Accuracy Shooting – one shooter must hit four targets
- Goalie Goals - one goalie must score 2 goals

Two groups of each team participate: one-timers having left-hand shooters in one group and right-hand shooters in another.

==== Winners ====
Season	Team	Time
2011	Team Lidstrom	2:18.000
2012	Team Alfredsson	2:08.776
2015	Team Foligno	1:37.979
2016	Western Conference	1:27.687
2017	Metropolitan Division	1:29.700

== Skills Conference winner ==
In 2009, there was no score kept.

In 2016, the winning conference was given the choice of whether to play the first or second mini-game in the All-Star Game the next day. In 2017, the winning division was given the choice of which opponent to play first in the All-Star Game.

In 2018, even though there were four divisions, the competition focused on individual players, and no score was kept.

Season	Team
1990	Campbell Conference
1991	Wales Conference
1992	Wales Conference
1993	Campbell Conference
1994	Western Conference
1996	Western Conference
1997	Eastern Conference
1998	World
1999	World
2000	World
2001	North America
2002	World
2003	Western Conference
2004	Eastern Conference
2007	Eastern Conference
2008	Eastern Conference
2009	None
2011	Team Staal
2012	Team Alfredsson
2015	Team Foligno
2016	Eastern Conference
2017	Atlantic Division
2018	None
