= 2024 National Hockey League All-Star Game =

Professional ice hockey exhibition game

2024 NHL All-Star Game

Scotiabank Arena, Toronto
- February 3, 2024
- Game one: Team McDavid 4 – Team MacKinnon 3
- Game two: Team Matthews 6 – Team Hughes 5
- Game three: Team Matthews 7 – Team McDavid 4
- MVP: Auston Matthews

The 2024 National Hockey League All-Star Game was held on February 3, 2024 at Scotiabank Arena in Toronto, the home of the Toronto Maple Leafs. It was the first time that the four-team, three-on-three format used since 2016 was combined with the "fantasy draft" format used from 2011 to 2015. The fantasy draft took place on February 1, and was followed by the NHL All-Star Skills Competition on February 2. This was the 68th edition of the game.

The team captains were chosen by the NHL: Auston Matthews of the All-Star Game-hosting Maple Leafs captained one team, Connor McDavid of the Edmonton Oilers captained the second team, Nathan MacKinnon of the Colorado Avalanche captained the third team, and brothers Jack Hughes of the New Jersey Devils and Quinn Hughes of the Vancouver Canucks co-captained the fourth team.

Following this All-Star game, the NHL instead held a new 4 Nations Face-Off tournament in 2025. No event was held in 2026 due to the 2026 Winter Olympics. The next All-Star Game will take place in 2027.

== History ==
The NHL awarded Toronto as the host city of the game on February 4, 2023. This was the first time since 2012 in Ottawa that a Canadian city was selected to host the game. This was Toronto's ninth time hosting the NHL All-Star Game, including the first game in 1947. This was the second time that Scotiabank Arena (then known as Air Canada Centre) hosted the game, the first time being in 2000.

== Rosters ==
On November 27, 2023, the NHL announced that the fantasy player draft, used from 2011 to 2015, would make its return to the All-Star Game, while keeping the three-on-three format used since 2016. Like in the 2023 All-Star Game, the player selection process was performed in two stages, with the league's initially selecting 32 players, one for each team, and then the remaining 12 players were decided by fan vote. The league then selected four players to be captains for each of the four teams, and the draft of the players took place on February 1, 2024.

On January 14, the head coaches were announced, chosen from the team in each division with the highest points percentage through January 13: Jim Montgomery of the Boston Bruins (Atlantic), Peter Laviolette of the New York Rangers (Metropolitan), Rick Bowness of the Winnipeg Jets (Central), and Rick Tocchet of the Vancouver Canucks (Pacific).

On January 22, Kyle Connor and Vincent Trocheck were added as replacements for Connor Bedard and Jack Eichel who were unable to play due to injury. On January 30, Jesper Bratt was added to replace the injured Jack Hughes.

=== NHL's selections ===
The league announced its 32 selections on January 4:

Player	Team	Pos.
Frank Vatrano	Anaheim Ducks	F
Clayton Keller	Arizona Coyotes	F
David Pastrnak	Boston Bruins	F
Rasmus Dahlin	Buffalo Sabres	D
Elias Lindholm	Vancouver Canucks (Note: Lindholm was originally selected as a member of the Calgary Flames, before being traded to the Vancouver Canucks on January 31, 2024.)	F
Sebastian Aho	Carolina Hurricanes	F
Connor Bedard	Chicago Blackhawks	F
Nathan MacKinnon	Colorado Avalanche	F
Boone Jenner	Columbus Blue Jackets	F
Jake Oettinger	Dallas Stars	G
Alex DeBrincat	Detroit Red Wings	F
Connor McDavid	Edmonton Oilers	F
Sam Reinhart	Florida Panthers	F
Cam Talbot	Los Angeles Kings	G
Kirill Kaprizov	Minnesota Wild	F
Nick Suzuki	Montreal Canadiens	F
Filip Forsberg	Nashville Predators	F
Jack Hughes	New Jersey Devils	F
Mathew Barzal	New York Islanders	F
Igor Shesterkin	New York Rangers	G
Brady Tkachuk	Ottawa Senators	F
Travis Konecny	Philadelphia Flyers	F
Sidney Crosby	Pittsburgh Penguins	F
Tomas Hertl	San Jose Sharks	F
Oliver Bjorkstrand	Seattle Kraken	F
Robert Thomas	St. Louis Blues	F
Nikita Kucherov	Tampa Bay Lightning	F
Auston Matthews	Toronto Maple Leafs	F
Quinn Hughes	Vancouver Canucks	D
Jack Eichel	Vegas Golden Knights	F
Tom Wilson	Washington Capitals	F
Connor Hellebuyck	Winnipeg Jets	G
Vincent Trocheck^{†}	New York Rangers	F
Kyle Connor^{†}	Winnipeg Jets	F
Jesper Bratt^{†}	New Jersey Devils	F

- Injured; did not play.
- ^{†} Added as injury replacement.

=== Fan vote ===
The fan vote ran from January 4 to January 11 to determine the final 12 players (8 skaters and 4 goalies). The results were announced on January 13.

Player	Team	Pos.
Jeremy Swayman	Boston Bruins	G
Alexandar Georgiev	Colorado Avalanche	G
Cale Makar	Colorado Avalanche	D
Leon Draisaitl	Edmonton Oilers	F
Sergei Bobrovsky	Florida Panthers	G
Mitch Marner	Toronto Maple Leafs	F
William Nylander	Toronto Maple Leafs	F
Morgan Rielly	Toronto Maple Leafs	D
Brock Boeser	Vancouver Canucks	F
Thatcher Demko	Vancouver Canucks	G
J. T. Miller	Vancouver Canucks	F
Elias Pettersson	Vancouver Canucks	F

=== Draft ===
External videos
- 2024 All-Star Player Draft
- Replay (ESPN2's feed) on the NHL's official YouTube channel
- Replay (Sportsnet's feed) on Sportsnet's official YouTube channel

The draft of the NHL players took place on February 1, 2024. On January 4, the league announced that two of the captains would be Connor McDavid of the Edmonton Oilers and Auston Matthews of the Toronto Maple Leafs. The league then announced on January 20 that Nathan MacKinnon of the Colorado Avalanche would captain the third team, and brothers Jack Hughes of the New Jersey Devils and Quinn Hughes of the Vancouver Canucks would co-captain the fourth team. For alternate captains, Morgan Rielly joined Toronto teammate Matthews, Leon Draisaitl joined Edmonton teammate McDavid, and Cale Makar joined Colorado teammate MacKinnon. Although Jack Hughes was unable to play due to injury, he still participated in helping his brother Quinn in the players draft, and Elias Pettersson was named alternate captain of the fourth team in his place. Each team was also joined by a celebrity co-captain to help select their roster: singer Justin Bieber on Team Matthews, actor and comedian Will Arnett on Team McDavid, singer Tate McRae on Team MacKinnon, and singer Michael Buble on Team Hughes.

Hughes won the first pick in the draft, Matthews received the second pick, MacKinnon was awarded the third pick, and McDavid got the fourth pick. The teams selected in reverse order during even-numbered rounds. For the final round, Hockey Hall of Famer Dave Keon conducted a random draw of envelopes with the four remaining unselected players.

==== Team Matthews ====
Head coach: (Canada) Jim Montgomery, Boston Bruins / Celebrity captain: (Canada) Justin Bieber
Entry/Pick no.	Nat.	Player	Team	Pos.	#
C	(United States)	Auston Matthews	Toronto Maple Leafs	F	34
A	(Canada)	Morgan Rielly	Toronto Maple Leafs	D	44
2	(Sweden)	William Nylander	Toronto Maple Leafs	F	88
7	(Canada)	Mitch Marner	Toronto Maple Leafs	F	16
10	(United States)	Jake Oettinger	Dallas Stars	G	29
15	(United States)	Clayton Keller	Arizona Coyotes	F	9
18	(Canada)	Mathew Barzal	New York Islanders	F	13
23	(Russia)	Igor Shesterkin	New York Rangers	G	31
26	(Sweden)	Filip Forsberg	Nashville Predators	F	9
31	(United States)	Alex DeBrincat	Detroit Red Wings	F	93
—	(United States)	Vincent Trocheck	New York Rangers	F	16

==== Team McDavid ====
Head coach: (United States) Peter Laviolette, New York Rangers / Celebrity captain: (Canada) Will Arnett
Entry/Pick no.	Nat.	Player	Team	Pos.	#
C	(Canada)	Connor McDavid	Edmonton Oilers	F	97
A	(Germany)	Leon Draisaitl	Edmonton Oilers	F	29
4	(United States)	Connor Hellebuyck	Winnipeg Jets	G	37
5	(Czech Republic)	David Pastrnak	Boston Bruins	F	88
12	(Sweden)	Rasmus Dahlin	Buffalo Sabres	D	26
13	(Canada)	Robert Thomas	St. Louis Blues	F	18
20	(Canada)	Sam Reinhart	Florida Panthers	F	13
21	(Russia)	Sergei Bobrovsky	Florida Panthers	G	72
28	(Canada)	Boone Jenner	Columbus Blue Jackets	F	38
29	(Canada)	Nick Suzuki	Montreal Canadiens	F	14
—	(Czech Republic)	Tomas Hertl	San Jose Sharks	F	48

==== Team MacKinnon ====
Head coach: (Canada) Rick Bowness, Winnipeg Jets / Celebrity captain: (Canada) Tate McRae
Entry/Pick no.	Nat.	Player	Team	Pos.	#
C	(Canada)	Nathan MacKinnon	Colorado Avalanche	F	29
A	(Canada)	Cale Makar	Colorado Avalanche	D	8
3	(Canada)	Sidney Crosby	Pittsburgh Penguins	F	87
6	(Russia)	Alexandar Georgiev	Colorado Avalanche	G	40
11	(Russia)	Kirill Kaprizov	Minnesota Wild	F	97
14	(Finland)	Sebastian Aho	Carolina Hurricanes	F	20
19	(Canada)	Tom Wilson	Washington Capitals	F	43
22	(United States)	Jeremy Swayman	Boston Bruins	G	1
27	(Canada)	Travis Konecny	Philadelphia Flyers	F	11
30	(Sweden)	Elias Lindholm	Vancouver Canucks	F	23
—	(Denmark)	Oliver Bjorkstrand	Seattle Kraken	F	22

==== Team Hughes ====
Head coach: (Canada) Rick Tocchet, Vancouver Canucks / Celebrity captain: (Canada) Michael Buble / Co-captain: (United States) Jack Hughes (Note: Hughes was unable to play but still participated in selecting players in the draft.)
Entry/Pick no.	Nat.	Player	Team	Pos.	#
C	(United States)	Quinn Hughes	Vancouver Canucks	D	43
A	(Sweden)	Elias Pettersson	Vancouver Canucks	F	40
1	(Russia)	Nikita Kucherov	Tampa Bay Lightning	F	86
8	(United States)	Thatcher Demko	Vancouver Canucks	G	35
9	(United States)	Kyle Connor	Winnipeg Jets	F	81
16	(United States)	Brady Tkachuk	Ottawa Senators	F	7
17	(Sweden)	Jesper Bratt	New Jersey Devils	F	63
24	(Canada)	Cam Talbot	Los Angeles Kings	G	39
25	(United States)	Brock Boeser	Vancouver Canucks	F	6
32	(United States)	J. T. Miller	Vancouver Canucks	F	9
—	(United States)	Frank Vatrano	Anaheim Ducks	F	77

== Skills Competition ==
The NHL All-Star Skills Competition, was held on February 2, having been revamped. Instead of having individual winners for each skill event, twelve specific players competed in multiple events to determine an overall winner. Each player first competed in four of the following six events: Fastest Skater, Hardest Shot, Stick Handling, One Timers, Passing Challenge, and Accuracy Shooting, with points given out based on the players' results. The top eight advanced to the One-on-One shootout. From there, the top six advanced to the final event, the Obstacle Course, with the winner of the competition winning a trophy and $1 million. Different from a regular game scenario, the pucks used in the Skills Competition were not frozen.

The players who participated in the Skills Competition were determined by a fan vote held concurrently with the main All-Star fan vote that ran from January 4 to January 11. Due to Jack Hughes' injury, Mathew Barzal served as his replacement.

- David Pastrnak (Boston)
- Nathan MacKinnon (Colorado)
- Cale Makar (Colorado)
- Connor McDavid (Edmonton)
- Leon Draisaitl (Edmonton)
- Jack Hughes (New Jersey)
- Nikita Kucherov (Tampa Bay)
- Auston Matthews (Toronto)
- William Nylander (Toronto)
- Quinn Hughes (Vancouver)
- J.T. Miller (Vancouver)
- Elias Pettersson (Vancouver)
- Mathew Barzal (NY Islanders)^{†}
  Injured; did not play.
  ^{†} Added as injury replacement.

=== Fastest Skater ===
Players skated one lap around the ice to compete for the fastest time.

Player	Results	Points
Connor McDavid	13.408	5
Mathew Barzal	13.519	4
Quinn Hughes	14.008	3
Cale Makar	14.089	2
William Nylander	14.164	1

=== One Timers ===
Players received one timer passes and tried to accumulate the most points by scoring various points for hitting certain areas of the net. Passers for the event included Connor Bedard and Sidney Crosby.

Player	Results	Points
Nathan MacKinnon	23	5
Leon Draisaitl	22	3.5
David Pastrnak	22	3.5
Elias Pettersson	20	2
Nikita Kucherov	19	0.5
J.T. Miller	18	0.5
Mathew Barzal	17	0
Auston Matthews	15	0

=== Passing Challenge ===
Players skated up and down the ice trying to complete cross-ice passes to various sized targets to accumulate the most points.

Player	Results	Points
Elias Pettersson	25	5
Cale Makar	23	4
Mathew Barzal	21	3
Auston Matthews	19	2
William Nylander	16	1
Quinn Hughes	15	0
Nathan MacKinnon	13	0
Leon Draisaitl	12	0
Connor McDavid	12	0
J.T. Miller	7	0
Nikita Kucherov	5	0

=== Hardest Shot ===
Each player took two shots to achieve the hardest shot, with the best of their two shots counting to the event.

Player	Results	Points
Cale Makar	102.50 mph	5
J.T. Miller	102.30 mph	4
Elias Pettersson	98.40 mph	3
Auston Matthews	96.22 mph	2
David Pastrnak	95.27 mph	1

=== Stick Handling ===
Players raced to achieve the fastest time through a stick-handling obstacle course that include dribbling the puck, skating backwards around cones with the puck, and finishing the course with a toe drag goal.

Player	Results	Points
Connor McDavid	25.755	5
Mathew Barzal	26.929	4
William Nylander	27.272	3
Nathan MacKinnon	27.715	2
Leon Draisaitl	28.677	1
Quinn Hughes	29.038	0
Elias Pettersson	29.526	0
David Pastrnak	38.488	0
Nikita Kucherov	44.178	0

=== Accuracy Shooting ===
Players raced to achieve the fastest time to knockout a shooting target in each of the four corners of the net. Passers for the event included Blayre Turnbull, Doug Gilmour, Sarah Nurse, and Steve Thomas.

Player	Results	Points
Connor McDavid	9.158	5
Auston Matthews	9.341	4
J.T. Miller	13.587	3
William Nylander	14.099	2
Quinn Hughes	14.815	1
Nathan MacKinnon	15.958	0
Nikita Kucherov	16.460	0
Cale Makar	19.069	0
David Pastrnak	19.670	0
Leon Draisaitl	46.089	0

=== One-on-One ===
The top eight point-earners from the first six events participated. Each player got to choose which goaltender they were shooting against and had 1 minute to score as many points as possible. The goaltender with the most saves in the event won $100,000.

Player	Goaltender	Results	Points
William Nylander	Cam Talbot	9	5
Auston Matthews	Thatcher Demko	7	4
Mathew Barzal	Igor Shesterkin	6	2.5
J.T. Miller	Jeremy Swayman	6	2.5
Cale Makar	Connor Hellebuyck	4	1
Nathan MacKinnon	Sergei Bobrovsky	2	0
Elias Pettersson	Jake Oettinger	3	0
Connor McDavid	Alexandar Georgiev	3	0

=== Obstacle Course ===
The top six point-earners from the first seven events participated. Players raced from one end of the ice to the other, competing for the fastest time, while also having to complete a stick-handling challenge, a saucer pass challenge, and a slalom challenge, before having to score a goal. Points were doubled for this event.

Player	Results	Points
Connor McDavid	40.606	10
Cale Makar	43.435	8
Auston Matthews	47.271	6
William Nylander	49.065	4
J.T. Miller	49.351	2
Mathew Barzal	1:16.850	0

=== Final standings ===
Pos.	Player	Points
1	Connor McDavid	25.0
2	Cale Makar	20.0
3	Auston Matthews	18.0
4	William Nylander	16.0
5	Mathew Barzal	13.5
6	J.T. Miller	12.0
7	Elias Pettersson	10.0
8	Nathan MacKinnon	7.0
9	David Pastrnak	4.5
9	Leon Draisaitl	4.5
11	Quinn Hughes	4.0
12	Nikita Kucherov	0.5

== Bracket ==
Semifinals		Final
Team McDavid	4 (SO)
Team MacKinnon	3	Team McDavid	4
Team Hughes	5	Team Matthews	7
Team Matthews	6 (SO)

== Game summaries ==
Each game was played in abbreviated format, consisting of two 10-minute periods of 3-on-3 play.

=== First semifinal game ===
February 3, 2024	Team MacKinnon	3–4	SO	Team McDavid	Scotiabank Arena	Recap
Nathan MacKinnon (1) – 03:24		First period		07:58 – Boone Jenner (1)
Oliver Bjorkstrand (1) – 05:51; Nathan MacKinnon (2) – 06:45		Second period		09:28 – David Pastrnak (1); 09:54 – Connor McDavid (1)
No period		Third period		No period
Sidney Crosby; Nathan MacKinnon		Shootout		Connor McDavid; Leon Draisaitl; David Pastrnak
Jeremy Swayman 9 saves / 11 shots Alexandar Georgiev 9 saves / 10 shots		Goalie stats		Connor Hellebuyck 10 saves / 11 shots Sergei Bobrovsky 8 saves / 10 shots

=== Second semifinal game ===
February 3, 2024	Team Hughes	5–6	SO	Team Matthews	Scotiabank Arena	Recap
Nikita Kucherov (1) – 01:19; Frank Vatrano (1) – 03:32		First period		02:43 – Alex DeBrincat (1); 05:07 – Alex DeBrincat (2)
Elias Pettersson (1) – 04:18; Brady Tkachuk (1) – 07:02; Frank Vatrano (2) – 07:35		Second period		02:17 – Mitch Marner (1); 04:45 – Filip Forsberg (1); 08:08 – Filip Forsberg (2)
No period		Third period		No period
Kyle Connor; Nikita Kucherov; Elias Pettersson; J. T. Miller		Shootout		Filip Forsberg; Auston Matthews; William Nylander; Alex DeBrincat
Thatcher Demko 7 saves / 10 shots Cam Talbot 4 saves / 6 shots		Goalie stats		Jake Oettinger 8 saves / 10 shots Igor Shesterkin 7 saves / 10 shots

=== Final ===
February 3, 2024	Team McDavid	4–7	Team Matthews	Scotiabank Arena	Recap
Boone Jenner (2) – 05:08; David Pastrnak (2) – 08:08; Leon Draisaitl (1) – 08:26		First period	02:19 – Clayton Keller (1); 07:11 – Mitch Marner (2); 08:13 – Auston Matthews (1)
Tomas Hertl (1) – 08:34		Second period	01:06 – Filip Forsberg (3); 04:59 – Auston Matthews (2); 08:09 – en – Alex DeBrincat (3); 08:54 – Mathew Barzal (1)
No period		Third period	No period
Connor Hellebuyck 7 saves / 10 shots Sergei Bobrovsky 10 saves / 13 shots		Goalie stats	Jake Oettinger 8 saves / 9 shots Igor Shesterkin 7 saves / 10 shots

== Festivities and entertainment ==
=== Fan fair ===
The Fan Fair, held between February 1 and February 4 at the Metro Toronto Convention Centre, featured various fan activities during All-Star Weekend including games and appearances by NHL mascots and All-Star alumni. Various local businesses hosted themed events and activities throughout the weekend featuring current and former NHL players.

As part of the festivities, the NHL hosted their inaugural All-Star Pride Cup alongside the Toronto Gay Hockey Association and Pride Tape, on February 3. The teams were coached by former NHL player and current NHL Director of Social Impact, Growth and Fan Development Andrew Ference, and former NHL executive and current PWHL executive and advocate Brian Burke.

=== Professional Women's Hockey League Showcase ===
A Professional Women's Hockey League 3-on-3 Showcase game was played to conclude All-Star Thursday on February 1. Two teams of 12 players competed in one 20-minute game. The teams were named in honor of former tennis players and current PWHL advisory board members Billie Jean King and Ilana Kloss.

=== Mascot Showdown ===
Throughout the weekend, the thirty team mascots (the New York Rangers and Detroit did not have costumed mascots) competed in a series of events and competitions pitting the Eastern Conference against the Western Conference. Events included: Dodgeball, Skills Competition (Breakaway Challenge, Accuracy Shooting, Hardest Shot, Fastest Hoverboard, and T-Shirt Targets), Ice Hockey, Street Hockey, and Musical Chairs. Each competition was preceded by a mascot parade to the rink and concluded with a customary handshake line, demonstrating good sportsmanship. The Dodgeball game was won by the Western Conference, while the Eastern Conference won the Skills Competition, Ice Hockey game, and Street Hockey game.

=== Entertainment ===
Toronto Maple Leafs anthem singer and Canada's Got Talent season 4 finalist Natalie Morris performed the Canadian and American national anthems during NHL All-Star Thursday.

R&B singer Chxrry22 performed the Canadian national anthem and pop singer and Fifth Harmony member Dinah Jane performed the American national anthem to open the Skills Competition on February 2, 2024, while country singer Owen Riegling, rock band The Glorious Sons and singer-songwriter TALK headlined performances.

The All-Star Game on February 3 featured DJ duo Loud Luxury during the player introductions, country music duo and America's Got Talent season 19 contestant The Reklaws performing the Canadian national anthem, R&B singer Kiana Ledé performing the American national anthem, and pop singer and Team McKinnon celebrity co-captain Tate McRae performing during the second intermission.

American Sign Language interpretation was provided for all performances, by Lisa Dressler for All-Star Thursday and Lisa Faria for the Skills Competition and the All-Star Game.

== Media rights ==
In Canada, the players fantasy draft, the Skills Competition, and the All-Star Game were broadcast in English on Sportsnet. CBC also simulcast the Sportsnet coverage of the All-Star Game, while Citytv simulcast the ABC broadcast of that game for simultaneous substitution purposes. All three events were broadcast on TVA Sports in French, and streamed live in Canada on Sportsnet+.

In the U.S., ESPN2 covered the players fantasy draft, ESPN broadcast the Skills Competition, and ABC broadcast the All-Star Game. The players fantasy draft, Skills Competition, and the All-Star Game were streamed live in the U.S. on ESPN+.
