= Cale Makar =

Canadian ice hockey player (born 1998)

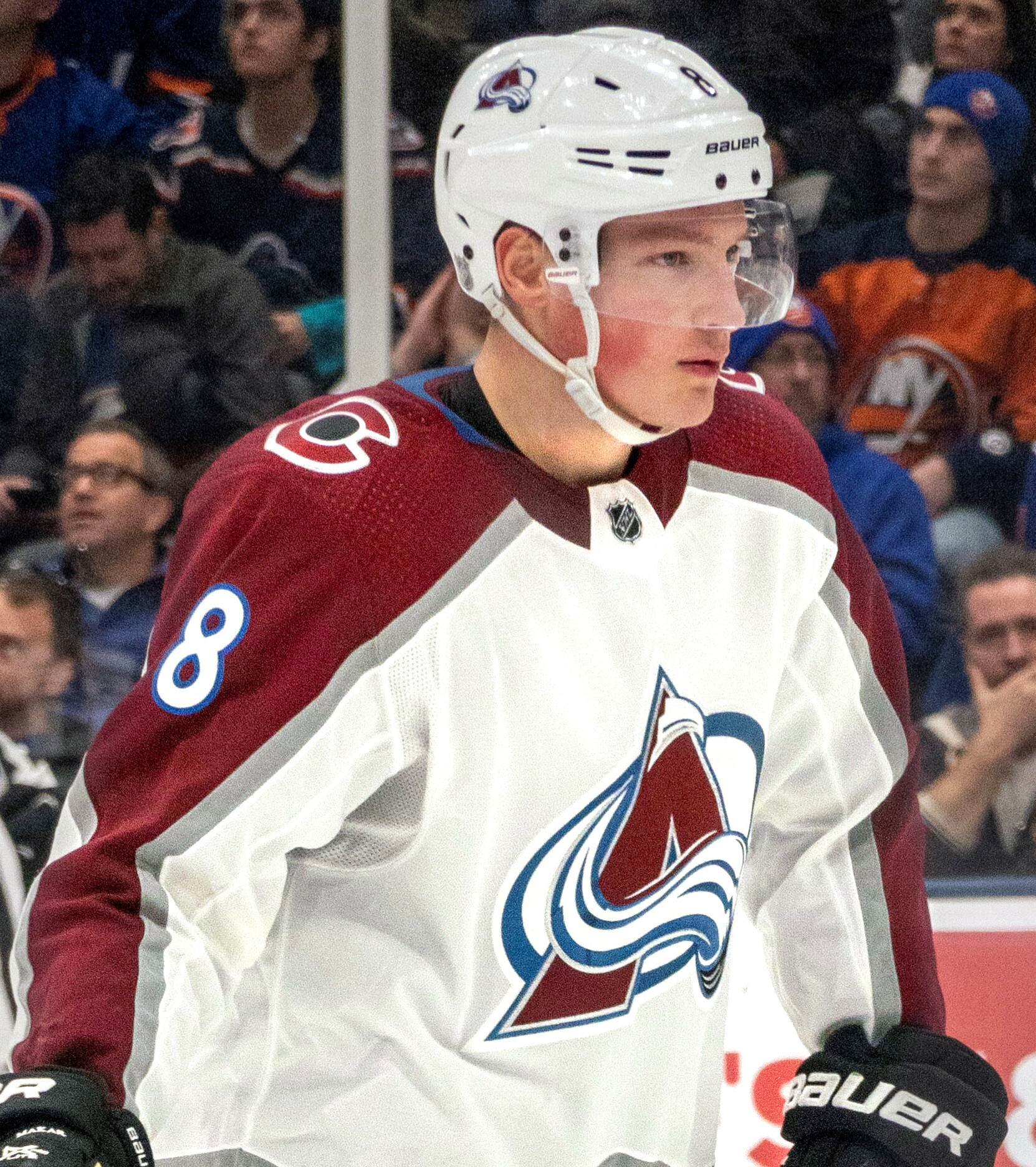
- Makar with the Colorado Avalanche in January 2020
- Born: October 30, 1998 (age 28) Calgary, Alberta, Canada
- Height: 6 ft 0 in (183 cm)
- Weight: 187 lb (85 kg; 13 st 5 lb)
- Position: Defence
- Shoots: Right
- NHL team: Colorado Avalanche
- National team: Canada
- NHL draft: 4th overall, 2017; Colorado Avalanche
- Playing career: 2019–present

Cale Douglas Makar (born October 30, 1998) is a Canadian professional ice hockey player who is a defenceman and alternate captain for the Colorado Avalanche of the National Hockey League (NHL). He was selected with the fourth overall pick by the Avalanche in the 2017 NHL entry draft.

After two seasons in the National Collegiate Athletic Association (NCAA) with the UMass Minutemen, Makar debuted in the NHL during the 2019 playoffs. Playing his first full season in 2019–20, he made an immediate impact and won the Calder Memorial Trophy as rookie of the year. In his second professional season he was nominated for the James Norris Memorial Trophy, awarded to the league's best defenceman, and won the Norris in the following 2022; he later won a second Norris in the 2025, in his fifth nomination. Makar won the Stanley Cup with the Avalanche in 2022, winning the Conn Smythe Trophy as the most valuable player in the 2022 playoffs. He has been widely cited as one of the best defencemen and best players in the modern NHL.

Internationally, Makar has played for the Canadian junior team, winning gold at the 2018 World Junior Championships. With the senior national team, he won gold at the 2025 4 Nations Face-Off and silver at the 2026 Winter Olympics.

== Playing career ==
=== Junior ===
Makar, a Calgary native, first played within the Crowchild Blackhawks minor-hockey program before moving to play with the Northwest Calgary Athletic Association (NWCAA) Bruins at the Bantam level in 2011. He also played bantam with the Calgary Flames before moving to minor midget with the NWCAA Stampeders. Makar was originally drafted at the major junior level by the Western Hockey League (WHL)'s Medicine Hat Tigers in the eighth round, 164th overall, of the 2013 WHL Bantam Draft.

Having returned to the Calgary Flames for the minor midget level, in his only full season with the club in 2014–15, Makar led the team in scoring with 23 points in 34 league games, being named the team's Most Valuable Player and selected to the Alberta Midget Hockey League First All-Star Team. To retain his NCAA eligibility, Makar joined as an affiliate player to the Brooks Bandits of the Alberta Junior Hockey League (AJHL) at the tail end of the season, recording five points in three regular season games. In helping the Bandits reach the finals, Makar was third among defenceman in scoring with 7 points in 20 games. Having agreed to return with the Bandits in the forthcoming seasons, Makar announced his commitment to play collegiate hockey with the University of Massachusetts Amherst of the Hockey East NCAA conference on August 29, 2015.

As a 17-year-old, Makar established himself as a standout defenceman with the Bandits in 2015–16, logging 55 points in 54 games, en route to earning AJHL All-League and All-Rookie recognition. He scored 14 points in 13 games to help the Bandits claim the AJHL championship. His productive season collected AJHL and CJHL Rookie of the Year Awards, the Western Canada Cup Top Defenceman Award, and the RBC Cup Top Defenceman, Top Scorer and Most Valuable Player awards.

Makar sustained and built upon his previous success in the 2016–17 season to lead all defencemen and finished sixth among all skaters in the AJHL with 75 points (24 goals and 51 assists) in 54 games, collecting the league's MVP and top defenceman accolades. He had 16 points in 13 playoff games to help Brooks to a second straight AJHL championship and six points in five games to help the Bandits to a second-place finish in the Royal Bank Cup. He was chosen as the RBC Cup Top Defenceman and Most Valuable Player, the first player to ever be named RBC Cup MVP in back-to-back seasons. He received the CJHL Most Valuable Player Award and won the prestigious RBC National Junior A Player of the Year Award.

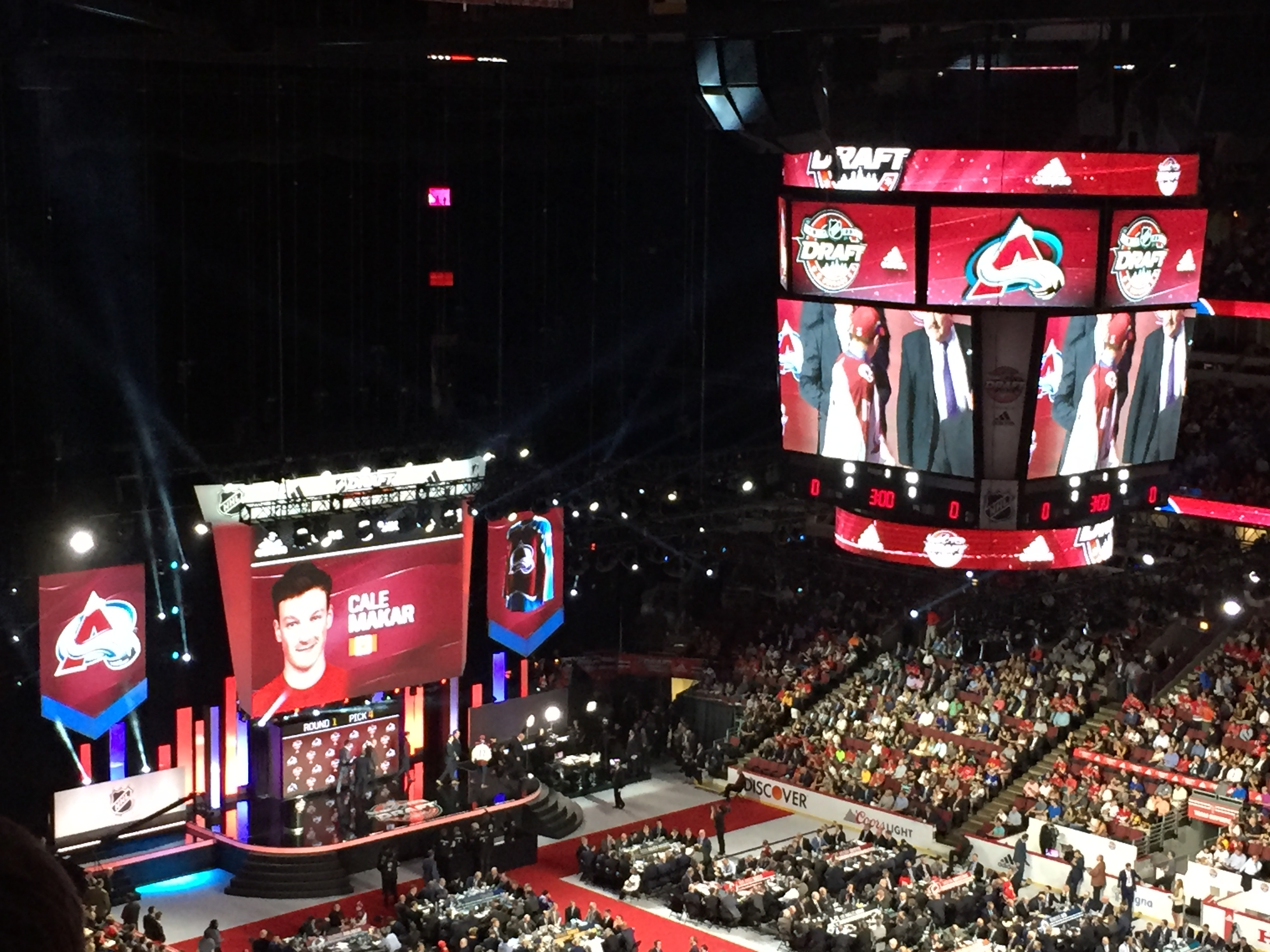
Makar selected by the Colorado Avalanche at the 2017 NHL entry draft.

Through Makar's rapid rise up the rankings before the 2017 NHL entry draft, he was considered a top prospect and one of the top defencemen available. He was described as a dynamic skater that creates offence whenever he is on the ice. Makar was ultimately selected fourth overall by the Colorado Avalanche, the second defenceman selected in the draft, after third overall selection Miro Heiskanen. Makar became the highest-drafted player to come straight from the AJHL, and just the second in the first round since Joe Colborne in 2008.

=== College ===
Despite his blue-chip prospect status, Makar opted to remain loyal to his commitment to joining the rebuilding UMass Minuteman program for the 2017–18 season. As a freshman, he immediately assumed a top-pairing role, alongside Jake McLaughlin, and recorded his first collegiate point in his debut against Arizona State University on October 6, 2017. He recorded his first goal in a 4–0 victory over Merrimack College on October 27, 2017.

While showing an adjustment period to the collegiate level, Makar raised his game through the new year to help the Minutemen to turnaround their program to make the postseason before suffering a 7–2 defeat to the hands of Northeastern University. He finished fifth on the team in scoring, second amongst defenceman, with 5 goals and 16 assists for 21 points in 34 games. He was selected with co-Rookie of the Year honors by the New England Hockey Writers Association and by finishing ninth in defenceman scoring in the Hockey East, he was selected to the conference's All-Rookie and Third All-Star Teams.

With the season concluded and despite interest from the Colorado Avalanche in turning pro, Makar opted to continue his development in returning for his sophomore season with UMass in 2018–19. That season, Makar became the first Minutemen honored as Hockey East Player of the Year after he led the league in scoring and finished second in the conference. Makar was also selected for the Hockey East First All-Star Team and named a Hobey Baker Award finalist. On April 12, Makar was announced the winner of the Hobey Baker. The following night, Makar and the Minutemen lost 3–0 to University of Minnesota Duluth in the Frozen Four final.

=== Professional ===
==== Debut and Calder Trophy (2019–2021) ====
On April 14, 2019, the Avalanche signed Makar to a three-year, entry-level contract. He scored his first career NHL goal with his first shot in the league in his debut a day later, during game 3 of the first round of the 2019 Stanley Cup playoffs against the Calgary Flames. In so doing, he became the first defenceman to score a playoff goal in his NHL debut.

Makar made the Avalanche opening lineup for the 2019–20 season and he scored his first career regular season goal in a 6–1 win over the Vegas Golden Knights. He was subsequently named a Third Star of the Week for the week of November 10, becoming the first Avalanche rookie to earn the honor. On November 12, 2019, in a 4–0 road win against the Winnipeg Jets, Makar became the second Avalanche defenceman to record 18 points in 18 games as a rookie. However, he suffered an upper-body injury in a game against the Boston Bruins on December 7 and was listed as day-to-day. At the time of his injury, he was leading rookies in scoring with 28 points in 29 games. Makar returned to the Avalanche's lineup on December 27, where he recorded an assist in the 6–4 loss to the Minnesota Wild. On January 18, 2020, Makar set a new Avalanche franchise record with his 11th goal of the season, besting John-Michael Liles record for most goals by a rookie defenceman. As a result of his play, he was named a Calder Memorial Trophy finalist alongside Quinn Hughes and Dominik Kubalík. During the second round of the NHL playoffs, Makar surpassed the record for most points in a postseason by a rookie defenceman, before it was beaten by Hughes the following night. Following the conclusion of the regular season, Makar was awarded the Calder Memorial Trophy as the rookie of the year.

After the pandemic-shortened 2020–21 season, which saw the Avalanche win the Presidents' Trophy, Makar was named a finalist for the James Norris Memorial Trophy and finished second in the voting for the trophy, behind Adam Fox of the New York Rangers.

==== Stanley Cup, Norris and Conn Smythe trophies (2021–present) ====
On July 24, 2021, Makar signed a six-year, $54 million extension with the Avalanche. On October 28, Makar scored two points (one goal and one assist) in a 4–3 win against the St. Louis Blues, in doing so, he scored his 100th point in just 108 games, which tied him with Sergei Zubov as the sixth-fastest defenceman to accomplish this feat. On March 25, 2022, Makar scored his 24th goal of the 2021–22 season in a 6–3 win against the Philadelphia Flyers, breaking the Avalanche's single-season record for goals scored by a defenceman. He finished the season with 28 goals, the most by a defenceman in the NHL since Brent Burns in the 2016–17 season, and 58 assists. 19 of his 28 goals were at even strength. Makar was named a James Norris Memorial Trophy finalist for the second consecutive season. He won the Norris Trophy, the first Avalanche defenceman to do so, and finished eighth in voting for the Hart Memorial Trophy, awarded by the Professional Hockey Writers' Association to the league's most valuable player. The Avalanche finished first in the Western Conference, and second in the league overall, advancing into the 2022 playoffs to meet the Nashville Predators in the first round. Makar scored 10 points in a four-game sweep of the Predators, setting a record for points by a defenceman in the first four games of a postseason. Teammate Nathan MacKinnon remarked, "he might be the best player in the league right now." He would amass a further 19 points in the next three rounds, as the Avalanche ousted the Blues and the Edmonton Oilers before defeating the two-time defending champion Tampa Bay Lightning in the 2022 Stanley Cup Final, winning his first Stanley Cup. Makar finished the playoffs with a team-leading 29 points (eight goals and 21 assists), the fourth-most for a defenceman in a single postseason in league history. He was awarded the Conn Smythe Trophy as the most valuable player in the postseason, and became only the third defenceman to win the Norris and Conn Smythe Trophies in the same season, after Bobby Orr (1970 and 1972) and Nicklas Lidström (2002).

Makar recorded 20 points in the first 17 games of the 2022–23 season, his 20th being a power play goal scored in a November 21, 2022, game against the Dallas Stars. This was his 200th career point in 195 games, the fastest pace of any NHL defenceman to that milestone. Previous record holder Sergei Zubov reached the mark in 207 games. He attracted notice when, during a December 19 game against the New York Islanders, he convinced the referee to rescind a tripping penalty that had been incorrectly assessed against Islanders forward Mathew Barzal, with Makar clarifying that he had fallen on his own rather than being tripped. Barzal remarked that it was "obviously, good sportsmanship on his part. I don't know if I would have done the same, to be honest with you." Injuries caused Makar to miss 22 games in the regular season, but he finished with 17 goals and 49 assists in 60 games, and was named a Norris Trophy finalist for the third consecutive year.

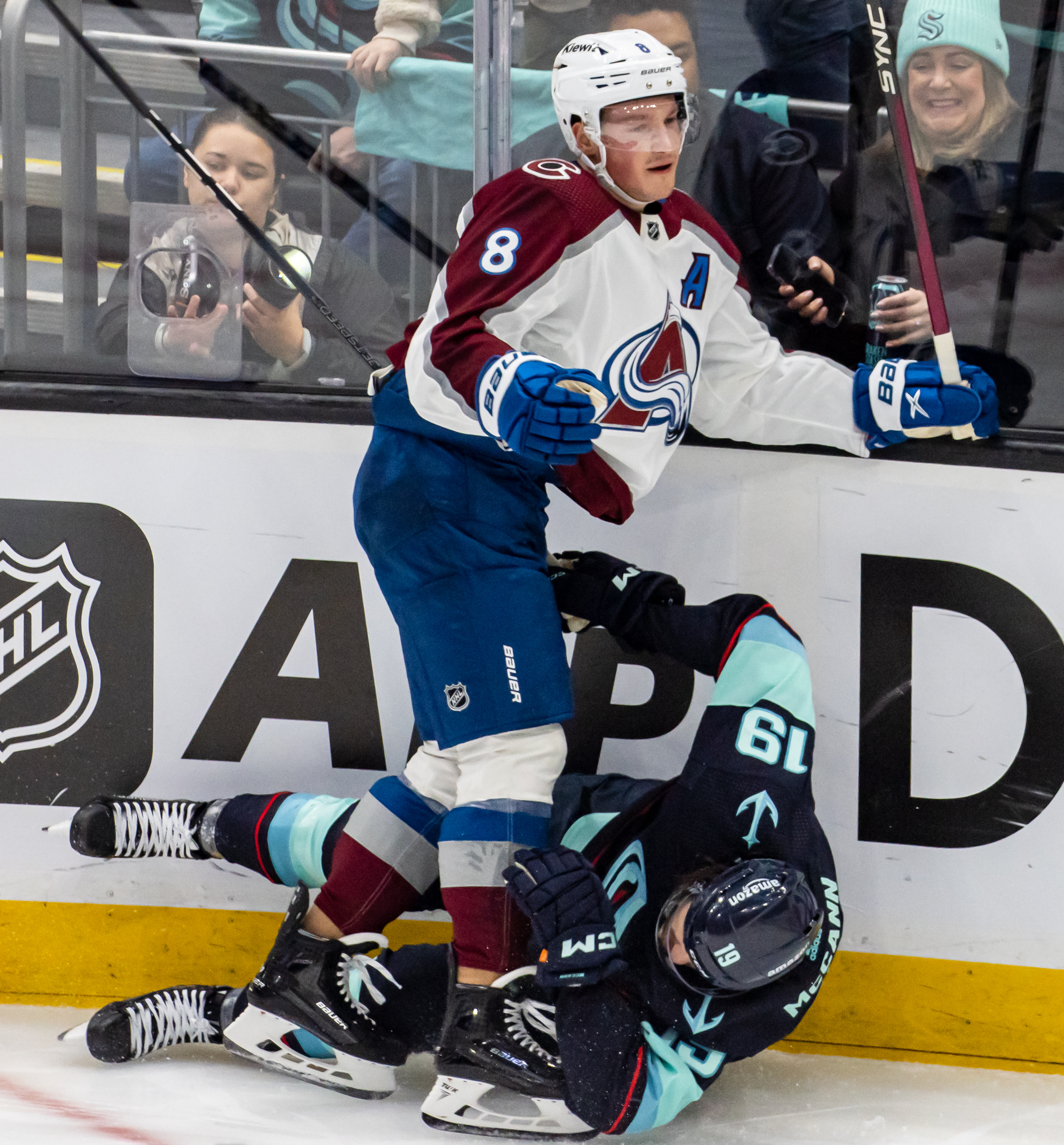
Makar after hitting Jared McCann during game four of the 2023 Stanley Cup playoffs.

During game four of the first round of the 2023 Stanley Cup playoffs, Makar was involved in a controversial on-ice incident after delivering what many deemed to be a hard, late hit into the boards on Seattle Kraken forward Jared McCann. Although the play had not officially been whistled dead, the puck had been deflected into the upper safety netting and McCann had slowed his pace in anticipation of a whistle when Makar delivered the hit. The officials initially appeared to assess Makar for a five-minute major penalty; he ultimately received a two-minute interference call. McCann, who was ruled out for game five, was injured as a result of the hit and did not return for the rest of the game, which was ultimately a 3–2 overtime victory for the Kraken. After the game, Makar stated that he had not intended to injure McCann and that he was unsure if the puck was still in play at the time. The next day, Makar received a one-game suspension for the hit on McCann; this was the first suspension (and first disciplinary offense) of Makar's NHL career. Makar returned for the remainder of the series, which saw the Avalanche upset by the Kraken in seven games.

On March 6, 2024, Makar recorded his first career NHL hat trick in a 7–2 victory over the Detroit Red Wings; becoming the first Avalanche defenceman to do so since Sandis Ozoliņš back on December 6, 1999. He was voted a Norris Trophy finalist for the fourth consecutive season, having finished second in points and first in points-per-game among defencemen.

The following 2024–25 season would see Makar reach new offensive achievements. On April 3, 2025, he recorded his 30th goal of the season, becoming the ninth defenceman in NHL history to reach that mark, and only second in the post-lockout era. In 80 games, he finished the season with 92 points (30 goals, 62 assists), ninth in league scoring overall. In addition to being a Norris Trophy finalist for the fifth time, he was for the first time a finalist for the Ted Lindsay Award, awarded by the National Hockey League Players' Association to the "most outstanding" player in the NHL, ultimately going to Tampa Bay Lightning's forward Nikita Kucherov. Makar was subsequently awarded his second career Norris Trophy on June 11, 2025, receiving 176 of 191 first-place votes.

During a March 18, 2026, game against the Dallas Stars, Makar scored his 20th goal of the 2025–26 NHL season, becoming the first defenceman since Phil Housley to score 20 goals in three straight seasons. He scored the 500th point of his career when he assisted on a Brock Nelson goal in a 4–2 loss to the Winnipeg Jets on March 28. Makar finished the regular season with 20 goals and 59 assists in 75 games, helping the Avalanche to win the Presidents' Trophy for the second time in his tenure. He was a Norris Trophy finalist for the sixth year in a row.

Entering the 2026–27 season, the final year of his contract, Makar signed an eight-year extension on August 28, 2026. With a total value of $163.2 million and an average annual value of $20.4 million, it was the most expensive contract in NHL history, and the first with an average annual value in excess of $20 million. This milestone came at a time of explosive projected growth in the league's salary cap as a result of revenue increases.

== International play ==
Medal record

Men's ice hockey

Representing Canada

Winter Olympics
Silver medal – second place	2026 Milano Cortina	

4 Nations Face-Off
Winner	2025 Canada/United States	

World Junior Championships
Gold medal – first place	2018 United States	

Makar was first selected by Hockey Canada to compete for Canada West at the World Junior A Challenge in 2015 and 2016. He was selected to the Tournament All-Star Team in both years and helped Canada West to a gold medal in 2015. Unable to defend the gold medal, Makar followed up by setting a tournament single-game record for points by a defenceman in 2016. Makar appeared for Canada at the World Junior Summer Showcase. He had one goal and one assist during the exhibition. His single goal came at a pivotal time on August 4, 2017, against Sweden, tying the game 4–4 in the third period. The marker re-energized the Canadians as they registered three more goals to pull off a 7–4 win.

Makar was selected to the Canada national junior team for the 2018 World Junior Championships, winning gold. Makar finished the tournament leading all defenceman with three goals and eight points in seven games, and was the only Canadian named to the All-Tournament Team.

Following the World Juniors, Makar reportedly turned down an invite to join the Canada senior team for the 2018 Winter Olympics to focus on his season at UMass, as he would have had to miss three weeks for the tournament.

With NHL players not being permitted to play in the 2022 Winter Olympics, and Colorado seeing extensive postseason success after Makar's NHL breakthrough, he did not play for Canada's national team until the 4 Nations Face-Off in 2025. After missing Canada's group stage game against the United States due to illness, he was able to return in time for the subsequent game against Finland. In the event final, a rematch against the United States, Makar had an assist on Connor McDavid's winning goal in overtime, earning his first senior international title.

Makar was one of the first six players named to Canada's team for the 2026 Winter Olympics, the first edition with NHL participation since 2014. He was also selected as one of the team's alternate captains. Canada reached the final against the United States, where Makar scored the game-tying goal in the second period, but the Americans ultimately prevailed 2–1 in overtime to win the gold medal. He was named to the Olympic All-Star Team.

== Personal life ==
Makar is the son of Gary Makar and Laura MacGregor. He was named after former NHL player Cale Hulse. His younger brother Taylor is a prospect for the Avalanche after signing a one-year, entry-level contract on March 31, 2025, after spending three years with the Minutemen, and was also drafted by the Avalanche in the seventh round of the 2021 NHL entry draft. Makar's cousin, Mark Logan, played from 2015 to 2019 at the Rochester Institute of Technology. Tom Lysiak was his father's cousin. He is of Ukrainian descent on his father's side. Growing up, he was a fan of the hometown Calgary Flames.

Makar married his longtime girlfriend, Tracy Evans, in August 2024. The couple has twin sons who were born in October 2026.

== Career statistics ==
=== Regular season and playoffs ===
			Regular season					Playoffs
Season	Team	League	GP	G	A	Pts	PIM	GP	G	A	Pts	PIM
2014–15	Brooks Bandits	AJHL	3	1	4	5	4	20	1	6	7	4
2015–16	Brooks Bandits	AJHL	54	10	45	55	28	13	3	11	14	0
2016–17	Brooks Bandits	AJHL	54	24	51	75	18	13	5	11	16	4
2017–18	UMass-Amherst	HE	34	5	16	21	20	—	—	—	—	—
2018–19	UMass-Amherst	HE	41	16	33	49	31	—	—	—	—	—
2018–19	Colorado Avalanche	NHL	—	—	—	—	—	10	1	5	6	0
2019–20	Colorado Avalanche	NHL	57	12	38	50	12	15	4	11	15	0
2020–21	Colorado Avalanche	NHL	44	8	36	44	12	10	2	8	10	2
2021–22	Colorado Avalanche	NHL	77	28	58	86	26	20	8	21	29	10
2022–23	Colorado Avalanche	NHL	60	17	49	66	30	6	1	4	5	6
2023–24	Colorado Avalanche	NHL	77	21	69	90	16	11	5	10	15	0
2024–25	Colorado Avalanche	NHL	80	30	62	92	14	7	1	4	5	2
2025–26	Colorado Avalanche	NHL	75	20	59	79	24	11	4	1	5	4
NHL totals			470	136	371	507	134	90	26	64	90	24

=== International ===
Year	Team	Event	Result	GP	G	A	Pts	PIM
2015	Canada West	WJAC	1st place, gold medalist(s)	4	1	0	1	0
2016	Canada West	WJAC	5th	4	4	4	8	0
2018	Canada	WJC	1st place, gold medalist(s)	7	3	5	8	0
2025	Canada	4NF	1st place, gold medalist(s)	3	0	1	1	0
2026	Canada	OG	2nd place, silver medalist(s)	6	2	4	6	2
Junior totals				15	8	9	17	0
Senior totals				9	2	5	7	2

== Awards and honours ==
Award	Year	Ref
AMHL
First All-Star Team	2015	
AJHL
South All-Rookie Team	2016	
South All-Star Team	2016	
Rookie of the Year	2016	
CJHL Rookie of the Year	2016	
RBC Roland Mercier Trophy (MVP)	2016, 2017	
RBC Top Defenceman	2016, 2017	
RBC Top Scorer	2016	
Most Outstanding Defenceman	2017	
MVP	2017	
Playoff MVP	2017	
RBC CJHL Player of the Year	2017	
College
Hockey East All-Rookie Team	2018	
Hockey East Third All-Star Team	2018	
New England Rookie of the Year	2018	
Hockey East Scoring Champion	2019	
Hockey East First All-Star Team	2019	
Hockey East Player of the Year (unanimous)	2019	
AHCA First Team All-American	2019	
Hobey Baker Award	2019	
New England Best Defenceman	2019	
New England Player of the Year	2019	
New England All-Star	2019	
CHN Player of the Year	2019	
All-CHN First Team	2019	
USCHO Player of the Year	2019	
NCAA Northeast Regional MVP	2019	
UMass Male Athlete of the Year	2019	
NHL
Calder Memorial Trophy	2020	
NHL All-Rookie Team	2020	
NHL First All-Star Team	2021, 2022, 2025, 2026	
NHL Second All-Star Team	2023, 2024	
NHL All-Star Game	2022, 2023, 2024	
James Norris Memorial Trophy	2022, 2025	
Conn Smythe Trophy	2022	
Stanley Cup champion	2022	
EA Sports NHL cover athlete	2024	
International
World Junior Championship All-Star Team	2018	
Winter Olympics All-Star Team	2026	

== Records ==
=== NHL ===
- Fastest to 200 points by a defenceman (195 games)

==== Colorado Avalanche ====
- Most career goals by a defenceman (116)
- Most career assists by a defenceman (312)
- Most career points by a defenceman (428)
- Most goals by a rookie defenceman (12, in 2019–20)
- Most assists by a rookie defenceman (38, in 2019–20)
- Most points by a rookie defenceman (50, in 2019–20)
- Longest assist streak (13 games, in 2021–22)
- Most points by a player in a single playoff game (5 in 2022, tied with two others)
- Most assists in a playoff year (21, in 2021-22)
- Most assists by a defenceman in a single season (69, in 2023–24)
- Most goals by a defenceman in a single season (30 in 2024–25)
- Most points by a defenceman in a single season (92 in 2024–25)

=== Olympics ===
- Most points by a Canadian defenceman during a single Olympic tournament with NHL players (6 in 2026, tied with 4)

Awards and achievements
Preceded by Tyson Jost	Colorado Avalanche first-round draft pick 2017	Succeeded by Martin Kaut
Preceded by Adam Gaudette	Hockey East Player of the Year; 2018–19	Succeeded by Jeremy Swayman
Preceded by Adam Gaudette	Hobey Baker Award; 2018–19	Succeeded by Scott Perunovich
Preceded by Elias Pettersson	Calder Memorial Trophy winner 2020	Succeeded by Kirill Kaprizov
Preceded by Adam Fox; Quinn Hughes	James Norris Memorial Trophy winner 2022; 2025	Succeeded by Erik Karlsson; Zach Werenski
Preceded by Andrei Vasilevskiy	Conn Smythe Trophy winner 2022	Succeeded by Jonathan Marchessault
