= Alexandar Georgiev =

Russian ice hockey player (born 1996)

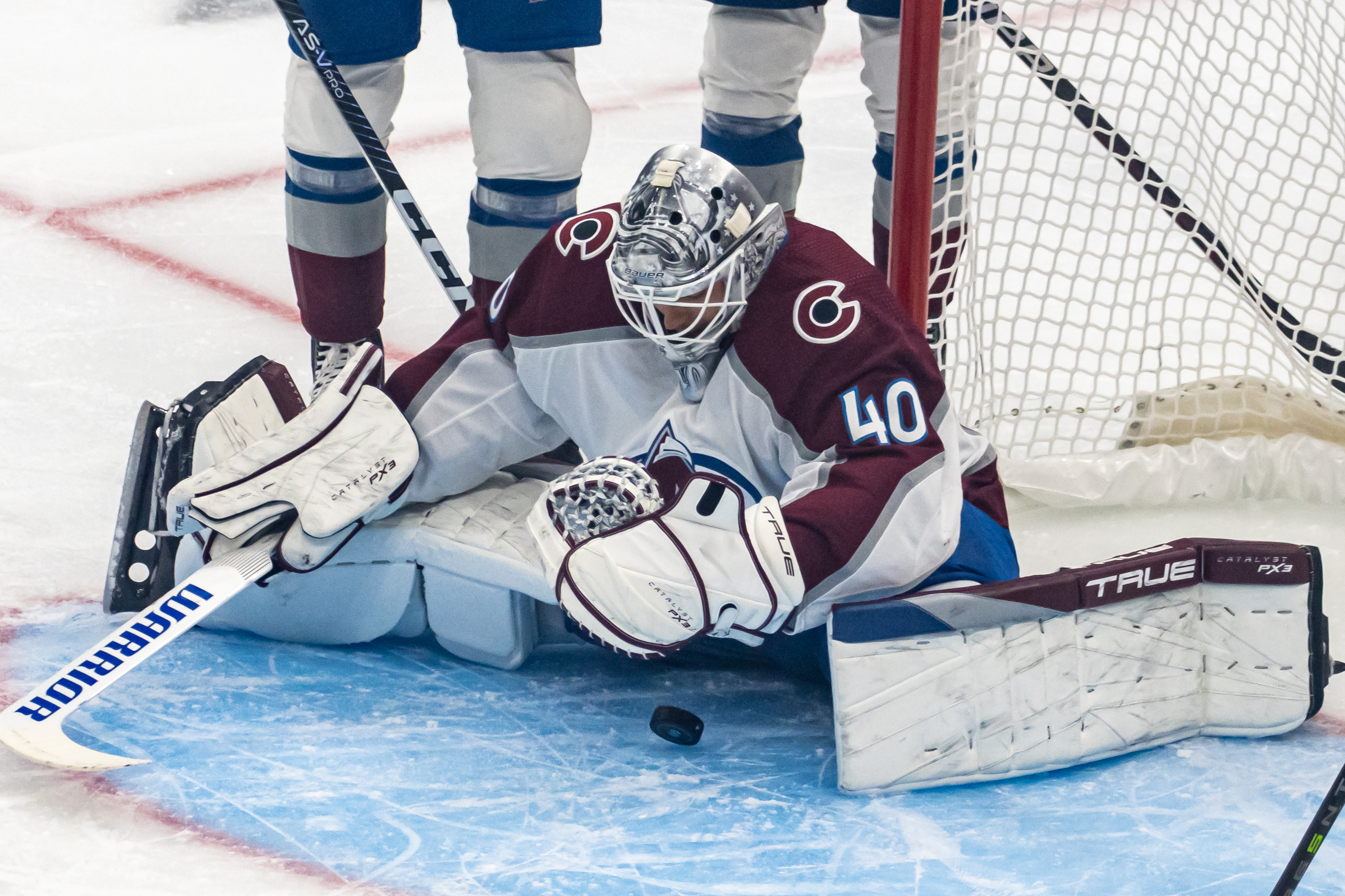
- Georgiev with the Colorado Avalanche in 2023
- Born: 10 February 1996 (age 30) Ruse, Bulgaria
- Height: 6 ft 1 in (185 cm)
- Weight: 180 lb (82 kg; 12 st 12 lb)
- Position: Goaltender
- Catches: Left
- team Former teams: Free agent TPS; New York Rangers; Colorado Avalanche; San Jose Sharks; Spartak Moscow
- National team: Russia
- NHL draft: Undrafted
- Playing career: 2014–present

Alexandar Georgiyevich Georgiev (Russian: Александр Георгиевич Георгиев; born 10 February 1996) is a Bulgarian-born Russian professional ice hockey goaltender who is currently an unrestricted free agent. He most recently played for Spartak Moscow of the Kontinental Hockey League (KHL). An undrafted player, Georgiev previously played in the National Hockey League (NHL) for the New York Rangers, Colorado Avalanche, and San Jose Sharks, as well as in the Liiga for TPS. He is the first Bulgarian-born player to play in the NHL.

== Playing career ==
Born in Bulgaria, Georgiev started playing hockey in Russia, where his family moved shortly after he was born; he is a dual citizen of both countries. He started playing for the Moscow-based Penguins, then moved to Voskresensk to play for Khimik Voskresensk, and later to Finland. Georgiev made his Liiga debut playing with TPS during the 2014–15 season.

Despite two standout seasons with TPS showing developmental promise, Georgiev went undrafted through the 2017 NHL entry draft. With an ambition to play in North America, Georgiev was invited to participate in the New York Rangers' developmental camp. In impressing through his performances, on 18 July 2017, he agreed to a three-year, entry-level contract with the Rangers. On 22 February 2018, Georgiev made his NHL debut where he made 38 saves as the Rangers lost 3–1 to the Montreal Canadiens. On 3 March, Georgiev stopped 35 shots and earned his first NHL win as the Rangers beat the Edmonton Oilers 3–2.

On 21 November 2018, Georgiev recorded his first career NHL shutout, winning 5–0 against the New York Islanders. On 10 February 2019, Georgiev made a career-high 55 saves in a 4–1 win over the Toronto Maple Leafs, becoming the goaltender with second-most saves in a game in Rangers' history, while also setting a record for most saves in regulation. In a 3 March game against the Washington Capitals, Georgiev threw his stick at the puck after forward Alexander Ovechkin had faked him out. Officials originally called it a no goal, but changed the call after reviewing it, granting a 3–2 shootout win to the Capitals.

On 7 July 2022, the negotiating rights to Georgiev were traded to the Colorado Avalanche in exchange for third-round and fifth-round picks in the 2022 NHL entry draft and third-round pick in the 2023 NHL entry draft. As a pending restricted free agent he quickly agreed to terms on a three-year, $10.2 million contract with the Avalanche on 10 July 2022. He had a career year in his first season with his new team, leading the league in wins with 40. He did this a consecutive time in 2023–24, logging 38 wins for the Avalanche.

Georgiev was traded by the Avalanche alongside fellow Russian Nikolai Kovalenko, a 2025 conditional fifth-round pick and a second-round pick in the 2026 NHL entry draft, to the San Jose Sharks in exchange for Mackenzie Blackwood, Givani Smith and a fifth-round pick in the 2027 NHL draft on 9 December 2024.

On 12 September 2025, he signed a one-year contract with the Buffalo Sabres. However, just over two months later, on 23 November 2025, Georgiev was placed on waivers for the purpose of contract termination. Two days later, on 25 November, Georgiev officially signed a two-year contract with Spartak Moscow of the Kontinental Hockey League (KHL), playing in Russia for the first time in his career. Georgiev made 24 appearances in his first season in the KHL, posting 12 wins and 2.37 goals against average for Spartak. In the off-season, Georgiev opted on his own initiative to terminate the remaining season of his contract with Spartak on 2 June 2026.

== Career statistics ==
=== Regular season and playoffs ===
Bold indicates led league

			Regular season									Playoffs
Season	Team	League	GP	W	L	OT	MIN	GA	SO	GAA	SV%	GP	W	L	MIN	GA	SO	GAA	SV%
2014–15	TPS	Jr. A	25	—	—	—	—	—	—	2.25	.920	12	—	—	—	—	—	2.60	.909
2014–15	TPS	Liiga	14	2	8	2	759	28	2	2.21	.917	—	—	—	—	—	—	—	—
2015–16	TPS	Jr. A	9	—	—	—	—	—	—	2.85	.905	—	—	—	—	—	—	—	—
2015–16	TPS	Liiga	10	3	4	0	395	15	1	2.28	.915	2	0	1	79	5	0	3.78	.857
2015–16	SaPKo	Mestis	13	—	—	—	—	30	—	2.49	.907	—	—	—	—	—	—	—	—
2016–17	TPS	Liiga	27	13	8	4	1555	44	2	1.70	.923	1	0	0	2	0	0	0.00	—
2017–18	Hartford Wolf Pack	AHL	37	14	13	7	2076	103	2	2.98	.909	—	—	—	—	—	—	—	—
2017–18	New York Rangers	NHL	10	4	4	1	515	27	0	3.15	.918	—	—	—	—	—	—	—	—
2018–19	New York Rangers	NHL	33	14	13	4	1875	91	2	2.91	.914	—	—	—	—	—	—	—	—
2018–19	Hartford Wolf Pack	AHL	11	2	9	0	624	38	0	3.66	.883	—	—	—	—	—	—	—	—
2019–20	New York Rangers	NHL	34	17	14	2	1892	96	2	3.04	.910	—	—	—	—	—	—	—	—
2020–21	New York Rangers	NHL	19	8	7	2	974	44	2	2.71	.905	—	—	—	—	—	—	—	—
2021–22	New York Rangers	NHL	33	15	10	2	1746	85	2	2.92	.898	2	0	1	59	2	0	2.03	.935
2022–23	Colorado Avalanche	NHL	62	**40**	16	6	3701	156	5	2.53	.919	7	3	4	415	18	0	2.60	.914
2023–24	Colorado Avalanche	NHL	63	**38**	18	5	3638	183	2	3.02	.897	11	6	5	694	33	0	2.85	.894
2024–25	Colorado Avalanche	NHL	18	8	7	0	941	53	0	3.38	.874	—	—	—	—	—	—	—	—
2024–25	San Jose Sharks	NHL	31	7	19	4	1731	112	0	3.88	.875	—	—	—	—	—	—	—	—
2025–26	Rochester Americans	AHL	2	0	2	0	118	7	0	3.57	.896	—	—	—	—	—	—	—	—
2025–26	Spartak Moscow	KHL	24	12	10	2	1419	56	2	2.37	.918	5	1	4	317	14	0	2.65	.918
Liiga totals			51	18	20	6	2,709	87	5	1.93	.920	3	0	1	81	5	0	3.70	.857
NHL totals			303	151	108	26	17,011	847	15	2.99	.903	20	9	10	1,168	53	0	2.72	.904
KHL totals			24	12	10	2	1,419	56	2	2.37	.918	5	1	4	317	14	0	2.65	.918

Medal record

Ice hockey

Representing Russia

World Championships
Bronze medal – third place	2019 Slovakia	

World Junior Championships
Silver medal – second place	2016 Finland	

=== International ===
Year	Team	Event	Result	GP	W	L	OT	MIN	GA	SO	GAA	SV%
2016	Russia	WJC	2nd place, silver medalist(s)	5	4	0	1	310	13	0	2.52	.898
2019	Russia	WC	3rd place, bronze medalist(s)	2	2	0	0	120	0	2	0.00	1.000
Junior totals				5	4	0	1	310	13	0	2.52	.898
Senior totals				2	2	0	0	120	0	2	0.00	1.000

== Awards and honours ==
Award	Year
Liiga
Best GAA (1.70)	2017
NHL
NHL All-Star Game	2024
