= J. T. Miller =

American ice hockey player (born 1993)

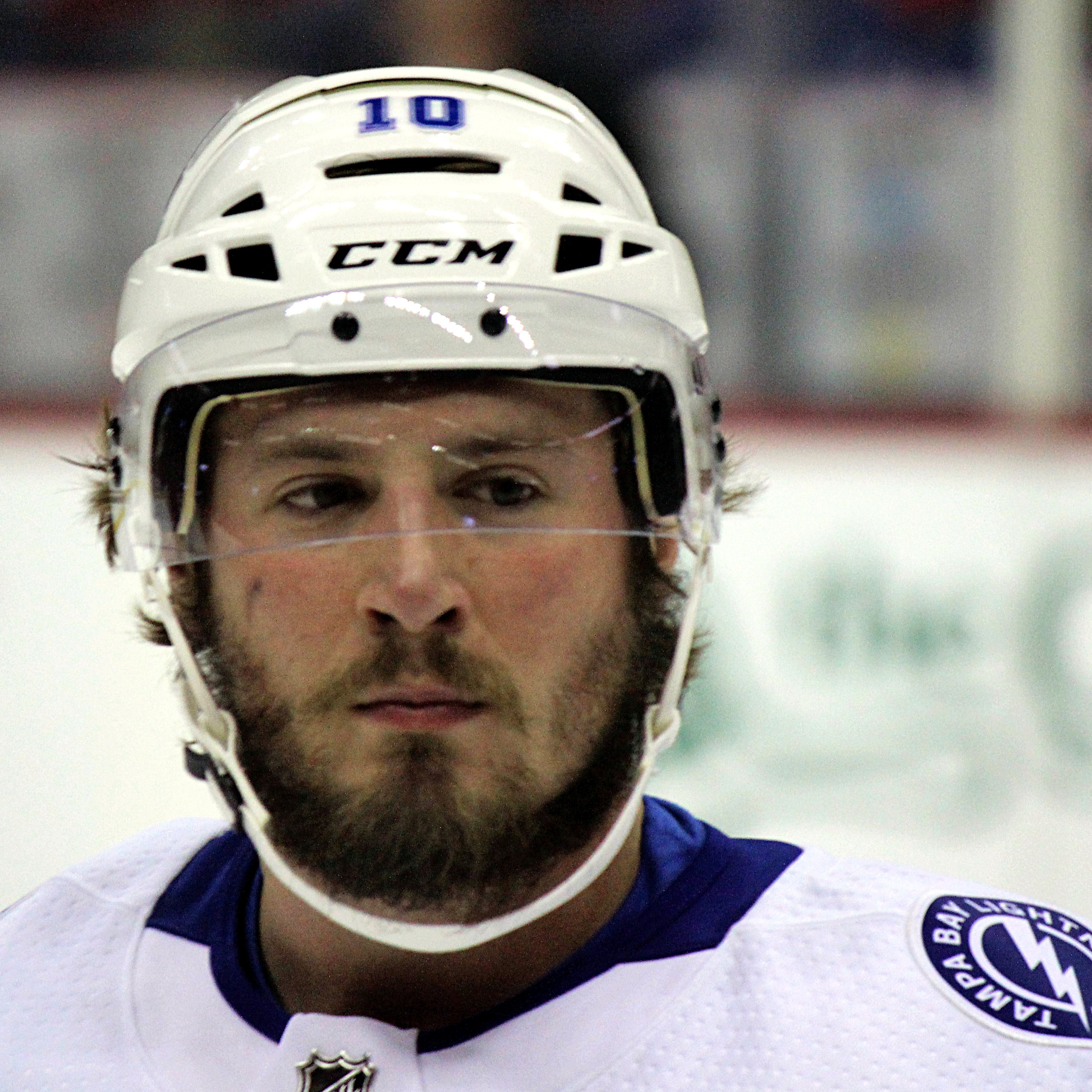
- Miller with the Tampa Bay Lightning
- Born: March 14, 1993 (age 33) East Palestine, Ohio, U.S.
- Height: 6 ft 1 in (185 cm)
- Weight: 218 lb (99 kg; 15 st 8 lb)
- Position: Forward
- Shoots: Left
- NHL team Former teams: New York Rangers; Tampa Bay Lightning; Vancouver Canucks
- National team: United States
- NHL draft: 15th overall, 2011; New York Rangers
- Playing career: 2012–present

Jonathan Tanner Miller (born March 14, 1993) is an American professional ice hockey player who is a forward and captain for the New York Rangers of the National Hockey League (NHL). He was drafted by the Rangers in the first round, 15th overall, of the 2011 NHL entry draft. He has also played for the Tampa Bay Lightning and the Vancouver Canucks.

== Early life ==
Miller was born on March 14, 1993, in East Palestine, Ohio. He was enrolled in the East Palestine City School District and attended public school from kindergarten through 10th grade. He began playing ice hockey at a young age and also participated in other organized athletics, including baseball and football. Miller played for several ice hockey teams from the age of five through 12 before ending up with the Pittsburgh Hornets from age 12 to age 16, as at the time his family was living in the Pittsburgh suburb of Coraopolis. Miller played in the 2006 Quebec International Pee-Wee Hockey Tournament with the Pittsburgh Hornets minor ice hockey team.

== Playing career ==
=== Amateur ===
Miller began the 2009–10 season with the U.S. NTDP of the United States Hockey League (USHL). After two seasons playing in the program, he was selected in the first round, 15th overall, of the 2011 NHL entry draft by the New York Rangers. The following day, Miller signed a contract to play major junior ice hockey with the Plymouth Whalers of the Ontario Hockey League (OHL).

=== Professional ===
==== New York Rangers (2011–2018) ====
Since Miller was drafted by the Rangers from the USHL, he was eligible to join their American Hockey League (AHL) affiliate, the Connecticut Whale, as a teenager. He joined the Whale for their run in the 2012 Calder Cup playoffs once his first major junior season concluded. He recorded his first professional point, an assist, in the Whale's Game 1 3–2 overtime win against the Norfolk Admirals. He finished the AHL postseason with one goal over eight games. After the Whale were eliminated, Miller was added to the Rangers roster for the 2012 Stanley Cup playoffs but did not play a single game.

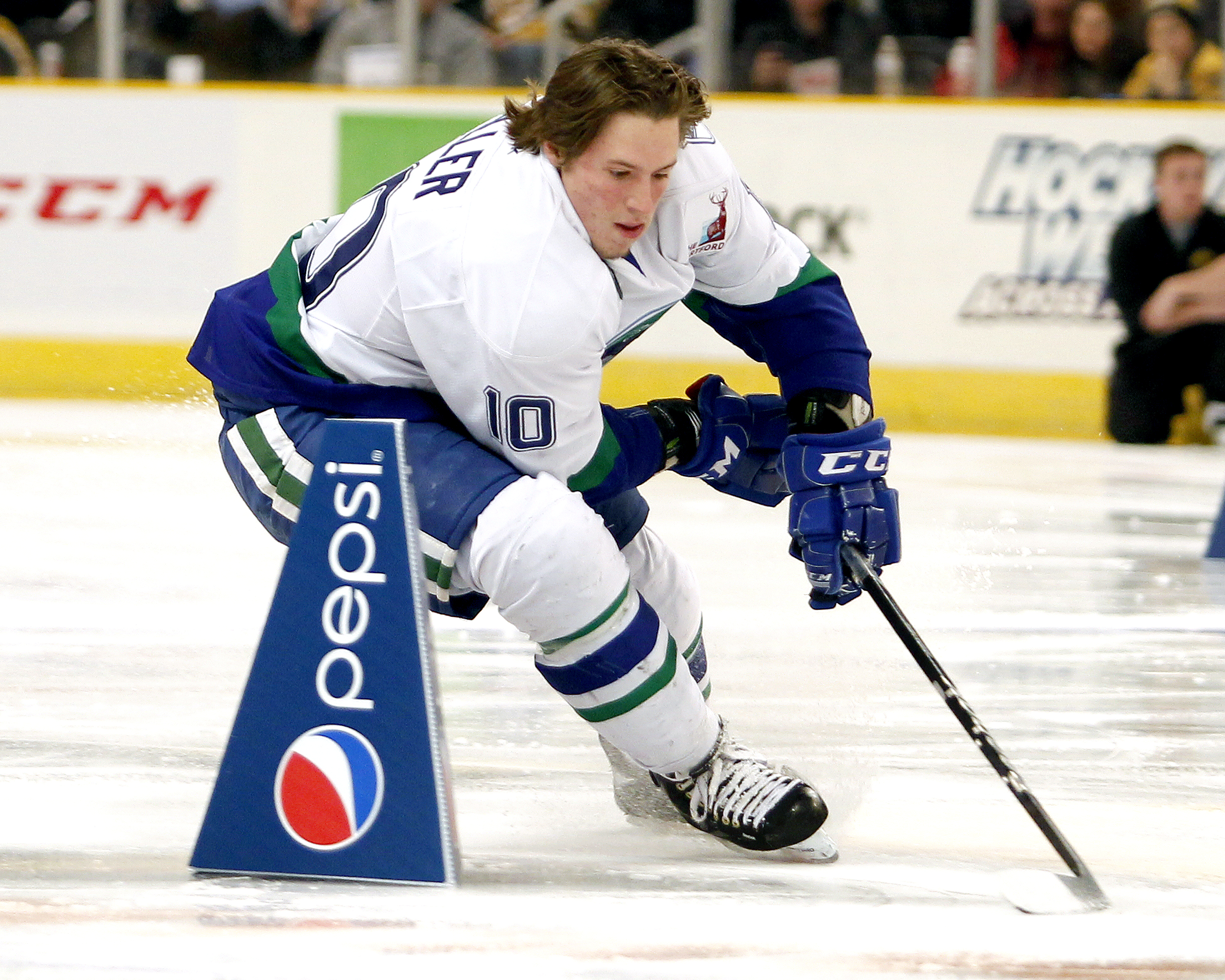
Miller at the 2013 AHL All-Star Skills Competition

Miller returned to the Whale for their training camp before the start of their 2012–13 season. As one of the youngest players in the league, Miller started the season with three assists over three games. He also registered three goals and four assists through a seven-game span between December 1 and December 14. He scored 16 points through his first 32 games before joining Team USA for the 2013 World Junior Ice Hockey Championships. While Rangers assistant general manager Jeff Gorton acknowledged Miller's slow adjustment period, he praised the forward's improvements. After returning from the 2013 World Junior Championships with a gold medal, Miller became the youngest player named to the 2013 AHL All-Star Game. When he was recalled to the NHL level on February 4, 2013, Miller was tied for sixth on the Whale with eight goals and 20 points.

Miller made his NHL debut on February 5, 2013, against the New Jersey Devils and recorded two shots on net. After being kept pointless in his debut, he tallied his first two NHL goals at Madison Square Garden on February 7 against the New York Islanders. He subsequently became the first Rangers player to register a multi-goal game in his Madison Square Garden debut since Chris Kontos in 1983, and the youngest player in franchise history to tally a multi-goal game since Alex Kovalev in 1992. Due to the NHL Collective Bargaining Agreement, the Rangers had five games to decide whether they would send Miller down or burn off a year of his contract. After choosing to keep him at the NHL level, Miller recorded two goals and two assists over 26 games. Before he returned to the AHL in April, head coach John Tortorella praised him for his ability to swiftly adapt to playing at the NHL level at a young age. Miller finished the season with eight goals and 15 assists for 23 points through 42 games. He ranked third among team rookies in assists, tied for third in points and ranked fourth in goals. After the Whale's season concluded, Miller was added to the Rangers roster for the 2013 Stanley Cup playoffs, but did not play in a game.

Over the 2013 offseason, the Rangers replaced Tortorella as head coach with Alain Vigneault. Miller returned to the Rangers 2013 training camp out of shape and suffered a hamstring injury during conditioning laps. He began the 2013-14 season with the Rangers AHL affiliate, the Hartford Wolf Pack. In his season debut on October 5, he scored two goals and an assist. Under Vigneault, Miller consistently fell down the line-up and was reassigned to the AHL six different times through the 2013–14 season. While Miller later credited Vigneault for helping him develop maturely as a player and as an individual, he acknowledges that he "wasn’t the most coachable" as a 20-year-old. Through 30 games with the Rangers, Miller had recorded three goals and three assists. Before demoting Miller for the final time of the regular season, Vigneault called him out and said he needed to see "more commitment."

Miller finished his second season with the Wolf Pack with 15 goals and 28 assists for 43 points. He was recalled to the Rangers on April 14 to join their roster for the 2014 Stanley Cup playoffs. He made his debut in Game 5 of the Eastern Conference first round against the Philadelphia Flyers. In his debut, he recorded an assist on Brad Richards goal in the second period to help the Rangers win 4–2. Miller played in three more playoff games, and added two assists, before suffering an injury in Game 4 of the Eastern Conference finals.

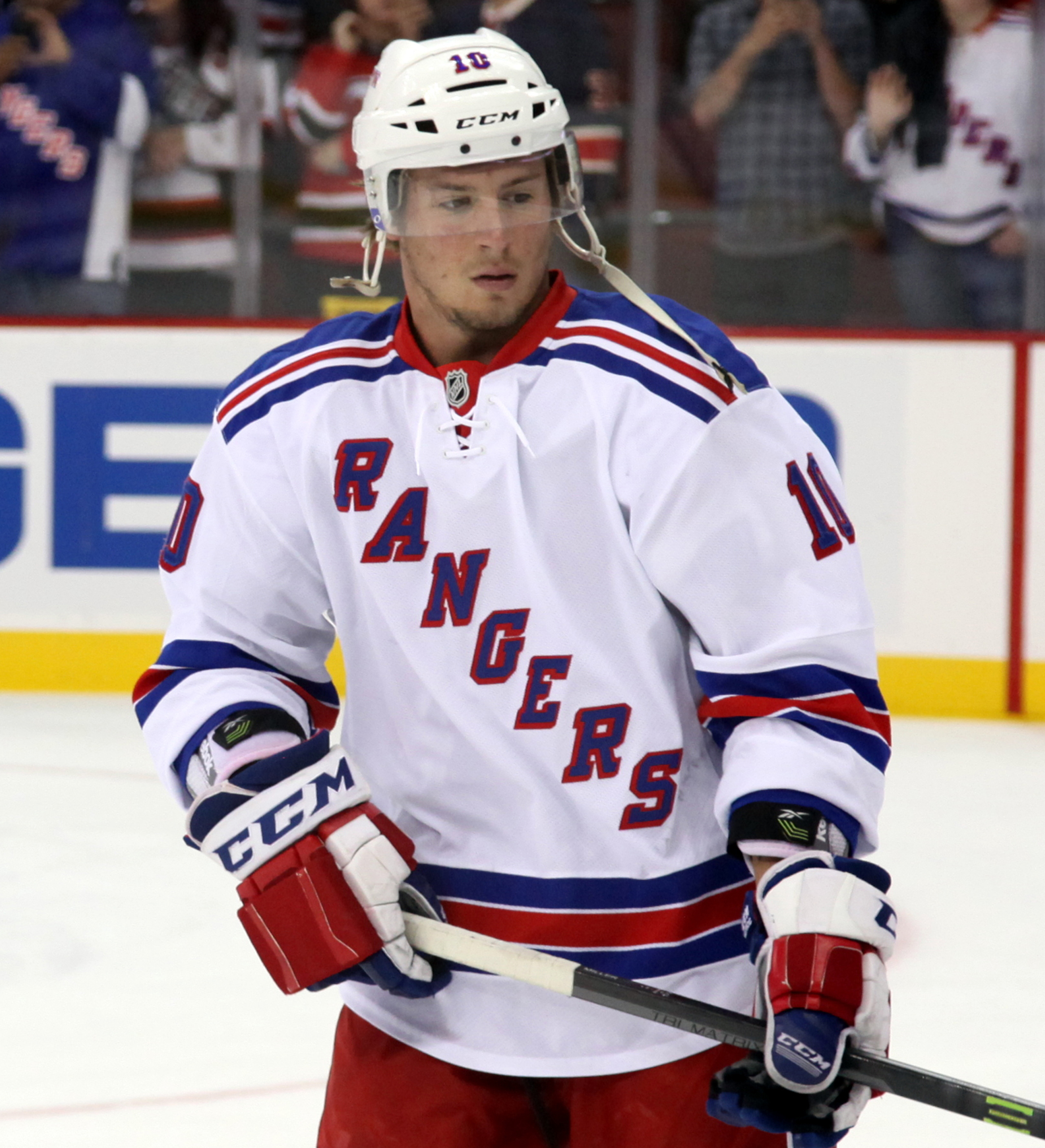
Miller with the Rangers in October 2014

Unlike the previous season, Miller returned to New York six weeks before training camp began to stay in shape. He was named to the Rangers' opening night roster but was reassigned to the AHL after going pointless through three games. Upon joining the Wolf Pack, Miller registered six goals and nine assists through 18 games. Due to an injury to Chris Kreider, Miller was promoted from the AHL on November 28, 2014 and shifted from centre to wing. Over his first four games as the Rangers second line winger, he tallied two goals. While he was a healthy scratch five times through February 4, 2015, his confidence as a player grew and he began earning the coaching staff's trust. This trust allowed him to play alongside a variety of teammates including Carl Hagelin and Kevin Hayes. Miller was put with Hayes and Hagelin due to an injury to Jesper Fast in early February, and they combined for 27 points through their first 16 games. When Martin St. Louis was sidelined due to an injury in late March, Miller was promoted the Rangers' second line with Derek Stepan and Kredier. Over the four games St. Louis missed, Miller scored the game-winning assist and game-winning goal in two separate games. His game-winning goal on April 2 allowed the Rangers to clinch first place in the Eastern Conference and set a new franchise record for most road wins in a season. Miller concluded the regular season with a career-high 10 goals and 13 assists.

Due to their regular season success, Miller remained on the Rangers' second line to open Game 1 of the 2015 Stanley Cup playoffs against the Pittsburgh Penguins. After going pointless in Game 1, Miller tallied his first playoff point in Game 2 with an assist on Stepan's first period goal. The trio were split up in the Eastern Conference second round against the Washington Capitals. After losing Game 1, Vigneault promoted Jesper Fast and demoted Miller to play with Hayes and Carl Hagelin. Miller assisted on Hayes' second period goal in Game 7 to help the Rangers advance to the Eastern Conference Finals. After the Rangers lost Game 2 of the Conference Finals, Vigneault moved Miller onto a line with Derick Brassard and Rick Nash late in Game 3. They remained a unit through Games 4 and 5 before breaking out in Game 6 with a combined total of five goals and 13 points. This marked the first time in franchise history that three players had receded four or more points in the same game. After the Rangers were eliminated in Game 7, Miller finished the playoffs with one goal and seven assists through 19 games. On July 15, Miller agreed to a one-year contract extension with the Rangers.

After signing the new contract, Miller spent the entirety of the 2015–16 season with the Rangers for the first time in his NHL career. Due to his versatile play, Vigneault was able to play him at centre, right wing, and left wing positions when needed. While Miller experienced lengthy scoring droughts throughout the season, he finished with new career-highs in goals, assists, and points. Although Miller played on the Ranger's top line during the preseason, Vigneault demoted him to the fourth line with Oscar Lindberg and Viktor Stalberg in favor of Hayes. Miller started the season by setting a new personal record for most points in a regular-season period. While he struggled to score goals his responsible style of play earned him Vigneault's trust and was promoted to the Rangers' second line in November. After recording only one goal through 14 games in November, assistant coach Darryl Williams spoke to Miller about finding consistency. Following this conversation, Miller said he "resorted to playing hard and keeping it simple."

By the start of January, Miller had started 16 games as the third line left wing, centered the third line once, and played on its right wing seven times. He eventually settled onto the Rangers third line with Mats Zuccarello and Derick Brassard. Upon joining this line, Miller began to see an uptick in scoring and quickly recorded five goals over six games from January 17 to January 25. Brassard and Miller remained together on the Ranger's third line, but Zuccarello was replaced with Jespeer Fast at the beginning of February. At this time, Miller had recorded eight goals through eight games and 16 points overall. By February 12, Miller had already established new career highs with 17 goals, 30 points, and five game-winning goals. However, following a demotion to the Ranger's fourth line in early March, the Miller-Brassard-Zuccarello line only played together once over the final 16 games of the regular season. He finished the regular season with a career-high 22 goals, 21 assists, and 43 points through 82 games. In the 2016 Stanley Cup playoffs, Miller recorded no goals and three assists in their five-game first-round loss to the Penguins. He signed a two-year, $5.5 million contract extension with the Rangers on July 13, 2016.

Due to his play in previous years, Vigneault started Miller on the Rangers' regular penalty-kill unit for the first time to begin the 2016–17 season. Miller shifted positions numerous times throughout October but typically played as a left winger. He registered a point in six of the Rangers' first nine games and tied his single-game career-high with three points on October 30. At the end of October and into November, Miller was reunited on a line with Hayes and Grabner. Over their first five games together, they combined for 12 goals and 11 assists. On November 6, 2016, Miller became the first Rangers player to record 12 or more assists in the team's first 16 games since Vinny Prospal in 2009. By December 1, Miller had recorded a point in 14 of the Rangers' 16 wins and was tied for the team lead with 19 points overall. In response to Vigneault demoting him to the fourth line on December 27, he scored seven goals and 20 points over 16 games. He described the demotion as a "wake up call" and was soon reunited with Hayes and Grabner. However, his lack of consistency was again critiqued by Vigneault as he went through another goalless drought in February and March. Miller finished the regular-season leading all Rangers in goals with 22 and ranked third with 34 assists. His efforts helped the Rangers qualify for the 2017 Stanley Cup playoffs, where they faced the Montreal Canadiens for the first time since 2014. Over their first round series, Miller played alongside Hayes and Mats Zuccarello. He struggled to match his regular-season prowess and went pointless through the first five games of the series. His first point of the playoffs was an assist on Zuccarello's second goal in Game 6 to help the Rangers qualify for the Eastern Conference second round. Miller added two more assists over the Rangers' six game series against the Ottawa Senators for a total of three points.

Due to an offseason trade, the Rangers planned on moving Miller into a centre position on their third line for the 2017–18 season. However, Vigneault later announced that Miller would start the season in his usual winger position due to the impressive play of other centers at training camp. He was subsequently reunited on a line with Hayes and Grabner. In his 200th regular-season game on October 8, Miller notched an assist on the game-winning goal to lift the Rangers over the Canadiens. He tallied one goal and six assists over the final eight games of October to finish the month with a total of 10 points. In mid-November, Miller was moved from wing to center to replace David Desharnais and gained Grabner and Zuccarello as his wingers. He remained in this position until December 22 when he was shifted to right wing alongside Boo Nieves and Paul Carey. By mid-February, Miller ranked second on the team in scoring with 13 goals and 27 assists through 63 games.

==== Tampa Bay Lightning (2018–2019) ====
On February 26, 2018, Miller was traded, along with Ryan McDonagh, to the Tampa Bay Lightning in exchange for Libor Hájek, Brett Howden, Vladislav Namestnikov, a 2018 first-round pick and a conditional 2019 second-round pick. Over his first six games with the Lightning, Miller tallied four points and was promoted to the team's top line. While playing on this line, Miller scored his first NHL hat trick in a loss to the Ottawa Senators on March 13. Miller scored the game-winning goal against the New York Islanders on March 22 to help the Lightning break their franchise record for most goals in a season. At the time, Miller had recorded seven goals with the Lightning through 11 games. He finished the regular season with a total of 23 goals and 35 assists for a career-high 58 points.

His efforts helped the Lightning quality for the 2018 Stanley Cup playoffs, where they faced the New Jersey Devils in the Eastern Conference first round. In Game 4, Miller scored his first goal of the postseason, and second of his career, and added two assists. He finished the series with four points as the Lightning advanced to the Eastern Conference second round against the Boston Bruins. The Lightning's top line, consisting of Miller, Steven Stamkos, and Nikita Kucherov, struggled with scoring through the first two games of the series. Miller scored his second goal of the playoffs, and first game-winner, in Game 5 to lead the Lightning to a 4–1 series win over the Bruins. He remained on the Lightning's top line through Games 1 and 2 of the Eastern Conference finals but was demoted to their third line for Game 3. Once the Lightning were eliminated from the playoffs, Miller signed a five-year, $26.25 million contract to remain with the team on June 26.

Miller returned to the Lightning's top line with Stamkos and Kucherov to start the 2018–19 season. On October 31, he recorded his 200th NHL point, an assist, in an 8–3 win over the New Jersey Devils. Following a game against the Philadelphia Flyers on December 27, Miller was placed on long term injured reserve. At the time, Miller had scored seven goals and 19 assists for 26 points. He returned to the Lightning's lineup on January 12, 2019 after missing six games with an upper-body injury. Despite winning the Presidents' Trophy as the team with the best overall record during the regular season, the Lightning were swept in four games by the Blue Jackets in their first round series.

==== Vancouver Canucks (2019–2025) ====
On June 22, 2019, Miller was traded to the Vancouver Canucks in exchange for Marek Mazanec, a 2019 third-round pick and a conditional 2020 first-round pick. Miller began the 2019–20 season with a career-high four points, one goal and three assists, in the Canucks home opener against the Los Angeles Kings. His four points also tied Greg Adams and Tony Tanti's franchise record for points in a home opener. A few games later, Miller became one of nine Canucks players in franchise history to score two power-play goals in one game. On October 28, Miller scored his 100th and 101st career goals in a 7–2 win over the Florida Panthers. He subsequently became the 14th member of the 2011 draft class to reach the 100-goal milestone. Between November 21 and December 7, Miller maintained an eight game point streak. During this streak, Miller scored his 10th goal of the season on November 25, and became the 14th player in franchise history with 24 or more points through his first 25 regular-season games. Through the final week of January, Miller tallied three goals and four assists through four games. The NHL recognized his efforts at the end of the month and he was named one of the NHL's 'Three Stars' of the Week. He continued to collect points through February and tied two franchise records. On March 6, he became the fourth player in franchise history to record 70 points in his first season with the team, and one of three players in franchise history to record at least 20 multi-point games in his first season with the team.

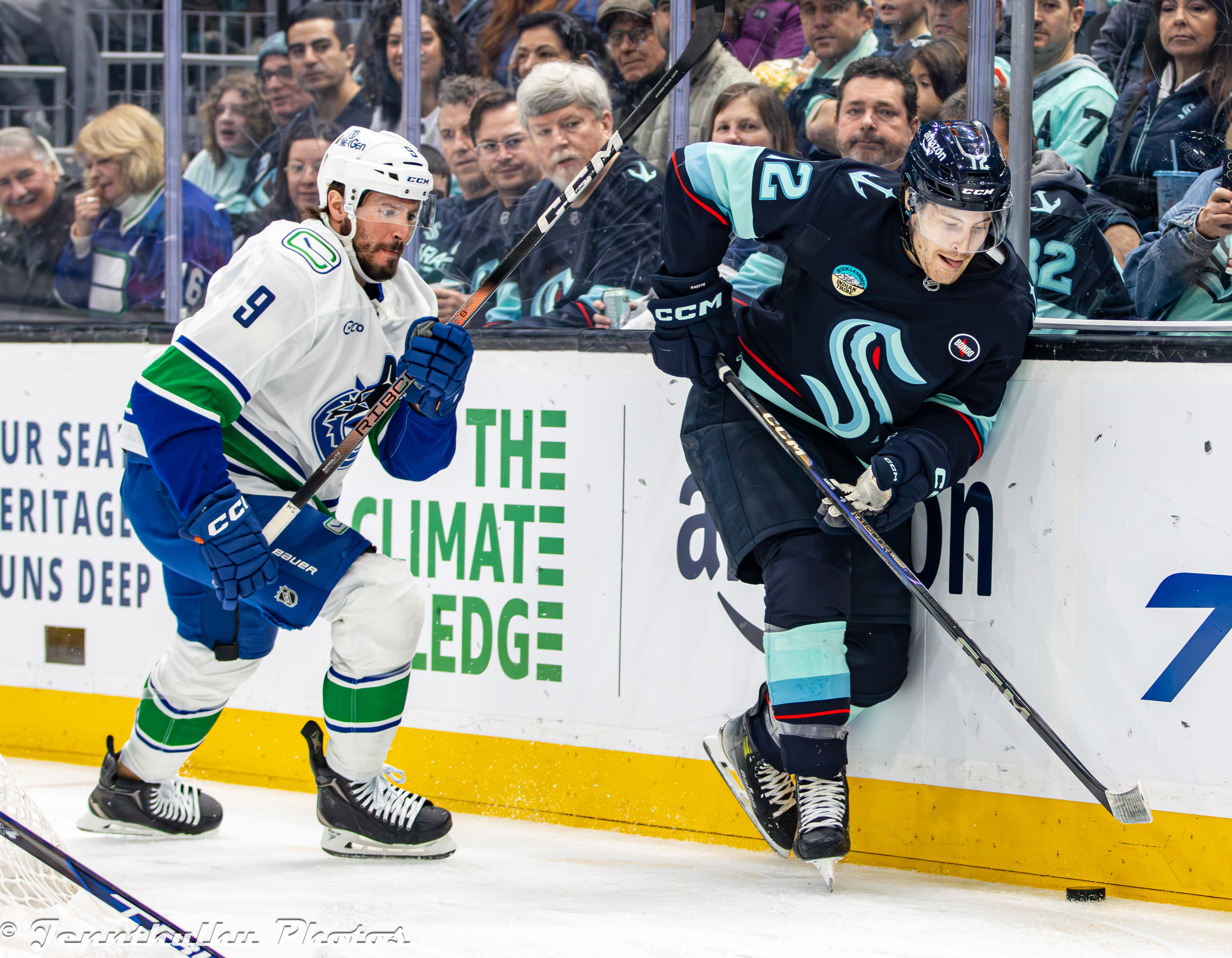
Miller (left) with the Vancouver Canucks during the 2024–25 season

When the NHL returned to play for the 2020 Stanley Cup playoffs, the Canucks moved into the Edmonton bubble along with 11 other Western Conference teams. Following the Western Conference qualifying round, the Canucks faced off against the St. Louis Blues in the first round. Miller tallied a point over the first five games of the series to help the Canucks eliminate the Blues in six games and advance to the second round. He added one goal and seven assists to his points total as the Canucks pushed the Vegas Golden Knights to a Game 7.

When the Canucks began experiencing a COVID-19 breakout in April 2021, Miller raised concerns about the health and safety protocols put into place by the NHL.

On January 25, 2022, Miller was activated off of the Canucks COVID-19 protocol list. Two days later, he recorded his second career hat trick in a 5-1 win over the Winnipeg Jets. On September 2, Miller signed a seven-year, $56 million contract extension with the Canucks. On April 11, 2023, Miller scored his 200th NHL goal during the Canucks' penultimate game of the season, a 3–2 win over the Anaheim Ducks.

Miller set numerous personal records during the 2023–24 season. On January 13, 2024, Miller was named an NHL All-Star for the first time in his career. The following month, he recorded his third career hat-trick in a 10–7 loss to the Minnesota Wild. On April 8, Miller became the seventh player in franchise history to score 100 points in a single season. Two days later, in a game against the Arizona Coyotes, Miller became the second fastest player in franchise history to score 400 points. He finished the season with career-highs in goals, assists, and points.

==== Second stint with Rangers (2025–present) ====
On January 31, 2025, Miller was traded back to the New York Rangers, along with Erik Brännström and Jackson Dorrington, in exchange for Filip Chytil, Victor Mancini, and a 2025 first-round pick. Miller was traded by the Canucks after team president Jim Rutherford acknowledged there had been an ongoing rift between both Miller and Elias Pettersson and that finding a solution might require difficult decisions, potentially including trading one of them.

On September 16, 2025, before the start of the 2025–26 season, Miller was named the 29th captain in Rangers history, succeeding Jacob Trouba.

== International play ==
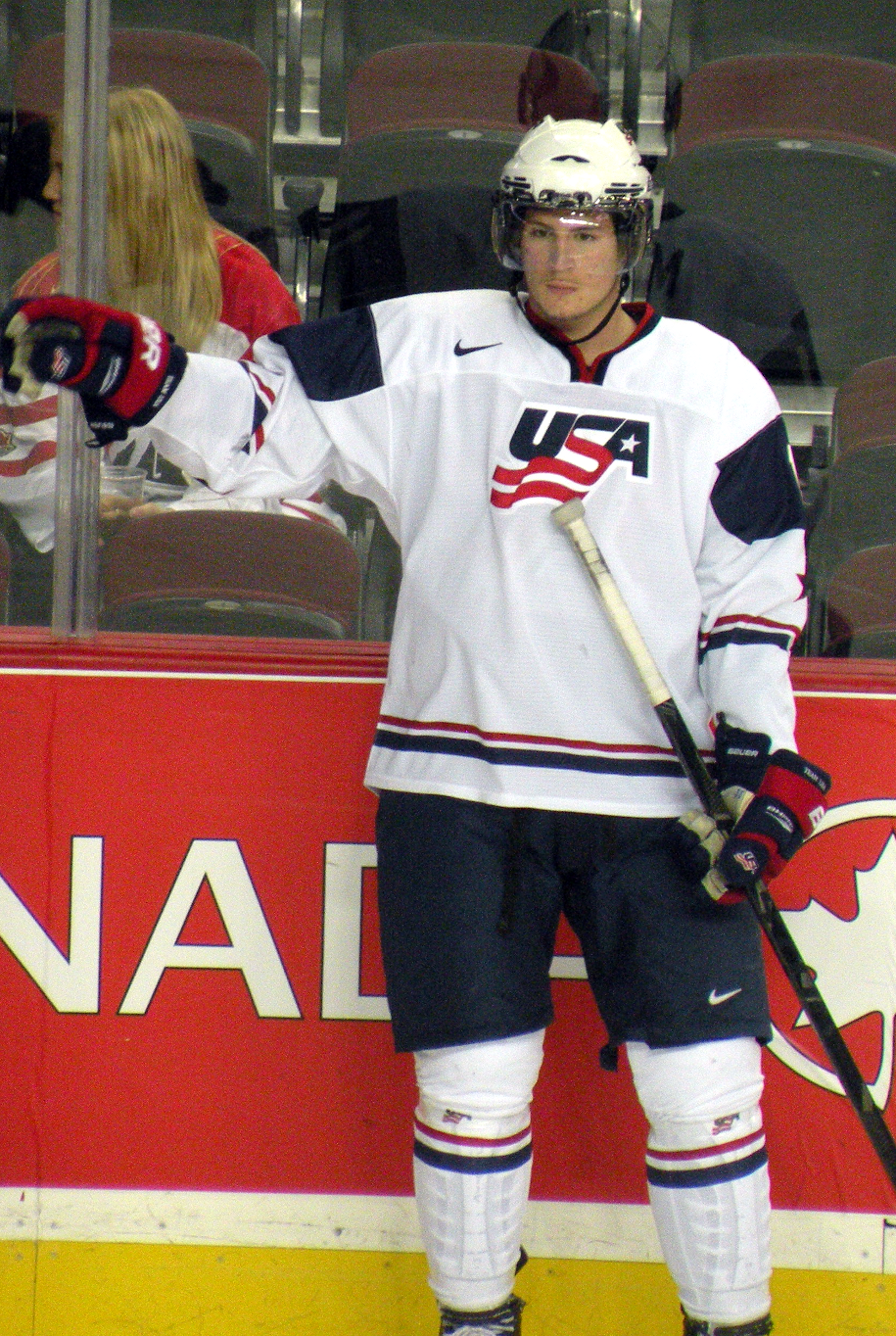
- Miller at the 2012 World Junior Championship

Medal record

Men's ice hockey

Representing the United States

Olympic Games
Gold medal – first place	2026 Milano Cortina	

World Junior Championships
Gold medal – first place	2013 Ufa	

IIHF World U18 Championship
Gold medal – first place	2011 Germany	

World U-17 Hockey Challenge
Gold medal – first place	2010 Ontario	

Miller represented the United States junior team at the 2012 World Junior Championships, where he played in six games, scoring two goals and two assists. He was also selected to represent the United States at the 2013 World Junior Championships, where he led the team with seven assists and tied for the team lead with nine points, winning a gold medal in the process.

Miller represented Team North America, a team consisting of players aged 23 and under, in the 2016 World Cup of Hockey, but only appeared in one game. In February 2025, Miller represented Team USA during the 4-Nations Face-Off tournament.

On January 2, 2026, he was named to Team USA's roster for the 2026 Winter Olympics. Following the announcement, head coach Mike Sullivan defended Millers inclusion stating that Miller was an essential allrounder with skills as a penalty killer, in faceoffs and sound defensive and offensive skills. During the games, Miller and Vincent Trocheck logged the most shorthanded minutes amongst all American forwards, and the US did not allow a power-play goal the entire games.

== Personal life ==
Miller and his wife have two daughters and one son.

Amid online backlash faced by the men's Olympic hockey team regarding the inclusion of FBI director Kash Patel during their gold medal celebrations and members of the team laughing at President Trump's comments of being impeached if he did not invite the women's team to the White House, the team was invited to meet with the president and attend the State of the Union. Miller was among the majority who visited with the president and attended the State of the Union.

== Career statistics ==
=== Regular season and playoffs ===
			Regular season					Playoffs
Season	Team	League	GP	G	A	Pts	PIM	GP	G	A	Pts	PIM
2009–10	U.S. NTDP Juniors	USHL	29	5	7	12	32	—	—	—	—	—
2009–10	U.S. NTDP U17	USDP	17	10	9	19	47	—	—	—	—	—
2009–10	U.S. NTDP U18	USDP	1	0	0	0	0	—	—	—	—	—
2010–11	U.S. NTDP Juniors	USHL	21	3	12	15	48	—	—	—	—	—
2010–11	U.S. NTDP U18	USDP	35	12	23	35	38	—	—	—	—	—
2011-12	Plymouth Whalers	OHL	61	25	37	62	61	13	2	8	10	18
2011–12	Connecticut Whale	AHL	—	—	—	—	—	8	0	1	1	2
2012–13	Connecticut Whale	AHL	42	8	15	23	29	—	—	—	—	—
2012–13	New York Rangers	NHL	26	2	2	4	8	—	—	—	—	—
2013–14	New York Rangers	NHL	30	3	3	6	18	4	0	2	2	2
2013–14	Hartford Wolf Pack	AHL	41	15	28	43	47	—	—	—	—	—
2014–15	Hartford Wolf Pack	AHL	18	6	9	15	12	—	—	—	—	—
2014–15	New York Rangers	NHL	58	10	13	23	23	19	1	7	8	2
2015–16	New York Rangers	NHL	82	22	21	43	46	5	0	3	3	4
2016–17	New York Rangers	NHL	82	22	34	56	21	12	0	3	3	21
2017–18	New York Rangers	NHL	63	13	27	40	28	—	—	—	—	—
2017–18	Tampa Bay Lightning	NHL	19	10	8	18	12	17	2	6	8	15
2018–19	Tampa Bay Lightning	NHL	75	13	34	47	30	4	0	2	2	0
2019–20	Vancouver Canucks	NHL	69	27	45	72	47	17	6	12	18	14
2020–21	Vancouver Canucks	NHL	53	15	31	46	43	—	—	—	—	—
2021–22	Vancouver Canucks	NHL	80	32	67	99	47	—	—	—	—	—
2022–23	Vancouver Canucks	NHL	81	32	50	82	60	—	—	—	—	—
2023–24	Vancouver Canucks	NHL	81	37	66	103	58	13	3	9	12	8
2024–25	Vancouver Canucks	NHL	40	9	26	35	37	—	—	—	—	—
2024–25	New York Rangers	NHL	32	13	22	35	18	—	—	—	—	—
2025–26	New York Rangers	NHL	68	17	36	53	33	—	—	—	—	—
NHL totals			939	277	485	762	529	91	12	44	56	66

=== International ===
Year	Team	Event	Result	GP	G	A	Pts	PIM
2010	United States	U17	1st place, gold medalist(s)	6	5	4	9	28
2011	United States	WJC18	1st place, gold medalist(s)	6	4	9	13	6
2012	United States	WJC	7th	6	2	2	4	0
2013	United States	WJC	1st place, gold medalist(s)	7	2	7	9	2
2016	Team North America	WCH	5th	1	0	0	0	0
2025	United States	4NF	2nd	4	0	0	0	7
2026	United States	OG	1st place, gold medalist(s)	6	0	0	0	0
Junior totals				25	13	22	35	36
Senior totals				11	0	0	0	7

== Awards and honors ==
Award	Year
NHL
NHL All-Star Game	2024
Vancouver Canucks
Fred J. Hume Award	2020
Pavel Bure Most Exciting Player Award	2022
Cyrus H. McLean Trophy	2022
Three Stars Award	2022

Awards and achievements
Preceded by Dylan McIlrath	New York Rangers first-round draft pick 2011	Succeeded by Brady Skjei
Sporting positions
Preceded by Jacob Trouba	New York Rangers captain 2025–present	Incumbent
