= Mathew Barzal =

Canadian ice hockey player (born 1997)

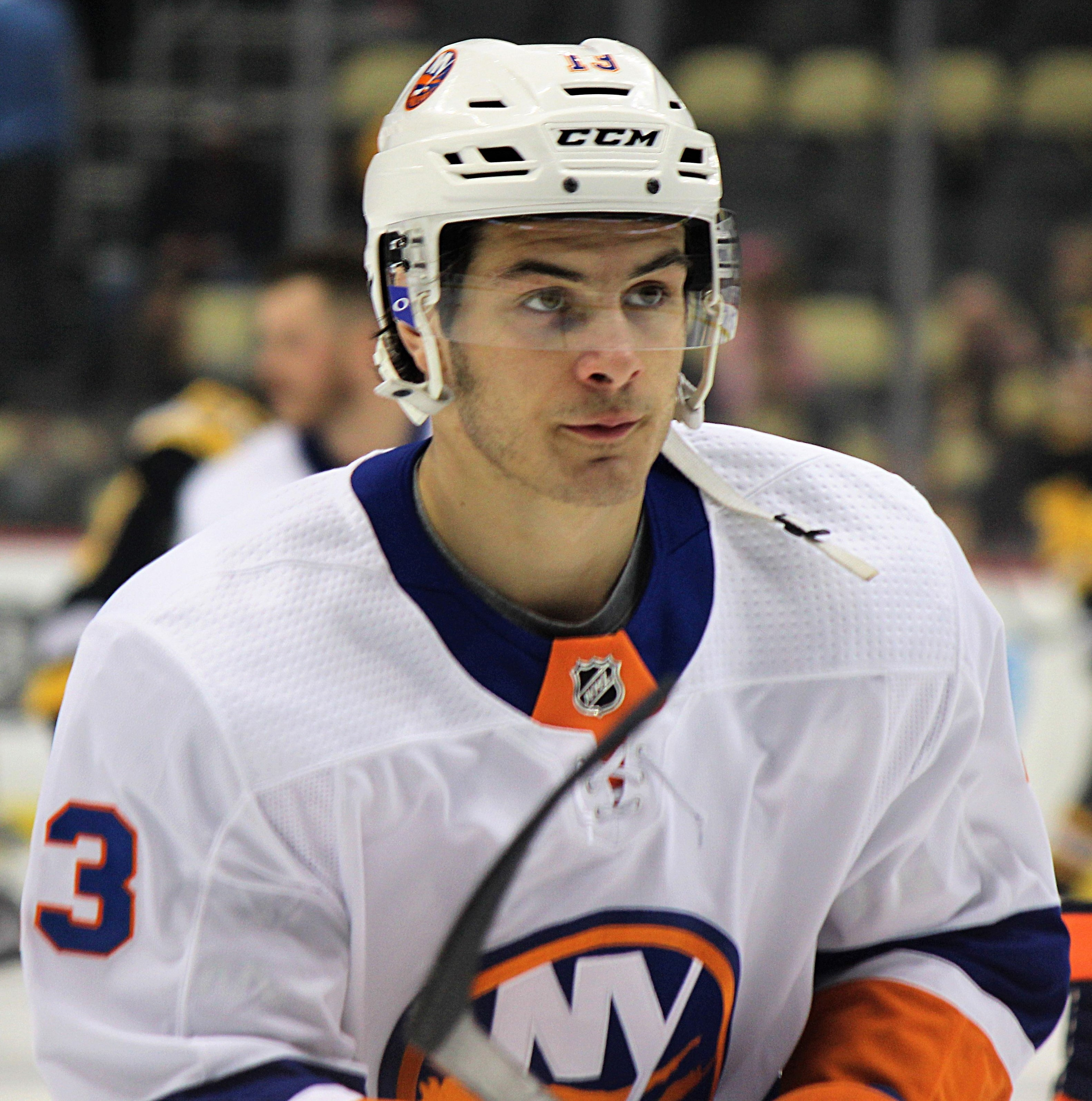
- Barzal with the New York Islanders in March 2018
- Born: May 26, 1997 (age 29) Coquitlam, British Columbia, Canada
- Height: 6 ft 1 in (185 cm)
- Weight: 186 lb (84 kg; 13 st 4 lb)
- Position: Forward
- Shoots: Right
- NHL team: New York Islanders
- National team: Canada
- NHL draft: 16th overall, 2015; New York Islanders
- Playing career: 2016–present

Mathew Michael Paul Barzal (born May 26, 1997) is a Canadian professional ice hockey player who is a forward for the New York Islanders of the National Hockey League (NHL). Barzal was selected by the Islanders in the first round, 16th overall, of the 2015 NHL entry draft. He won the Calder Memorial Trophy as the NHL's top rookie in 2017–18, the fifth Islander to win the award.

== Playing career ==
=== Amateur ===
Barzal played in the 2010 Quebec International Pee-Wee Hockey Tournament with his youth team from Burnaby. He was selected first overall by the Seattle Thunderbirds of the Western Hockey League (WHL) in the 2012 WHL bantam draft. In his rookie season with the Thunderbirds in the 2013–14 season, Barzal scored 14 goals and 40 assists for 54 points. He was ranked seventh in the NHL's midterm rankings ahead of the 2015 NHL entry draft.

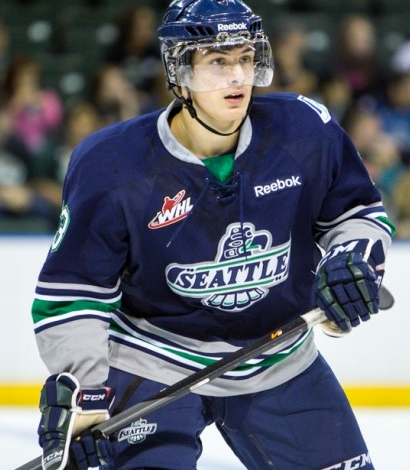
Barzal with the Seattle Thunderbirds in 2015

=== New York Islanders ===
Barzal was selected 16th overall by the New York Islanders in the 2015 NHL entry draft. On September 10, 2015, he signed a three-year, entry-level contract with the Islanders.

On October 15, 2016, Barzal made his NHL debut. He returned to the Thunderbirds and won the 2017 WHL championship as Barzal was named WHL Playoff MVP after registering 25 points (7 goals and 18 assists) in 16 games.

Barzal's first NHL point came on October 15, 2017, against the Los Angeles Kings when he assisted on a goal by Josh Bailey. Barzal's first NHL goal came on October 19, against Henrik Lundqvist of the New York Rangers. His first multi-point NHL game came on October 26, when he had a goal and an assist playing against the Minnesota Wild. The goal, the second of his career, came in the waning seconds of the Islanders' 6–4 loss. Barzal's first NHL power play goal (and also his first NHL goal at home) came on October 30, against the Vegas Golden Knights. Barzal set a franchise record for assists by a rookie when he recorded five assists on November 5, in a 6–4 win over the Colorado Avalanche. This also tied the franchise record for points in a game by a rookie. Barzal's first multi-goal game and his first hat-trick came on December 23, against the Winnipeg Jets in a 5–2 win. On January 13, 2018, in a 7–2 win over the Rangers, he became just the fifth player in NHL history to have two five-point games in a season before his 21st birthday. On February 9, in a 7–6 victory over the Detroit Red Wings, Barzal became the first NHL rookie to record three five-point games in a season since Joe Malone did so in the 1917–18 season. On April 7, Barzal tied the Islanders record (held by Bryan Trottier) for most assists by a rookie with 63. On April 22, Barzal was named a finalist for the Calder Memorial Trophy, which is awarded to the best rookie in the NHL. On June 20, he won the award. Barzal and Kyle Okposo are the only players to lead the Islanders in scoring during John Tavares' nine-year tenure with the team; however, Okposo did it in a season in which Tavares was hurt, whereas Barzal did it in a season in which they both played the full 82 games.

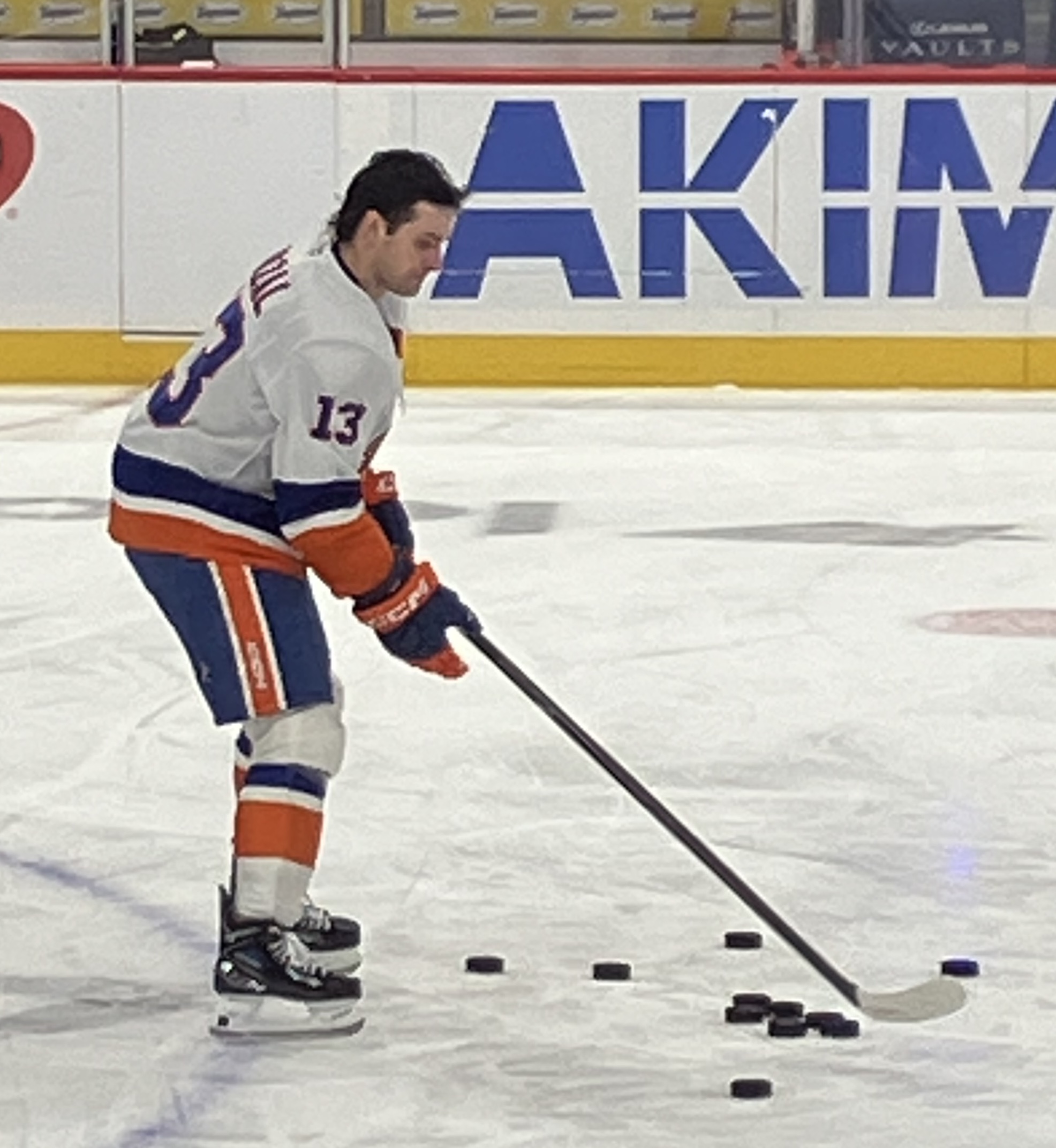
Barzal with the Islanders in 2026

Following the departure of Tavares during the 2018 off-season, Barzal began the 2018–19 season centering the Islanders' top line with Anthony Beauvillier and Josh Bailey. On December 29, Barzal scored a natural hat-trick in a 4–0 win over the Toronto Maple Leafs, becoming the first Islanders player to score a hat-trick against the Maple Leafs since Mike Bossy on March 20, 1986. On January 3, 2019, Barzal was named to the 2019 NHL All-Star Game. Barzal finished the season with 62 points (18 goals and 44 assists), leading the Islanders in both points and assists.

Barzal won the fastest skater competition at the 2020 NHL All-Star Skills Competition.

In the 2020 Stanley Cup playoffs, Barzal scored his first playoff overtime winner against the Washington Capitals in game 3 to give the Islanders a 3–0 series lead. The Islanders ended up winning the series 4–1 to face the Philadelphia Flyers in the second round, whom the Islanders beat in seven games. The Islanders lost to eventual Stanley Cup champion Tampa Bay Lightning in six games in the Eastern Conference Finals.

On January 11, 2021, Barzal was signed to a reported three-year, $21 million contract with the Islanders.

On October 4, 2022, Barzal signed an eight-year, $73.2 million contract extension with the Islanders. On January 1, 2023, in his 400th NHL regular season game, Barzal scored his 100th career goal in a 4–1 loss to the Seattle Kraken. In 2024, in was named to the 2024 NHL All-Star Game, his third All-Star selection. Barzal was limited to 30 games in the 2024–25 season, recording six goals and 14 assists while averaging 20:21 of ice time. He sustained an upper-body injury on October 30, 2024, on a hit from Yegor Chinakhov of the Columbus Blue Jackets and missed close to two months. He last appeared on February 1, 2025, before undergoing surgery on his kneecap, missing 52 games in total. He returned for the 2025–26 season opener against the Pittsburgh Penguins.

== International play ==
Medal record

Men's ice hockey

Representing Canada

World Championships
Silver medal – second place	2022 Finland	

Ivan Hlinka Memorial Tournament
Gold medal – first place	2014 Czech Republic	

IIHF World U18 Championship
Bronze medal – third place	2014 Finland	
Bronze medal – third place	2015 Switzerland	

IIHF World U20 Championship
Silver medal – second place	2017 Canada	

Barzal helped Canada capture the bronze medal at the 2014 World U18 Championships and won gold at the 2014 Ivan Hlinka Memorial Tournament. Barzal was again named to the Canada roster the following year to compete at the 2015 World U18 Championships, where he again won bronze.

Barzal was selected as an alternate captain for Canada at the 2017 World Junior Championships. He helped guide Canada to a silver medal and was one of the top ten scorers in the tournament.

On April 12, 2018, Barzal was named to Canada's senior team to compete at the 2018 World Championship.

== Personal life ==
Barzal speaks French, having undergone French immersion in school; as a result, he has a very close friendship with former Islanders teammate Anthony Beauvillier, a French-speaker whom he met when the two played for Canada at the 2015 World U18 Championships.

== Career statistics ==
=== Regular season and playoffs ===
			Regular season					Playoffs
Season	Team	League	GP	G	A	Pts	PIM	GP	G	A	Pts	PIM
2012–13	Coquitlam Express	BCHL	6	0	2	2	6	—	—	—	—	—
2013–14	Seattle Thunderbirds	WHL	59	14	40	54	20	9	1	5	6	4
2014–15	Seattle Thunderbirds	WHL	44	12	45	57	20	6	4	4	8	4
2015–16	Seattle Thunderbirds	WHL	58	27	61	88	58	18	5	21	26	16
2016–17	Seattle Thunderbirds	WHL	41	10	69	79	20	16	7	18	25	16
2016–17	New York Islanders	NHL	2	0	0	0	6	—	—	—	—	—
2017–18	New York Islanders	NHL	82	22	63	85	30	—	—	—	—	—
2018–19	New York Islanders	NHL	82	18	44	62	46	8	2	5	7	8
2019–20	New York Islanders	NHL	68	19	41	60	44	22	5	12	17	10
2020–21	New York Islanders	NHL	55	17	28	45	48	19	6	8	14	19
2021–22	New York Islanders	NHL	73	15	44	59	18	—	—	—	—	—
2022–23	New York Islanders	NHL	58	14	37	51	22	6	2	0	2	2
2023–24	New York Islanders	NHL	80	23	57	80	34	5	2	3	5	4
2024–25	New York Islanders	NHL	30	6	14	20	4	—	—	—	—	—
2025–26	New York Islanders	NHL	81	19	53	72	61	—	—	—	—	—
NHL totals			611	153	381	534	313	60	17	28	45	43

=== International ===
Year	Team	Event	Result	GP	G	A	Pts	PIM
2014	Canada	IH18	1st place, gold medalist(s)	5	2	5	7	0
2014	Canada	U18	3rd place, bronze medalist(s)	7	3	1	4	6
2015	Canada	U18	3rd place, bronze medalist(s)	7	3	9	12	0
2016	Canada	WJC	6th	5	2	1	3	0
2017	Canada	WJC	2nd place, silver medalist(s)	7	3	5	8	4
2018	Canada	WC	4th	10	0	7	7	4
2022	Canada	WC	2nd place, silver medalist(s)	9	2	6	8	4
Junior totals				31	13	21	33	10
Senior totals				19	2	13	15	8

== Awards and honours ==
Award	Year	Ref
Minor
Brick Super Novice Tournament Top Scorer	2007	
BC Hockey Player of the Year	2013	
BCMML Most Points	2013	
BCMML All-Star Team	2013	
WHL West First All-Star Team	2016, 2017	
WHL Playoff MVP	2017	
NHL
Rookie of the Month	January 2018	
Calder Memorial Trophy	2018	
NHL All-Star Game	2019, 2020, 2024	

Awards and achievements
Preceded by Josh Ho-Sang	New York Islanders first round pick 2015	Succeeded by Anthony Beauvillier
Preceded by Auston Matthews	Winner of the Calder Trophy; 2018	Succeeded by Elias Pettersson
