= Thomas Harley (ice hockey) =

Canadian ice hockey player (born 2001)

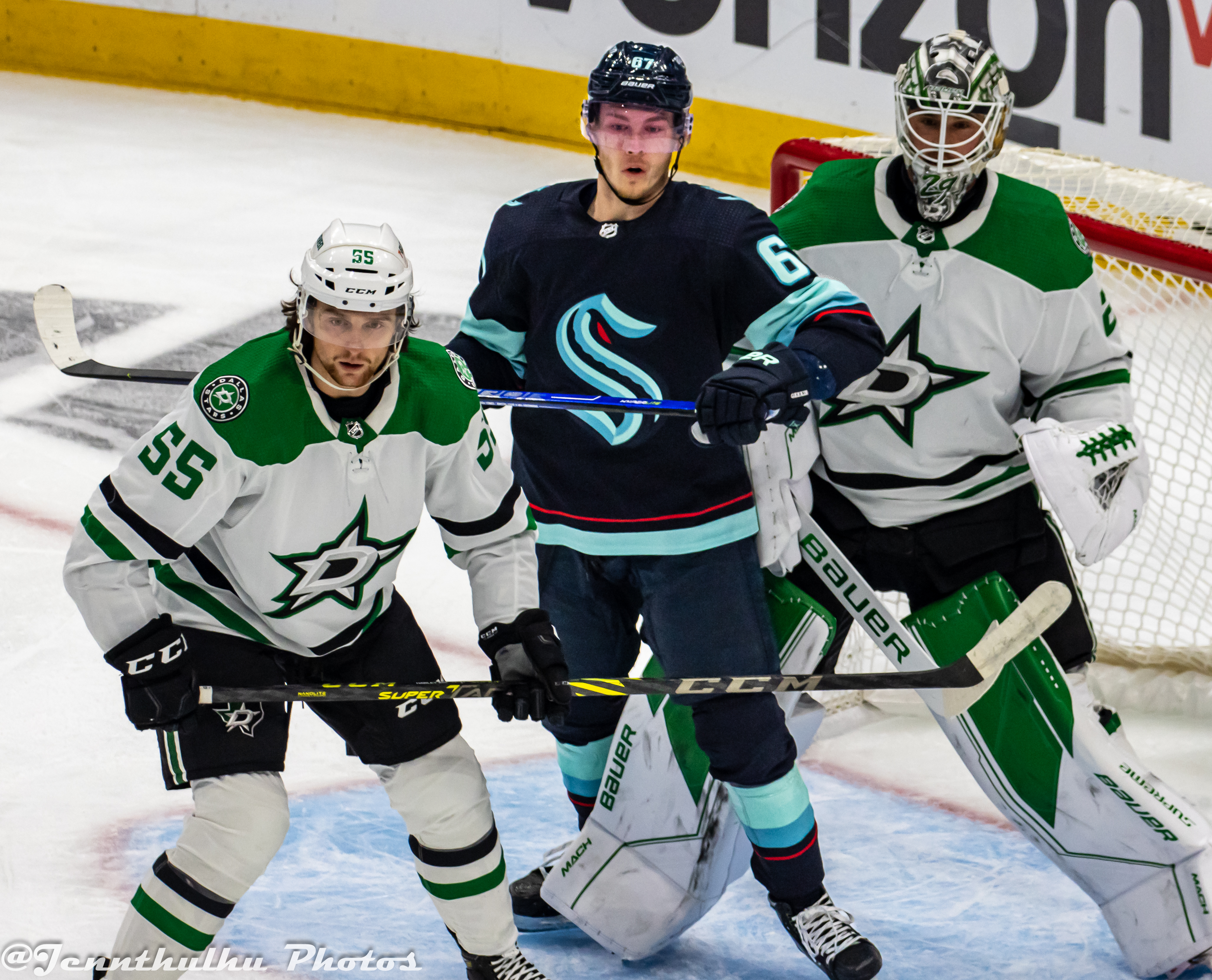
- Harley with the Dallas Stars in 2023
- Born: August 19, 2001 (age 25) Syracuse, New York, U.S.
- Height: 6 ft 3 in (191 cm)
- Weight: 214 lb (97 kg; 15 st 4 lb)
- Position: Defence
- Shoots: Left
- NHL team: Dallas Stars
- National team: Canada
- NHL draft: 18th overall, 2019; Dallas Stars
- Playing career: 2020–present

Thomas Harley (born August 19, 2001) is an American-born Canadian professional ice hockey player who is a defenceman for the Dallas Stars of the National Hockey League (NHL). He was drafted 18th overall by the Stars in the first round of the 2019 NHL entry draft.

== Early life ==
Harley was born on August 19, 2001, in Syracuse, New York, to Edmonton-born parents Brian and Stephanie. He was born into an athletic family as his father and three siblings all play ice hockey. His father played for the University of Alberta while his older brother Stuart played for the Milwaukee School of Engineering. His youngest brother Greg played Junior "A" ice hockey for the Hearst Lumberjacks before attending Iowa State University, where he plays now. Harley's older sister Emilie played college hockey for Robert Morris University before being drafted into the Premier Hockey Federation. While Harley played much of his youth hockey in Syracuse, he is a dual citizen of the United States and Canada.

== Playing career ==
=== Junior ===
Growing up in Syracuse, Harley and his brother Stuart were often coached by their father on their respective teams. Although Harley originally played forward, his father converted him to defenceman to fill a gap in the lineup.

==== Mississauga Steelheads ====
Harley was selected by the Mississauga Steelheads of the Ontario Hockey League in the first round, 14th overall, during the 2017 OHL Priority Draft. In the 2017–18 season, Harley played his first game with the Steelheads on September 22, 2017, earning no points in a 4–3 loss to the Ottawa 67's. Harley earned his first career point, an assist on a goal by Albert Michnac, in a 4–3 loss to the Saginaw Spirit on October 15. Harley scored his first career OHL goal on December 8 against Kai Edmonds of the Barrie Colts in a 3–2 loss. Harley recorded his first OHL career multi-point game on February 23, earning two assists in a 4–0 win over the Niagara IceDogs. In early March, Harley had a three-game point streak, earning four assists in those games. Overall, in 62 games during his rookie season, Harley scored one goal and 15 points. Harley made his postseason debut on March 22, earning no points in a 6–2 win over the Barrie Colts. One week later, on March 29, Harley recorded his first career playoff point, assisting on a goal scored by Cole Carter in a 5–4 loss to the Colts. In six playoff games, Harley earned two assists.

Harley saw much improvement in his second season with the Steelheads in 2018–19 season. On September 23, Harley recorded his first career three point game, earning three assists in an 8–6 loss to the Niagara IceDogs. Harley would record five more three point games during the season with the Steelheads. On December 31, Harley recorded his first multi-goal game of his OHL career, as he scored two goals against the Windsor Spitfires in a 9–5 victory. In 68 games, Harley scored 11 goals and 58 points. On March 22, Harley recorded his first career multi-point playoff game, earning two assists in a 5–2 loss to the Sudbury Wolves. In four postseason games, Harley earned four assists. At the end of the season, Harley was named the winner of the Bobby Smith Trophy as the OHL Scholastic Player of the Year. Harley was also named to the OHL Third All-Star Team.

Harley returned to the Steelheads for the 2019–20 season. He opened the season with points in each of his first 10 games, as he scored seven goals and added 10 assists during this streak, earning 17 points. On December 20, Harley scored two goals and two assists, earning his first career four point game, in an 8–2 win over the Barrie Colts. In 59 games, Harley scored a career-high 18 goals and added 39 assists for 57 points.

=== Professional ===
Leading up to the 2019 NHL entry draft, Harley was ranked 11th among all North American skaters eligible for the 2019 NHL entry draft. He was praised by The Athletic's Corey Pronman and Mitch Brown for his transitional play and creativity. Harley was eventually selected by the Dallas Stars in the first round, 18th overall, at the NHL entry draft. Following the draft, Harley attended the Steelheads training camp before playing in the Traverse City annual rookie tournament. While he struggled in his first game, Harley finished the tournament impressing Dallas scouts. Harley then attended the Stars' training camp, where he drew comparisons to Dallas defenceman Miro Heiskanen from head coach Jim Montgomery. During preseason games, Harley had opportunities to play alongside Heiskanen and veteran John Klingberg while averaging over 20 minutes of ice time. He also worked with then-assistant coach Rick Bowness on how to improve defending offensively, including stopping turnovers. On September 23, 2019, the Stars signed Harley to a three-year, entry-level contract. After being cut from the Stars roster ahead of the 2019–20 season, Harley immediately returned to the Steelheads for their season.

==== 2020 ====
When the NHL resumed play for the 2020 Stanley Cup playoffs, Harley was named to the Stars' taxi squad and stayed with them in the Edmonton bubble. Due to the pandemic, Harley took a three-day road trip from Syracuse to Edmonton in order to join the team. During the two months between his last Steelheads game and the taxi squad, Harley added 10 pounds of muscle due to working out consistently. He remained on the team's taxi squad until John Klingberg and Taylor Fedun were deemed unfit to play in the Stars' Western Conference seeding round-robin game against the Colorado Avalanche. Harley was placed in the lineup on August 5 alongside Esa Lindell and subsequently made his NHL debut that night. He finished his debut with 14 shifts through 10:58 of ice time as the Stars fell 4–0. Harley remained on the sidelines for the remainder of their games as Dallas met with the Calgary Flames in the first round. As the Stars qualified for the 2020 Stanley Cup Finals, Harley became the youngest player on either team's roster.

==== 2020–21 ====
When the NHL returned for the 2020–21 season, Harley was one of six players assigned to the Stars' taxi squad to start the season. However, he was reassigned to their American Hockey League (AHL) affiliate, the Texas Stars on January 29. Harley made an immediate impact with the team while playing on their top defensive pair with Joseph Cecconi while also killing penalties and playing on their first power play unit. He recorded his first professional goal in overtime on February 8 to help lift the Stars to a 3–2 win over the Iowa Wild. The goal also extended his point streak to three consecutive games to begin his AHL career. Through his first five days with the team, Harley accumulated two goals and three assists. Harley finished his rookie season leading all AHL defencemen with eight goals and ranked second in assists with 17. Although his 25 points helped him lead all league rookies, the Stars finished the 2020–21 season with a 17–18–3 record.

==== 2021–22 ====
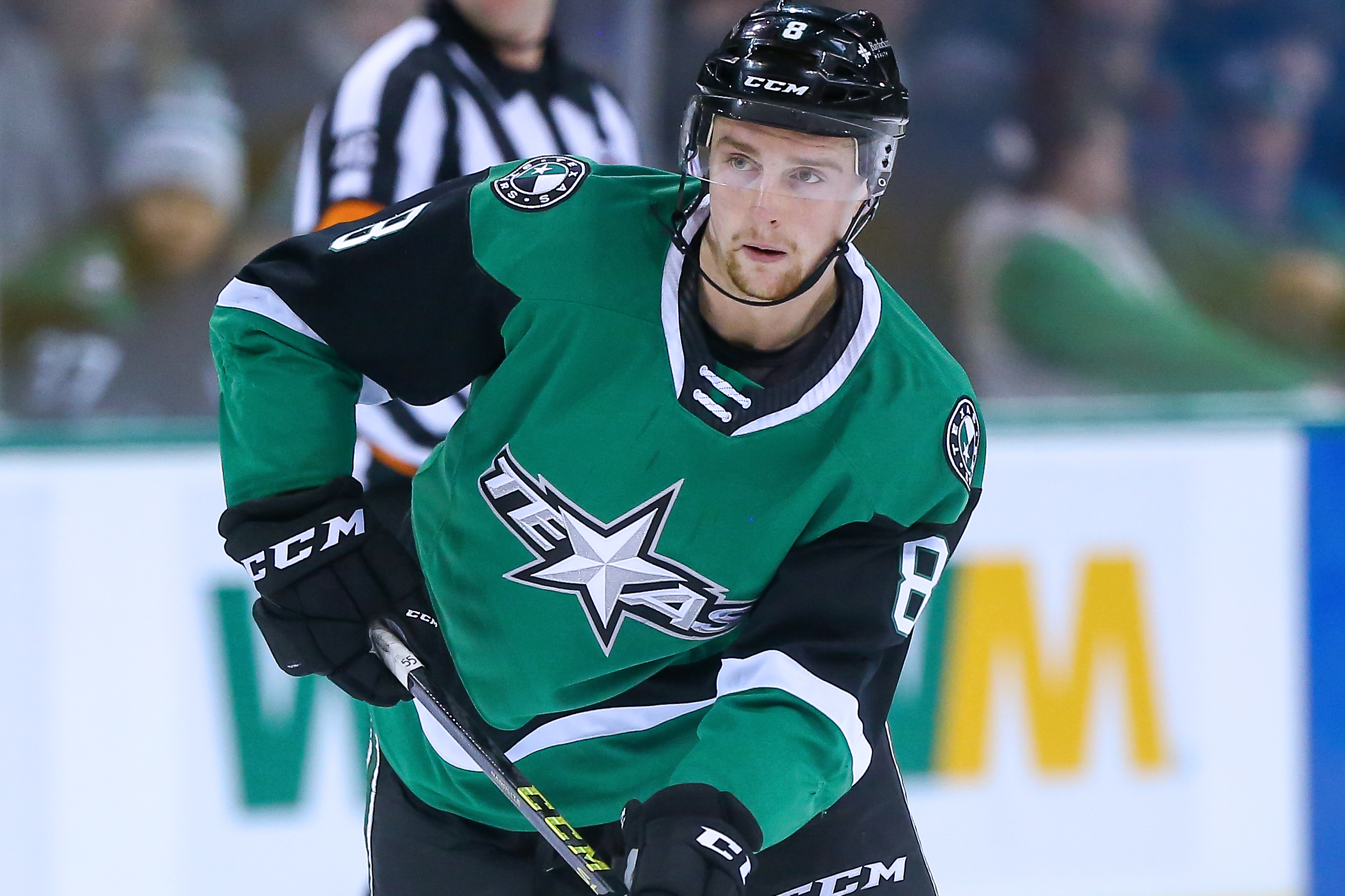
Harley playing for the Texas Stars in 2022.

Harley returned to the Dallas Stars training camp ahead of the 2021–22 NHL season but was again reassigned to the AHL before the final roster was announced. Despite struggling at the start of the season, Harley was recalled to the NHL level on November 1 after playing in six AHL games and recording one point. Although the team had a sufficient number of forwards and defencemen, head coach Rick Bowness stated that he brought Harley in to "bring an element which could help the Stars create more goals." Harley made his NHL regular season debut the following night against the Winnipeg Jets. He finished the game with 15:09 of ice time, one shot on goal, four shot attempts, two hits, and two blocked shots. He skated in three more NHL games, registering five shots on goal while skating an average of 14:11 per game, before being returned to the AHL on November 11. Harley skated in 11 more games for the Texas Stars, adding six more assists, before being recalled to the NHL level again on December 17. He skated in a few more games for Dallas before being reassigned to their taxi squad on January 15. Harley recorded his first career NHL point, an assist, on February 28 in a game against the Buffalo Sabres. He added his first career NHL goal later that season on April 28 against the Anaheim Ducks. Harley finished the regular season with one goal and three assists while averaging 13:41 in ice time through 34 games. He also played a total of 27 games in the AHL and recorded 11 assists.

==== 2022–23 ====
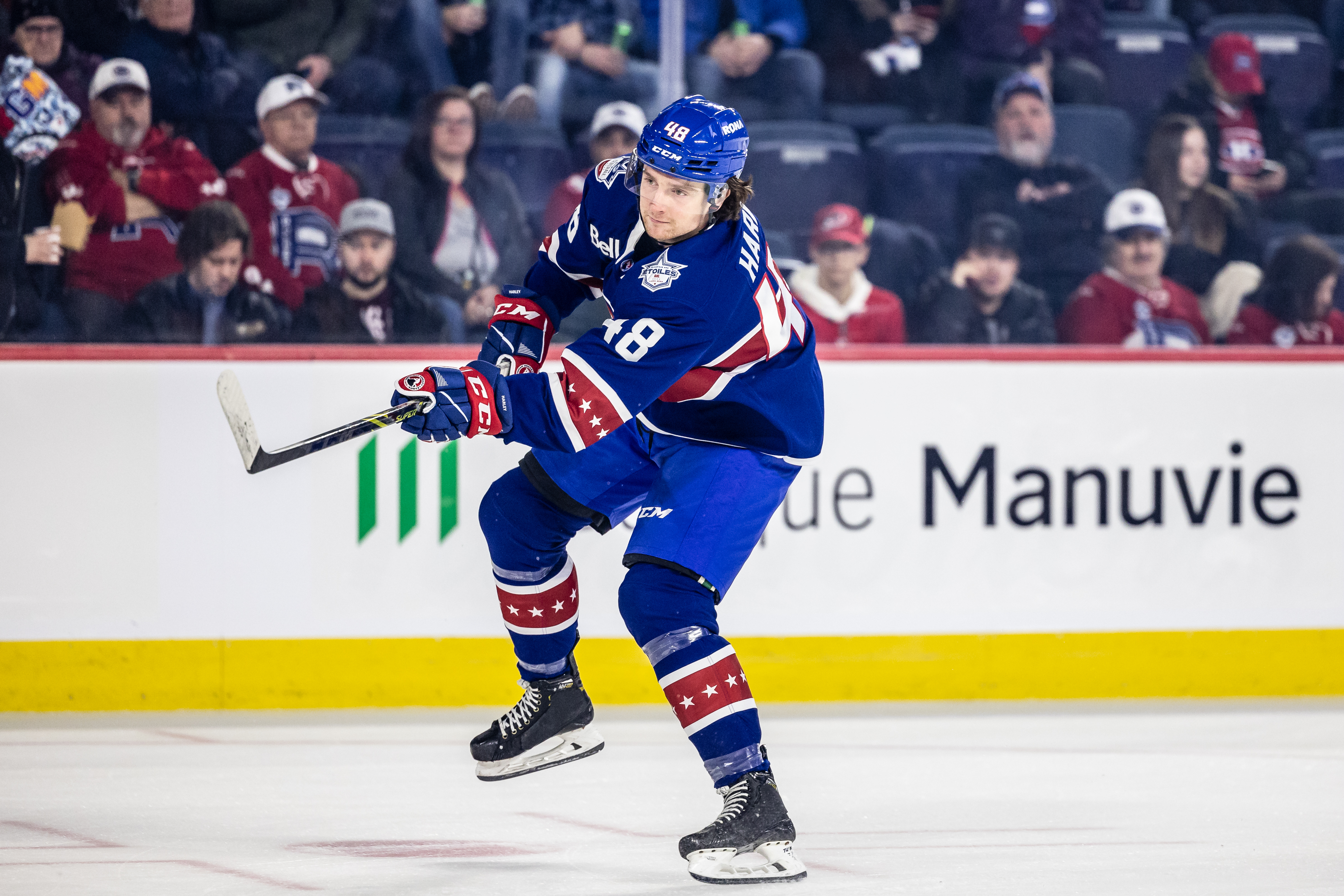
Harley at the 2023 AHL All-Star Classic Game.

Ahead of the 2022–23 season, Harley was expected to become an NHL regular and take some of John Klingberg's responsibilities as an offensive defenceman. However, following a trade for Nils Lundkvist and an unimpressive training camp, Harley spent the majority of the 2022–23 season in the AHL with the Texas Stars. After being cut from training camp, Harley was limited to six NHL games at the conclusion of the Stars' regular season. Upon joining the Stars in the AHL, Harley was removed from teams' power-play unit for their first six games in order for him to focus more on his defensive capabilities. This resulted in him playing on the team's second penalty kill unit and tallying five points in 11 games. With his assistance, the Star's penalty kill unit allowed just 18 goals in 144 chances from October to mid-January and scored seven shorthanded goals. Harley also accumulated eight goals and 22 points through 38 games during this time. Harley's efforts were recognized by the league with his first-ever selection for the 2023 AHL All-Star Game. Harley later stated that he appreciated his time in the AHL because it allowed him to work on his defensive skills. Harley finished with 10 goals and 24 assists as he missed the final six games of the season after being called up to the NHL. He remained with the Stars as they competed in the 2023 Stanley Cup playoffs, tallying one goal and added eight assists in 19 contests.

==== 2023–24 ====
During the 2023 off-season, Stars defenceman Colin Miller was traded, which opened a spot for Harley on the NHL roster. After participating in the Dallas Stars' development camp and preseason games, Harley was named to their opening night roster ahead of the 2023–24 season. Harley missed three games in late November following a facial injury during a game against the Minnesota Wild. He often played on the Stars' top defensive pairing alongside Miro Heiskanen, or Joel Hanley when Heiskanen was injured. Harley finished the regular season with 15 goals and 32 assists for 47 points through 79 games while averaging 21:01 of ice time per game.

==== 2024–25 ====
On September 17, 2024, Harley signed a two-year, $8 million extension with the Dallas Stars; the extension carries a cap hit of $4 million.

On May 17, 2025, Harley scored a power-play goal 1:33 into overtime as the Dallas Stars eliminated the Winnipeg Jets with a 2–1 win in game 6 of the second round of the 2025 Stanley Cup playoffs. Harley became the third-youngest defenceman in NHL history to score a series-clinching goal in overtime (23 years and 271 days), following Babe Pratt (21 years and 77 days) in game 2 of the 1937 first round, and Bobby Orr (22 years and 51 days) in game 4 of the 1970 Stanley Cup Finals. He also became just the second defenceman in Dallas Stars/Minnesota North Stars history to score a series-winning goal in overtime, following John Klingberg, who clinched game 6 of a 2019 first round series against the Nashville Predators.

== International play ==
Medal record

Representing Canada

Men's ice hockey

Olympic Games
Silver medal – second place	2026 Milano Cortina	

4 Nations Face-Off
Winner	2025 Canada/United States	

World Junior Championships
Silver medal – second place	2021 Canada	

Born in Syracuse, New York, to Edmonton-born parents, Harley holds dual citizenship. He has chosen to represent Canada at the international level. When speaking of the decision, Harley stated that while his family lived in New York, he was raised as a Canadian. Harley first played for Canada when he represented Team Canada Black at the 2017 World U-17 Hockey Challenge. He recorded no points over five games as the team placed seventh overall. The following year, he represented Canada at the 2019 World U18 Championships where they placed fourth. During the tournament, Harley tallied one goal and three assists for four points.

Despite representing Canada at the 2019 U18 Championships, Harley was one of the final cuts made to the Canadian roster ahead of the 2020 World Junior Championships. He returned to Canada's selection camp the following year and was named to the final roster to compete at the 2021 World Junior Championships.

After an injury to Shea Theodore in Canada senior team's first game at the 4 Nations Face-Off, and with Cale Makar facing a potential absence due to illness, Harley was named as emergency alternate for Canada, and when Makar was officially ruled out for Canada's second game, Harley formally joined the roster, playing for Canada against the United States senior team. Canada won the tournament and Harley finished with one assist in two games played.

On December 31, 2025, he was named to Canada's roster to compete at the 2026 Winter Olympics.

== Career statistics ==
=== Regular season and playoffs ===
			Regular season					Playoffs
Season	Team	League	GP	G	A	Pts	PIM	GP	G	A	Pts	PIM
2016–17	Vaughan Kings	GTMMHL	33	5	19	24	12	—	—	—	—	—
2017–18	Mississauga Steelheads	OHL	62	1	14	15	14	6	0	2	2	0
2018–19	Mississauga Steelheads	OHL	68	11	48	59	24	4	0	4	4	4
2019–20	Mississauga Steelheads	OHL	59	18	39	57	33	—	—	—	—	—
2019–20	Dallas Stars	NHL	—	—	—	—	—	1	0	0	0	0
2020–21	Texas Stars	AHL	38	8	17	25	31	—	—	—	—	—
2021–22	Texas Stars	AHL	27	0	11	11	36	—	—	—	—	—
2021–22	Dallas Stars	NHL	34	1	3	4	6	—	—	—	—	—
2022–23	Texas Stars	AHL	66	10	24	34	24	—	—	—	—	—
2022–23	Dallas Stars	NHL	6	0	2	2	2	19	1	8	9	14
2023–24	Dallas Stars	NHL	79	15	32	47	18	19	0	4	4	0
2024–25	Dallas Stars	NHL	78	16	34	50	16	18	4	10	14	10
2025–26	Dallas Stars	NHL	70	6	30	36	26	6	0	0	0	2
NHL totals			267	38	101	139	68	63	5	22	27	26

=== International ===
Year	Team	Event	Result	GP	G	A	Pts	PIM
2017	Canada Black	U17	7th	5	0	0	0	0
2019	Canada	U18	4th	7	1	3	4	8
2021	Canada	WJC	2nd place, silver medalist(s)	7	1	0	1	0
2025	Canada	4NF	1st place, gold medalist(s)	2	0	1	1	0
2026	Canada	OG	2nd place, silver medalist(s)	6	1	3	4	0
Junior totals				19	2	3	5	8
Senior totals				8	1	4	5	0

== Awards and honours ==
Award	Year	Ref
OHL
Bobby Smith Trophy	2019	
OHL Third All-Star Team	2019	
OHL Second All-Star Team	2020	

Awards and achievements
Preceded by Ty Dellandrea	Dallas Stars first-round draft pick 2019	Succeeded by Mavrik Bourque
