= 4 Nations Face-Off =

International men's ice hockey tournament

Tournament details
- Host countries: Canada; United States
- Venues: Montreal: Bell Centre; Boston: TD Garden
- Dates: February 12–20, 2025
- Teams: 4

Final positions
- Champions: Canada

Tournament statistics
- Games played: 7
- Goals scored: 41 (5.86 per game)
- Attendance: 135,977 (19,425 per game)
- Scoring leader: (United States) Zach Werenski (6 points)

Awards
- MVP: (Canada) Nathan MacKinnon

The 4 Nations Face-Off (French: Confrontation des 4 nations) was an international ice hockey tournament held from February 12 to 20, 2025. The games were played in Montreal at the Bell Centre and in Boston at TD Garden. Hosted by the National Hockey League (NHL) and featuring only NHL players, the 4 Nations Face-Off temporarily replaced the NHL's annual All-Star Game for 2025. In the tournament, teams representing Canada, Finland, Sweden, and the United States played each other in a round-robin format, followed by a one-game final between the two top-placed teams. Although each team's respective national ice hockey governing body selected the rosters, the tournament was an NHL-only event, not affiliated with the International Ice Hockey Federation.

Canada won the tournament after defeating the United States 3–2 in overtime of the final. Reactions to the tournament from sports journalists were positive and the tournament was viewed as a welcome change from the All-Star Game format.

== Background ==
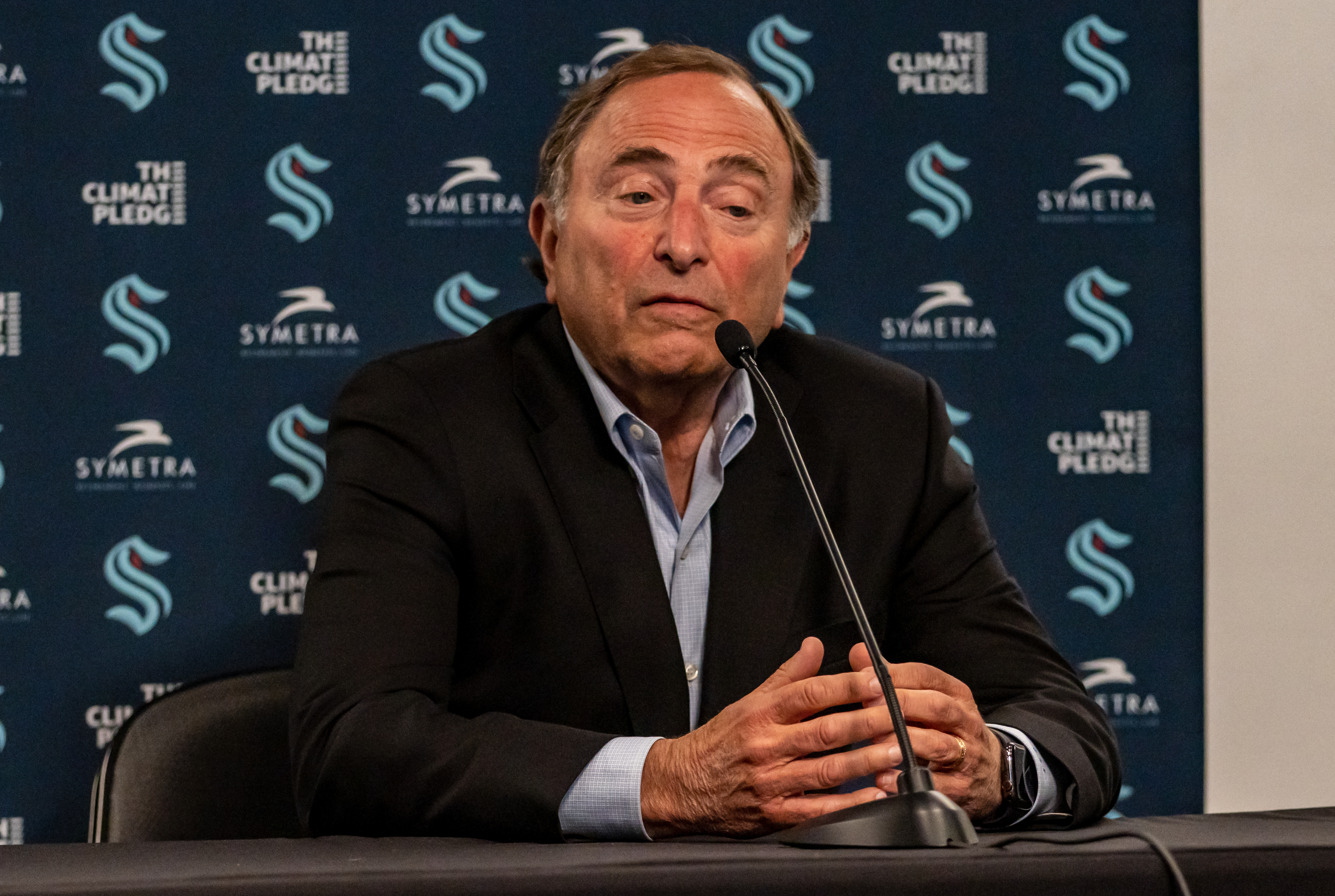
Gary Bettman announced the 4 Nations Face-Off in February 2024.

The 4 Nations Face-Off was announced at a press conference at the 2024 NHL All-Star Game on February 2, 2024, by NHL commissioner Gary Bettman. Also present at the press conference were NHL Players' Association (NHLPA) executive director Marty Walsh and four NHL players: Connor McDavid (Canada), Sebastian Aho (Finland), Elias Pettersson (Sweden), and Auston Matthews (United States).

At the press conference, Bettman announced plans for NHL participation in international best-on-best tournaments in coming years. In 2025, players would participate in the 4 Nations Face-Off, a tournament between NHL players representing Canada, Finland, Sweden, and the United States, which would be held in lieu of the 2025 NHL All-Star Game. Bettman stated that NHL players would play in the 2026 and 2030 Winter Olympics, after they had not been released for the 2018 and 2022 tournaments. Bettman also stated the league would host the next World Cups of Hockey in 2028 and 2032; the most recent edition was held in 2016.

Men's top 10 IIHF rankings as of May 2023
Rank	Change*	Team	Points
1	▲1	Canada	4150
2	▼1	Finland	4080
3	Steady	Russia	4050
4	Steady	United States	3940
5	▲4	Germany	3835
6	▼1	Sweden	3800
7	Steady	Switzerland	3775
8	▼2	Czechia	3735
9	▼1	Slovakia	3690
10	▲1	Latvia	3610

At the time of the tournament's announcement, all participating teams were ranked in the top six by ice hockey's worldwide governing body, the International Ice Hockey Federation (IIHF): Canada (1), Finland (2), United States (4), and Sweden (6). Germany, while ranked fifth, did not have enough NHL players to create a roster. Though they had enough NHL players to create a roster, Russia and Czechia—ranked third and eighth, respectively—were not included in the tournament, with Russia specifically excluded due to the ban imposed on it by the IIHF for the ongoing war in Ukraine. Czech forward David Pastrňák called the omission of Czechia a "huge disappointment", though he said he understood there was limited time to organize the tournament. In early reporting on the tournament's format, journalist Greg Wyshynski wrote that the competition could not be considered best-on-best due to the omission of players from other ice hockey powers.

The tournament took place among heightened political tensions between Canada and the United States due to American president Donald Trump's call for annexing Canada and plan to impose tariffs on the country. Before the final, Trump posted on Truth Social stating he would be calling the United States team and that "[Canada] will someday, maybe soon, become our cherished, and very important, Fifty First State". After Canada beat the United States in the final, Canadian Prime Minister Justin Trudeau tweeted "You can't take our country – and you can't take our game". Before Canada's round-robin game against the United States in Montreal, fans booed the American anthem, which was responded to with fans booing the Canadian anthem in the final in Boston. Anthem singer Chantal Kreviazuk changed one of the lines of the Canadian anthem to sing "that only us command" instead of "in all of us command" in response to Trump's annexation rhetoric. Following the game, tournament MVP Nathan MacKinnon stated "A lot of stuff going on with Canada and the USA right now, and us playing against each other was kind of a perfect storm for our sport. It was much more popular than even we would have imagined. It was getting so much attention from our whole continent." Canada's coach Jon Cooper stated "I just hope Canada’s proud, because every player in that room is proud to be a Canadian, and yeah, did we need a win, not only like our team, but Canada needed a win. The players beared that on their shoulders and they took it seriously. This one was different, this wasn't a win for themselves, this was a win for 40+ million people and the guys knew it and they delivered." The political tension in the tournament between the United States and Canada was compared to the 1972 Summit Series between Canada and the Soviet Union.

== Venues ==
The league did not initially announce the tournament venues, but stated that there would be two: one in Canada and one in the United States. The league confirmed on June 8, 2024, that the venues would be Bell Centre in Montreal and TD Garden in Boston, after months of reports by various media sources.

(Canada) Montreal	(United States) Boston
Bell Centre	TD Garden
Capacity: 21,105	Capacity: 17,850

== Format ==
Two practice days, February 10 and 11, were held prior to the tournament. From February 12–20, seven total games were played. The tournament was held in a round-robin format. Each team played three games, and the two teams with the most points advanced to a one-game final.

Games were played on NHL-sized rinks, following NHL rules. For round-robin games, overtime was a 10-minute, 3-on-3 sudden-death period, followed by a three-round shootout. In the final, overtime was held in consecutive 20-minute, 5-on-5 sudden-death periods.

Tiebreakers

Teams were ranked according to points earned (3 points for a regulation win, 2 points for an overtime or shootout win, 1 point for an overtime or shootout loss, 0 points for a regulation loss). If tied on points, tiebreakers would be applied in the following order:

1. Head-to-head result (only if tie between two teams);
2. Total regulation wins;
3. Total regulation and overtime wins;
4. Total goal difference;
5. Total goals scored;
6. Goal difference in games played between tied teams;
7. Goals scored in games played between tied teams;
8. Most even-strength goals for in games played between tied teams;
9. Fewest even strength goals against in games played between tied teams.

== Teams ==
Teams consisted of 23 players: 20 skaters (forwards and defencemen) and 3 goaltenders. Players were selected by their respective governing bodies: Hockey Canada, the Finnish Ice Hockey Association, the Swedish Ice Hockey Association and USA Hockey. The tournament was restricted to players who have a 2024–25 NHL contract and were on an NHL roster as of December 2, 2024. Because the NHL did not have an agreement directly with the IIHF for the 4 Nations Face-Off (only an agreement with the governing bodies which are IIHF members), the tournament could not include non-NHL players.

On June 28, 2024, the NHL announced the first six players on each team's roster. The remaining players were announced on December 4, with the complete rosters of Team Sweden and Team Finland announced at 2:00 p.m. ET on the NHL Network and ESPN's SportsCenter, and the complete rosters of Team USA and Team Canada announced at 6:30 p.m. during pregame broadcasts on Sportsnet, TNT, and TVA Sports. Initially, no players from the Seattle Kraken or Washington Capitals were selected to participate in the 4 Nations Face-Off; however, the Kraken gained a representative when they acquired Finland's Kaapo Kakko from the New York Rangers on December 18, 2024. About a week before the tournament, the San Jose Sharks lost their representation in the event by trading Finland's Mikael Granlund to the Dallas Stars, making the Capitals and the Sharks the only two teams to not appear in the event.

=== Canada ===
In April 2024, it was announced that Don Sweeney and Jim Nill were appointed by Doug Armstrong as Canada's general manager and associate general manager, respectively. Both were also named assistant general managers for the 2026 Olympic team. On June 25, Jon Cooper was named Canada's head coach for both the 4 Nations Face-Off and 2026 Winter Olympics. Rick Tocchet, Bruce Cassidy, and Peter DeBoer joined Cooper as assistant coaches for the 4 Nations Face-Off. On December 4, 2024, the entire roster for Canada was released. On January 26, 2025, defenseman Alex Pietrangelo withdrew from the tournament; Drew Doughty was announced as his replacement on February 9. On January 30, 2025, Team Canada named Sidney Crosby as its team captain for the 4 Nations Face-Off, with Cale Makar and Connor McDavid serving as alternate captains. After an injury to Shea Theodore in Canada's first game, and Makar facing a potential absence due to illness, Thomas Harley was named as emergency alternate for Canada; after Makar was officially ruled out for Canada's second game, Harley formally joined the roster, playing for Canada against the United States. Brad Marchand served as alternate captain in the absence of Makar.

Head coach: Jon Cooper

No.	Pos.	Name	S/G	Birthplace	Birthdate	Team
5	D	Devon Toews	L	Abbotsford, British Columbia	April 21, 1994 (aged 30)	Colorado Avalanche
6	D	Travis Sanheim	L	Elkhorn, Manitoba	March 29, 1996 (aged 28)	Philadelphia Flyers
8	D	Cale Makar (A)	R	Calgary, Alberta	October 30, 1998 (aged 26)	Colorado Avalanche
9	F	Sam Bennett	L	Holland Landing, Ontario	June 20, 1996 (aged 28)	Florida Panthers
11	F	Travis Konecny	R	London, Ontario	March 11, 1997 (aged 27)	Philadelphia Flyers
13	F	Sam Reinhart	R	North Vancouver, British Columbia	November 6, 1995 (aged 29)	Florida Panthers
16	F	Mitch Marner	R	Markham, Ontario	May 5, 1997 (aged 27)	Toronto Maple Leafs
21	F	Brayden Point	R	Calgary, Alberta	March 13, 1996 (aged 28)	Tampa Bay Lightning
24	F	Seth Jarvis	R	Winnipeg, Manitoba	February 1, 2002 (aged 23)	Carolina Hurricanes
27	D	Shea Theodore	L	Aldergrove, British Columbia	August 3, 1995 (aged 29)	Vegas Golden Knights
29	F	Nathan MacKinnon	R	Halifax, Nova Scotia	September 1, 1995 (aged 29)	Colorado Avalanche
33	G	Adin Hill	L	Comox, British Columbia	May 11, 1996 (aged 28)	Vegas Golden Knights
35	G	Sam Montembeault	L	Bécancour, Quebec	October 30, 1996 (aged 28)	Montreal Canadiens
38	F	Brandon Hagel	L	Saskatoon, Saskatchewan	August 27, 1998 (aged 26)	Tampa Bay Lightning
44	D	Josh Morrissey	L	Calgary, Alberta	March 28, 1995 (aged 29)	Winnipeg Jets
48	D	Thomas Harley	L	Syracuse, New York (Note: Harley was born in the United States to Canadian parents.)	August 19, 2001 (aged 23)	Dallas Stars
50	G	Jordan Binnington	L	Richmond Hill, Ontario	July 11, 1993 (aged 31)	St. Louis Blues
55	D	Colton Parayko	R	St. Albert, Alberta	May 12, 1993 (aged 31)	St. Louis Blues
61	F	Mark Stone	R	Winnipeg, Manitoba	May 13, 1992 (aged 32)	Vegas Golden Knights
63	F	Brad Marchand (A)	L	Hammonds Plains, Nova Scotia	May 11, 1988 (aged 36)	Boston Bruins
71	F	Anthony Cirelli	L	Woodbridge, Ontario	July 15, 1997 (aged 27)	Tampa Bay Lightning
87	F	Sidney Crosby (C)	L	Halifax, Nova Scotia	August 7, 1987 (aged 37)	Pittsburgh Penguins
89	D	Drew Doughty	R	London, Ontario	December 8, 1989 (aged 35)	Los Angeles Kings
97	F	Connor McDavid (A)	L	Richmond Hill, Ontario	January 13, 1997 (aged 28)	Edmonton Oilers

=== Finland ===
Jere Lehtinen was the general manager, and his assistants were Mikko Koivu and Jarmo Kekäläinen. Antti Pennanen was the head coach, and Tuomo Ruutu was the assistant coach. On December 4, 2024, the entire roster for Finland was released. On January 30, 2025, Aleksander Barkov was named captain for Team Finland; Sebastian Aho, Mikael Granlund, and Mikko Rantanen were named alternate captains. On the same day, defenceman Miro Heiskanen was ruled out of the tournament due to injury. On February 2, he and defenceman Jani Hakanpaa, who was also injured, were replaced by Urho Vaakanainen and Henri Jokiharju. On February 9, defenceman Rasmus Ristolainen was ruled out due to injury, and was replaced by Nikolas Matinpalo.

Head coach: Antti Pennanen

No.	Pos.	Name	S/G	Birthplace	Birthdate	Team
1	G	Ukko-Pekka Luukkonen	L	Espoo, Uusimaa	March 9, 1999 (aged 25)	Buffalo Sabres
3	D	Olli Määttä	L	Jyväskylä, Central Finland	August 22, 1994 (aged 30)	Utah Hockey Club
6	D	Juuso Välimäki	L	Nokia, Pirkanmaa	October 6, 1998 (aged 26)	Utah Hockey Club
10	D	Henri Jokiharju	R	Oulu, North Ostrobothnia	June 17, 1999 (aged 25)	Buffalo Sabres
15	F	Anton Lundell	L	Espoo, Uusimaa	October 3, 2001 (aged 23)	Florida Panthers
16	F	Aleksander Barkov (C)	L	Tampere, Pirkanmaa	September 2, 1995 (aged 29)	Florida Panthers
18	D	Urho Vaakanainen	L	Joensuu, North Karelia	January 1, 1999 (aged 26)	New York Rangers
20	F	Sebastian Aho (A)	L	Rauma, Satakunta	July 26, 1997 (aged 27)	Carolina Hurricanes
23	D	Esa Lindell	L	Helsinki, Uusimaa	May 23, 1994 (aged 30)	Dallas Stars
24	F	Roope Hintz	L	Nokia, Pirkanmaa	November 17, 1996 (aged 28)	Dallas Stars
27	F	Eetu Luostarinen	L	Siilinjärvi, North Savo	September 2, 1998 (aged 26)	Florida Panthers
32	G	Kevin Lankinen	L	Helsinki, Uusimaa	April 28, 1995 (aged 29)	Vancouver Canucks
33	D	Nikolas Matinpalo	R	Espoo, Uusimaa	October 5, 1998 (aged 26)	Ottawa Senators
40	F	Joel Armia	R	Pori, Satakunta	May 31, 1993 (aged 31)	Montreal Canadiens
56	F	Erik Haula	L	Pori, Satakunta	March 23, 1991 (aged 33)	New Jersey Devils
62	F	Artturi Lehkonen	L	Piikkiö, Southwest Finland	July 4, 1995 (aged 29)	Colorado Avalanche
64	F	Mikael Granlund (A)	L	Oulunsalo, North Ostrobothnia	February 26, 1992 (aged 32)	Dallas Stars
74	G	Juuse Saros	L	Forssa, Kanta-Häme	April 19, 1995 (aged 29)	Nashville Predators
77	D	Niko Mikkola	L	Kiiminki, North Ostrobothnia	April 27, 1996 (aged 28)	Florida Panthers
84	F	Kaapo Kakko	L	Turku, Southwest Finland	February 13, 2001 (aged 23)	Seattle Kraken
86	F	Teuvo Teräväinen	L	Helsinki, Uusimaa	April 11, 1994 (aged 30)	Chicago Blackhawks
92	F	Patrik Laine	R	Tampere, Pirkanmaa	April 19, 1998 (aged 26)	Montreal Canadiens
96	F	Mikko Rantanen (A)	L	Nousiainen, Southwest Finland	October 29, 1996 (aged 28)	Carolina Hurricanes

=== Sweden ===
The general manager for Sweden was Josef Boumedienne, along with assistant general manager was Patric Hörnqvist. Sam Hallam was the head coach, and Daniel Alfredsson served as an assistant coach. On December 4, 2024, the full roster for Sweden was released. On January 29, 2025, goaltender Jacob Markstrom withdrew from the tournament due to injury, and was replaced by Samuel Ersson. On February 3, forward William Karlsson also withdrew due to injury, being replaced by Rickard Rakell. On January 30, Victor Hedman was named team captain for Team Sweden; Mattias Ekholm, Erik Karlsson, and William Nylander were selected as alternate captains.

Head coach: Sam Hallam

No.	Pos.	Name	S/G	Birthplace	Birthdate	Team
4	D	Rasmus Andersson	R	Malmö, Skåne	October 27, 1996 (aged 28)	Calgary Flames
9	F	Filip Forsberg	R	Östervåla, Uppsala	August 13, 1994 (aged 30)	Nashville Predators
10	F	Adrian Kempe	L	Kramfors, Västernorrland	September 13, 1996 (aged 28)	Los Angeles Kings
12	F	Gustav Nyquist	L	Halmstad, Halland	September 1, 1989 (aged 35)	Nashville Predators
14	D	Mattias Ekholm (A)	L	Borlänge, Dalarna	May 24, 1990 (aged 34)	Edmonton Oilers
20	F	Joel Eriksson Ek	L	Karlstad, Värmland	January 29, 1997 (aged 28)	Minnesota Wild
23	F	Lucas Raymond	R	Gothenburg, Västra Götaland	March 28, 2002 (aged 22)	Detroit Red Wings
25	D	Jonas Brodin	L	Karlstad, Värmland	July 12, 1993 (aged 31)	Minnesota Wild
26	D	Rasmus Dahlin	L	Trollhättan, Västra Götaland	April 13, 2000 (aged 24)	Buffalo Sabres
28	F	Elias Lindholm	R	Boden, Norrbotten	December 2, 1994 (aged 30)	Boston Bruins
30	G	Samuel Ersson	L	Falun, Dalarna	October 20, 1999 (aged 25)	Philadelphia Flyers
32	G	Filip Gustavsson	L	Skellefteå, Västerbotten	June 7, 1998 (aged 26)	Minnesota Wild
33	F	Viktor Arvidsson	R	Kusmark, Västerbotten	April 8, 1993 (aged 31)	Edmonton Oilers
35	G	Linus Ullmark	L	Lugnvik, Västernorrland	July 31, 1993 (aged 31)	Ottawa Senators
40	F	Elias Pettersson	L	Sundsvall, Västernorrland	November 12, 1998 (aged 26)	Vancouver Canucks
42	D	Gustav Forsling	L	Linköping, Östergötland	June 12, 1996 (aged 28)	Florida Panthers
63	F	Jesper Bratt	L	Stockholm, Stockholm	July 30, 1998 (aged 26)	New Jersey Devils
65	D	Erik Karlsson (A)	R	Landsbro, Jönköping	May 31, 1990 (aged 34)	Pittsburgh Penguins
67	F	Rickard Rakell	R	Sollentuna, Stockholm	May 5, 1993 (aged 31)	Pittsburgh Penguins
77	D	Victor Hedman (C)	L	Örnsköldsvik, Västernorrland	December 18, 1990 (aged 34)	Tampa Bay Lightning
88	F	William Nylander (A)	R	Calgary, Alberta (Note: Nylander was born in Canada while his father, Michael, was playing for the Calgary Flames.)	May 1, 1996 (aged 28)	Toronto Maple Leafs
91	F	Leo Carlsson	L	Karlstad, Värmland	December 26, 2004 (aged 20)	Anaheim Ducks
93	F	Mika Zibanejad	R	Huddinge, Stockholm	April 18, 1993 (aged 31)	New York Rangers

=== United States ===
In February 2024, Bill Guerin was announced as general manager of the United States team for the 4 Nations Face-Off and 2026 Winter Olympics. In May, Mike Sullivan was named head coach of the team for both competitions. John Hynes, John Tortorella, and David Quinn are the assistant coaches. On December 4, 2024, the entire roster for the United States was released. On January 30, 2025, Auston Matthews was named captain for Team USA; Charlie McAvoy and Matthew Tkachuk were chosen as its alternate captains. On February 9, defenseman Quinn Hughes withdrew from the tournament due to a lower-body injury, and was replaced by Jake Sanderson. On February 18, Quinn Hughes attempted to rejoin the tournament while Charlie McAvoy withdrew from the championship game after suffering an upper-body injury during the game against Finland, but ultimately did not rejoin and Team USA added Tage Thompson and Brett Pesce as emergency backups. Jack Eichel, Brock Nelson, and Brady Tkachuk served as alternate captains in the absence of Matthews, McAvoy, and Matthew Tkachuk.

Head coach: Mike Sullivan

No.	Pos.	Name	S/G	Birthplace	Birthdate	Team
1	G	Jeremy Swayman	L	Anchorage, Alaska	November 24, 1998 (aged 26)	Boston Bruins
7	F	Brady Tkachuk (A)	L	Scottsdale, Arizona	September 16, 1999 (aged 25)	Ottawa Senators
8	D	Zach Werenski	L	Grosse Pointe, Michigan	July 19, 1997 (aged 27)	Columbus Blue Jackets
9	F	Jack Eichel (A)	R	North Chelmsford, Massachusetts	October 28, 1996 (aged 28)	Vegas Golden Knights
10	F	J.T. Miller	L	East Palestine, Ohio	March 14, 1993 (aged 31)	New York Rangers
12	F	Matt Boldy	L	Millville, Massachusetts	April 5, 2001 (aged 23)	Minnesota Wild
14	D	Brock Faber	R	Maple Grove, Minnesota	August 22, 2002 (aged 22)	Minnesota Wild
15	D	Noah Hanifin	L	Boston, Massachusetts	January 25, 1997 (aged 28)	Vegas Golden Knights
16	F	Vincent Trocheck	R	Pittsburgh, Pennsylvania	July 11, 1993 (aged 31)	New York Rangers
19	F	Matthew Tkachuk (A)	L	Scottsdale, Arizona	December 11, 1997 (aged 27)	Florida Panthers
20	F	Chris Kreider	L	Boxford, Massachusetts	April 30, 1991 (aged 33)	New York Rangers
21	F	Dylan Larkin	L	Waterford Township, Michigan	July 30, 1996 (aged 28)	Detroit Red Wings
23	D	Adam Fox	R	Jericho, New York	February 17, 1998 (aged 26)	New York Rangers
25	D	Charlie McAvoy (A)	R	Long Beach, New York	December 21, 1997 (aged 27)	Boston Bruins
29	F	Brock Nelson (A)	L	Minneapolis, Minnesota	October 15, 1991 (aged 33)	New York Islanders
30	G	Jake Oettinger	L	Lakeville, Minnesota	December 18, 1998 (aged 26)	Dallas Stars
34	F	Auston Matthews (C)	L	San Ramon, California	September 17, 1997 (aged 27)	Toronto Maple Leafs
37	G	Connor Hellebuyck	L	Commerce Township, Michigan	May 19, 1993 (aged 31)	Winnipeg Jets
59	F	Jake Guentzel	L	Omaha, Nebraska	October 6, 1994 (aged 30)	Tampa Bay Lightning
74	D	Jaccob Slavin	L	Erie, Colorado	May 1, 1994 (aged 30)	Carolina Hurricanes
81	F	Kyle Connor	L	Clinton Township, Michigan	December 9, 1996 (aged 28)	Winnipeg Jets
85	D	Jake Sanderson	L	Whitefish, Montana	July 8, 2002 (aged 22)	Ottawa Senators
86	F	Jack Hughes	L	Orlando, Florida	May 14, 2001 (aged 23)	New Jersey Devils

== Officials ==
The NHL selected four of its referees and four linesmen to officiate the tournament:

Referees

- (Canada) Gord Dwyer
- (Canada) Jean Hebert
- (Canada) Wes McCauley
- (United States) Chris Rooney

Linesmen

- (Canada) Scott Cherrey
- (United States) Ryan Daisy
- (Canada) Kiel Murchison
- (Canada) Jonny Murray

Standby referee Pierre Lambert officiated two periods after replacing Wes McCauley during the first intermission of the Sweden–United States game.

== Results ==
Note: All times listed are in EST (UTC−5).

=== Round-robin ===
Team	Pld	W	OTW	OTL	L	GF	GA	GD	Pts	Qualification
United States (H)	3	2	0	0	1	10	4	+6	6	Advance to Final
Canada (C, H)	3	1	1	0	1	10	9	+1	5 (Note: Head-to-head: Canada 4–3 (OT) Sweden)	Advance to Final
Sweden	3	1	0	2	0	8	9	−1	5	
Finland	3	0	1	0	2	8	14	−6	2	

Source: NHL
Rules for classification: Tiebreakers
(C) Champion; (H) Host
Notes:

February 12; 8 p.m.	Canada	4–3 OT (2–0, 1–1, 0–2) (OT: 1–0)	Sweden	Bell Centre, Montreal; Attendance: 21,105

Game reference

Jordan Binnington
Goalies
Filip Gustavsson
Referees:
(United States) Chris Rooney
(Canada) Gord Dwyer
Linesmen:
(Canada) Scott Cherrey
(United States) Ryan Daisy

MacKinnon (Crosby, McDavid) (PP) – 00:56	1–0
Marchand (Point, Jarvis) – 13:15	2–0
	2–1	29:33 – Brodin (Hedman, Raymond)
Stone (Crosby) – 37:28	3–1
	3–2	41:54 – Kempe (Karlsson, Ekholm)
	3–3	48:59 – Eriksson Ek (Bratt, Raymond)
Marner (Crosby) – 66:06	4–3

2 min
Penalties
2 min
28
Shots
26

February 13; 8 p.m.	United States	6–1 (1–1, 1–0, 4–0)	Finland	Bell Centre, Montreal; Attendance: 21,105

Game reference

Connor Hellebuyck
Goalies
Juuse Saros
Referees:
(Canada) Wes McCauley
(Canada) Jean Hebert
Linesmen:
(Canada) Jonny Murray
(Canada) Kiel Murchison

	0–1	07:31 – Jokiharju (Granlund, Määttä)
B. Tkachuk (Boldy, Werenski) – 10:21	1–1
Boldy (Faber, Connor) – 37:04	2–1
M. Tkachuk (Werenski, Guentzel) (PP) – 40:15	3–1
Guentzel (Matthews, Hughes) – 40:26	4–1
B. Tkachuk (Eichel, M. Tkachuk) – 43:00	5–1
M. Tkachuk (Werenski, Eichel) (PP) – 51:13	6–1

6 min
Penalties
10 min
32
Shots
21

February 15; 1 p.m.	Finland	4–3 OT (2–1, 1–2, 0–0) (OT: 1–0)	Sweden	Bell Centre, Montreal; Attendance: 19,724

Game reference

Kevin Lankinen
Goalies
Filip Gustavsson
Linus Ullmark
Referees:
(United States) Chris Rooney
(Canada) Wes McCauley
Linesmen:
(Canada) Jonny Murray
(Canada) Scott Cherrey

	0–1	08:35 – Zibanejad
Lundell (Luostarinen, Laine) – 10:58	1–1
Rantanen (Laine, Aho) (PP) – 19:46	2–1
	2–2	25:06 – Dahlin (Eriksson Ek, Raymond)
	2–3	30:32 – Karlsson (Nylander)
Barkov (Kakko, Määttä) – 37:05	3–3
Granlund (Mikkola) – 61:49	4–3

4 min
Penalties
4 min
21
Shots
24

February 15; 8 p.m.	United States	3–1 (1–1, 1–0, 1–0)	Canada	Bell Centre, Montreal; Attendance: 21,105

Game reference

Connor Hellebuyck
Goalies
Jordan Binnington
Referees:
(Canada) Gord Dwyer
(Canada) Jean Hebert
Linesmen:
(United States) Ryan Daisy
(Canada) Kiel Murchison

	0–1	05:31 – McDavid (Doughty, Binnington)
Guentzel (Eichel, Werenski) – 10:15	1–1
Larkin (Boldy) – 33:33	2–1
Guentzel (Larkin, Faber) (EN) – 58:41	3–1

19 min
Penalties
17 min
23
Shots
26

February 17; 1 p.m.	Canada	5–3 (3–0, 1–0, 1–3)	Finland	TD Garden, Boston; Attendance: 17,238

Game reference

Jordan Binnington
Goalies
Kevin Lankinen
Juuse Saros
Referees:
(United States) Chris Rooney
(Canada) Jean Hebert
Linesmen:
(Canada) Scott Cherrey
(Canada) Kiel Murchison

McDavid – 04:13	1–0
MacKinnon (Reinhart, Hagel) – 04:59	2–0
Point (Sanheim, McDavid) – 13:02	3–0
MacKinnon (Crosby, Reinhart) – 25:03	4–0
	4–1	53:19 – Lindell (Lehkonen)
	4–2	58:20 – Granlund (Laine)
	4–3	58:43 – Granlund (Barkov, Aho)
Crosby (Reinhart) (EN) – 59:04	5–3

2 min
Penalties
0 min
28
Shots
26

February 17; 8 p.m.	Sweden	2–1 (2–1, 0–0, 0–0)	United States	TD Garden, Boston; Attendance: 17,850

Game reference

Samuel Ersson
Goalies
Jake Oettinger
Referees:
(Canada) Wes McCauley (replaced by (Canada) Pierre Lambert after P1)
(Canada) Gord Dwyer
Linesmen:
(Canada) Jonny Murray
(United States) Ryan Daisy

	0–1	00:35 – Kreider (Werenski, Eichel)
Nyquist (Karlsson, Arvidsson) – 13:36	1–1
Bratt (Nylander) – 19:04	2–1

6 min
Penalties
6 min
23
Shots
32

=== Final ===
February 20; 8 p.m.	Canada	3–2 OT (1–1, 1–1, 0–0) (OT: 1–0)	United States	TD Garden, Boston; Attendance: 17,850

Game reference

Jordan Binnington
Goalies
Connor Hellebuyck
Referees:
(Canada) Gord Dwyer
(United States) Chris Rooney
Linesmen:
(Canada) Scott Cherrey
(Canada) Jonny Murray

MacKinnon (Harley, Reinhart) – 04:48	1–0
	1–1	16:52 – B. Tkachuk (Matthews)
	1–2	27:32 – Sanderson (Matthews, Werenski)
Bennett (Marner) – 34:00	2–2
McDavid (Marner, Makar) – 68:18	3–2

0 min
Penalties
2 min
27
Shots
33

== Statistics ==
=== Scoring leaders ===
The following players led the tournament in points.

Player	GP	G	A	Pts	+/–	PIM
(United States) Zach Werenski	4	0	6	6	+3	2
(Canada) Connor McDavid	4	3	2	5	–1	0
(Canada) Sidney Crosby	4	1	4	5	+2	2
(Canada) Nathan MacKinnon	4	4	0	4	+4	0
(United States) Jake Guentzel	4	3	1	4	+2	2
(Finland) Mikael Granlund	3	3	1	4	–1	0
(Canada) Sam Reinhart	4	0	4	4	+1	0
(United States) Jack Eichel	4	0	4	4	+1	0
(United States) Brady Tkachuk	4	3	0	3	+3	5
(United States) Matthew Tkachuk	3	2	1	3	0	5

=== Leading goaltenders ===
The following goaltenders led the tournament in save percentage (minimum 40% of team's total ice time).

Player	GP	TOI	W	L	OTL	GA	SO	SV%	GAA
(United States) Connor Hellebuyck	3	188:18	2	0	1	5	0	.932	1.59
(Canada) Jordan Binnington	4	252:43	3	1	0	10	0	.907	2.37
(Finland) Juuse Saros	2	91:00	0	1	0	6	0	.870	3.96
(Sweden) Filip Gustavsson	2	85:52	0	0	1	6	0	.813	4.19
(Finland) Kevin Lankinen	2	86:52	1	1	0	7	0	.811	4.84

== Broadcasting ==
The tournament was broadcast by the NHL's North American rightsholders. It was televised exclusively in Canada on Sportsnet in English and TVA Sports in French, and streamed on Sportsnet+. In the United States, the tournament was split between the ESPN networks and TNT Sports. ESPN-produced games were further split, with two games on the cable channel ESPN and two games carried on broadcast television by ABC. Three games were also carried by ESPN Deportes in Spanish. All ESPN-produced games were streamed on ESPN+, and Disney+ also streamed both the one round-robin game and the championship game between Canada and the United States. TNT Sports' games were simulcast on TNT and TruTV, and streamed on Max via Bleacher Report sports. Canadian rightsholder, Sportsnet, served as host broadcaster for all games, including those held in the United States.

The tournament was highly viewed in North America; in the United States, the championship game was seen by an average of 9.3 million viewers, overtaking game seven of the 2019 Stanley Cup Final as the fourth-highest rated NHL telecast of all time (behind game six of the 1973 Stanley Cup Final). Sportsnet reported an average of 5.7 million viewers in the championship game, ranking behind only game seven of the 2024 Stanley Cup Final as the second-highest rated hockey telecast in network history.

Country	Broadcaster(s)	Reference(s)
Canada	Sportsnet/Sportsnet+ (English); TVA Sports (French)	
Finland	Nelonen/Ruutu	
Sweden	Viaplay/TV6	
United States	TNT/TruTV/Max (English) (February 12 and 17); ESPN/ESPN+ (English) (February 13 and 20); ABC/ESPN+ (English) (February 15); Disney+ (English) (February 15 and 20 USA v CAN games only); ESPN Deportes (Spanish) (February 13, 15, and 20)	
