= Nikolas Matinpalo =

Finnish ice hockey player (born 1998)

- Born: 5 October 1998 (age 27) Espoo, Finland
- Height: 6 ft 3 in (191 cm)
- Weight: 207 lb (94 kg; 14 st 11 lb)
- Position: Defence
- Shoots: Right
- NHL team Former teams: Ottawa Senators; Ilves; Ässät
- National team: Finland
- NHL draft: Undrafted
- Playing career: 2018–present

Nikolas Matinpalo (born 5 October 1998) is a Finnish professional ice hockey player who is a defenceman for the Ottawa Senators of the National Hockey League (NHL).

== Playing career ==
=== Finland ===
Matinpalo made his Liiga debut with Ilves during the 2018–19 season. He made 30 appearances for Ilves in the regular season, scoring two goals and four assists for six points. He also appeared in two games for KooVee Tampere of Mestis going scoreless. Ilves beat SaiPa in the qualifying round of the playoffs, but were eliminated by Oulun Kärpät in the quarterfinals. Matinpalo made seven playoff appearances, going scoreless. He returned to Ilves for the 2019–20 season and played in 33 games registering one assist. He also spent 13 games with KooVoo Tampere of Mestis, tallying one goal and three points. However, on 13 March 2020, the remainder of the season and playoffs were cancelled due to the COVID-19 pandemic.

He began the 2020–21 season with Ilves and made 11 appearances, going scoreless. He also played one game for KooVoo Tampere. On 24 January 2021, Matinpalo was traded to Ässät for Niklas Peltomäki. In 30 games with Ässät to finish the season, he marked one goal and three points. In the 2021–22 season, he marked four goals and eight assists in 50 games in his first full season in Liiga. On 20 April 2022, it was announced that Matinpalo had signed a one-year extension to remain with Ässät. In his final year with the team in 2022–23, he set new career highs with 51 appearances, with seven goals and 16 points. Ässät knocked off TPS in the qualifying round to advance to the quarterfinals. There they faced Ilves, who eliminated them. In eight playoff games, Matinpalo tallied four assists.

=== Ottawa Senators ===
Matinpalo was signed as an undrafted free agent to a one-year, entry-level contract by the Ottawa Senators of the National Hockey League (NHL) on 26 May 2023. He attended the 2023 Senators training camp but did not make the team. He was assigned to Ottawa's American Hockey League (AHL) affiliate, the Belleville Senators, to begin the 2023–24 season. After injuries to Thomas Chabot and Erik Brännström, Matinpalo was recalled by Ottawa on 28 October. He played in his first NHL game the same day, a 5–2 win over the Pittsburgh Penguins. He was returned to Belleville after four games with Ottawa on 10 November. Matinpalo spent the rest of the season with Belleville, playing in 67 games, scoring four goals and 14 points. Belleville made the playoffs and faced the Toronto Marlies in the first round, who they beat. The Senators then went against the Cleveland Monsters in the second round, who eliminated them. In seven playoff games, Matinpalo went scoreless.

On 20 June 2024, Matinpalo signed a one-year, two-way contract extension with Ottawa. He passed through waivers, going unclaimed, and was assigned to Belleville to start the 2024–25 season. He was recalled to Ottawa on 28 December as an injury replacement for Artem Zub. He made his season debut on 29 December in a 3–1 victory over the Minnesota Wild. He was briefly returned to Belleville on 3 January 2025 before being recalled again on 7 January. He made 24 appearances for Belleville, tallying two goals and eight points. He recorded his first NHL point on 13 March, assisting on Tyler Kleven's goal in a 6–3 win over the Boston Bruins. He recorded his first NHL goal in a 4–0 victory over the Columbus Blue Jackets on 6 April. The Senators qualified for the playoffs, facing the Toronto Maple Leafs in the opening round. He made his playoff debut on 20 April. The Senators were eliminated in six games in their best-of-seven series. In the series, Matinpalo went scoreless.

On 5 May 2025, Matinpalo signed a two-year, one-way contract extension with Ottawa. In 50 games, he added five assists. The Senators made the playoffs again, but were swept in the first round by the Carolina Hurricanes. Matinpalo went scoreless in the four games.

== International play ==
Medal record

Representing Finland

Ice hockey

Olympic Games
Bronze medal – third place	2026 Milano Cortina	

World Championships
Gold medal – first place	2026 Switzerland	

Matinpalo represented Finland during the 2023 IIHF World Championship. The team finished seventh in the tournament. In February 2025, Matinpalo was called up to Finland's roster replacing defenseman Rasmus Ristolainen during the Four Nations Face-Off. In January 2026, he was named to Finland roster for the 2026 Winter Olympics and won a bronze medal.

== Career statistics ==
=== Regular season and playoffs ===
			Regular season					Playoffs
Season	Team	League	GP	G	A	Pts	PIM	GP	G	A	Pts	PIM
2014–15	Blues Akatemia	FIN U18	25	1	2	3	16	—	—	—	—	—
2015–16	Blues Akatemia	FIN U18	47	9	11	20	75	—	—	—	—	—
2016–17	Blues	FIN U20	33	1	6	7	37	2	0	1	1	0
2016–17	Blues Akatemia	FIN.2 U20	5	0	1	1	8	—	—	—	—	—
2017–18	Blues	FIN U20	52	7	14	21	59	4	0	0	0	2
2017–18	Blues Akatemia	FIN.2 U20	1	1	1	2	2	—	—	—	—	—
2018–19	Ilves	Liiga	30	2	4	6	10	7	0	0	0	4
2018–19	KOOVEE	Mestis	2	0	0	0	0	—	—	—	—	—
2019–20	Ilves	Liiga	33	0	1	1	47	—	—	—	—	—
2019–20	KOOVEE	Mestis	13	1	2	3	10	—	—	—	—	—
2020–21	Ilves	Liiga	11	0	0	0	6	—	—	—	—	—
2020–21	KOOVEE	Mestis	1	0	1	1	0	—	—	—	—	—
2020–21	Ässät	Liiga	30	1	2	3	18	—	—	—	—	—
2021–22	Ässät	Liiga	50	4	4	8	20	—	—	—	—	—
2022–23	Ässät	Liiga	51	7	9	16	20	8	0	4	4	4
2023–24	Belleville Senators	AHL	67	4	10	14	26	7	0	0	0	4
2023–24	Ottawa Senators	NHL	4	0	0	0	0	—	—	—	—	—
2024–25	Belleville Senators	AHL	24	2	6	8	10	—	—	—	—	—
2024–25	Ottawa Senators	NHL	41	1	3	4	20	6	0	0	0	2
2025–26	Ottawa Senators	NHL	50	0	5	5	16	4	0	0	0	2
Liiga totals			205	14	20	34	121	15	0	4	4	8
NHL totals			95	1	8	9	36	10	0	0	0	4

=== International ===
Year	Team	Event	Result	GP	G	A	Pts	PIM
2023	Finland	WC	7th	8	1	2	3	0
2025	Finland	4NF	4th	3	0	0	0	2
2025	Finland	WC	7th	8	1	1	2	4
2026	Finland	OG	3rd place, bronze medalist(s)	5	1	0	1	0
2026	Finland	WC	1st place, gold medalist(s)	10	0	0	0	6
Senior totals				34	3	3	6	12

== Bibliography ==
- Chaimovitch, Jason, ed. (2025). 2025–2026 American Hockey League Official Guide & Record Book. Springfield, Massachusetts: American Hockey League. OCLC 22147888.
