= Olli Määttä =

Finnish ice hockey player (born 1994)

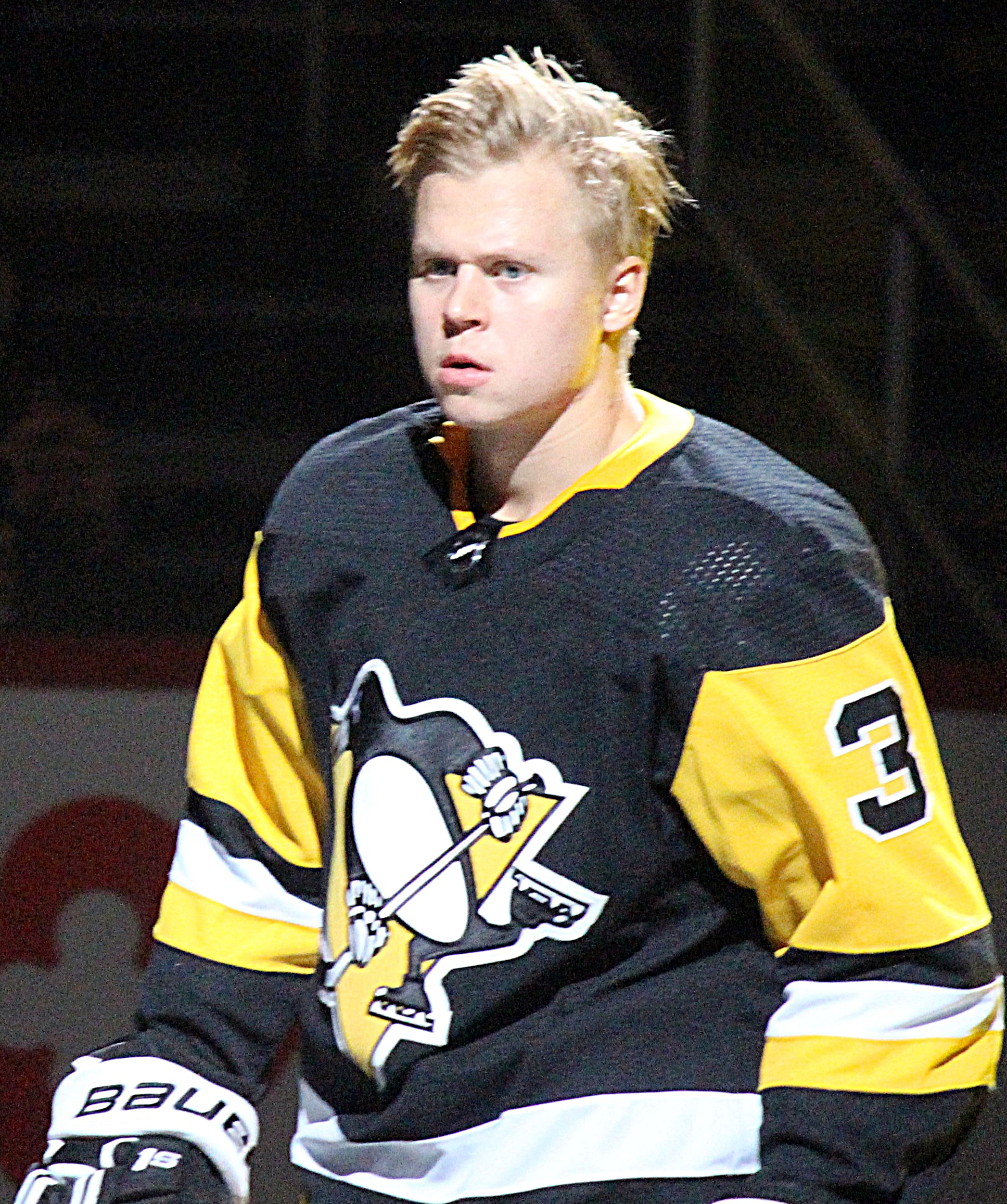
- Määttä with the Pittsburgh Penguins in 2017
- Born: 22 August 1994 (age 32) Jyväskylä, Finland
- Height: 6 ft 2 in (188 cm)
- Weight: 206 lb (93 kg; 14 st 10 lb)
- Position: Defence
- Shoots: Left
- NHL team Former teams: Minnesota Wild; Pittsburgh Penguins; Chicago Blackhawks; Los Angeles Kings; Detroit Red Wings; Utah Mammoth; Calgary Flames
- National team: Finland
- NHL draft: 22nd overall, 2012; Pittsburgh Penguins
- Playing career: 2009–present

Olli Määttä (born 22 August 1994) is a Finnish professional ice hockey player who is a defenceman for the Minnesota Wild of the National Hockey League (NHL). He was drafted in the first round, 22nd overall, by the Pittsburgh Penguins in the 2012 NHL entry draft. Määttä has also played for the Chicago Blackhawks, Los Angeles Kings, Detroit Red Wings, Utah Mammoth, and Calgary Flames.

Määttä was the first overall selection in the 2011 Canadian Hockey League Import Draft, and played for the Finnish junior team at the 2011 IIHF World U18 Championships and the 2011, 2012 and 2013 World Junior Ice Hockey Championships. Known for his shot-blocking ability and hockey IQ, Määttä was named to Finland's roster for the 2014 Winter Olympics as a 19-year-old.

== Playing career ==
=== Junior ===
Määttä began his junior career playing for his home-town team's under-16 program. As a 14-year-old, he played one game for JYP U16 in the Jr. C SM-sarja classification. The next year, Määttä scored 19 points in seven games to help the JYP U16 squad to a 4–2–2 record in the qualifiers, enough to avoid relegation. Once the full season started, Määttä was named an assistant captain and played at a point-per-game pace, finishing the season with 22 points in 21 games (including nine goals), third for team scoring and first among defencemen. Määttä's play was strong enough for him to receive a two-game call-up to JYP's under-18 team in the Jr. B division. Määttä then played one game playing for JYP's under-20 team in their relegation round, helping save the team from dropping out of the Jr. A SM-Liiga. Amongst all the recognition, Määttä also found himself on Finland's national under-16 team, posting 13 points in 13 games.

The next season, as he turned 16 during the summer, Määttä was automatically promoted to JYP under-18 team, but was swiftly promoted after only one game to the under-20 team. While splitting his time between JYP U20 and the D Team in the Mestis (second division) classification—the second-highest level of ice hockey in Finland—Määttä once again found time to participate on Finland's national teams, playing for both the under-18 and -20 teams. At the under-18 tournament, he led all Finnish defenceman in scoring with four points and helped Finland to a fifth-place finish. Määttä did not perform nearly as well at the 2011 World Junior Championships, however, going pointless in six games, though he became the youngest player ever to play for Finland's World Junior team, a record that has since been broken by Aleksander Barkov. At the end of the season, Määttä returned to JYP's U20 team en route to an eventual league championship. Määttä finished with five points in 12 games.

After his accomplishments at the various levels of Finland's junior leagues, Määttä was selected 85th overall by SKA Saint Petersburg in the 2011 KHL Draft, then first overall by the London Knights in the 2011 CHL Import Draft two months later. He ultimately accepted the latter invitation to play major junior in Canada, thus beginning his Ontario Hockey League (OHL) career the following autumn with London.

==== London Knights ====
Määttä joined a London team primed to make a run for the J. Ross Robertson Cup. The Knights won their first five games by a combined score of 31–10 and did not look back. London ended the regular season with the best record in the OHL (49–18–0–1) and the top defence in their conference. Along the way to posting a +25 plus-minus rating for the team, Määttä paced the team in defensive scoring with 32 points in 58 games, despite missing 6 games in the middle of the season to play for Finland at the 2012 World Junior Championships. Seeking to improve on Finland's sixth-place finish in 2011, Määttä was expected to be a key contributor for his team, but in the tournament opener he was concussed on a hit by Canada's Boone Jenner and missed the remainder of the tournament. Finland ultimately finished fourth without him. In the OHL playoffs, Määttä continued his strong play, only being held pointless in just five of London's 19 post-season games. As the Knights rolled through each series, losing only three games on their way to their first title since 2004–05, Määttä finished tied for the team lead in scoring with 23 points in 19 games.

In winning the J. Ross Robertson Cup, London received a berth at the 2012 Memorial Cup held in Shawinigan, Quebec. In the three round-robin games against the Edmonton Oil Kings, Saint John Sea Dogs and the Shawinigan Cataractes, Määttä was held scoreless as the Knights were able to win two of the games and receive a subsequent bye to the championship game. After a five-day wait, London matched up against hosts Shawinigan, the only team to have beaten them in the round-robin. A defensive struggle, the game went to overtime after a 1–1 scoreline after regulation, where the Cataractes' Anton Zlobin ultimately ended the game with his second goal of the night, spoiling the Knights' stellar season.

After the season and leading up to the 2012 NHL entry draft on 22 June, Määttä was ranked as the eighth-best North American skater. He was selected by the draft hosts, Pittsburgh Penguins, with the 22nd selection in the first round. He attended the Penguins' developmental camp in July, along with several other prospects—including London teammate Scott Harrington— and in mid-September signed an entry-level contract with the Penguins.

Määttä began the 2012–13 season with two points in his first four games, though his offensive numbers began to pick up about a month into the season, as the Knights went on a 24–0 streak between 1 November 2012 and 1 January 2013. In late December, Määttä joined Finland for the 2013 World Junior Championships. Määttä was outshined by fellow Finnish defencemen Rasmus Ristolainen and Ville Pokka as Finland finished fourth in its pool, sending the team to the relegation round. Finland easily won its two relegation matches to stay in the top tier, though a seventh-place finish in the ten-nation tournament was nonetheless considered a disappointment.

Upon his return to London, Määttä registered two assists in his next nine games. He rediscovered his game in early February and carried it through the end of the year, pushing London to its second straight first-place finish (50–13–2–3) this time with the second-best offense in the OHL and the number three defence. Once again London rolled through its conference to the OHL title game, losing only two games in the process, but they faced stiffer competition for the J. Ross Robertson Cup from the Barrie Colts. Määttä registered a point in all but one game. London quickly found themselves down three game to one but rallied to force a seventh game at home. Määttä lead a defensive effort that held Barrie to fewer than four goals for just the second time in the series, as well as scoring the Knight's second goal and securing London's second League title in as many years with a 3–2 victory.

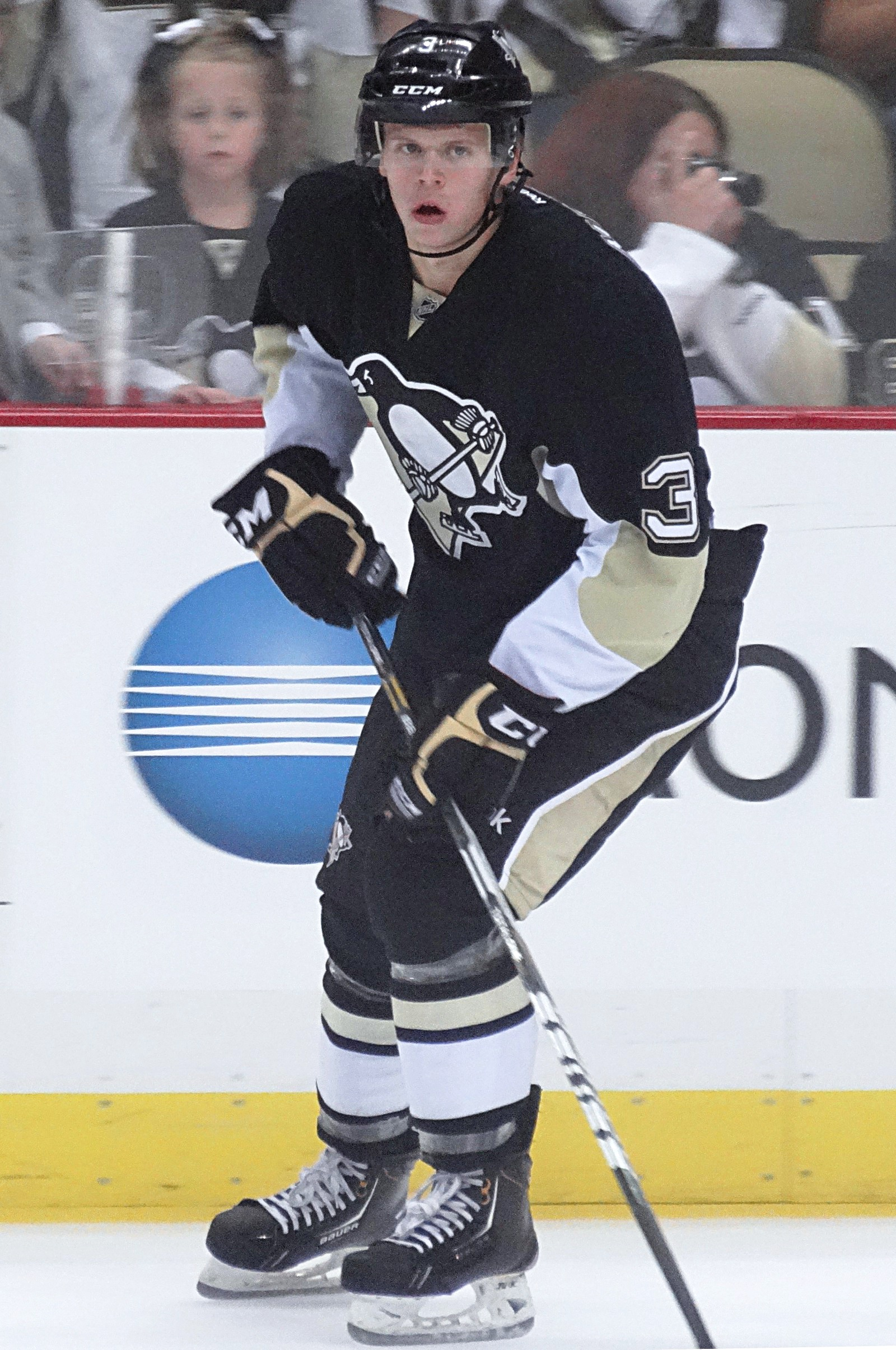
Määttä with the Pittsburgh Penguins in October 2013.

With London looking to redeem their loss in the Memorial Cup title game from the previous year, the Knights and Määttä began the 2013 Memorial Cup tournament strong, defeating the host Saskatoon Blades 3–2 in the Cup opener. Määttä again, however, failed to record a point in any of the Knights' three round-robin games as London lost its two remaining games by 3–6 and 2–9 scorelines against Western Hockey League (WHL) and Quebec Major Junior Hockey League (QMJHL) champions Portland and Halifax, respectively. (Määttä was only on the ice for three even-strength goals against in the two games.) The Knights' 1–2 record sent them into the tie-breaker game with Saskatoon, where London recovered their defensive game, routing the Blades 6–1. The next day, the team had to get past Portland in the semifinal and were once again sharp defensively, holding the WHL's top offensive to just two goals in the game, though they were only able to score one goal themselves. For his part, Määttä was held scoreless as well as being on the ice for both of Portland's goals in the season-ending game.

=== Professional ===
==== Pittsburgh Penguins ====
Määttä's solid performance during the Pittsburgh Penguins' training camp, buoyed by an injury to defenceman Kris Letang, earned him a spot on the team's NHL roster to begin the 2013–14 season. He scored the first points of his NHL career on 8 October 2013, assisting on two goals by Jussi Jokinen in the Penguins' 5–2 win over the Carolina Hurricanes. On 19 October, Määttä then scored his first career NHL goal against Vancouver Canucks goaltender Roberto Luongo. Through the Christmas holiday, Määttä had appeared in every game the Penguins had played in and, through the first two months of the season, was playing typical minutes for a third-pair defencemen (usually under 20 minutes per game). However, due to a rash of injuries suffered by other Penguins' blueliners (notably the broken legs by Rob Scuderi and Paul Martin), Määttä saw an uptick in his ice time, going from an average of just over 16 minutes in October and November to 21 1/2 minutes a game through four weeks in December. This increased time was not wasted, as Määttä increased his point production from five points in 28 games in the first two months to seven points in 12 games in December. As a member of the top defensive pair for Pittsburgh (alongside either Kris Letang or Matt Niskanen), Määttä played a key role in the Penguins' 10–2 run in the absence of much of their defensive corps, allowing more than three goals only once in that 12-game span.

On 6 March 2014, Määttä scored his first multi-goal game in the NHL with two tallies in the Penguins' 5–3 loss to the San Jose Sharks.

On 9 October 2014, in the Penguins' first game of the 2014–15 season, Määttä recorded three assists in a 6–4 win over the Anaheim Ducks. During a press conference on 27 October, it was announced that Määttä would undergo surgery to remove a tumor from his neck that could be a low-grade thyroid cancer. On 4 November, he underwent successful surgery and was expected to make a full recovery, and on 18 November, just two weeks after his surgery, it was announced that he would be returning to the Penguins lineup to play that night against the Montreal Canadiens. On 6 December, Määttä re-injured the same shoulder he had surgery on during the off-season—he would go on to miss 16 games before the Penguins would announce, on 13 January 2015, that he would miss the remainder of the season to have another surgery to repair the shoulder. During this time he was also diagnosed with the mumps.

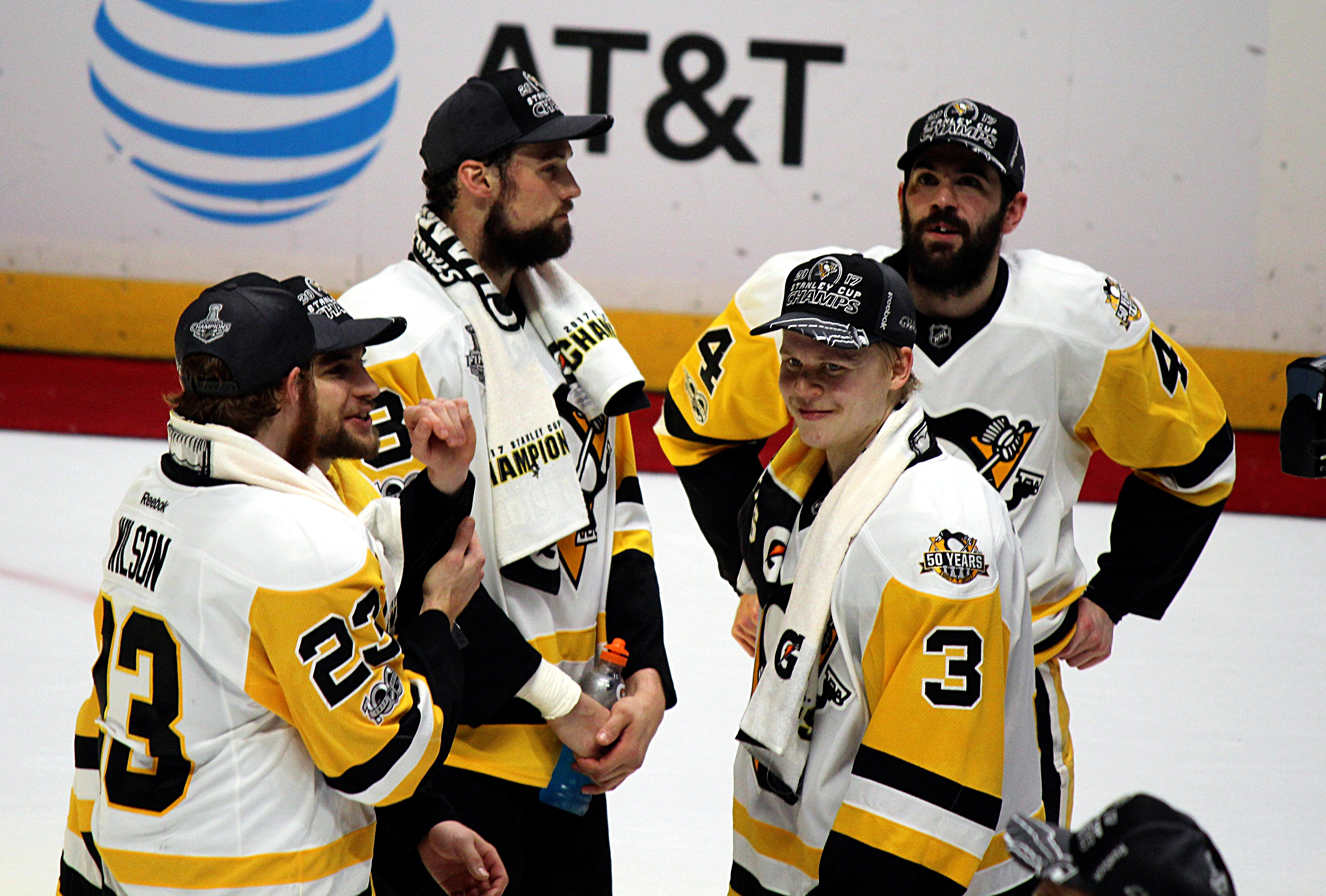
Määttä won the Stanley Cup with the Penguins in 2016 and 2017.

On 18 November 2015, Määttä was slammed from behind into the Minnesota Wild's bench door by Minnesota Wild's right wing Nino Niederreiter, causing him to miss 3–4 weeks with an upper body injury. Määttä experienced soft tissue and muscle damage to his midsection from the boarding. Niederreiter was not suspended for the hit.

In Game Two of the Stanley Cup Playoffs against the Washington Capitals, Brooks Orpik delivered an illegal and late hit to Määttä's head. Orpik was suspended 3 games for the late hit. Määttä returned a few games later and finished the series. Määttä won the Stanley Cup with the Penguins in the 2016 playoffs.

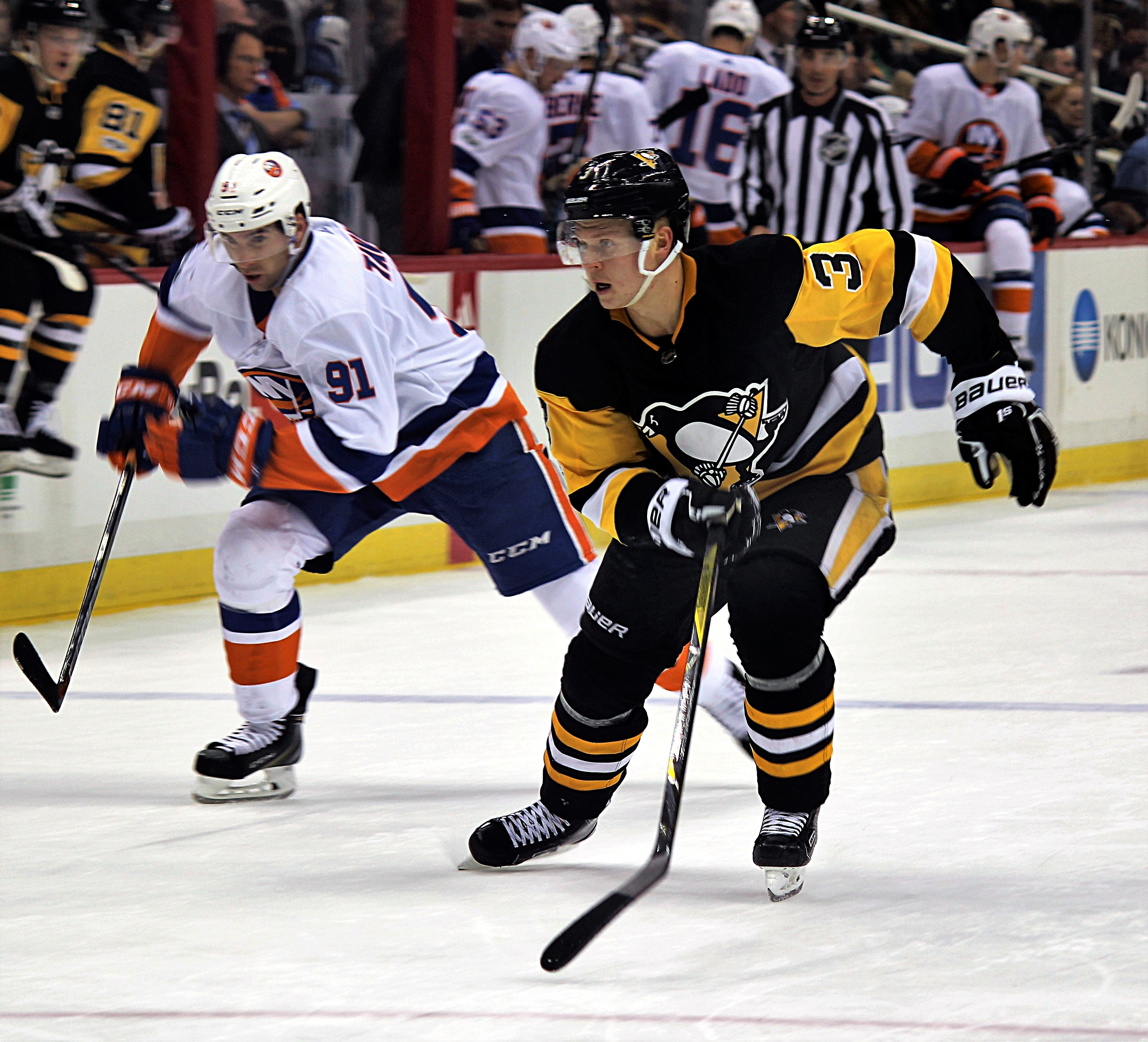
Määttä (right) races John Tavares for the puck in a game against the New York Islanders in 2017.

Määttä left a game against the Winnipeg Jets on 17 February in the second period due to an undisclosed injury. It was later confirmed that Määttä would be out for 6 weeks after undergoing surgery for a broken hand. Määttä returned to the Penguins lineup for the last game of the 2016–17 regular season after missing 24 games.

During the 2017–18 season, Määttä played in his 300th career NHL game against the Washington Capitals on 1 April 2018. He ended the regular season playing in all 82 games and recording 29 points, tying his career high.

Määttä recorded 1 goal and 13 assists for 14 points in the 2018–19 season, placing third on the team with 116 blocked shots and 97 hits in 60 regular-season games.

==== Chicago Blackhawks ====
On 15 June 2019, Määttä was traded to the Chicago Blackhawks in exchange for Dominik Kahun and a 2019 fifth-round draft pick. In the 2019–20 season, he tallied four goals and 17 points in 65 games with the Blackhawks, while averaging 18:25 time on ice. In nine post-season games, he led the team with a plus-seven rating and paced the blueline in scoring with three goals and six points.

==== Los Angeles Kings ====
On 4 October 2020, Määttä was traded to the Los Angeles Kings in exchange for Brad Morrison.

==== Detroit Red Wings ====
On 13 July 2022, Määttä signed a one-year, $2.25 million contract with the Detroit Red Wings. On 16 February 2023, Määttä signed a two-year, $6 million contract extension with the Red Wings.

Entering his final season under contract with the Red Wings in 2024–25 season, Määttä in a third-pairing role was scoreless through seven games.

==== Utah Mammoth ====
With the Utah Mammoth suffering a depleted blueline through injury to start their inaugural season, Määttä was traded from the Red Wings to Utah in exchange for a third-round pick in 2025 on 29 October 2024.

==== Calgary Flames ====
During the 2025–26 season, in his second season with Utah, Määttä was traded by the Mammoth along with Jonathan Castagna and three second-round selections in 2026 to the Calgary Flames in exchange for MacKenzie Weegar on 4 March 2026.

==== Minnesota Wild ====
On 2 July 2026, Määttä, alongside Blake Coleman, were traded to the Minnesota Wild in exchange for Jacob Middleton, a 2027 third-round pick, a 2028 fourth-round pick, and a 2029 second-round pick.

== International play ==
Medal record

Men's ice hockey

Representing Finland

Winter Olympics
Bronze medal – third place	2014 Sochi	
Bronze medal – third place	2026 Milano Cortina	

World Championships
Gold medal – first place	2026 Switzerland	
Silver medal – second place	2021 Latvia	

Määttä played for the IIHF World Junior Championships in 2011, 2012, and 2013. In the 2011 edition, he became the youngest-ever Finnish player to participate in the under-20 tournament. In a game against Canada, Määttä was injured from a hit by Boone Jenner, suffering a concussion, thus ending his tournament. Määttä returned to the international scene to play at the 2011 IIHF World U18 Championships, when he served as an assistant captain for Finland's under-18 team. He was selected by the coaches as one of the Finns' top three players at the tournament, alongside Joel Armia and Miikka Salomäki.

In 2014, Määttä was invited to play for his country in the 2014 Sochi Winter Olympics with the Finnish men's team. He was one of the team's top point producers, scoring five points (three goals and two assists), in addition to posting a +1 plus-minus rating, over six games. Määttä capped off his strong Olympic performance with Finland's final goal of the tournament, coming in the third period of a 5–0 victory over the United States in the bronze medal game.

In 2016, Määttä was once again invited to play for Team Finland, this time in the World Cup of Hockey 2016. Despite scoring in the pre-tournament games, Määttä went scoreless in the tournament.

In 2021, Määttä would play for Team Finland in his first World Championship appearance, narrowly losing to Team Canada in the final gold medal game.

In 2024, Määttä was selected to play for Team Finland in the 2025 4 Nations Face-Off.

== Personal life ==
Määttä began playing hockey in 2000 after he complained to his parents that all of the other kids were allowed to play hockey. Määttä has two older brothers, Antti and Eero.

== Career statistics ==
=== Regular season and playoffs ===
			Regular season					Playoffs
Season	Team	League	GP	G	A	Pts	PIM	GP	G	A	Pts	PIM
2008–09	JYP	FIN U16	1	0	0	0	2	—	—	—	—	—
2009–10	JYP	FIN U16	7	6	13	19	12	—	—	—	—	—
2009–10	JYP	FIN U16	21	9	13	22	20	3	0	1	1	2
2009–10	JYP	FIN U18	2	0	0	0	0	—	—	—	—	—
2010–11	JYP	FIN U18	1	0	0	0	0	—	—	—	—	—
2010–11	JYP	FIN U20	19	2	6	8	8	12	1	4	5	6
2010–11	D Team	Mestis	23	1	5	6	6	—	—	—	—	—
2011–12	London Knights	OHL	58	5	27	32	25	19	6	17	23	2
2012–13	London Knights	OHL	57	8	30	38	30	21	4	10	14	8
2012–13	Wilkes–Barre/Scranton Penguins	AHL	—	—	—	—	—	3	0	0	0	0
2013–14	Pittsburgh Penguins	NHL	78	9	20	29	14	13	0	4	4	0
2014–15	Pittsburgh Penguins	NHL	20	1	8	9	10	—	—	—	—	—
2015–16	Pittsburgh Penguins	NHL	67	6	13	19	22	18	0	7	7	4
2016–17	Pittsburgh Penguins	NHL	55	1	6	7	12	25	2	6	8	12
2017–18	Pittsburgh Penguins	NHL	82	7	22	29	28	12	0	2	2	4
2018–19	Pittsburgh Penguins	NHL	60	1	13	14	12	1	0	0	0	0
2019–20	Chicago Blackhawks	NHL	65	4	13	17	20	9	3	3	6	4
2020–21	Los Angeles Kings	NHL	41	0	4	4	6	—	—	—	—	—
2021–22	Los Angeles Kings	NHL	66	1	7	8	10	7	0	0	0	0
2022–23	Detroit Red Wings	NHL	78	6	17	23	14	—	—	—	—	—
2023–24	Detroit Red Wings	NHL	72	4	14	18	14	—	—	—	—	—
2024–25	Detroit Red Wings	NHL	7	0	0	0	0	—	—	—	—	—
2024–25	Utah Hockey Club	NHL	70	2	16	18	16	—	—	—	—	—
2025–26	Utah Mammoth	NHL	22	0	1	1	2	—	—	—	—	—
2025–26	Calgary Flames	NHL	21	2	12	14	2	—	—	—	—	—
NHL totals			804	44	166	210	182	85	5	22	27	24

=== International ===
Year	Team	Event	Result	GP	G	A	Pts	PIM
2011	Finland	WJC	6th	6	0	0	0	0
2011	Finland	U18	5th	6	1	3	4	0
2012	Finland	WJC	4th	1	0	0	0	0
2013	Finland	WJC	7th	5	1	2	3	2
2014	Finland	OG	3rd place, bronze medalist(s)	6	3	2	5	0
2016	Finland	WCH	8th	3	0	0	0	0
2021	Finland	WC	2nd place, silver medalist(s)	10	0	2	2	0
2023	Finland	WC	7th	8	0	5	5	0
2024	Finland	WC	8th	8	1	2	3	2
2025	Finland	4NF	4th	3	0	2	2	2
2026	Finland	OG	3rd place, bronze medalist(s)	6	0	1	1	0
2026	Finland	WC	1st place, gold medalist(s)	10	0	2	2	4
Junior totals				18	2	5	7	2
Senior totals				54	4	16	20	8

== Awards and honours ==
Awards	Year	Ref
NHL
Stanley Cup champion	2016, 2017	
Pittsburgh Penguins
Michel Brière Rookie of the Year Award	2014	

Awards and achievements
Preceded by Derrick Pouliot	Pittsburgh Penguins first-round draft pick 2012	Succeeded by Kasperi Kapanen
