= Esa Lindell =

Finnish ice hockey player (born 1994)

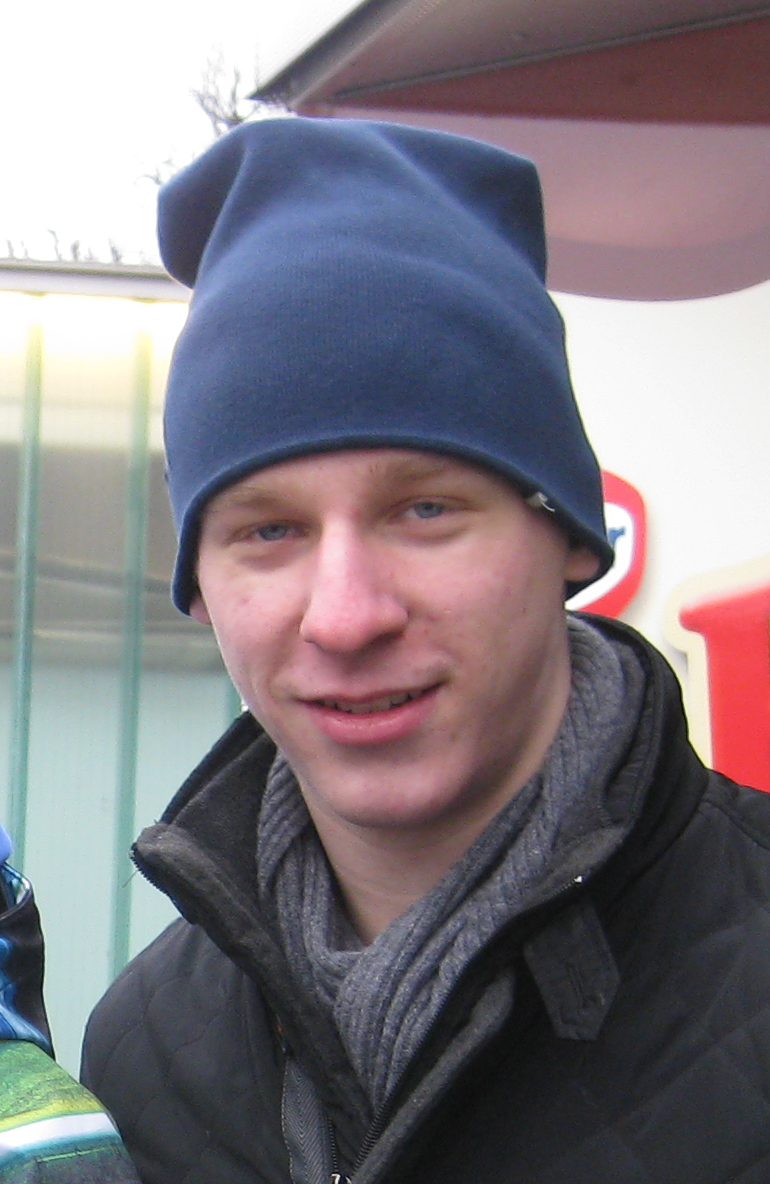
- Lindell in 2014
- Born: 23 May 1994 (age 32) Helsinki, Finland
- Height: 6 ft 3 in (191 cm)
- Weight: 217 lb (98 kg; 15 st 7 lb)
- Position: Defence
- Shoots: Left
- NHL team Former teams: Dallas Stars; Jokerit; Ässät
- National team: Finland
- NHL draft: 74th overall, 2012; Dallas Stars
- Playing career: 2012–present

Esa Lindell (born 23 May 1994) is a Finnish professional ice hockey player who is a defenceman and alternate captain for the Dallas Stars of the National Hockey League (NHL). He was selected by the Stars in the third round, 74th overall, of the 2012 NHL entry draft.

== Playing career ==
Lindell made his SM-liiga debut playing with Jokerit during the 2012–13 season. On 7 May 2014, he signed a three-year, entry-level contract with the Dallas Stars, the organization that had drafted him in the third round, 74th overall, of the 2012 NHL entry draft.

Lindell was reassigned to the Liiga for the 2014–15 season, joining Ässät. He established a career-high year, registering 14 goals and 35 points in 57 games with the club, which led all Liiga defencemen in scoring, before on 16 March 2015 he was assigned by Dallas to the organization's American Hockey League (AHL) affiliate, the Texas Stars.

On 18 January 2016, Lindell received his first NHL call-up. He made his debut the following day on 19 January in Dallas' game against the Los Angeles Kings. On 25 November, in his 17th career NHL game, Lindell scored his first NHL goal, coming in a 2–1 win against the Vancouver Canucks.

In June 2017, Lindell signed a two-year, $4.4 million contract extension with Dallas worth an annual salary cap hit of $2.2 million.

On 16 May 2019, Lindell signed a six-year, $34.8 million contract extension with the Stars, carrying an annual cap hit of $5.8 million.

In February 2020, Lindell was made an alternate captain along with teammate Blake Comeau. Lindell and Tyler Seguin served as alternate captains during home games, while Comeau and John Klingberg served as alternate captains during road games.

On 19 September 2024, Lindell signed a five-year, $26.25 million extension with the Stars, carrying an annual cap hit of $5.25 million.

== International play ==
Medal record

Representing Finland

Ice hockey

Olympic Games
| Bronze medal – third place | 2026 Milano Cortina | |

World Championships
| Gold medal – first place | 2022 Finland | |
| Silver medal – second place | 2016 Russia | |

World Junior Championships
| Gold medal – first place | 2014 Sweden | |

He represented Finland at the 2026 Winter Olympics and won a bronze medal.

== Personal life ==
Lindell joined the ownership group of Jokerit Helsinki in 2023, following the club's departure from the Kontinental Hockey League (KHL) in 2022 and the subsequent restructuring of its operating company. The group includes Jokerit ry and a number of players with ties to the team, including Ossi Väänänen and Teuvo Teräväinen, among others.

== Career statistics ==
=== Regular season and playoffs ===
| | | | Regular season | | | | | Playoffs |
| Season | Team | League | GP | G | A | Pts | PIM | GP | G | A | Pts | PIM |
|---|---|---|---|---|---|---|---|---|---|---|---|---|
| 2010–11 | Jokerit | FIN U18 | 14 | 5 | 7 | 12 | 10 | 4 | 0 | 1 | 1 | 4 |
| 2010–11 | Jokerit | Jr. A | — | — | — | — | — | 3 | 1 | 1 | 2 | 2 |
| 2011–12 | Jokerit | Jr. A | 48 | 21 | 30 | 51 | 16 | 11 | 2 | 5 | 7 | 6 |
| 2011–12 | Kiekko–Vantaa | Mestis | 2 | 0 | 0 | 0 | 0 | — | — | — | — | — |
| 2012–13 | Jokerit | Jr. A | 11 | 5 | 4 | 9 | 6 | 11 | 2 | 5 | 7 | 6 |
| 2012–13 | Jokerit | SM-l | 19 | 0 | 0 | 0 | 4 | — | — | — | — | — |
| 2012–13 | Kiekko–Vantaa | Mestis | 22 | 4 | 6 | 10 | 16 | — | — | — | — | — |
| 2013–14 | Jokerit | SM-l | 44 | 2 | 3 | 5 | 10 | 2 | 0 | 0 | 0 | 0 |
| 2013–14 | Kiekko–Vantaa | Mestis | 11 | 2 | 3 | 5 | 8 | — | — | — | — | — |
| 2014–15 | Ässät | SM-l | 57 | 14 | 21 | 35 | 28 | — | — | — | — | — |
| 2014–15 | Texas Stars | AHL | 5 | 0 | 1 | 1 | 2 | — | — | — | — | — |
| 2015–16 | Texas Stars | AHL | 73 | 14 | 28 | 42 | 56 | 4 | 2 | 2 | 4 | 0 |
| 2015–16 | Dallas Stars | NHL | 4 | 0 | 0 | 0 | 0 | — | — | — | — | — |
| 2016–17 | Dallas Stars | NHL | 73 | 6 | 12 | 18 | 22 | — | — | — | — | — |
| 2016–17 | Texas Stars | AHL | 2 | 0 | 1 | 1 | 0 | — | — | — | — | — |
| 2017–18 | Dallas Stars | NHL | 80 | 7 | 20 | 27 | 24 | — | — | — | — | — |
| 2018–19 | Dallas Stars | NHL | 82 | 11 | 21 | 32 | 33 | 13 | 1 | 3 | 4 | 4 |
| 2019–20 | Dallas Stars | NHL | 69 | 3 | 20 | 23 | 12 | 27 | 1 | 7 | 8 | 2 |
| 2020–21 | Dallas Stars | NHL | 56 | 5 | 11 | 16 | 19 | — | — | — | — | — |
| 2021–22 | Dallas Stars | NHL | 76 | 4 | 21 | 25 | 12 | 7 | 0 | 2 | 2 | 0 |
| 2022–23 | Dallas Stars | NHL | 82 | 8 | 16 | 24 | 10 | 19 | 0 | 3 | 3 | 8 |
| 2023–24 | Dallas Stars | NHL | 82 | 5 | 21 | 26 | 12 | 19 | 3 | 2 | 5 | 4 |
| 2024–25 | Dallas Stars | NHL | 80 | 5 | 21 | 26 | 14 | 18 | 1 | 1 | 2 | 4 |
| 2025–26 | Dallas Stars | NHL | 82 | 6 | 26 | 32 | 20 | 6 | 0 | 1 | 1 | 6 |
| Liiga totals | | | 120 | 16 | 24 | 40 | 42 | 2 | 0 | 0 | 0 | 0 |
| NHL totals | | | 766 | 60 | 189 | 249 | 178 | 109 | 6 | 19 | 25 | 28 |

=== International ===
| Year | Team | Event | Result | GP | G | A | Pts | PIM |
|---|---|---|---|---|---|---|---|---|
| 2011 | Finland | IH18 | 4th | 5 | 1 | 0 | 1 | 14 |
| 2012 | Finland | U18 | 4th | 7 | 0 | 6 | 6 | 2 |
| 2014 | Finland | WJC | 1st place, gold medalist(s) | 7 | 2 | 3 | 5 | 6 |
| 2015 | Finland | WC | 6th | 8 | 1 | 5 | 6 | 0 |
| 2016 | Finland | WC | 2nd place, silver medalist(s) | 10 | 1 | 3 | 4 | 0 |
| 2016 | Finland | WCH | 8th | 1 | 0 | 0 | 0 | 0 |
| 2022 | Finland | WC | 1st place, gold medalist(s) | 6 | 0 | 1 | 1 | 2 |
| 2025 | Finland | 4NF | 4th | 3 | 1 | 0 | 1 | 0 |
| 2026 | Finland | OG | 3rd place, bronze medalist(s) | 6 | 0 | 3 | 3 | 0 |
| Junior totals | | | | 19 | 3 | 9 | 12 | 22 |
| Senior totals | | | | 34 | 3 | 12 | 15 | 2 |
