= Shea Theodore =

Canadian ice hockey player (born 1995)

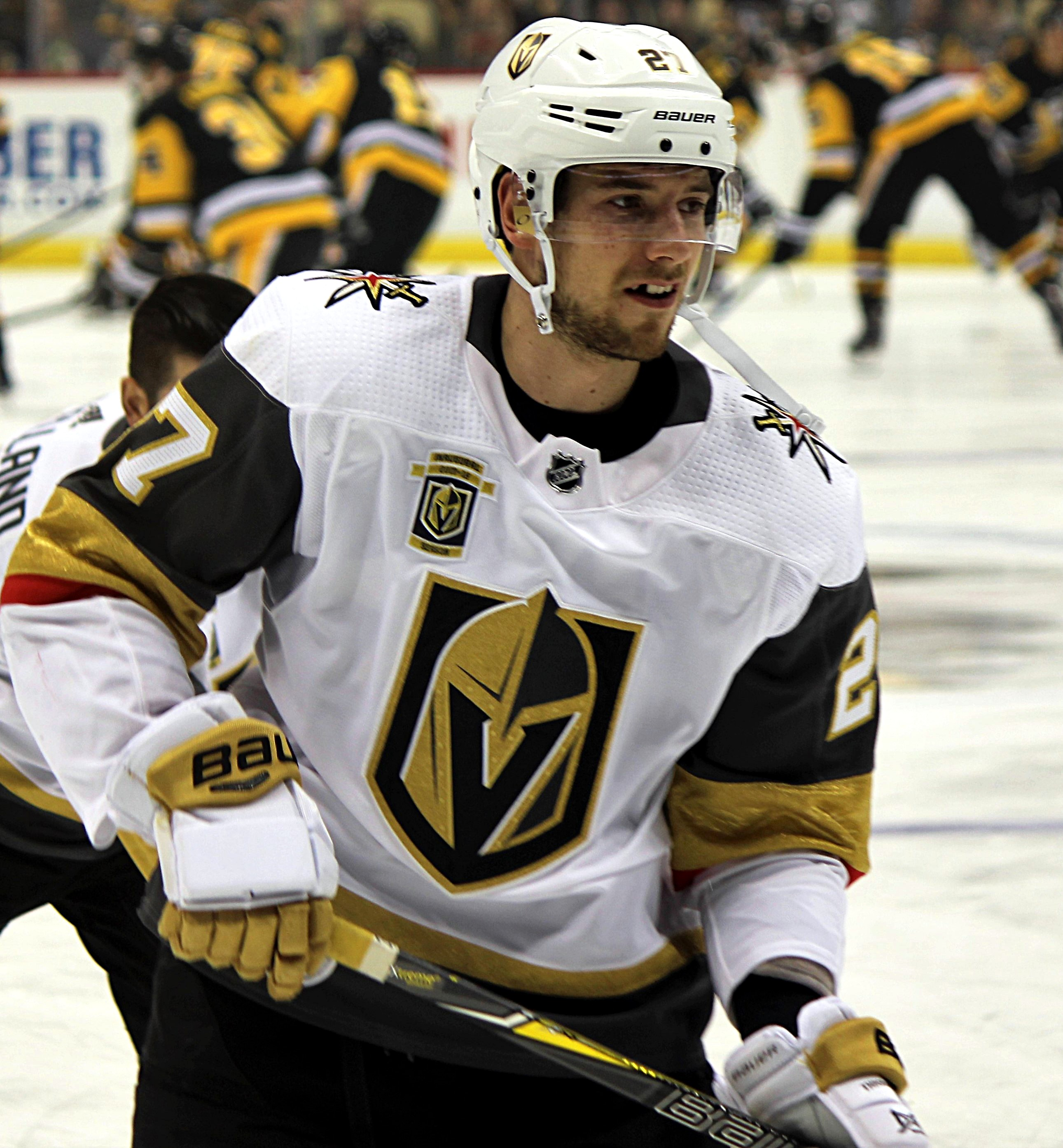
- Theodore with the Vegas Golden Knights in 2018
- Born: August 3, 1995 (age 31) Langley, British Columbia, Canada
- Height: 6 ft 2 in (188 cm)
- Weight: 195 lb (88 kg; 13 st 13 lb)
- Position: Defence
- Shoots: Left
- NHL team Former teams: Vegas Golden Knights; Anaheim Ducks
- National team: Canada
- NHL draft: 26th overall, 2013; Anaheim Ducks
- Playing career: 2014–present

Shea Theodore (born August 3, 1995) is a Canadian professional ice hockey player who is a defenceman for the Vegas Golden Knights of the National Hockey League (NHL). Theodore was selected by the Anaheim Ducks in the first round, 26th overall, of the 2013 NHL entry draft.

Theodore began his minor ice hockey career with the Aldergrove Minor Hockey Association, during which he established himself as the most outstanding player in the team's franchise history. His successful minor career earned him a selection in the 2010 WHL bantam draft, by the Seattle Thunderbirds. During his tenure with the team, Theodore served as captain and competed for Canada at various international tournaments. He won a gold medal at the 2013 World U18 Championships and 2015 World Junior Championships and a silver medal at the 2019 World Championship.

== Playing career ==
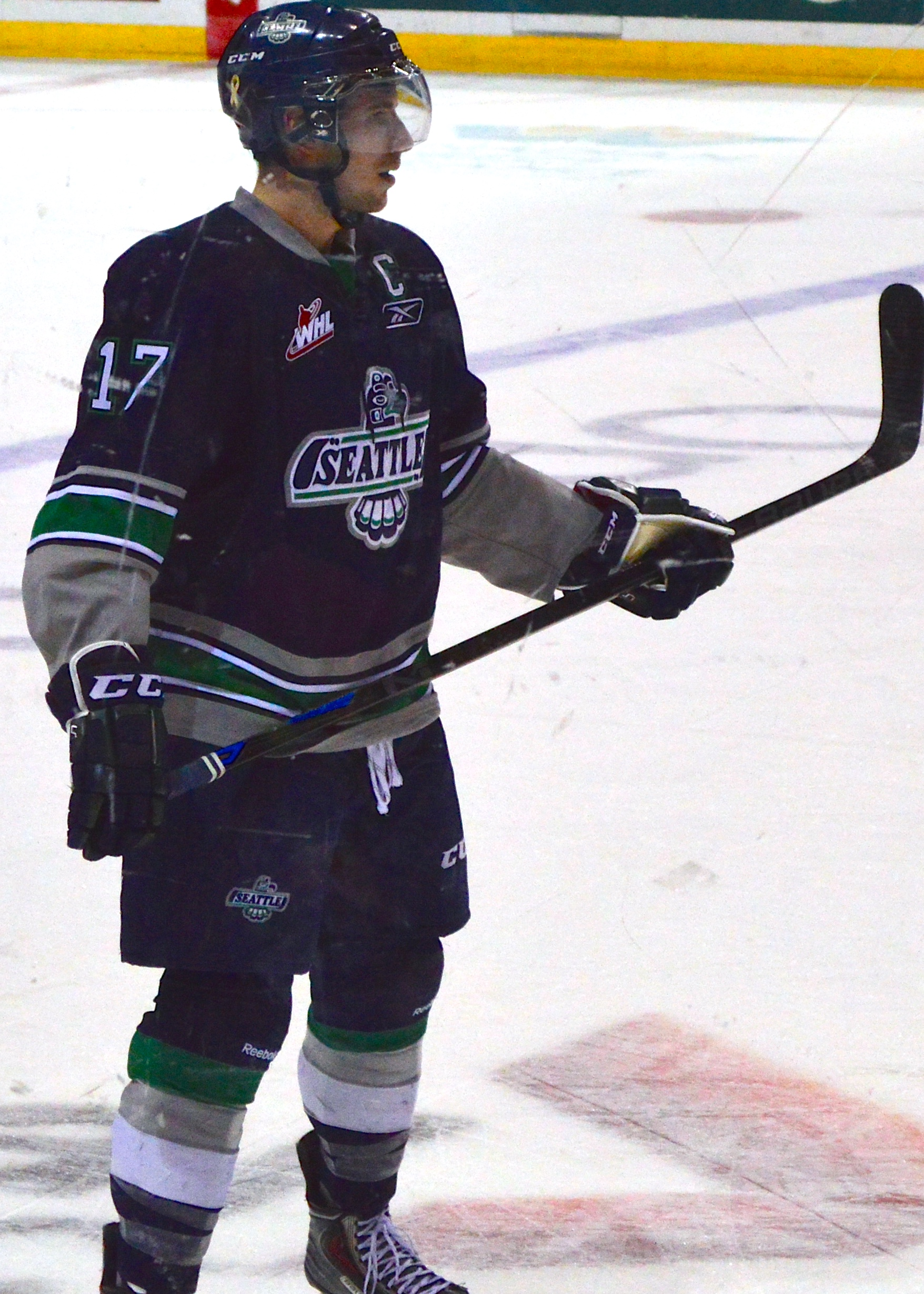
Theodore in 2015 during a game against the Vancouver Giants

=== Youth ===
Theodore began his hockey career in Fraser Valley, opting out of the Burnaby Winter Club. He played minor hockey with the Aldergrove Minor Hockey Association during the 2009–10 season prior to his Bantam draft eligibility. On April 29, 2010, Theodore was drafted in the third round of the 2010 WHL Bantam Draft, by the Seattle Thunderbirds in the Western Hockey League (WHL). At the time of his selection, he was measured at 5 ft 10 in (178 cm) and 142 lb (64 kg). By the time he graduated from minor hockey, Theodore established himself as the most outstanding player in the team's franchise history. Theodore and his family gave credit for his impact to coaches Steve Howerton, Dan Armstrong, Kris Armstrong, Steve Potomak, and Tim Preston, Theodore's trainer for 10 years. He played four games with the Thunderbirds but spent the majority of the 2010–11 season with the Fraser Valley Bruins in the British Columbia midget major league. He was also selected to compete with Team BC at the 2011 Canada Winter Games.

Prior to the 2011–12 season, Theodore partook in the Seattle Thunderbirds rookie camp. After making the final roster, Theodore recorded 35 points in 69 games during his first full season. He recorded his first career major junior goal in a 6–3 win over the Portland Winterhawks on November 19, 2011. As the 2013 NHL entry draft approached, Theodore was rated as a top prospect by various scouts. Midway through the 2012–13 season, Theodore was ranked 17th amongst North American skaters by the NHL Central Scouting Bureau and was eventually drafted in the first round of the 2013 NHL Entry Draft by the Anaheim Ducks. He signed a three-year, entry-level contract with the team on September 24, 2013. Theodore continued his high scoring pace during the 2013–14 WHL season, where he led all WHL defencemen in scoring and was selected for the Western Conference 1st Team All-Star team. He was assigned to the Ducks American Hockey League (AHL) affiliate, the Norfolk Admirals, on April 10, 2014 but recorded no points in four games.

After attending the Ducks training camp, Theodore was reassigned to the WHL for the 2014–15 season. Following a mid-season injury to captain Justin Hickman, Theodore was selected to wear the "C" for the remainder of the year. In his final season of junior hockey, Theodore served an assistant captain and was awarded the Bill Hunter Memorial Trophy as WHL defenceman of the year. He joined the Ducks AHL affiliate, the Norfolk Admirals, in April 2015 after recording 13 goals and 35 assists in 43 games.

=== Professional ===
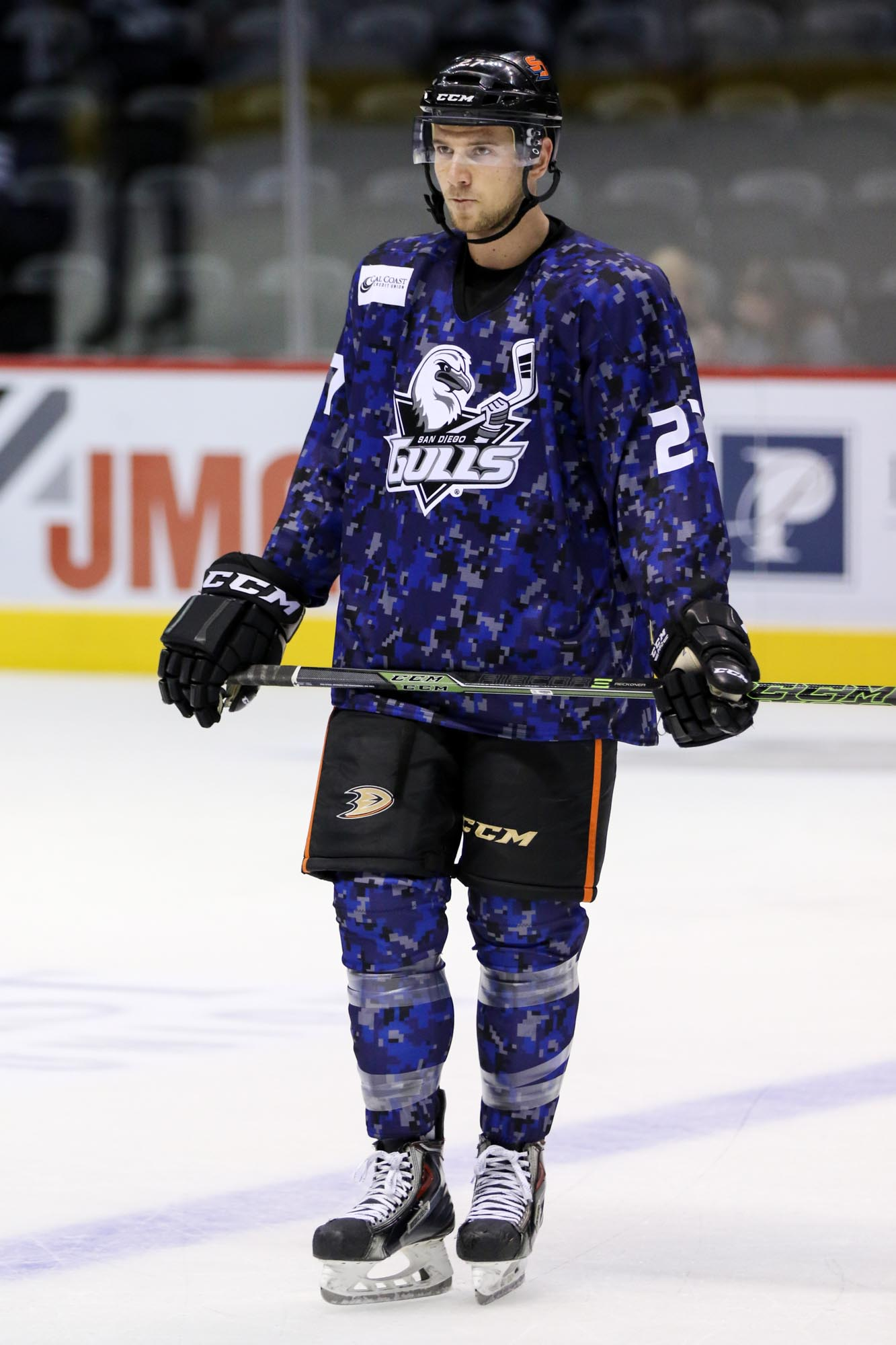
Theodore with the San Diego Gulls in 2015

Theodore was assigned to the San Diego Gulls, the Ducks inaugural AHL affiliate, to begin the 2015–16 season. He earned his first NHL call up on October 17 but was returned to the AHL without making his debut. Theodore eventually made his NHL debut on December 30, 2015, against the Calgary Flames. In the 1–0 victory which ended the Flames' home win streak, he played on a pairing with Clayton Stoner. He would later record his first career NHL goal in a game against the Ottawa Senators on January 13, 2016, and help the Ducks qualify for the 2016 Stanley Cup playoffs. During their first-round matchup against Nashville, Theodore's time on ice slowly lowered due to errors as the team eventually lost in the first round.

The following season, Theodore was once again assigned to the San Diego Gulls after participating in the Ducks training camp. He spent the remainder of the season moving between the Ducks and Gulls, an amount he estimated surpassed 15 times. He again played in the 2017 Stanley Cup playoffs, where he recorded his first postseason goal on April 17, 2017. However, his tenure with the Ducks was shortly coming to a close. On June 21, 2017, at the NHL Expansion Draft, Theodore was traded by the Ducks to the Vegas Golden Knights in order for the Ducks to keep established defenceman Josh Manson and ensure the Golden Knights selected Clayton Stoner.

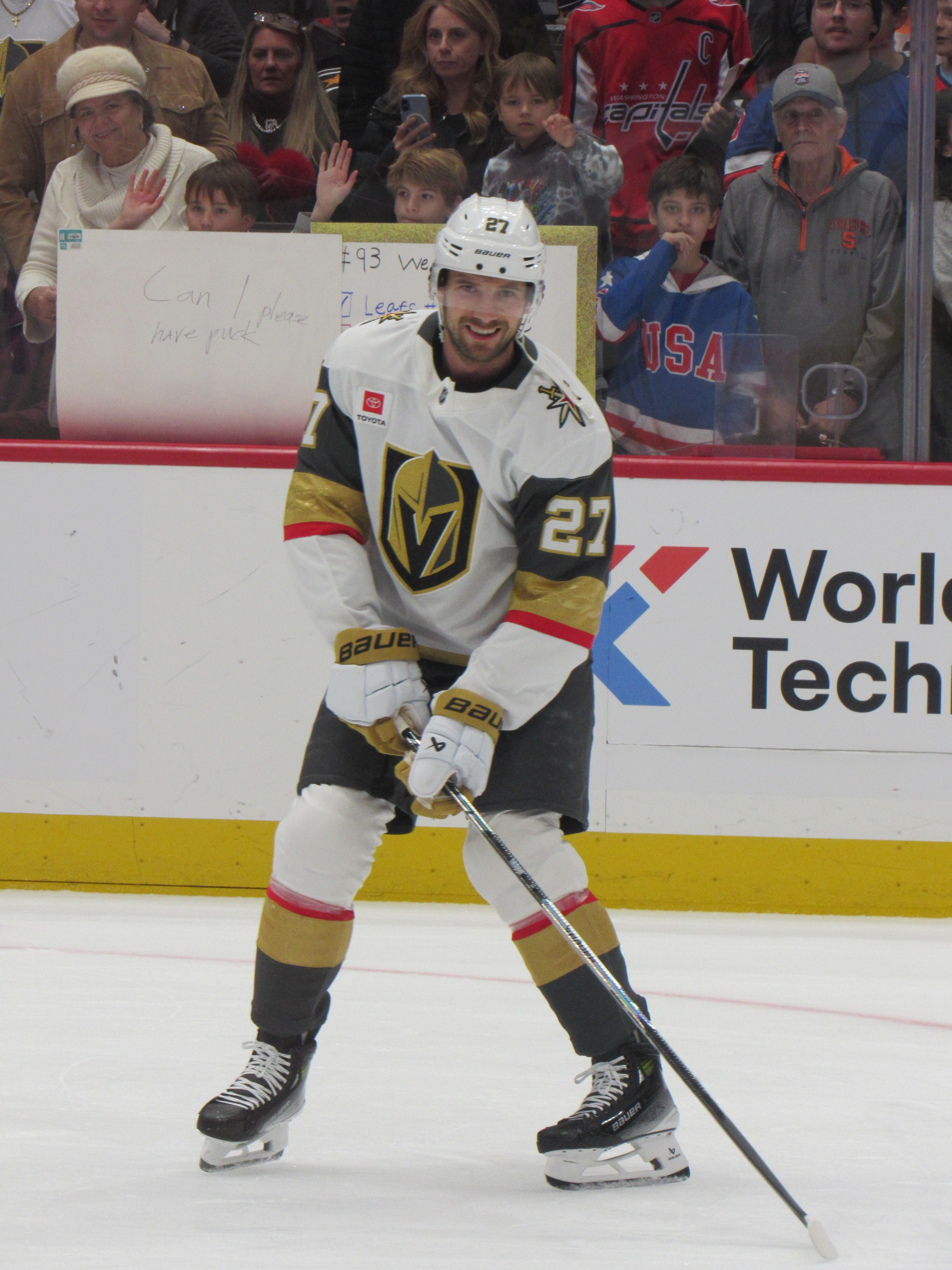
Theodore with the Golden Knights in 2026

Upon arriving, he was assigned to the Golden Knights AHL affiliate, the Chicago Wolves, to begin the 2017–18 season, but was recalled to the NHL on October 30. As he was the only waiver exempt player on the Golden Knights roster, he was consistently shuffled in between the AHL and NHL rosters. During his time with the Golden Knights in the 2018 Stanley Cup playoffs, Theodore averaged 21:37 minutes and was praised for his skating ability by teammates. Prior to the 2018–19 season, Theodore signed a seven-year, $36.4 million contract extension with the Golden Knights on September 24, 2018. At the time of the signing, he had missed nearly two weeks of training camp due to the contract dispute. One of the key features of the dispute was the length of the contract, as the team wished for a longer-term than a two-year deal. In spite of this, he recorded a career high 37 points in 79 games as the Golden Knights again qualified for the Stanley Cup playoffs. Following their elimination, Theodore trained in Vancouver with Morgan Rielly and Devon Toews.

Prior to the 2019–20 season, Theodore underwent surgery to treat his testicular cancer. Theodore's grandmother, who was also being treated for cancer, was invited to drop the ceremonial first puck during the Golden Knights Hockey Fights Cancer game on November 21, 2019.

By the 2022–23 season, Theodore was one of six remaining original members of the Golden Knights, alongside Jonathan Marchessault, William Karlsson, Reilly Smith, Brayden McNabb and William Carrier. The team reached the Stanley Cup Final for the second time, winning the Cup over the Florida Panthers in five games. Theodore and four of the other original Golden Knights started the decisive game five.

On October 24, 2024, shortly after the start of the 2024–25 season, and as a pending free agent, Theodore signed a seven-year extension with the Golden Knights, keeping him in Vegas through the 2031–32 season.

== International play ==
Medal record

Ice hockey

Representing Canada

Olympic Games
Silver medal – second place	2026 Milano Cortina	

World Championships
Silver medal – second place	2019 Slovakia	

4 Nations Face-Off
Winner	2025 Canada/United States	

World Junior Championships
Gold medal – first place	2015 Canada	

World U18 Championship
Gold medal – first place	2013 Sochi	

During the 2012–13 season, Theodore was a member of Team Canada under-18 squad when it won gold medals at both the 2012 Ivan Hlinka Memorial Tournament and the 2013 IIHF World U18 Championships. Theodore would again play for the Team Canada during the 2015 World Junior Ice Hockey Championship, where he helped them hold the Russians scoreless in the third period to win the gold medal.

On April 29, 2019, Theodore was slated to make his full international debut after he was named to the Team Canada roster for the 2019 IIHF World Championship, held in Slovakia. While undergoing preparations to compete in the tournament, he was diagnosed with testicular cancer after failing a drug test due to high hCG hormone levels. In spite of this, he helped Canada progress through to the playoff rounds before losing the final to Finland to finish with the silver medal. Theodore completed the tournament posting 2 goals and 7 points in 10 games from the blueline.

On December 31, 2025, he was named to Canada's roster to compete at the 2026 Winter Olympics.

== Personal life ==
Theodore was born on August 3, 1995, to millwright Cam and bankworker Corrine Theodore. His older sister Alyssa also played ice hockey in women's and men's leagues while attending the University of the Fraser Valley for her Bachelor of Arts degree.

== Career statistics ==
=== Regular season and playoffs ===
			Regular season					Playoffs
Season	Team	League	GP	G	A	Pts	PIM	GP	G	A	Pts	PIM
2010–11	Seattle Thunderbirds	WHL	4	0	0	0	2	—	—	—	—	—
2011–12	Seattle Thunderbirds	WHL	69	4	31	35	30	—	—	—	—	—
2012–13	Seattle Thunderbirds	WHL	71	19	31	50	32	7	0	2	2	4
2013–14	Seattle Thunderbirds	WHL	70	22	57	79	39	9	0	5	5	4
2013–14	Norfolk Admirals	AHL	4	0	0	0	0	4	1	2	3	2
2014–15	Seattle Thunderbirds	WHL	43	13	35	48	16	6	3	6	9	0
2014–15	Norfolk Admirals	AHL	8	4	5	9	0	—	—	—	—	—
2015–16	San Diego Gulls	AHL	50	9	28	37	34	7	2	3	5	4
2015–16	Anaheim Ducks	NHL	19	3	5	8	2	6	0	0	0	0
2016–17	San Diego Gulls	AHL	26	5	15	20	12	—	—	—	—	—
2016–17	Anaheim Ducks	NHL	34	2	7	9	28	14	2	6	8	4
2017–18	Chicago Wolves	AHL	8	5	6	11	2	—	—	—	—	—
2017–18	Vegas Golden Knights	NHL	61	6	23	29	14	20	3	7	10	8
2018–19	Vegas Golden Knights	NHL	79	12	25	37	20	7	1	7	8	6
2019–20	Vegas Golden Knights	NHL	71	13	33	46	25	20	7	11	18	8
2020–21	Vegas Golden Knights	NHL	53	8	34	42	14	19	1	9	10	10
2021–22	Vegas Golden Knights	NHL	78	14	38	52	24	—	—	—	—	—
2022–23	Vegas Golden Knights	NHL	55	8	33	41	18	21	1	12	13	10
2023–24	Vegas Golden Knights	NHL	47	5	37	42	6	7	0	0	0	0
2024–25	Vegas Golden Knights	NHL	67	7	50	57	26	11	2	3	5	0
2025–26	Vegas Golden Knights	NHL	70	10	29	39	24	22	6	12	18	10
NHL totals			634	88	314	402	201	147	23	68	91	56

=== International ===
Year	Team	Event	Result	GP	G	A	Pts	PIM
2012	Canada	IH18	1st place, gold medalist(s)	5	0	0	0	2
2013	Canada	U18	1st place, gold medalist(s)	7	0	5	5	0
2015	Canada	WJC	1st place, gold medalist(s)	7	1	1	2	0
2019	Canada	WC	2nd place, silver medalist(s)	10	2	5	7	4
2025	Canada	4NF	1st place, gold medalist(s)	1	0	0	0	0
2026	Canada	OG	2nd place, silver medalist(s)	6	1	1	2	4
Junior totals				19	1	6	7	2
Senior totals				17	3	6	9	6

== Awards and honours ==
Award	Year	Ref
WHL
WHL (West) First All-Star Team	2014	
Bill Hunter Memorial Trophy	2015	
NHL
Stanley Cup champion	2023	

Awards and achievements
Preceded by Hampus Lindholm	Anaheim Ducks first-round draft pick 2013	Succeeded by Nick Ritchie
