= Tukvar Tea Garden =

Tukvar Valley
- Valley
- Tukvar Valley
- Nickname: The Valley of Flowers and Fruits
- Location in West Bengal, India Tukvar Valley (India)
- Coordinates: 27.0962°N 88.2575°E
- Country: India
- State: West Bengal
- District: Darjeeling
- Founder: Britishers
- Sabhasad: Lalkothi

Government
  - Type: Democracy
  - Body: Gorkhaland Territorial Administration

Population (2011)
  - Total: 6,982
- Demonym: Tukvarey
- Time zone: UTC+5:30 (IST)
- PIN: 734 104
- Vehicle registration: WB76
- Lok Sabha constituency: Darjeeling
- Vidhan Sabha constituency: Darjeeling
- Website: darjeeling.gov.in

Tukvar Valley is a valley in the Darjeeling Pulbazar CD block in the Darjeeling Sadar subdivision of the Darjeeling district in the state of West Bengal, India.

Tukvar Tea Garden in Tukvar Valley is composed mainly of many divisions, 1st Division, 2nd Division (Limbu Busty), 3rd Division-Lepcha Busty, 4th Division and Puttabong. The valley as a whole comprises Singamari, Puttabong, Soom T.E, Tukvar Tea Estate, Singla Tea Estate.

The Darjeeling-Jorethang road is the prime route of this valley, which connects Darjeeling with Sikkim. In early days it was used by the traders from Sikkim to reach Darjeeling's Gundri Bazar.

The very famous Conveyor ropeway is also lies in this place, which once were called the Asia's longest ropeway.

== Geography ==
Places and tea estates in the north-western portion of Darjeeling Sadar subdivision (including Darjeeling Pulbazar CD block) in Darjeeling district
CT: census town, R: rural/ urban centre, N: neighbourhood, H: hill centre, NP: national park/ wildlife sanctuary, TE: tea estate, TA: tourist attraction
Abbreviations used in names – TG for Tea Garden (town/village), TE for Tea Estate
Owing to space constraints in the small map, the actual locations in a larger map may vary slightly

=== Location ===
Tukvar Tea Garden is located at 27.0962°N 88.2575°E.

=== Area overview ===
The map alongside shows the northern portion of the Darjeeling Himalayan hill region. Kangchenjunga, which rises with an elevation of 8,586 metres (28,169 ft) is located further north of the area shown. Sandakphu, rising to a height of 3,665 metres (12,024 ft), on the Singalila Ridge, is the highest point in West Bengal. In Darjeeling Sadar subdivision 61% of the total population lives in the rural areas and 39% of the population lives in the urban areas. There are 78 tea gardens/ estates (the figure varies slightly according to different sources), producing and largely exporting Darjeeling tea in the district. It engages a large proportion of the population directly/ indirectly. Some tea gardens were identified in the 2011 census as census towns or villages. Such places are marked in the map as CT (census town) or R (rural/ urban centre). Specific tea estate pages are marked TE.

Note: The map alongside presents some of the notable locations in the subdivision. All places marked in the map are linked in the larger full screen map.

== Demographics ==
According to the 2011 Census of India, Tukvar Tea Garden had a total population of 4,791 of which 2,339 (49%) were male and 2,452 (51%) were female. There were 397 persons in the age range of zero to six years. The number of literate people in Tukvar Tea Garden was 3,529 (73.66% of the population over six years).

== Tea estates ==
The management of Tukvar Tea Estate had issued an order for "suspension of work" after some workers had allegedly tried to beat up a manager. As of 2016, it remained closed.

North Tukvar Tea Estate is one of the oldest tea gardens in Darjeeling. It started commercial production in 1856.

Puttabong Tea Estate was formerly known as Tukvar Tea Estate.

Vah Tukvar, an old and historical tea garden, fell on bad days and effectively closed down around 1995, although no formal announcement about its closure was made. The Chamong group acquired the abandoned Vah Tukvar, renamed it Shree Dwarika, and reopened its gates in 2006.

== Darjeeling Ropeway ==
Darjeeling Ropeway was started in 1968 from Singamari in Darjeeling. In 45 minutes, the ropeway transported passengers from a height of 7,000 ft down to 800 feet where the last station was located at Singla Bazar on the bank of the Rangeet. As of 2020, the ropeway runs only up to Tukvar.
