= Nagri Farm Tea Garden =

- Village
- Location in West Bengal, India Nagri Farm Tea Garden (India)
- Coordinates: 26.9135°N 88.2092°E
- Country: India
- State: West Bengal
- District: Darjeeling

Population (2011)
  - Total: 3,098
- Time zone: UTC+5:30 (IST)
- Lok Sabha constituency: Darjeeling
- Vidhan Sabha constituency: Kurseong
- Website: darjeeling.gov.in

Nagri Farm Tea Garden is a village in the Jorebunglow Sukhiapokhri CD block in the Darjeeling Sadar subdivision of the Darjeeling district in the state of West Bengal, India.

== History ==
Nagri Farm was initially established as a dairy farm in 1857 by a British entrepreneur, Greenhill. However, the owner changed course and by 1883, it had been fully developed as a tea garden, but the ‘farm’ suffix remained intact. Greenhill, even built a tea factory and appointed a British manager. Later, Greenhill sold the property to Williamson Magor and Company, who formally established the Nagri Farm Tea Company Limited. The wooden structure of the tea factory was gutted in successive fires in 1912 and 1962. It was then rebuilt with its current cement structure. In 2001, the Chamong Group, purchased Nagri Farm Tea Estate. Interestingly, even now, it produces ginger, cardamom, oranges and other agricultural products, in addition to its China and Assam hybrid teas.

== Geography ==
Places and tea estates in the southern portion of Darjeeling Sadar subdivision (including Jorebunglow Sukhiapokhri CD block), and Mirik Subdivision in Darjeeling district
CT: census town, R: rural/ urban centre, NP: national park/ wildlife sanctuary, TE: tea estate
Abbreviations used in names – TG for Tea Garden (town/village), TE for Tea Estate
Owing to space constraints in the small map, the actual locations in a larger map may vary slightly

=== Location ===
Nagri Farm Tea Garden is located at 26.9135°N 88.2092°E.

Nagri Farm Tea Garden sprawls over an area of 256 hectares (630 acres) of tea plantations, out of a total area of 571.37 hectares (1,411.9 acres), in the Rong Bong valley. The gentle slopes of the tea garden range in height from 2,500 to 6,400 feet (760 to 1,950 m).

Other tea gardens in the area are: Dhajea, Balasun, Thurbo, Gopaldhara, Avongrove and Soureni.

=== Area overview ===
The map alongside shows a part of the southern portion of the Darjeeling Himalayan hill region in the Darjeeling district. In the Darjeeling Sadar subdivision 61.00% of the total population lives in the rural areas and 39.00% of the population lives in the urban areas. In the Mirik subdivision 80.11% of the total population lives in the rural areas and 19.89% lives in the urban areas. There are 78 tea gardens/ estates (the figure varies slightly according to different sources), in the district, producing and largely exporting Darjeeling tea. It engages a large proportion of the population directly/ indirectly. Some tea gardens were identified in the 2011 census as census towns or villages. Such places are marked in the map as CT (census town) or R (rural/ urban centre). Specific tea estate pages are marked TE.

Note: The map alongside presents some of the notable locations in the subdivision. All places marked in the map are linked in the larger full screen map.

== Demographics ==
According to the 2011 Census of India, Nagri Farm Tea Garden had a total population of 3.655 of which 1,856 (51%) were males and 1,799 (49%) were females. There were 278 persons in the age range of 0 to 6 years. The total number of literate people in Nagri Farm Tea Garden was 2,795 (76.47% of the population over 6 years).

== Economy ==
On taking over the Nagri Farm Tea Garden, one of the first steps taken by the Chamong Group was to make it an organic tea estate. The Nagri Farm Tea Garden acquired its 100% bio-organic tea garden certification in 2004. It acquired its fair-trade certification in 2009. The Chamong Group upgraded the tea factory with modern machinery capable of higher production. The annual production of Nagri Farm Tea Garden is 200 million tonnes.

=== Chamong Group ===
The Chamong Group is the largest producer of organic Darjeeling tea and Assam tea. It produces 3,000 tonnes annually and employs 10,000 persons (including 7,000 women). It owns 4 tea estates in Assam and 13 in Darjeeling. The tea estates in Darjeeling are: Pussimbing, Chamong, Tumsong, Lingia, Nagri Farm, Bannockburn, Dhajea, Shree Dwarika, Ging, Soom, Phoobsering, Tukdah and Marybong. It exports tea to the US, Europe, Japan and the Middle East.
