= Dhajea Tea Garden =

- Village
- Location in West Bengal, India Dhajea Tea Garden (India)
- Coordinates: 26.9265°N 88.2192°E
- Country: India
- State: West Bengal
- District: Darjeeling

Population (2011)
  - Total: 1,394
- Time zone: UTC+5:30 (IST)
- Lok Sabha constituency: Darjeeling
- Vidhan Sabha constituency: Kurseong
- Website: darjeeling.gov.in

Dhajea Tea Garden is a village in the Jorebunglow Sukhiapokhri CD block in the Darjeeling Sadar subdivision of the Darjeeling district in the state of West Bengal, India.

== Etymology ==
The Lepchas once dominated the Darjeeling area. They were Buddhists. They hoist 108 flags during their special prayers. They believe that the flags carry their prayers to heaven and as the colours of the flags get washed away by weathering, their sins also get washed away. In the Lepcha language ‘Dhaja’ means flag and ‘Dhajea’ is a place of flags

== History ==
Dhajea Tea Garden was planted in 1870 as a division of the Moondakotee Tea Garden and the green tea leaves were transported to the Moondakotee factory over a ropeway. In the process leaves were often damaged. In 1995, a factory was constructed at Dhajea.

Dhajea Tea Garden is owned by the Lohias of the Chamong Group. Some of the other Darjeeling gardens of the Chamong Group are: Pussimbing, Tumsong, Lingla, Soom, Nagri Farm, Mariabong, Chamong, Phoobsering, Bannockburn, Takdah, Ging and Shri Dwarika.

== Geography ==
Places and tea estates in the southern portion of Darjeeling Sadar subdivision (including Jorebunglow Sukhiapokhri CD block), and Mirik Subdivision in Darjeeling district
CT: census town, R: rural/ urban centre, NP: national park/ wildlife sanctuary, TE: tea estate
Abbreviations used in names – TG for Tea Garden (town/village), TE for Tea Estate
Owing to space constraints in the small map, the actual locations in a larger map may vary slightly

=== Location ===
Dhajea Tea Garden is located at 26.9265°N 88.2192°E. Dhajea Tea Estate is in the Rongbong valley above the banks of the Balason. It produces 100% organic Darjeeling tea from 2007, in an area of 180 hectares (440 acres) out of a total area of 317 hectares (780 acres) at an altitude ranging from 2,600 to 3,500 feet (790 to 1,070 m).

Dhajea Tea Estate is surrounded by several high-yielding Darjeeling tea estates: Avongrove, Dooteria, Balasun, Ambootia, Nagri Farm and Moondakotee.

=== Area overview ===
The map alongside shows a part of the southern portion of the Darjeeling Himalayan hill region in the Darjeeling district. In the Darjeeling Sadar subdivision 61.00% of the total population lives in the rural areas and 39.00% of the population lives in the urban areas. In the Mirik subdivision 80.11% of the total population lives in the rural areas and 19.89% lives in the urban areas. There are 78 tea gardens/ estates (the figure varies slightly according to different sources), in the district, producing and largely exporting Darjeeling tea. It engages a large proportion of the population directly/ indirectly. Some tea gardens were identified in the 2011 census as census towns or villages. Such places are marked in the map as CT (census town) or R (rural/ urban centre). Specific tea estate pages are marked TE.

Note: The map alongside presents some of the notable locations in the subdivision. All places marked in the map are linked in the larger full screen map.

== Demographics ==
According to the 2011 Census of India, Dhajea Tea Garden had a total population of 1,394 of which 706 (51%) were males and 688 (49%) were females. There were 137 persons in the age range of 0 to 6 years. The total number of literate people in Dhajea was 893 (64.06% of the population over 6 years).

== Economy ==
Dhajea Tea Garden produces 95 million tonnes of tea annually. It employs 500 workers.

=== Chamong Group ===
The Chamong Group is the largest producer of organic Darjeeling tea and Assam tea. It produces 3,000 tonnes annually and employs 10,000 persons (including 7,000 women). It owns 4 tea estates in Assam and 13 in Darjeeling. The tea estates in Darjeeling are: Pussimbing, Chamong, Tumsong, Lingia, Nagri Farm, Bannockburn, Dhajea, Shree Dwarika, Ging, Soom, Phoobsering, Tukdah and Marybong. It exports tea to the US, Europe, Japan and the Middle East.

== Education ==
The Chamong Group has organised 4 primary schools and a high school in the area.

== Healthcare ==
Dhajea Tea Garden has a dispensary.
