= Soom Tea Garden =

- Village
- Location in West Bengal, India Soom Tea Garden (India)
- Coordinates: 27.0762°N 88.2315°E
- Country: India
- State: West Bengal
- District: Darjeeling

Population (2011)
  - Total: 3,578
- Time zone: UTC+5:30 (IST)
- PIN: 734 104
- Lok Sabha constituency: Darjeeling
- Vidhan Sabha constituency: Darjeeling
- Website: darjeeling.gov.in

Soom Tea Garden is a village in the Darjeeling Pulbazar CD block in the Darjeeling Sadar subdivision of the Darjeeling district in the state of West Bengal, India.

== Etymology ==
Soom is a Lepcha word meaning triangle. The tea garden is triangular in shape.

== History ==
Soom Tea Garden was planted by J.Jerdin in 1860. Williamson Magor and Company owned the garden for a century. The Chamong Group took control of Soom Tea Garden, then in bad shape, in 2001.

== Geography ==
Places and tea estates in the north-western portion of Darjeeling Sadar subdivision (including Darjeeling Pulbazar CD block) in Darjeeling district
CT: census town, R: rural/ urban centre, N: neighbourhood, H: hill centre, NP: national park/ wildlife sanctuary, TE: tea estate, TA: tourist attraction
Abbreviations used in names – TG for Tea Garden (town/village), TE for Tea Estate
Owing to space constraints in the small map, the actual locations in a larger map may vary slightly

=== Location ===
Soom Tea Garden is located at 27.0762°N 88.2315°E.

Soom Tea Garden is located 18 km from Darjeeling. It is bounded by North Tukvar Tea Estate in the north, Phoobsering Tea Estate in the east and Singtam Tea Garden in the south.

The planted area of the tea garden is 237 hectares (590 acres) at a height of 5,300 feet (1,600 m).

=== Area overview ===
The map alongside shows the northern portion of the Darjeeling Himalayan hill region. Kangchenjunga, which rises with an elevation of 8,586 metres (28,169 ft) is located further north of the area shown. Sandakphu, rising to a height of 3,665 metres (12,024 ft), on the Singalila Ridge, is the highest point in West Bengal. In Darjeeling Sadar subdivision 61% of the total population lives in the rural areas and 39% of the population lives in the urban areas. There are 78 tea gardens/ estates (the figure varies slightly according to different sources), producing and largely exporting Darjeeling tea in the district. It engages a large proportion of the population directly/ indirectly. Some tea gardens were identified in the 2011 census as census towns or villages. Such places are marked in the map as CT (census town) or R (rural/ urban centre). Specific tea estate pages are marked TE.

Note: The map alongside presents some of the notable locations in the subdivision. All places marked in the map are linked in the larger full screen map.

== Demographics ==
According to the 2011 Census of India, Soom Tea Garden had a total population of 3,578 of which 1,757 (49%) were males and 1,821 (51%) were females. There were 290 persons in the age range of 0 to 6 years. The total number of literate people in Soom Tea Garden was 2,458 (68.70% of the population over 6 years).

Most of the residents are either Nepalese, like the Chettri, Brahman, Mukhia or from the Tibetan Buddhist tribes like the Rai, Limboo, Lepcha and Tamang.

== Economy ==
Darjeeling tea from this garden mostly from Chinary cultivar and almost the entire production is exported to Europe. Soom Tea Garden is in the process of becoming fully bio-organic. It employs 692 permanent workers. The Chamong Group provides 500 houses. Many amongst the others are indirectly dependent on the tea garden.

=== Chamong Group ===
The Chamong Group is the largest producer of organic Darjeeling tea and Assam tea. It produces 3,000 tonnes annually and employs 10,000 persons (including 7,000 women). It owns 4 tea estates in Assam and 13 in Darjeeling. The tea estates in Darjeeling are: Pussimbing, Chamong, Tumsong, Lingia, Nagri Farm, Bannockburn, Dhajea, Shree Dwarika, Ging, Soom, Phoobsering, Tukdah and Marybong. It exports tea to the US, Europe, Japan and the Middle East.

== Education ==
Soom has 3 local language primary schools and 1 English-medium primary school. There is a high school 2 km away.

== Healthcare ==
The Chamong Group runs an 8-bed hospital with a visiting doctor and trained medical staff.
