= Ging Tea Garden =

- Census Town
- Location in West Bengal, India Ging Tea Garden (India)
- Coordinates: 27.0761°N 88.2996°E
- Country: India
- State: West Bengal
- District: Darjeeling

Area
  - Total: 7.4908 km^{2} (2.8922 sq mi)

Population (2011)
  - Total: 4,089
  - Density: 545.9/km^{2} (1,414/sq mi)
- Time zone: UTC+5:30 (IST)
- PIN: 734105
- Telephone/STD code: 0354
- Lok Sabha constituency: Darjeeling
- Vidhan Sabha constituency: Darjeeling
- Website: darjeeling.gov.in

Ging Tea Garden is a census town in the Darjeeling Pulbazar CD block in the Darjeeling Sadar subdivision of the Darjeeling district in the state of West Bengal, India.

== Geography ==
Places and tea estates in the north-western portion of Darjeeling Sadar subdivision (including Darjeeling Pulbazar CD block) in Darjeeling district
CT: census town, R: rural/ urban centre, N: neighbourhood, H: hill centre, NP: national park/ wildlife sanctuary, TE: tea estate, TA: tourist attraction
Abbreviations used in names – TG for Tea Garden (town/village), TE for Tea Estate
Owing to space constraints in the small map, the actual locations in a larger map may vary slightly

=== Location ===
Ging Tea Garden is located at 27.0761°N 88.2996°E.

Ging Tea Estate is located in the Lebong Valley, around 10 km north-east of Darjeeling.

=== Area overview ===
The map alongside shows the northern portion of the Darjeeling Himalayan hill region. Kangchenjunga, which rises with an elevation of 8,586 metres (28,169 ft) is located further north of the area shown.Sandakphu, rising to a height of 3,665 metres (12,024 ft), on the Singalila Ridge, is the highest point in West Bengal. In Darjeeling Sadar subdivision 61% of the total population lives in the rural areas and 39% of the population lives in the urban areas. There are 78 tea gardens/ estates (the figure varies slightly according to different sources), producing and largely exporting Darjeeling tea in the district. It engages a large proportion of the population directly/ indirectly. Some tea gardens were identified in the 2011 census as census towns or villages. Such places are marked in the map as CT (census town) or R (rural/ urban centre). Specific tea estate pages are marked TE.

Note: The map alongside presents some of the notable locations in the subdivision. All places marked in the map are linked in the larger full screen map.

== Demographics ==
According to the 2011 Census of India, Ging Tea Garden had a total population of 4,089 of which 2,037 (50%) were males and 2,037 (50%) were females. There were 345 persons in the age range of 0 to 6 years. The total number of literate people in Ging Tea Garden was 3,086 (75.47% of the population over 6 years).

== Infrastructure ==
According to the District Census Handbook 2011, Darjiling, Ging Tea Garden covered an area of 7.4908 km^{2}. Among the civic amenities, it had 16 km roads with open drains, the protected water supply involved overhead tank, spring and tap water from untreated sources. It had 879 domestic electric connections. Among the medical facilities it had 1 dispensary/ health centre. Among the educational facilities it had were 6 primary schools, the nearest middle, secondary and senior secondary school at Ging bustee 3 km away. It had 5 non-formal education centres (Sarba Siksha Abhiyan). Among the social, cultural and recreational facilities, it had 1 public library. An important commodity it manufactured was tea.

== Ging Tea Estate ==
Ging Tea Estate, managed by the Chamong Group, produces premium Darjeeling Tea. It is organically certified. The estate is spread over an area of 250 ha (620 acres) from a height of 650 to 1,500 m (2,130 to 4,920 ft).

=== Chamong Group ===
The Chamong Group is the largest producer of organic Darjeeling tea and Assam tea. It produces 3,000 tonnes annually and employs 10,000 persons (including 7,000 women). It owns 4 tea estates in Assam and 13 in Darjeeling. The tea estates in Darjeeling are: Pussimbing, Chamong, Tumsong, Lingia, Nagri Farm, Bannockburn, Dhajea, Shree Dwarika, Ging, Soom, Phoobsering, Tukdah and Marybong. It exports tea to the US, Europe, Japan and the Middle East.

== Tourism ==
Ging Tea House is a heritage plantation retreat. Originally a British planter's bungalow built in 1864, now restored and renovated.

== Education ==
Siksha Sangha High School is a private coeducational higher secondary institution established in 1953 at PO Lebong.
