= Mariabong Tea Garden =

Mariabong Tea Garden Marybong Tea Garden
- Village
- Location in West Bengal, India Mariabong Tea Garden (India)
- Coordinates: 27.0442°N 88.1938°E
- Country: India
- State: West Bengal
- District: Darjeeling

Population (2011)
  - Total: 2,404
- Time zone: UTC+5:30 (IST)
- PIN: 734102
- Lok Sabha constituency: Darjeeling
- Vidhan Sabha constituency: Darjeeling
- Website: darjeeling.gov.in

Mariabong Tea Garden (also called Marybong) is a village in the Jorebunglow Sukhiapokhri CD block in the Darjeeling Sadar subdivision of the Darjeeling district in the state of West Bengal, India. It is a part of Lingia Mariabong gram panchayat.

== History ==
This tea garden used to be a part of the Lingia Tea Estate, now an adjoining place. It was added to the Kyel Tea Estate, as a wedding gift for Mary, daughter of the owners of Lingia Tea Estate. The merged estate was renamed Marybong. In the local Lepcha language it means Mary's place.

The tea estate was established by Louis Mandelli in 1876. The Evandon family owned and managed it from 1880 to 1955. Thereafter, it was with Duncan Brothers for half a century. In 2006, the Chamong Group of the Lohias, acquired the ailing garden and restored it to its past magical and mystical glory.

== Geography ==
Places and tea estates in the southern portion of Darjeeling Sadar subdivision (including Jorebunglow Sukhiapokhri CD block), and Mirik Subdivision in Darjeeling district
CT: census town, R: rural/ urban centre, NP: national park/ wildlife sanctuary, TE: tea estate
Abbreviations used in names – TG for Tea Garden (town/village), TE for Tea Estate
Owing to space constraints in the small map, the actual locations in a larger map may vary slightly

=== Location ===
Mariabong Tea Garden is located at 27.0442°N 88.1938°E.

Marybong Tea Garden is located in the Golden Valley of Darjeeling at an altitude ranging from 3,000 to 6,000 feet (910 to 1,830 m) and covering 285 hectares (700 acres) of planted area, out of a total area of around 400 hectares (990 acres). Marybong is blessed "with unparalleled views of the entire Kanchenjunga range". It is 12 km from Ghum railway station.

=== Area overview ===
The map alongside shows a part of the southern portion of the Darjeeling Himalayan hill region in the Darjeeling district. In the Darjeeling Sadar subdivision 61.00% of the total population lives in the rural areas and 39.00% of the population lives in the urban areas. In the Mirik subdivision 80.11% of the total population lives in the rural areas and 19.89% lives in the urban areas. There are 78 tea gardens/ estates (the figure varies slightly according to different sources), in the district, producing and largely exporting Darjeeling tea. It engages a large proportion of the population directly/ indirectly. Some tea gardens were identified in the 2011 census as census towns or villages. Such places are marked in the map as CT (census town) or R (rural/ urban centre). Specific tea estate pages are marked TE.

Note: The map alongside presents some of the notable locations in the subdivision. All places marked in the map are linked in the larger full screen map.

== Demographics ==
According to the 2011 Census of India, Mariabong Tea Garden had a total population of 2,404 of which 1,203 (50%) were males and 1,201 (50%) were females. There were 183 persons in the age range of 0 to 6 years. The total number of literate people in Mariabong Tea Garden was 1,721 (71.59% of the population over 6 years).

== Economy ==
The climatic conditions at high altitudes, assist the China plantations at Marybong to produce Darjeeling tea "with a flowery flavour that remains distinctive through all seasons". It annually produces 200,000 kg of tea.

Marybong Tea Garden employs around 700 workers.

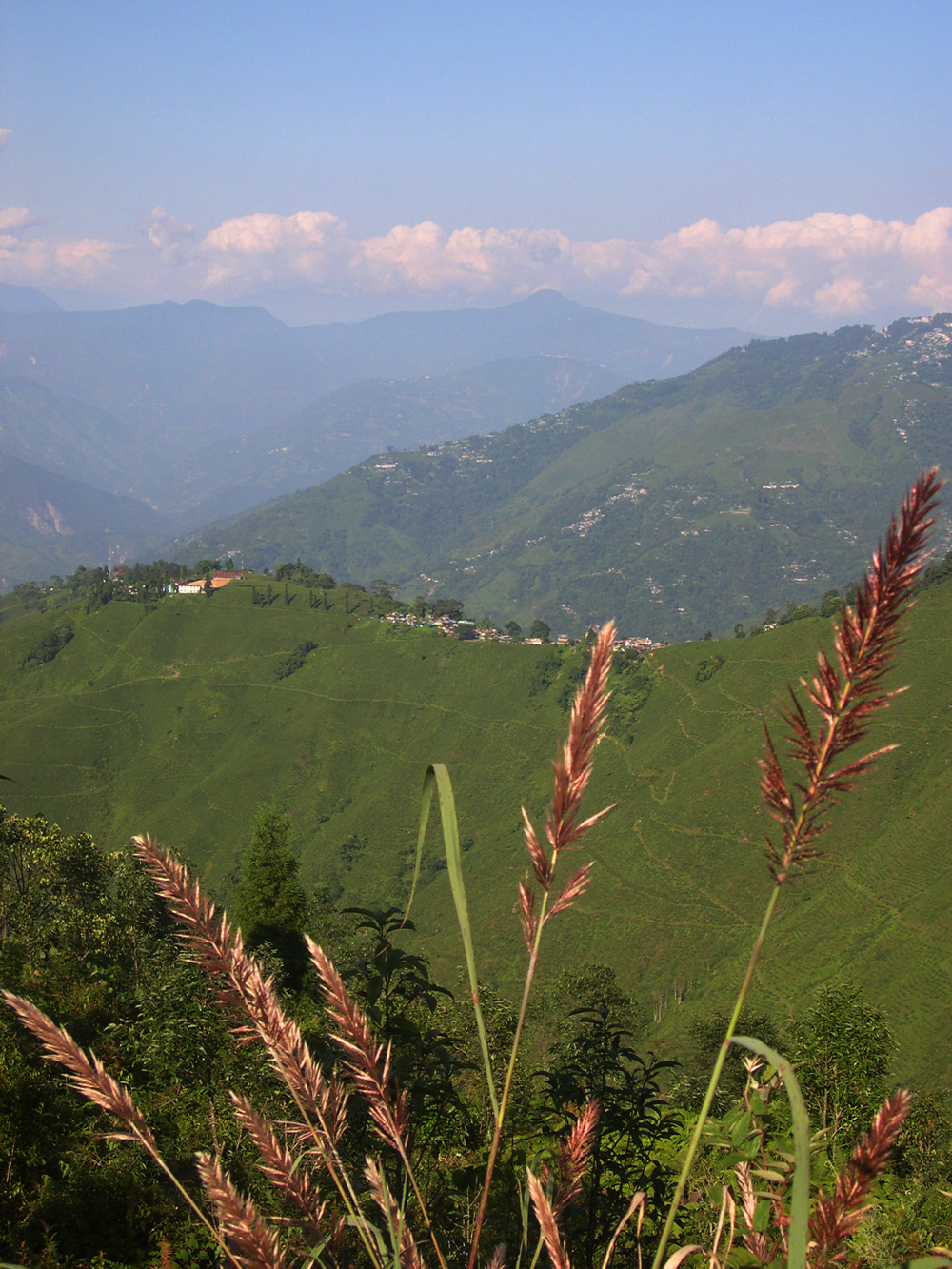
Marybong Tea Estate

=== Chamong Group ===
The Chamong Group is the largest producer of organic Darjeeling tea and Assam tea. It produces 3,000 tonnes annually and employs 10,000 persons (including 7,000 women). It owns 4 tea estates in Assam and 13 in Darjeeling. The tea estates in Darjeeling are: Pussimbing, Chamong, Tumsong, Lingia, Nagri Farm, Bannockburn, Dhajea, Shree Dwarika, Ging, Soom, Phoobsering, Tukdah and Marybong. It exports tea to the US, Europe, Japan and the Middle East.

== Education ==
Marybong Junior High School is an English-medium coeducational institution established in 1985. It has facilities for teaching from class V to class X.
