= Singhal =

Indian surname

Singhal (Hindi: सिंघल) is an Indian surname that has origins in the Sanskrit word simha or Singam, meaning leonine. Variant spellings include Singla. Among it is one of the 18 Gotra in Aggrawals, Baranwals, lineage.

Notable people with this surname include:

- Amit Singhal, former senior vice president of engineering at Uber and former head of Google Inc.'s Core Ranking Team
- Anuraag Singhal, Florida judge
- Arvind Singhal, Indian writer
- Ashok Singhal, ex–International President of the Hindu organisation Vishwa Hindu Parishad
- Bhim Singhal, Indian neurologist
- Chand Singhal, Indian politician
- Ira Singhal, Indian Bureaucrat
- Krishan Chandra Singhal, Indian pharmacologist
- Lokesh Kumar Singhal, Indian metallurgical engineer
- Manimala Singhal, Indian cricketer
- Ram Kishan Singhal, Indian politician
- Supra Singhal, Ugandan swimmer

== See also ==
- Singla
