= Transport in Darjeeling =

Transport in Darjeeling consists of the intra-city transport and the communication between the city and other locations in Darjeeling district. Darjeeling is a hill station in the Indian state of West Bengal and it is the headquarters of Darjeeling district situated in the Mahabharat Range (or Lesser Himalaya) at an average elevation of 2,134 m above sea level.

== Darjeeling Himalayan Railway ==
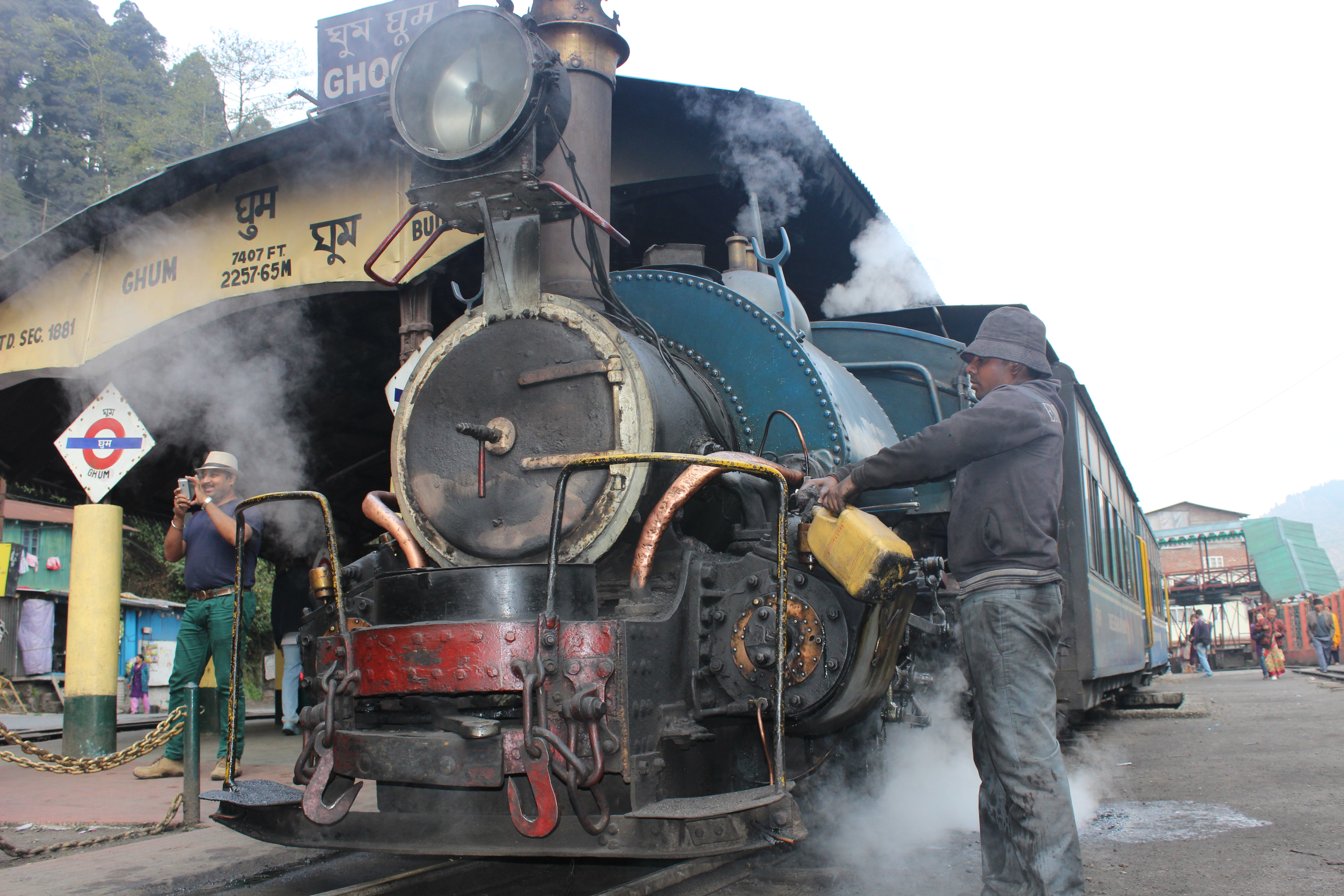
Himalayan Bird at Ghum railway station

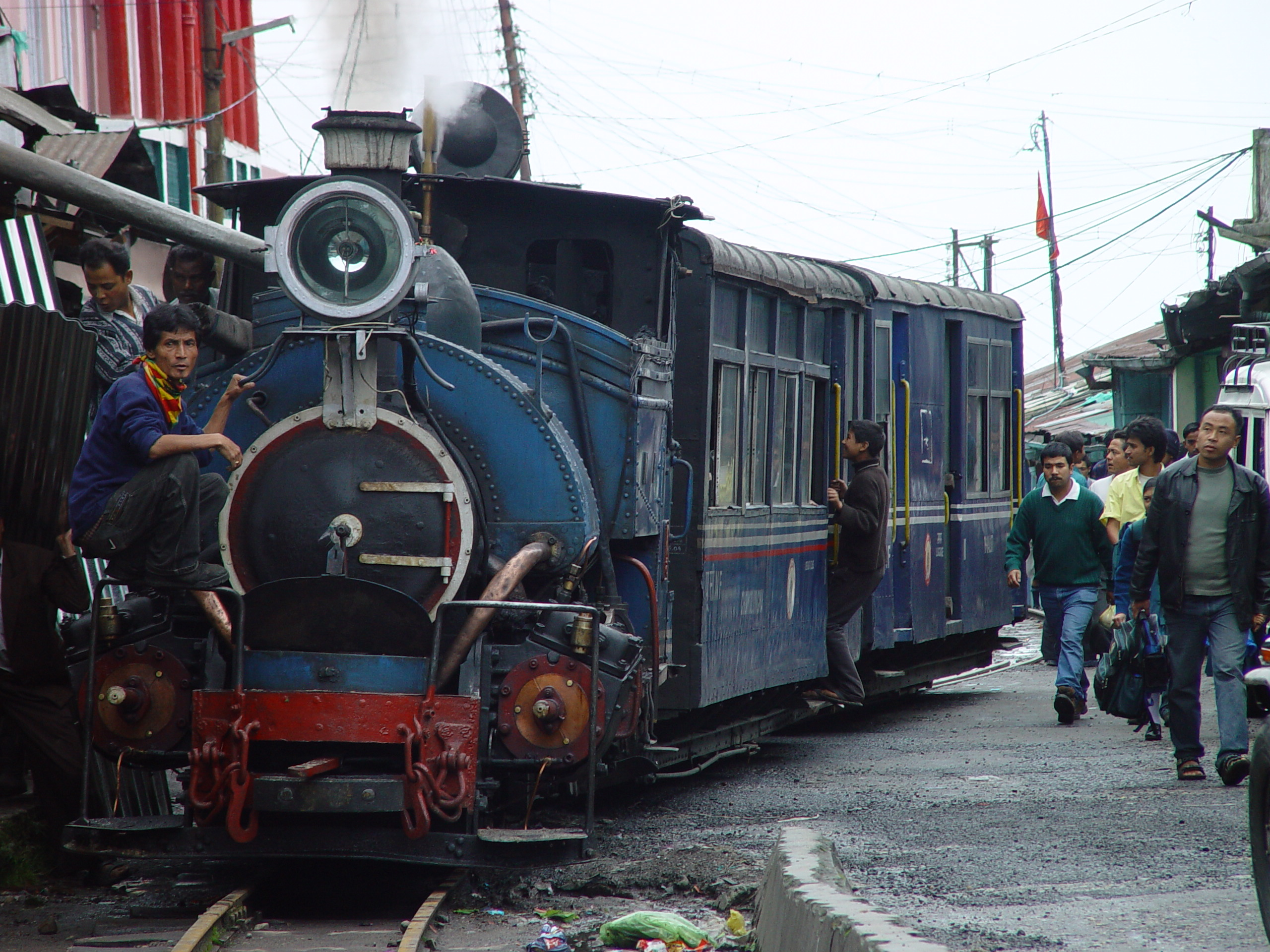
The "Toy Train" approaching Darjeeling

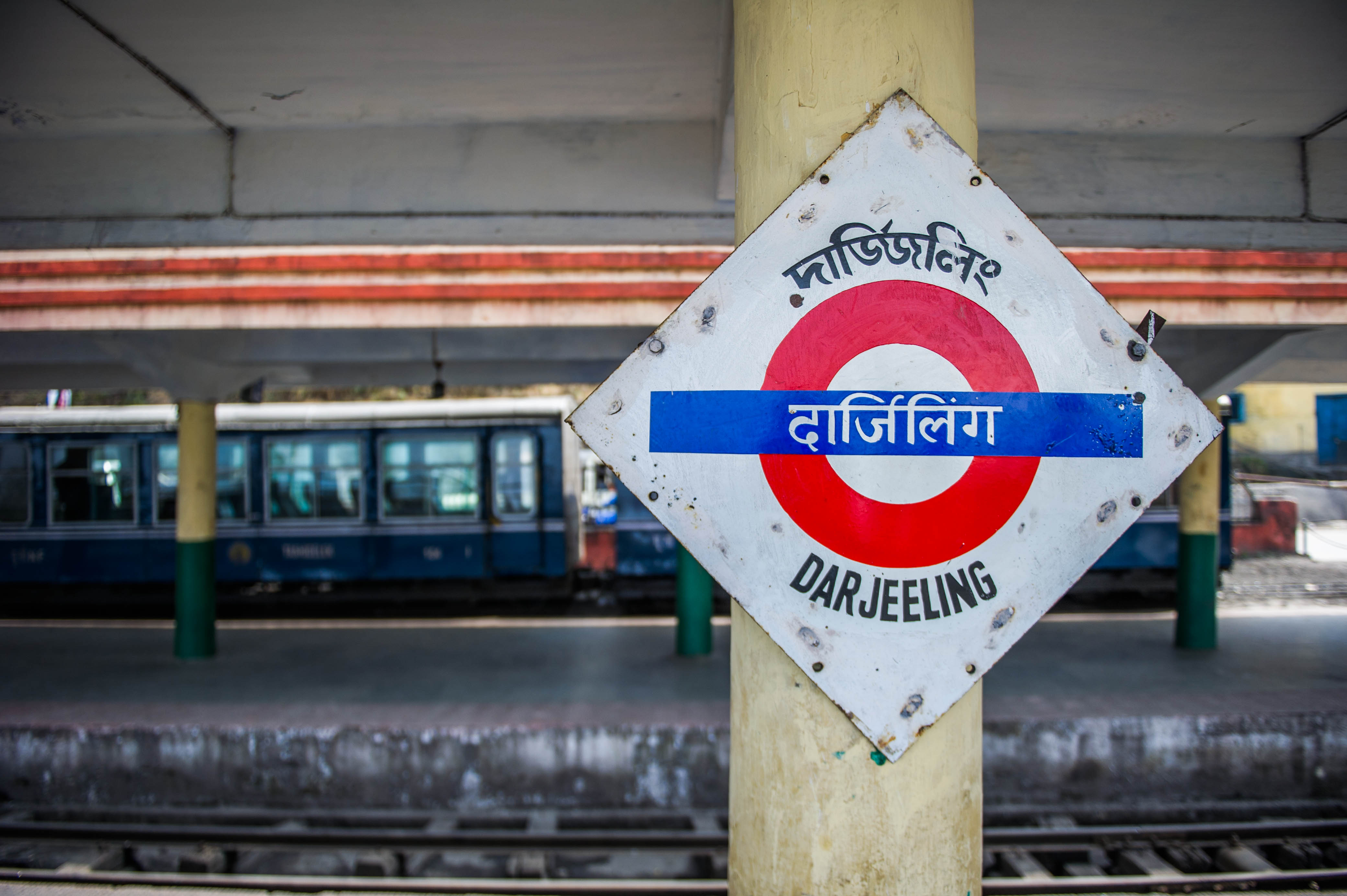
Darjeeling train station.

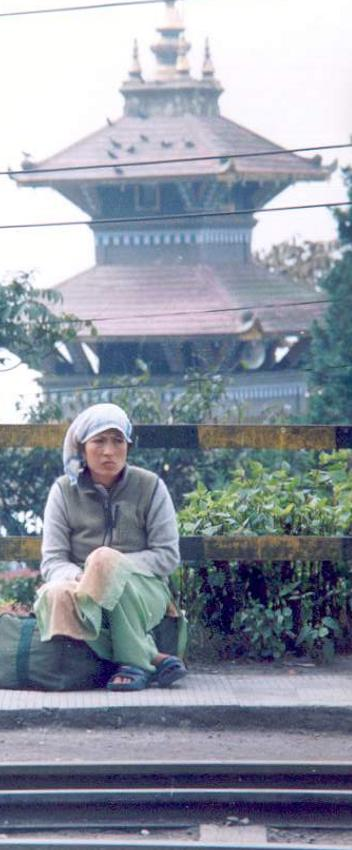
A hawker at Darjeeling train station

The town of Darjeeling can be reached by the 80-kilometre long Darjeeling Himalayan Railway, nicknamed the "Toy Train", from Siliguri. It is a 60-centimetre (2-foot) narrow-gauge railway run by the Indian Railways.

Established in 1881, the Darjeeling Himalayan Railway was declared a World Heritage Site by UNESCO in 1999, only the second railway after the Semmering Railway in Austria to have this honour. The toy train leaves from Siliguri, a station located a few kilometres from New Jalpaiguri, and takes about 8 hours to reach Darjeeling through the meandering mountain railway line. The elevation level is from about 100 m in Siliguri to about 2200 m in Darjeeling. It is to this day powered by a steam engine. A modern diesel engine is used for Darjeeling's mail. The railway has long been viewed with affection and enthusiasm by travellers to the region, and the Earl of Ronaldshay gave the following description of a journey in the early 1920s:

"Siliguri is palpably a place of meeting.[.....] The discovery that here the metre gauge system ends and the two foot gauge of the Darjeeling-Himalayan railway begins, confirms what all these things hint at.[....]One steps into a railway carriage which might easily be mistaken for a toy, and the whimsical idea seizes hold of one that one has accidentally stumbled into Lilliput. With a noisy fuss out of all proportion to its size the engine gives a jerk - and starts.[....] No special mechanical device such as a rack is employed - unless, indeed, one can so describe the squat and stolid hill-man who sits perched over the forward buffers of the engine and scatters sand on the rails when the wheels of the engine lose their grip of the metals and race, with the noise of a giant spring running down when the control has been removed. Sometimes we cross our own track after completing the circuit of a cone, at others we zigzag backwards and forwards; but always we climb at a steady gradient - so steady that if one embarks in a trolley at Ghum, the highest point on the line, the initial push supplies all the energy necessary to carry one to the bottom."

The trip up to Darjeeling on the Darjeeling Himalayan Railway has changed little since that time, and continues to delight travellers and rail enthusiasts, so much so that it has its own preservation and support group, the Darjeeling Himalayan Railway Society.

The Operation of Darjeeling Himalayan Railways between Siliguri and Kurseong was temporarily suspended following a Landslide at Tindharia between 2010 and 2015.

== Road transport ==
The Hill Cart Road (National Highway 110) connects Darjeeling with Siliguri. There is another road connecting the two towns via Mirik. There are two different shortcut routes off the Hill Cart Road that go through Pankhabari and Rohini, respectively. Four wheel drives are the most popular means of transport, as they can easily navigate the steep slopes in the region. Many vintage Land Rovers ply in the route. Also Maruti Omni and several SUVs are common. The road and toy train communication often get disrupted during the monsoons season due to landslides. Tenzing Norgay Bus Terminus in Siliguri is the most important bus terminus in the region.

== Airway ==
Darjeeling does not have an airstrip. The nearest airport is Bagdogra airport (IXB), near Siliguri, which is a 3-hour (approx. 90 km) drive from Darjeeling. Air India, GoAir, IndiGo and SpiceJet fly to Bagdogra.

== Railway ==
New Jalpaiguri, serving the town of Siliguri, is the nearest major railway station. New Jalpaiguri is well connected to major Indian cities, especially Kolkata.

== Intra-city transport ==
Intra-city transport is mostly by hired taxis. However, walking remains the most widely used method for travelling in this hilly town. Two-wheelers are also popularly used by the residents.

== Ropeway ==
The 8 km (5 mi) long Darjeeling Ropeway connecting Darjeeling's North Point with Singla, which was started in 1968, was closed after an accident in 2003. It reopened in February 2012.
