= Tumsong Tea Garden =

- Village
- Location in West Bengal, India Tumsong Tea Garden (India)
- Coordinates: 27.0362°N 88.1753°E
- Country: India
- State: West Bengal
- District: Darjeeling

Population (2011)
  - Total: 1,700
- Time zone: UTC+5:30 (IST)
- Lok Sabha constituency: Darjeeling
- Vidhan Sabha constituency: Darjeeling
- Website: darjeeling.gov.in

Tumsong Tea Garden is a village in the Jorebunglow Sukhiapokhri CD block in the Darjeeling Sadar subdivision of the Darjeeling district in the state of West Bengal, India.

== History ==
There was a temple of the Hindu goddess Tamsa Devi on a steep hill slope. In 1867, J.A. Wernicke started planting tea at the Tumsong Tea Garden. Tea plants were planted around the temple and the local people were allowed to go and worship the goddess. J.A. Wernicke also started the tea plantation at nearby Lingla. It started small at Tumsong with a 200-acre garden but it grew with time.

== Geography ==
Places and tea estates in the southern portion of Darjeeling Sadar subdivision (including Jorebunglow Sukhiapokhri CD block), and Mirik Subdivision in Darjeeling district
CT: census town, R: rural/ urban centre, NP: national park/ wildlife sanctuary, TE: tea estate
Abbreviations used in names – TG for Tea Garden (town/village), TE for Tea Estate
Owing to space constraints in the small map, the actual locations in a larger map may vary slightly

=== Location ===
Tumsong Tea Garden is located at 27.0362°N 88.1753°E. Tumsong Tea Garden produces one of the finest Darjeeling teas in an area of 114 hectares (280 acres) out of a total area of 186 hectares (460 acres) at an altitude ranging from 2,700 to 5,500 feet (820 to 1,680 m).

Tea gardens around Tumsong include: Lingia, Mariabong, Mem, Chungthong etc.

== Area overview ==
The map alongside shows a part of the southern portion of the Darjeeling Himalayan hill region in the Darjeeling district. In the Darjeeling Sadar subdivision 61.00% of the total population lives in the rural areas and 39.00% of the population lives in the urban areas. In the Mirik subdivision 80.11% of the total population lives in rural areas and 19.89% lives in urban areas. There are 78 tea gardens/ estates (the figure varies slightly according to different sources), in the district, producing and largely exporting Darjeeling tea. It engages a large proportion of the population directly/ indirectly. Some tea gardens were identified in the 2011 census as census towns or villages. Such places are marked in the map as CT (census town) or R (rural/ urban centre). Specific tea estate pages are marked TE.

Note: The map alongside presents some of the notable locations in the subdivision. All places marked in the map are linked in the larger full screen map.

== Demographics ==
According to the 2011 Census of India, Tumsong Tea Garden had a total population of 1,700 of which 815 (48%) were males and 885 (52%) were females. There were 123 persons in the age range of 0 to 6 years. The total number of literate people in Tumsong Tea Garden was 1,367 (80.41% of the population over 6 years).

== Economy ==
Tumsong Tea Garden produces 100% organic Darjeeling tea from pure Chinary cultivar . It employs 500 workers.

=== Chamong Group ===
The Chamong Group is the largest producer of organic Darjeeling tea and Assam tea. It produces 3,000 tonnes annually and employs 10,000 persons (including 7,000 women). It owns 4 tea estates in Assam and 13 in Darjeeling. The tea estates in Darjeeling are: Pussimbing, Chamong, Tumsong, Lingia, Nagri Farm, Bannockburn, Dhajea, Shree Dwarika, Ging, Soom, Phoobsering, Tukdah and Marybong. It exports tea to the US, Europe, Japan and the Middle East.

== Tourism ==
Tumsong Tea Garden has magnificent views of Kangchenjunga. The colonial planter's bungalow has been renovated and is used as a luxury resort.
