= Chamong Tea Garden =

Chamong Tea Garden Chamu Tea Garden
- Village
- Location in West Bengal, India Chamong Tea Garden (India)
- Coordinates: 26.957435°N 88.153343°E
- Country: India
- State: West Bengal
- District: Darjeeling

Population (2011)
  - Total: 2,352
- Time zone: UTC+5:30 (IST)
- Lok Sabha constituency: Darjeeling
- Vidhan Sabha constituency: Darjeeling
- Website: darjeeling.gov.in

Chamong Tea Garden (also called Chamu Tea Garden) is a village in the Jorebunglow Sukhiapokhri CD block in the Darjeeling Sadar subdivision of the Darjeeling district in the state of West Bengal, India.

== Etymology ==
There was a chirpy bird in this area, which the inhabitants, the Lepchas, used to call "Chamoo" and from that, the place became Chamong.

== History ==
Chamong Tea Garden was established by the British planters in 1871. It was one of the first gardens in Darjeeling to be acquired by the Lohia Group.

== Geography ==
Places and tea estates in the southern portion of Darjeeling Sadar subdivision (including Jorebunglow Sukhiapokhri CD block), and Mirik Subdivision in Darjeeling district
CT: census town, R: rural/ urban centre, NP: national park/ wildlife sanctuary, TE: tea estate
Abbreviations used in names – TG for Tea Garden (town/village), TE for Tea Estate
Owing to space constraints in the small map, the actual locations in a larger map may vary slightly

=== Location ===
Chamong Tea Garden is located at 26.957435°N 88.153343°E. Chamong Tea Garden has a cultivated area of 132 hectares (330 acres) out of the total area of 332 hectares (820 acres) at an altitude ranging from 1,150 to 1,850 metres (3,770 to 6,070 ft) above mean sea level.

=== Area overview ===
The map alongside shows a part of the southern portion of the Darjeeling Himalayan hill region in the Darjeeling district. In the Darjeeling Sadar subdivision 61.00% of the total population lives in the rural areas and 39.00% of the population lives in the urban areas. In the Mirik subdivision 80.11% of the total population lives in the rural areas and 19.89% lives in the urban areas. There are 78 tea gardens/ estates (the figure varies slightly according to different sources), in the district, producing and largely exporting Darjeeling tea. It engages a large proportion of the population directly/ indirectly. Some tea gardens were identified in the 2011 census as census towns or villages. Such places are marked in the map as CT (census town) or R (rural/ urban centre). Specific tea estate pages are marked TE.

Note: The map alongside presents some of the notable locations in the subdivision. All places marked in the map are linked in the larger full screen map.

== Demographics ==
According to the 2011 Census of India, Chamu Tea Garden had a total population of 2,352 of which 1,163 (49%) were males and 1,189 (51%) were females. There were 182 persons in the age range of 0 to 6 years. The total number of literate people in Chamu Tea Garden was 1,779 (75.64% of the population over 6 years).

== Economy ==
Chamong Tea Garden is Natural and Rainforest Alliance certified. It also has a fair trade certification.

=== Chamong Group ===
The Chamong Group is the largest producer of organic Darjeeling tea and Assam tea. It produces 3,000 tonnes annually and employs 10,000 persons (including 7,000 women). It owns 4 tea estates in Assam and 13 in Darjeeling. The tea estates in Darjeeling are: Pussimbing, Chamong, Tumsong, Lingia, Nagri Farm, Bannockburn, Dhajea, Shree Dwarika, Ging, Soom, Phoobsering, Tukdah and Marybong. It exports tea to the US, Europe, Japan and the Middle East.
