= Badamtam Tea Garden =

- Census Town
- Location in West Bengal, India Badamtam Tea Garden (India)
- Coordinates: 27.0994°N 88.2997°E
- Country: India
- State: West Bengal
- District: Darjeeling

Area
  - Total: 11.995 km^{2} (4.631 sq mi)

Population (2011)
  - Total: 6,102
  - Density: 508.7/km^{2} (1,318/sq mi)
- Time zone: UTC+5:30 (IST)
- Lok Sabha constituency: Darjeeling
- Vidhan Sabha constituency: Darjeeling
- Website: darjeeling.gov.in

Badamtam Tea Garden is a census town and a gram panchayat in the Darjeeling Pulbazar CD block in the Darjeeling Sadar subdivision of the Darjeeling district in the state of West Bengal, India.

== Geography ==
=== Location ===
Badamtam Tea Garden is located at 27.0994°N 88.2997°E.

=== Area overview ===
The map alongside shows the northern portion of the Darjeeling Himalayan hill region. Kangchenjunga, which rises with an elevation of 8,586 metres (28,169 ft) is located further north of the area shown. Sandakphu, rising to a height of 3,665 metres (12,024 ft), on the Singalila Ridge, is the highest point in West Bengal. In Darjeeling Sadar subdivision 61% of the total population lives in the rural areas and 39% of the population lives in the urban areas. There are 78 tea gardens/ estates (the figure varies slightly according to different sources), producing and largely exporting Darjeeling tea in the district. It engages a large proportion of the population directly/ indirectly. Some tea gardens were identified in the 2011 census as census towns or villages. Such places are marked in the map as CT (census town) or R (rural/ urban centre). Specific tea estate pages are marked TE.

Note: The map alongside presents some of the notable locations in the subdivision. All places marked in the map are linked in the larger full screen map.

== Demographics ==
According to the 2011 Census of India, Badamtam Tea Garden had a total population of 6,102 of which 2,987 (49%) were males and 3,115 (51%) were females. There were 520 persons in the age range of 0 to 6 years. The total number of literate people in Badamtam Tea Garden was 4,536 (74.34% of the population over 6 years).

== Infrastructure ==
According to the District Census Handbook 2011, Darjiling, Badamtam Tea Garden covered an area of 11.995 km^{2}. Among the civic amenities, it had 10 km roads with open drains, the protected water supply involved overhead tank and spring. It had 1,086 domestic electric connections. Among the medical facilities it had 1 dispensary/ health centre, 1 medicine shop. Among the educational facilities it had were 5 primary schools, 1 secondary school, the nearest senior secondary school at Darjeeling 21 km away. It had 5 non-formal education centres (Sarba Siksha Abhiyan). Among the social, cultural and recreational facilities, it had 1 auditorium/ community hall. An important commodity it manufactured was tea. It had the branch of 1 cooperative bank.

== Badamtam Tea Estate ==
Badamtam Tea Estate established in 1861, is located 17 km west of Darjeeling, in the picturesque Lebong Valley, at a height of 6,000 feet (1,800 m). A suspension bridge over the Rangeet links it to Sikkim. It produces excellent Darjeeling tea. It is owned by the Goodricke group.

== Education ==
Badamtam Junior High School is an English-medium coeducational institution established in 1971. It has facilities for teaching from class V to class VIII. It has a library with 150 books and a playground.
