= Rishihat Tea Garden =

- Village
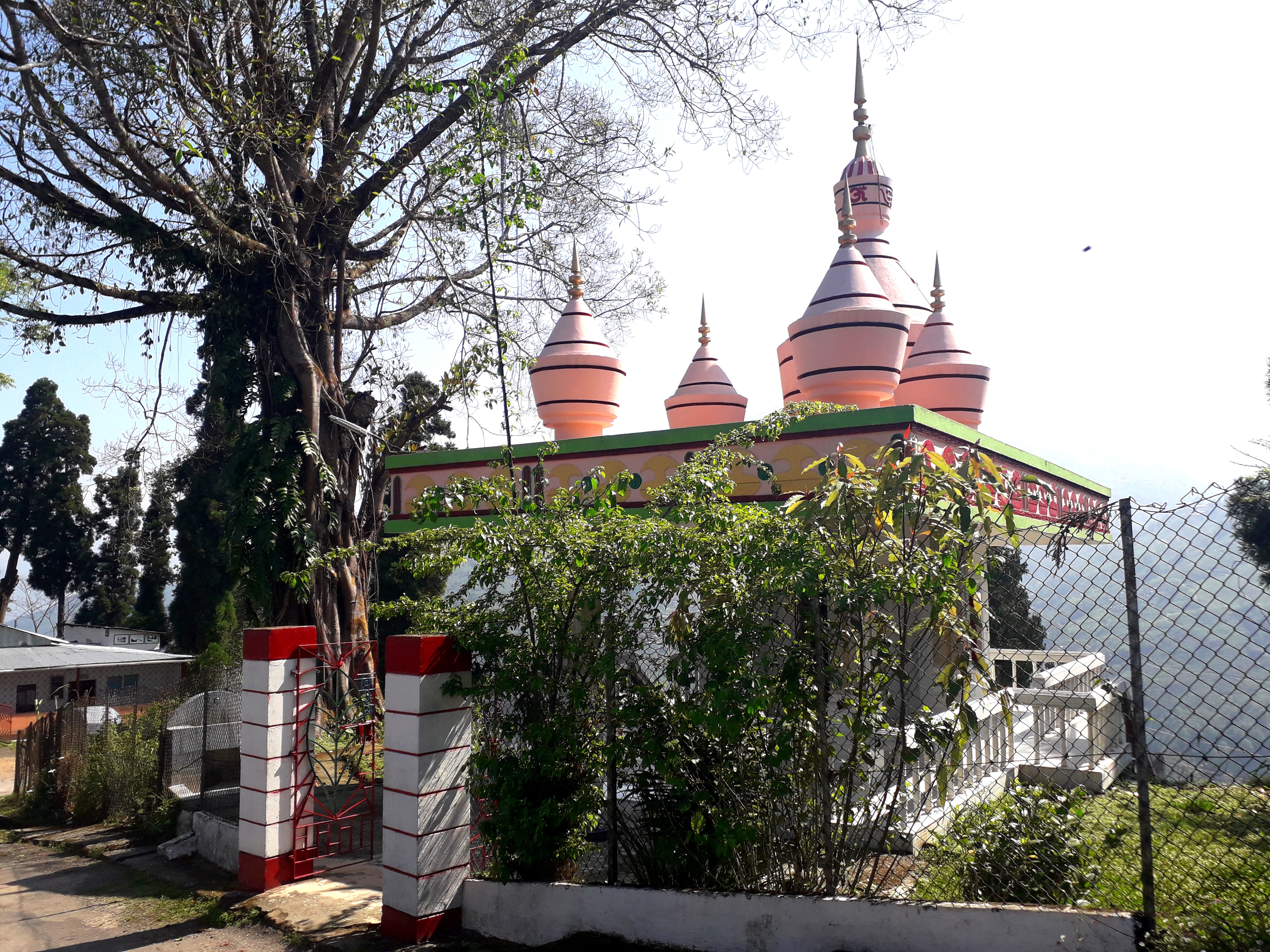
- Temple of Radha and Krishna

- Location in West Bengal, India Rishihat Tea Garden (India)
- Coordinates: 27.04062°N 88.21851°E
- Country: India
- State: West Bengal
- District: Darjeeling

Population (2011)
  - Total: 1,651
- Time zone: UTC+5:30 (IST)
- Lok Sabha constituency: Darjeeling
- Vidhan Sabha constituency: Darjeeling
- Website: darjeeling.gov.in

Rishihat Tea Garden (also spelled Risheehat) is a village in the Darjeeling Pulbazar CD block in the Darjeeling Sadar subdivision of the Darjeeling district in the state of West Bengal, India.

== History ==
The place was known as Tsering Bagan in its early history because of the predominance of Tserings (a Tibetan group) in the area. British planters established a tea garden in the place in the 1900s. It was later renamed Rishihat meaning ‘home of holy sages’. In 1955, it was acquired by Jay Shree Tea.

Prior to 1963, Liza Hill Tea Estate was a separate estate with its own tea factory, but later it became a division of Rishihat Tea Garden.

== Geography ==
Places and tea estates in the north-western portion of Darjeeling Sadar subdivision (including Darjeeling Pulbazar CD block) in Darjeeling district
CT: census town, R: rural/ urban centre, N: neighbourhood, H: hill centre, NP: national park/ wildlife sanctuary, TE: tea estate, TA: tourist attraction
Abbreviations used in names – TG for Tea Garden (town/village), TE for Tea Estate
Owing to space constraints in the small map, the actual locations in a larger map may vary slightly

=== Location ===
Rishihat Tea Garden is located at 27.04062°N 88.21851°E. Rishihat Tea Garden produces certified bio-organic Darjeeling tea from an area of 256.45 hectares (633.7 acres) of which 20 hectares (49 acres) are irrigated, at an altitude ranging from 2,500 to 4,800 feet (760 to 1,460 m).The garden is steepest in its topography. It has a rich and fertile soil.

Tea gardens around Rishihat include: Arya Tea Estate and Chongtong Tea Garden. It is about 14 km from Darjeeling.

=== Area overview ===
The map alongside shows the northern portion of the Darjeeling Himalayan hill region. Kangchenjunga, which rises with an elevation of 8,586 metres (28,169 ft) is located further north of the area shown. Sandakphu, rising to a height of 3,665 metres (12,024 ft), on the Singalila Ridge, is the highest point in West Bengal. In Darjeeling Sadar subdivision 61% of the total population lives in the rural areas and 39% of the population lives in the urban areas. There are 78 tea gardens/ estates (the figure varies slightly according to different sources), producing and largely exporting Darjeeling tea in the district. It engages a large proportion of the population directly/ indirectly. Some tea gardens were identified in the 2011 census as census towns or villages. Such places are marked in the map as CT (census town) or R (rural/ urban centre). Specific tea estate pages are marked TE.

Note: The map alongside presents some of the notable locations in the subdivision. All places marked in the map are linked in the larger full screen map.

== Demographics ==
According to the 2011 Census of India, Rishihat Tea Garden had a total population of 1,651 of which 815 (49%) were males and 836 (51%) were females. There were 111 persons in the age range of 0 to 6 years. The total number of literate people in Rishihat Tea Garden was 1,147 (69.47% of the population over 6 years).

== Economy ==
Rishihat Tea Garden annually produces over 180 tonnes of certified bio-organic teas. Rishihat Tea Garden has Fair Trade certification, ISO 1901:2008 awarded by TUV NORD and also HAACCP, and organic certificates for NPOP, POP and JAS by IMO.

It is famous for its second flush muscatel flavour. The types of tea the garden produces include: Black tea, Green tea, Oolong tea, hand rolled tea, Wirry tea, Silver Tippy tea, exclusive Darjeeling teas like Enigma, Exotic, Clonal Mush and Clonal Enigma.

The other tea gardens of the Jay Shree Tea & Industries Ltd., owned by the B.K.Birla group, in Darjeeling are: Puttabong (Tukvar) Tea Estate, Sungma Tea Garden, North Tukvar Tea Estate, Singbulli Tea Garden and Balasun Tea Estate.

== Education ==
Risheehat Higher Secondary School is a co-educational institution, established in the year of 1967 and has its affiliation with the West Bengal Board Of Education. The school has a fine library, computer room and capacious hall. In addition, the school authority and local people came forward and united in order to introduce the Higher Secondary Education. Eventually, after putting a tremendous effort it was achieved and the West Bengal Council of Higher Secondary Education accorded recognition up to class XII in 20 September 2013. <https://school.banglarshiksha.gov.in/ws/website/history/19012911001>

== Culture ==
It has a newly constructed temple of Lord Krishna and Radha. Furthermore, there is a beautiful monastery situated (probably) at the top of the village, named as 'Dhaychen Pemaling Gumba'. People from neighboring villages come to worship and offer prayers on the occasion of Buddha Jayanti or Buddha Purnima (every year). The festival is celebrated in a grand and traditional manner.
