= Singbulli Tea Garden =

- Village
- Location in West Bengal, India Singbulli Tea Garden (India)
- Coordinates: 26.8514°N 88.2136°E
- Country: India
- State: West Bengal
- District: Darjeeling

Population (2011)
  - Total: 3,306
- Time zone: UTC+5:30 (IST)
- Lok Sabha constituency: Darjeeling
- Vidhan Sabha constituency: Kurseong
- Website: darjeeling.gov.in

Singbulli Tea Garden is a village in the Mirik CD block in the Mirik subdivision of the Darjeeling district in the state of West Bengal.

== History ==
Singbulli Tea Garden was established by the British planters in 1924. Manjushree Tea and India pvt Ltd (Berlia) took over Singbulli Tea Garden in 2020.

== Geography ==
Places and tea estates in the southern portion of Darjeeling Sadar subdivision (including Jorebunglow Sukhiapokhri CD block), and Mirik Subdivision in Darjeeling district
CT: census town, R: rural/ urban centre, NP: national park/ wildlife sanctuary, TE: tea estate
Abbreviations used in names – TG for Tea Garden (town/village), TE for Tea Estate
Owing to space constraints in the small map, the actual locations in a larger map may vary slightly

=== Location ===
Singbulli Tea Garden is located at 26.8514°N 88.2136°E. Spread over across 9 rolling hills it has a cultivated area of 473.95 hectares (1,171.2 acres) at an altitude ranging from 1,200 to 4,100 feet (370 to 1,250 m) above mean sea level. It has an irrigated area of 106.57 hectares (263.3 acres). The garden has four divisions – Singbulli, Manja, Tingling and Murmah.

=== Area overview ===
The map alongside shows a part of the southern portion of the Darjeeling Himalayan hill region in the Darjeeling district. In the Darjeeling Sadar subdivision 61.00% of the total population lives in the rural areas and 39.00% of the population lives in the urban areas. In the Mirik subdivision 80.11% of the total population lives in the rural areas and 19.89% lives in the urban areas. There are 78 tea gardens/ estates (the figure varies slightly according to different sources), in the district, producing and largely exporting Darjeeling tea. It engages a large proportion of the population directly/ indirectly. Some tea gardens were identified in the 2011 census as census towns or villages. Such places are marked in the map as CT (census town) or R (rural/ urban centre). Specific tea estate pages are marked TE.

Tea garden life
Narendra Puri, then employed with Goodricke, had gone, with his wife, to Siliguri, in 1971. They were returning on a cold and foggy evening to Thurbo Tea Estate via Mirik. Narendra's classic Willis jeep was in full throttle. While negotiating one of the bends in Singbulli Tea Garden, a leopard jumped across the jeep. They were stunned. Narendra's wife, Kumkum, was from Delhi and had never seen a leopard in the wild. She was terribly frightened. Narendra stopped the jeep and they saw the leopard vanish into the bushes. Leopards, elephants and rabbits were rather common sights in the tea gardens. Narendra recalls that towards end of the month, young bachelors, usually gone broke, went out for rabbit hunting, and once they got one, they landed with the game in the senior assistant's bungalow. They were assured of a drink before dinner with rice and hot rabbit curry.

Note: The map alongside presents some of the notable locations in the subdivision. All places marked in the map are linked in the larger full screen map.

== Demographics ==
According to the 2011 Census of India, Singbulli Tea Garden had a total population of 3,306 of which 1,658 (50%) were males and 1,648 (50%) were females. There were 296 persons in the age range of 0 to 6 years. The total number of literate people in Singbulli Tea Garden was 2,561 (77.47% of the population over 6 years).

== Economy ==
Singbulli Tea Garden produces 250 tonnes of Darjeeling tea annually and that includes black tea, green tea and speciality teas. Clonal Tea, First Flush Tea, Second Flush Tea and Autumn Tea from Singbulli are famous.

Singbulli Tea Garden is 100% organic tea certified by IMO Control, DUTCH HACCP by SGS, and certified for fair trade.

Singbulli Tea Garden employs 1,325 workers.

Other tea gardens owned by the Jay Shree Tea & Manufacturing of the B.K.Birla Group are: Puttabong (Tukvar) Tea Estate, Sungma Tea Garden, North Tukvar Tea Estate, Rishihat Tea Garden and Balasun.
