= Lebong =

Lebong may refer to:

- Lebong & Mineral Spring Tea Garden, a village in West Bengal, India
- Lebong Valley, a valley in Darjeeling, India
- Lebong Regency, a regency in Bengkulu, Indonesia
- Lebong Tandai, a village in Bengkulu, Indonesia
