= Sungma Tea Garden =

- Village
- Location in West Bengal, India Sungma Tea Garden (India)
- Coordinates: 26.943435°N 88.176343°E
- Country: India
- State: West Bengal
- District: Darjeeling

Population (2011)
  - Total: 2,404
- Time zone: UTC+5:30 (IST)
- PIN: 734216 (Pokhriabong)
- Lok Sabha constituency: Darjeeling
- Vidhan Sabha constituency: Darjeeling
- Website: darjeeling.gov.in

Sungma Tea Garden is spread over two villages - Sangmaru Tea Garden (Sungma) and Tarzun Tea Garden in the Jorebunglow Sukhiapokhri CD block in the Darjeeling Sadar subdivision of the Darjeeling district in the state of West Bengal, India.

== Etymology ==
In a Tibetan dialect, "Sanga-maru" means a place where mushrooms grow wildly and abundantly and "Taru-zum" means the place of a weekly village market.

== History ==
Sungma Tea Garden was established by British tea planters between 1863 and 1868. Tarzum Tea Garden was also established in the 1860s. A devastating earthquake in 1934 destroyed the tea factory at Sungma. Thereafter, the two gardens were merged and the entire manufacturing operations were shifted to Tarzun.

The information available about ownership of the garden varies a little. Jay Shree Tea site says that Jay Shree Tea took over the gardens in 1993. Other sources say that the Jhunjhunwalas took over the gardens in the late 1950s. In the mid-1950s Jindals took over the gardens and Jay Shree Tea took over the gardens in 1993.

== Geography ==
Places and tea estates in the southern portion of Darjeeling Sadar subdivision (including Jorebunglow Sukhiapokhri CD block), and Mirik Subdivision in Darjeeling district
CT: census town, R: rural/ urban centre, NP: national park/ wildlife sanctuary, TE: tea estate
Abbreviations used in names – TG for Tea Garden (town/village), TE for Tea Estate
Owing to space constraints in the small map, the actual locations in a larger map may vary slightly

=== Location ===
Sungma Tea Garden is located at 26.943435°N 88.176343°E.

Sungma Tea Garden is located in the Rong Bong valley, famous for growing exclusive quality tea. The garden is at an altitude ranging from 1,100 to 1,700 metres (3,600 to 5,600 ft). The tea cultivation area is 281.95 hectares (696.7 acres), out of which 25 hectares (62 acres) is irrigated. The varieties of tea produced are: Black tea, Green tea, Oolong tea, White tea, Tea flower, exclusive Darjeeling Clonal teas like Himalayan Mystique, Clonal Delight, Clonal Enigma and Clonal wonder.

The climate is cool and misty with temperatures ranging from 3 °C in winter to 28 °C in summer. Annual rainfall is 2,500 to 3,000 mm, mostly during July to September.

Sungma Tea Garden has a reserved forest with 3,000 pine trees.

=== Area overview ===
The map alongside shows a part of the southern portion of the Darjeeling Himalayan hill region in the Darjeeling district. In the Darjeeling Sadar subdivision 61.00% of the total population lives in the rural areas and 39.00% of the population lives in the urban areas. In the Mirik subdivision 80.11% of the total population lives in the rural areas and 19.89% lives in the urban areas. There are 78 tea gardens/ estates (the figure varies slightly according to different sources), in the district, producing and largely exporting Darjeeling tea. It engages a large proportion of the population directly/ indirectly. Some tea gardens were identified in the 2011 census as census towns or villages. Such places are marked in the map as CT (census town) or R (rural/ urban centre). Specific tea estate pages are marked TE.

Note: The map alongside presents some of the notable locations in the subdivision. All places marked in the map are linked in the larger full screen map.

== Achievements ==
It has Organic certification for NPOP, NOP and JAS by IMO, Fair Trade certification, ISO 1901:2008 & HACCP awarded by TUV NORD.

== Demographics ==
According to the 2011 Census of India, Sagmaru Tea Garden (Sungma) had a total population of 2,229 of which 1,072 (48%) were males and 1,157 (52%) were females. There were 159 persons in the age range of 0 to 6 years. The total number of literate people in Sagmaru Tea Garden (Sungma) was 1,851 (83.04% of the population over 6 years).

According to the 2011 Census of India, Tarzun Tea Garden had a total population of 2,232 of which 1,098 (49%) were males and 1,134 (51%) were females. There were 170 persons in the age range of 0 to 6 years. The total number of literate people in Tarzun Tea Garden was 1,774 (79.48% of the population over 6 years).

== Economy ==
Established in 1945, Jay Shree Tea & Industries Ltd. is a part of the B.K.Birla Group. It owns 22 tea estates in India and East Africa. The tea estates of Jay Shree Tea in Darjeeling are: Puttabong, North Tukvar, Rishihat, Singbuli, Balasun and Sungma.

== Welfare activities ==
Sungma Tea Garden has a football ground with a pavilion. There is Shiva Gouri temple.
