= Darjeeling (disambiguation) =

Darjeeling is a hill station municipality in West Bengal, India.

Darjeeling may also refer to:

- Darjeeling tea, a beverage made in Darjeeling

== Administrative areas of India ==
- Darjeeling district, a subdivision of West Bengal
- Darjeeling Lok Sabha constituency, a constituency of India's lower house
- Darjeeling Assembly constituency, a state assembly constituency
- Darjeeling Pulbazar (community development block)

== Arts and entertainment ==
- The Darjeeling Limited, a 2007 American comedy-drama film directed by Wes Anderson
- Darjeeling, a character from the Japanese anime and manga series Girls und Panzer
- "Darjeeling", a song on Caprisongs by FKA Twigs
