= Puttabong Tea Estate =

Tea garden in West Bengal, India

- Puttagong (Tukvar) Tea Estate
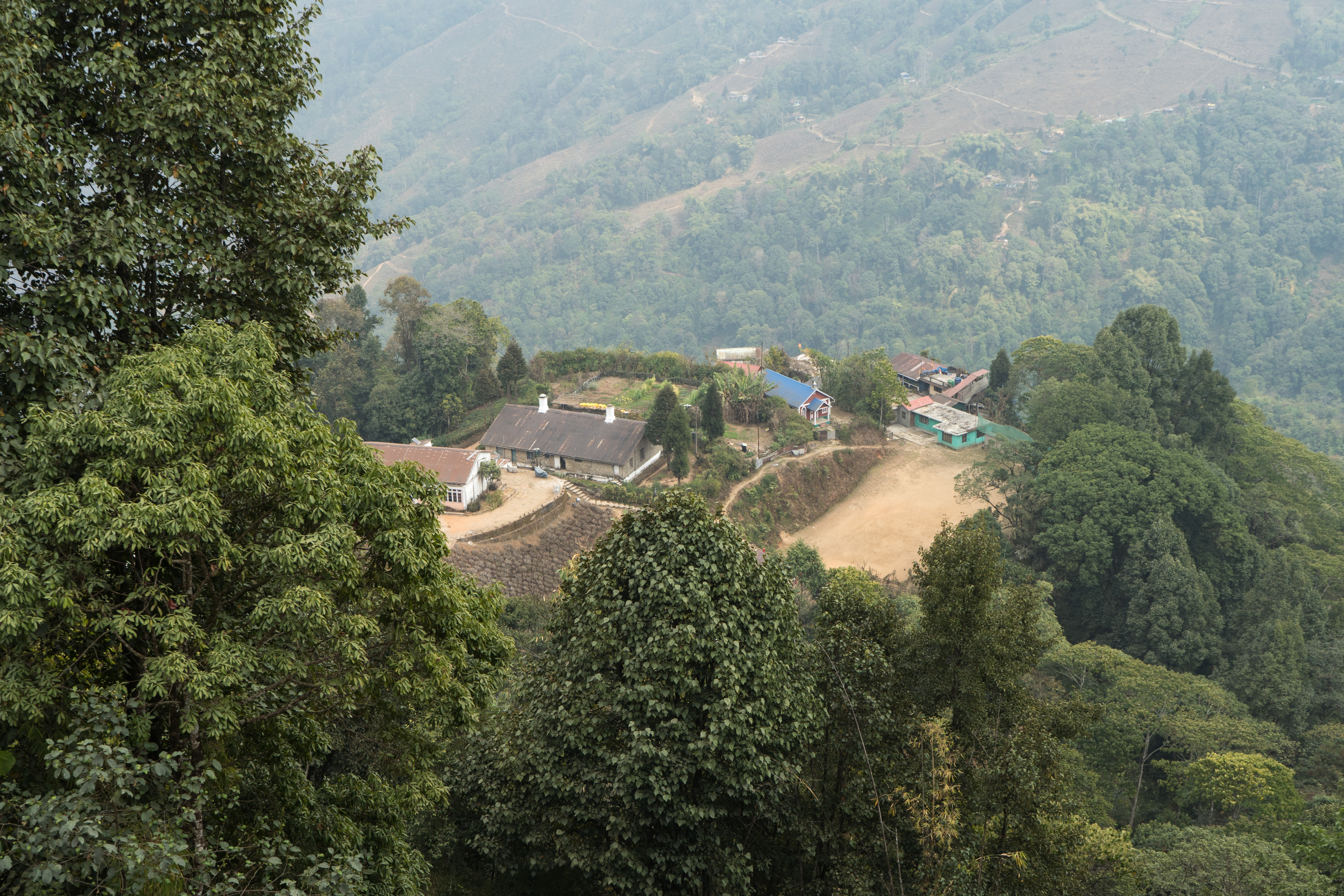
- Puttabong Tea Estate
- Interactive map of Puttabong Tea Estate
- Location: Darjeeling district, West Bengal, India
- Coordinates: 27.06662°N 88.25831°E
- Area: 4.37 km^{2} (1.69 sq mi)
- Elevation: 500 to 6,500 feet (150 to 1,980 m)
- Owner: Jay Shree Tea & Manufacturing Pvt. Ltd.
- Open: 1852

Puttabong Tea Estate (formerly known as Tukvar Tea Estate) is a tea garden in the Darjeeling Pulbazar CD block in the Darjeeling Sadar subdivision of the Darjeeling district in the Indian state of West Bengal.

== Etymology ==
Puttabong means a house of green leaves.

== History ==
Puttabong Tea Estate was the first garden in the Darjeeling Himalayan hill region to be planted by the pioneering British tea planter Dr Campbell in 1852. It is now owned by Jay Shree Tea & Manufacturing Ltd.

== Geography ==
Places and tea estates in the north-western portion of Darjeeling Sadar subdivision (including Darjeeling Pulbazar CD block) in Darjeeling district
CT: census town, R: rural/ urban centre, N: neighbourhood, H: hill centre, NP: national park/ wildlife sanctuary, TE: tea estate, TA: tourist attraction
Abbreviations used in names – TG for Tea Garden (town/village), TE for Tea Estate
Owing to space constraints in the small map, the actual locations in a larger map may vary slightly

Puttabong Tea Estate is one of the largest gardens in Darjeeling, spanning 20 km across. It is spread over an area of 4.37 km^{2} (1.69 sq mi). Tea cultivation is carried out over an area of 436.72 ha (1,079.2 acres) and 106.57 ha (263.3 acres) are irrigated.

Note: The map alongside presents some of the notable locations in the subdivision. All places marked in the map are linked in the larger full screen map.

== Achievements ==
Puttabong is the first Darjeeling garden to get ISO 9002:2008 certification in manufacturing, plantation and marketing.

It was the first garden to fetch a record price of Rs. 10,001 per kg for its Antique tea. It produces the finest Darjeeling tea appreciated by discerning buyers around the world around.

== Jay Shree Tea ==
Incorporated in 1945, Jay Shree Tea and Manufacturing Ltd. is the third largest tea producer in the world with 22 tea estates spread across India and East Africa. Other tea estates of Jay Shree Tea in Darjeeling are: Rishihat, Sungma, North Tukvar, Singbulli and Balasun.

== Workers ==
The garden employs 1,456 employees, who are provided with housing, healthcare and social amenities.
