= Dangia =

Village in West Bengal, India

- Village
- Location within West Bengal Location within India
- Coordinates: 27°1′16″N 88°4′9″E
- Country: India
- State: West Bengal
- Region: Darjiling
- Community development block: Darjeeling Pulbazar

Dangia is a village in the Pulbazar subregion, in Darjeeling Pulbazar. Dangia is a sub-locale of Darjiling region in the Indian state of West Bengal. The population density is 355 people per 1 km^{2}.

The closest town is Darjeeling (52 km away). Forest composes 4% of the village.

== Demographics ==
Among the 1,768 residents of Dangia, 51% (895) are male and 49% (873) are female. 46% of the entire population are from general rank, 11% are from plan position and 42% are from plan tribes. Children 6 and under make up 13% of the population. 396 families live in the town. The average household size is 4.

The population of the town has expanded by 9.9% in the last 10 years. The female population has increased by 9.1%, 1.5% lower than the male population increase of 10.6%.

The 2011 census found 975 females for each 1000 males. It found 1000 girls under 6 for every 1000 boys.

An estimated 1118 individuals in the town are literate, including 641 males and 477 females. The literacy rate of Dangia is 72%. 82% of males and 63% of females are literate. The male education rate increased by 7% and female education rate increased by 10% since the prior census.

== Economy ==
45% (798) of Dangia's population is employed. 57% of the male and 33% of the female population earn money. 40% of the male population are principally laborers and 16% are minor (low maintenance) specialists. 13% of the female population are fundamental and 20% are peripheral specialists.
