= Pussimbing Tea Estate =

Tea garden in West Bengal, India

- Interactive map of Pussimbing Tea Estate
- Location: Darjeeling district, West Bengal, India
- Coordinates: 26.9902°N 88.2238°E
- Area: 280 ha (690 acres)
- Elevation: 4,500 to 6,000 ft (1,400 to 1,800 m)
- Owner: Chamong Group
- Open: 1911

Pussimbing is a tea estate in West Bengal, India.

== Geography ==
Places and tea estates in the southern portion of Darjeeling Sadar subdivision (including Jorebunglow Sukhiapokhri CD block), and Mirik Subdivision in Darjeeling district
CT: census town, R: rural/ urban centre, NP: national park/ wildlife sanctuary, TE: tea estate
Abbreviations used in names – TG for Tea Garden (town/village), TE for Tea Estate
Owing to space constraints in the small map, the actual locations in a larger map may vary slightly

=== Location ===
It is located about 6 kilometres (3.7 mi) from the Ghum railway station in the Darjeeling Himalayan hill region. It is located on the slopes of Tiger Hill.

== Economy ==
The plantation is bio-organic with 100% China bushes. It converted to 100% organic cultivation in 1994 and is certified by IMO control, Switzerland. The plantation covers over 200 hectares (500 acres). The plantation was extended by the British Planters in 1911 and today it is a source of the finest organic tea in Darjeeling.

Residents of the area are of Nepalease origin, and 15% work in the plantation, which is divided into 3 divisions: Pussimbing, Lami & Minjoo, and Kothi Dhura. The processing plant is in nearby, along the Balason River and has been modernized by Chamong Group to ensure quality and product safety.

The plant uses hydroelectric power to minimize pollution in the sensitive area and reduce use of fossil fuels. A small hydro electricity project plant was established in 1994; hitherto the plant ran on diesel power. It also supplies electricity to houses nearby.

=== Chamong Group ===
The Chamong Group is the largest producer of organic Darjeeling tea and Assam tea. It produces 3,000 tonnes annually and employs 10,000 persons (including 7,000 women). It owns 4 tea estates in Assam and 13 in Darjeeling. The tea estates in Darjeeling are: Pussimbing, Chamong, Tumsong, Lingia, Nagri Farm, Bannockburn, Dhajea, Shree Dwarika, Ging, Soom, Phoobsering, Tukdah and Marybong. It exports tea to the US, Europe, Japan and the Middle East.
