= Singla Tea Garden =

- Village
- Location in West Bengal, India Singla Tea Garden (India)
- Coordinates: 27.1194°N 88.2997°E
- Country: India
- State: West Bengal
- District: Darjeeling

Population (2011)
  - Total: 3,400
- Time zone: UTC+5:30 (IST)
- PIN: 734 104
- Lok Sabha constituency: Darjeeling
- Vidhan Sabha constituency: Darjeeling
- Website: darjeeling.gov.in

Singla Tea Garden is a village in the Darjeeling Pulbazar CD block in the Darjeeling Sadar subdivision of the Darjeeling district in the state of West Bengal, India. (Note: This article is about a village in the Rangeet valley 16 km from Darjeeling and is not to be confused with a neighbourhood of the same name in the outskirts of Darjeeling.)

== Geography ==
Places and tea estates in the north-western portion of Darjeeling Sadar subdivision (including Darjeeling Pulbazar CD block) in Darjeeling district
CT: census town, R: rural/ urban centre, N: neighbourhood, H: hill centre, NP: national park/ wildlife sanctuary, TE: tea estate, TA: tourist attraction
Abbreviations used in names – TG for Tea Garden (town/village), TE for Tea Estate
Owing to space constraints in the small map, the actual locations in a larger map may vary slightly

=== Location ===
Singla Tea Garden is located at 27.1194°N 88.2997°E.

=== Area overview ===
The map alongside shows the northern portion of the Darjeeling Himalayan hill region. Kangchenjunga, which rises with an elevation of 8,586 metres (28,169 ft) is located further north of the area shown. Sandakphu, rising to a height of 3,665 metres (12,024 ft), on the Singalila Ridge, is the highest point in West Bengal. In Darjeeling Sadar subdivision 61% of the total population lives in the rural areas and 39% of the population lives in the urban areas. There are 78 tea gardens/ estates (the figure varies slightly according to different sources), producing and largely exporting Darjeeling tea in the district. It engages a large proportion of the population directly/ indirectly. Some tea gardens were identified in the 2011 census as census towns or villages. Such places are marked in the map as CT (census town) or R (rural/ urban centre). Specific tea estate pages are marked TE.

Note: The map alongside presents some of the notable locations in the subdivision. All places marked in the map are linked in the larger full screen map.

== Demographics ==
According to the 2011 Census of India, Singla Tea Garden had a total population of 3,400 of which 1,715 (50%) were males and 1,685 (50%) were females. There were 293 persons in the age range of 0 to 6 years. The total number of literate people in Singla Tea Garden was 2.254 (66.29% of the population over 6 years).

== Darjeeling Ropeway ==
Darjeeling Ropeway was started in 1968 from Singamari in Darjeeling. In 45 minutes, the ropeway transported passengers from a height of 7,000 ft down to 800 feet where the last station was located at Singla Bazar on the banks of the Rangeet. As of 2020, the ropeway runs only up to Tukvar.

== Education ==
St. Mary's School in Singla valley has 480 students. Some of the students have to walk for an hour to reach the school.
