= Singtam Tea Garden =

- Census Town
- Location in West Bengal, India Singtam Tea Garden (India)
- Coordinates: 27.0552°N 88.2288°E
- Country: India
- State: West Bengal
- District: Darjeeling

Area
  - Total: 5.9975 km^{2} (2.3156 sq mi)

Population (2011)
  - Total: 5,792
  - Density: 965.7/km^{2} (2,501/sq mi)
- Time zone: UTC+5:30 (IST)
- PIN: 734102
- Telephone/STD code: 0354
- Lok Sabha constituency: Darjeeling
- Vidhan Sabha constituency: Darjeeling
- Website: darjeeling.gov.in

Singtam Tea Garden (also spelled Singtom) is a census town in Darjeeling Pulbazar CD block, Darjeeling Sadar subdivision, Darjeeling district, West Bengal, India.

== Geography ==
Places and tea estates in the north-western portion of Darjeeling Sadar subdivision (including Darjeeling Pulbazar CD block) in Darjeeling district
CT: census town, R: rural/ urban centre, N: neighbourhood, H: hill centre, NP: national park/ wildlife sanctuary, TE: tea estate, TA: tourist attraction
Abbreviations used in names – TG for Tea Garden (town/village), TE for Tea Estate
Owing to space constraints in the small map, the actual locations in a larger map may vary slightly

=== Location ===
Singtam Tea Garden is located at 27.0552°N 88.2288°E.

=== Area overview ===
The map alongside shows the northern portion of the Darjeeling Himalayan hill region. Kangchenjunga, which rises with an elevation of 8,586 metres (28,169 ft) is located further north of the area shown. Sandakphu, rising to a height of 3,665 metres (12,024 ft), on the Singalila Ridge, is the highest point in West Bengal. In Darjeeling Sadar subdivision 61% of the total population lives in the rural areas and 39% of the population lives in the urban areas. There are 78 tea gardens/ estates (the figure varies slightly according to different sources), producing and largely exporting Darjeeling tea in the district. It engages a large proportion of the population directly/ indirectly. Some tea gardens were identified in the 2011 census as census towns or villages. Such places are marked in the map as CT (census town) or R (rural/ urban centre). Specific tea estate pages are marked TE.

Note: The map alongside presents some of the notable locations in the subdivision. All places marked in the map are linked in the larger full screen map.

== Demographics ==
According to the 2011 Census of India, Singtam Tea Garden had a total population of 5,792 of which 2,850 (49%) were males and 2,942 (51%) were females. There were 416 persons in the age range of 0 to 6 years. The total number of literate people in Singtam Tea Garden was 4,649 (80.27% of the population over 6 years).

== Infrastructure ==
According to the District Census Handbook 2011, Darjiling, Singtam Tea Garden covered an area of 5.9975 km^{2}. Its protected water supply involved overhead tank and tap water from untreated sources. The town had 1,182 domestic electric connections. One dispensary/health centre was reported. There were five primary schools and one middle school, with the nearest secondary and senior secondary school located in Darjeeling, 10 km away. It had four non-formal education centres (Sarba Siksha Abhiyan). The town had 1 auditorium or community hall. An important commodity it manufactured was tea.

== Singtam Tea Estate ==
Singtam Tea Estate, 6 km from Darjeeling, was established in 1852. It covers 263 hectares. It belongs to the Camelia Tea Group Private Limited. According to another source, Singtam Tea Estate was set up in 1854 by a German priest, Joachim Stoelke. He also planted Darjeeling's oldest tea estate in 1852, at a nearby site called Steinthal.

The Singtom Tea Estate & Resort was established in 1862 and is described by its management as the "world's oldest tea estate-resort".
