= Lodhoma =

- Village
- Location in West Bengal, India Lodhoma (India)
- Coordinates: 27.1051°N 88.1221°E
- Country: India
- State: West Bengal
- District: Drjeeling

Population (2011)
  - Total: 703
- Time zone: UTC+5:30 (IST)
- PIN: 734201
- Lok Sabha constituency: Darjeeling
- Vidhan Sabha constituency: Darjeeling
- Website: darjeeling.gov.in

Lodhoma is a village and gram panchayat in the Darjeeling Pulbazar CD block in the Darjeeling Sadar subdivision of the Darjeeling district in the state of West Bengal, India.

== Geography ==
Places and tea estates in the north-western portion of Darjeeling Sadar subdivision (including Darjeeling Pulbazar CD block) in Darjeeling district
CT: census town, R: rural/ urban centre, N: neighbourhood, H: hill centre, NP: national park/ wildlife sanctuary, TE: tea estate, TA: tourist attraction
Abbreviations used in names – TG for Tea Garden (town/village), TE for Tea Estate
Owing to space constraints in the small map, the actual locations in a larger map may vary slightly

=== Location ===
Lodhoma is located at 27.1051°N 88.1221°E.

Singalila National Park on the Singalila Ridge is located nearby. It is spread over 78.6 km^{2}at a height ranging from 7,900 ft (2,400 m) to 12,000 ft (3,700 m).

=== Area overview ===
The map alongside shows the northern portion of the Darjeeling Himalayan hill region. Kangchenjunga, which rises with an elevation of 8,586 metres (28,169 ft) is located further north of the area shown. Sandakphu, rising to a height of 3,665 metres (12,024 ft), on the Singalila Ridge, is the highest point in West Bengal. In Darjeeling Sadar subdivision 61% of the total population lives in the rural areas and 39% of the population lives in the urban areas. There are 78 tea gardens/ estates (the figure varies slightly according to different sources), producing and largely exporting Darjeeling tea in the district. It engages a large proportion of the population directly/ indirectly. Some tea gardens were identified in the 2011 census as census towns or villages. Such places are marked in the map as CT (census town) or R (rural/ urban centre). Specific tea estate pages are marked TE.

Note: The map alongside presents some of the notable locations in the subdivision. All places marked in the map are linked in the larger full screen map.

== Demographics ==
According to the 2011 Census of India, Lodhoma had a total population of 703 of which 348 (50%) were males and 355 (50%) were females. There were 40 persons in the age range of 0 to 6 years. The total number of literate people in Lodhoma was 578 (82.22% of the population over 6 years).

== Civic Administration ==
=== Police station ===
Lodhoma police station has jurisdiction over the Darjeeling Pulbazar CD block.

== Economy ==
Rammam Hydroelectric Power Plant, commissioned in 1995–96, is located 3 km upstream of Lodhama.

== Healthcare ==
There is a primary health centre, with 10 beds, at Lodhoma.
