= Darjeeling Ropeway =

Aerial tramway in West Bengal, India

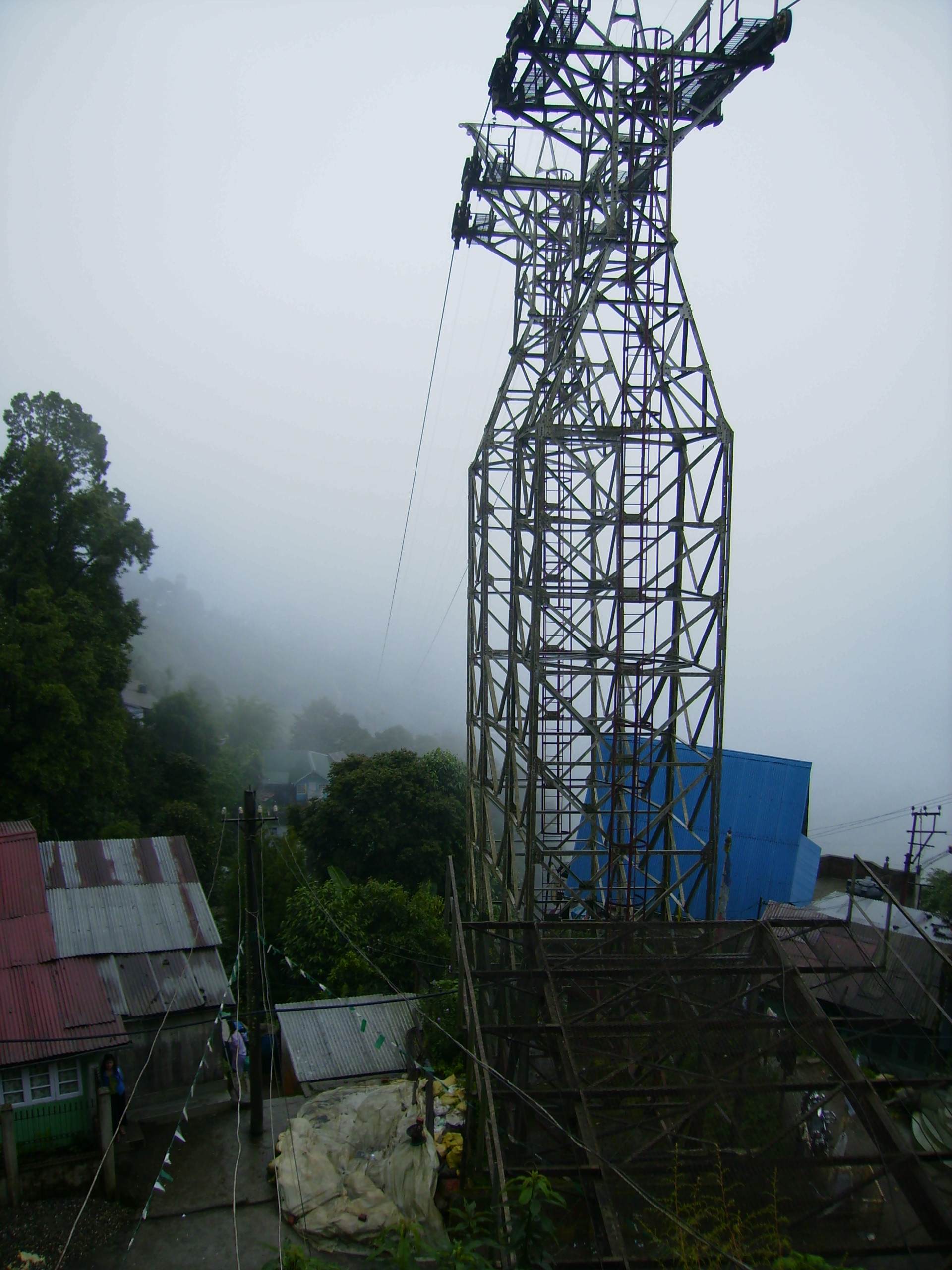
Darjeeling Ropeway

The Darjeeling Ropeway is a ropeway in the town of Darjeeling in the Indian state of West Bengal. The 5 km long ropeway( i.e. 2.5 km each way) is a tourist destination in the town. It consists of sixteen cars and plies between the "North Point" in the town of Darjeeling and Singla on the banks of the Ramman river. The journey on the ropeway offers views of the hills and the valleys around Darjeeling.

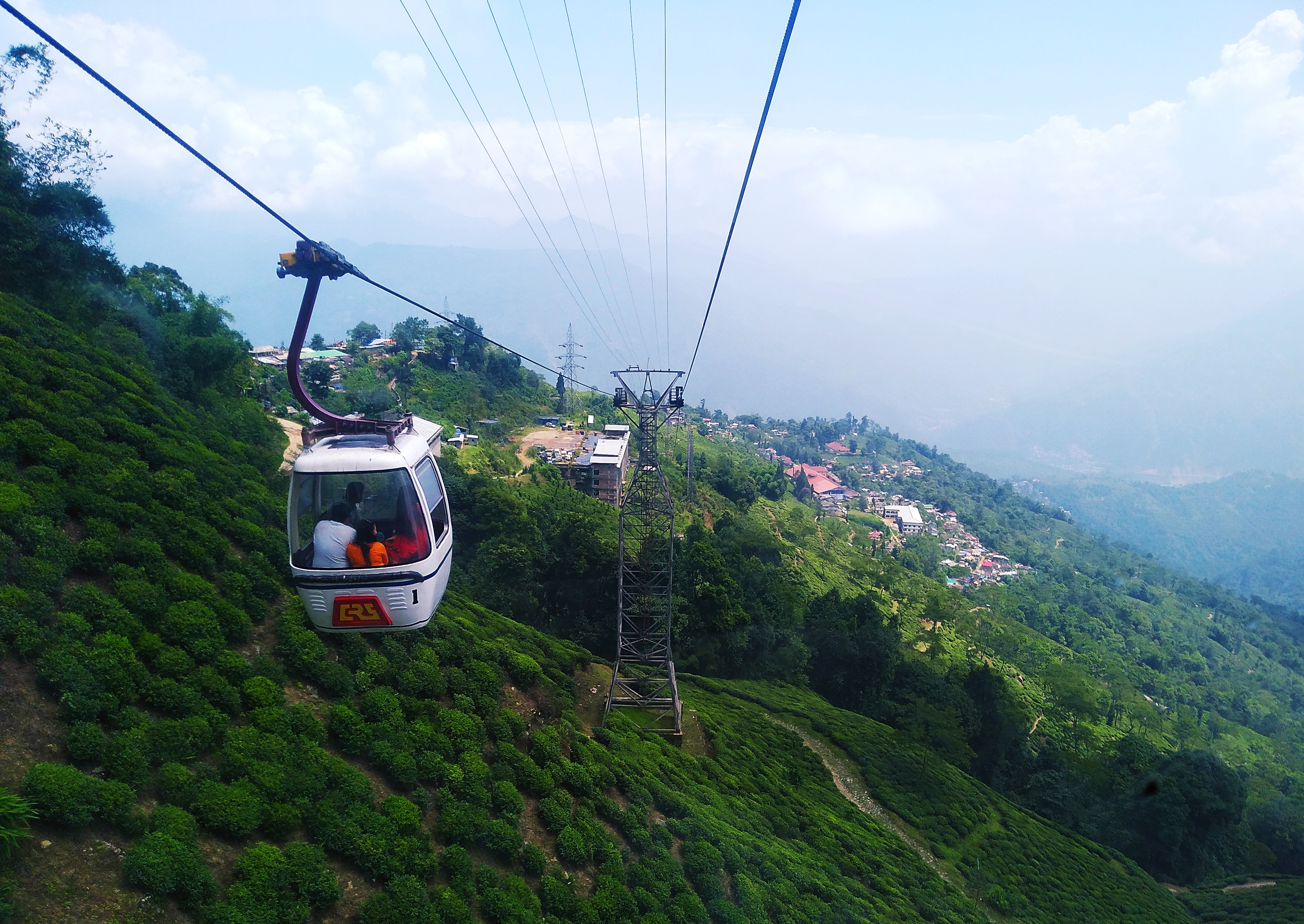
Different view of Darjeeling Ropeway

The ropeway, which was started in 1968 and revamped in 1998, was stopped in October 2003 after four tourists died. The ropeway was reopened on 2 February 2012.

== The ropeway ==
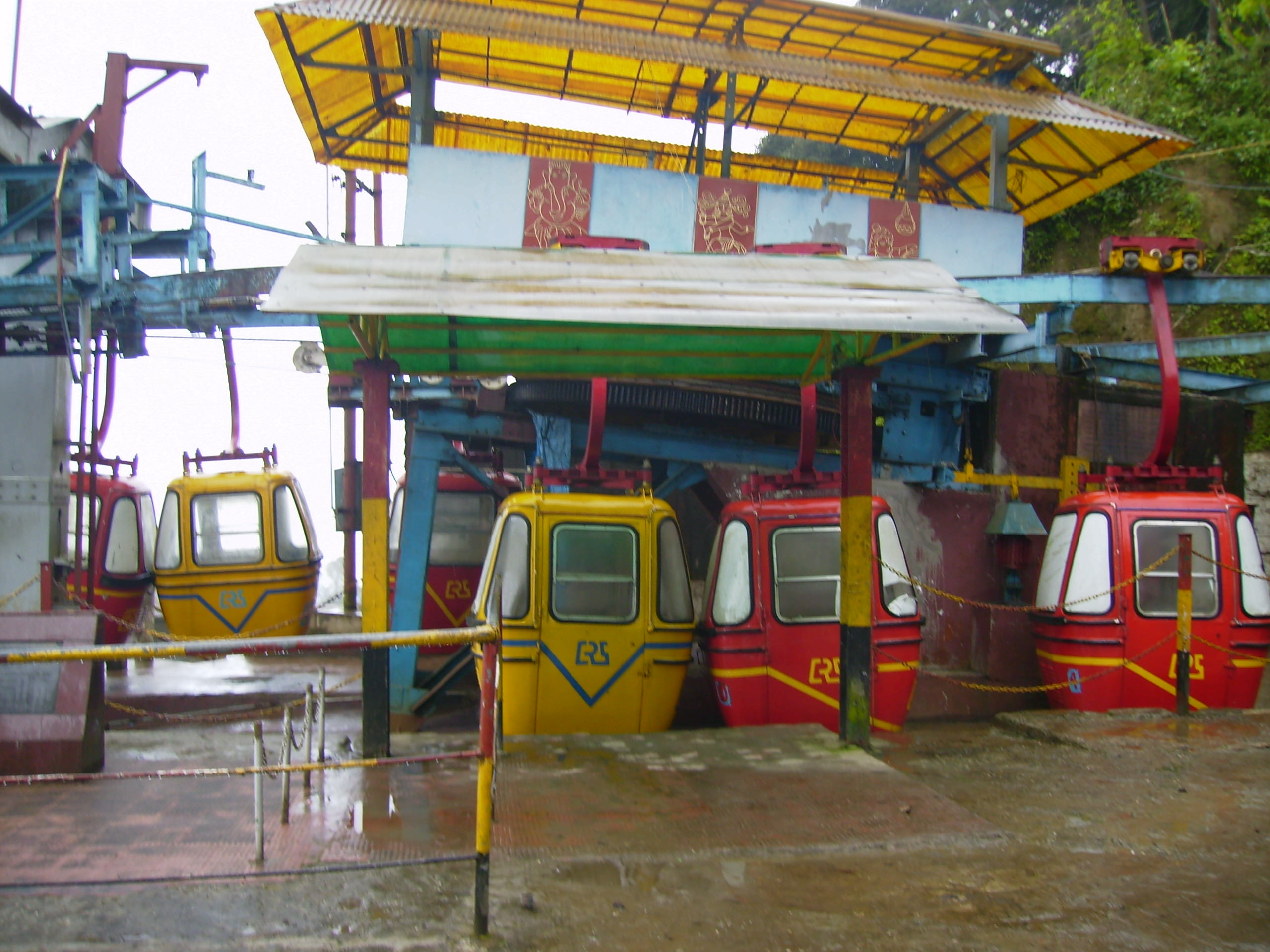
Cable Cars

The ropeway was started in 1968 and consisted of a single car. From an elevation of 2,134 m (7,001 ft) in Darjeeling’s North Point (Singamari), this bicable ropeway descends to 244 m (801 ft) at Singla on the banks of the Ramman river, which with Little Rangeet, meets the Great Rangeet. Stopping at Tukver, Burnesbeg and Singla Tea Garden, it takes 45 minutes to reach Singla Bazar, 8 km away. The ropeway passes over dense forests, mountain ridges, water falls, flowing rivers, green valleys and tea gardens.

The Great Rangeet flows from the glacial elevation of Kabru, in the lower regions of the Kanchenjunga, meeting first the Ramman and then the Little Rangeet further down. Singla offers is a view of the valleys of these two streams. The Little Rangeet flows across the lush green Bijanbari valley. While the Little Rangeet is overflowing with trout, the valley has wildlife, flowers and butterflies.

The passenger ropeway was operated as a joint venture of the West Bengal Forest Development Corporation and the Conveyor and Ropeway Services Private Ltd. It had been revamped in 1998.

== Accident and Inquiry ==
Four tourists were killed and 11 others injured on 19 October 2003 when three carriages of the Ropeway slipped off the cables. An inquiry, headed by then Jalpaiguri division commissioner Balbir Ram, had said that one of the reasons for the accident was a change in alignment of the ropeway following a shift in the mountains. However, engineers involved in ropeway construction disagreed and said that such a shift happens over a long period of time, unless an earthquake occurs.

According to PWD officials, the company that operated the ropeway had reinstated it. But before it started functioning, the forest department had asked the PWD to carry out an inspection and issue a certificate of fitness. Devices like limit switches, rope-catches and guards would be electrically operated and any flaw in the system would automatically halt the entire service. Such a system mitigates accidents due to human error and safeguards against the possibility of another catastrophe.
