= Lebong & Mineral Spring Tea Garden =

- Village
- Location in West Bengal, India Lebong & Mineral Spring Tea Garden (India)
- Coordinates: 27.04262°N 88.29951°E
- Country: India
- State: West Bengal
- District: Darjeeling

Population (2011)
  - Total: 6,236
- Time zone: UTC+5:30 (IST)
- Lok Sabha constituency: Darjeeling
- Vidhan Sabha constituency: Darjeeling
- Website: darjeeling.gov.in

Lebong & Mineral Spring Tea Garden is a village in the Darjeeling Pulbazar CD block in the Darjeeling Sadar subdivision of the Darjeeling district in the state of West Bengal, India.

== Geography ==
Darjeeling
TE: tea estate, F: facility, T: religious place, I: institute
Abbreviations used in names – TE for Tea Estate
Owing to space constraints in the small map, the actual locations in a larger map may vary slightly
All places marked in the map are linked in the larger full screen map

=== Location ===
Lebong & Mineral Spring Tea Garden is located at 27.04262°N 88.29951°E.

== Demographics ==
According to the 2011 Census of India, Lebong & Mineral Spring Tea Garden had a total population of 6,236 of which 3.184 (51%) were males and 3,052 (49%) were females. There were 551 persons in the age range of 0 to 6 years. The total number of literate people in Lebong & Mineral Springs Tea Garden was 4,856 (76.76% of the population over 6 years).

== The closed tea garden ==
Established in 1842, by Harrisons Tea Company, the tea garden was large by Darjeeling standards. It had 1,200 workers. In its last registration as Lebong and Mineral Springs Co. Ltd., it had a total area of 575 acres (233 ha). During World War II and the early years of independence Darjeeling tea gardens faced numerous difficulties. At the same time, the workers continued to be exploited and neglected. They had no say in affairs of the company and many of the workers even did not understand what was happening. When tea gardens were sold, they went along with it, to the new owners. The trade unions appeared on the Darjeeling scenario: The Communist Party of India, under the leadership of Ratanlal Brahmin and Bhadra Bahadur Hamal made their presence felt at Lebong and Mineral Springs in 1942. The issue they raised was for a daily wage of 8 annas (or half a rupee). The Gorkha League and the Congress joined in 1948 and 1949 respectively. Lebong and Mineral Springs faced three closures: 1952–53, 1955–56, 1957–60. Thereafter, there have been clashes, land grabbing, sale of tea leaves to other gardens, alternative forms of agriculture and many other experimentation, but Lebong and Mineral Springs has never again functioned properly. The effort has been to organise other means of livelihood for the workers.
