= Arvind Singhal =

Indian journalist

Arvind Kumar Singhal is a columnist for Business Standard (a financial news daily in India) who regularly wrote the column, Marketmind appearing on alternate Thursdays. The column has been in circulation for 7 years and focuses on the pulse of the market in India.

Mr. Singhal is also the Managing Director of Technopak, a management consulting firm based out of Gurgaon.

== Education ==
Mr. Singhal has done his bachelor's from University of Roorkee (Now IIT Roorkee) and his master's from UCLA, after which he worked DCM Group, VXL India and Modern suitings before founding Technopak in 1991.
