= Singla =

Singla is a Baniya surname. People with this surname include:

- Antoñita Singla (born 1948), Spanish dancer
- Arun Singla (born 1970), Indian cricketer
- Makhan Lal Singla (born 1949), Indian politician
- Sarup Chand Singla (born 1961), Indian politician and businessman
- Sudhir Singla, Indian politician
- Vijay Inder Singla (born 1971), Indian politician

Other uses of Singla are:

- Singla Tea Garden, a village in Darjeeling district, West Bengal, India
