= Bijanbari =

- Town
- Location in West Bengal, India
- Coordinates: 27.0702°N 88.1918°E
- Country: India
- State: West Bengal
- District: Darjeeling
- Elevation: 760 m (2,490 ft)

Languages
  - Official: Nepali, English
- Time zone: UTC+5:30 (IST)
- Lok Sabha constituency: Darjeeling
- Vidhan Sabha constituency: Darjeeling

Bijanbari is a small town in Darjeeling district with Darjeeling Pulbazar CD block being the headquarters of the Darjeeling Sadar subdivision in West Bengal, India. It contains the Block Divisional Office and the Hydel Power Plant. It is 1.5 hours away from Darjeeling.

On 22 October 2011, the Bijanbari wooden suspension bridge over the river collapsed. 32 people were killed, and more than 100 were injured. In 2013, a new concrete bridge was opened.

== Geography ==
Places and tea estates in the north-western portion of Darjeeling Sadar subdivision (including Darjeeling Pulbazar CD block) in Darjeeling district
CT: census town, R: rural/ urban centre, N: neighbourhood, H: hill centre, NP: national park/ wildlife sanctuary, TE: tea estate, TA: tourist attraction
Abbreviations used in names – TG for Tea Garden (town/village), TE for Tea Estate
Owing to space constraints in the small map, the actual locations in a larger map may vary slightly

=== Location ===
Bijanbari is located at 27.0702°N 88.1918°E

Bijanbari lies in a valley at an altitude of 760 m above sea level. The Little Rangeet River (Chota Rangeet) flows near the town. In 2011, a bridge over the river collapsed. 33 people died and several were injured.

=== Area overview ===
The map alongside shows the northern portion of the Darjeeling Himalayan hill region. Kangchenjunga, which rises with an elevation of 8,586 metres (28,169 ft) is located further north of the area shown. Sandakphu, rising to a height of 3,665 metres (12,024 ft), on the Singalila Ridge, is the highest point in West Bengal. In Darjeeling Sadar subdivision 61% of the total population lives in the rural areas and 39% of the population lives in the urban areas. There are 78 tea gardens/ estates (the figure varies slightly according to different sources), producing and largely exporting Darjeeling tea in the district. It engages a large proportion of the population directly/ indirectly. Some tea gardens were identified in the 2011 census as census towns or villages. Such places are marked in the map as CT (census town) or R (rural/ urban centre). Specific tea estate pages are marked TE.

Note: The map alongside presents some of the notable locations in the subdivision. All places marked in the map are linked in the larger full screen map.

== Civic administration ==
=== Police station ===
Pulbazar police station is shown as being located in Bijanbari mouza in the map of Darjeeling Pulbazar CD block on page 121 of District Census Handbook, Darjeeling.

Pullbazar police station has jurisdiction over the Darjeeling Pulbazar CD block.

=== CD block HQ ===
The headquarters of the Darjeeling Pulbazar CD block is at Bijanbari.

== Demographics ==
According to the 2011 Census of India, Bijanbari had a total population of 5,338 of which 2,685 (50%) were males and 2,653 (50%) were females. There were 514 persons in the age range of 0 to 6 years. The total number of literate people in Bijanbari was 4,156 (77.86% of the population over 6 years).

== Agriculture ==
Agriculture is the main industry in Bijanbari and the surrounding areas. The valley produces potatoes, cardamom, rice, maize, millets, peas, beans, squash, cauliflower, cabbages, tomatoes and oranges.

== Education ==
Bijanbari Degree College was established in 1995. Affiliated with the University of North Bengal, it offers honours courses in Nepali, English, political science and history and a general course in arts.

Bijanbari has three private schools, Little Rangit, Saptarshi Academy and Vidya Jyoti and a government-run school up to the 12th standard (Vidyasagar Higher Secondary School).

== Healthcare ==
Bijanbari Rural Hospital, with 30 beds, is the major government medical facility in the Darjeeling Pulbazar CD block. It is degraded due to negligence of party in power. Healthcare which is must for any region meanwhile here it doesn't have many doctors .
