= North Tukvar Tea Estate =

Indian tea garden

- Interactive map of North Tukvar Tea Estate
- Location: Darjeeling district, West Bengal, India
- Coordinates: 27.0962°N 88.2675°E
- Area: 195 ha (480 acres)
- Elevation: 1,500 to 2,800 feet (460 to 850 m)
- Owner: Jay Shree Tea & Industries Ltd.
- Open: 1852

North Tukvar Tea Estate (also known as Singla Tea Estate) is a tea garden in the Darjeeling Pulbazar CD block in the Darjeeling Sadar subdivision of the Darjeeling district in the Indian state of West Bengal.

== History ==
Established in 1852, it was one of the first tea gardens during the British period. Started on an experimental basis, it started producing commercially in 1856. Jay Shree Tea and Industries acquired it in 1995.

== Geography ==
Places and tea estates in the north-western portion of Darjeeling Sadar subdivision (including Darjeeling Pulbazar CD block) in Darjeeling district
CT: census town, R: rural/ urban centre, N: neighbourhood, H: hill centre, NP: national park/ wildlife sanctuary, TE: tea estate, TA: tourist attraction
Abbreviations used in names – TG for Tea Garden (town/village), TE for Tea Estate
Owing to space constraints in the small map, the actual locations in a larger map may vary slightly

It is 16 km from Darjeeling and 7 km from Jorethang.

Out of the total area of 195 hectares, tea plantations cover 187 hectares.

It is located at an altitude of 1,500 to 2,800 feet (460 to 850 m).

Note: The map alongside presents some of the notable locations in the subdivision. All places marked in the map are linked in the larger full screen map.

== Achievements ==
North Tukvar Tea Estate produces the best quality first flush Darjeeling tea.

As the garden is in a rain shadow area, it uses sprinkler irrigation system operated by gravitational force that covers 75% of the garden. It has a nursery, timber and bamboo forest.

North Tukvar Tea Estate has Fair Trade certification, ISO 1901:2008 awarded by TUV NORD and also HAACCP Today.

== Jay Shree Tea ==
Incorporated in 1945, Jay Shree Tea and Manufacturing Ltd. is the third largest tea producer in the world with 22 tea estates spread across India and East Africa. Other tea estates of Jay Shree Tea in Darjeeling are: Rishihat, Sungma, Puttabong, Singbulli and Balasun.
