= Avongrove Tea Estate =

Tea garden in West Bengal, India

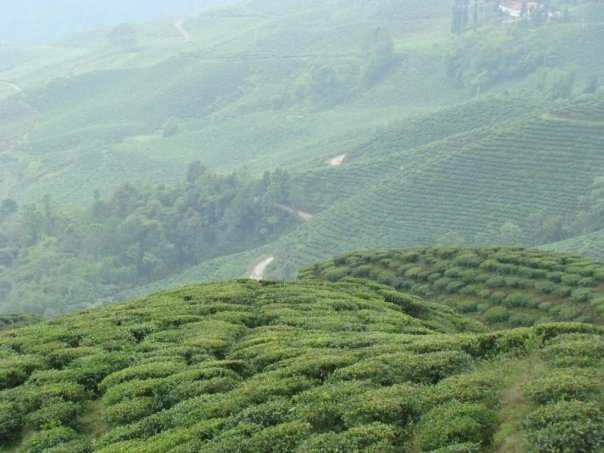
- Avongrove Tea Estate: Tea bushes maintain the contours of the hills
- Interactive map of Avongrove Tea Estate
- Location: Darjeeling district, West Bengal, India
- Coordinates: 26.9388°N 88.2108°E
- Area: 200 ha (490 acres)
- Elevation: 670 to 1,700 m (2,200 to 5,580 ft)
- Open: 1889
- Website: www.avongrovetea.com

Avongrove Tea Estate is a tea garden in the Mirik CD block in the Mirik subdivision of the Darjeeling district in West Bengal, India.

== Geography ==
Places and tea estates in the southern portion of Darjeeling Sadar subdivision (including Jorebunglow Sukhiapokhri CD block), and Mirik Subdivision in Darjeeling district
CT: census town, R: rural/ urban centre, NP: national park/ wildlife sanctuary, TE: tea estate
Abbreviations used in names – TG for Tea Garden (town/village), TE for Tea Estate
Owing to space constraints in the small map, the actual locations in a larger map may vary slightly

Avongrove Tea Estate, located in the Rangbhang Valley, sits on the banks of the Balason River at 670 m (2,200 ft) feet above sea level. This high-elevation estate goes up to 1,700 m (5,600 ft). Approximately 200 ha (490 acres) of land is growing tea, and there are 500 workers who live on the estate to maintain optimal plucking rounds. Avongrove means "Nest of Birds".

Avongrove is certified as an organic tea estate under USA (USA), JAS (Japan), NOP and NPOP (India and the EU).

Note: The map alongside presents some of the notable locations in the subdivision. All places marked in the map are linked in the larger full screen map.

== Production ==
The factory was built in 1889 and produces 60,000 to 70,000 kg (130,000 to 150,000 lb) of tea a year. The estate has a perennial source of water and almost the entire area under tea can be irrigated.

== Economy ==
Approximately 60% of the area under tea has chinary and chinary clonal bushes. Of the 40% that remains, about 20% are hybrid bushes and a very small percentage are pure Assam tea.

Avongrove offers a range of specialty Darjeeling tea, such as the peony rosette and florette, the latter of which expands when allowed to gently brew in a tall container, revealing a flower when the hot water makes the outer leaves unfurl. One woman, working an entire day, can make only six of them.

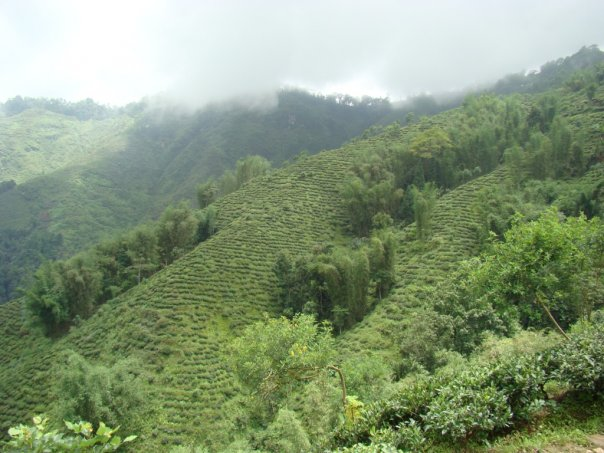
Avongrove Tea estate
