= Balasun Tea Estate =

Indian tea garden

- Interactive map of Balasun Tea Estate
- Location: Darjeeling district, West Bengal, India
- Coordinates: 26.8606°N 88.2357°E
- Area: 181.38 hectares (448.2 acres)
- Elevation: 365 to 1,375 metres (1,198 to 4,511 ft)
- Owner: Jay Shree Tea
- Open: 1871

Balasun Tea Estate is a tea garden in the Kurseong CD block in the Kurseong subdivision of the Darjeeling district in the Indian state of West Bengal.

== History ==
It was started in 1871 by Devenport & Company Limited as Nahore Balasun Tea Estate. It was renamed Balasun Tea Estate after the Balason that flows past the tea estate. In 1963, it was taken over by the Darjeeling Consolidated Tea Company Limited of the Bajoria Group. Jay Shree Tea & Industries Ltd. took it over in 2005.

== Geography ==
Places and tea estates in the north-eastern portion of Darjeeling Sadar subdivision (including Rangli Rangliot CD block) and Kurseong subdivision in Darjeeling district
CT: census town, R: rural/ urban centre, N: neighbourhood, H: hill centre, NP: national park/ wildlife sanctuary, TE: tea estate, TA: tourist attraction
Abbreviations used in names – TG for Tea Garden (town/village), TE for Tea Estate
Owing to space constraints in the small map, the actual locations in a larger map may vary slightly

=== The garden ===
Balasun Tea Estate is located near Sonada.

The tea plantations cover 181.38 hectares (448.2 acres) and is spread over an altitude of 365 to 1,375 metres (1,198 to 4,511 ft) above mean sea level. Balasun Tea Estate is planted with 51% pure China, 40% hybrid Assam and 9% Darjeeling Quality Clonal variety.

Note: The map alongside presents some of the notable locations in the subdivision. All places marked in the map are linked in the larger full screen map.

== Economy ==
Balasun Tea Estate produces 100,000 kg organic Darjeeling tea annually.

It is Hazard Analysis & Critical Control Point (HACCP) certified by TUV-NORD, UTZ certified by IMO and SAN/ Rainforest Alliance certification from IMO and has Fair Trade certification from FLO-CERT.

The other tea gardens of the Jay Shree Tea & Industries Ltd., owned by the B.K.Birla group, in Darjeeling are: Puttabong (Tukvar) Tea Estate, Sungma Tea Garden, North Tukvar Tea Estate, Singbulli Tea Garden and Rishihat Tea Garden.
