= Darjeeling Pulbazar (community development block) =

- Community development block
- Coordinates: 27.0901543°N 88.2215881°E
- Country: India
- State: West Bengal
- District: Darjeeling

Area
  - Total: 416.00 km^{2} (160.62 sq mi)

Population (2011)
  - Total: 126,935
  - Density: 305.13/km^{2} (790.29/sq mi)
- Time zone: UTC+5:30 (IST)
- Lok Sabha constituency: Darjeeling
- Vidhan Sabha constituency: Darjeeling
- Website: darjeeling.gov.in

Darjeeling Pulbazar is a community development block (CD block) that forms an administrative division in the Darjeeling Sadar subdivision of the Darjeeling district in the Indian state of West Bengal.

== Geography ==
Pulbazar is located at 27°05′25″N 88°13′18″E.

The snow-clad mountain ranges, a little to the north of the old Darjeeling district, form the main Himalayan range. Ranges/ ridges branching out from the main Himalayas pass through Darjeeling district. To the north-west towers the giant Kangchenjunga 28,146 ft (8,579 m) and to the north-east is Dongkya 23,184 ft (7,066 m). From Kangchenjunga the Singalila Ridge slopes down southward forming the border between India and Nepal. Manebhanjyang, Sandakphu and Phalut are popular trekking destinations on this ridge. It continues south and south-east through Tunglu and Senchal and other spurs that form the Darjeeling Hills west of the Teesta. To the east of the Teesta, a lofty ridge runs south of Dongkya, bifurcating at Gipmochi 11,518 ft (3,511 m), forming two spurs that contain the valley of the Jaldhaka. The lower portion of this hilly region forms the Kalimpong Hills. Four great hill ranges radiate from a single point at Ghum, a saddle 7,372 ft (2,247 m) high – the first, the Ghum range running due west to Simanabasti; the second, the Senchal-Mahaldiram range sloping south towards Kurseong, the highest points being East Senchel 8,600 ft (2,600 m), Tiger Hill 8,515 ft (2,595 m) and West Senchel 8,163 ft (2,488 m); the third, the Takdah or Takbu range, sloping north-east to a point above the junction of the Great Rangit and Teesta; the fourth, the Darjeeling Jalapahar Range, extending northwards towards Darjeeling.

Darjeeling Pulbazar CD block is part of the Darjeeling Himalayas physiographic region. This region is highest in elevation and covers the northernmost part of the district. The Singalila Ridge, the highest mountain range in the district and the state, is part of this region. Sandakphu 11,929 ft (3,636 m) and Phalut 11,800 ft (3,600 m) are the highest points in West Bengal.

The Rammam River flows along the northern border with Sikkim covering both Darjeeling Pulbazar and Rangli Rangliot CD blocks, before it joins the Teesta.

Singalila National Park on the Singalila Ridge is spread over 78.6 km^{2}at a height ranging from 7,900 ft (2,400 m) to 12,000 ft (3,700 m).

Darjeeling Pulbazar CD block is bounded by the West Sikkim district and South Sikkim district of Sikkim on the north, Rangli Rangliot CD block on the east, Jorebunglow Sukhiapokhri CD block on the south and Taplejung District of Province No. 1 of Nepal on the west.

The Darjeeling Pulbazar CD block has an area of 416.00 km^{2}. It has 1 panchayat samity, 23 gram panchayats, 241 gram sansads (village councils), 46 mouzas, 43 inhabited villages and 4 census towns. Pulbazar and Lodhoma police station serve this block. Headquarters of this CD block is at Bijanbari.

Gram panchayats in Darjeeling Pulbazar CD block are: Badamtam, Bijanbari-Pulbazar, Chungtong, Dadaipani, Darjeeling I, Darjeeling II, Goke I, Goke II, Jhepi, Kaijalia, Lebong Valley I, Lebong Valley II, Lodhoma I, Lodhoma II, Mazua, Nayanor, Rangit I, Rangit II, Relling, Rimbik, Singtamin Soom and Sirikhola-Daragaon.

== Demographics ==
=== Population ===
According to the 2011 Census of India, the Darjeeling Pulbazar CD block had a total population of 126,935, of which 105,150 were rural and 21,785 were urban. There were 63,828 (50%) males and 63,107 (50%) females. There were 11,696 persons in the age range of 0 to 6 years. The Scheduled Castes numbered 5,863 (4.62%) and the Scheduled Tribes numbered 36,563 (28.80%).

Census towns in the Darjeeling Pulbazar CD block are (2011 census figures in brackets): Badamtam Tea Garden (6,102), Ging Tea Garden (4,089), Chongtong Tea Garden (5,802) and Singtam Tea Garden (5,792).

Large villages (with 4,000+ population) in the Darjeeling Pulbazar CD block are (2011 census figures in brackets): Rimbic (6,980), Kaijalia (4,150), Goke (9,100), Bijanbari (5,338), Tukvar Tea Garden (4,791) and Lebong & Mineral Spring Tea Garden (6,236).

Other villages in the Darjeeling Pulbazar CD block include (2011 census figures in brackets): Pattabong Tea Garden (2,347), Lodhoma (703), Lebong Tea Garden (2,276), Relling (3,568), Jhepi (1,576), Majua (1,164), Rungneet Tea Garden (1,252), Singla Tea Garden (3,400), Phubsering Tea Garden (3,208), Soom Tea Garden (3,578), Bloomfield Tea Garden (2,901) and Rishihat Tea Garden (1,651).

=== Literacy ===
According to the 2011 census the total number of literate persons in the Darjeeling Pulbazar CD block was 93,091 (80.78% of the population over 6 years) out of which males numbered 50,630 (87.61% of the male population over 6 years) and females numbered 42,461 (73.91% of the female population over 6 years). The gender disparity (the difference between female and male literacy rates) was 13.69%.

See also – List of West Bengal districts ranked by literacy rate

Literacy in CD blocks of
Darjeeling district (2011)
Darjeeling Sadar subdivision
Darjeeling Pulbazar – 80.78%
Rangli Rangliot – 80.50%
Jorebunglow Sukhiapokhri – 82.54%
Kalimpong subdivision
Kalimpong I – 81.43%
Kalimpong II – 79.68%
Gorubathan – 76.88%
Kurseong subdivision
Kurseong – 81.15%
Mirik subdivision
Mirik – 80.84%
Siliguri subdivision
Matigara – 74.78%
Naxalbari – 75.47%
Phansidewa – 64.46%
Kharibari – 67.37%
2011 Census: CD Block Wise

Primary Census Abstract Data

=== Language and religion ===
Religion in Darjeeling Pulbazar CD block (2011)
Hinduism	65.52%
Buddhism	19.47%
Christianity	9.37%
Kirat Mundhum	4.86%
Islam	0.45%
Other or not stated	0.33%

In the 2011 census, Hindus numbered 83,166 and formed 65.52% of the population in the Darjeeling Pulbazar CD block. Buddhists numbered 24,712 and formed 19.47% of the population. Christians numbered 1,1897 and formed 9.37% of the population. Muslims numbered 569 and formed 0.45% of the population. Others numbered 6,541 and formed 5.19% of the population.

Languages of Darjeeling Pulbazar CD block (2011)
1. Nepali (96.7%)
2. Bhotia (1.16%)
3. Others (2.13%)

Nepali is the predominant language, with 96.71% of the population. Various Bhotia dialects are spoken by 1.17% of the population.

The West Bengal Official Language Act 1961 declared that Bengali and Nepali were to be used for official purposes in the three hill subdivisions of Darjeeling, Kalimpong and Kurseong in Darjeeling district.

== Rural poverty ==
According to the Rural Household Survey in 2005, 24.40% of the total number of families were BPL families in the Darjeeling district. According to a World Bank report, as of 2012, 4-9% of the population in Darjeeling, North 24 Parganas and South 24 Parganas districts were below poverty level, the lowest among the districts of West Bengal, which had an average 20% of the population below poverty line.

== Economy ==
=== Livelihood ===
Livelihood
in Darjeeling Pulbazar CD block
1. Cultivators (32.6%)
2. Agricultural labourers (11.7%)
3. Household industries (3.60%)
4. Other Workers (52.2%)

In the Darjeeling Pulbazar CD block in 2011, among the class of total workers, cultivators numbered 17,048 and formed 32.56%, agricultural labourers numbered 6,107 and formed 11.66%, household industry workers numbered 1,884 and formed 3.60% and other workers numbered 27,317 and formed 52.18%. Total workers numbered 52,356 and formed 41.25% of the total population, and non-workers numbered 74,579 and formed 58.75% of the population.

Note: In the census records a person is considered a cultivator, if the person is engaged in cultivation/ supervision of land owned by self/government/institution. When a person who works on another person's land for wages in cash or kind or share, is regarded as an agricultural labourer. Household industry is defined as an industry conducted by one or more members of the family within the household or village, and one that does not qualify for registration as a factory under the Factories Act. Other workers are persons engaged in some economic activity other than cultivators, agricultural labourers and household workers. It includes factory, mining, plantation, transport and office workers, those engaged in business and commerce, teachers, entertainment artistes and so on.

=== Infrastructure ===
There are 43 inhabited villages in the Darjeeling Pulbazar CD block, as per the District Census Handbook, Darjiling, 2011. 100% villages have power supply. 100% villages have drinking water supply. 25 villages (58.14%) have post offices. 41 villages (95.35%) have telephones (including landlines, public call offices and mobile phones). 27 villages (62.79%) have pucca (paved) approach roads and 6 villages (13.95%) have transport communication (includes bus service, rail facility and navigable waterways). 8 villages (18.60%) have agricultural credit societies and 5 villages (11.63%) have banks.

=== Agriculture ===
In 2012–13, there were 6 fertiliser depots, 5 seed stores and 149 fair price shops in Darjeeling Pulbazar CD block.

In 2013–14, Darjeeling Pulbazar CD block produced 1,314 tonnes of Aman paddy, the main winter crop, from 687 hectares, 7 tonnes of Aus paddy (summer crop) from 5 hectares, 35 tonnes of wheat from 31 hectares, 1,859 tonnes of maize from 752 hectares and 9,914 tonnes of potatoes from 909 hectares. It also produced pulses and oilseeds.

=== Tea gardens ===
Darjeeling tea "received the iconic status due to its significant aroma, taste and colour... the first Indian product to be marked with the Geographical Indication (GI) tag in 2003... As per the definition, "Darjeeling Tea" can only refer to tea that has been cultivated, grown, produced, manufactured and processed in tea gardens in few specific hilly areas of the district." Apart from the hill areas, tea is also grown in the plain areas of the terai and dooars, but such gardens are not covered under the GI tag.

As of 2009–10, there were 87 tea gardens covered under the GI tag, employing 51,091 persons. Total land under cultivation was 17,828.38 hectares and total production was 7.36 million kg. A much larger population is indirectly dependent on the tea industry in the district. The average annual production including those from the plain areas, exceeds 10 million kg.

As of 2013, Darjeeling subdivision had 46 tea estates, Kalimpong subdivision had 29 tea estates and Kurseong subdivision had 6 tea gardens. This added up to 81 tea estates in the hill areas. Bannackburn Tea Estate and Lingia Tea Estate in Darjeeling were the first to come up in 1835. Siliguri subdivision in the terai region had 45 tea estates.

=== Banking ===
In 2012–13, Darjeeling Pulbazar CD block had offices of 2 commercial banks and 1 gramin bank.

== Transport ==
Darjeeling Pulbazar CD block has 2 originating/ terminating bus routes. The nearest railway station is 29 km from the block headquarters.

National Highway 110 /Hill Cart Road passes through Darjeeling Pulbazar CD block.

== Education ==
In 2012–13, Darjeeling Pulbazar CD block had 195 primary schools with 11,527 students, 9 middle schools with 2,488 students, 6 high schools with 2,122 students and 2 higher secondary schools with 1,647 students. Darjeeling Pulbazar CD block had 1 general degree college with 567 students and 386 institutions for special and non-formal education with 9,451 students. Darjeeling municipal area (outside the CD block) had 3 general degree colleges with 5,564 students and 6 technical/ professional institutions with 1,095 students.

See also – Education in India

According to the 2011 census, in Darjeeling Pulbazar CD block, among the 43 inhabited villages, 1 village did not have a school, 29 villages had two or more primary schools, 12 villages had at least 1 primary and 1 middle school and 16 villages had at least 1 middle and 1 secondary school.

Bijanbari Degree College was established at Bijanbari in 1995.

== Healthcare ==
In 2013, Darjeeling Pulbazar CD block had 1 rural hospital and 1 primary health centre with total 40 beds and 2 doctors (excluding private bodies). It had 32 family welfare subcentres. 1,887 patients were treated indoor and 24,712 patients were treated outdoor in the hospitals, health centres and subcentres of the CD block.

Bijanbari Rural Hospital, with 30 beds at Bijanbari, is the major government medical facility in the Darjeeling Pulbazar CD block. There is a primary health centre at Lodhoma (with 10 beds).
