= Phoobsering Tea Estate =

Tea harvesting area in Darjeeling, West Bengal, India

- Interactive map of Phoobsering Tea Estate
- Location: Darjeeling district, West Bengal, India
- Coordinates: 27.0801°N 88.2726°E
- Area: 240 hectares (590 acres)
- Elevation: 3,000 to 6,000 feet (910 to 1,830 m)
- Owner: Chamong Group
- Open: 1856–1860

Phoobsering Tea Estate is a tea garden in the Darjeeling Pulbazar in the Darjeeling Sadar subdivision of the Darjeeling district in the Indian state of West Bengal.

== Geography ==
Places and tea estates in the north-western portion of Darjeeling Sadar subdivision (including Darjeeling Pulbazar CD block) in Darjeeling district
CT: census town, R: rural/ urban centre, N: neighbourhood, H: hill centre, NP: national park/ wildlife sanctuary, TE: tea estate, TA: tourist attraction
Abbreviations used in names – TG for Tea Garden (town/village), TE for Tea Estate
Owing to space constraints in the small map, the actual locations in a larger map may vary slightly

== Etymology ==
The tea estate derives its name from a Sikkimese local 'Phurpu Tshering'. Tshering was born on a Thursday (Phurpu), it being common practice to name Bhutia children after the day on which they are born. Some articles have also referred to Phurbu as a Lepcha, this may be due to his common share of genealogy with Chebu Lama. O' Malleys Gazetteer offers the fact that Phurbu Diwan was a brother of Cheebu Lama (Astrologer Lama). "Subsequently, on his death, this tract was leased jointly to Rechuk Dewan the son of CL, Pharbu Diwan, his brother and Raja Tenduk Pulger, his nephew and adopted son."

A more recent detailed study on the topic "Flighty Subjects: Sovereignty, Shifting Cultivators, and the State in Darjeeling, 1830-1856" by Catherine Warner offers us insights into the genealogy of CL. In the article, Campbell (Campbell 1869) acknowledges that CL's mother was a 'Lepcha' and his father a Bhutia (Tibeto-Sikkimese), contrary to other claims that CL was a Lepcha (Hooker 1854;Risley 1894). "Since descent was often determined by the father’s side of the family (thus the Namgyals could marry Limbu and Lepcha wives, for example, without producing Limbu or Lepcha children), and Chebu Lama’s father was not, as mentioned, a Lepcha, he probably retained the option of identifying with Tibeto-Sikkimese circles."

R.K.Sprigg in his article titled '1826: The end of an era in the Social and political history of Sikkim' states that his "wife's grandfather, David Macdonald, claimed that the Cheeboo Lama's brother Phup (or Phurbu) Tshering (after whom one of Darjeeling's oldest tea-gardens is named) was his maternal grandfather".

== The Tea Estate ==
It is one of the oldest plantations in the Darjeeling West valley. It is spread over 510 hectares of land. Phoobsering tea estate was established by the Darjeeling Tea Company in the 1856-1860 along with Ging, Takdah and Ambootia. Phoobsering tea of the Oolong variety is prized all over the world for its taste.
