= Darjeeling Sadar subdivision =

- Subdivision
- Coordinates: 27.03°N 88.16°E
- Country: India
- State: West Bengal
- District: Darjeeling
- Headquarters: Darjeeling

Languages
  - Official: Bengali, Nepali
- Time zone: UTC+5:30 (IST)

Darjeeling Sadar subdivision is a subdivision of the Darjeeling district in the state of West Bengal, India.

== Subdivisions ==
Darjeeling district is divided into the following administrative subdivisions:

| Subdivision | Headquarters | Area km^{2} | Population (2011) | Rural Population % (2011) | Urban Population % (2011) |
|---|---|---|---|---|---|
| Darjeeling Sadar | Darjeeling | 921.6 | 429,391 | 61.00 | 39.00 |
| Kurseong | Kurseong | 377.35 | 136,793 | 58.41 | 41.59 |
| Mirik | Mirik | 125.68 | 57,887 | 80.11 | 19.89 |
| Siliguri | Siliguri | 802.01 | 971,120 | 55.11 | 44.89 |
| Darjeeling district | Darjeeling | 2,226.72 | 1,595,191 | 57.89 | 42.11 |

Places and tea estates in the north-western portion of Darjeeling Sadar subdivision (including Darjeeling Pulbazar CD block) in Darjeeling district
CT: census town, R: rural/ urban centre, N: neighbourhood, H: hill centre, NP: national park/ wildlife sanctuary, TE: tea estate, TA: tourist attraction
Abbreviations used in names – TG for Tea Garden (town/village), TE for Tea Estate
Owing to space constraints in the small map, the actual locations in a larger map may vary slightly
Places and tea estates in the southern portion of Darjeeling Sadar subdivision (including Jorebunglow Sukhiapokhri CD block), and Mirik Subdivision in Darjeeling district
CT: census town, R: rural/ urban centre, NP: national park/ wildlife sanctuary, TE: tea estate
Abbreviations used in names – TG for Tea Garden (town/village), TE for Tea Estate
Owing to space constraints in the small map, the actual locations in a larger map may vary slightly
Places and tea estates in the north-eastern portion of Darjeeling Sadar subdivision (including Rangli Rangliot CD block) and Kurseong subdivision in Darjeeling district
CT: census town, R: rural/ urban centre, N: neighbourhood, H: hill centre, NP: national park/ wildlife sanctuary, TE: tea estate, TA: tourist attraction
Abbreviations used in names – TG for Tea Garden (town/village), TE for Tea Estate
Owing to space constraints in the small map, the actual locations in a larger map may vary slightly

== Police stations ==
Police stations in the Darjeeling Sadar subdivision have the following features and jurisdiction:

| Police Station | Area covered km^{2} | International border | Inter-state border km | Municipal Town | CD block |
|---|---|---|---|---|---|
| Darjeeling Sadar | n/a | - | - | Darjeeling | - |
| Pulbazar | n/a | * | ** | - | Darjeeling Pulbazar |
| Lodhoma | n/a | * | ** | - | Darjeeling Pulbazar |
| Jorebungalow | n/a | * | ** | - | Jorebunglow Sukhiapokhri |
| Sukhiapokhri | n/a | * | ** | - | Jorebunglow Sukhiapokhri |
| Rangli Rangliot | n/a | - | ** | - | Rangli Rangliot |

.* The total length of border with Nepal (Mechi River) is 101.02 km (62.77 mi)

.**The total length of border with Sikkim (Rangit, Teesta and Rangpo Rivers) is 54.33 km (33.76 mi)

== Gram Panchayats ==
Gram panchayats in Darjeeling Sadar subdivision are :

- Darjeeling Pulbazar block has 23 gram panchayats, viz. Darjeeling-I, Darjeeling-II, Bijanbari-Pulbazar, Goke-I, Goke-II, Kaijalia, Nayanor, Singtam Soom, Lodhoma-I, Lodhoma-II, Relling, Chungtong, Rimbik, Rishirhat-Bloomfield, Rangit-I, Rangit-II, Lebong Valley-I, Lebong Valley-II, Dabaipani, Badamtam, Sirikhola-Daragaon, Jhepi and Mazuwa.
- Jorebunglow Sukiapokhri block has 16 gram panchayats, viz. Lower Sonada-I, Lower Sonada-II, Upper Sonada, Rangbul, Lingia Maraybong, Dhootria Kalej Valley, Munda Kothi, Rangbhang Gopaldhara, Pokhriabong-I, Pokhriabong-II, Pokhriabong-III, Permaguri Tamsang, Gorabari Margaret's Hope, Plungdung, Ghum Khasmahal, and Sukhia-Simana.
- Rangli Rangliot block consists of rural areas only with 11 gram panchayats, viz. Rangli, Takdah, Labdah, Maneydara, Tackling-I, Tackling-II, Lamahatta, Pubang-Rampuria, Singrimtam, Ressep and Rongchong.

== Blocks ==
Community development blocks in Darjeeling Sadar subdivision are:

| CD block | Headquarters | Area km^{2} | Pop- ulation (2011) | SC % | ST % | Literacy Rate % | CT# |
|---|---|---|---|---|---|---|---|
| Darjeeling; Pulbazar | Bijanbari | 416.00 | 126,935 | 4.62 | 28.80 | 80.78 | 4 |
| Jorebunglow; Sukhiapokhri | Sukhiapokhri | 222.12 | 113,516 | 5.65 | 30.03 | 82.54 | 4 |
| Rangli; Rangliot | Takdah | 272.99 | 70.125 | 5.55 | 33.07 | 80.50 | - |

== Education ==
=== Educational institutions ===
The following institutions are located in Darjeeling Sadar subdivision:

- St Joseph's College, Darjeeling, a Jesuit institution, established in 1927 at Darjeeling.
- Southfield College, was founded as Loreto College in 1961, at Darjeeling.
- Darjeeling Government College was established in 1948 at Darjeeling.
- Salesian College was established at Sonada in 1933.
- Sonada Degree College was established at Sonada in 1985.
- Bijanbari Degree College was established in 1995 at Bijanbari.
- Ghoom Jorebunglow College was established in 2004 at Ghum.
- Darjeeling Hill Institute of Technology and Management was established in August 2025 at Takdah.

=== Overview ===
Data in the table below presents a comprehensive picture of the education scenario in Darjeeling district, with data for the year 2012–13.

| Subdivision | Primary School | | Middle School | | High School | | Higher Secondary School | | General College, Univ | | Technical / Professional Instt | | Non-formal Education | |
| Subdivision | Institution | Student | Institution | Student | Institution | Student | Institution | Student | Institution | Student | Institution | Student | Institution | Student |
|---|---|---|---|---|---|---|---|---|---|---|---|---|---|---|
| Darjeeling Sadar | 579 | 37,345 | 28 | 8,019 | 37 | 22,579 | 23 | 16,492 | 7 | 9,510 | 6 | 1,095 | 1,142 | 28,425 |
| Kurseong | 218 | 13,031 | 3 | 721 | 28 | 10,596 | 9 | 7,783 | 1 | 2,034 | 4 | 866 | 367 | 14,261 |
| Mirik | 78 | 7,211 | 3 | 919 | 6 | 2,131 | 2 | 2,127 | 1 | 715 | - | - | 309 | 20,265 |
| Siliguri | 676 | 79,713 | 30 | 8,585 | 46 | 23,903 | 67 | 100,845 | 10 | 13,398 | 13 | 3,161 | 1,793 | 96,766 |
| Darjeeling district | 1,551 | 137,300 | 64 | 18,244 | 117 | 59,290 | 101 | 127,247 | 19 | 25,657 | 23 | 5,122 | 3,611 | 159,717 |

Note: Primary schools include junior basic schools; middle schools, high schools and higher secondary schools include madrasahs; technical schools include junior technical schools, junior government polytechnics, industrial technical institutes, industrial training centres, nursing training institutes etc.; technical and professional colleges include engineering colleges, medical colleges, para-medical institutes, management colleges, teachers training and nursing training colleges, law colleges, art colleges, music colleges etc. Special and non-formal education centres include sishu siksha kendras, madhyamik siksha kendras, centres of Rabindra mukta vidyalaya, recognised Sanskrit tols, institutions for the blind and other handicapped persons, Anganwadi centres, reformatory schools etc.

== Healthcare ==
The table below (all data in numbers) presents an overview of the medical facilities available and patients treated in the hospitals, health centres and sub-centres in 2013 in Darjeeling district, with data for the year 2012–13.:

| Subdivision | Health & Family Welfare Deptt, WB | | | | Other State Govt Deptts | Local bodies | Central Govt Deptts / PSUs | NGO / Private Nursing Homes | Total | Total Number of Beds | Total Number of Doctors* | Indoor Patients | Outdoor Patients |
| Subdivision | Hospitals | Rural Hospitals | Block Primary Health Centres | Primary Health Centres | Other State Govt Deptts | Local bodies | Central Govt Deptts / PSUs | NGO / Private Nursing Homes | Total | Total Number of Beds | Total Number of Doctors* | Indoor Patients | Outdoor Patients |
|---|---|---|---|---|---|---|---|---|---|---|---|---|---|
| Darjeeling Sadar | 3 | 2 | 1 | 6 | 1 | - | - | 3 | 16 | 729 | 32 | 22,584 | 149,465 |
| Kurseong | 4 | 1 | - | 3 | - | - | 1 | - | 9 | 554 | 22 | 9,097 | 132,488 |
| Mirik | - | 1 | 0 | 3 | - | - | - | - | 4 | 42 | 44 | 2,354 | 57,243 |
| Siliguri | 3 | 3 | 1 | 4 | 1 | - | 4 | 47 | 63 | 1,146 | 168 | 133,086 | 1,738,671 |
| Darjeeling district | 10 | 7 | 2 | 16 | 2 | - | 5 | 50 | 92 | 2,471 | 266 | 167,121 | 1,738.671 |

.* Excluding nursing homes.

=== Medical facilities ===
Medical facilities in Darjeeling Sadar subdivision are as follows:

Hospitals: (Name, location, beds)

- Darjeeling District Hospital, Darjeeling M, 500 beds
- Darjeeling Jail Hospital, Darjeeling, 12 beds
- Darjeeling Maternity Hospital, Darjeeling, 50 beds
- Medicinal Plantation Hospital, Mangpoo, 16 beds

Rural Hospitals: (Name, CD block, location, beds)

- Bijanbari Rural Hospital, Darjeeling Pulbazar CD block, Bijanbari, 30 beds
- Takdah Rural Hospital, Rangli Rangliot CD block, Takdah, 30 beds

Block Primary Health Centres: (Name, CD block, location, beds)

- Sukhiapokhri Block Primary Health Centre, Jorebunglow Sukhiapokhri CD block, Sukhiapokhri, 25 beds

Primary Health Centres : (CD block-wise)(CD block, PHC location, beds)

- Darjeeling Pulbazar CD block:Lodhoma (10)
- Rangli Rangliot CD block: Singringtom (10), Takling (4)
- Jorebunglow Sukhiapokhri CD block: Ghum (6), Pokhriabong (2)

== Legislative segments ==
As per order of the Delimitation Commission in respect of the delimitation of constituencies in West Bengal, the area under Darjeeling municipality, Darjeeling Pulbazar block and eleven gram panchayats under Jorebunglow Sukiapokhri block, viz. Dhootria Kalej Valley, Ghum Khasmahal, Sukhia–Simana, Rangbhang Gopaldhara, Pokhriabong–I, Pokhriabong–II, Pokhriabong–III, Lingia Maraybong, Permaguri Tamsang, Plungdung and Rangbul constitutes the Darjeeling assembly constituency of West Bengal. The other five gram panchayats of Jorebunglow Sukiapokhri block, viz. Lower Sonada–I, Upper Sonada, Lower Sonada–II, Munda Kothi and Gorabari Margaret's Hope are part of Kurseong assembly constituency, along with the area under Rangli Rangliot block. Both assembly constituencies will be part of Darjeeling Lok Sabha constituency.
