= Matigara =

Matigara may refer to:

- Matigara (community development block), in Darjeeling district, West Bengal, India
- Matigara-Naxalbari, a Vidhan Sabha (assembly) constituency in Darjeeling district, West Bengal, India
- Matigara, Dhanbad, a census town in Baghmara (community development block) in Dhanbad district, Jharkhand, India
- Matigarahat, a village in Matigara (community development block), Darjeeling district, West Bengal, India
