= Poobong Tea Garden =

Poobong Tea Garden Chota Poobong
- Village
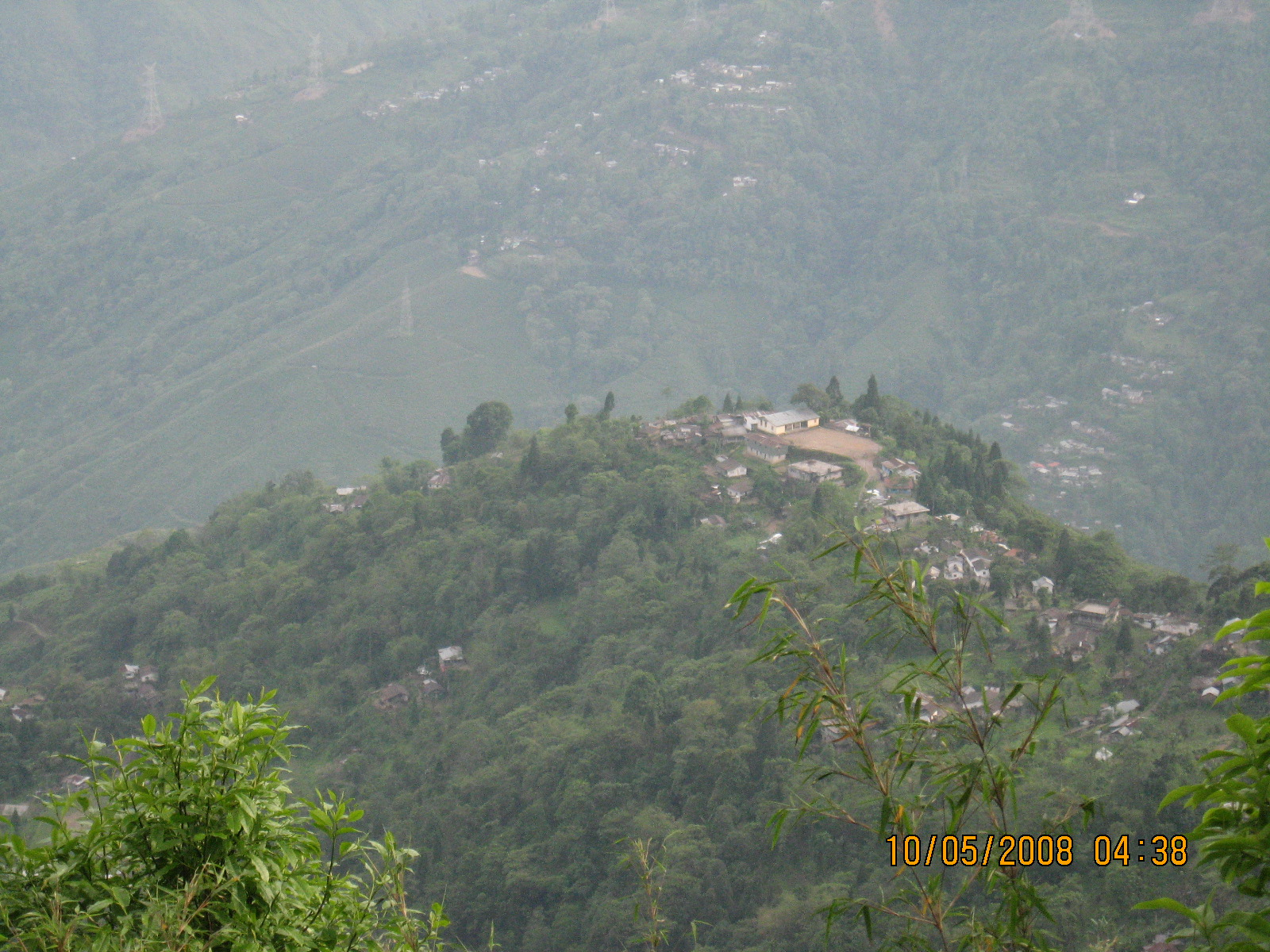

- Location in West Bengal, India Poobong Tea Garden (India)
- Coordinates: 26.998634°N 88.194305°E
- Country: India
- State: West Bengal
- District: Darjeeling
- Elevation: 1,520 m (4,990 ft)

Population (2011)
  - Total: 2,170

Languages
  - Official: Gorkhali, English
- Time zone: UTC+5:30 (IST)
- PIN: 734102
- Telephone code: 0091 354
- Vehicle registration: WB-
- Coastline: 0 kilometres (0 mi)
- Nearest city: Ghoom
- Sex ratio: 1;1 ♂/♀
- Literacy: 40%
- Avg. summer temperature: 25 °C (77 °F)
- Avg. winter temperature: 2 °C (36 °F)
- Website: facebook.com/chotapoobong?%2F

Poobong Tea Garden (also spelled Pubong) is a village in the Jorebunglow Sukhiapokhri CD block in the Darjeeling Sadar subdivision of the Darjeeling district in West Bengal, India.

== Etymology ==
Poobong means 'a valley behind the clouds'.

== History ==
Poobong Tea Estate was established in 1913.

== Geography ==
Places and tea estates in the southern portion of Darjeeling Sadar subdivision (including Jorebunglow Sukhiapokhri CD block), and Mirik Subdivision in Darjeeling district
CT: census town, R: rural/ urban centre, NP: national park/ wildlife sanctuary, TE: tea estate
Abbreviations used in names – TG for Tea Garden (town/village), TE for Tea Estate
Owing to space constraints in the small map, the actual locations in a larger map may vary slightly

=== Area overview ===
The map alongside shows a portion of the southern portion of the Darjeeling Himalayan hill region in the Darjeeling district. In the Darjeeling Sadar subdivision 61.00% of the total population lives in the rural areas and 39.00% of the population lives in the urban areas. In the Mirik subdivision 80.11% of the total population lives in rural areas and 19.89% lives in urban areas. There are 78 tea gardens/ estates (the figure varies slightly according to different sources), in the district, producing and largely exporting Darjeeling tea. It engages a large proportion of the population directly/ indirectly. Some tea gardens were identified in the 2011 census as census towns or villages. Such places are marked in the map as CT (census town) or R (rural/ urban centre). Specific tea estate pages are marked TE.

Note: The map alongside presents some of the notable locations in the subdivision. All places marked in the map are linked in the larger full screen map.

=== Location ===
Poobong, situated between Sukhiapokhri and Ghoom, is so small that it is often referred to as 'Chhota Poobong'. It is 8 km from Ghoom railway station and 13 km from Darjeeling. Darjeeling tea is produced in Poobong Tea Estate at a height varying from 3,000 to 5,000 ft (910 to 1,520 m).

From the main road it is around 3.5 km rough road down towards the village. The main sources of income of this place was/is working in the Tea Garden but some are engaged in agriculture and some go to work in different parts of India and abroad.

Poobong has two divisions: Tea estate and Busty. There are 4 primary schools, Chettri Goan Primary School, Poobong Kaman Primary School, Alubari Primary School and Poobong Fatak Primary School; one junior high school is in school Dara. For higher education one has to go to Ghoom, Sukhia, Darjeeling etc.

== Demographics ==
According to the 2011 Census of India, Pubong Tea Garden had a total population of 2,170 of which 1,098 (51%) were males and 1,072 (49%) were females. There were 165 persons in the age range of 0 to 6 years. The total number of literate people in Pubong Tea Garden was 1,660 (76.50% of the population over 6 years).

== Gallery ==
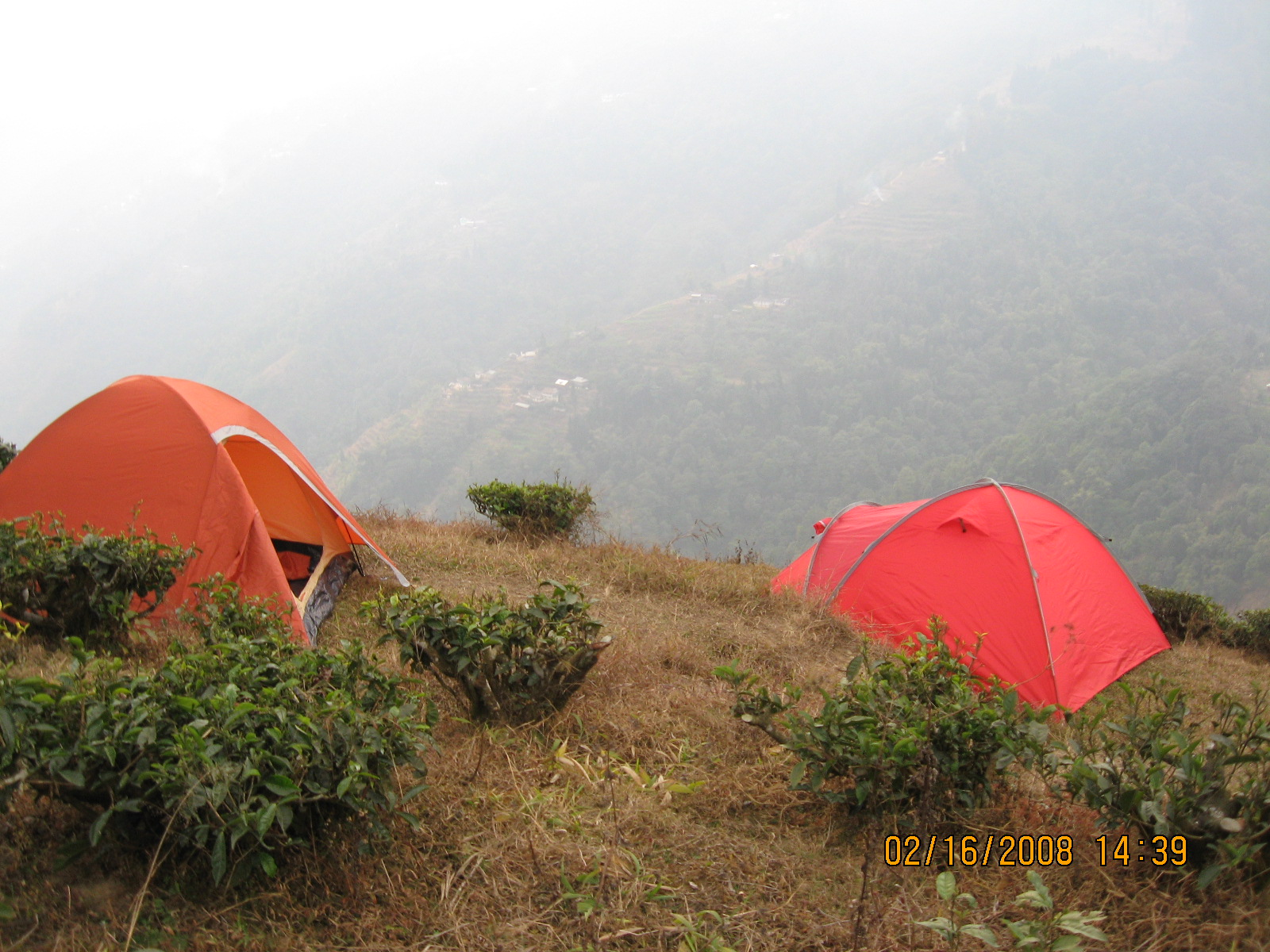
Tea Gardan

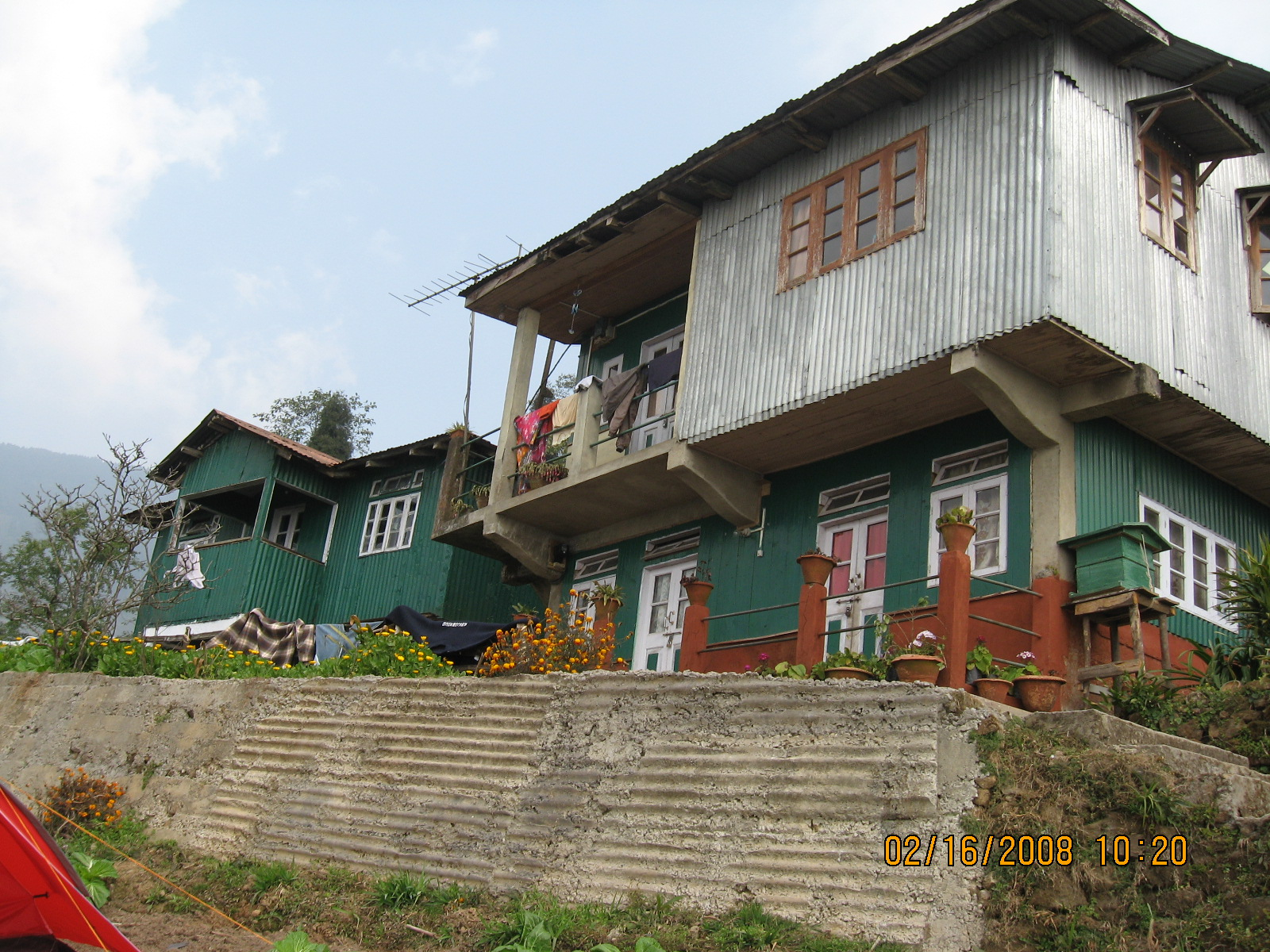
Local House

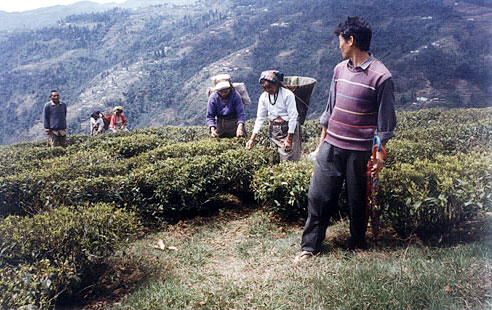
