= Kalkut, Siliguri =

Kalkut
- Census Town
- Location in West Bengal, India Kalkut (India)
- Coordinates: 26.762167°N 88.418532°E
- Country: India
- State: West Bengal
- District: Darjeeling

Area
  - Total: 1.4812 km^{2} (0.5719 sq mi)

Population (2011)
  - Total: 9,184
  - Density: 6,200/km^{2} (16,060/sq mi)

Languages
  - Official: Bengali, English
- Time zone: UTC+5:30 (IST)
- PIN: 734003
- Telephone/STD code: 0353
- Vehicle registration: WB
- Lok Sabha constituency: Darjeeling
- Vidhan Sabha constituency: Matigara-Naxalbari
- Website: darjeeling.gov.in

Kalkut is a census town in the Matigara CD block in the Siliguri subdivision of Darjeeling district in the state of West Bengal, India.

== Geography ==
Places in the North-eastern portion of Siliguri subdivision in Darjeeling district
CT: census town, R: rural/ urban centre, MC: municipal corporation, F: facilities
Abbreviations used in names – TG for Tea Garden, Jn RS for Junction Railway Station
New Jalpaiguri Junction railway station is in Jalpaiguri district
Owing to space constraints in the small map, the actual locations in a larger map may vary slightly

=== Location ===
Kalkut is located at 26.762167°N 88.418532°E.

=== Area overview ===
The map alongside shows the Siliguri subdivision of Darjeeling district. This area is spread across the foothills of the Himalayas and is a plain land gently sloping from north to south. While the northern part is mentioned as the Terai region, the larger southern portion forms the western part of the Dooars region. While 55.11% per cent of the population resides in the rural areas, 44.89% resides in the urban areas. On the western side the Mechi River forms a long border with Nepal. On the eastern side the Mahananda River forms a short border with Bangladesh.

Note: The map alongside presents some of the notable locations in the subdivision. All places marked in the map are linked in the larger full screen map.

== Demographics ==
According to the 2011 Census of India, Kalkut had a total population of 9,184 of which 4,765 (52%) were males and 4,419 (48%) were females. There were 1,102 persons in the age range of 0 to 6 years. The total number of literate people in Kalkut was 6,329 (68.91% of the population over 6 years).

== Infrastructure ==
According to the District Census Handbook 2011, Darjiling, Kalkut covered an area of 1.4812 km^{2}. Among the civic amenities, it had 12 km roads with open drains, the protected water supply involved overhead tank, tap water from treated sources and spring, it had 797 domestic electric connections and 30 road lighting points. Among the medical facilities, it had 1 dispensary/ health centre, 1 maternity home, 8 medicine shops. Among the educational facilities it had were 5 primary schools, 1 secondary school, 1 senior secondary school, 1 non-formal education centre (Sarva Siksha Abiyan). It had the branches of 1 cooperative bank and 1 non-agricultural credit society.

== Education ==
Amiyo Palchoudhury Smriti Vidyalaya is a Bengali-medium coeducational institution established in 2001. It has facilities for teaching from class V to class XII.
