= Uttorayon Township =

- Township
- Location in West Bengal, India
- Coordinates: 26.71°N 88.43°E
- Country: India
- State: West Bengal
- District: Darjeeling

Languages
  - Official: Bengali, English
- Time zone: UTC+5:30 (IST)
- PIN: 734010
- Telephone code: 0353
- Lok Sabha constituency: Darjeeling
- Vidhan Sabha constituency: Siliguri
- Website: uttorayon.ambujaneotia.com

Uttorayon Township is a satellite town of Siliguri. It is in the foothills of the Himalayas on the outskirts of Siliguri. It consists of neat clusters of houses and apartments. It is the first satellite township project of Siliguri.

== Location ==
Uttorayon is located on the outskirts of Siliguri along National Highway 31 near Matigara. It is 9 km from the Bagdogra International Airport and is 3 km from Siliguri City proper.

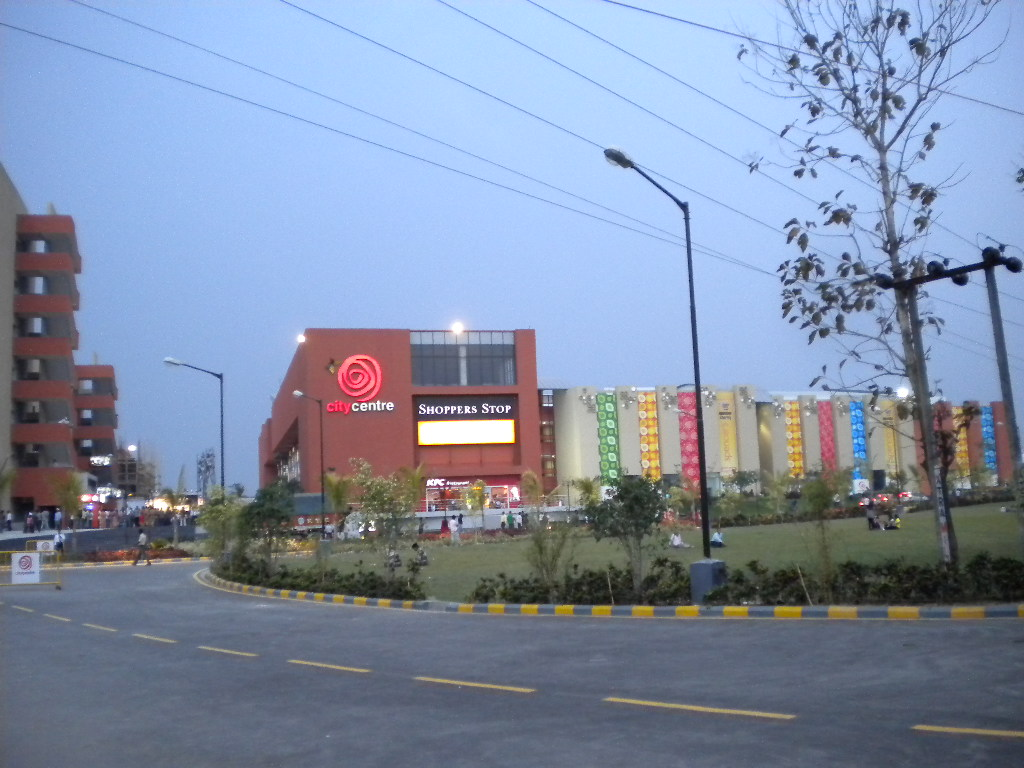
City Centre, Siliguri - is located at Uttorayon Township and also the largest mall of Siliguri

== Township building plan ==
Various bungalows are constructed across 1922 plots ranging from 2.5 to 20 kottahs. It also has a complex comprising five nine-story towers with a total of 220 HIG apartments. All apartments are provided with modern and well-equipped community centres, party lawns, swimming pools, gymnasiums, amphitheatres and more. It also has a Group Housing Complex comprising 400 flats in 25 buildings consisting of 112 LIG flats and 288 MIG flats. The total development area is 400 acres.

The township started off in an orderly arrangement, but over the last few years newly constructed houses have flouted building rules, made changes to plot entry points, indiscriminate razed trees, so the quality of the township is rapidly deteriorating.
