= Jorebunglow Sukhiapokhri (community development block) =

- Community development block
- Location in Darjeeling district
- Coordinates: 27.00°N 88.16°E
- Country: India
- State: West Bengal
- District: Darjeeling

Government
  - Type: Community development block

Area
  - Total: 222.12 km^{2} (85.76 sq mi)

Population (2011)
  - Total: 113,516
  - Density: 511.06/km^{2} (1,323.6/sq mi)
- Time zone: UTC+5:30 (IST)
- Lok Sabha constituency: Darjeeling
- Vidhan Sabha constituency: Darjeeling, Kurseong
- Website: darjeeling.gov.in

Jorebunglow Sukhiapokhri is a community development block (CD block) that forms an administrative division in the Darjeeling Sadar subdivision of the Darjeeling district in the Indian state of West Bengal.

== Geography ==
Sukhiapokhri is located at 27°00′N 88°10′E.

The snow-clad mountain ranges, a little to the north of the old Darjeeling district, form the main Himalayan range. Ranges/ ridges branching out from the main Himalayas pass through Darjeeling district. To the north-west towers the giant Kangchenjunga 28,146 ft (8,579 m) and to the north-east is Dongkya 23,184 ft (7,066 m). From Kangchenjunga the Singalila Ridge slopes down southward forming the border between India and Nepal. Manebhanjyang, Sandakphu and Phalut are popular trekking destinations on this ridge. It continues south and south-east through Tunglu and Senchal and other spurs that form the Darjeeling Hills west of the Teesta. To the east of the Teesta, a lofty ridge runs south of Dongkya, bifurcating at Gipmochi 11,518 ft (3,511 m), forming two spurs that contain the valley of the Jaldhaka. The lower portion of this hilly region forms the Kalimpong Hills. Four great hill ranges radiate from a single point at Ghum, a saddle 7,372 ft (2,247 m) high – the first, the Ghum range running due west to Simanabasti; the second, the Senchal-Mahaldiram range sloping south towards Kurseong, the highest points being East Senchel 8,600 ft (2,600 m), Tiger Hill 8,515 ft (2,595 m) and West Senchel 8,163 ft (2,488 m); the third, the Takdah or Takbu range, sloping north-east to a point above the junction of the Great Rangit and Teesta; the fourth, the Darjeeling Jalapahar Range, extending northwards towards Darjeeling.

Jorebunglow Sukhiapokhri CD block is part of the Darjeeling Himalayas physiographic region. This region is highest in elevation and covers the northernmost part of the district. The Singalila Ridge, the highest mountain range in the district and the state, is part of this region. Sandakphu 11,929 ft (3,636 m) and Phalut 11,800 ft (3,600 m) are the highest points in West Bengal.

Jorebunglow Sukhiapokhri CD block is bounded by the Darjeeling Pulbazar CD block on the north, Rangli Rangliot and Kurseong CD block on the east, Mirik CD block on the south and Panchthar and Ilam districts in Province No. 1 of Nepal on the west.

The Jorebunglow Sukhiapokhri CD block has an area of 222.12 km^{2}. It has 1 panchayat samity, 16 gram panchayats, 198 gram sansads (village councils), 47 mouzas, 42 inhabited villages and 4 census towns. Jorebunglow and Sukhiapokhri police station serve this block. Headquarters of this CD block is at Sukhiapokhri.

Gram panchayats in Jorebunglow Sukhiapokhri CD block are: Dhootria Kalej Valley, Ghoom Khasmahal, Gorabari Margarets Hope, Lingiamaraybong, Lower Sonada II, Munda Kothi, Permaguritamsang, Plungdung, Pokhriabong I, Pokhriabong II, Pokhriabong III, Rangbhang Gopaldhara, Rangbul, Sukhia Simana and Upper Sonada.

== Demographics ==
=== Population ===
According to the 2011 Census of India, the Jorebunglow Sukhiapokhri CD block had a total population of 113,516, of which 86,637 were rural and 26,879 were urban. There were 56,232 (50%) males and 57,284 (50%) females. There were 9,313 persons in the age range of 0 to 6 years. The Scheduled Castes numbered 6,415 (5.65%) and the Scheduled Tribes numbered 34,088 (30.03%).

Census towns in the Jorebunglow Sukhiapokhri CD block are (2011 census figures in brackets): Sukhiapokhri (4,450), Sonada Khasmahal (11,635), Rongmook Ceder Tea Garden (5,150) and Mangarjung Tea Garden (Nagri) (5,644).

Large villages (with 4,000+ population) in the Jorebunglow Sukhiapokhri CD block are (2011 census figures in brackets): Dooteria Tea Garden (5,113) and Ringtong Tea Garden (Margaret's Hope) (6,025).

Other villages in the Jorebunglow Sukhiapokhri CD block include (2011 census figures in brackets): Kalej Valley Tea Garden (2,640), Moonda Kotee Tea Garden (3,972), Pokhribong Khasmahal (3,051), Gopal Dhara Tea Garden (2,084), Rangbul (3,916), Jorebunglow (2,854), Mariabong Tea Garden (2,404), Pushinbong Tea Garden (2,879), Poobong Tea Garden (2,170), Nahori Tea Garden (Balason) (2,402), Sagmaru Tea Garden (Sungma) (2,229), Tarzun Tea Garden (2,232), Molatey Tea Garden (Aveneroge) (2,285), Nagri Farm Tea Garden (3,655), Dhajea Tea Garden (1,394)and Tumsong Tea Garden (1,700).

=== Literacy ===
According to the 2011 census the total number of literate persons in the Jorebunglow Sukhiapokhri CD block was 86,004 (82.54% of the population over 6 years) out of which males numbered 46, 323 (89.98% of the male population over 6 years) and females numbered 39,681 (75.26% of the female population over 6 years). The gender disparity (the difference between female and male literacy rates) was 14.72%.

See also – List of West Bengal districts ranked by literacy rate

Literacy in CD blocks of
Darjeeling district (2011)
Darjeeling Sadar subdivision
Darjeeling Pulbazar – 80.78%
Rangli Rangliot – 80.50%
Jorebunglow Sukhiapokhri – 82.54%
Kalimpong subdivision
Kalimpong I – 81.43%
Kalimpong II – 79.68%
Gorubathan – 76.88%
Kurseong subdivision
Kurseong – 81.15%
Mirik subdivision
Mirik – 80.84%
Siliguri subdivision
Matigara – 74.78%
Naxalbari – 75.47%
Phansidewa – 64.46%
Kharibari – 67.37%
2011 Census: CD Block Wise

Primary Census Abstract Data

=== Language and religion ===
Religion in Jorebunglow Sukhiapokhri CD block
Hinduism	67.84%
Buddhism	26.15%
Christian	4.48%
Kirat Mundhum	0.74%
Islam	0.62%
Others	0.17%

In the 2011 census, Hindus numbered 77,014 and formed 67.84% of the population in the Jorebunglow Sukhiapokhri CD block. Buddhists numbered 29,680 and formed 26.15% of the population. Christians numbered 5,084 and formed 4.48% of the population. Muslims numbered 699 and formed 0.62% of the population. Others numbered 1,039 and formed 0.92% of the population.

The West Bengal Official Language Act 1961 declared that Bengali and Nepali were to be used for official purposes in the three hill subdivisions of Darjeeling, Kalimpong and Kurseong in Darjeeling district.

Languages of Jorebunglow Sukhiapokhri CD block (2011)
1. Nepali (95.5%)
2. Hindi (1.16%)
3. Bhojpuri (1.01%)
4. Others (2.30%)

At the time of the 2011 census, 95.53% of the population spoke Nepali, 1.12% Hindi and 1.01% Bhojpuri as their first language.

== Rural Poverty ==
According to the Rural Household Survey in 2005, 24.40% of the total number of families were BPL families in the Darjeeling district. According to a World Bank report, as of 2012, 4-9% of the population in Darjeeling, North 24 Parganas and South 24 Parganas districts were below poverty level, the lowest among the districts of West Bengal, which had an average 20% of the population below poverty line.

== Economy ==
=== Livelihood ===
Livelihood
in Jorebunglow Sukhiapokhri CD block
1. Cultivators (7.47%)
2. Agricultural labourers (5.50%)
3. Household industries (2.28%)
4. Other Workers (84.8%)

In the Jorebunglow Sukhiapokhri CD block in 2011, among the class of total workers, cultivators numbered 2,947 and formed 7.47%, agricultural labourers numbered 2,170 and formed 5.50%, household industry workers numbered 898 and formed 2.28% and other workers numbered 33,419 and formed 84.75%. Total workers numbered 39,434 and formed 34.74% of the total population, and non-workers numbered 74,082 and formed 65.26% of the population.

Note: In the census records a person is considered a cultivator, if the person is engaged in cultivation/ supervision of land owned by self/government/institution. When a person who works on another person's land for wages in cash or kind or share, is regarded as an agricultural labourer. Household industry is defined as an industry conducted by one or more members of the family within the household or village, and one that does not qualify for registration as a factory under the Factories Act. Other workers are persons engaged in some economic activity other than cultivators, agricultural labourers and household workers. It includes factory, mining, plantation, transport and office workers, those engaged in business and commerce, teachers, entertainment artistes and so on.

=== Infrastructure ===
There are 42 inhabited villages in the Jorebunglow Sukhiapokhri CD block, as per the District Census Handbook, Darjiling, 2011. 100% villages have power supply. 100% villages have drinking water supply. 21 villages (50.00%) have post offices. 100% villages have telephones (including landlines, public call offices and mobile phones). 25 villages (59.52%) have pucca (paved) approach roads and 11 villages (26.19%) have transport communication (includes bus service, rail facility and navigable waterways). 1 village (2.38%) has an agricultural credit society and 2 villages (4.76%) have banks.

=== Agriculture ===
In 2012–13, there were 1 fertiliser depot, 1 seed store and 35 fair price shops in Jorebunglow Sukhiapokhri CD block.

In 2013–14, Jorebunglow Sukhiapokhri CD block produced 1,568 tonnes of maize from 711 hectares and 3,258 tonnes of potatoes from 239 hectares.

=== Tea gardens ===
Darjeeling tea "received the iconic status due to its significant aroma, taste and colour... the first Indian product to be marked with the Geographical Indication (GI) tag in 2003... As per the definition, "Darjeeling Tea" can only refer to tea that has been cultivated, grown, produced, manufactured and processed in tea gardens in few specific hilly areas of the district." Apart from the hill areas, tea is also grown in the plain areas of the terai and dooars, but such gardens are not covered under the GI tag.

As of 2009–10, there were 87 tea gardens covered under the GI tag, employing 51,091 persons. Total land under cultivation was 17,828.38 hectares and total production was 7.36 million kg. A much larger population is indirectly dependent on the tea industry in the district. The average annual production including those from the plain areas, exceeds 10 million kg.

As of 2013, Darjeeling subdivision had 46 tea estates, Kalimpong subdivision had 29 tea estates and Kurseong subdivision had 6 tea gardens. This added up to 81 tea estates in the hill areas. Bannackburn Tea Estate and Lingia Tea Estate in Darjeeling were the first to come up in 1835. Siliguri subdivision in the terai region had 45 tea estates.

=== Banking ===
In 2012–13, Jorebunglow Sukhiapokhri CD block had offices of 4 commercial banks and 2 gramin banks.

== Transport ==
Jorebunglow Sukhiapokhri CD block has 4 originating/ terminating bus routes. The nearest railway station is 12 km from the block headquarters.

National Highway 110 /Hill Cart Road passes through Jorebunglow Sukhiapokhri CD block.

State Highway 12 passes through Jorebunglow Sukhiapokhri CD block.

== Education ==
In 2012–13, Jorebunglow Sukhiapokhri CD block had 161 primary schools with 9,316 students, 8 middle schools with 2,288 students, 7 high schools with 2,120 students and 5 higher secondary schools with 4,131 students. Jorebunglow Sukhiapokhri CD block had 3 general degree colleges with 3,379 students and 392 institutions for special and non-formal education with 6,293 students.

See also – Education in India

According to the 2011 census, in Jorebunglow Sukhiapokhri CD block, among the 42 inhabited villages, 1 village did not have a school, 37 villages had two or more primary schools, 23 villages had at least 1 primary and 1 middle school and 15 villages had at least 1 middle and 1 secondary school.

Salesian College was established at Sonada in 1933.

Sonada Degree College was established at Sonada in 1985.

Ghoom Jorebunglow College was established in 2004 at Ghum.

== Healthcare ==
In 2013, Jorebunglow Sukhiapokhri CD block had 1 block primary health centre and 3 primary health centres with total 43 beds and 4 doctors (excluding private bodies). It had 36 family welfare subcentres. 559 patients were treated indoor and 18,769 patients were treated outdoor in the hospitals, health centres and subcentres of the CD block.

Sukhiapokhri Block Primary Health Centre, with 25 beds at Sukhiapokhri, is the major government medical facility in the Jorebunglow Sukhiapokhri CD block. There are primary health centres at Ghum (with 6 beds) and Pokhriabong (with 2 beds).
