= Mathapari =

- Census Town
- Location in West Bengal, India Mathapari (India)
- Coordinates: 26.70741°N 88.38407°E
- Country: India
- State: West Bengal
- District: Darjeeling

Area
  - Total: 2.0963 km^{2} (0.8094 sq mi)

Population (2011)
  - Total: 11,529
  - Density: 5,499.7/km^{2} (14,244/sq mi)

Languages
  - Official: Bengali, English
- Time zone: UTC+5:30 (IST)
- PIN: 734010
- Telephone/STD code: 0353
- Vehicle registration: WB
- Lok Sabha constituency: Darjeeling
- Vidhan Sabha constituency: Matigara-Naxalbari
- Website: darjeeling.gov.in

Mathapari is a census town in the Matigara CD block in the Siliguri subdivision of Darjeeling district in the state of West Bengal, India.

== Geography ==
Places in the North-eastern portion of Siliguri subdivision in Darjeeling district
CT: census town, R: rural/ urban centre, MC: municipal corporation, F: facilities
Abbreviations used in names – TG for Tea Garden, Jn RS for Junction Railway Station
New Jalpaiguri Junction railway station is in Jalpaiguri district
Owing to space constraints in the small map, the actual locations in a larger map may vary slightly

=== Location ===
Mathapari is located at 26.70741°N 88.38407°E.

Bairatisal, Tari, Jitu, Bara Mohansingh and Mathapari form a cluster of census towns as per map of Matigara CD block on page 265 of District Census Handbook, Darjeeling.

=== Area overview ===
The map alongside shows the Siliguri subdivision of Darjeeling district. This area is spread across the foothills of the Himalayas and is a plain land gently sloping from north to south. While the northern part is mentioned as the Terai region, the larger southern portion forms the western part of the Dooars region. While 55.11% per cent of the population resides in the rural areas, 44.89% resides in the urban areas. On the western side the Mechi River forms a long border with Nepal. On the eastern side the Mahananda River forms a short border with Bangladesh.

Note: The map alongside presents some of the notable locations in the subdivision. All places marked in the map are linked in the larger full screen map.

== Demographics ==
According to the 2011 Census of India, Mathapari had a total population of 11,529 of which 5,903 (51%) were males and 5,626 (49%) were females. There were 1,367 persons in the age range of 0 to 6 years. The total number of literate people in Mathapari was 7,857 (68.15% of the population over 6 years).

== Infrastructure ==
According to the District Census Handbook 2011, Darjiling, Mathapari covered an area of 2.0963 km^{2}. Among the civic amenities, the protected water supply involved tap water from treated sources, it had 1,600 domestic electric connections and 70 road lighting points. Among the medical facilities, it had 2 dispensaries/ health centres, 4 maternity and child welfare centres, 2 veterinary hospitals, 10 medicine shops. Among the educational facilities it had were 3 primary schools, 1 middle school, 1 secondary school, the nearest senior secondary school at Pathar Ghata, 1 km away. Among the social cultural and recreational facilities it had were 1 public library, 1reading room. It had the branch of 1 nationalised bank.
