= Mohorgon Tea Garden =

Mohurgong & Gulma Tea Estates
- Village
- Location in West Bengal, India Mohurgong & Gulma Tea Estates (India)
- Coordinates: 26.794567°N 88.38553°E
- Country: India
- State: West Bengal
- District: Darjeeling

Population (2023)
  - Total: 10,000

Languages
  - Official: Nepali, Adivasi, English, Bengali
- Time zone: UTC+5:30 (IST)
- PIN: 734009
- Telephone/STD code: 0353
- Vehicle registration: WB
- Lok Sabha constituency: Darjeeling
- Vidhan Sabha constituency: Matigara-Naxalbari
- Website: darjeeling.gov.in

Mohurgong & Gulma Tea Estates is a tea garden in the Matigara CD block in the Siliguri subdivision of Darjeeling district in the state of West Bengal, India.

== Geography ==
Places in the North-eastern portion of Siliguri subdivision in Darjeeling district
CT: census town, R: rural/ urban centre, MC: municipal corporation, F: facilities
Abbreviations used in names – TG for Tea Garden, Jn RS for Junction Railway Station
New Jalpaiguri Junction railway station is in Jalpaiguri district
Owing to space constraints in the small map, the actual locations in a larger map may vary slightly

=== Location ===
Mohorgon Tea Garden is located at 26.794567°N 88.385543°E.

=== Area overview ===
The map alongside shows the Siliguri subdivision of Darjeeling district. This area is spread across the foothills of the Himalayas and is a plain land gently sloping from north to south. While the northern part is mentioned as the Terai region, the larger southern portion forms the western part of the Dooars region. While 55.11% per cent of the population resides in the rural areas, 44.89% resides in the urban areas. On the western side the Mechi River forms a long border with Nepal. On the eastern side the Mahananda River forms a short border with Bangladesh.

Note: The map alongside presents some of the notable locations in the subdivision. All places marked in the map are linked in the larger full screen map.

== Demographics ==
According to the 2011 Census of India, Mohorgon Tea Garden had a total population of 3,169 of which 1,503 (47%) were males and 1,666 (53%) were females. There were 422 persons in the age range of 0 to 6 years. The total number of literate people in Mohorgon Tea Garden was 1,704 (53.77% of the population over 6 years).

== Mohurgong and Gulma Tea Estates ==
Mohurgong Tea Estate was established by the pioneer Indian planter Bipradas Palchoudhry in 1886. The place is located between Mahananda Wildlife Sanctuary and Siliguri. In 1930 Bipradas's son, Amiya Palchoudhury, purchased the adjoining Gulma Tea Estate from a British company and the two together were developed as a leading tea garden in the terai region. Presently, the fourth generation of the Palchoudhury family operates the tea estate. Large groups of people from the Eastern Himalayan and Chotanagpur regions thronged to work in the tea estate. Their descendants continue to work in the tea garden.

== Education ==
Ila Palchoudhury Memorial High School is a Hndi-medium coeducational institution established in 1981. It has facilities for teaching from class V to class XII.

== Transport ==
There is a station at Gulma, 10 km from New Jalpaiguri Junction railway station, on the New Jalpaiguri-Alipurduar-Samuktala line.
