= Matigarahat =

- Village
- Location in West Bengal, India Matigarahat (India)
- Coordinates: 26.722067°N 88.388553°E
- Country: India
- State: West Bengal
- District: Drjeeling

Population (2011)
  - Total: 4,710
- Time zone: UTC+5:30 (IST)
- PIN: 734010
- Telephone/STD code: 0353
- Lok Sabha constituency: Darjeeling
- Vidhan Sabha constituency: Matigara-Naxalbari
- Website: darjeeling.gov.in

Matigarahat is a village in the Matigara CD block in the Siliguri subdivision of the Darjeeling district in the state of West Bengal, India.

== Geography ==
Places in the North-eastern portion of Siliguri subdivision in Darjeeling district
CT: census town, R: rural/ urban centre, MC: municipal corporation, F: facilities
Abbreviations used in names – TG for Tea Garden, Jn RS for Junction Railway Station
New Jalpaiguri Junction railway station is in Jalpaiguri district
Owing to space constraints in the small map, the actual locations in a larger map may vary slightly

=== Location ===
Matigarahat is located at 26.722067°N 88.388533°E.

=== Area overview ===
The map alongside shows the Siliguri subdivision of Darjeeling district. This area is spread across the foothills of the Himalayas and is a plain land gently sloping from north to south. While the northern part is mentioned as the Terai region, the larger southern portion forms the western part of the Dooars region. While 55.11% per cent of the population resides in the rural areas, 44.89% resides in the urban areas. On the western side the Mechi River forms a long border with Nepal. On the eastern side the Mahananda River forms a short border with Bangladesh.

Note: The map alongside presents some of the notable locations in the subdivision. All places marked in the map are linked in the larger full screen map.

== Demographics ==
According to the 2011 Census of India, Matigarahat had a total population of 4,710 of which 2,413 (51%) were males and 2,297 (49%) were females. There were 654 persons in the age range of 0 to 6 years. The total number of literate people in Matigarahat was 2,781 (59.04% of the population over 6 years).

== Civic administration ==
=== Police station ===
Matigara police station has jurisdiction over the Matigara CD block.

== Transport ==
There is station at Matigara on the Katihar-Siliguri line.

== Education ==
Matigara Harasundar High School is a Bengali-medium coeducational institution established in 1959. It has facilities for teaching from class V to class XII.
