= Sankar Malakar =

Indian politician

Member of the West Bengal Legislative Assembly
- In office 2011–2021
- Preceded by: Assembly was Created
- Succeeded by: Anandamoy Barman
- Constituency: Matigara-Naxalbari

Personal details
- Born: 1954 or 1955 Siliguri
- Party: All India Trinamool Congress
- Other political affiliations: Indian National Congress
- Education: University of North Bengal
- Profession: Politician

Sankar Malakar (born 1954 or 1955) is an Indian politician from West Bengal. He is a former member of the West Bengal Legislative Assembly from Matigara-Naxalbari Assembly constituency, which is reserved for Scheduled Caste community, in Darjeeling district.

== Early life and education ==
Malakar is from Siliguri, Darjeeling district, West Bengal. He is the son of late Rajendra Malakar. He studied BA under open schooling system at Indira Gandhi National Open University from 2017.

== Career ==
Malakar first became an MLA winning the 2011 West Bengal Legislative Assembly election from Matigara Naxalbari Assembly constituency representing the Indian National Congress. He polled 74,334 votes and defeated his nearest rival, Jharen Roy of the Communist Party of India (Marxist), by a margin of 6,833 votes. He retained the seat for the Congress winning the 2016 West Bengal Legislative Assembly election where he polled 86,441 votes and defeated his closest opponent, Amar Sinha of the Trinamool Congress, by a margin of 18,627 votes. He lost the 2021 West Bengal Legislative Assembly election finishing third behind winner, Anandamoy Barman of the Bharatiya Janata Party and Rajen Sundas of the TMC, who finished second. In 2019, he also contested and lost from the Darjeeling Lok Sabha constituency, which was won by Raju Bista of the BJP. He was elected as the President of Darjeeling District Congress Committee. He joined Trinamool Congress in 4 June 2025
