= Jorebungalow =

- Village
- Location in West Bengal, India Jorebungalow (India)
- Coordinates: 27.0122°N 88.2585°E
- Country: India
- State: West Bengal
- District: Drjeeling

Population (2011)
  - Total: 703
- Time zone: UTC+5:30 (IST)
- PIN: 734201
- Lok Sabha constituency: Darjeeling
- Vidhan Sabha constituency: Darjeeling
- Website: darjeeling.gov.in

Jorebungalow (also spelt Jorebunglow) is a village in the Jorebunglow Sukhiapokhri CD block in the Darjeeling Sadar subdivision of the Darjeeling district in the Indian state of West Bengal.

== Geography ==
Places and tea estates in the southern portion of Darjeeling Sadar subdivision (including Jorebunglow Sukhiapokhri CD block), and Mirik Subdivision in Darjeeling district
CT: census town, R: rural/ urban centre, NP: national park/ wildlife sanctuary, TE: tea estate
Abbreviations used in names – TG for Tea Garden (town/village), TE for Tea Estate
Owing to space constraints in the small map, the actual locations in a larger map may vary slightly

=== Location ===
Jorebungalow is located at 27.0122°N 88.2585°E.

=== Area overview ===
The map alongside shows a part of the southern portion of the Darjeeling Himalayan hill region in the Darjeeling district. In the Darjeeling Sadar subdivision 61.00% of the total population lives in the rural areas and 39.00% of the population lives in the urban areas. In the Mirik subdivision 80.11% of the total population lives in rural areas and 19.89% lives in urban areas. There are 78 tea gardens/ estates (the figure varies slightly according to different sources), in the district, producing and largely exporting Darjeeling tea. It engages a large proportion of the population directly/ indirectly. Some tea gardens were identified in the 2011 census as census towns or villages. Such places are marked in the map as CT (census town) or R (rural/ urban centre). Specific tea estate pages are marked TE.

Note: The map alongside presents some of the notable locations in the subdivision. All places marked in the map are linked in the larger full screen map.

== Civic Administration ==
=== Police station ===
Jorebungalow police station has jurisdiction over the Jorebunglow Sukhiapokhri CD block.

== Demographics ==
According to the 2011 Census of India, Jorebungalow had a total population of 2,854 of which 1,368 (48%) were males and 1,486 (52%) were females. There were 267 persons in the age range of 0 to 6 years. The total number of literate people in Jorebungalow was 2,332 (8171% of the population over 6 years).

== Economy ==
This tiny hamlet was one of the most important trading points during the British rule. For most of the tea gardens in the neighbouring areas like Glenbourne, Teesta Valley, etc., Jorebungalow was the storage point for tea leaves to be transported to Calcutta and beyond and to bring back rations and items of daily needs.
