= Ghum Monastery =

Popular name of Yiga Choeling

Ghoom Monasteries
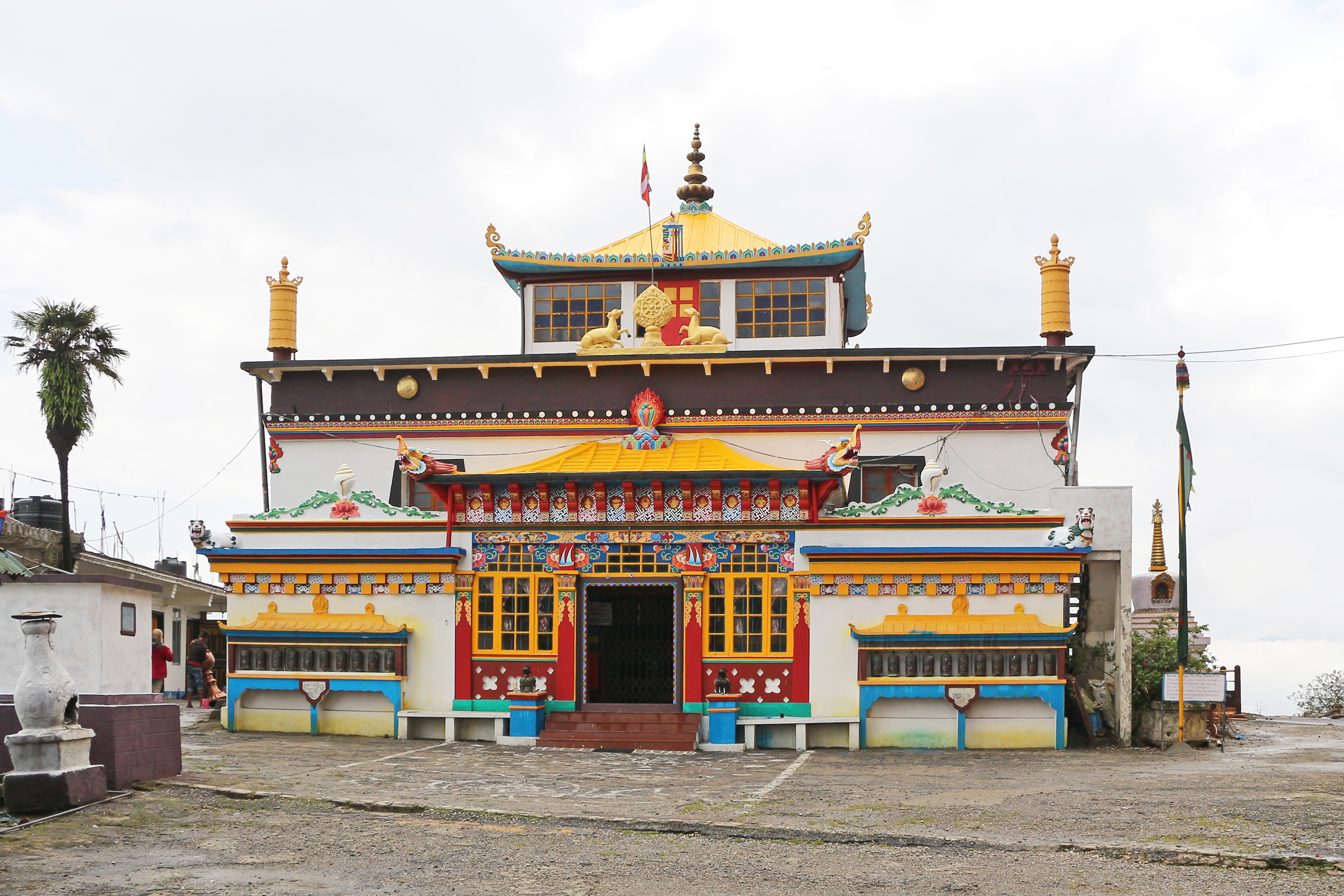
- Yiga Choeling Monastery

- Location within India

Religion
- Affiliation: Tibetan Buddhism
- Sect: Gelug

Location
- Location: Ghum, West Bengal, India
- Interactive map of Ghoom Monasteries
- Coordinates: 27°0′42″N 88°15′1″E

Architecture
- Founder: Lama Sherab Gyatso
- Established: 1875; 151 years ago

Old Ghoom Monastery is the popular name of Yiga Choeling. The monastery belongs to the Gelukpa or the Yellow Hat sect and is known for its 15 feet (4.6 m)-high statue of the Maitreya Buddha. The external structure of the building was established in 1850 by the Mongolian astrologer and monk Sokpo Sherab Gyatso, who was head of the monastery until 1905.

In 1909, Kyabje Domo Geshe Rinpoche Ngawang Kalsang, popularly called Lama Domo Geshe Rinpoche, succeeded Sherab Gyatso as the head. It was he who commissioned the statue of the Maitreya Buddha, and he remained head until 1952.

During the Chinese occupation of 1959 in Tibet many high ranking abbots fled to India and took refuge in the monastery. In 1961, Dhardo Rimpoche became head of the Yiga Choeling monastery Ghoom, Darjeeling. He died in 1990 and three years later, a boy named Tenzin Legshad Wangdi was recognised as his reincarnation.

On 25 April 1996, he was enthroned at Kalimpong Tibetan ITBCI school. The thirteenth in the line of Tulkus, Tenzin Legshad Wangdi, still goes by the name of Dhardo Tulku. He is studying Tibetan Philosophy at Drepung Loseling University in South India.

Under the supervision of Dhardo Rimpoche, the Managing Committee was set up in order to improve the monastery. Some of the initiatives have been successful, others not.

For the last two decades, the monastery has been going through severe crises in terms of both monks and finance. Till now, the grants-in-aid entitled to the monastery have not been received either from the government nor from any other source. Presently the monastery is meeting its needs through donations and contributions from local devotees.

== Samten Choeling ==
The Samten Choeling monastery lies below the road and is today less visited by local people due to various religious beliefs and confusion.

The monastery, which was built in 1875 by Lama Sherab Gyatso, follows the Gelug school of Tibetan Buddhism. Amongst the Buddhist texts available are the Kangyur, the Tibetan Buddhist canon, running into 108 volumes. The monks fly prayer flags in the Tibetan tradition.

== Gallery ==
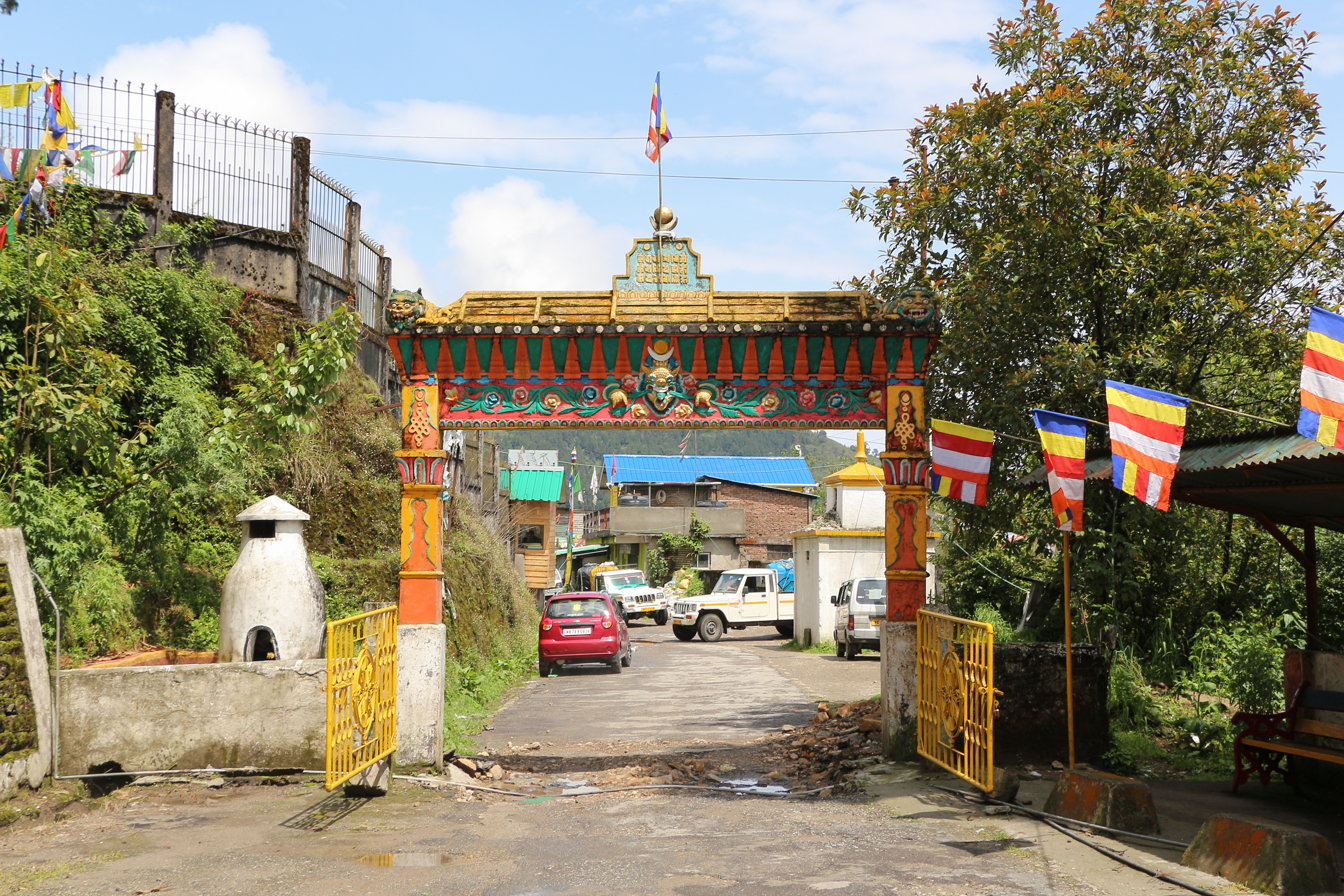
Gate of Yiga Choeling Monastery

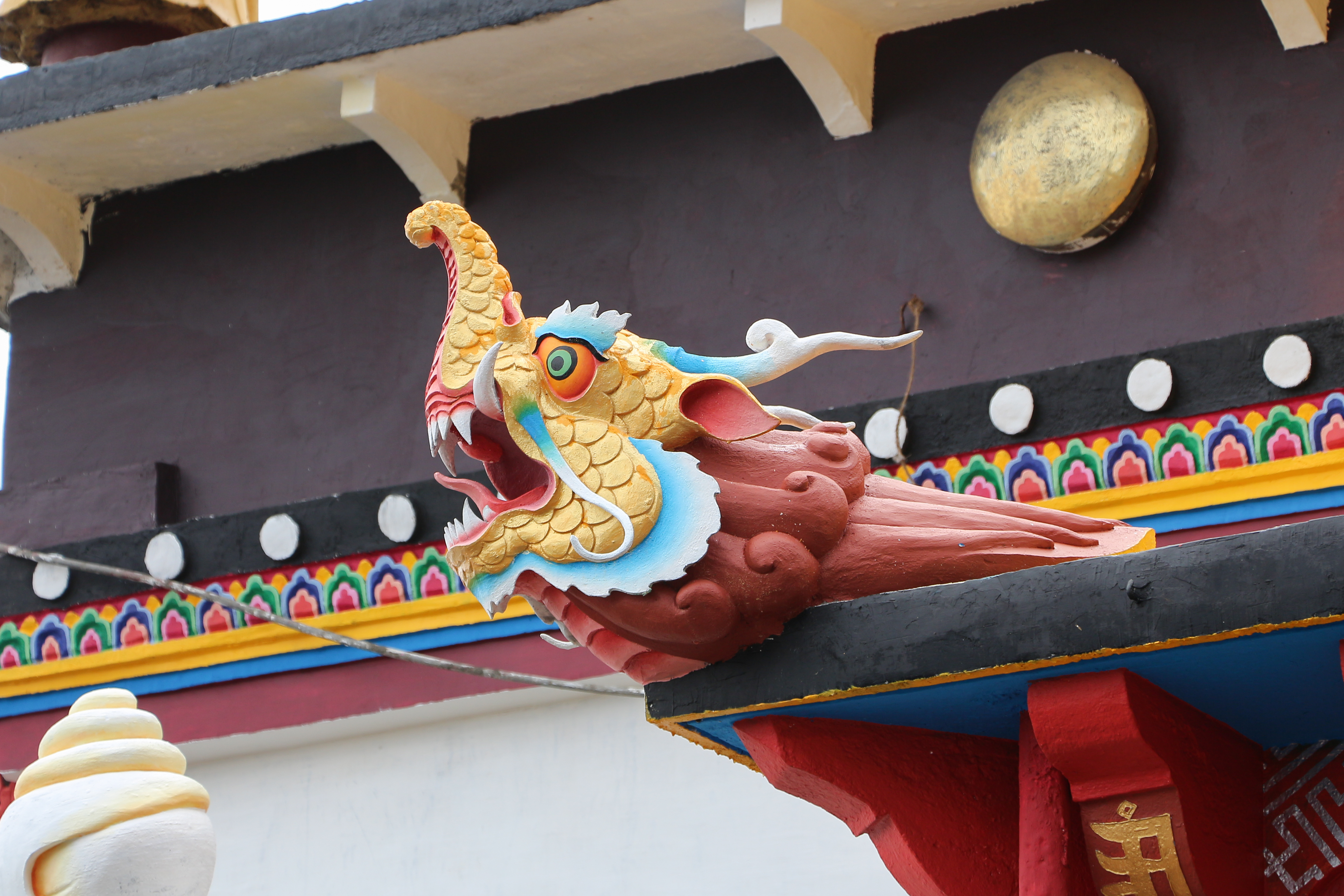
Garuda at Yiga Choeling Monastery

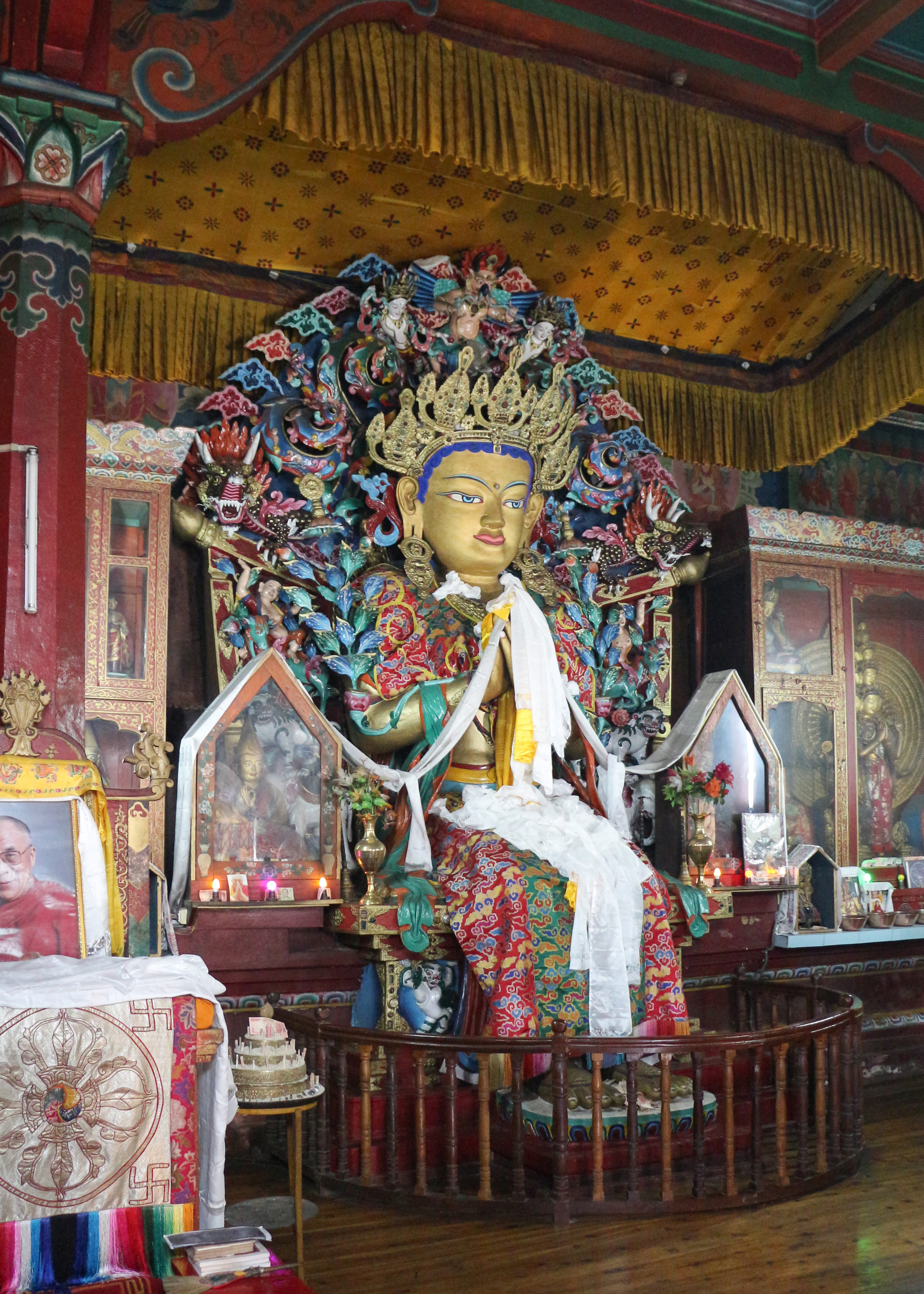
Maitreya Buddha in Yiga Choeling Monastery

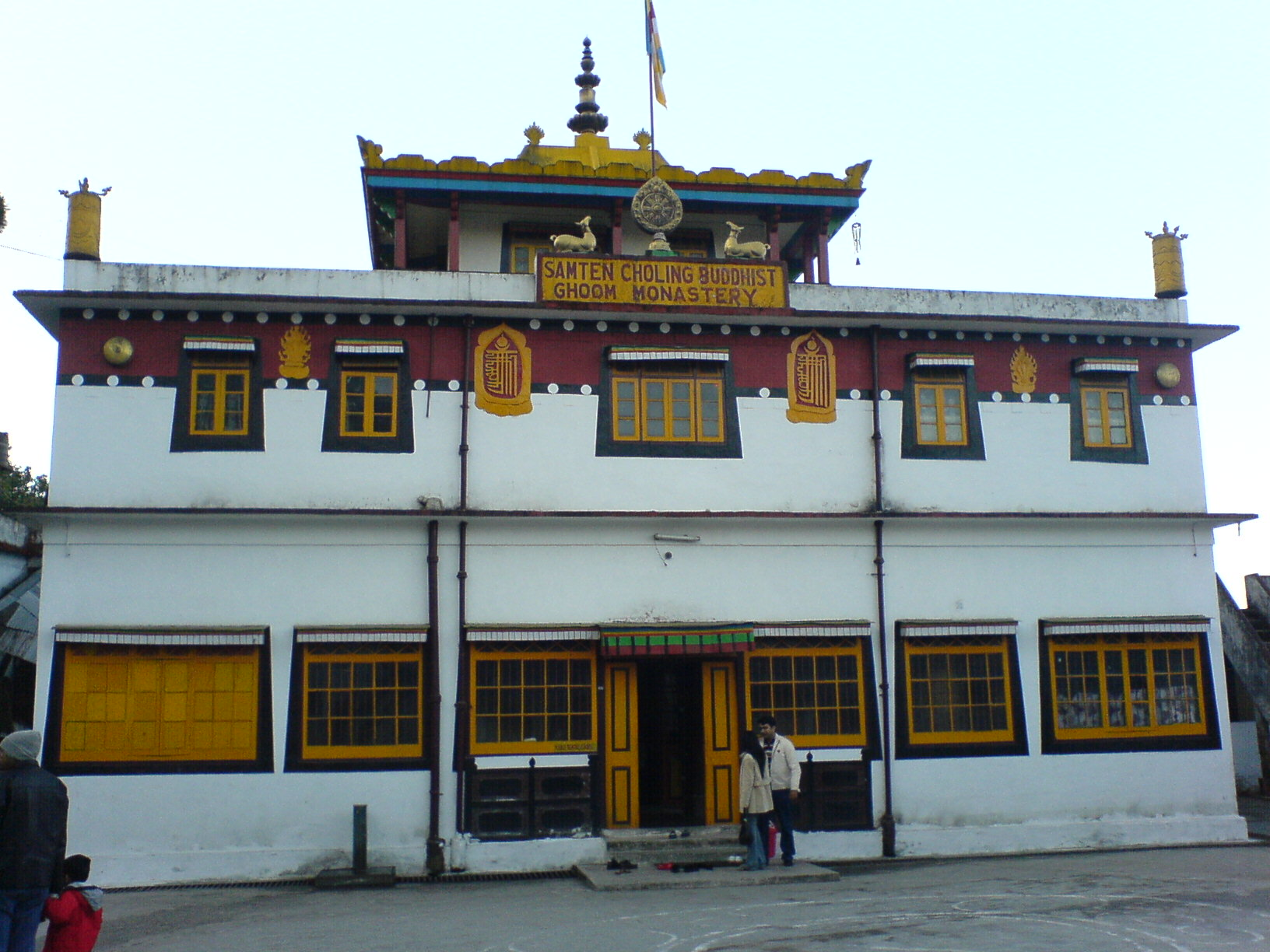
Samten Choeling monastery

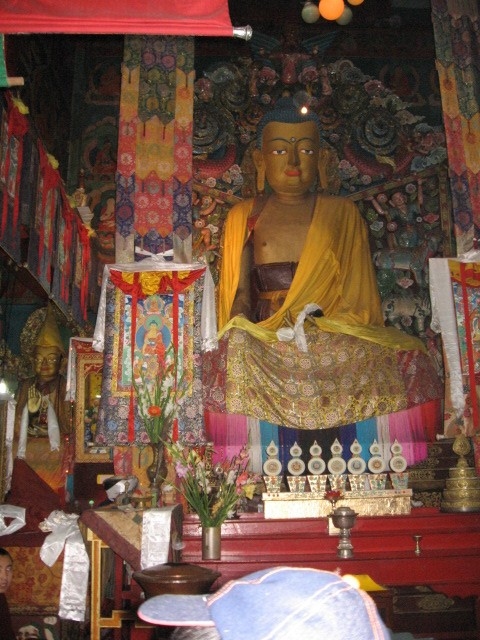
Maitreya Buddha in Samten Choeling monastery

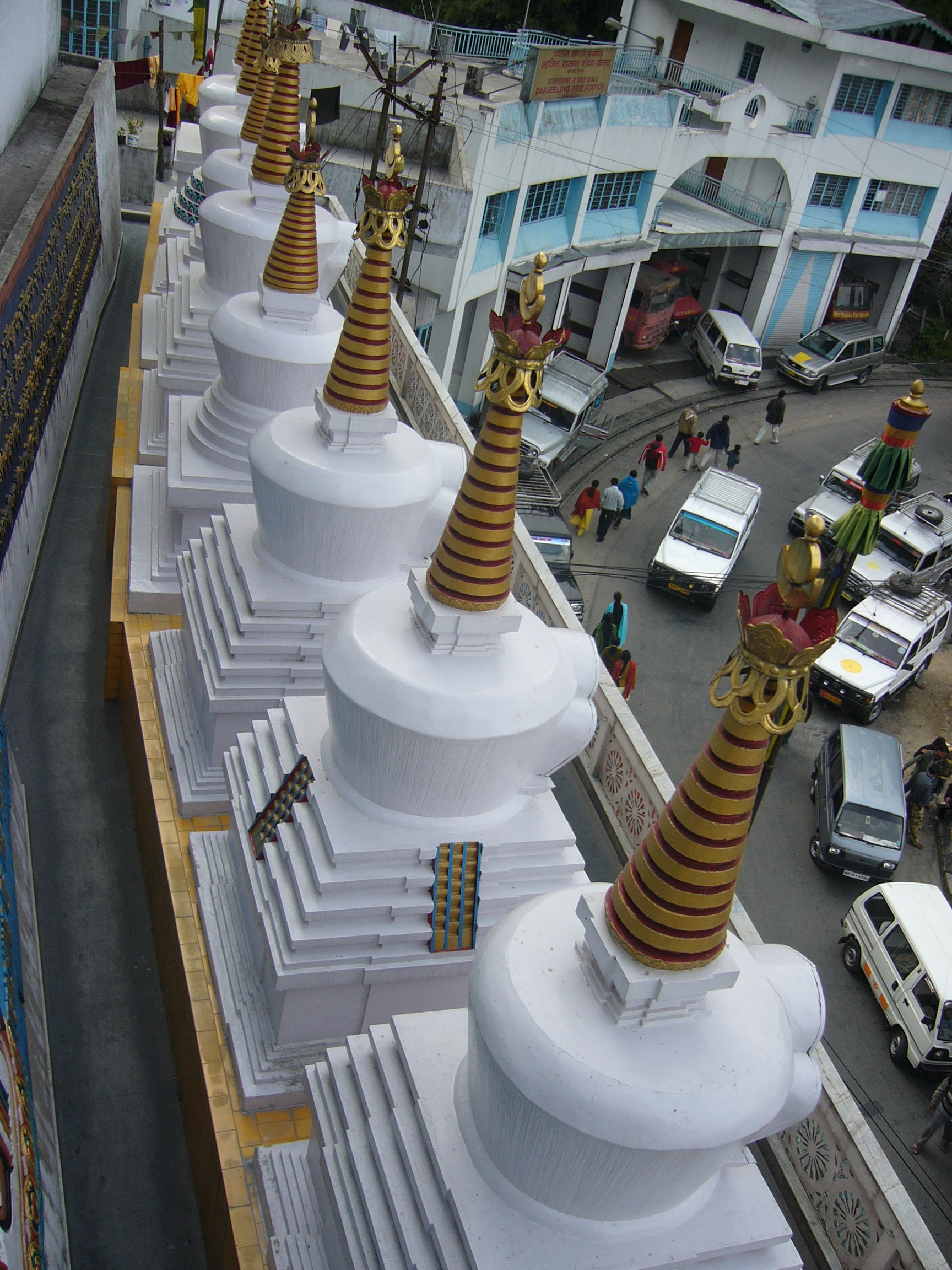
Chortens
