= Anandamay Barman =

Indian politician

Minister of State, Government of West Bengal
- Incumbent
- Assumed office 1 June 2026
- Governor: R. N. Ravi
- Chief Minister: Suvendu Adhikari
- Departments: Finance; Transport
- Cabinet Ministers: Swapan Dasgupta; Arjun Singh

Member of the West Bengal Legislative Assembly
- Incumbent
- Assumed office 2 May 2021
- Preceded by: Sankar Malakar
- Constituency: Matigara-Naxalbari

Personal details
- Born: 28 June 1982 (age 44) Siliguri
- Party: Bharatiya Janata Party
- Education: Master of Arts (Bengali), M.Ed.
- Alma mater: University of North Bengal
- Profession: Politician

Anandamay Barman is an Indian politician from Bharatiya Janata Party. In May 2021, he was elected as a member of the West Bengal Legislative Assembly from Matigara-Naxalbari (constituency). He defeated Sankar Malakar of All India Trinamool Congress by 104,265 votes in 2026 West Bengal Assembly election. He is now the President of Siliguri organization district BJP.

== Electoral performance ==
West Bengal Legislative Assembly
Year	Constituency	Party	Votes	%	Opponent	Party	Votes	%	Margin	Result
2021	Matigara-Naxalbari	BJP	1,39,785	58.1	Rajen Sundas	AITC	68,937	28.65	70,848	Won
2026	Matigara-Naxalbari	BJP	1,66,905	66.5	Shankar Malakar	AITC	62,640	24.96	1,04,265	Won

== See also ==
- 2026 West Bengal Legislative Assembly election
- List of chief ministers of West Bengal
- West Bengal Legislative Assembly
- 18th West Bengal Assembly
