= Sukhia Pokhri =

- Census Town
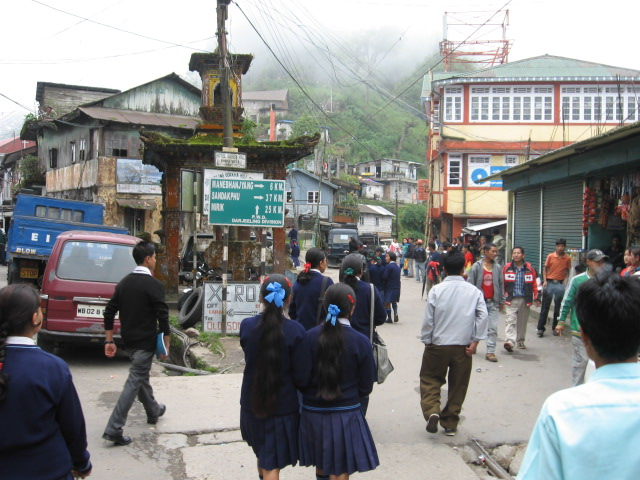

- Location in West Bengal, India
- Coordinates: 26.9986°N 88.1672°E
- Country: India
- State: West Bengal
- District: Darjeeling
- Elevation: 2,194 m (7,198 ft)

Population (2011)
  - Total: 4,450

Languages
  - Official: Nepali, English
- Time zone: UTC+5:30 (IST)
- PIN: 734221
- Telephone code: 91 354
- Vehicle registration: WB-73, WB-74
- Lok Sabha constituency: Darjeeling
- Vidhan Sabha constituency: Darjeeling

Sukhia Pokhri is a census town in the Jorebunglow Sukhiapokhri CD block in the Darjeeling Sadar subdivision of the Darjeeling district in the indian state of West Bengal. It is located 11 km from Ghum on the way to Mirik.

== Geography ==
Places and tea estates in the southern portion of Darjeeling Sadar subdivision (including Jorebunglow Sukhiapokhri CD block), and Mirik Subdivision in Darjeeling district
CT: census town, R: rural/ urban centre, NP: national park/ wildlife sanctuary, TE: tea estate
Abbreviations used in names – TG for Tea Garden (town/village), TE for Tea Estate
Owing to space constraints in the small map, the actual locations in a larger map may vary slightly

=== Location ===
Sukhia Pokhri is located at 26.9986°N 88.1672°E.

Sukhia Pokhri is near Nepal's eastern border with India at Ilam District, Province No. 1. There is a crossing to Pashupatinagar town with a Nepal customs checkpoint. Indian and Nepalese nationals cross without restriction.

=== Area overview ===
The map alongside shows a part of the southern portion of the Darjeeling Himalayan hill region in the Darjeeling district. In the Darjeeling Sadar subdivision 61.00% of the total population lives in the rural areas and 39.00% of the population lives in the urban areas. In the Mirik subdivision 80.11% of the total population lives in rural areas and 19.89% lives in urban areas. There are 78 tea gardens/ estates (the figure varies slightly according to different sources), in the district, producing and largely exporting Darjeeling tea. It engages a large proportion of the population directly/ indirectly. Some tea gardens were identified in the 2011 census as census towns or villages. Such places are marked in the map as CT (census town) or R (rural/ urban centre). Specific tea estate pages are marked TE.

Note: The map alongside presents some of the notable locations in the subdivision. All places marked in the map are linked in the larger full screen map.

== Demographics ==
According to the 2011 Census of India, Sukhia Pokhri had a total population of 4,450 of which 2,184 (49%) were males and 2266 (51%) were females. There were 363 persons in the age range of 0 to 6 years. The total number of literate people in Sukhia Pokhri was 3,650 (82.02% of the population over 6 years).

== Civic Administration ==
=== Police station ===
Sukhia Pokhri police station has jurisdiction over the Jorebunglow Sukhiapokhri CD block.

=== CD block HQ ===
Headquarters of Jorebunglow Sukhia Pokhri CD block is at Sukhia Pokhri.

== Infrastructure ==
According to the District Census Handbook 2011, Darjiling, Sukhiapokhri covered an area of 0.1214 km^{2}. Among the civic amenities, it had 4 km of roads with both open and closed drains, the protected water supply involved service reservoir and tap water from treated sources. It had 698 domestic electric connections. Among the medical facilities, it had 1 dispensary/ health centre, 1 family welfare centre, 1 veterinary hospital and 2 medicine shops. Among the educational facilities it had were 8 primary schools, 4 middle schools, 2 secondary schools, 1 senior secondary school, the nearest degree college at Ghum 12 km away. Among the social, cultural and recreational facilities, it had 1 auditorium/ community hall and 1 public library.

== Tourism ==
GHOOM ROCK is one of the eight famous Darjeeling sight seeing points. It is located between Ghoom and Sukhia Pokhri above Lepcha Jagat village .Apart from 360 degree view of the Mount Kanchenjunga it is a favourite place for bird watchers. JORE POKHRI – Jore pokhri literally means twin ponds in Nepali is another tourist destination famous for its scenic beauty and quiet ambience. There is a tourist lodge maintained by GTA. HIMALAYAN SALAMANDER Himalayan Salamander (Tylototriton verrucosus) an endangered species is found at Jore Pokhri. TEMPLE There is a Bhagwati Devi Temple (Durga temple) which is more than 500 years old highly revered by the local people.

HOME STAYS/LODGES There are many homestays and lodges in Sukhia Bazaar, Lepchajagat, Majidhura, Kaiyabhir, Gurasay, Mazuwa, Rangbhang, Pussimbing, Poobong, Pulungdung and Ramjee with access to motorable roads.

Gurashey Forest Resort, near Sukhia Pokhri, is one of the new attractions on the misty heights of the Eastern Himalayas. The entire Kanchenjunga range can be viewed from the resort. At dawn and dusk, the mountains bathed in gold present an unforgettable sight. Surrounded by slopes of silver fir, hemlock and magnolia, Gurashey stands brooding. A pall of gloom seems to hang over the township for most of the year, like the veil of clouds that obscures the Kanchenjunga and other snow-capped titans in the distance. In spring, though, the sparkle of rhododendrons lights up the region.

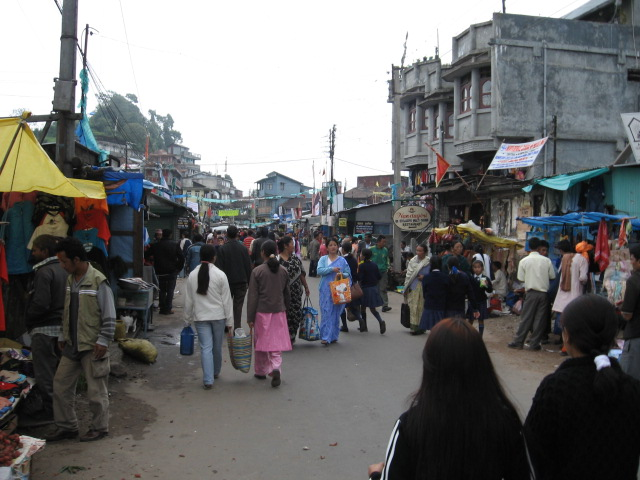
Sukhia Pokhri Friday market

From Sukhiapokhri one can go to different tea gardens and other small towns or villages in the area. Jorepokhri is the home of the Himalayan salamander (Tylototriton verrucosus), now extinct in most parts of the world. There are several towns/villages on the India-Nepal border – Manebhanjang, Simana, etc. Sukhia Pokhri has a police station.

== Education ==
Sukhiapokhri Higher Secondary School is an English-medium coeducational institution established in 1888. It has facilities for teaching from class V to class XII. It has 12 computers, a library with 500 books and a playground.

Nagri Farm Higher Secondary School is an English-medium coeducational institution established in 1961. It has facilities for teaching from class V to class XII.

MAGNO VALE ACADEMY, is a co-educational institution affiliated to CISCE, New Delhi. The school is fully equipped with Science laboratories auditorium, computer lab, playground and a library. St. Milarepa Academy, a coeducational institution, follows the ICSE syllabus. SUKHIA COLLEGE -SWATANTRATA SENANI GAGA TSHERING DUKPA COLLEGE is located at Majidhura, named after Gorkha freedom fighter Gaga Tshering Dukpa, who was born on 7 December 1909 and died on 11 December 1992 at Rana Dara Permaguri Busty, Sukhia Pokhri. St. Charles Public School follows the CBSE syllabus.
