= Matigara (community development block) =

- Community development block
- Coordinates: 26.716667°N 88.383333°E
- Country: India
- State: West Bengal
- District: Darjeeling

Area
  - Total: 143.00 km^{2} (55.21 sq mi)

Population (2011)
  - Total: 197,278
  - Density: 1,379.6/km^{2} (3,573.1/sq mi)
- Time zone: UTC+5:30 (IST)
- Lok Sabha constituency: Darjeeling
- Vidhan Sabha constituency: Matigara-Naxalbari, Kurseong
- Website: darjeeling.gov.in

Matigara is a community development block (CD block) that forms an administrative division in the Siliguri subdivision of the Darjeeling district in the Indian state of West Bengal.

== Geography ==
Matigara is located at 26°43′0″N 88°23′0″E at an elevation of 127 m above sea level.

Matigara CD block is bounded by the Kurseong CD block on the north, Rajganj CD block in Jalpaiguri district on the east, Phansidewa CD block on the south and Naxalbari CD block on the west.

The Matigara CD block has an area of 143.00 km^{2}. It has 1 panchayat samity, 5 gram panchayats, 123 gram sansads (village councils), 79 mouzas, 59 inhabited villages and 6 census towns. Matigara police station serves this block. Pradhan Nagar Police Station has jurisdiction over a part of the Siliguri Municipal Corporation. Headquarters of this CD block is at Bairatisal. As per map of Matigara CD block in the District Census Handbook, Matigara Police Station is shown in Matigarahat mouza and Pradhan Nagar Police Station is shown as being a part of the Siliguri Municipal Corporation area. In both the cases, the places are not named but indicated by symbols indicating PS.

Gram panchayats in Matigara CD block are: Atharakhai, Patharghata, Matigara I, Matigara II and Champasari.

== Demographics ==
=== Population ===
According to the 2011 Census of India, the Matigara CD block had a total population of 197,278, of which 135,583 were rural and 61,695 were urban. There were 101,023 (51%) males and 96,255 (49%) females. There were 24,760 persons in the age range of 0 to 6 years. The Scheduled Castes numbered 70,527 (35.75%) and the Scheduled Tribes numbered 26,484 (13.42%).

Census towns in the Matigara CD block are (2011 census figures in brackets): Kalkut (9,184), Tari (14,558), Bairatisal (4,916), Jitu (5,892), Mathapari (11,529) and Bara Mohansingh (15,616).

Large villages (with 4,000+ population) in the Matigara CD block are (2011 census figures in brackets): Khaprail (4,004), Khopalasi (5,284), Pachanai (5,105), Palash (4,204), Mahishmari (6,010), Baniakhari (5,088), Kaukhali (6,615), Kalam (5,664), Patiram (8,315), Tomba (9,632), Matigarahat (4,710), Gaurcharan (4,124) and Daknikata (4,497).

Other villages in the Matigara CD block include (2011 census figures in brackets): Mohorgon Tea Garden (3,169).

=== Literacy ===
According to the 2011 census the total number of literate persons in the Matigara CD block was 129,006 (74.78% of the population over 6 years) out of which males numbered 72,352 (81.75% of the male population over 6 years) and females numbered 56,654 (67.43% of the female population over 6 years). The gender disparity (the difference between female and male literacy rates) was 14.32%.

See also – List of West Bengal districts ranked by literacy rate

Literacy in CD blocks of
Darjeeling district (2011)
Darjeeling Sadar subdivision
Darjeeling Pulbazar – 80.78%
Rangli Rangliot – 80.50%
Jorebunglow Sukhiapokhri – 82.54%
Kalimpong subdivision
Kalimpong I – 81.43%
Kalimpong II – 79.68%
Gorubathan – 76.88%
Kurseong subdivision
Kurseong – 81.15%
Mirik subdivision
Mirik – 80.84%
Siliguri subdivision
Matigara – 74.78%
Naxalbari – 75.47%
Phansidewa – 64.46%
Kharibari – 67.37%
2011 Census: CD Block Wise

Primary Census Abstract Data

=== Language and religion ===
Religion in Matigara CD block (2011)
Hinduism	87.51%
Christian	5.37%
Islam	5.22%
Buddhism	1.45%
Others	0.45%

In the 2011 census, Hindus numbered 172,637 and formed 87.51% of the population in the Matigara CD block. Christians numbered 10,591 and formed 5.37% of the population. Muslims numbered 10,305 and formed 5.22% of the population. Buddhists numbered 2,855 and formed 1.45% of the population. Others numbered 890 and formed 0.45% of the population.

Languages of Matigara CD block (2011)
1. Bengali (44.3%)
2. Hindi (12.4%)
3. Rajbongshi (12.2%)
4. Nepali (12.1%)
5. Sadri (10.1%)
6. Bhojpuri (1.42%)
7. 'Other' Bengali (1.32%)
8. Others (6.12%)

At the time of the 2011 census, 44.26% of the population spoke Bengali, 12.41% Hindi, 12.22% Rajbongshi, 12.14% Nepali, 10.11% Sadri and 1.42% Bhojpuri as their first language. 1.32% were recorded as speaking 'Others' under Bengali. Other languages spoken in the district include Kurukh, Boro, Munda and Santali.

== Rural Poverty ==
According to the Rural Household Survey in 2005, 24.40% of the total number of families were BPL families in the Darjeeling district. According to a World Bank report, as of 2012, 4-9% of the population in Darjeeling, North 24 Parganas and South 24 Parganas districts were below poverty level, the lowest among the districts of West Bengal, which had an average 20% of the population below poverty line.

== Economy ==
=== Livelihood ===
Livelihood
in Matigara CD block
1. Cultivators (2.46%)
2. Agricultural labourers (1.28%)
3. Household industries (2.34%)
4. Other Workers (93.9%)

In the Matigara CD block in 2011, among the class of total workers, cultivators numbered 1,852 and formed 2.46%, agricultural labourers numbered 964 and formed 1.28%, household industry workers numbered 1,765 and formed 2.34% and other workers numbered 70,786 and formed 93.92%. Total workers numbered 76,367 and formed 38.20% of the total population, and non-workers numbered 121,911 and formed 61.80% of the population.

Note: In the census records a person is considered a cultivator, if the person is engaged in cultivation/ supervision of land owned by self/government/institution. When a person who works on another person's land for wages in cash or kind or share, is regarded as an agricultural labourer. Household industry is defined as an industry conducted by one or more members of the family within the household or village, and one that does not qualify for registration as a factory under the Factories Act. Other workers are persons engaged in some economic activity other than cultivators, agricultural labourers and household workers. It includes factory, mining, plantation, transport and office workers, those engaged in business and commerce, teachers, entertainment artistes and so on.

=== Infrastructure ===
There are 59 inhabited villages in the Matigara CD block, as per the District Census Handbook, Darjiling, 2011. 100% villages have power supply. 100% villages have drinking water supply. 6 villages (10.17%) have post offices. 57 villages (96.61%) have telephones (including landlines, public call offices and mobile phones). 52 villages (88.14%) have pucca (paved) approach roads and 18 villages (30.51%) have transport communication (includes bus service, rail facility and navigable waterways). 3 villages (5.08%) have banks.

=== Agriculture ===
In 2012-13, there were 2 fertiliser depots, 2 seed stores, 18 fair price shops in Matigara CD block.

In 2013–14, Matigara CD block produced 1,242 tonnes of Aman paddy, the main winter crop, from 784 hectares, 24 tonnes of Aus paddy (summer crop) from 18 hectares, 12 tonnes of wheat from 17 hectares, 23 tonnes of maize from 10 hectares, 409 tonnes of jute from 29 hectares and 425 tonnes of potatoes from 23 hectares. It also produced pulses and oilseeds.

=== Tea gardens ===
Darjeeling tea “received the iconic status due to its significant aroma, taste and colour… the first Indian product to be marked with the Geographical Indication (GI) tag in 2003… As per the definition, “Darjeeling Tea” can only refer to tea that has been cultivated, grown, produced, manufactured and processed in tea gardens in few specific hilly areas of the district.” Apart from the hill areas, tea is also grown in the plain areas of the terai and dooars, but such gardens are not covered under the GI tag.

As of 2009-10, there were 87 tea gardens covered under the GI tag, employing 51,091 persons. Total land under cultivation was 17,828.38 hectares and total production was 7.36 million kg. A much larger population is indirectly dependent on the tea industry in the district. The average annual production including those from the plain areas, exceeds 10 million kg.

As of 2013, Darjeeling subdivision had 46 tea estates, Kalimpong subdivision had 29 tea estates and Kurseong subdivision had 6 tea gardens. This added up to 81 tea estates in the hill areas. Bannackburn Tea Estate and Lingia Tea Estate in Darjeeling were the first to come up in 1835. Siliguri subdivision in the terai region had 45 tea estates.

=== Banking ===
In 2012-13, Matigara CD block had offices of 9 commercial banks and 4 gramin banks.

== Transport ==
Matigara CD block has 5 originating/ terminating bus routes. The nearest railway station is 3 km from the block headquarters.

National Highway 110 /Hill Cart Road passes through Matigara CD block.

State Highway 12 passes through Matigara CD block.

== Education ==
In 2012-13, Matigara CD block had 120 primary schools with 15,022 students, 5 middle schools with 1,545 students, 7 high schools with 2,618 students and 7 higher secondary schools with 11,209 students. Matigara CD block had 3 general degree colleges with 3,618 students, 7 technical/ professional institutions with 2243 students, 392 institutions for special and non-formal education with 25,625 students

See also – Education in India

According to the 2011 census, in Matigara CD block, among the 59 inhabited villages, 3 villages did not have a school, 24 villages had two or more primary schools, 22 villages had at least 1 primary and 1 middle school and 16 villages had at least 1 middle and 1 secondary school.

== Healthcare ==
In 2013, Matigara CD block had 2 hospitals, 1 block primary health centres and 2 private nursing homes with total 599 beds and 83 doctors (excluding private bodies). It had 15 family welfare subcentres. 75,199 patients were treated indoor and 663,066 patients were treated outdoor in the hospitals, health centres and subcentres of the CD block.

Matigara Block Primary Health Centre, with 10 beds at Matigarahat, is the major government medical facility in the Matigara CD block.
