= Ghum, West Bengal =

Ghum
- Neighbourhood
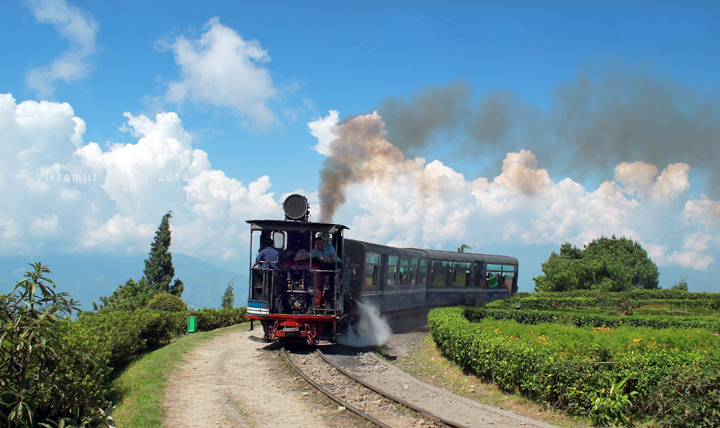
- Darjeeling to Ghoom Heritage Narrow Gauge Train

- Location in West Bengal, India
- Coordinates: 27°00′37″N 88°14′47″E
- Country: India
- State: West Bengal
- District: Darjeeling
- Elevation: 2,225 m (7,300 ft)
- Time zone: UTC+5:30 (IST)
- PIN: 734102
- Telephone code: 0354

Ghum (also spelt Ghoom) is a small hilly neighbourhood in the Darjeeling Himalayan hill region of West Bengal, India. It comes under ward number one of the Darjeeling Municipality. Ghum railway station of the Darjeeling Himalayan Railway is the highest railway station in India. It is situated at an altitude of 2,258 metres (7,407 ft). The place is the home of the Ghum Monastery and the Batasia Loop, a bend of the Darjeeling Himalayan Railway.

== Geography ==
Places and tea estates in the north-western portion of Darjeeling Sadar subdivision (including Darjeeling Pulbazar CD block) in Darjeeling district
CT: census town, R: rural/ urban centre, N: neighbourhood, H: hill centre, NP: national park/ wildlife sanctuary, TE: tea estate, TA: tourist attraction
Abbreviations used in names – TG for Tea Garden (town/village), TE for Tea Estate
Owing to space constraints in the small map, the actual locations in a larger map may vary slightly

=== Location ===
Ghum is located at 27°00′37″N 88°14′47″E.

=== Area overview ===
The map alongside shows the northern portion of the Darjeeling Himalayan hill region. Kangchenjunga, which rises with an elevation of 8,586 metres (28,169 ft) is located further north of the area shown. Sandakphu, rising to a height of 3,665 metres (12,024 ft), on the Singalila Ridge, is the highest point in West Bengal. In Darjeeling Sadar subdivision 61% of the total population lives in the rural areas and 39% of the population lives in the urban areas. There are 78 tea gardens/ estates (the figure varies slightly according to different sources), producing and largely exporting Darjeeling tea in the district. It engages a large proportion of the population directly/ indirectly. Some tea gardens were identified in the 2011 census as census towns or villages. Such places are marked in the map as CT (census town) or R (rural/ urban centre). Specific tea estate pages are marked TE.

Note: The map alongside presents some of the notable locations in the subdivision. All places marked in the map are linked in the larger full-screen map.

== War memorial ==
Darjeeling hills has a high concentration of Indian Army servicemen and ex-servicemen. Since independence in 1947, seventy-six soldiers of the Darjeeling area have died in service. In 1976, Manish Gupta, then Deputy Commissioner of Darjeeling, took the initiative to build a War Memorial and a committee was formed. In 1984, Batasia was selected as the site of the war memorial. In 1991, Subhas Ghising, chairman of Darjeeling Gorkha Autonomous Hill Council, agreed to finance the construction of the war memorial.

The war memorial consists of a sanctified raised oval platform, 37 by 24 feet (10 by 7 m), with a 9-foot (3 m) high bronze statue and a 30-foot (9 m) high triangular granite cenotaph, on a 3-foot (0.9 m) octagonal base, with the Roll of honour engraved on it. The bronze statue was sculptured by Gautam Pal of Krishnanagar.

== Monasteries ==
Yi Gha Choling Gompa is more popularly known as Ghum Monastery. located opposite to the Ghoom Post Office is a road called Monastery road which leads to Yiga Choling Monastery. Many travel guides and taxi drivers take tourist to the monastery located below Hill Cart road and Ghum Railway station which is Samten Choeling monastery and called it old Ghoom monastery as it is on the main road and easier for them. Yiga Choling Monastery is at an elevation of 8000 feet and is situated 8 km (5.0 mi) from Darjeeling . It was established in 1850 by the famous Mongolian astrologer and monk Sokpo Sherab Gyatso. He was later succeeded by very venerable late Khabje Domo Geshe Ngawang Kalsang Rinpoche. It was during Domo Geshi Rinpoche's tenure that the 15 feet high image of the great Maitreya Buddha was commissioned. It still stands majestically inside the main monastery for all to glimpse and pay respects. There are three other gompas in Ghum: Samten Choeling, the Sakyachoeling, and the Phin.

== Ghum Hill ==
On the Ghum-Sukhiapokri road, at an altitude of 7,900 feet (2,400 m) stands a huge detached rock offering a grand view of the Balsan Valley and the hills beyond. Garg World, an amusement park is the latest attraction.

== Transport ==
Ghum is the meeting point of several roads. The Hill Cart Road from Siliguri to Darjeeling runs through the town. It is 6 km (3.7 mi) from Darjeeling, 24 km (15 mi) from Kurseong via Sonada, and about 45 km (28 mi) via Lopchu. Another road leads to Mongpu and thence to the Kalimpong-Siliguri road. There is a road to Kurseong via Dow Hill. Sukhiapokhri, almost on the India-Nepal border, is 11 km (6.8 mi) on the road to Mirik.

== Education ==
Ghoom Jorebunglow College was established in 2004 at Ghum. It offers honours courses in Nepali, English, history, geography, political science, economics, sociology, education and a general course in arts.

Ghoom Boys School is a private boys only higher secondary school.

Ghoom Girls Higher Secondary School is an English-medium girls only institution with facilities for teaching from class V to class XII.

== Healthcare ==
There is a primary health centre, with 6 beds at Ghum.

== Ghum picture gallery ==
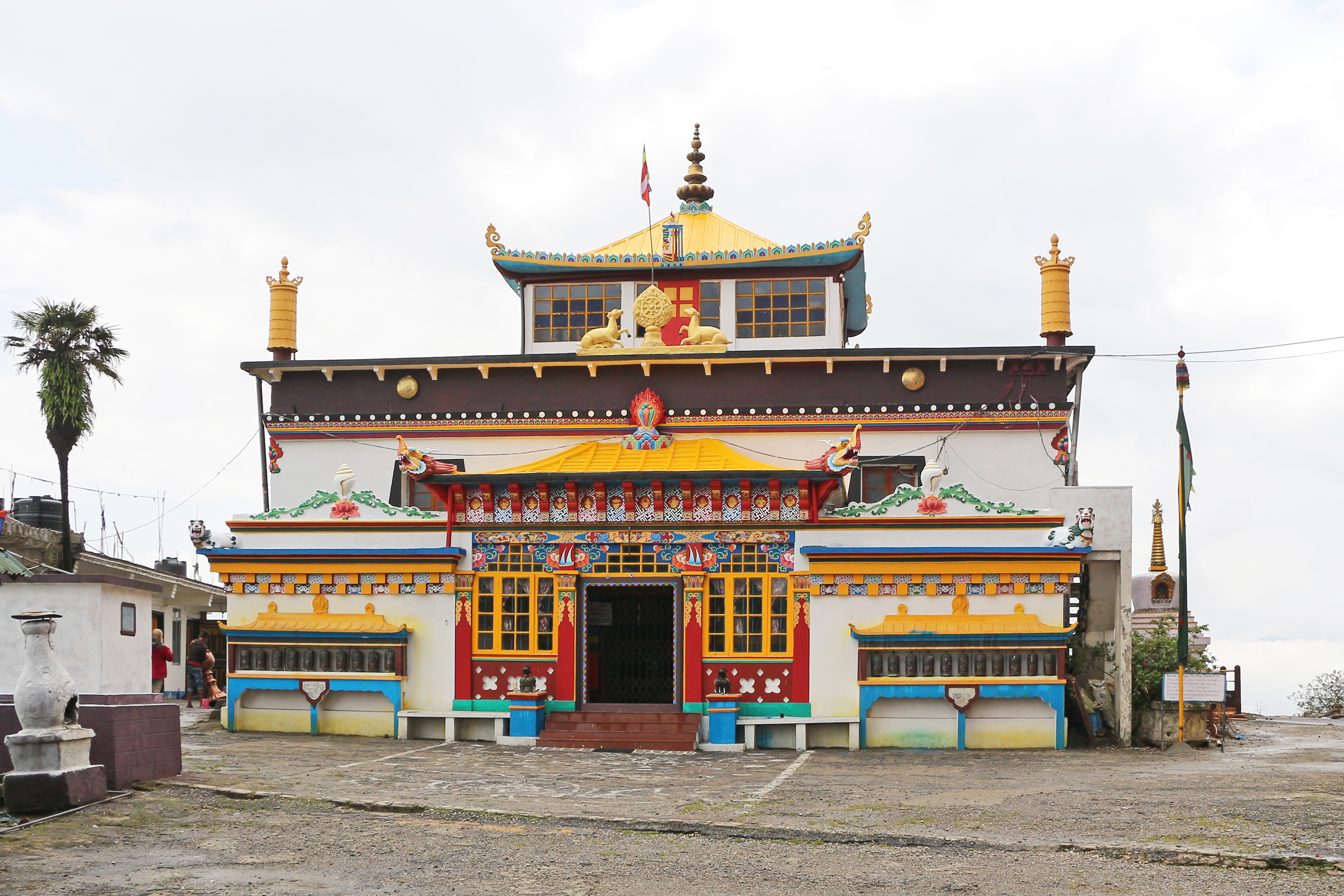
Yiga Choeling Monastery

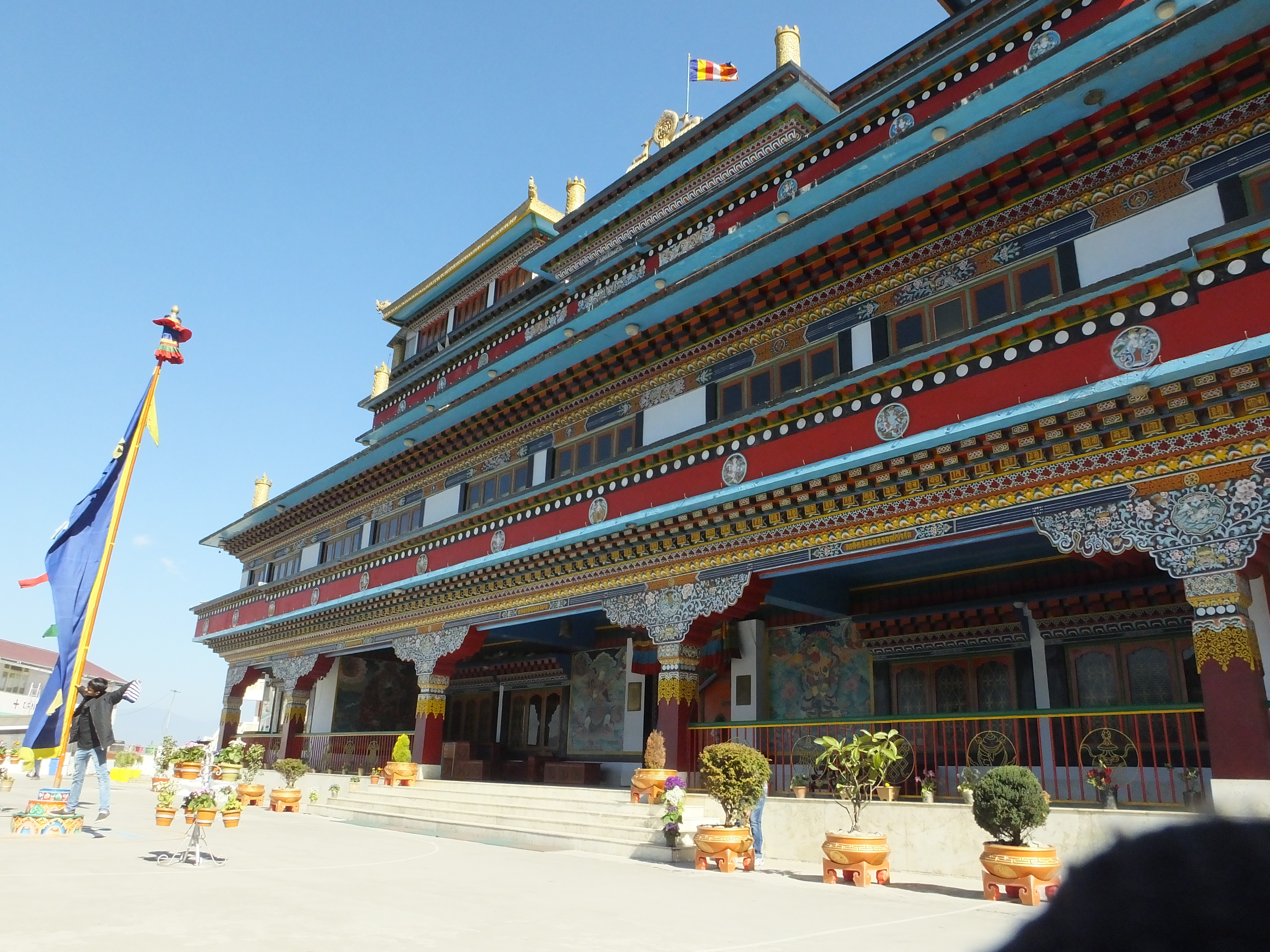
Ghoom Monastery, Darjeeling, 2017

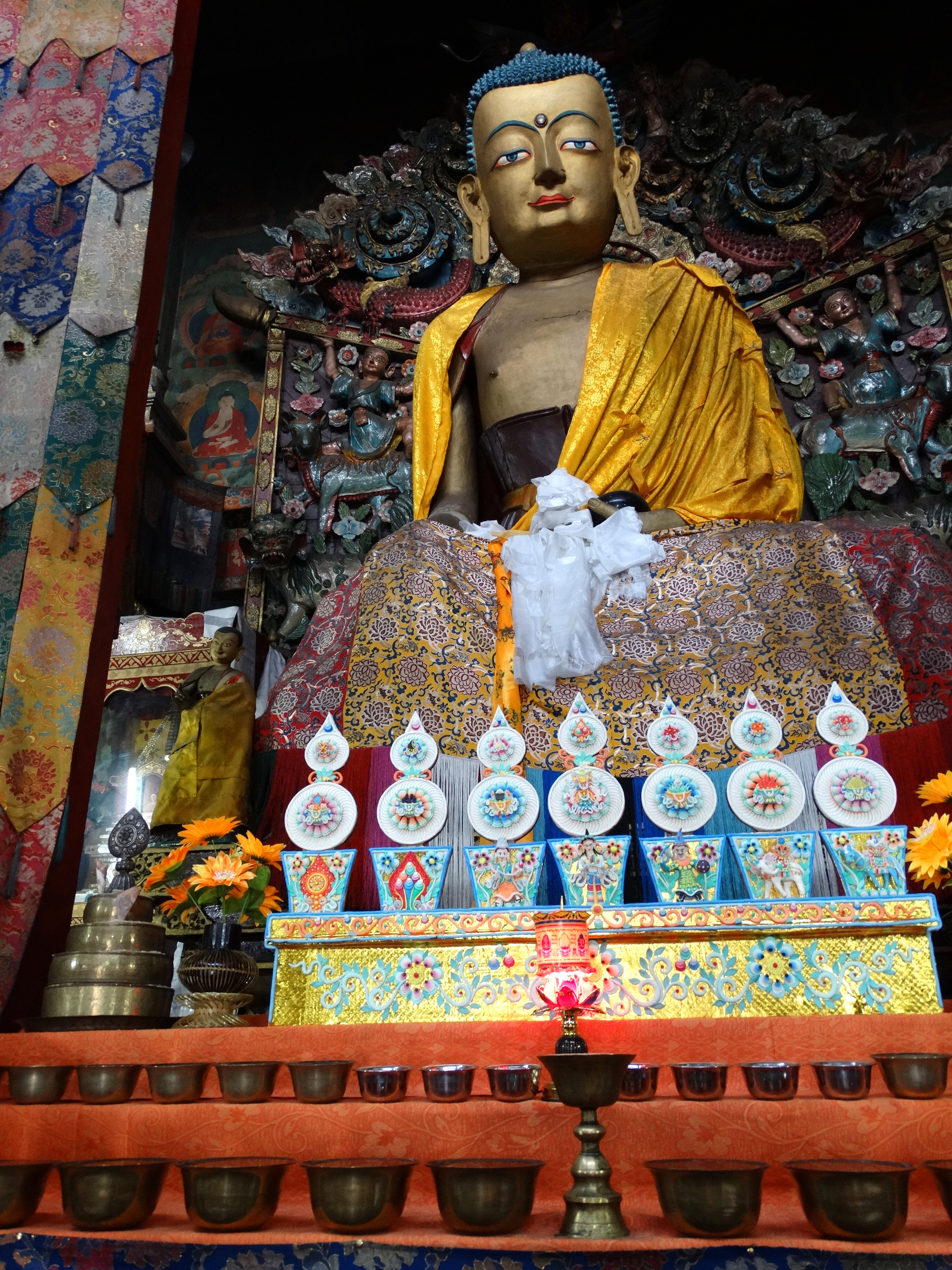
Buddha statue in Samten Choling Monastery

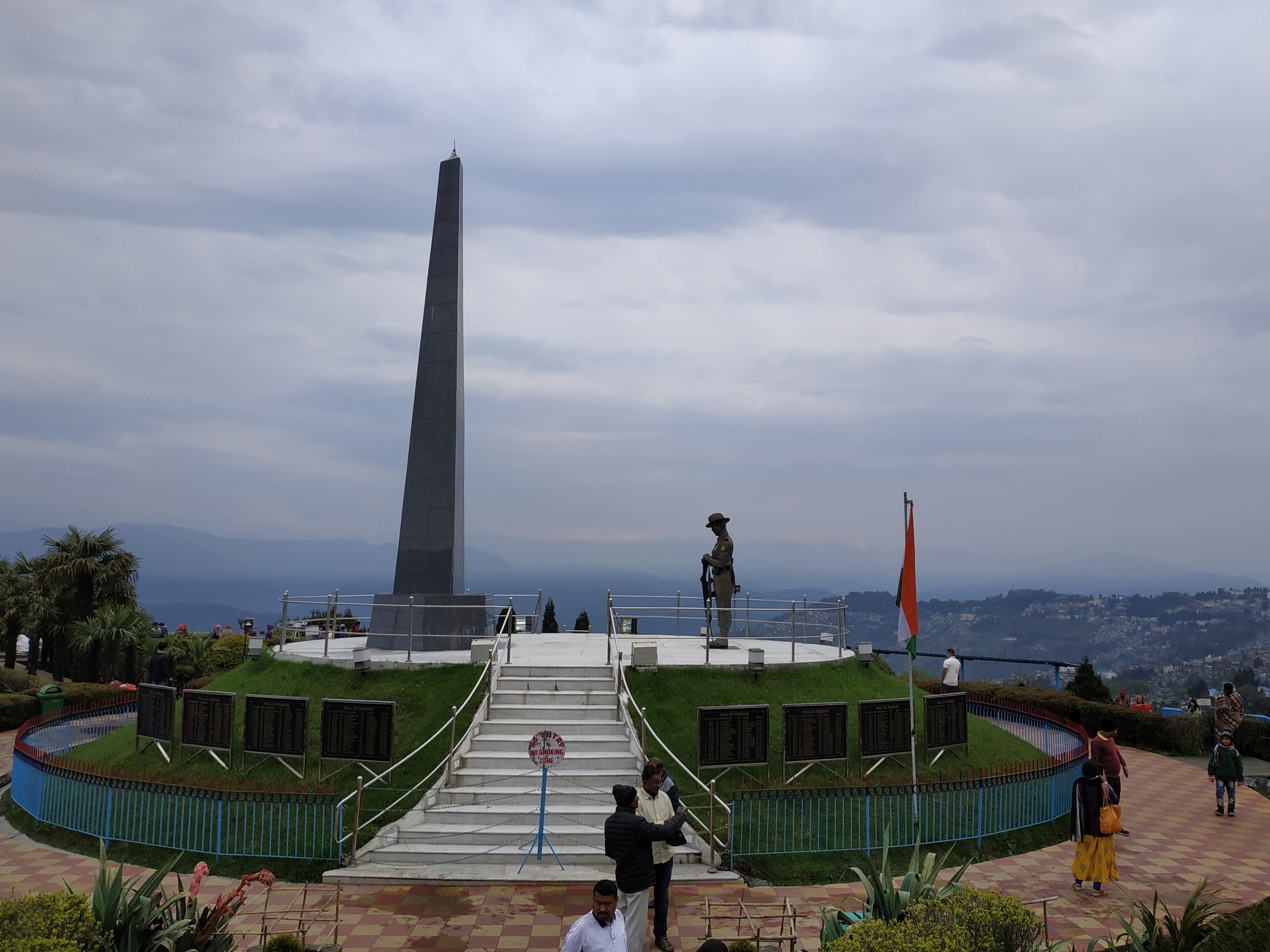
Batasia Loop War Memorial

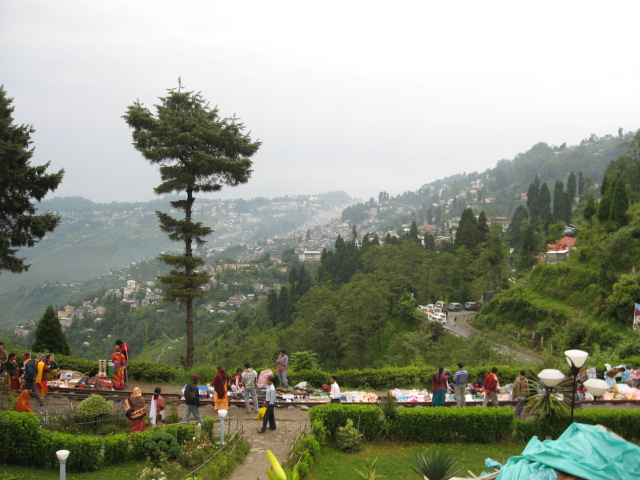
View from Batasia loop

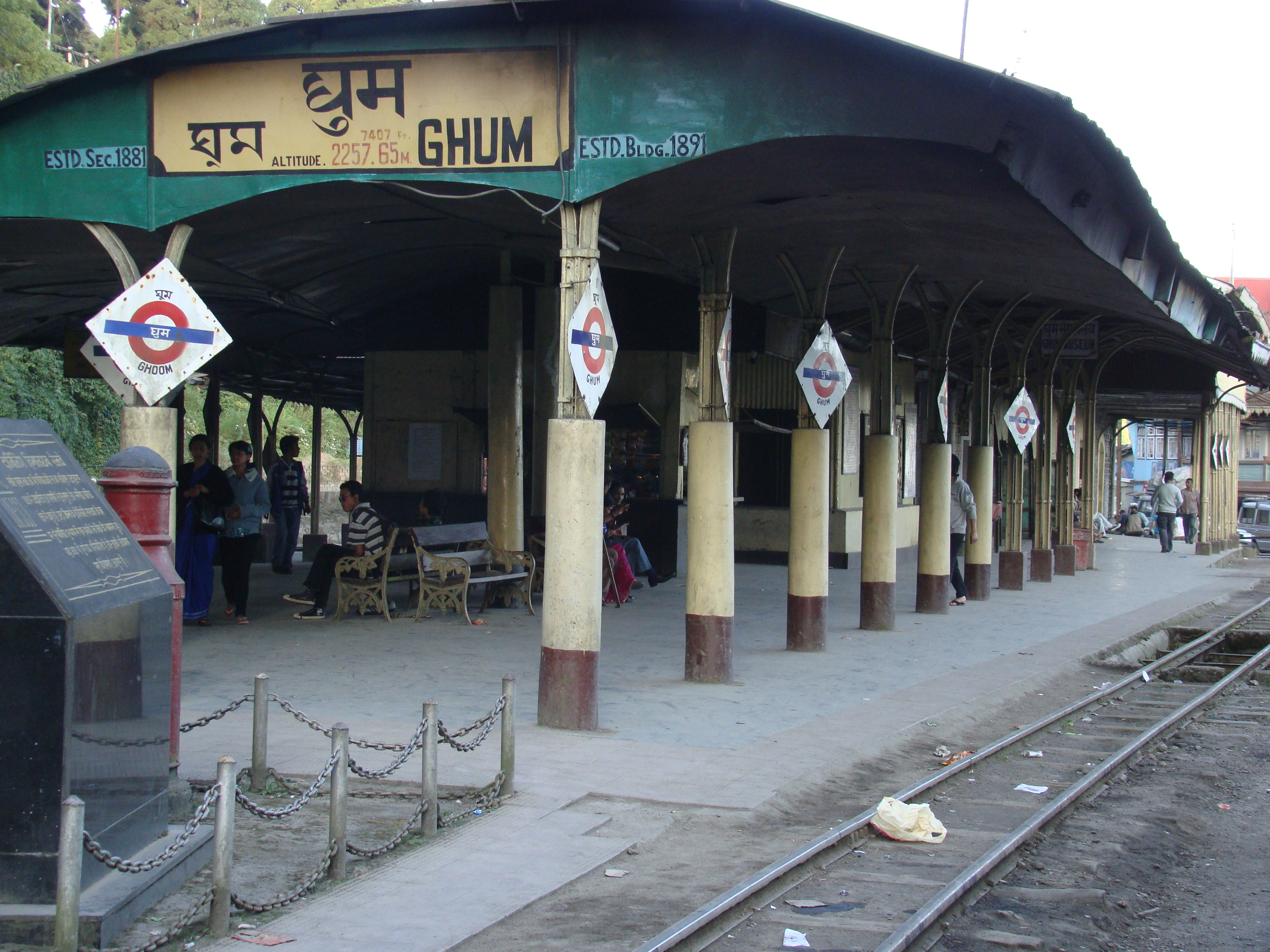
Ghum railway station

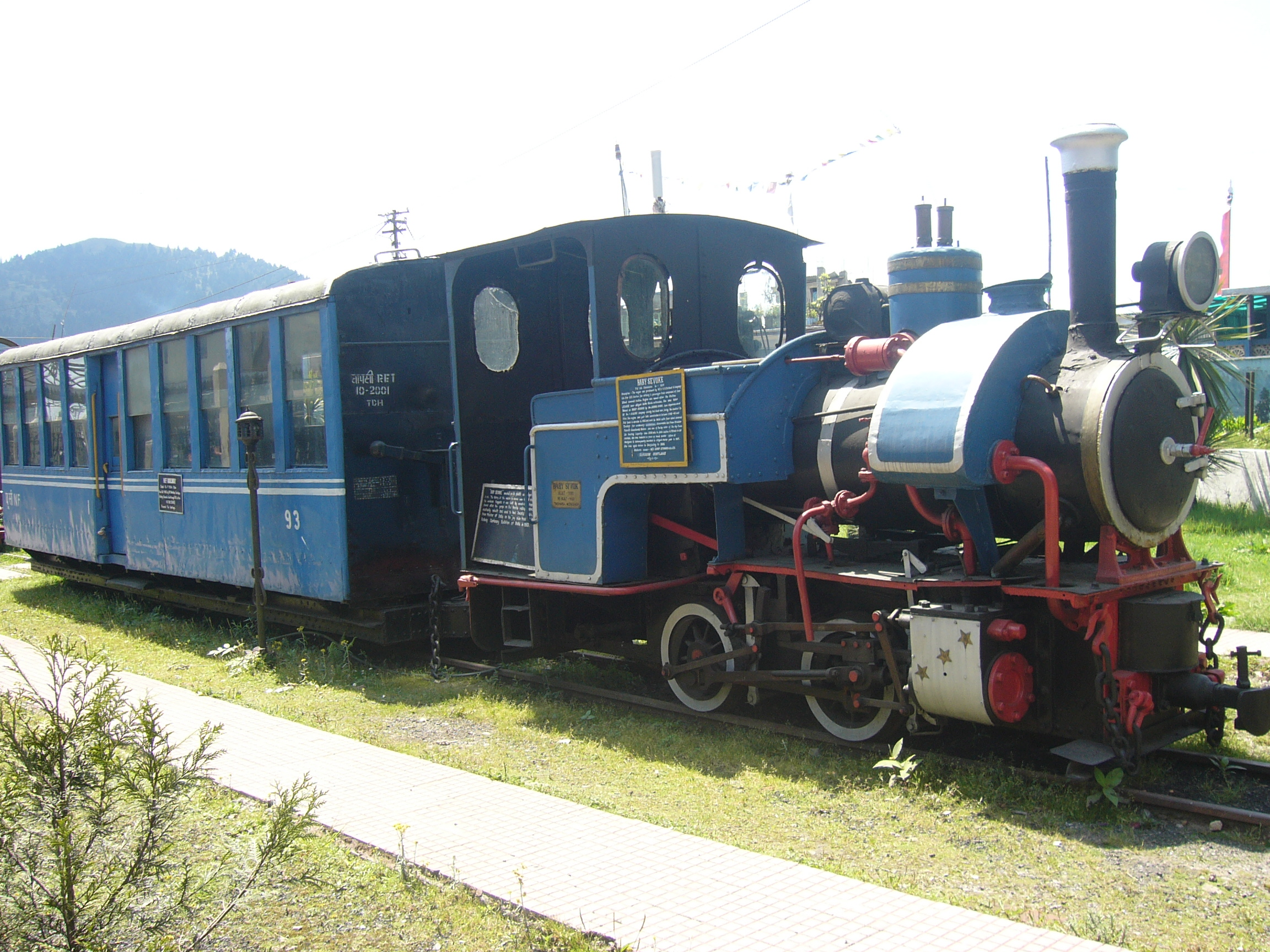
Darjeeling Himalayan Railway - toy train

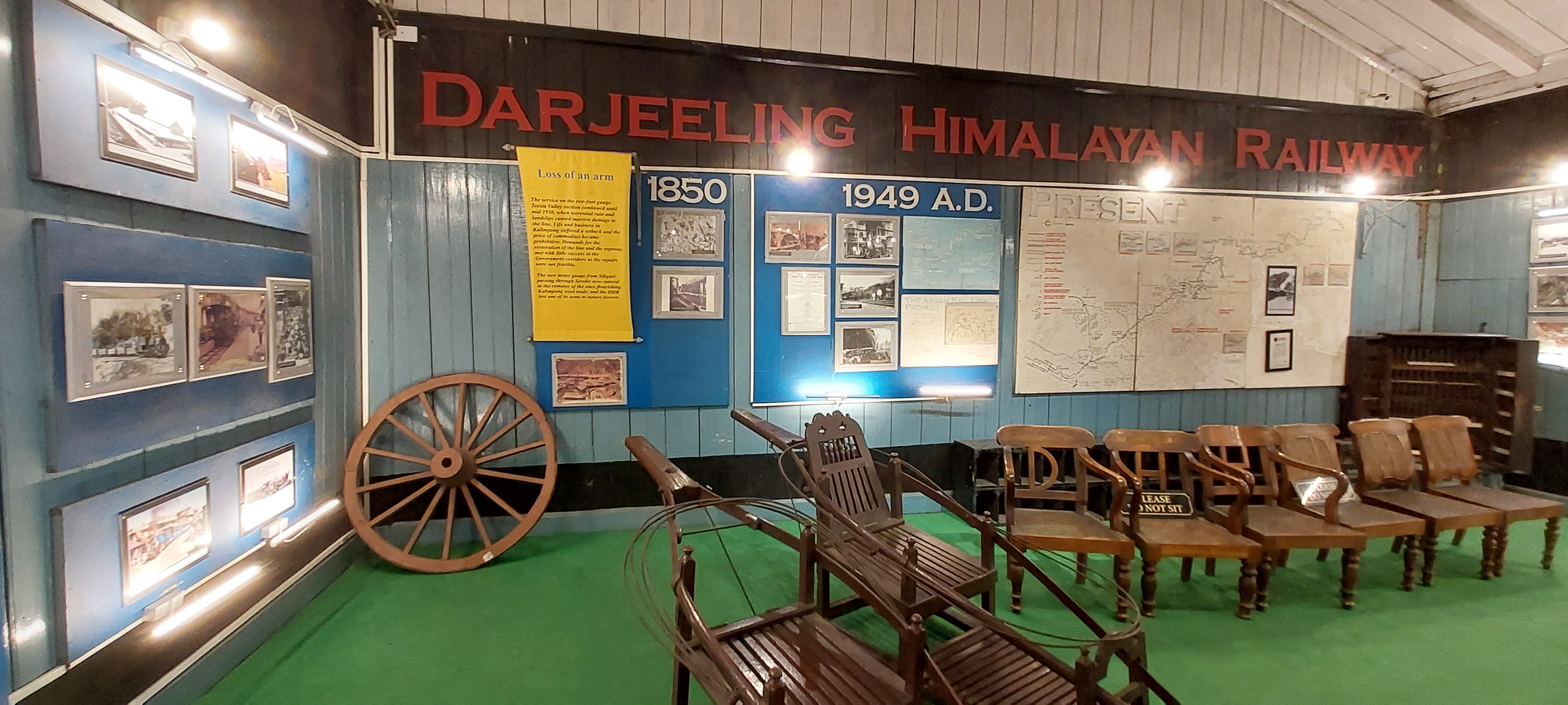
Ghum railway museums
