= Matigara-Naxalbari Assembly constituency =

Matigara–Naxalbari (SC)
- Constituency No. 25 for the West Bengal Legislative Assembly
- Interactive Map Outlining Matigara-Naxalbari (SC) Assembly Constituency

Constituency details
- Country: India
- Region: East India
- State: West Bengal
- District: Darjeeling
- Lok Sabha constituency: Darjeeling
- Established: 2011
- Total electors: 270,154
- Reservation: SC

Member of Legislative Assembly
- 18th West Bengal Legislative Assembly
- Incumbent Anandamay Barman
- Party: Bharatiya Janata Party
- Elected year: 2026
- Preceded by: Shankar Malakar

Matigara–Naxalbari (SC) Assembly constituency is an assembly constituency in Darjeeling district in the Indian state of West Bengal. It is reserved for Scheduled Castes.

Most Successful parties from Matigara-Naxalbari (SC) assembly constituency
1. Indian National Congress (2 times) (50.0%)
2. Bharatiya Janata Party (2 times) (50.0%)

== Overview ==
As per orders of the Delimitation Commission, No. 25 Matigara-Naxalbari Assembly constituency (SC) covers Naxalbari community development block, and Atharakhai, Champasari (excluding villages Sitong Forest, Sivoke Hill Forest and Sivoke Forest), Matigara I, Matigara II, Patharghata gram panchayats of Matigara community development block.

Matigara-Naxalbari Assembly constituency is part of No. 4 Darjeeling (Lok Sabha constituency).

== Members of the Legislative Assembly ==
Year	Member	Party
2011	Sankar Malakar	Indian National Congress
2016	Sankar Malakar	Indian National Congress
2021	Anandamoy Barman	Bharatiya Janata Party
2026	Anandamoy Barman	Bharatiya Janata Party

== Election results ==
Vote share of Winning Candidates
Year	Percent
2026	66.50%
2021	58.10%
2016	41.28%
2011	45.19%

=== 2026 ===
In the 2026 West Bengal Legislative Assembly election, Anandamoy Barman of BJP defeated his nearest rival Sankar Malakar of TMC by 104,265 votes.In the 2026 elections, he emerged as the candidate with the second largest victory margin in the entire state of West Bengal.

2026 West Bengal Legislative Assembly election: Matigara-Naxalbari (SC)
Party	Candidate	Votes	%	±%
BJP	Anandamay Barman	166,905	66.5	▲8.4
AITC	Shankar Malakar	62,640	24.96	▼3.69
CPI(M)	Jharen Roy	8,585	3.42	
INC	Amitava Sarkar	5,498	2.19	▼7.39
NOTA	None of the above	1,811	0.72	▼0.91
Majority		104,265	41.54	▲12.09
Turnout		250,985	92.9	▲9.24
BJP hold		Swing	6.04	

=== 2021 ===
In the 2021 West Bengal Legislative Assembly election, Anandamoy Barman of BJP defeated his nearest rival Rajen Sundas of TMC.

2021 West Bengal Legislative Assembly election: Matigara-Naxalbari (SC) constituency
Party	Candidate	Votes	%	±%
BJP	Anandamoy Barman	139,785	58.1	
AITC	Rajen Sundas	68,937	28.65	
INC	Sankar Malakar	23,060	9.58	
NOTA	None of the above	3,912	1.63	
Majority		70,848	29.45	
Turnout		240,591	83.66	
BJP gain from INC		Swing		

=== 2016 ===
In the 2016 West Bengal Legislative Assembly election, Sankar Malakar of Congress defeated his nearest rival Amar Sinha of TMC.

2016 West Bengal Legislative Assembly election: Matigara-Naxalbari (SC) constituency
Party	Candidate	Votes	%	±%
INC	Sankar Malakar	86,441	41.28	▼3.91
AITC	Amar Sinha	67,814	32.39	
BJP	Anandamoy Barman	44,625	21.31	▲16.84
KPP	Bidur Barman	2,464	1.18	
BSP	Sudip Mandal	1,849	0.88	
Independent	Goutam Kirtania	1,739	0.83	
SUCI(C)	Kshitish Chandra Roy	1,138	0.54	
NOTA	None of the Above	3,307	1.58	
Majority		18,627	8.90	▲4.74
Turnout		209,377	83.95	
INC hold		Swing		

=== 2011 ===
In the 2011 West Bengal Legislative Assembly election, Sankar Malakar of Congress defeated his nearest rival Jharen Roy of CPI(M).

2011 West Bengal Legislative Assembly election: Matigara-Naxalbari (SC) constituency
Party	Candidate	Votes	%	±%
INC	Sankar Malakar	74,334	45.19	
CPI(M)	Jharen Roy	67,501	41.04	
KPP	Atul Chandra Roy	11,906	7.24	
BJP	Asim Sarkar	7,351	4.47	
CPI(ML)L	Dipu Haldar	3,391	2.06	
Majority		6,833	4.16	
Turnout		1,64,483	84.76	
INC win (new seat)				
