= Longview Tea Garden =

- Village
- Location in West Bengal, India Longview Tea Garden (India)
- Coordinates: 26.816478°N 88.260652°E
- Country: India
- State: West Bengal
- District: Darjeeling

Population (2011)
  - Total: 5,301
- Time zone: UTC+5:30 (IST)
- PIN: 734217
- Telephone/STD code: 0353
- Lok Sabha constituency: Darjeeling
- Vidhan Sabha constituency: Kurseong
- Website: darjeeling.gov.in

Longview Tea Garden is a village in the Kurseong CD block in the Kurseong subdivision of the Darjeeling district in the state of West Bengal, India.

== History ==
Longview Tea Company was incorporated in 1879. In earlier days, Longview Tea Garden was owned by such companies as James Warren and Company. Another source says that that Longview Tea Estate was initially owned by a pioneering British tea planter C.G.Adams, who opened it in 1873. "Wyandhams of Australia owned the estate until 1953." Longview Tea Co. was taken over by the Dagas in 1954. The company started operations with a single tea garden – Longview Tea Garden. It subsequently took over five more gardens – Phuguri Tea Estate in Darjeeling (1954), Bhatpara Tea Estate in Dooars (1988), Orange Valley Tea Estate in Darjeeling (1990), the Sanyasithan Tea Estate in Terai (1991) and the Anandapur Tea Estate in the Dooars (1991). Towards the end of the last century, the company produced 30 lakh kg of all varieties of tea. It was a profit-making dividend paying company for years. During the financial year 1999–2000, on incurring losses, the company "practically sold all tea estates/projects and is driven by other activities/ sources."

Longview Tea Company sold Rohini Tea Estate to Sona Tea, Avongrove Tea Estate to Avon Tea, Longview Tea Garden to Ambari Tea and Phugri Tea Estate to the Bagarias. In 2000, the only garden left with the Longview Tea Company in Darjeeling district was Orange Valley Tea Estate. P.K.Daga, managing director of Longview Tea Company, said that they were no more interested in tea gardens in Darjeeling. He said, "It is individual garden owners who are thriving in Darjeeling, compared with the big corporates, because they can afford to give complete attention right from the production to marketing of the tea produced by them."

All 87 gardens producing Darjeeling Tea, were closed from 17 June 2017, when the Gorkha Janmukti Morcha announced the indefinite general strike. More than 500 workers, out of the total strength of 1,200, of Longview Tea Garden joined "voluntary work" on the 64th day of the strike.

== Geography ==
Places and tea estates in the north-eastern portion of Darjeeling Sadar subdivision (including Rangli Rangliot CD block) and Kurseong subdivision in Darjeeling district
CT: census town, R: rural/ urban centre, N: neighbourhood, H: hill centre, NP: national park/ wildlife sanctuary, TE: tea estate, TA: tourist attraction
Abbreviations used in names – TG for Tea Garden (town/village), TE for Tea Estate
Owing to space constraints in the small map, the actual locations in a larger map may vary slightly

=== Location ===
Longview Tea Garden is located at 26.816478°N 88.260652°E.

Out of the total area of 1,020 ha (2,500 acres) in Longview Tea Garden, tea is cultivated in 506 ha (1,250 acres). A majority of the tea leaves in this garden goes in for the production of black tea.

=== Area overview ===
The map alongside shows the eastern portion of the Darjeeling Himalayan hill region and a small portion of the terai region in its eastern and southern fringes, all of it in the Darjeeling district. In the Darjeeling Sadar subdivision 61.00% of the total population lives in the rural areas and 39.00% of the population lives in the urban areas. In the Kurseong subdivision 58.41% of the total population lives in the rural areas and 41.59% lives in the urban areas. There are 78 tea gardens/ estates (the figure varies slightly according to different sources), in the district, producing and largely exporting Darjeeling tea. It engages a large proportion of the population directly/ indirectly. Some tea gardens were identified in the 2011 census as census towns or villages. Such places are marked in the map as CT (census town) or R (rural/ urban centre). Specific tea estate pages are marked TE.

Note: The map alongside presents some of the notable locations in the subdivision. All places marked in the map are linked in the larger full screen map.

== Longview Tea Estate ==
Longview Tea Estate produces 700,000 kg of tea annually, which is around 10% of the total production of Darjeeling tea. Long stretches of tea gardens, belonging to Longview Tea Estate, are visible on both sides of the road, as one proceeds towards Pankhabari.

In 2008, a devastating fire burnt down the tea factory.

Around 2,000 workers work in tea estate.

== Demographics ==
According to the 2011 Census of India, Longview Tea Garden had a total population of 5,301 of which 2,651 (50%) were males and 2,650 (50%) were females. There were 536 persons in the age range of 0 to 6 years. The total number of literate people in Longview Tea Garden was 3,571 (67.36% of the population over 6 years).

== Education ==
Pankhabari High School is an English-medium coeducational institution established in 1964. It has facilities for teaching from class V to class XII. It has 10 computers and a library with 3,664 books.
