= Gayabari =

- Tea estate village
- Location within West Bengal Location within India
- Coordinates: 26.8587°N 88.3154°E
- Country: India
- State: West Bengal
- District: Darjeeling
- Lok Sabha constituency: Darjeeling
- Vidhan Sabha constituency: Kurseong
- Administrative Body: Gorkhaland Territorial Administration
- PIN: 734223
- Telephone/STD code: 0353
- Website: darjeeling.gov.in

Gayabari (Nepali translation: The cowshed) is a tea garden village in the Kurseong CD block in the Kurseong subdivision of the Darjeeling District of West Bengal state, India.

== Geography ==
Gayabari Tea Garden village is administrated by Sarpanch (Head of Village) who is the elected representative of village.

- Postal pin code: 734223
- Postal head office: Tindharia.

=== Nearby cities & towns ===
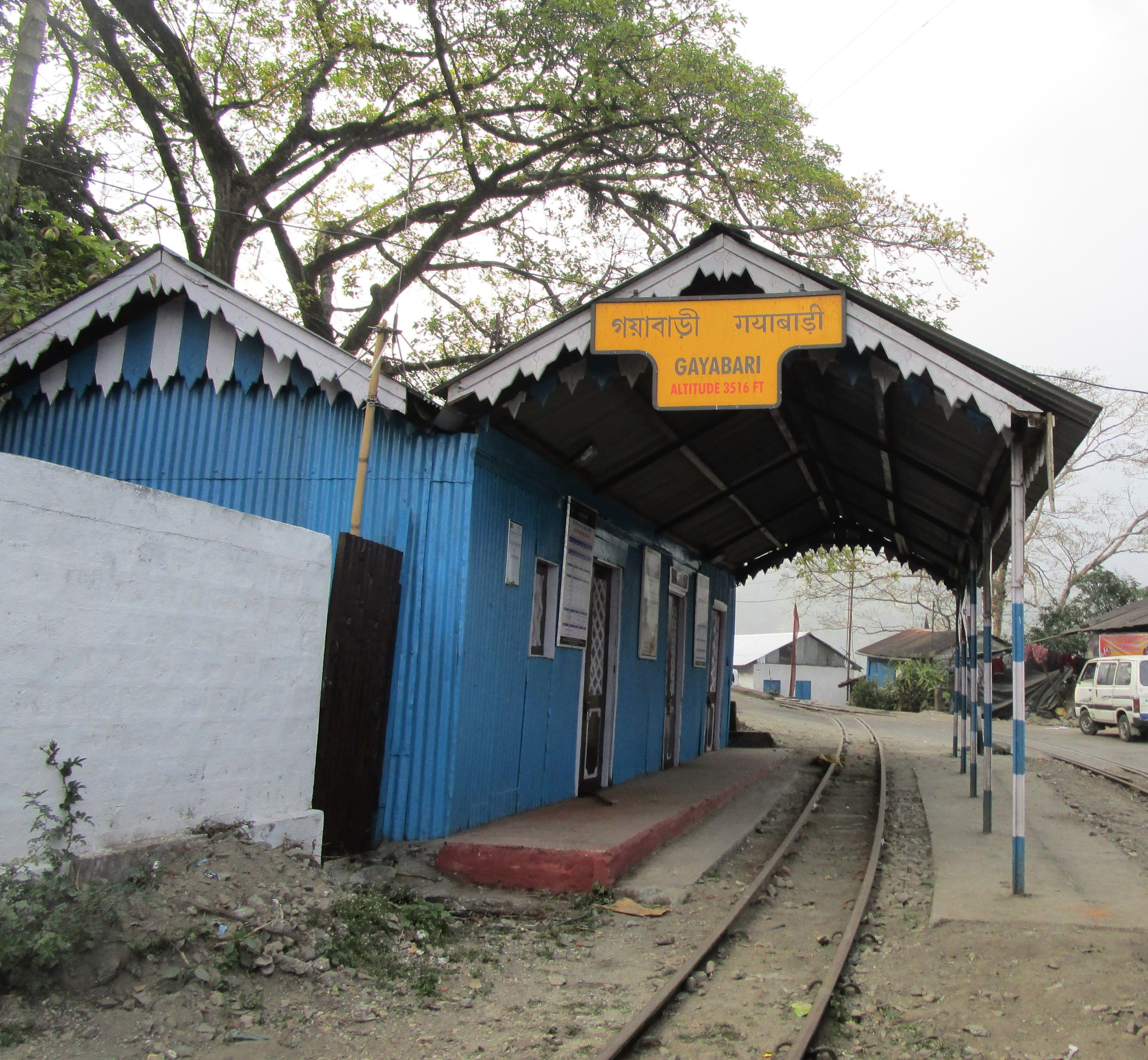
Gayabari Railway Station, Darjeeling

- Kurseong: 15 km
- Darjeeling: 44 km
- Siliguri: 26 km

== Demographics ==
As per Indian Population Census 2011, Gayabari Tea Garden has 99 families residing in the village and has a population of 460 of which 238 are males and 222 are females. Gayabari Tea Garden village has a higher literacy rate compared to the rest of West Bengal. The total geographical area of village is 236.34 hectares. Nepali is the main language spoken in Gayabari.

== Transport ==
The village is served by Gayabari railway station.

Service	Name	Location	Distance
Railway Station	Gayabari	Gayabari	0 km
Railway Station	Siliguri Junction	Siliguri	26 km
Railway Station	New Jalpaiguri Junction (NJP)	New Jalpaiguri	34 km
Airport	Bagdogra Airport	Bagdogra	37 km
Bus Terminal	Tenzing Norgay Bus Terminas	Siliguri	26 km

== Notable persons ==
- Yangdup Lama

== Education ==
Netaji Junior High School is an English-medium coeducational institution established in 1965. It has arrangements for teaching from class V to class X. It has 6 computers, a library with 344 books and a playground.

== Healthcare ==
There is a primary health centres at Gayabari, with 4 beds.
