= Goomtee Tea Estate =

Tea garden in India

- Interactive map of Goomtee Tea Estate
- Location: Darjeeling district, West Bengal, India
- Coordinates: 26.88562°N 88.32536°E
- Area: 225 hectares (560 acres)
- Elevation: 3,000 to 6,000 metres (9,800 to 19,700 ft)
- Owner: Ashok Kumar, Mahabir Prasad
- Open: 1899

Goomtee Tea Estate is a tea garden in the Kurseong CD block in the Kurseong subdivision of the Darjeeling district in the Indian state of West Bengal.

== History ==
Goomtee Tea Estate was planted by Henry Montgomery Lennox in 1899. It was subsequently managed by G.W.O’Brien, who was forced in the aftermath of the Second World War to sell it to the ruling Rana of Nepal. In the mid-1950s it was taken over by co-owners: the Kejriwal family and Mahabir Prasad.

== Geography ==
Places and tea estates in the north-eastern portion of Darjeeling Sadar subdivision (including Rangli Rangliot CD block) and Kurseong subdivision in Darjeeling district
CT: census town, R: rural/ urban centre, N: neighbourhood, H: hill centre, NP: national park/ wildlife sanctuary, TE: tea estate, TA: tourist attraction
Abbreviations used in names – TG for Tea Garden (town/village), TE for Tea Estate
Owing to space constraints in the small map, the actual locations in a larger map may vary slightly

=== Location ===
It is on National Highway 110 linking Siliguri with Darjeeling.

Other tea estates in the area are: Jungpana, Sivitar and Giddapahar.

Goomtee Tea Estate is spread over 110 hectares (270 acres), out of a total area of 225 hectares (560 acres) at an altitude ranging from 3,000 to 6,000 feet (910 to 1,830 m).

Note: The map alongside presents some of the notable locations in the subdivision. All places marked in the map are linked in the larger full screen map.

== Economy ==
Goomtee Tea Garden produces amongst finest qualities of Darjeeling tea. It employs 300 garden workers.

== Tourism ==
More than a century-old heritage bungalow of the British planters has been renovated and thrown open to tourists.
