= Rongmook Ceder Tea Garden =

- Census Town
- Location in West Bengal, India Rongmook Ceder Tea Garden (India)
- Coordinates: 26.9498°N 88.2383°E
- Country: India
- State: West Bengal
- District: Darjeeling

Area
  - Total: 7.1428 km^{2} (2.7579 sq mi)

Population (2011)
  - Total: 5,150
  - Density: 721/km^{2} (1,870/sq mi)
- Time zone: UTC+5:30 (IST)
- PIN: 734219
- Telephone/STD code: 0354
- Lok Sabha constituency: Darjeeling
- Vidhan Sabha constituency: Kurseong
- Website: darjeeling.gov.in

Rongmook Ceder Tea Garden is a census town in the Jorebunglow Sukhiapokhri CD block in the Darjeeling Sadar subdivision of the Darjeeling district in the state of West Bengal, India.

== Geography ==
Places and tea estates in the southern portion of Darjeeling Sadar subdivision (including Jorebunglow Sukhiapokhri CD block), and Mirik Subdivision in Darjeeling district
CT: census town, R: rural/ urban centre, NP: national park/ wildlife sanctuary, TE: tea estate
Abbreviations used in names – TG for Tea Garden (town/village), TE for Tea Estate
Owing to space constraints in the small map, the actual locations in a larger map may vary slightly

=== Location ===
Rongmook CederTea Garden is located at 26.9498°N 88.2383°E.

=== Area overview ===
The map alongside shows a part of the southern portion of the Darjeeling Himalayan hill region in the Darjeeling district. In the Darjeeling Sadar subdivision 61.00% of the total population lives in the rural areas and 39.00% of the population lives in the urban areas. In the Mirik subdivision 80.11% of the total population lives in the rural areas and 19.89% lives in the urban areas. There are 78 tea gardens/ estates (the figure varies slightly according to different sources), in the district, producing and largely exporting Darjeeling tea. It engages a large proportion of the population directly/ indirectly. Some tea gardens were identified in the 2011 census as census towns or villages. Such places are marked in the map as CT (census town) or R (rural/ urban centre). Specific tea estate pages are marked TE.

Note: The map alongside presents some of the notable locations in the subdivision. All places marked in the map are linked in the larger full screen map.

Geoffrey James Ower-Johnston
1970s and 1980s were times of trouble for the tea gardens. Most of the British owners left and went back to England. Geoffrey James Ower-Johnston, the owner of Rungmook Cedar Tea Estate, having long family links with the garden, was struggling to keep things going. Poor financial management, labour agitation and natural disasters had pushed the garden into the red. The workers were not being paid. In 1981, the state government had listed the garden as “sick” and certain legal procedures were continuing, when Geoffrey was mobbed and after some altercations, he handed over the gun he always carried and then was attacked with daggers and spears. He died and was buried in Darjeeling.

— Mandakini Arora

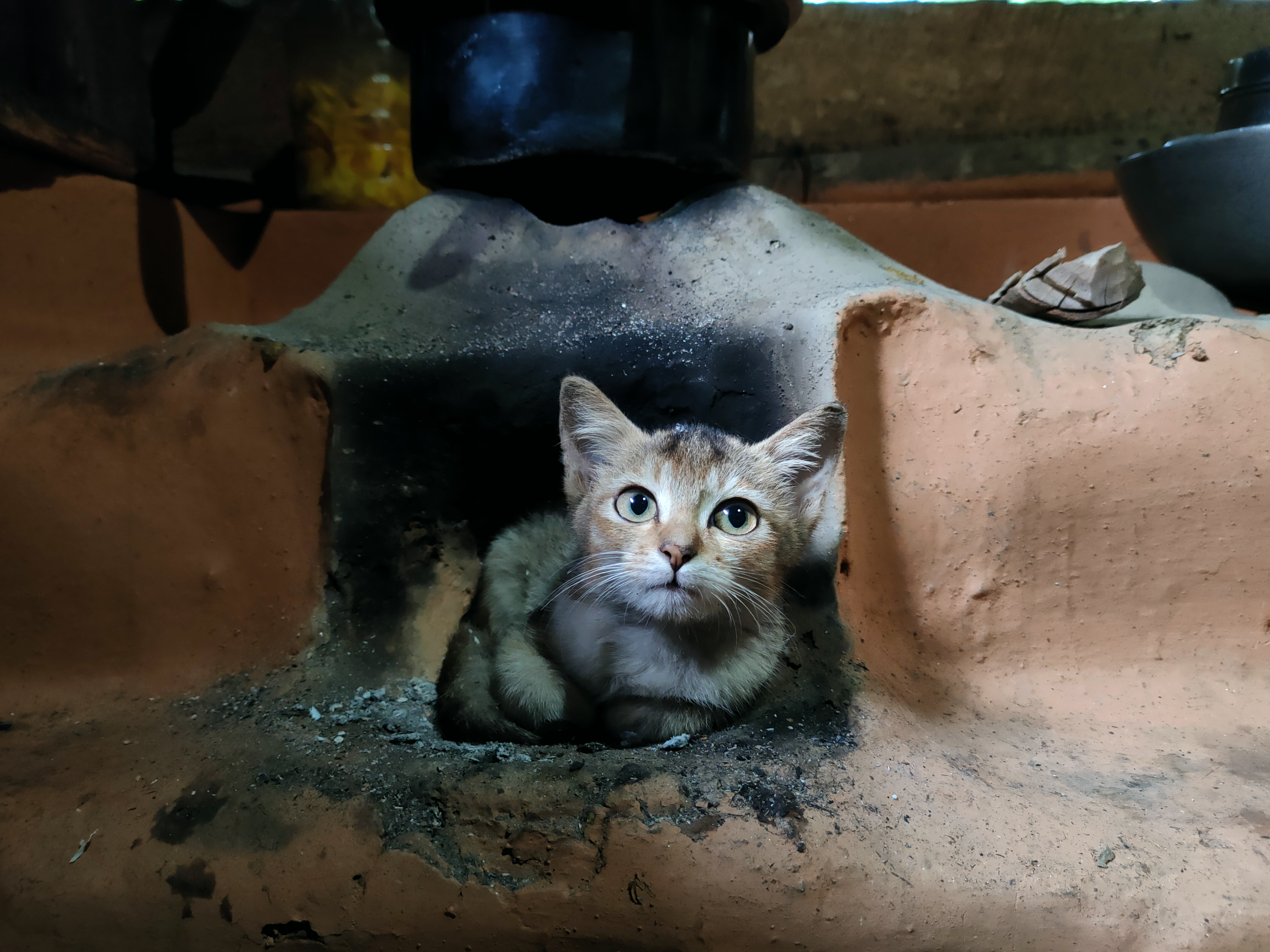
Cat sitting on traditional stove during winter seasons in Ceder Tea Garden.

== Demographics ==
According to the 2011 Census of India, Rongmook Ceder Tea Garden had a total population of 5,150 of which 2,528 (49%) were males and 2,622 (51%) were females. There were 423 persons in the age range of 0 to 6 years. The total number of literate people in Rongmook Ceder Tea Garden was 3,455 (67.09% of the population over 6 years).

== Infrastructure ==
According to the District Census Handbook 2011, Darjiling, Rongmook Ceder Tea Garden covered an area of 7.1428 km^{2}. Among the civic amenities, it had 8 km of roads with open drains, the protected water supply involved overhead tank and spring. It had 1,220 domestic electric connections. Among the educational facilities it had were 7 primary schools, 1 middle school, the nearest secondary and senior secondary schools at Pacherig Bazar 8 km away. It had 1 non-formal education centre (Sarva Siksha Abhiyan). An important commodity it manufactured was tea.

== Rungmook Cedar Tea Estate ==
Rungmook tea estate and Cedar tea estate, both planted in the mid-1800s, were merged in the early 1900s.

Rungmook Cedar Tea Estate was subsequently taken over by Darjeeling Organic Tea Estates Private Ltd., a company formed by Bansal, with the objective of reviving closed and sick tea gardens. The garden is located at a height of 5,500 ft (1,700 m). A large portion of the garden is forested.

=== DOTEPL group ===
The gardens of the Darjeeling Organic Tea Estates Private Ltd. are: Ambootia, Changtong, Happy Valley, Monteviot, Moondakotee, Mullootar, Nagri, Noorbong, Sepoydhurah (Chamling), Sivitar, Rangmook Ceder, Rangaroon, Pandam and Aloobari.
