= Monteviot Tea Garden =

- Village
- Location in West Bengal, India Monteviot Tea Garden (India)
- Coordinates: 26.8855°N 88.2693°E
- Country: India
- State: West Bengal
- District: Darjeeling

Population (2011)
  - Total: 743
- Time zone: UTC+5:30 (IST)
- Lok Sabha constituency: Darjeeling
- Vidhan Sabha constituency: Kurseong
- Website: darjeeling.gov.in

Monteviot Tea Garden is a village in the Kurseong CD block in the Kurseong subdivision of the Darjeeling district in the state of West Bengal, India.

== Etymology ==
The name "Monteviot" is derived from a French word meaning 'rock'.

== History ==
Monteviot Tea Garden was established in 1856.

The ailing tea garden was taken over by the Ambootia group and brought back to life.

== Geography ==
Places and tea estates in the north-eastern portion of Darjeeling Sadar subdivision (including Rangli Rangliot CD block) and Kurseong subdivision in Darjeeling district
CT: census town, R: rural/ urban centre, N: neighbourhood, H: hill centre, NP: national park/ wildlife sanctuary, TE: tea estate, TA: tourist attraction
Abbreviations used in names – TG for Tea Garden (town/village), TE for Tea Estate
Owing to space constraints in the small map, the actual locations in a larger map may vary slightly

=== Location ===
Monteviot Tea Garden is located at 26.8858°N 88.2693°E. Monteviot Tea Garden with an area of 88 hectares (220 acres) is an organic Darjeeling tea garden in the north Kurseong valley at an altitude ranging from 950 to 1,700 metres (3,120 to 5,580 ft). It produces Green tea. In 2004, the tea factory was completely burnt down.

=== Area overview ===
The map alongside shows the eastern portion of the Darjeeling Himalayan hill region and a small portion of the terai region in its eastern and southern fringes, all of it in the Darjeeling district. In the Darjeeling Sadar subdivision 61.00% of the total population lives in the rural areas and 39.00% of the population lives in the urban areas. In the Kurseong subdivision 58.41% of the total population lives in the rural areas and 41.59% lives in the urban areas. There are 78 tea gardens/ estates (the figure varies slightly according to different sources), in the district, producing and largely exporting Darjeeling tea. It engages a large proportion of the population directly/ indirectly. Some tea gardens were identified in the 2011 census as census towns or villages. Such places are marked in the map as CT (census town) or R (rural/ urban centre). Specific tea estate pages are marked TE.

Note: The map alongside presents some of the notable locations in the subdivision. All places marked in the map are linked in the larger full screen map.

== Demographics ==
According to the 2011 Census of India, Montiviot Tea Garden had a total population of 743 of which 357 (48%) were males and 386 (52%) were females. There were 40 persons in the age range of 0 to 6 years. The total number of literate people in Montiviot was 616 (82.91% of the population over 6 years).

== DOTEPL group ==
The gardens of the Darjeeling Organic Tea Estates Private Ltd. are: Ambootia, Changtong, Happy Valley, Monteviot, Moondakotee, Mullootar, Nagri, Noorbong, Sepoydhurah (Chamling), Sivitar, Rangmook Ceder, Rangaroon, Pandam and Aloobari.
