= Jungpana Tea Estate =

Tea garden in Kurseong, Darjeeling, India

- Interactive map of Jungpana Tea Estate
- Location: Darjeeling district, West Bengal, India
- Coordinates: 26.900597°N 88.322767°E
- Area: 78 acres (32 ha)
- Elevation: 1,000 to 1,500 metres (3,300 to 4,900 ft)
- Open: 1899

Jungpana Tea Estate is a tea garden in the Kurseong CD block in the Kurseong subdivision of the Darjeeling district in the Indian state of West Bengal.

== History ==
Jungpana Tea Estate was planted by Henry Montgomery Lennox in 1899. It was subsequently managed by G.W.O’Brien, who was forced in the aftermath of the Second World War to sell it to the ruling Rana of Nepal. The Kejriwal family took it over around 1956. After the strikes in 2017, the businessman Sanjay Agarwal bought the estate to finally sell it out soon after to the Santosh Kumar Kanoria Group.

== Geography ==
Places and tea estates in the north-eastern portion of Darjeeling Sadar subdivision (including Rangli Rangliot CD block) and Kurseong subdivision in Darjeeling district
CT: census town, R: rural/ urban centre, N: neighbourhood, H: hill centre, NP: national park/ wildlife sanctuary, TE: tea estate, TA: tourist attraction
Abbreviations used in names – TG for Tea Garden (town/village), TE for Tea Estate
Owing to space constraints in the small map, the actual locations in a larger map may vary slightly

=== Location ===
It is around 12 km from Kurseong in a rather remote and isolated place, not accessible by any motorable road. It is connected through a snaking pathway, accessible only on foot. More than 350 steep steps leads to a footbridge across a small stream, Changey Khola. Across the stream, the pathway leads to the garden tea factory. Tea estates in the surrounding areas are: Goomtee Tea Estate, Sivitar Tea Estate and Mahalderm Tea Estate

Jungpana Tea Estate is spread over 78 acres (32 ha), at an altitude ranging from 1,000 to 1,500 metres (3,300 to 4,900 ft)

Note: The map alongside presents some of the notable locations in the subdivision. All places marked in the map are linked in the larger full screen map.

== Economy ==
Apart from being promoted by Britain’s royal family, Darjeeling tea from Jungpana is sold by Fortnum & Mason, U.K., Harrods of Knightsbridge, U.K.Mariage, France and Fauchon, France. Jungpana tea is one of the best sold brands.Nestlé markets Jungpana under its special tea brand in France, Switzerland, Germany and Japan. Shantanu Kejriwal, the third generation owner, feels that the international success is because of “careful ownership and understanding of the plantation.”

== The human side ==
Jungpana has faced adversities at home. The Gorkha Janmukti Morcha-supported trade union has at times posed problems.

Lassi Tamang was the first woman factory manager at Jungpana Tea Estate.
