= Mangarjung Tea Garden (Nagri) =

- Census Town
- Location in West Bengal, India Mangarjung Tea Garden (Nagri) (India)
- Coordinates: 26.9248°N 88.1895°E
- Country: India
- State: West Bengal
- District: Darjeeling

Area
  - Total: 5.524 km^{2} (2.133 sq mi)

Population (2011)
  - Total: 5,644
  - Density: 1,022/km^{2} (2,646/sq mi)
- Time zone: UTC+5:30 (IST)
- PIN: 734215
- Telephone/STD code: 0354
- Lok Sabha constituency: Darjeeling
- Vidhan Sabha constituency: Kurseong
- Website: darjeeling.gov.in

Mangarjung Tea Garden (Nagri) is a census town in the Jorebunglow Sukhiapokhri CD block in the Darjeeling Sadar subdivision of the Darjeeling district in the state of West Bengal, India.

== Geography ==
Places and tea estates in the southern portion of Darjeeling Sadar subdivision (including Jorebunglow Sukhiapokhri CD block), and Mirik Subdivision in Darjeeling district
CT: census town, R: rural/ urban centre, NP: national park/ wildlife sanctuary, TE: tea estate
Abbreviations used in names – TG for Tea Garden (town/village), TE for Tea Estate
Owing to space constraints in the small map, the actual locations in a larger map may vary slightly

=== Location ===
Mangarjung Tea Garden (Nagri) is located at 26.9248°N 88.1895°E.

=== Area overview ===
The map alongside shows a part of the southern portion of the Darjeeling Himalayan hill region in the Darjeeling district. In the Darjeeling Sadar subdivision 61.00% of the total population lives in the rural areas and 39.00% of the population lives in the urban areas. In the Mirik subdivision 80.11% of the total population lives in the rural areas and 19.89% lives in the urban areas. There are 78 tea gardens/ estates (the figure varies slightly according to different sources), in the district, producing and largely exporting Darjeeling tea. It engages a large proportion of the population directly/ indirectly. Some tea gardens were identified in the 2011 census as census towns or villages. Such places are marked in the map as CT (census town) or R (rural/ urban centre). Specific tea estate pages are marked TE.

Note: The map alongside presents some of the notable locations in the subdivision. All places marked in the map are linked in the larger full screen map.

== Demographics ==
According to the 2011 Census of India, Mangarjung Tea Garden (Nagri) had a total population of 5,644 of which 2,758 (49%) were males and 2,886 (51%) were females. There were 490 persons in the age range of 0 to 6 years. The total number of literate people in Mangarjung Tea Garden was 4,090 (72.47% of the population over 6 years).

== Infrastructure ==
According to the District Census Handbook 2011, Darjiling, Mangarjung Tea Garden (Nagri) covered an area of 5.524 km^{2}. Among the civic amenities, the protected water supply involved overhead tank and spring. It had 400 domestic electric connections. Among the medical facilities it had 1 medicine shop. Among the educational facilities it had were 7 primary schools, 1 middle school, the nearest secondary and senior secondary schools at Nagri Tea Estate 3 km away. It had 16 non-formal education centres (Sarva Siksha Abhiyan). An important commodity it manufactured was tea.

== Economy ==
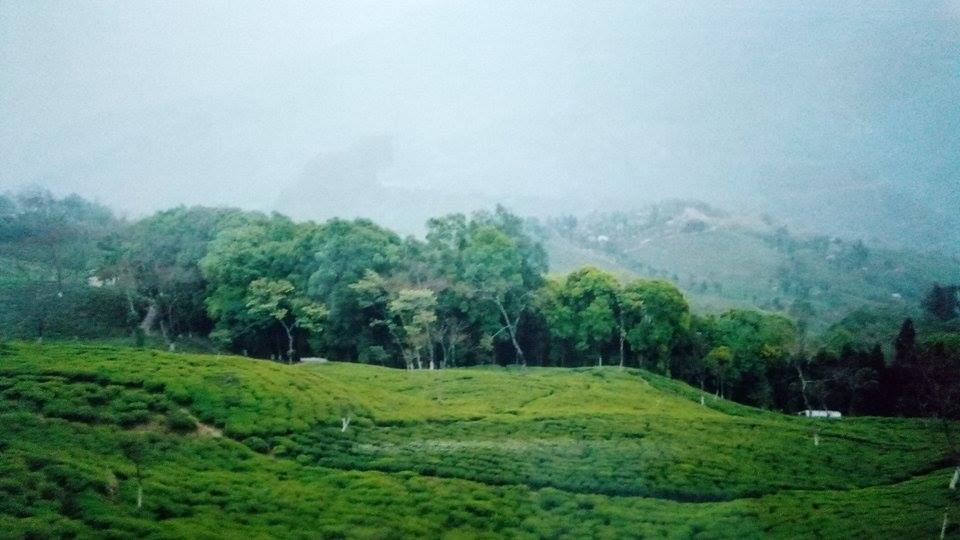
A Tea garden at Nagri, Darjeeling

=== DOTEPL group ===
The gardens of the Darjeeling Organic Tea Estates Private Ltd. are: Ambootia, Changtong, Happy Valley, Monteviot, Moondakotee, Mullootar, Nagri, Noorbong, Sepoydhurah (Chamling), Sivitar, Rangmook Ceder, Rangaroon, Pandam and Aloobari.

== Education ==
Indira Ojha High School is an English-medium coeducational institution established in 1986. It has facilities for teaching from class V to class X.
