= Chongtong Tea Garden =

- Census Town
- Location in West Bengal, India Chongtong Tea Garden (India)
- Coordinates: 27.0602°N 88.1998°E
- Country: India
- State: West Bengal
- District: Darjeeling

Area
  - Total: 6.8109 km^{2} (2.6297 sq mi)

Population (2011)
  - Total: 5,802
  - Density: 851.9/km^{2} (2,206/sq mi)
- Time zone: UTC+5:30 (IST)
- PIN: 734102
- Telephone/STD code: 0354
- Lok Sabha constituency: Darjeeling
- Vidhan Sabha constituency: Darjeeling
- Website: darjeeling.gov.in

Chongtong Tea Garden is a census town in the Darjeeling Pulbazar CD block in the Darjeeling Sadar subdivision of the Darjeeling district in the state of West Bengal, India.

== Geography ==
Places and tea estates in the north-western portion of Darjeeling Sadar subdivision (including Darjeeling Pulbazar CD block) in Darjeeling district
CT: census town, R: rural/ urban centre, N: neighbourhood, H: hill centre, NP: national park/ wildlife sanctuary, TE: tea estate, TA: tourist attraction
Abbreviations used in names – TG for Tea Garden (town/village), TE for Tea Estate
Owing to space constraints in the small map, the actual locations in a larger map may vary slightly

=== Location ===
Chongtong Tea Garden is located at 27.0602°N 88.1998°E. Chongtong Tea garden is located near Bijanbari/ Pulbazar and is 13 km from Darjeeling.

=== Area overview ===
The map alongside shows the northern portion of the Darjeeling Himalayan hill region. Kangchenjunga, which rises with an elevation of 8,586 metres (28,169 ft) is located further north of the area shown. Sandakphu, rising to a height of 3,665 metres (12,024 ft), on the Singalila Ridge, is the highest point in West Bengal. In Darjeeling Sadar subdivision 61% of the total population lives in the rural areas and 39% of the population lives in the urban areas. There are 78 tea gardens/ estates (the figure varies slightly according to different sources), producing and largely exporting Darjeeling tea in the district. It engages a large proportion of the population directly/ indirectly. Some tea gardens were identified in the 2011 census as census towns or villages. Such places are marked in the map as CT (census town) or R (rural/ urban centre). Specific tea estate pages are marked TE.

Note: The map alongside presents some of the notable locations in the subdivision. All places marked in the map are linked in the larger full screen map.

== Demographics ==
According to the 2011 Census of India, Chongtong Tea Garden had a total population of 5,802 of which 2,876 (50%) were males and 2,926 (50%) were females. There were 471 persons in the age range of 0 to 6 years. The total number of literate people in Chongtong Tea Garden was 4,098 (70.63% of the population over 6 years).

== Infrastructure ==
According to the District Census Handbook 2011, Darjiling, Chongtong Tea Garden covered an area of 6.8109 km^{2}. Among the civic amenities, it had 14 km roads with open drains, the protected water supply involved overhead tank, spring and tap water from untreated sources. It had 767 domestic electric connections. Among the educational facilities it had were 7 primary schools, 2 middle schools, 2 secondary schools and the nearest senior secondary school 6 km away. It had 5 non-formal education centres (Sarba Siksha Abhiyan). Among the social, cultural and recreational facilities, it had 2 auditorium/ community halls and 1 public library. An important commodity it manufactured was tea.

== Chongtong Tea Estate ==
Chongtong Tea Estate, managed by the Darjeeling Organic Tea Estates Private Limited, produces organic Darjeeling Tea. The estate is spread over an area of 960 acres (390 ha) and produces 1.75 lakh kg annually.

The name means arrow head in the Lepcha language means "arrow-head". Developed in 1882-83 by a British planter, the estate has changed hands several times till it was taken over by Sunil Kumar Bansal and Amit Bansal in 2007.

=== DOTEPL group ===
The gardens of the Darjeeling Organic Tea Estates Private Ltd. are: Ambootia, Chongtong, Happy Valley, Monteviot, Moondakotee, Mullootar, Nagri, Noorbong, Sepoydhurah (Chamling), Sivitar, Rangmook Ceder, Rangaroon, Pandam and Aloobari.

== Education ==
Chongtong High School is an English-medium coeducational institution established in 1966. It has facilities for teaching from class V to class XII. It has 5 computers, a library with 1,500 books and a playground.

Lower Chongtong High School is a Nepali-medium coeducational institution established in 1986. It has facilities for teaching from class V to class X. It has 4 computers and a playground.
