= Giddapahar =

- Village
- Location in West Bengal, India Giddapahar (India)
- Coordinates: 26.873478°N 88.292652°E
- Country: India
- State: West Bengal
- District: Darjeeling

Population (2011)
  - Total: 2,768
- Time zone: UTC+5:30 (IST)
- Lok Sabha constituency: Darjeeling
- Vidhan Sabha constituency: Kurseong
- Website: darjeeling.gov.in

Giddapahar (also written as Gidda Pahar) is a village in the Kurseong CD block in the Kurseong subdivision of the Darjeeling district in the state of West Bengal, India.

== Etymology ==
Literally, it means "Eagle’s hill" but is often thought of as "Eagle’s Cliff".

== History ==
Established in 1881, it has been with the Shaw family all through. Presently, a fourth generation owns and manages Giddapahar Tea Garden.

== Netaji Subhas Chandra Bose Museum ==
Netaji Subhas Chandra Bose Museum at Giddapahar is associated with the sacred memories of two great patriots – Sarat Chandra Bose and Subhas Chandra Bose. Sarat Bose purchased the house in 1922. Sarat Bose himself was interned in this house for two years in 1933–35. Subas Bose was placed under house arrest in this house for 7 months in 1936. It now houses a museum with many valuable photographs and articles.

== Geography ==
Places and tea estates in the north-eastern portion of Darjeeling Sadar subdivision (including Rangli Rangliot CD block) and Kurseong subdivision in Darjeeling district
CT: census town, R: rural/ urban centre, N: neighbourhood, H: hill centre, NP: national park/ wildlife sanctuary, TE: tea estate, TA: tourist attraction
Abbreviations used in names – TG for Tea Garden (town/village), TE for Tea Estate
Owing to space constraints in the small map, the actual locations in a larger map may vary slightly

=== Location ===
Gidda Pahar is located at 26.873478°N 88.292652°E.

Giddapahar is 4 km from Kurseong. Other tea gardens in the area are: Castleton Tea Estate, Sivitar Tea Estate and Jogmaya Tea Estate.

Giddapahar Tea Garden has a cultivated area of 94 hectares (230 acres) out of the total area of 115 hectares (280 acres) at an altitude ranging from 4,500 to 5,200 metres (14,800 to 17,100 ft) above mean sea level.

=== Area overview ===
The map alongside shows the eastern portion of the Darjeeling Himalayan hill region and a small portion of the terai region in its eastern and southern fringes, all of it in the Darjeeling district. In the Darjeeling Sadar subdivision 61.00% of the total population lives in the rural areas and 39.00% of the population lives in the urban areas. In the Kurseong subdivision 58.41% of the total population lives in the rural areas and 41.59% lives in the urban areas. There are 78 tea gardens/ estates (the figure varies slightly according to different sources), in the district, producing and largely exporting Darjeeling tea. It engages a large proportion of the population directly/ indirectly. Some tea gardens were identified in the 2011 census as census towns or villages. Such places are marked in the map as CT (census town) or R (rural/ urban centre). Specific tea estate pages are marked TE.

Note: The map alongside presents some of the notable locations in the subdivision. All places marked in the map are linked in the larger full screen map.

== Demographics ==
According to the 2011 Census of India, Gidda Pahar had a total population of 2,768 of which 1,385 (50%) were males and 1,383 (50%) were females. There were 221 persons in the age range of 0 to 6 years. The total number of literate people in Gidda Pahar was 2,307 (83.35% of the population over 6 years).

== Economy ==
Giddapahar Tea Garden produces 30,000 kg of exquisite Darjeeling tea from century old China bushes. The first flush tea produced here is famous. It also produces hand rolled white tea.

Giddapahar Tea Garden is certified as an ISO:9001 and ISO:21000 company.

Giddapahar Tea Garden sells tea through tea merchants. The two brothers Sudhansu and Himangsu presently own and run the tea garden.

== Education ==
St. Anthony's School at Giddapahar is an coeducational institution following the ICSE and ISC syllabus.
