= Rohini Tea Garden =

- Village
- Location in West Bengal, India Rohini Tea Garden (India)
- Coordinates: 26.843478°N 88.289652°E
- Country 26.843478,88.289652: India
- State: West Bengal
- District: Darjeeling

Population (2011)
  - Total: 2,752
- Time zone: UTC+5:30 (IST)
- PIN: 734203
- Telephone/STD code: 0353
- Lok Sabha constituency: Darjeeling
- Vidhan Sabha constituency: Kurseong
- Website: darjeeling.gov.in

Rohini Tea Garden is a village in the Kurseong CD block in the Kurseong subdivision of the Darjeeling district in the state of West Bengal, India.

== History ==
Rohini Tea Garden is one of the 8 new gardens in India, developed after independence. It was first planted in 1955 but was closed in 1962, till around the end of the century, when it was taken over by the Saria family and replanting started.

== Geography ==
Places and tea estates in the north-eastern portion of Darjeeling Sadar subdivision (including Rangli Rangliot CD block) and Kurseong subdivision in Darjeeling district
CT: census town, R: rural/ urban centre, N: neighbourhood, H: hill centre, NP: national park/ wildlife sanctuary, TE: tea estate, TA: tourist attraction
Abbreviations used in names – TG for Tea Garden (town/village), TE for Tea Estate
Owing to space constraints in the small map, the actual locations in a larger map may vary slightly

=== Location ===
Rohini Tea Garden is located at 26.843478°N 88.289652°E.

Of the 1,300 hectares originally planted with plants of Chinese variety, only 38 hectares have survived. 108 hectares planted from 1996 onwards have not yet attained maturity but still produce exquisite tea. Tukuriya, the highest division of the garden, has an average elevation of 4,400 ft (1,300 m). The estate has a new factory.

=== Area overview ===
The map alongside shows the eastern portion of the Darjeeling Himalayan hill region and a small portion of the terai region in its eastern and southern fringes, all of it in the Darjeeling district. In the Darjeeling Sadar subdivision 61.00% of the total population lives in the rural areas and 39.00% of the population lives in the urban areas. In the Kurseong subdivision 58.41% of the total population lives in the rural areas and 41.59% lives in the urban areas. There are 78 tea gardens/ estates (the figure varies slightly according to different sources), in the district, producing and largely exporting Darjeeling tea. It engages a large proportion of the population directly/ indirectly. Some tea gardens were identified in the 2011 census as census towns or villages. Such places are marked in the map as CT (census town) or R (rural/ urban centre). Specific tea estate pages are marked TE.

Note: The map alongside presents some of the notable locations in the subdivision. All places marked in the map are linked in the larger full screen map.

== Demographics ==
According to the 2011 Census of India, Rohini Tea Garden had a total population of 2,752 of which 1,401 (51%) were males and 1,351 (49%) were females. There were 298 persons in the age range of 0 to 6 years. The total number of literate people in Rohini Tea Garden was 1,857 (67.48% of the population over 6 years).

== Education ==
St. John's High School is an English-medium coeducational institution, with residential facilities, established in 1994. It has arrangements for teaching from class V to class X.

Carmel High School is an ICSE board coeducational institution.

Rohini Madhyamik Siksha Kendra is an English-medium coeducational institution was founded in 2008. It had facilities for teaching from class V to class VII. According to a 2010 newspaper report, around a hundred children from 15 surrounding villages studied in the school. However, the rickety condition of the school premises, particularly during rains and storms, forced children to walk 11 km or more to schools. Once, studies were disrupted after the tarpaulin sheets were blown away. Thereafter, the tea garden management provided tin (galvanised?) sheets for the roof.
