= Cart Road =

- Census Town
- Location in West Bengal, India Cart Road (India)
- Coordinates: 26.847597°N 88.339367°E
- Country: India
- State: West Bengal
- District: Darjeeling

Area
  - Total: 17.99 km^{2} (6.95 sq mi)

Population (2011)
  - Total: 14,444
  - Density: 802.9/km^{2} (2,079/sq mi)
- Time zone: UTC+5:30 (IST)
- Vehicle registration: WB

Cart Road is a census town in the Kurseong CD block in the Kurseong subdivision of the Darjeeling district in the state of West Bengal, India.

== Geography ==
Places and tea estates in the north-eastern portion of Darjeeling Sadar subdivision (including Rangli Rangliot CD block) and Kurseong subdivision in Darjeeling district
CT: census town, R: rural/ urban centre, N: neighbourhood, H: hill centre, NP: national park/ wildlife sanctuary, TE: tea estate, TA: tourist attraction
Abbreviations used in names – TG for Tea Garden (town/village), TE for Tea Estate
Owing to space constraints in the small map, the actual locations in a larger map may vary slightly

=== Location ===
Cart Road is located at 26.847597°N 88.339367°E.

=== Area overview ===
The map alongside shows the eastern portion of the Darjeeling Himalayan hill region and a small portion of the terai region in its eastern and southern fringes, all of it in the Darjeeling district. In the Darjeeling Sadar subdivision 61.00% of the total population lives in the rural areas and 39.00% of the population lives in the urban areas. In the Kurseong subdivision 58.41% of the total population lives in the rural areas and 41.59% lives in the urban areas. There are 78 tea gardens/ estates (the figure varies slightly according to different sources), in the district, producing and largely exporting Darjeeling tea. It engages a large proportion of the population directly/ indirectly. Some tea gardens were identified in the 2011 census as census towns or villages. Such places are marked in the map as CT (census town) or R (rural/ urban centre). Specific tea estate pages are marked TE.

Note: The map alongside presents some of the notable locations in the subdivision. All places marked in the map are linked in the larger full screen map.

== Demographics ==
According to the 2011 Census of India, Cart Road had a total population of 14,444 of which 7,116 (49%) were males and 7,328 (51%) were females. There were 1,085 persons in the age range of 0 to 6 years. The total number of literate people in Cart Road was 11,976 (82.91% of the population over 6 years).

As of 2001 India census, Cart Road had a population of 13,701. Males constitute 50% of the population and females 50%. Cart Road has an average literacy rate of 79%, higher than the national average of 59.5%; with male literacy of 85% and female literacy of 72%. 9% of the population is under 6 years of age.

== Infrastructure ==
According to the District Census Handbook 2011, Darjiling, Cart Road covered an area of 17.99 km^{2}. Among the civic amenities, it had domestic electric connections. Among the educational facilities it had were 12 primary schools, 4 middle schools, 2 senior secondary schools,1 degree college. Among the social, recreational and cultural facilities it had 1 orphanage home, 4 public libraries. An important commodity it manufactured was tea. It had the branches of 2 nationalised banks and 1 agricultural credit society.
