= Rohit Sharma (West Bengal politician) =

Indian politician

Rohit Sharma (born 1955) is an Indian politician from West Bengal. He is a two time member of the West Bengal Legislative Assembly from Kurseong Assembly constituency in Darjeeling district. He won the 2011 West Bengal Legislative Assembly election representing the Gorkha Janmukti Morcha and retained the seat in the 2016 election.

== Early life and education ==
Sharma is from Kurseong, Darjeeling district, West Bengal. He is the son of late Bal Prasad Sharma. He completed his PhD in economics on Trade Union Movement in the tea gardens of Darjeeling Hills at North Bengal University in 2005. Earlier, he did his MBA at Lucknow University in 1978 and BCom at a college affiliated with the University of North Bengal in 1975. He is a retired associate professor.

== Career ==
Sharma first became an MLA from Kurseong Assembly constituency representing the Gorkha Janmukti Morcha winning the 2011 West Bengal Legislative Assembly election. He polled 114,297 votes and defeated his nearest rival and sitting MLA, Shanta Chhetri of the All India Trinamool Congress, by a margin of 93,096 votes. He retained the seat for the Gorkha Janmukti Morcha winning the 2016 West Bengal Legislative Assembly election. He polled 86,947 votes and defeated his nearest rival Shanta Chhetri once again, by a margin of 33,726 votes. But in 2016 Chhetri contested on Trinamool Congress ticket.
