= West Bengal Official Language Act, 1961 =

Act in West Bengal

The West Bengal Official Language Act, 1961 was an act of the legislature of the State of West Bengal, Republic of India, which accorded official status to the Bengali language for all state business, including legislation, except in the three hill subdivisions of Darjeeling, Kalimpong, and Kurseong of the existing Darjeeling district in which the Nepali language was also recognised. It was passed during the chief ministership of B. C. Roy. (Note: "The West Bengal government headed by B. C. Roy made Nepali as the second language in the state as per the West Bengal Official Language Act in the wake of the AIGL movement in 1961.") The demands for Nepali had mainly come from the Nepali-speaking Gorkha majority communities of the Himalayan subdivisions of Darjeeling, Kalimpong and Kurseong. In 1992, Nepali was recognised as one of languages with official status in India by being included in the Eighth Schedule to the Constitution of India. (Note: "Finally the Nepali language was included in the 8th Schedule of the Constitution in 1992 thanks to the agitation by another Nepalese Indian leader and former Sikkim chief minister, Nar Bahadur Bhandari.")

== Statement of the Act ==
West Bengal Act XXIV of 1961

THE WEST BENGAL OFFICIAL LANGUAGE ACT, 1961.

[11 November 1961]

An Act to provide for the adoption of the Bengali language as the language to be used for the official purposes of the State of West Bengal including purposes of legislation.

It is hereby enacted in the Twelfth Year of the Republic of India, by the Legislature of West Bengal, as follows: —

1. (1) This Act may be called the West Bengal Official Language Act, 1961.

(2) It extends to the whole of West Bengal.

2. With effect from such date, not later than four years from the date of commencement of this Act, as the State Government may, by notification in the Official Gazette, appoint in this behalf—

(a) in the three hill subdivisions of the district of Darjeeling, namely, Darjeeling, Kalimpong and Kurseong, the Bengali language and the Nepali language, and

(b) elsewhere, the Bengali language,

shall be the language or languages to be used for the official purposes of the State of West Bengal referred to in article 345 of the Constitution of India.

== Sources ==
- Bagchi, Romit (2012), "Evolution of Political Views, Footnote 24", Gorkhaland: Crisis of Statehood, Thousand Oaks, CA and New Delhi: SAGE publications, ISBN 978-81-321-0726-2
- Chatterjee, Shibashis (2020), "The Left Front and the Politics of Regionalism in West Bengal", in Chatterji, Rakhahari; Basu, Partha Pratim (eds.), West Bengal Under the Left 1977–2011, London and New York: Routledge, pp. 66–90, ISBN 978-0-367-34850-2
- Dasgupta, Atis (1999). "Ethnic Problems and Movements for Autonomy in Darjeeling". Social Scientist. 27 (11–12). Social Scientist: 47–68. doi:10.2307/3518047. JSTOR 3518047.
- Sen, Jahar (1989), "Appendix 5: The West Bengal Official Language Act, 1961", Darjeeling: A Favoured Retreat, New Delhi: Indus Publishing Company, p. 107–108, ISBN 81-85182-15-9
