= Sonam Lama (West Bengal politician) =

Indian politician

Member of the West Bengal Legislative Assembly
- Incumbent
- Assumed office 4 May 2026
- Preceded by: Bishnu Prasad Sharma
- Constituency: Kurseong

Personal details
- Party: Bharatiya Janata Party
- Profession: Politician

Sonam Lama is an Indian politician from West Bengal and a member of the Bharatiya Janata Party. He was elected as a Member of the West Bengal Legislative Assembly from the Kurseong constituency in the 2026 West Bengal Legislative Assembly election.

== See also ==
- Kurseong Assembly constituency
