= Yangdup Lama =

- Born: Yangdup Lama; 01.01.1972; Gayabari, Darjeeling, India
- Occupations: Entrepreneur, Author, Bartender, Mentor
- Years active: 1995 - Present
- Known for: Cocktails & Dreams Speakeasy, Sidecar, The Brook, Bar Stormy; Drinks International Magazine: 100 Most Influential People in the Beverage Industry 2020, 2021, 2023; Industry Icon Asia's 50 Best Bars 2024; Keeper of the Quaich, Blair Castle, Scotland 2023; Industry Legend, 30 Best Bars, India 2021; American Whiskey Ambassador India 2017 by the Distilled Spirits Council of the United States (DISCUS); Old Monk, Indian Bartender of the Year, 1996; Asia Pacific 30 Under 30 Awards, 1997
- Notable work: Cocktails & Dreams: The Ultimate Indian Cocktail Book

Yangdup Lama is one of India’s most respected bar professionals, entrepreneurs, authors, and mentors, with nearly three decades of influence on the country’s cocktail culture. His career spans bartending, training, brand ambassadorship, and education, with a strong focus on nurturing the next generation of bartenders.

His accolades include Indian Bartender of the Year (1996), Asia Pacific 30 Under 30 (1997), multiple appearances on Drinks International’s Bar World 100, Industry Legend 30 Best Bars, India (2022), Keeper of the Quaich, Scotland (2023), and the Industry Icon Award at Asia’s 50 Best Bars (2024).

Yangdup is the co-founder of Sidecar, established in 2018, which has earned international recognition through Asia’s 50 Best Bars and The World’s 50 Best Bars. He has also founded acclaimed venues including Cocktails & Dreams Speakeasy, The Brook, and Bar Stormy further expanding his vision.

He is also the Co-founder of India Bartender Show, a platform that brings together India’s bar community through education, consumer experiences, and brand advocacy, fostering collaboration and growth across the industry.

Beyond his bars, Yangdup is passionate about mentorship and education, conducting training, seminars, and workshops that promote creativity, knowledge, and hospitality. His philosophy is simple: bartending is not just about making drinks, it is about creating meaningful connections and memorable experiences.

Based in Delhi-NCR, Yangdup’s life extends well beyond the world of bars and beverages. He shares his journey with his wife, Neha Kunjummen Lama, and their two children, Pema Youden Lama and Norbu Tshering Lama. Family remains an important part of his life, grounding a career that has taken him from the bar counter to international recognition, while keeping him closely connected to the people, places, and values that have shaped his journey.

Today, Yangdup continues to work across hospitality, education, mentorship, and beverage development, bringing together his experience, curiosity, and belief in the power of Indian ingredients, people, and stories to create experiences that can resonate with the world.

== Early life ==
Yangdup Lama is the second child of mother Kamala Lama (Sherpa) and father Late Namgal Lama (Yonzon), and the grandchild of Late Karma Dorjee Lama and Late Chomai Dolma Lama. Born in the village of Gayabari near Kurseong, in the hill district of Darjeeling in North Eastern India, Lama comes from a family with a longstanding connection to the Buddhist cultural and spiritual traditions of the Himalayan region. He is a descendant of the family of Nakpa Monks, a lineage rooted in the traditional Buddhist heritage of the Himalayan communities and one that forms an important part of his ancestral and cultural background.

Lama completed his Secondary School Certificate (Class 10) from Victoria Boys’ School, Kurseong, and his Senior School Certificate (Class 12) from Army Public School, Bengdubi.

In 1992, Lama moved to Kolkata to study Hotel Management at IAM Kolkata. After completing his studies, he moved to Delhi in 1995.

== Career ==
Yangdup Lama often describes himself as an “accidental bartender.” His career in hospitality began in 1995 at the Hyatt Regency Delhi, where he joined as a Food & Beverage Server. During the first few months of his hotel career, he found himself drawn to the bar and discovered bartending at the Polo Lounge. What began almost by accident soon became a passion. Working at one of Delhi’s prominent hotel bars introduced him to the craft of bartending, the art of hospitality, and the energy of creating experiences for guests. Those early years, from 1995 to 1999, gave him the foundation and discipline of a five-star hotelier while setting him on a path he could never have anticipated

In 2000, Yangdup took the step of becoming an independent bartender and began running a mobile bartending service, a journey he has continued for more than two decades. What started as a freelance bartending venture gradually developed into Cocktails & Dreams and, later, Thirsty Three Hospitality, a platform through which he worked as a bartender, beverage consultant, trainer, and mentor. His work has involved creating beverage programs, consulting with hospitality businesses, training bartenders and teams, and sharing practical knowledge and experience with professionals entering and developing within the industry.

As his experience and understanding of the beverage industry grew, he began to move from working behind the bar to creating bars of his own. Since 2014, he along with is business partner Minakshi Singh have pursued the vision of building cocktail bars that combine quality drinks with genuine hospitality, strong service culture, and a sense of community. This journey has included Cocktails & Dreams Speakeasy, The Brook in Gurugram, Sidecar in Greater Kailash, New Delhi and Bar Stormy in Hyderabad. Sidecar went on to establish a significant presence on Asia’s and World’s cocktail landscape.

Yangdup has always remained deeply connected to his Himalayan roots. His connection to the region is an important part of his identity and has shaped his curiosity about its people, cultures, ingredients, traditions, and stories. Over the years, he has championed Himalayan ingredients in cocktails, travelling across the Himalayas to discover lesser known ingredients and the communities and traditions surrounding them. Through his work, he brings these ingredients into contemporary beverage culture while keeping their folklore, memories, and cultural significance at the heart of the experience.

His career in the hospitality and beverage industry spans over three decades, during which he has worked as a hotelier, bartender, bar owner, author, educator, and consultant. Beginning his career at the Polo Lounge in 1995, he has established several establishments in India, including Cocktails & Dreams, Speakeasy, Sidecar, The Brook in Gurugram and Bar Stormy in Hyderabad.

== Awards and accolades ==
- Industry Icon, Asia's 50 Best Bars 2024
- Keeper of the Quaich, Blair Castle, Scotland 2023
- Mixologist of the Year 2022, Travel + Leisure
- Industry Legend, 30 Best Bars India 2021
- Bar Worlds 100 Most influential Figures, Drinks International Magazine 2020, 2021, 2023
- Indian Bartender of the Year 1996
- The Asia-Pacific 30 under 30 Award 1997.
- American Whiskey Ambassador India 2017 by Distilled Spirits Council of United States.(DISCUS)

== Books ==
Cocktails & Dreams: The Ultimate Indian Cocktail Book
