= Tindharia =

Tindharia Tindharay
- Village
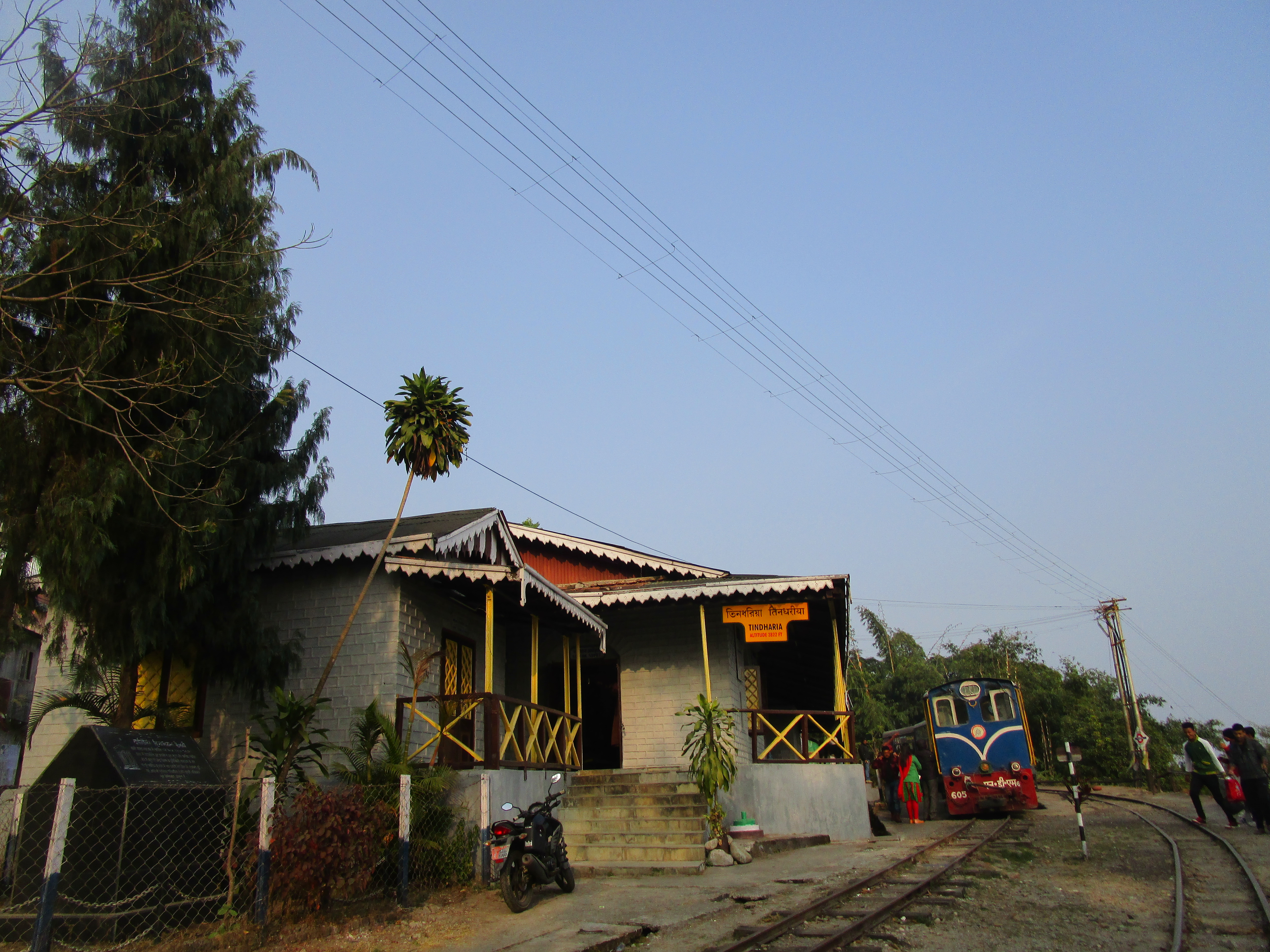
- Tindharia Railway Station

- Location in West Bengal, India
- Coordinates: 26.853°N 88.333°E
- Country: India
- State: West Bengal
- District: Darjeeling
- Elevation: 860 m (2,820 ft)

Population (2011)
  - Total: 1,015
- Time zone: UTC+5:30 (IST)
- PIN: 734223
- Telephone code: 91 354
- Nearest city: Siliguri
- Lok Sabha constituency: Darjeeling
- Vidhan Sabha constituency: Kurseong
- Website: darjeeling.gov.in

Tindharia or Tindharay (English meaning: 'Three streams') is a village in the Kurseong CD block in the Kurseong subdivision of the Darjeeling district in the state of West Bengal, India.

== History ==
It was developed for the purpose of a railway workshop for the Darjeeling Himalayan Railway or "toy train".

"The construction work including rail track of Darjeeling Himalayan Railways started in May 1879 and completed from Siliguri to Tindharia in 1880. The Governor General of India, Mr. Lord Litton inaugurated the train running in March 1880".

The workshop was built at the present location in 1881. It was built temporarily during the last part of the 19th century for the maintenance of locomotives and carriages and wagons of Darjeeling Himalayan Railway. Construction of the Tindharia workshop at the present location started in 1913 and started operation in 1925. The total area of the workshop is 6670 sqm, of which 3810 sqm. is covered.

The Shanta Bhawan Christian mission, located between Tindharia and Smriti Van and established in 1957, is an institution where children from poor families and without parents are looked after.

== Geography ==
Places and tea estates in the north-eastern portion of Darjeeling Sadar subdivision (including Rangli Rangliot CD block) and Kurseong subdivision in Darjeeling district
CT: census town, R: rural/ urban centre, N: neighbourhood, H: hill centre, NP: national park/ wildlife sanctuary, TE: tea estate, TA: tourist attraction
Abbreviations used in names – TG for Tea Garden (town/village), TE for Tea Estate
Owing to space constraints in the small map, the actual locations in a larger map may vary slightly

=== Location ===
Tindharia is located at 26.853°N 88.333°E.

Tindharia is a railway settlement town along the Darjeeling Himalayan Railway (DHR) route, a UNESCO World Heritage Site. It falls under the Darjeeling district of West Bengal, India lying between Siliguri and Kurseong on the Hill Cart Road (National Highway 55).

=== Area overview ===
The map alongside shows the eastern portion of the Darjeeling Himalayan hill region and a small portion of the terai region in its eastern and southern fringes, all of it in the Darjeeling district. In the Darjeeling Sadar subdivision 61.00% of the total population lives in the rural areas and 39.00% of the population lives in the urban areas. In the Kurseong subdivision 58.41% of the total population lives in the rural areas and 41.59% lives in the urban areas. There are 78 tea gardens/ estates (the figure varies slightly according to different sources), in the district, producing and largely exporting Darjeeling tea. It engages a large proportion of the population directly/ indirectly. Some tea gardens were identified in the 2011 census as census towns or villages. Such places are marked in the map as CT (census town) or R (rural/ urban centre). Specific tea estate pages are marked TE.

Note: The map alongside presents some of the notable locations in the subdivision. All places marked in the map are linked in the larger full screen map.

== Demographics ==
According to the 2011 Census of India, Tidharia had a total population of 1,015 of which 507 (50%) were males and 508 (50%) were females. There were 89 persons in the age range of 0 to 6 years. The total number of literate people in Tindharia was 717 (70.64% of the population over 6 years).

== Languages spoken ==
Nepali, Hindi, Bengali.

== Nearest major transport service ==
Service	Name	Location	Distance
Railway Station	Siliguri Junction	Siliguri	22 km
Railway Station	New Jalpaiguri Junction (NJP)	New Jalpaiguri	27 km
Airport	Bagdogra Airport	Bagdogra	37 km
Bus Terminal	Tenzing Norgay Bus Terminas	Siliguri	22 km

== Tea ==
The Tindharia tea estate is a bio-organic estate and produces organic Darjeeling Black & Green Orthodox Tea.

== Education ==
Tindharia Higher Secondary School is an English-medium boys only institution established in 1947. It has facilities for teaching from class V to class XII. It has 4 computers, a library with 956 books and a playground.

Tindharia Girls Higher Secondary School is an English-medium girls only institution established in 1950. It has facilities for teaching from class V to class XII. It has 4 computers.

== See also ==
Tindharia Workshop
