= Bishnu Prasad Sharma =

Indian politician

Member of the West Bengal Legislative Assembly
- In office 2 May 2021 – 5 May 2026
- Preceded by: Rohit Sharma
- Succeeded by: Sonam Lama
- Constituency: Kurseong

Personal details
- Party: Indian National Congress (2026–present)
- Other political affiliations: Bharatiya Janata Party (2021–2026)
- Education: 10th Pass
- Profession: Politician

Bishnu Prasad Sharma is an Indian politician from Trinamool Congress. In May 2021, he was elected as a member of the West Bengal Legislative Assembly from Kurseong, being a member of Bharatiya Janata Party. He defeated Tshering Lama Dahal of Gorkha Janmukti Morcha (Tamang) by 15,515 votes in 2021 West Bengal Assembly election.
