= Ambootia =

Ambootia Ambotay
- Tea estate village
- Location within West Bengal Location within India
- Coordinates: 26.8766°N 88.2407°E
- Country: India
- State: West Bengal
- District: Darjeeling
- Lok Sabha constituency: Darjeeling
- Vidhan Sabha constituency: Kurseong
- Administrative Body: Gorkhaland Territorial Administration
- PIN: 734203
- Telephone/STD code: 0354
- Website: darjeeling.gov.in

Ambootia or Ambootay is a tea estate village in the Kurseong CD block in the Kurseong subdivision of the Darjeeling district in the state of West Bengal in India.

== Geography ==
Places and tea estates in the north-eastern portion of Darjeeling Sadar subdivision (including Rangli Rangliot CD block) and Kurseong subdivision in Darjeeling district
CT: census town, R: rural/ urban centre, N: neighbourhood, H: hill centre, NP: national park/ wildlife sanctuary, TE: tea estate, TA: tourist attraction
Abbreviations used in names – TG for Tea Garden (town/village), TE for Tea Estate
Owing to space constraints in the small map, the actual locations in a larger map may vary slightly

=== Location ===
Geo-location 26.8766°N 88.2407°E.

Ambootia is situated below Kurseong in the foothills of the Himalayan Mountains. Nepali is the main language spoken by the local population.

=== Area overview ===
The map alongside shows the eastern portion of the Darjeeling Himalayan hill region and a small portion of the terai region in its eastern and southern fringes, all of it in the Darjeeling district. In the Darjeeling Sadar subdivision 61.00% of the total population lives in the rural areas and 39.00% of the population lives in the urban areas. In the Kurseong subdivision 58.41% of the total population lives in the rural areas and 41.59% lives in the urban areas. There are 78 tea gardens/ estates (the figure varies slightly according to different sources), in the district, producing and largely exporting Darjeeling tea. It engages a large proportion of the population directly/ indirectly. Some tea gardens were identified in the 2011 census as census towns or villages. Such places are marked in the map as CT (census town) or R (rural/ urban centre). Specific tea estate pages are marked TE.

Note: The map alongside presents some of the notable locations in the subdivision. All places marked in the map are linked in the larger full screen map.

=== Ambootia landslide ===
In October 1968, a large landslide in the Darjeeling Himalayan hill region was triggered by high volumes of rainfall. The Ambootia landslide, as it was called, remained active until re-vegetation began to stabilise it in the late 1980s and early 1990s.

== Demographics ==
According to the 2011 Census of India, Ambootia had a total population of 4,811 of which 2,344 (49%) were males and 2,467 (51%) were females. There were 370 persons in the age range of 0 to 6 years. The total number of literate people in Ambootia was 3,512 (73.00% of the population over 6 years).

== Tea ==
Ambootia, is one of the most well known tea estates in Darjeeling. It was amongst the first tea estates established by the British tea planters in the 1850s and is the second largest Darjeeling Tea producer in India. The Darjeeling Tea Company of England established Ambootia Tea Garden in 1861 and was taken over by Indian entrepreneurs in 1954 after India attained independence in 1947. When the Bansal Tea Group took over the garden in 1987, it had already been declared a sick unit.

"It has developed into a well-integrated, self sustaining, ecologically balanced and economically viable tea garden in the recent years."

Ambootia Group had 15 tea estates within its portfolio of which 12 estates are in Darjeeling and two each in Assam and Dooars. "Over the years, Ambootia – or the Darjeeling Organic Tea Estates Private Ltd – had acquired 12 of the 87 Darjeeling plantations and was internationally renowned for its high-quality teas".

In late 2022, due to a long going financial distress at Darjeeling Organic Tea Estates Pvt. Ltd., Ambootia along with 5 other gardens were handed over to Mr. Sushil Kumar Agarwal of Lemongrass Organic Tea Estates Pvt. Ltd. (LOTEPL), a Joint Venture between MLA Group and KK Group. With this acquisition, the Sushil Kumar Agarwal led LOTEPL manages 9 Tea Estates in Darjeeling region. LOTEPL is now becoming one of the most sought after company globally for Darjeeling Tea.

Ambootia Tea Garden has a total area of 790.64 ha (1,953.7 acres), tea is cultivated in 350.48 ha (866.1 acres). The garden has a fully operational and well maintained tea factory. In 1992, it transitioned to 100% certified organic and bio-dynamic production and in 1994, Ambootia was Fair Trade certified.

It employs around 800 workers (both permanent and casual) and 84 staff. "Wheat, rice and kerosene are provided to the labourers at subsidised rates. Coal or firewood, slippers and umbrella are given to the workers annually." The garden provides quarters to workers and staff. There are 4 creches for looking after the children of female employees. Four primary schools are run by the Gorkha Hill council and 3 by the West Bengal government. There is a garden hospital with 8 beds and a visiting doctor. Workers and their families are entitled to free treatment at the garden hospital.

=== LOTEPL group ===
The gardens of the Lemongrass Organic Tea Estates Private Ltd. are: Ambootia, Chongtong, Happy Valley, Monteviot, Moondakotee, Mullootar, Nagri (Mangarjung), Sepoydhoorah (Chamling) and Sivitar.

== Transport ==
Service	Name	Location	Distance
Railway Station	Siliguri Junction	Siliguri	37 km
Railway Station	New Jalpaiguri Junction (NJP)	New Jalpaiguri	42 km
Airport	Bagdogra Airport	Bagdogra	42 km
Bus Terminal	Tenzing Norgay Bus Terminas	Siliguri	37 km

== Notable persons ==
- Hira Devi Waiba
- Navneet Aditya Waiba
