= Gayabari railway station =

Railway station in West Bengal, India

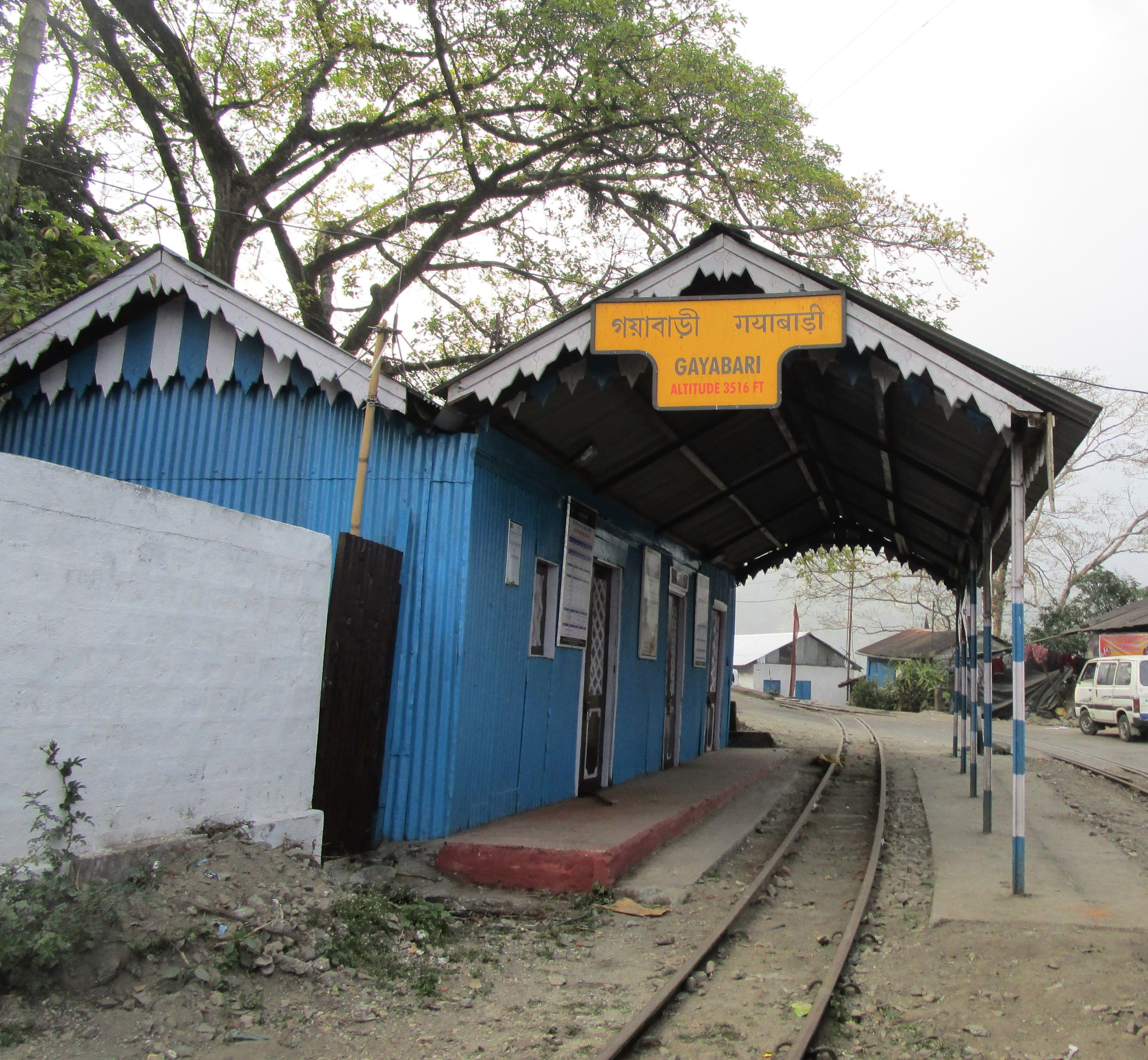

General information
- Coordinates: 26.8498276°N 88.2913874°E
- Line: Katihar railway division

Other information
- Station code: DHR
Location
- Location within India Location within West Bengal

Gayabari railway station serves the village of Gayabari in West Bengal, India. It is part of the Darjeeling Himalayan Railway It has a platform which was built between 1879 and 1881. The Darjeeling Himalayan Railway is a UNESCO World Heritage Site.

The station lies in the Katihar railway division
