= Phuguri Tea Estate =

Tea garden in West Bengal, India

- Interactive map of Phuguri Tea Estate
- Location: Darjeeling district, West Bengal, India
- Coordinates: 26.8464°N 88.2026°E
- Area: 1,069.64 acres (432.87 ha)
- Elevation: 3,500 to 6,000 feet (1,100 to 1,800 m)
- Owner: Bagaria Group
- Open: 1880

Phuguri Tea Estate is a tea garden in the Mirik CD block in the Mirik subdivision of the Darjeeling district in the Indian state of West Bengal.

== History ==
Dr. Campbell was posted as a civil surgeon at Darjeeling in 1839. At that time there were hardly 20 families living in the entire hill tracts. In 1841, Dr. Campbell brought China tea seeds from Kumaon Hills and planted them in his garden. The success of the initial efforts led the government to go for commercial development of tea gardens. Tea estates, with seeds from government nurseries, were developed at Tukvar, Steinthal and Aloobari. These were followed by other gardens.

Dr. Campbell's primary problem was to draw settlers to that uninhabited region. He sought the help of a nobleman from Nepal, Dakman Rai, to bring workers and immigrants from Nepal. Dakman Rai went back to Nepal and brought back one thousand immigrants, all of whom belonged to the Gurkha or Nepalese community. In appreciation of his helpful service, Dakman Rai was given the grant of free-hold lands presently known as Soureni Tea Estate, Samripani and Phuguri Tea Estate. The last named tea estate was set up in 1880.

Phuguri Tea Estate is presently owned by the Bagaria Group.

== Geography ==
Places and tea estates in the southern portion of Darjeeling Sadar subdivision (including Jorebunglow Sukhiapokhri CD block), and Mirik Subdivision in Darjeeling district
CT: census town, R: rural/ urban centre, NP: national park/ wildlife sanctuary, TE: tea estate
Abbreviations used in names – TG for Tea Garden (town/village), TE for Tea Estate
Owing to space constraints in the small map, the actual locations in a larger map may vary slightly

Phuguri Tea Estate is 7 km from Mirik.

Phuguri Tea Estate produces one of the finest clonal teas that has gained fame all over the world. The tea plantations cover 1,069.64 acres (432.87 ha) spread over from an altitude of 3,500 to 6,000 feet (1,100 to 1,800 m) above mean sea level.

Note: The map alongside presents some of the notable locations in the subdivision. All places marked in the map are linked in the larger full screen map.

== Economy ==
Phuguri Tea Estate produces 150,000 kg organic Darjeeling tea annually. It is certified as bio-organic and rain forest alliance, UTZ, ETP, COR, JAS, Hazard Analysis & Critical Control Point (HACCP), and Fair Trade certified.

Phuguri Tea Estate produces very fine clonal teas. Clonal tea bushes are grown from hybrid clones, rather than seeds. This enables control over the quality of tea produced.

The Bagaria Group is headed by Sheo Shankar Bagaria, assisted by Abhishek Bagaria and Asish Bagaria. In the Darjeeling hills, it also has tea gardens at Gayabaree & Millikthong and Orange Valley. One of the group companies Kusum International is tea trading and export set-up. It exports tea to Japan, Singapore, Sri Lanka, Dubai, European countries, USA and Canada.
