= Orange Valley Tea Garden =

Orange Valley Tea Garden Bloomfield Tea Garden
- Village
- Location in West Bengal, India Orange Valley Tea Garden (India)
- Coordinates: 27.03162°N 88.23851°E
- Country: India
- State: West Bengal
- District: Darjeeling

Population (2011)
  - Total: 2,901
- Time zone: UTC+5:30 (IST)
- Lok Sabha constituency: Darjeeling
- Vidhan Sabha constituency: Darjeeling
- Website: darjeeling.gov.in

Orange Valley Tea Garden is a village in the Darjeeling Pulbazar CD block in the Darjeeling Sadar subdivision of the Darjeeling district in the state of West Bengal, India.

== History ==
What was earlier known as Bloomfield Tea Garden was renamed Orange Valley Tea Garden, when the ownership was transferred from Bloomfield Tea Company to Orange Valley Tea Limited. It is now owned by the Bagaria Group.

== Geography ==
Places and tea estates in the north-western portion of Darjeeling Sadar subdivision (including Darjeeling Pulbazar CD block) in Darjeeling district
CT: census town, R: rural/ urban centre, N: neighbourhood, H: hill centre, NP: national park/ wildlife sanctuary, TE: tea estate, TA: tourist attraction
Abbreviations used in names – TG for Tea Garden (town/village), TE for Tea Estate
Owing to space constraints in the small map, the actual locations in a larger map may vary slightly

=== Location ===
Orange Valley Tea Garden is located at 27.03162°N 88.23851°E.

=== Area overview ===
The map alongside shows the northern portion of the Darjeeling Himalayan hill region. Kangchenjunga, which rises with an elevation of 8,586 metres (28,169 ft) is located further north of the area shown.Sandakphu, rising to a height of 3,665 metres (12,024 ft), on the Singalila Ridge, is the highest point in West Bengal. In Darjeeling Sadar subdivision 61% of the total population lives in the rural areas and 39% of the population lives in the urban areas. There are 78 tea gardens/ estates (the figure varies slightly according to different sources), producing and largely exporting Darjeeling tea in the district. It engages a large proportion of the population directly/ indirectly. Some tea gardens were identified in the 2011 census as census towns or villages. Such places are marked in the map as CT (census town) or R (rural/ urban centre). Specific tea estate pages are marked TE.

Note: The map alongside presents some of the notable locations in the subdivision. All places marked in the map are linked in the larger full screen map.

== Demographics ==
According to the 2011 Census of India, Bloomfield Tea Garden had a total population of 2,901 of which 1,434 (49%) were males and 1,467 (51%) were females. There were 219 persons in the age range of 0 to 6 years. The total number of literate people in Bloomfield Tea Garden was 2,229 (76.84% of the population over 6 years).

== Orange Valley Tea Garden ==
Orange Valley Tea Garden is a bio-organic garden producing mainly black tea. It is spread over an area of 347.26 hectares (858.1 acres) at an altitude ranging from 3,500 to 6,000 feet (1,100 to 1,800 m) above mean sea level. It produces 110,000 kg tea annually from the old Chinary bushes planted by the British. These are replaced at the rate of 2% per year.

Orange Valley Tea Garden is a Hazard Analysis & Critical Control Point (HACCP) and certified as Bio-organic & Rain Forest Alliance, UTZ, ETP, COR, JAS. It has secured Fair Trade Certification.

The Bagaria Group is headed by Sheo Shankar Bagaria, assisted by Abhishek Bagaria and Asish Bagaria. In the Darjeeling hills, it also has tea gardens at Phuguri and Gayabaree & Millikthong, both in the Mirik area. One of the group companies Kusum International is tea trading and export set-up. It exports tea to Japan, Singapore, Sri Lanka, Dubai, European countries, USA and Canada.
