= Shanta Chhetri =

Indian politician

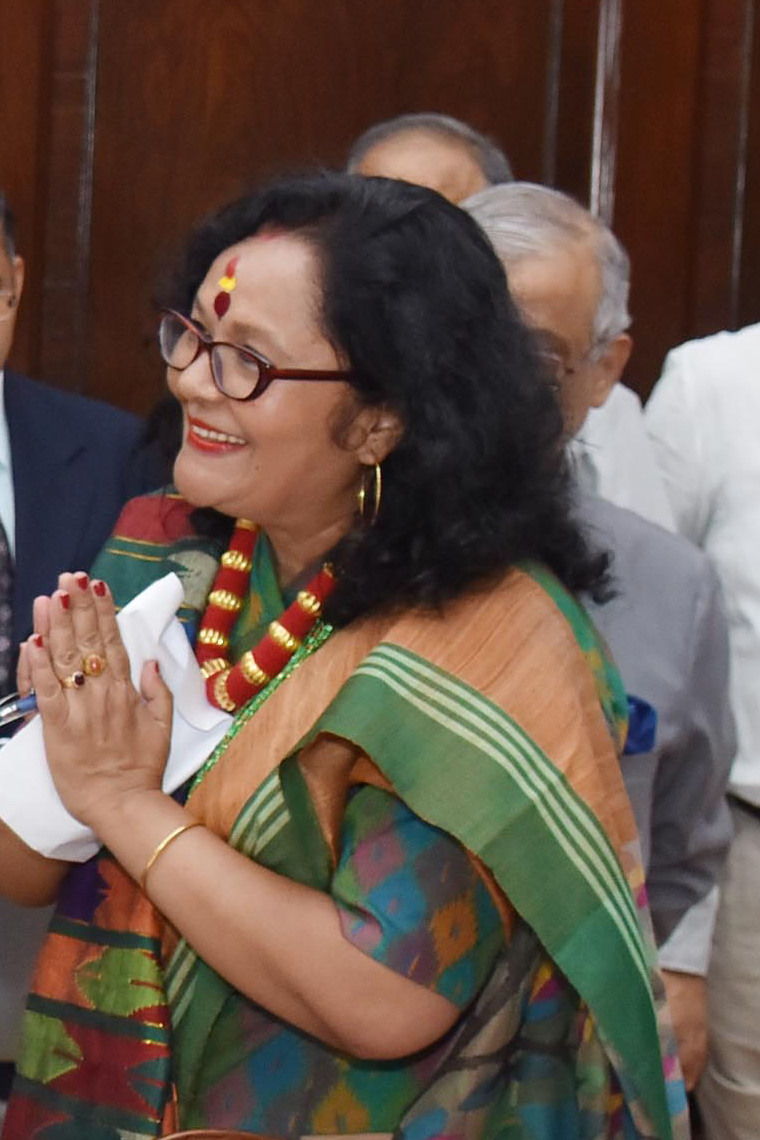
- Chhetri in 2017

Member of Parliament, Rajya Sabha
- In office 19 August 2017 – 18 August 2023
- Preceded by: Sitaram Yechury
- Succeeded by: Prakash Chik Baraik
- Constituency: West Bengal

Personal details
- Born: 10 October 1956 (age 69) Kurseong, West Bengal
- Party: Trinamool Congress (2014–present)
- Spouse: Deo Chandra Karki
- Education: M.Com in 1980 (University of North Bengal)

Shanta Chhetri is an Indian politician who is a leader of the Trinamool Congress. She was elected unopposed to the Rajya Sabha on 31 July 2017. She is member of the TMC Steering Committee.
