= Kurseong (community development block) =

- Community development block
- Coordinates: 26.88°N 88.28°E
- Country: India
- State: West Bengal
- District: Darjeeling

Area
  - Total: 372.30 km^{2} (143.75 sq mi)

Population (2011)
  - Total: 94,347
  - Density: 253.42/km^{2} (656.35/sq mi)
- Time zone: UTC+5:30 (IST)
- Lok Sabha constituency: Darjeeling
- Vidhan Sabha constituency: Kurseong
- Website: darjeeling.gov.in

Kurseong is a community development block (CD block) that forms an administrative division in the Kurseong subdivision of the Darjeeling district in the Indian state of West Bengal.

== Geography ==
Kurseong is located at 26°53′N 88°17′E.

Kurseong CD block is partly in the Kurseong Range physiographic region, south of the Darjeeling Himalayas physiographic region, and partly in the Western Dooars physiographic region, a plain area spread over foothills of the Himalayas. The elevation in the Kurseong Range varies from 300 to 1,800 m and there are many low hill peaks. Western Dooars is a plain area with elevation ranging from 80 to 300 m.

Kurseong CD block is bounded by the Rangli Rangliot CD block on the north, Kalimpong I CD block and Rajganj CD block in Jalpaiguri district on the east, Matigara and Naxalbari CD blocks on the south and Mirik CD block on the west.

The Kurseong CD block has an area of 372.30 km^{2}. It has 1 panchayat samity, 14 gram panchayats, 123 gram sansads (village councils), 71 mouzas, 65 inhabited villages and 1 census town. Kurseong police station serves this block. Headquarters of this CD block is at Kurseong.

Gram panchayats in Kurseong CD block are: Chimney-Deorali, Gayabari I, Gayabari II, Gayabari III, Mahanadi, Pandu, Seetong I, Seetong II, Seetong III, Shivakhola, St. Marry’s I, St. Marry’s II, St. Marry’s III and Sukna.

== Demographics ==
=== Population ===
According to the 2011 Census of India, the Kurseong CD block had a total population of 94,347, of which 79,903 were rural and 14,444 were urban. There were 47,030 (50%) males and 47,317 (50%) females. There were 8,528 persons in the age range of 0 to 6 years. The Scheduled Castes numbered 8,271 (8.77%) and the Scheduled Tribes numbered 29,232 (30.98%).

Census town in the Kurseong CD block are (2011 census figures in brackets): Cart Road (14,444).

Large villages (with 4,000+ population) in the Kurseong CD block are (2011 census figures in brackets): Ambootia Tea Garden (4,811), Longview Tea Garden (5,301) and Simulbari Tea Garden (4,160).

Other villages in the Kurseong CD block include (2011 census figures in brackets): Gayabari (407), Mahanadi (1,420), Sittong Khas Mahal (3,098), Shibkhola (146), St. Mary’s (1,565), Sukna (1,011), Mangpu Cinchona Plantation (1,109), Tindharia (1,015), Singel Tea Garden (2,590), Garidhora (M.Bari) Tea Garden (2,877), Makaibari Tea Garden (1,289), Rohini Tea Garden (2,752), Giddapahar (2,768) and Monteviot Tea Garden (743).

=== Literacy ===
According to the 2011 census the total number of literate persons in the Kurseong CD block was 69,646 (81.15% of the population over 6 years) out of which males numbered 37,895 (88.56% of the male population over 6 years) and females numbered 31,751 (73.78% of the female population over 6 years). The gender disparity (the difference between female and male literacy rates) was 14.78%.

See also – List of West Bengal districts ranked by literacy rate

Literacy in CD blocks of
Darjeeling district (2011)
Darjeeling Sadar subdivision
Darjeeling Pulbazar – 80.78%
Rangli Rangliot – 80.50%
Jorebunglow Sukhiapokhri – 82.54%
Kalimpong subdivision
Kalimpong I – 81.43%
Kalimpong II – 79.68%
Gorubathan – 76.88%
Kurseong subdivision
Kurseong – 81.15%
Mirik subdivision
Mirik – 80.84%
Siliguri subdivision
Matigara – 74.78%
Naxalbari – 75.47%
Phansidewa – 64.46%
Kharibari – 67.37%
2011 Census: CD Block Wise

Primary Census Abstract Data

=== Language and religion ===
Religion in Kurseong CD block (2011)
Hinduism	65.83%
Buddhism	23.76%
Christian	7.54%
Kirat Mundhum	1.85%
Islam	0.65%
Other or not stated	0.37%

In the 2011 census, Hindus numbered 62,111 and formed 65.83% of the population in the Kurseong CD block. Buddhists numbered 22,420 and formed 23.76% of the population. Christians numbered 7,110 and formed 7.54% of the population. Muslims numbered 610 and formed 0.65% of the population. Others numbered 2,096 and formed 2.22% of the population.

Languages of Kurseong CD block (2011)
1. Nepali (89.3%)
2. Sadri (5.36%)
3. Hindi (1.40%)
4. Others (3.89%)

At the time of the 2011 census, 89.35% of the population spoke Nepali, 5.36% Sadri and 1.40% Hindi as their first language.

The West Bengal Official Language Act 1961 declared that Bengali and Nepali were to be used for official purposes in the three hill subdivisions of Darjeeling, Kalimpong and Kurseong in Darjeeling district.

== Rural Poverty ==
According to the Rural Household Survey in 2005, 24.40% of the total number of families were BPL families in the Darjeeling district. According to a World Bank report, as of 2012, 4-9% of the population in Darjeeling, North 24 Parganas and South 24 Parganas districts were below poverty level, the lowest among the districts of West Bengal, which had an average 20% of the population below poverty line.

== Economy ==
=== Livelihood ===
Livelihood
in Kurseong CD block
1. Cultivators (10.8%)
2. Agricultural labourers (4.96%)
3. Household industries (2.68%)
4. Other Workers (81.6%)

In the Kurseong CD block in 2011, among the class of total workers, cultivators numbered 3,669 and formed 10.75%, agricultural labourers numbered 1,693 and formed 4.96%, household industry workers numbered 913 and formed 2.68% and other workers numbered 7,843 and formed 81.61%. Total workers numbered 34,118 and formed 36.16% of the total population, and non-workers numbered 60,229 and formed 63.84% of the population.

Note: In the census records a person is considered a cultivator, if the person is engaged in cultivation/ supervision of land owned by self/government/institution. When a person who works on another person's land for wages in cash or kind or share, is regarded as an agricultural labourer. Household industry is defined as an industry conducted by one or more members of the family within the household or village, and one that does not qualify for registration as a factory under the Factories Act. Other workers are persons engaged in some economic activity other than cultivators, agricultural labourers and household workers. It includes factory, mining, plantation, transport and office workers, those engaged in business and commerce, teachers, entertainment artistes and so on.

=== Infrastructure ===
There are 65 inhabited villages in the Kurseong CD block, as per the District Census Handbook, Darjiling, 2011. 100% villages have power supply. 100% villages have drinking water supply. 15 villages (23.08%) have post offices. 59 villages (90.77%) have telephones (including landlines, public call offices and mobile phones). 32 villages (49.23%) have pucca (paved) approach roads and 9 villages (13.85%) have transport communication (includes bus service, rail facility and navigable waterways). 2 villages (3.08%) have agricultural credit societies and 4 villages (6.15%) have banks.

=== Agriculture ===
In 2012-13, there were 57 fair price shops in Kurseong CD block.

In 2013–14, Kurseong CD block produced 56 tonnes of Aman paddy, the main winter crop, from 26 hectares, 4 tonnes of Aus paddy (summer crop) from 3 hectares, 3 tonnes of wheat from 3 hectares, 2,055 tonnes of maize from 806 hectares and 6,325 tonnes of potatoes from 382 hectares. It also produced pulses and oilseeds.

=== Tea gardens ===
Darjeeling tea “received the iconic status due to its significant aroma, taste and colour… the first Indian product to be marked with the Geographical Indication (GI) tag in 2003… As per the definition, “Darjeeling Tea” can only refer to tea that has been cultivated, grown, produced, manufactured and processed in tea gardens in few specific hilly areas of the district.” Apart from the hill areas, tea is also grown in the plain areas of the terai and dooars, but such gardens are not covered under the GI tag.

As of 2009-10, there were 87 tea gardens covered under the GI tag, employing 51,091 persons. Total land under cultivation was 17,828.38 hectares and total production was 7.36 million kg. A much larger population is indirectly dependent on the tea industry in the district. The average annual production including those from the plain areas, exceeds 10 million kg.

As of 2013, Darjeeling subdivision had 46 tea estates, Kalimpong subdivision had 29 tea estates and Kurseong subdivision had 6 tea gardens. This added up to 81 tea estates in the hill areas. Bannackburn Tea Estate and Lingia Tea Estate in Darjeeling were the first to come up in 1835. Siliguri subdivision in the terai region had 45 tea estates.

=== Banking ===
In 2012-13, Kurseong CD block had offices of 1 commercial bank and 3 gramin banks.

== Transport ==
Kurseong CD block has 3 originating/ terminating bus routes. The nearest railway station is 2 km from the block headquarters.

National Highway 110 /Hill Cart Road passes through Kurseong CD block.

== Education ==
In 2012-13, Kurseong CD block had 164 primary schools with 8,121 students, 3 middle schools with 721 students, 13 high schools with 5,282 students and 4 higher secondary schools with 2,263 students. Kurseong CD block had 2 technical/ professional institutions with 268 students and 306 institutions for special and non-formal education with 8,880 students. Kurseong municipal area (outside the CD block) had 1 general degree college with 2,034 students and 2 technical/ professional institutions with 598 students.

See also – Education in India

According to the 2011 census, in Kurseong CD block, among the 65 inhabited villages, 6 villages did not have a school, 34 villages had two or more primary schools, 24 villages had at least 1 primary and 1 middle school and 13 villages had at least 1 middle and 1 secondary school.

== Healthcare ==
In 2013, Kurseong CD block had 1 rural hospital and 3 primary health centres with total 68 beds and 4 doctors (excluding private bodies). It had 20 family welfare subcentres.

Dowhill Central Hospital, with 40 beds, is located at Dow Hill and Latpanchar Chincona Plantation Hospital, with 12 beds, is located at Latpanchar,

Sukna Rural Hospital, with 30 beds at Sukna, is the major government medical facility in the Kurseong CD block. There are primary health centres at Bagora (with 10 beds), Sittang (PO Shelpu) (with 4 beds) and Gayabari (with 4 beds).
