= Happy Valley Tea Estate =

Tea estate in Darjeeling, India

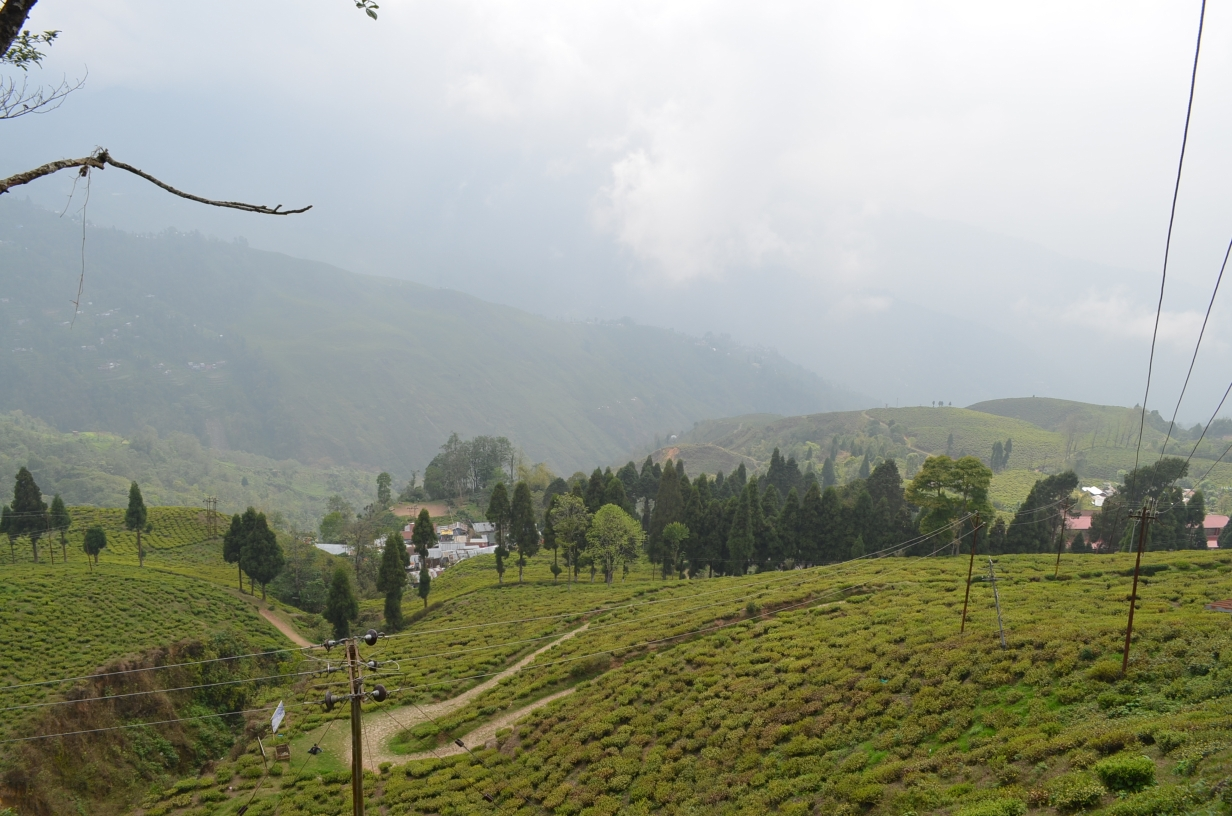
- Happy Valley Tea Estate
- Interactive map of Happy Valley Tea Estate
- Location: Darjeeling district, West Bengal, India
- Coordinates: 27.0521°N 88.258667°E
- Area: 177 ha (440 acres)
- Elevation: 2,100 m (6,900 ft)
- Open: 1854

Happy Valley Tea Estate is a tea garden in Darjeeling district in the Indian state of West Bengal. Established in 1854, it is Darjeeling's second oldest tea estate. Spread over 177 hectares (440 acres), it is situated at a height of 2,100 metres (6,900 ft) above sea level, 3 kilometres (1.9 mi) north of Darjeeling, and employs more than 1500 people.

== History ==
Darjeeling
TE: tea estate, F: facility, T: religious place, I: institute
Abbreviations used in names – TE for Tea Estate
Owing to space constraints in the small map, the actual locations in a larger map may vary slightly
All places marked in the map are linked in the larger full screen map

It is the second oldest tea estate of Darjeeling (after Steinthal Tea Estate, which was established in 1852), and, at a height of 2,100 metres (6,900 ft), is also one of the highest tea factories in the world. David Wilson, an Englishman, had named the garden Wilson Tea Estate and by 1860 had started cultivation of tea. In 1903, the estate was taken over by an Indian, Tarapada Banerjee, an aristocrat from Hooghly. In 1929, Banerjee bought the Windsor Tea Estate nearby, and merged the two estates under the name of Happy Valley Tea Estate. G.C. Banerjee was the next owner of Happy Valley Tea Estate. He with his wife Annapurna Devi and three daughters (Nonimukhi, Monmaya and Savitri) lived there for some time. Annapurna Devi was related to the Ganguly family of Khandwa; her maternal uncle was Kunjalal Bihari, father of the famous cine Gangulys. Nandini Balial (Ganguly), a young prolific writer in LA is the great granddaughter of Late Monmaya Debi.

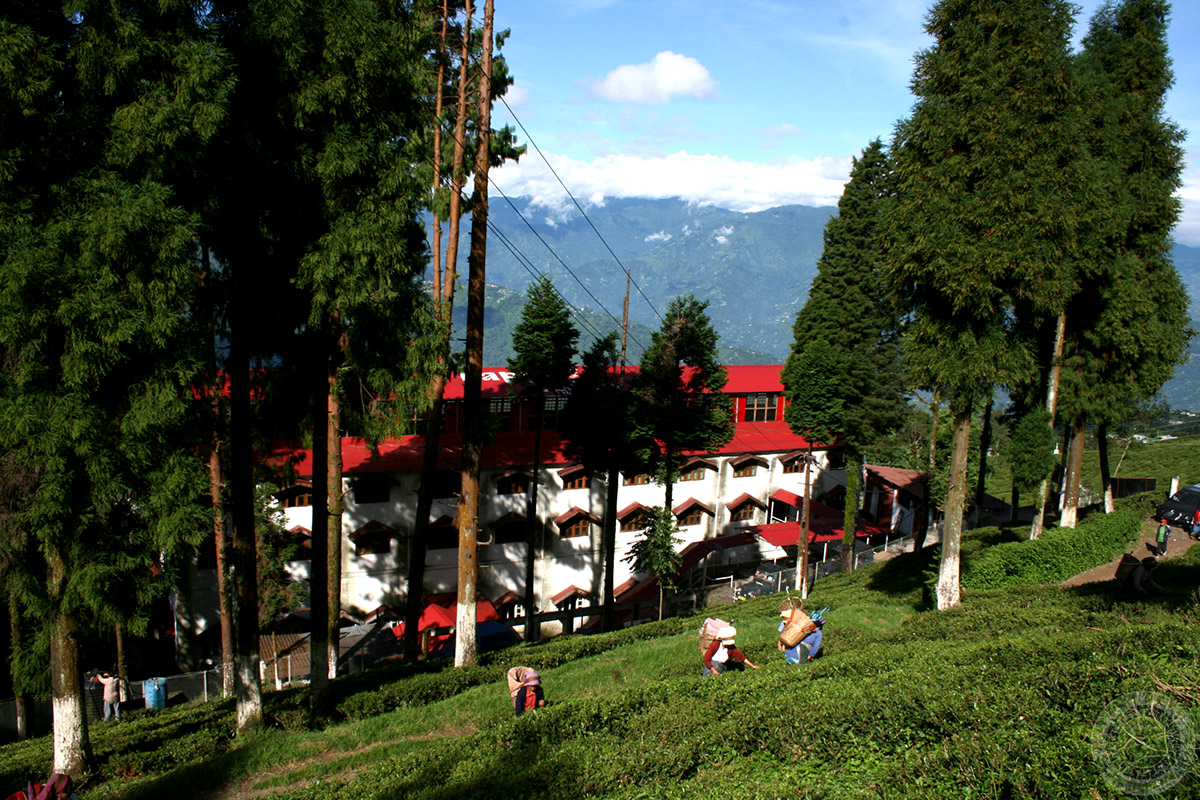
A view of Happy Valley Tea Estate in Darjeeling. It's the nearest Darjeeling Tea estate which is at a walking distance from Darjeeling town.

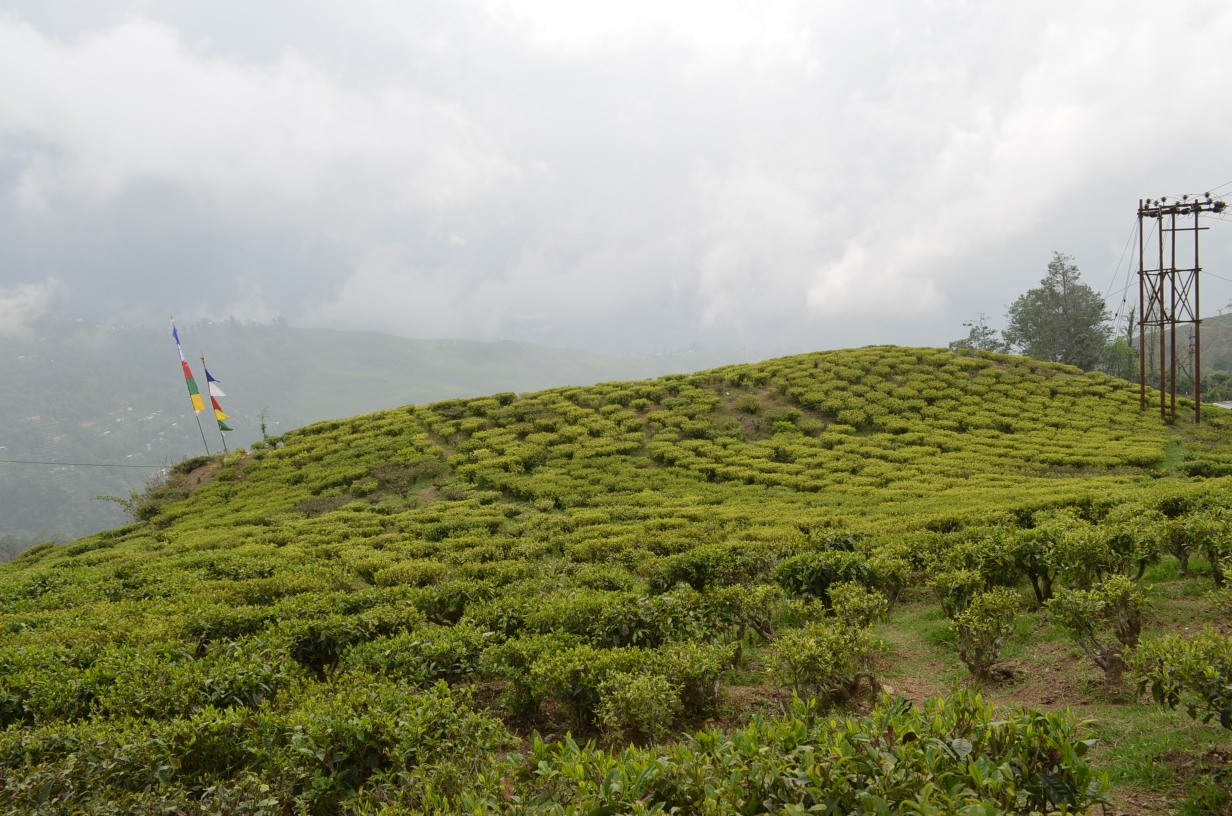
Happy Valley Tea Estate in Darjeeling.

In March 2007, after remaining nearly dormant for nearly four years as the tea industry had experienced a slump, the estate was bought over by S K Bansal, of Ambootia Tea Group, which established a new factory within the premises, and started modernization process, replating and switching to organic farming. Finally, the estate reopened to public in 2008, with the original factory turned into a working museum. It also displayed single piston slow-speed engines, and the shaft machines and sells tea-related mementos. Today, over 1500 people worked in the tea estate and processing unit.

In 2008, the hand-rolled tea produced by Happy Valley was chosen to be sold at Harrods in the United Kingdom, with price ranging from ₹5,000 (US$52) to ₹6,000 (US$63) per kg, besides this, it is also available at Mariage Freres in France.

In late 2022, due to a long going financial distress, Happy Valley along with 5 other gardens were handed over to Mr. Sushil Kumar Agarwal of Lemongrass Organic Tea Estates Pvt. Ltd. (LOTEPL), a Joint Venture between MLA Group and KK Group. With this acquisition, the Sushil Kumar Agarwal led LOTEPL manages 9 Tea Estates in Darjeeling region.

== Overview ==
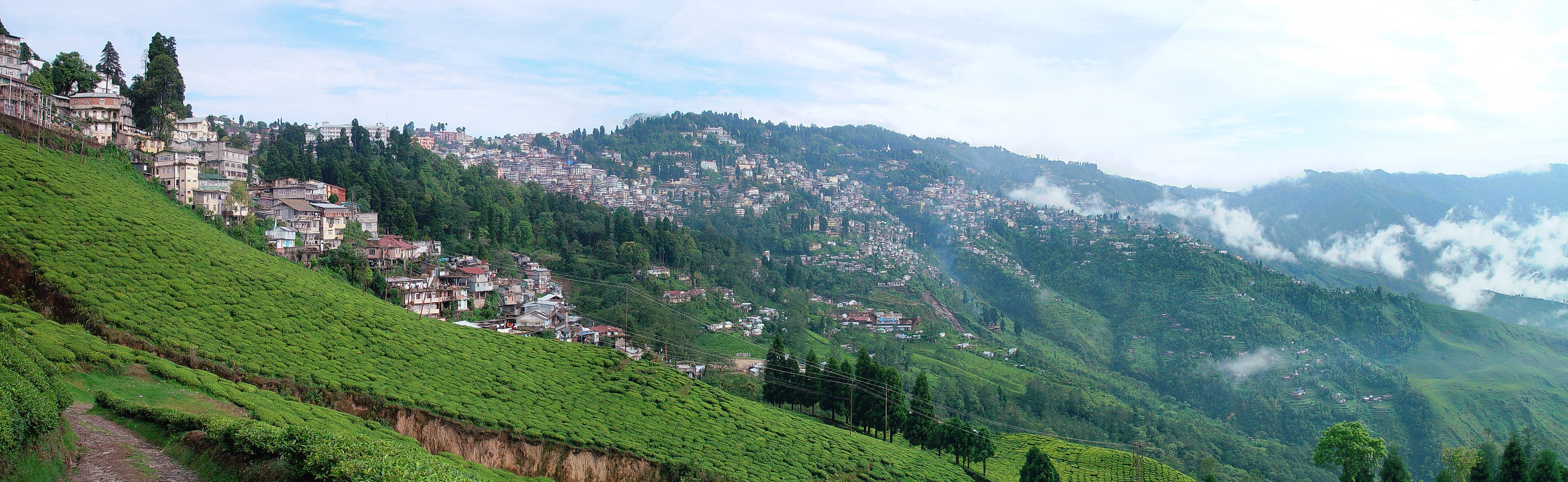
Happy Valley Tea Estate overlooking Darjeeling

The tea estate is spread over 177 hectares (440 acres), at a height of 2,100 metres (6,900 ft). The bushes in the garden are very old — the minimum age is 80 years, and some are 150 years old. Very little re-plantation has been done in the recent past. Situated around 3 km north of town, below Hill Cart Road, accessible via Lochnager Road from Chowk Bazaar, this tea estate is the closest tea estate to Darjeeling town, and tourists often visit the garden. The months of March to May are the busiest time here. when plucking of First Flush season and processing are in progress. It is open all 7 days a week from 9 a.m. to 4:30 p.m.

== LOTEPL group ==
The gardens of the Lemongrass Organic Tea Estates Private Ltd. are: Ambootia, Nagri, Chongtong, Moondakotee, Happy Valley, Mullootar, Sepoydhoorah (Chamling) and Sivitar.
