= Kurseong Assembly constituency =

Kurseong
- Constituency No. 24 for the West Bengal Legislative Assembly
- Interactive Map Outlining Kurseong Assembly Constituency

Constituency details
- Country: India
- Region: East India
- State: West Bengal
- District: Darjeeling
- Lok Sabha constituency: Darjeeling
- Established: 1951
- Total electors: 218,103
- Reservation: None

Member of Legislative Assembly
- 18th West Bengal Legislative Assembly
- Incumbent Sonam Lama
- Party: Bharatiya Janata Party
- Elected year: 2026
- Preceded by: Bishnu Prasad Sharma

Most Successful parties
1. Independent (4 times) (20.0%)
2. Communist Party of India (Marxist) (3 times) (15.0%)
3. Gorkha National Liberation Front (3 times) (15.0%)
4. Akhil Bharatiya Gorkha League (2 times) (10.0%)
5. Bharatiya Janata Party (2 times) (10.0%)
6. Communist Party of India (2 times) (10.0%)
7. Gorkha Janmukti Morcha (2 times) (10.0%)
8. Indian National Congress (2 times) (10.0%)

Kurseong Assembly constituency is an assembly constituency in Darjeeling district in the Indian state of West Bengal.

== Overview ==
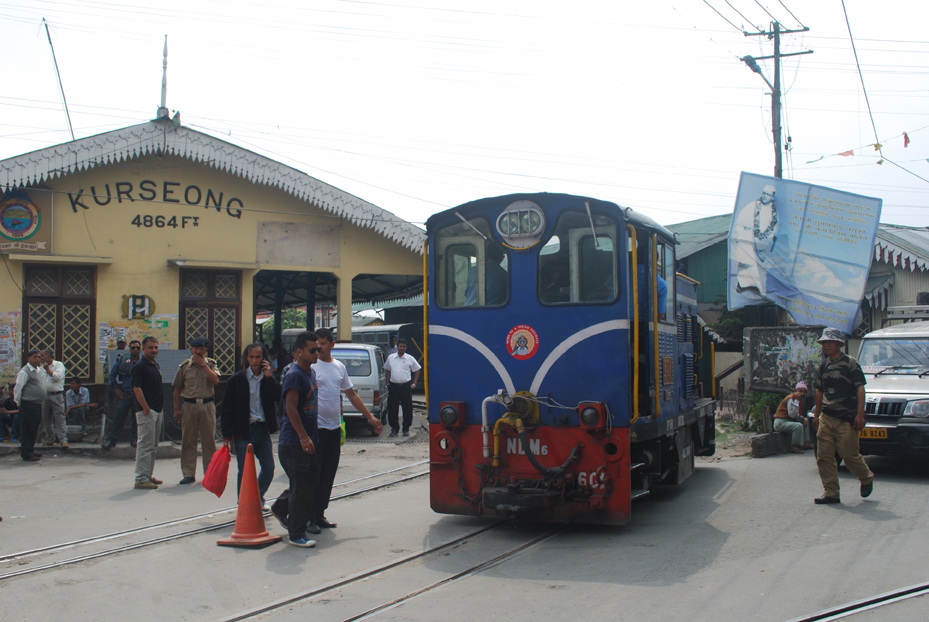
Kurseong train building

As per orders of the Delimitation Commission, No. 24 Kurseong Assembly constituency covers Kurseong municipality, Kurseong community development block, Mirik municipality, Mirik community development block, Rangli Rangliot community development block, Gorabari Margaret's Hope, Lower Sonada I, Lower Sonada II, Munda Kothi and Upper Sonada gram panchayats of Jorebunglow Sukhiapokhri community development block, and (i) Sitong Forest (Village), (ii) Sivok Hill Forest (Village), and (iii) Sivok Forest (Village) in Champasari GP of Matigara community development block.

Kurseong Assembly constituency is part of No. 4 Darjeeling (Lok Sabha constituency).

== Members of the Legislative Assembly ==
Year	Member	Party
Kurseong-Siliguri
1951	Tenzing Wangdi	Indian National Congress
1951	George Mahbert	Independent politician
Jore Bungalow
1951	Shiva Kumar Rai	Independent politician
1957	Bhadra Bahadur Hamal	Communist Party of India
1962	Bhadra Bahadur Hamal	Communist Party of India
1967	Nanda Lal Gurung	Independent politician
1969	Nanda Lal Gurung	Akhil Bharatiya Gorkha League
1971	Ananda Prasad Pathak	Communist Party of India (Marxist)
1972	Nanda Lal Gurung	Akhil Bharatiya Gorkha League
Kurseong
1977	Dawa Narbula	Indian National Congress
1982	Harka Bahadur Rai	Communist Party of India (Marxist)
1987	Harka Bahadur Rai	Communist Party of India (Marxist)
1991	Nar Bahadur Chhetri	Independent politician
1996	Shanta Chhetri	Gorkha National Liberation Front
2001	Shanta Chhetri	Gorkha National Liberation Front
2006	Shanta Chhetri	Gorkha National Liberation Front
2011	Rohit Sharma	Gorkha Janmukti Morcha
2016	Rohit Sharma	Gorkha Janmukti Morcha
2021	Bishnu Prasad Sharma	Bharatiya Janata Party
2026	Sonam Lama	Bharatiya Janata Party

== Election results ==
Vote share of Winning candidates
2026	41.18%
2021	41.86%
2016	53.03%
2011	74.00%
2006	53.56%
2001	53.29%
1996	54.23%
1991	55.09%
1987	76.37%
1982	47.56%
1977	27.57%
1972	34.12%
1971	38.57%
1969	58.60%
1967	42.96%
1962	41.71%
1957	32.52%
1951	64.42%
1951 (2 seats)	16.65%
1951 (2 seats)	16.13%

=== 2026 ===
2026 West Bengal Legislative Assembly election: Kurseong
Party	Candidate	Votes	%	±%
BJP	Sonam Lama	74,878	41.18	▼0.68
BGPM	Amar Lama	57,871	31.83	New entry
IND	Bandana Rai	41,088	22.60	New entry
CPI(M)	Uttam Brahman	1,690	0.93	▼0.52
INC	Saroj Kumar Khattri	1,651	0.91	▼1.86
IND	Sumendra Tamang	1,488	0.82	New entry
IND	Mohan Sharma	1,399	0.77	New entry
NOTA	Nota	1,768	0.97	▼0.41
Majority		17,007	9.35	▲0.51
Turnout		181,833	83.37	▲9.14
Registered electors		218,103		▼7.77
BJP hold		Swing	0.25	

=== 2021 ===
2021 West Bengal Legislative Assembly election: Kurseong
Party	Candidate	Votes	%	±%
BJP	Bishnu Prasad Sharma	73,475	41.86	
IND	Tshering Lama	57,960	33.02	
IND	Narbu Lama	33,094	18.85	
CPI(M)	Uttam Brahman	2,545	1.45	
NOTA	None of the Above	2,417	1.38	
IND	Ugam Lama	2,299	1.31	
IND	Bikram Rai	1,429	0.81	
IND	Pranav Pradhan	1,366	0.78	
IND	Bhupendra Lepcha	960	0.55	
Majority		15,515	8.84	
Turnout		175,545	74.23	
Swing to BJP from GJM		Swing		

=== 2016 ===
2016 West Bengal Legislative Assembly election: Kurseong
Party	Candidate	Votes	%	±%
GJM	Rohit Sharma	86,947	53.03	
AITC	Shanta Chhetri	53,221	32.46	
IND	Arun Kumar Ghatani	12,219	7.45	
NOTA	None of the Above	7,426	4.53	
GRC	Dhurba Dewan	4,160	2.54	
Majority		33,726	20.57	
Turnout		163,973	72.62	
GJM hold		Swing		

=== 2011 ===
2011 West Bengal Legislative Assembly election: Kurseong
Party	Candidate	Votes	%	±%
GJM	Rohit Sharma	114,297	74.00	
GNLF	Pemu Chhetri	21,201	13.73	
IND	Bhupendra Lepcha	5,963	3.86	
ABGL	Shiva Kumar Pradhan	4,463	2.89	
INC	Chhabi Chandra Rai	4,272	2.77	
CPI(M)	Deepa Chhetri	4,253	2.75	
Majority		93,096	60.27	
Turnout		154,449	78.19	
Swing to GJM from GNLF		Swing		

=== 2006 ===
2006 West Bengal Legislative Assembly election: Kurseong
Party	Candidate	Votes	%	±%
GNLF	Shanta Chhetri	63,295	53.56	
IND	Buddhiman Rai	30,237	25.59	
CPI(M)	Mahendra Chhetri	20,490	17.34	
BSP	Matilda Gurung	4,146	3.51	
Majority		33,058	27.98	
Turnout		118,168		
GNLF hold		Swing		

=== 2001 ===
2001 West Bengal Legislative Assembly election: Kurseong
Party	Candidate	Votes	%	±%
GNLF	Shanta Chettri	55,630	53.29	
CPI(M)	Tulsi Bhattrai	24,729	23.69	
IND	Pradip Pradhan	14,854	14.23	
BJP	Balaram Chhetri	9,180	8.79	
Majority		30,901	29.60	
Turnout		104,431	60.81	
GNLF hold		Swing		

=== 1996 ===
1996 West Bengal Legislative Assembly election: Kurseong
Party	Candidate	Votes	%	±%
GNLF	Shanta Chhetri	59,635	54.23	
CPI(M)	Tulsi Bhattarai	40,674	36.99	
ABGL	Manoj Dewan	7,637	6.94	
AIIC(T)	Parbati Pradhan (Paru Rai)	2,027	1.84	
Majority		18,961	17.24	
Turnout		115,250	75.87	
GNLF hold		Swing		

=== 1991 ===
1991 West Bengal Legislative Assembly election: Kurseong
Party	Candidate	Votes	%	±%
IND	Nar Bahadur Chettri	50,487	55.09	
CPI(M)	Dawa Lama	36,705	40.05	
BJP	Raj Gopal Bhandari	2,268	2.47	
IND	Ashok Ghattani	1,322	1.44	
IND	Saran Dewan	864	0.94	
Majority		13,782	15.04	
Turnout		103,582	73.13	
Swing to Independent from CPI(M)		Swing		

=== 1987 ===
1987 West Bengal Legislative Assembly election: Kurseong
Party	Candidate	Votes	%	±%
CPI(M)	Harka Bahadur Rai	5,607	76.37	
INC	A. N. Pradhan	1,538	20.95	
IND	Sunu Rai	160	2.18	
IND	Tularam Rai	37	0.50	
Majority		4,069	55.42	
Turnout		7,802	6.76	
CPI(M) hold		Swing		

=== 1982 ===
1982 West Bengal Legislative Assembly election: Kurseong
Party	Candidate	Votes	%	±%
CPI(M)	H. B. Rai	28,170	47.56	
INC	Dawa Norbula	27,889	47.09	
IND	Bishnu Gahatraj	3,171	5.35	
Majority		281	0.47	
Turnout		61,400	62.50	
Swing to CPI(M) from INC		Swing		

=== 1977 ===
1977 West Bengal Legislative Assembly election: Kurseong
Party	Candidate	Votes	%	±%
INC	Dawa Norbula	11,941	27.57	
CPI(M)	Anand Pathak	10,390	23.99	
IND	Prithwi Raj Giri	8,117	18.74	
JP	Prem Thapa	6,663	15.38	
IND	Anta Narayan Pradhan	2,924	6.75	
IND	P. B. Gurung	2,649	6.12	
ABGL	Amar Prokash Dimmal	427	0.99	
IND	Bir Bahadur Lohar	204	0.47	
Majority		1,551	3.58	
Turnout		44,336	52.35	
Swing to INC from ABGL		Swing		

=== 1972 ===
1972 West Bengal Legislative Assembly election: Jore Bungalow
Party	Candidate	Votes	%	±%
ABGL	Nanda Lal Gurung	12,063	34.12	
INC	Dawa Bomjan	11,517	32.58	
CPI(M)	Ananda Prasad Pathak	11,031	31.20	
IND	Prem Thapa	740	2.09	
Majority		546	1.54	
Turnout		36,995	60.35	
Swing to ABGL from CPI(M)		Swing		

=== 1971 ===
1971 West Bengal Legislative Assembly election: Jore Bungalow
Party	Candidate	Votes	%	±%
CPI(M)	Ananda Prasad Pathak	12,858	38.57	
ABGL	Nandalall Gurung	12,572	37.72	
INC	P. B. Gurung	6,341	19.02	
INC(O)	Indra Bahadur Thakuri	1,562	4.69	
Majority		286	0.85	
Turnout		35,405	60.69	
Swing to CPI(M) from ABGL		Swing		

=== 1969 ===
1969 West Bengal Legislative Assembly election: Jore Bungalow
Party	Candidate	Votes	%	±%
ABGL	Nandalal Gurung	15,693	58.60	
INC	Padam Bahadur Gurung	11,085	41.40	
Majority		4,608	17.20	
Turnout		27,928	49.86	
ABGL hold		Swing		

=== 1967 ===
1967 West Bengal Legislative Assembly election: Jore Bungalow
Party	Candidate	Votes	%	±%
IND	N. Gurung	12,428	42.96	
INC	P. B. Gurung	10,501	36.30	
CPI(M)	R. Brahman	6,001	20.74	
Majority		1,927	6.66	
Turnout		30,609	55.56	
Swing to Independent from CPI		Swing		

=== 1962 ===
1962 West Bengal Legislative Assembly election: Jore Bungalow
Party	Candidate	Votes	%	±%
CPI	Bhadra Bahadur Hamal	8,961	41.71	
ABGL	Nandalal Gurung	8,832	41.11	
INC	Rustam Ali	3,689	17.17	
Majority		129	0.60	
Turnout		22,488	38.41	
CPI hold		Swing		

=== 1957 ===
1957 West Bengal Legislative Assembly election: Jore Bungalow
Party	Candidate	Votes	%	±%
CPI	Bhadra Bahadur Hamal	4,924	32.52	
IND	Pema Tshering Lama	4,013	26.50	
INC	Shiva Kumar Rai	3,499	23.11	
IND	Rustom Ali	1,317	8.70	
IND	Prithwilall Subba	873	5.77	
IND	Ram Chandrra Tamang	517	3.41	
Majority		911	6.02	
Turnout		15,143	31.22	
Swing to CPI from Independent		Swing		

=== 1951 ===
1951 West Bengal Legislative Assembly election: Jore Bungalow
Party	Candidate	Votes	%	±%
IND	Shiva Kumar Rai	9,048	64.42	
CPI	Ganeshlal Subba	2,834	20.18	
INC	Balbahadur Chettri	2,163	15.40	
Majority		6,214	44.24	
Turnout		14,045	36.20	
Independent win (new seat)				

=== 1951 (2 seats) ===
1951 West Bengal Legislative Assembly election: Kurseong Siliguri (2 seats)
Party	Candidate	Votes	%	±%
IND	George Mahbert	8,255	16.65	
INC	Birendra Nath Ray Sarkar	8,000	16.13	
INC	Tenzing Wangdi	7,574	15.27	
IND	Nima Wangi Lama	6,876	13.87	
CPI	Bandhan Oraon	6,441	12.99	
KMPP	Kshirod Nath Chattopadhyay	5,823	11.74	
IND	Khagendra Nath Ray	2,740	5.53	
Socialist	Ranjay Wangboo	1,534	3.09	
IND	Sudhindra Nath Chakravarty	1,188	2.40	
Socialist	Basanta Ghosh	1,159	2.34	
Majority		255	0.52	
Turnout		49,590	57.23	
