= Kurseong subdivision =

- Subdivision
- Country: India
- State: West Bengal
- District: Darjeeling
- Headquarters: Kurseong

Area
  - Total: 377.35 km^{2} (145.70 sq mi)

Population
  - Total: 136,793
  - Density: 362.51/km^{2} (938.90/sq mi)

Languages
  - Official: Bengali, Nepali
- Time zone: UTC+5:30 (IST)

Kurseong subdivision is a subdivision of the Darjeeling district in the state of West Bengal, India. It was handed to the British Empire by the King of Sikkim in 1835. In Lepcha, Kurseong translates to the land of white orchids. It is one of the oldest municipalities in the undivided Indian subcontinent.

== Demographics ==
According to the 2011 census, Hindus and Buddhists form the majority of the population, with 60.43% and 25.12% of residents respectively. Christians formed the third largest community with 8.68% of residents being Christian. There is a small Muslim community, forming 4.42% of the population. 1.35% of Kurseong residents belong to other faiths (such as Animism) or are Atheists. As of the municipality's 2025 census, there are a total of 68103 residents in Kurseong. The literacy rate is higher than the national average, with 89.33% of residents being literate.

Religion in Kurseong sub-division (2011)
1. Hinduism (60.4%)
2. Buddhism (25.1%)
3. Christianity (8.68%)
4. Islam (4.42%)
5. Others (1.35%)
Languages spoken in Mirik Taluka, 2011
1. Nepali (84.0%)
2. Bengali (6.23%)
3. Hindi (4.29%)
4. Others (5.50%)

== Gram Panchayats ==
Gram Panchayats in Kurseong subdivision include rural areas, with several panchayats across the blocks. A few prominent gram panchayats in Kurseong block include Rangbull, Mahanadi and Kurseong town. The town consists of 20 wards, with the local census being taken every 4-5 years.

== Education ==
Subdivision	Primary School		Middle School		High School		Higher Secondary School		General College, Univ		Technical / Professional Instt		Non-formal Education	
Subdivision	Institution	Student	Institution	Student	Institution	Student	Institution	Student	Institution	Student	Institution	Student	Institution	Student
Darjeeling Sadar	579	37,345	28	8,019	37	22,579	23	16,492	7	9,510	6	1,095	1,142	28,425
Kurseong	218	13,031	3	721	28	10,596	9	7,783	1	2,034	4	866	367	14,261
Mirik	78	7,211	3	919	6	2,131	2	2,127	1	715	-	-	309	20,265
Siliguri	676	79,713	30	8,585	46	23,903	67	100,845	10	13,398	13	3,161	1,793	96,766
Darjeeling district	1,551	137,300	64	18,244	117	59,290	101	127,247	19	25,657	23	5,122	3,611	159,717

== Infrastructure & Development ==
In recent years, development has brough rapid changes in Kurseong communities. However, landslides often bring life to a halt with a serious risk to human life and property. Several joint projects/ventures related to water management and waste treatment have been launched, some with international cooperation and some with funding from the centre. There are several schools in the subdivision, although many go to bigger nearby cities like Darjeeling. There is one general hospital which serves the needs for Kurseong residents. There are many tourist spots such as a museum dedicated to the freedom fighter Subhas Chandra Bose, ancient Hindu temples, Buddhist Gompas, scenic water falls and multiple colonial-era tea gardens.

== Legislative Segments ==
As per order of the Delimitation Commission in respect of the delimitation of constituencies in West Bengal, the whole area under this subdivision is part of the Kurseong assembly constituency of West Bengal. This constituency is an assembly segment of Darjeeling Lok Sabha constituency.
