= Lopchu Tea Estate =

Tea garden in Rangli Rangliot, India

- Interactive map of Lopchu Tea Estate
- Location: Darjeeling district, West Bengal, India
- Coordinates: 27.074533°N 88.369637°E
- Area: 226 acres (91 ha)
- Elevation: 4,800 feet (1,500 m)
- Owner: Rajesh Kanoria, Sandeep Kanoria
- Open: early 1860s

Lopchu Tea Estate is a tea garden in the Rangli Rangliot CD block in the Darjeeling Sadar subdivision of the Darjeeling district in the Indian state of West Bengal.

== Etymology ==
"Lopchu" is a derivative from Lepcha language, which prevailed in the area when the garden was set up.

== History ==
Lopchu Tea Estate was owned by British planters, possibly the Brown family, in its earlier days. The garden was established in the early 1860s.

In 1954, Lopchu Tea Estate was purchased by S.N.Kanoria and G.L.Kanoria, two cousins and both jute traders. Now, their grandsons, Rajesh Kanoria and Sandeep Kanoria, own the garden.

== Geography ==
Places and tea estates in the north-eastern portion of Darjeeling Sadar subdivision (including Rangli Rangliot CD block) and Kurseong subdivision in Darjeeling district
CT: census town, R: rural/ urban centre, N: neighbourhood, H: hill centre, NP: national park/ wildlife sanctuary, TE: tea estate, TA: tourist attraction
Abbreviations used in names – TG for Tea Garden (town/village), TE for Tea Estate
Owing to space constraints in the small map, the actual locations in a larger map may vary slightly

Lopchu Tea Estate is located north-east of Darjeeling, mid-way between Darjeeling and Kalimpong, and close to Sikkim. The nearest Darjeeling tea estate is Glenburn Tea Estate, separated by a hill. Takdah is also close-by.

Located at a height of 4,800 feet (1,500 m) nestles in a glen overlooking the majestic Kangchenjunga peak.

Lopchu has 226 acres (91 ha) under tea cultivation. Most of tea plants were transplanted from Yunan province in China, and much of the tea gets exported to Germany and other European countries.

Note: The map alongside presents some of the notable locations in the subdivision. All places marked in the map are linked in the larger full screen map.

== Lopchu tea ==
The Economic Times says that Lopchu, a 90-year old tea brand, "has won a dedicated, global following after enduring tough competition." Many of the leading Indian tea connoisseurs love its aroma and smoky taste.
