= McLeod Russel =

Indian tea company

McLeod Russel India Ltd
- Traded as: BSE: 532654, NSE: MCLEODRUSS
- Industry: Tea
- Founded: 1869
- Headquarters: Kolkata, West Bengal, India
- Owner: Mr. Aditya Khaitan (Chairman & Managing Director)
- Number of employees: 90,000
- Website: www.mcleodrussel.com

McLeod Russel India Ltd is an Indian tea company. It is currently the world's largest tea growing company.

It is part of the Williamson Magor Group. It has thirty-one tea estates in the Brahmaputra Valley of Assam and two in the Dooars region of West Bengal, three factories in Vietnam and six estates in Uganda.

McLeod Russel produces more than 90 million kilograms of black tea every year.

== History ==
The tale of McLeod Russel began in 1869 when Captain J.H. Williamson and Richard Boycott Magor, two Calcutta-based Englishmen, formed a partnership firm, Williamson Magor & Company, to service the requirements of tea estates in Assam. Brij Mohan Khaitan, who had a long-standing relationship with the Company by virtue of being the principal supplier of Packaging Materials and Fertilizers, was invited to join the Board of Directors in 1963. Mr. B. M. Khaitan eventually became the Managing Director in 1964 and took the Company to new heights.

Over the next half century, the McLeod Russel group has grown and acquired a number of well-established and internationally recognised tea companies, including Williamson Tea Assam, Doom Dooma Tea Company, Moran Tea Company in India, Phu Ben Tea Company in Vietnam and Rwenzori Tea Investments.

It has another subsidiary in Uganda, Mcleod Russel Uganda Limited which cultivates, manufactures and markets tea. It was formerly known as James Finlay (Uganda) Limited. The company was founded in 1994 and is based in Kampala.

Shortly before the death of B.M. Khaitan in 2019, his younger son Aditya Khaitan, has taken over as chairman of McLeod Russel.

== Operations ==
The company's corporate office is situated at 4, Mangoe Lane, Surendra Mohan Ghosh Sarani, Kolkata. As the world's largest producer of bulk tea, McLeod Russel has two tea blending units - the Nilpur Blending Unit, in Assam and the Dubai Blending Unit, in Dubai.

Since 2018 McLeod has to deal with a liquidity crisis. It is reported that in the company's Tea Estate in Assam "most of the working community lives in penury even today".

== See also ==
- History of tea in India
- Indian Tea Association
- Tea Board of India
- Assam Tea
- Darjeeling Tea
- North Bengal Tea Industry
