= Assam Chah Mazdoor Sangha =

- Founded: 1958
- Headquarters: Jiban Phukan Nagar, Dibrugarh
- Location: India
- Members: 435,207 (2018)
- Key people: Paban Singh Ghatowar (President), Rupesh Gowalla (General Secretary)
- Affiliations: INTUC, BWI, IUF
- Website: assamchahmazdoorsangha.org

The Assam Chah Mazdoor Sangha (translation: Assam Tea Workers Union, abbreviated ACMS) is the largest trade union organizing labourers in tea gardens of the Assam Valley in north-eastern India. The union is affiliated with the Indian National Trade Union Congress (INTUC). As of the early 2000s, ACMS claimed a membership of 1.1 million (another figure, presented in 2009, put the total membership at 435,207). The organisational network of ACMS includes 850 company tea gardens.

== History ==
ACMS was founded in the 1958. After the Independence of India, the Indian National Congress leaders in Assam sought to strengthen INTUC in order to counter the influence of communist unions affiliated with the All India Trade Union Congress. ACMS was set up by the Dibrugarh Congress leader Mohendra Nath Sarmah and a grouping of tea garden trade unionist leaders. An agreement was reached between the Assam Chief Minister Gopinath Bordoloi, INTUC and the Indian Tea Association (ITA). INTUC promised the plantation owners not to engage in 'disruptive' union activism whilst Indian Tea Association promised INTUC free access to organising in the tea gardens. Through this agreement with the tea plantation owners, ACMS was able to establish a virtual monopoly over labour organising in the Assam Valley tea gardens.

== Leadership ==
During its initial phase, the leadership of ACMS tended to be dominated by upper-caste Hindus who themselves were not tea labourers. However, over time an 'insider' cadre of leaders from within the ranks of the tea labourers emerged. Prominent leaders in the history of ACMS includes Kamakhya Prosad Tripathi, Bijoy Chandra Bhagoboti, Amiyo Kumar Das, Keder Nath Goswami, Robin Kakoti, Mahendra Nath Sharma, Ghanakanta Moran, Jadunath Bhuyan, Dolbir Singh Lohar, Chanu Kharia, Durgeswar Saikia, Jogendra Nath Rajmedhi, Molia Tanti, Radhanath Khemka, Sarbeswar Bordolai, Durgeswar Saikia, Lakhan Chandra Karmakar, Narad Kumar, Probin Goswami, Mohitush Purakayastha, Chatragopal Karmakar, Sunil Kumar Nag, Prafulla Sarkar, Harlal Garh, Dipak Murmoo, Surendra Nath Mishra, Luthru Bhumij, Tarun Chutia, Durga Prosad Khargoria, Patras Ekka, Lokeswar Gogoi, Satya Narayan Ram, Bancha Saikia, Hemanta Dutta, Mahananda Bora, Labanya Deka, Joy Chandra Das, Santosh Kumar Sinha, Munia Bhat and many others which was registered under Indian Trade Union Act 1926 on District wise unit basis.

Union office bearers are elected for three-year terms. As of 2018, Paban Singh Ghatowar (a Congress Party Lok Sabha ex-member from Dibrugarh) served as the President of ACMS and Rupesh Gowalla as its General Secretary.

== Political role ==
ACMS is a politically important pillar for the influence of the Congress Party in Assam. Through ACMS the party is able to wield significant voters' support in five Lok Sabha constituencies; Kaliabor, Jorhat, Dibrugarh, Mangaldoi and Lakhimpur (these areas also correspond to roughly half of the Vidhan Sabha seats of Assam). However in recent times, the Congress has lost ground to the Bharatiya Janata Party in these regions, as the political discourse shifted away from labour movements to anti-Bengali sentiment triggered by concerns of demographic change caused by illegal immigration of Bengali Muslims from the Bangladesh border, centering around the NRC exercise & Citizenship Amendment Act.

== Organisation ==
ACMS has 22 branch organisations. The union has its headquarters at Jiban Phukan Nagar in Dibrugarh. In total ACMS and its local branches has a staff of 380 persons (as of 2018).

As of 2018, the membership fee of ACMS stood at ₹60. Moreover, each member is obliged to pay 12% of his/her gross income to the Provident Fund. As of 2009 the Provident Fund stood at ₹27 billion, gathered through contributions of its members.

ACMS is affiliated with the Building and Wood Workers' International and the International Union of Food, Agricultural, Hotel, Restaurant, Catering, Tobacco and Allied Workers' Association.

In the Cachar, another tea-producing region of Assam, INTUC has another affiliate, the Cachar Chah Sramik Union.

== See also ==
- Assam Tea
- Darjeeling Tea
- Indian Tea Association
