= Rajah Banerjee =

Tea planter and environmentalist

Swaraj Kumar Banerjee
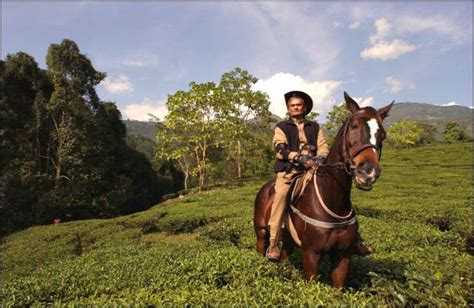
- Rajah Banerjee at Makaibari Tea Estate
- Born: 16 August 1948 (age 78); Makaibari Tea Estate, Darjeeling, West Bengal, India
- Other name: Rajah Banerjee
- Occupations: Environmentalist, Tea Planter, Writer

Rajah Banerjee, or Swaraj Kumar Banerjee, is a tea planter, environmentalist and a writer, best known for his stewardship of his ancestral Makaibari Tea Estate in Darjeeling. His family was the proprietor of Makaibari Tea Estate from 1859 to 2017, and he was the fourth generation manager of Makaibari. He is a pioneer of the organic movement in Darjeeling. Under his guardianship, Makaibari was made organic and bio - dynamic. He is famous for his unique Silver Needle Moonlight Plucked Teas, which is only plucked at midnight on a full moon's night during the spring season, in Darjeeling.

Rajah holds the world record for the most expensive tea ever sold in a wholesale auction, at ₹1.11 lakh per kilogram. He has had multiple documentaries made about him like Lord of Darjeeling by Xavier de Lauzanne, Hamro Makaibari by Vikram Rai and has also featured in Vir Sanghvi's series 'A Matter of Taste'.

During his 44-year tenure at Makaibari, he converted it into "an organic oasis, with a dense forest cover." He is credited with having planted close to 2 million trees at Makaibari, and also creating the Makaibari Joint Body (MBJB) which focused on improving the lives of the community members at the tea estate. Rajah is an ambassador for Darjeeling Tea worldwide. Makaibari was the official tea partner for the 2008 Beijing Olympics, as well as the 2014 FIFA World Cup. On Prime Minister Modi's 2015 visit to the United Kingdom, he gifted a batch of Rajah's special Imperial Needles Darjeeling Tea to the Queen

Rajah now runs the artisanal tea brand - Rimpocha

== Early life ==
Rajah did his schooling in Darjeeling and completed his undergraduate degree at the University of London in England. He returned to India in 1970 where he was persuaded to take up the stewardship of the Makaibari Tea Estate.

== Career ==
Rajah took over stewardship of the Makaibari Tea Estate in 1970. Under his guardianship, Makaibari was the first garden amongst Darjeeling's 87 tea gardens to become completely organic. Subsequently, he also converted Makaibari into bio-dynamic status, on the basis of the philosophy of Rudolf Steiner.

Over the next decade, Rajah mentored a number of Darjeeling tea gardens like Longview Tea Estate and converted them into organic as well. During this period Rajah had numerous films and documentaries made about him and his practices at Makaibari. These included focusing on women's empowerment through the homestay initiative, improving education and health facilities for the community members, increasing the overall income levels of the community members through biodynamic practices. These initiatives were supported by the Makaibari Joint Body (MBJB). Rajah also focused on ensuring that Makaibari was a space open for research, art, and culture. The filmmaker Chaitanya Tamhane's first film "Six Strands" was in fact shot at Makaibari in 2011. In addition to that, multiple research papers and dissertations have been written by students during their time volunteering or interning at Makaibari.

In 2014, Rajah sold the majority of his ownership of the Makaibari Garden to the Kolkata-based Luxmi group. However, in 2017, he had a disagreement with them about management practices. Later that year, his heritage bungalow at the garden burnt down, and subsequently he exited the tea estate, and relinquished all management control.

In 2018, Rajah started an artisanal tea brand known as Rimpocha, in order to mentor small growers of Darjeeling.

== Awards and recognition ==
- 1988 - Makaibari becomes the first Darjeeling tea garden to be certified as organic
- 1991 - The Makaibari Joint Body (MBJB) is set up to advocate for social reform and women's rights in Makaibari
- 1993 - Makaibari becomes the first tea garden to be accorded the Demeter Certification for biodynamic production
- 2008 - TIME Magazine cover story - "The Best Of Asia" features Makaibari for quality and ethical labour practices
- 2014 - Rajah sets the world record for the most expensive tea sold at $1850 per kg
- 2015 - Makaibari Tea is gifted to Queen Elizabeth II of England by Prime Minister Narendra Modi
