= Lebong Valley =

Valley near Darjeeling, India

Lebong
- Coordinates: 27°03′34″N 88°16′43″E

Lebong (लेबोङ) is a region located to the north of Darjeeling in the Indian state of West Bengal. It comprises the administrative units of Lebong Valley Gram Panchayat I and Lebong Valley Gram Panchayat II under the Darjeeling Pulbazar Block, along with Ward No. 32 of the Darjeeling Municipality.

The valley forms part of the Eastern Himalayan landscape and lies within close proximity to the urban centre of Darjeeling, functioning as both a residential and semi-urban extension of the town. It includes local urban centres such as Lebong Golai Bazar and Cricket Bazar, which serve as important hubs for commerce and daily activity in the area.

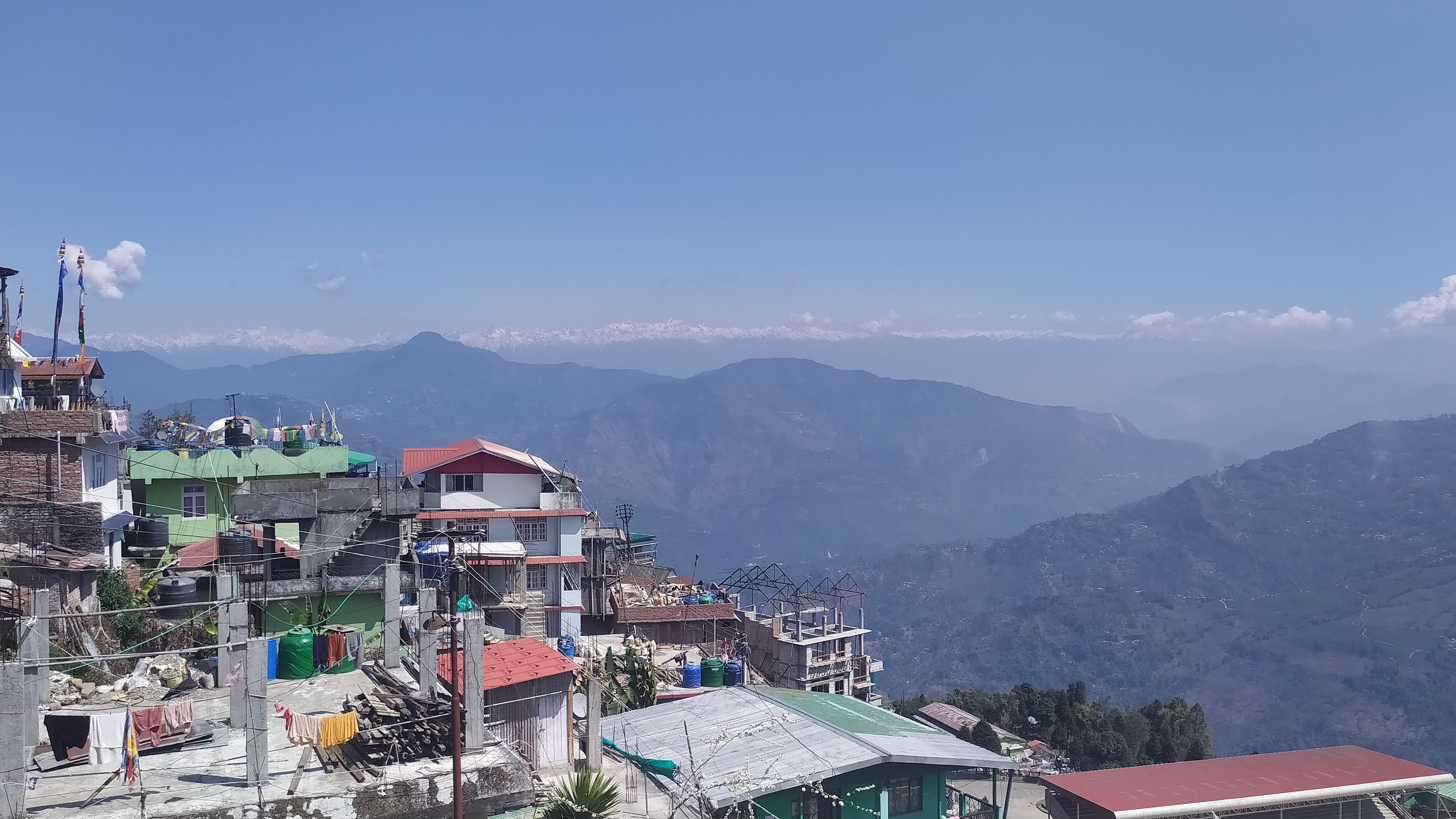
Lebong Valley, with the hills of Sikkim

Lebong is also historically and culturally significant, known for the nearby Lebong Race Course, one of the highest racecourses in the world, and for its scenic setting of Tea plantations within the Himalayas.

== Lebong Race course ==
The Lebong Race Course is a historic site located in the Lebong Valley, to the east of Darjeeling. Established in 1882 alongside the Lebong Cantonment, it formed part of the British colonial military and recreational infrastructure in the region and was associated with various British Army regiments stationed in the area.

The racecourse has often been described as one of the highest and smallest in the world. It measures approximately 480 metres in length, considerably shorter than standard racecourses, and is situated within a narrow valley surrounded by Himalayan terrain.

The formal use of the site for racing was governed by a lease agreement dated 20 September 1924 between the General Officer Commanding (GOC), Presidency of Assam District, and the Darjeeling Amusement Club, later known as the Darjeeling Gymkhana Club. The racecourse continued to operate under this arrangement until 1984.

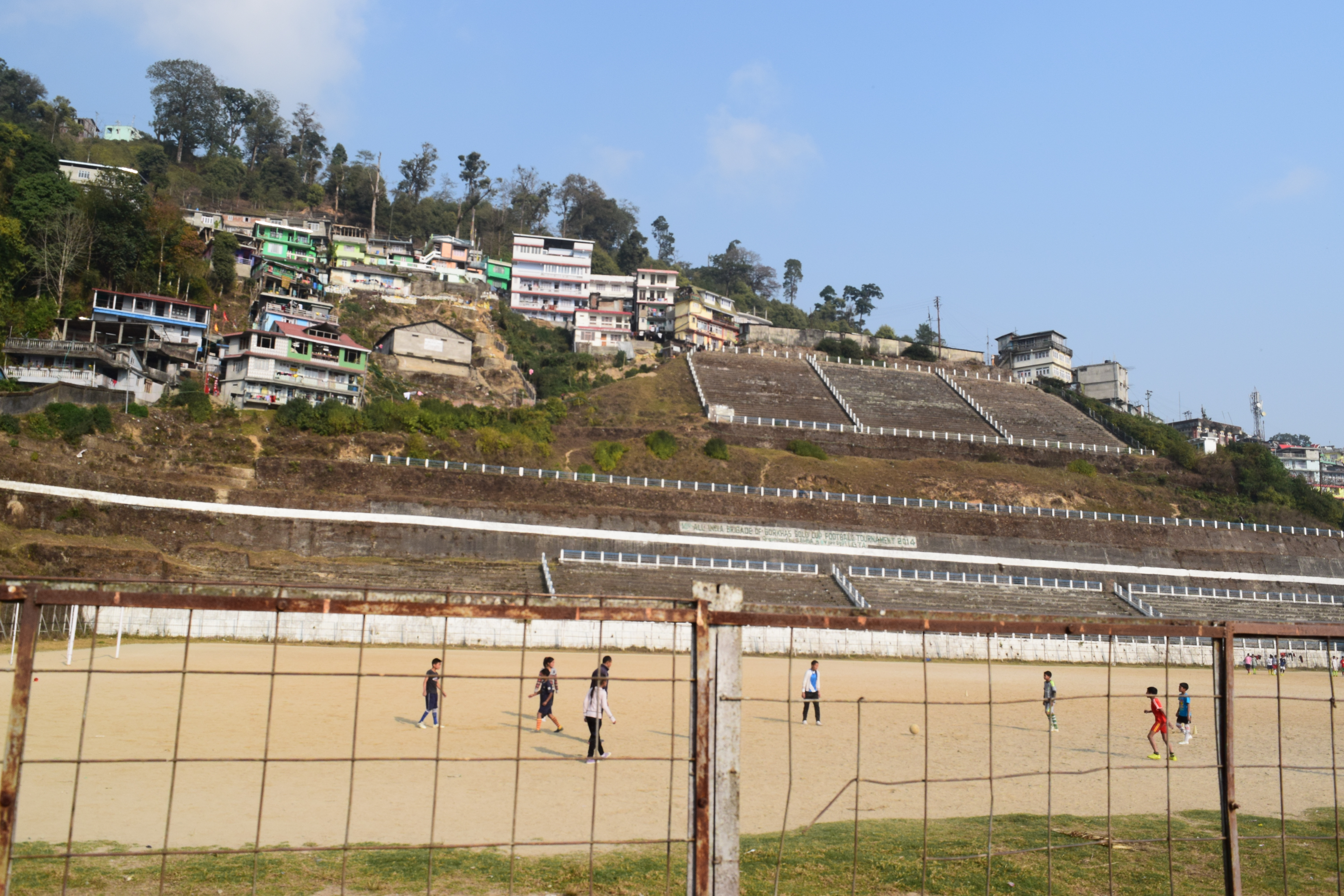
Gorkha stadium, Lebong

Horse racing is no longer held at the site. The area is currently under the control of the Indian Army and is used primarily as a helipad, although it continues to host occasional cultural and sporting events.

== Tea Gardens of Lebong ==
The Lebong Valley is historically significant as one of the earliest sites of tea cultivation in the Darjeeling region, with plantations established in the 1850s. The valley continues to host several prominent tea estates, and Golai Bazar functions as a local commercial centre for communities associated with these gardens.

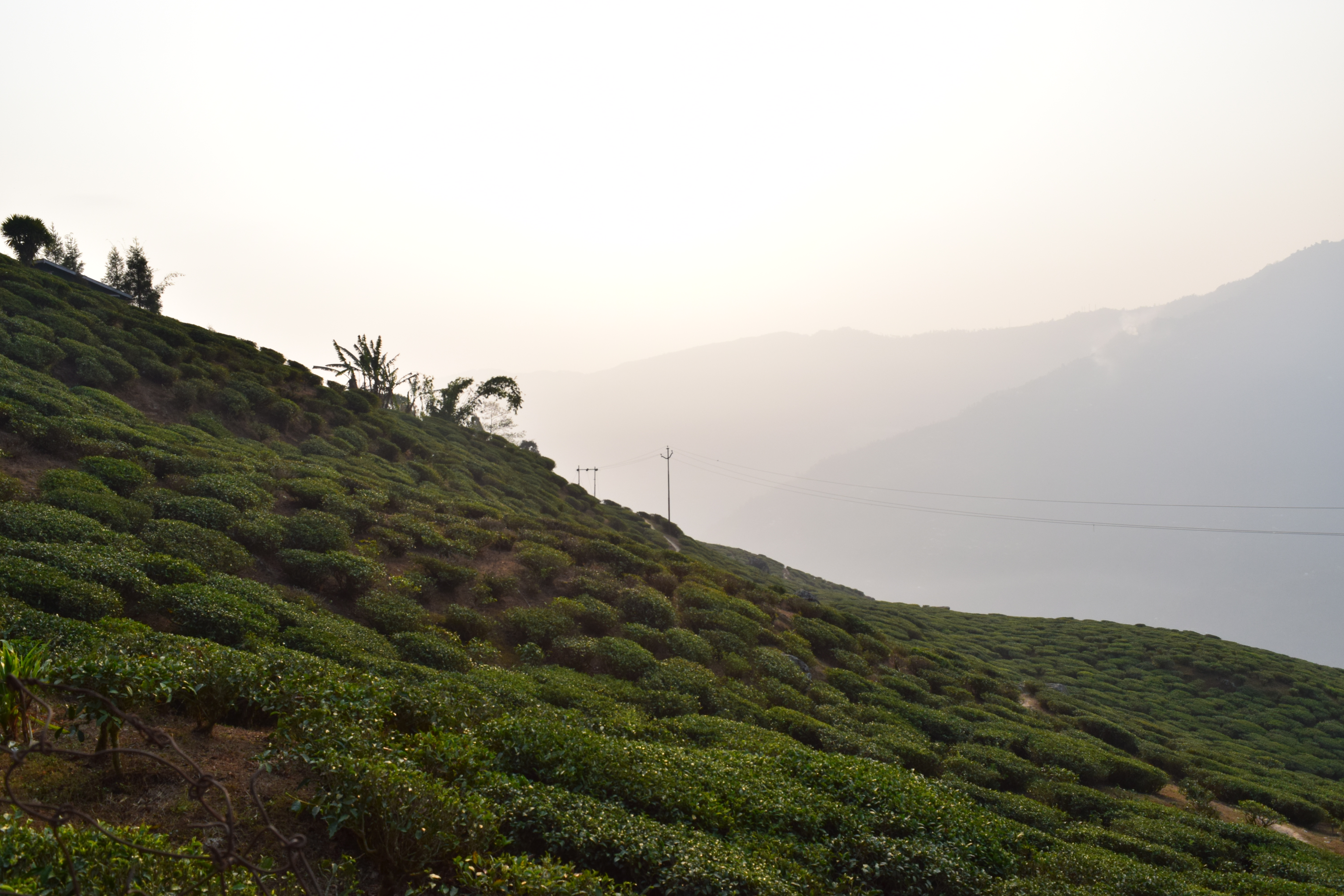
Pandam Tea Estate, Lebong

Among the earliest estates is Bannockburn Tea Estate, established in the mid-nineteenth century during the initial phase of tea plantation development in Darjeeling. The estate covers approximately 300 hectares, of which around 143 hectares are under cultivation, with an annual production of about 90,000 kilograms of tea. The name “Bannockburn” is said to have been inspired by the historic battlefield in Scotland, reflecting the origins of early European planters.

Ging Tea Estate, located within the Lebong Valley, was established in 1864 by the Darjeeling Tea Company. The estate spans roughly 250 hectares and is known for producing a range of teas, including black, green, and white varieties. The Ging Tea House, constructed during the colonial period, is among the earliest planter bungalows in the region.

Phoobsering Tea Estate, established between 1856 and 1860 by the Darjeeling Tea Company, is one of the oldest plantations in the Darjeeling hills. It covers an area of approximately 510 hectares and is noted for its production of oolong tea.

Badamtam Tea Estate, founded in 1861, is another historic plantation in the Lebong Valley. It is currently owned by the Goodricke Group and extends over approximately 172 hectares, situated at elevations ranging from 350 to 1,830 metres. The name “Badamtam” is generally believed to have derived from a local Lepcha term.
