= Thurbo Tea Estate =

Tea garden in West Bengal, India

- Interactive map of Thurbo Tea Estate
- Location: Darjeeling district, West Bengal, India
- Coordinates: 26.896444°N 88.171611°E
- Area: 485.11 ha (1,198.7 acres)
- Elevation: 980 to 2,440 metres (3,220 to 8,010 ft)
- Owner: Goodricke Group
- Open: 1872

Thurbo Tea Estate is a tea garden in the Mirik CD block in the Mirik subdivision of the Darjeeling district in the Indian state of West Bengal.

== Etymology ==
The name “Thurbo” is a variation of the Nepali word “Tombu” meaning tent. The British set up tents in this area when fighting the Nepalese in 1870.

== History ==
Thurbo, a Darjeeling tea garden, was planted in 1872. It is now owned by the Goodricke Group, which owns such gardens as Margaret's Hope, Castleton and Thurbo, “some of the most famous tea gardens in the world”.

== Geography ==
Places and tea estates in the southern portion of Darjeeling Sadar subdivision (including Jorebunglow Sukhiapokhri CD block), and Mirik Subdivision in Darjeeling district
CT: census town, R: rural/ urban centre, NP: national park/ wildlife sanctuary, TE: tea estate
Abbreviations used in names – TG for Tea Garden (town/village), TE for Tea Estate
Owing to space constraints in the small map, the actual locations in a larger map may vary slightly

Thurbo is located at an altitude varying from 980 to 2,440 metres (3,220 to 8,010 ft). The Mechi flows on its northern side and the Rangbag on its south. Thubro enjoys typical hill climate, where temperatures remain low with less sunshine.

Note: The map alongside presents some of the notable locations in the subdivision. All places marked in the map are linked in the larger full screen map.

== Economy ==
Thurbo teas carry rare fragrance and command premium prices.

=== The Goodricke Group ===
The Goodricke Group owns five tea estates in Darjeeling: Thurbo, Badamtam, Barnesbeg, Castleton and Margaret's Hope.
