= Castleton Tea Estate =

Tea garden in West Bengal, India

- Interactive map of Castleton Tea Estate
- Location: Darjeeling district, West Bengal, India
- Coordinates: 26.869478°N 88.277652°E
- Area: 170 hectares (420 acres)
- Elevation: 980 to 2,300 metres (3,220 to 7,550 ft)
- Owner: Goodricke Group
- Open: 1885

Castleton Tea Estate is a tea garden in the Kurseong CD block in the Kurseong subdivision of the Darjeeling district in the Indian state of West Bengal.

== History ==
The garden was planted by Dr. Charles Graham in 1885. The Goodricke Group took over the garden in 1984.

The tea estate was earlier named Kumseri. There was a building named “Bank Ghar’’, which had the look of a castle and from that building, the place became Castleton.

== Geography ==
Places and tea estates in the north-eastern portion of Darjeeling Sadar subdivision (including Rangli Rangliot CD block) and Kurseong subdivision in Darjeeling district
CT: census town, R: rural/ urban centre, N: neighbourhood, H: hill centre, NP: national park/ wildlife sanctuary, TE: tea estate, TA: tourist attraction
Abbreviations used in names – TG for Tea Garden (town/village), TE for Tea Estate
Owing to space constraints in the small map, the actual locations in a larger map may vary slightly

=== The garden ===
Castleton Tea Estate, with a planted area of 170 hectares (420 acres), is spread over the mountain slopes of Kurseong and Pankhabari, at an altitude of 980 to 2,300 metres (3,220 to 7,550 ft) above mean sea level.

Note: The map alongside presents some of the notable locations in the subdivision. All places marked in the map are linked in the larger full screen map.

== Economy ==
Castleton has been awarded the ISO9000/HACCP/ISO 22000 Quality Systems Certification.

Their products have received world record prices.

The main products of Castleton Tea Estate are black tea, green tea, white tea, Muscatel, and Moonlight. All picked from delicate Chinese bushes. The Darjeeling tea that is produced here has a rose-like fragrance and a Muscatel flavor.

=== The Goodricke Group ===
The Goodricke Group owns five tea estates in Darjeeling: Thurbo, Badamtam, Barnesbeg, Castleton and Margaret's Hope.
