= Garlang Stadium =

Football stadium in West Bengal, India

- Interactive map of Garlang Stadium
- Address: India
- Location: Rangli Rangliot, Darjeeling district, West Bengal
- Coordinates: 27°3′38.23″N 88°23′14.11″E
- Owner: Gorkhaland Territorial Administration
- Capacity: 15,000

Construction
- Opened: 2022
- Cost: ₹6 crores

Garlang Stadium (also known as Peshok Playground) is a multi-purpose stadium located in Rangli Rangliot under Darjeeling district, West Bengal, India. Announced in 2018, the Construction was started in 2020 and after completion it was inaugurated in 2023 by Anit Thapa, the chief executive of the GTA.

== Specifications ==
The stadium is spread over 5 Acres in the hills. The stadium soccer ground is of international standards and 105 metres long and 65 metres wide. The stadium can accommodate 15,000 spectators.
