= Margaret's Hope Tea Estate =

Tea garden in West Bengal, India

Margaret’s Hope Tea Estate
- Interactive map of Margaret’s Hope Tea Estate
- Location: Darjeeling district, West Bengal, India
- Coordinates: 26.923478°N 88.272652°E
- Area: 585 hectares (1,450 acres)
- Elevation: 950 to 1,830 metres (3,120 to 6,000 ft)
- Owner: Goodricke Group
- Open: 1864

Margaret's Hope Tea Estate is a tea garden in the Kurseong CD block in the Kurseong subdivision of the Darjeeling district in the Indian state of West Bengal.

== Etymology ==
The famous tea estate was named in honour of the daughter of a British officer. Margaret, who was the youngest daughter of the estate owner Mr. Cruickshank (alternately Bagdon, according to others) came from England for a visit. She liked the surrounding picturesque settings, and fell in love with the tranquil hilly environment so much that she promised to her father that she would come back to the place again. While returning to England, she tragically died on the ship due to tropical illness. Her father, grief-stricken by the news, changed the name of the estate from its original name, Ringtong to Margaret's Hope, in memory of his beloved daughter.

== History ==
Although the tea estate was set up in the 1830s, it became commercially viable in 1864. It was then known as Bara Ringtong. It was named Margaret's Hope Tea Estate in the 1920s. The present factory was built by John Taylor in 1930. The tea estate is now owned by the Goodricke Group.

== Geography ==
Places and tea estates in the north-eastern portion of Darjeeling Sadar subdivision (including Rangli Rangliot CD block) and Kurseong subdivision in Darjeeling district
CT: census town, R: rural/ urban centre, N: neighbourhood, H: hill centre, NP: national park/ wildlife sanctuary, TE: tea estate, TA: tourist attraction
Abbreviations used in names – TG for Tea Garden (town/village), TE for Tea Estate
Owing to space constraints in the small map, the actual locations in a larger map may vary slightly

=== Location ===
Margaret's Hope is in the Northern Valley of Kurseong, very close to the Longview Highlands. The area is popularly referred to as the Land of White Orchids.

The estate is spread over an area of 585 hectares (1,450 acres). The height varies from 950 to 1,830 metres (3,120 to 6,000 ft).

Two rivers flow through the estate and a romantic view of the Himalayas forms the backdrop. One can enjoy a view of the panorama from the Tea Deck.

Note: The map alongside presents some of the notable locations in the subdivision. All places marked in the map are linked in the larger full screen map.

== Economy ==
Darjeeling tea from the China tea bushes growing in the misty environment at heights ranging from 2,800 to 5,500 feet (850 to 1,680 m) has a loyal clientele globally.

=== The Goodricke Group ===
The Goodricke Group owns five tea estates in Darjeeling: Thurbo, Badamtam, Barnesbeg, Castleton and Margaret's Hope.

== Historic labour movement ==
Margaret's Hope is considered to be the birthplace of organised labour movement in West Bengal's tea industry. In 1955, a strike, called by Communist Party of India and Akhil Bharatiya Gorkha League, was underway. On 25 June, hundreds of workers had gathered at Margaret's Hope Tea Estate, to register their protest against low wages and denial of facilities by tea garden managements. Six protesters, including two women, were killed in police firing. The furore spilled over and the next day 20,000 workers and common people laid siege of the district headquarters. By 27 June, the management met all the demands of the workers. To take just one example, for the first-time tea garden workers were paid bonus. Although there was provision for payment of bonus under the Bonus Act, till then no tea garden had implemented it. Wages were also raised.
