= North Bengal Tea Industry =

Industry in West Bengal

The North Bengal Tea Industry production areas are in the North Bengal region of West Bengal state, in Eastern India. It includes tea estates and facilities in the districts of Darjeeling, Jalpaiguri, Cooch Behar, Kishanganj and North Dinajpur in West Bengal.

North Bengal has about 450 tea gardens spread out in the Darjeeling Hills, Terai, and Dooars regions that are registered as sellers in the Siliguri Tea Auction Centre. The youngest tea gardens are Chinchula Tea Estate, Raimatang Tea Estate and Kalchini Tea Estate all of which are 72 years old. The largest tea garden is Samsing Tea Estate of 1256.60 hectares. Most of the tea gardens in the Dooars region are members of the Dooars Branch of the Indian Tea Association (DBITA), while those in the Terai region are members of the Terai Branch of the Indian Tea Association.

== History ==
Tea cultivation in the North Bengal began about 120 to 150 years ago in Dooars region, during the colonial British Raj period.

In the year 1840 tea was planted in Darjeeling district and adjacent areas in North Bengal. Which now reached to a 199 million tea industry.

== Small tea growers ==
Small tea growers are largely concentrated in North Dinajpur, Kishanganj, Jalpaiguri, Cooch Behar, and at the foothills of the Darjeeling Hills.

There are 30,000 such small tea growers in North Bengal and total production is around 91 million kg, which is almost 32.5% of North Bengal's tea production of 280 million kg.

Bought-leaf factories are units that buy these tea leaves and convert them into the processed tea. Generally, 6000 tea bushes can be planted in an acre of plot. These 6,000 bushes can produce 10,000 kg of green leaf. The cost of production varies between Rs 8.50 - Rs 10.50 per kg.

== Tea production in North Bengal ==
Region	January to December Year 2014	January to December Year 2015	January Up-To June Year 2016
Darjeeling	7.9 / 7.8 Mkg	0.9 / 0.8 Mkg	8.8 / 8.6 Mkg
Dooars	116.6 / 111.5 Mkg	19.1 / 18.2 Mkg	135.7 / 129.7 Mkg
Terai	63.3 / 68.7 Mkg	13.8 / 12.3 Mkg	77.1 / 81.0 Mkg
Total	187.8 / 188.00 Mkg	33.8 / 31.3 Mkg	221.6 / 219.3 Mkg

== Siliguri Tea Auction Centre ==
Siliguri Tea Auction Centre was established in the year 1976 for the better marketing facility of the local tea products. This tea auction centre has immensely reduced the travel time of tea growers of North Bengal to market the end product at this centre either wise this tea growers had to market them at Guwahati Tea Auction centre which is about 500 km from Siliguri.

== See also ==
- Darjeeling tea
- Tea Board of India
- Indian Tea Association
- Assam Tea
- Rangamati Tea Estate Cemetery

== Incidents ==
- "Cold weather clouds tea crop prospects in Assam, Bengal". The Hindu.
- "Tea output declines 4% to 129.68 million kg in Oct". Money Control.
