= Teesta Valley Tea Garden =

- Village
- Location in West Bengal, India Teesta Valley Tea Garden (India)
- Coordinates: 27.015436°N 88.403667°E
- Country: India
- State: West Bengal
- District: Darjeeling

Population (2011)
  - Total: 6,064
- Time zone: UTC+5:30 (IST)
- PIN: 734226
- Lok Sabha constituency: Darjeeling
- Vidhan Sabha constituency: Kurseong
- Website: darjeeling.gov.in

Teesta Valley Tea Garden is a village in the Rangli Rangliot CD block in the Darjeeling Sadar subdivision of the Darjeeling district in the state of West Bengal, India.

== Geography ==
Places and tea estates in the north-eastern portion of Darjeeling Sadar subdivision (including Rangli Rangliot CD block) and Kurseong subdivision in Darjeeling district
CT: census town, R: rural/ urban centre, N: neighbourhood, H: hill centre, NP: national park/ wildlife sanctuary, TE: tea estate, TA: tourist attraction
Abbreviations used in names – TG for Tea Garden (town/village), TE for Tea Estate
Owing to space constraints in the small map, the actual locations in a larger map may vary slightly

=== Location ===
Teesta Valley Tea Garden is located at 27.015436°N 88.403667°E.

There is a view point, Durpin Dnara, in the tea garden, from where one gets a grand view of the Teesta right up to Sevoke.

=== Area overview ===
The map alongside shows the eastern portion of the Darjeeling Himalayan hill region and a small portion of the terai region in its eastern and southern fringes, all of it in the Darjeeling district. In the Darjeeling Sadar subdivision 61.00% of the total population lives in the rural areas and 39.00% of the population lives in the urban areas. In the Kurseong subdivision 58.41% of the total population lives in the rural areas and 41.59% lives in the urban areas. There are 78 tea gardens/ estates (the figure varies slightly according to different sources), in the district, producing and largely exporting Darjeeling tea. It engages a large proportion of the population directly and indirectly. Some tea gardens were identified in the 2011 census as census towns or villages. Such places are marked in the map as CT (census town) or R (rural/urban centre). Specific tea estate pages are marked TE.

Note: The map alongside presents some of the notable locations in the subdivision. All places marked in the map are linked in the larger full screen map.

== Demographics ==
According to the 2011 Census of India, Teesta Valley Tea Garden had a total population of 6,064 of which 3,004 (50%) were males and 3,060 (50%) were females. There were 591 persons in the age range of 0 to 6 years. The total number of literate people in Teesta Valley Tea Garden was 4,275 (70.50% of the population over 6 years).

== Economy ==
Teesta Valley Tea Garden is 10 km from Takdah. It was established in 1841 and is now owned by Bharat Bajaria. It produces Darjeeling tea, which is exported to Japan, Europe and other places.
