= Darjeeling Hill Institute of Technology and Management =

Engineering college in Takdah, Darjeeling

- Type: Engineering college
- Established: 27 August 2025; 9 months ago
- Affiliations: Maulana Abul Kalam Azad University of Technology
- Principal: Prof. Dr. Mithun Chakraborty
- Location: Takdah, Darjeeling, West Bengal, 734222, India; 27.0374689°N 88.3603361°E
- Campus: Urban
- Approvals: AICTE
- Website: dhitm.co.in

Darjeeling Hill Institute of Technology and Management (DHITM), is a Public-Private Partnership (PPP) Model engineering college in Takdah, Darjeeling district, West Bengal, India.

== About College ==
This is first engineering college in West Bengal set up in Public-Private Partnership (PPP) mode, offers Bachelor of Technology courses which are affiliated to Maulana Abul Kalam Azad University of Technology. Its established by Gorkhaland Territorial Administration (GTA), managed by Orissa Child Welfare & Education Trust (OCWET) and funded by NHPC.

== Academics ==
This college offers Bachelor of Technology in Computer Science & Engineering, Civil Engineering, Artificial Intelligence & Machine Learning, Electrical Engineering, and Mechanical Engineering. Its also offers Bachelor of Hotel Management & Catering Technology

== See also ==
- List of institutions of higher education in West Bengal
- Education in India
- Education in West Bengal
