= Glenburn Tea Estate =

Tea garden in West Bengal, India

- Interactive map of Glenburn Tea Estate
- Location: Darjeeling district, West Bengal, India
- Coordinates: 27.083533°N 88.336237°E
- Area: 750 ha (1,900 acres)
- Elevation: 1,000 to 3,000 feet (300 to 910 m)
- Owner: Prakash family
- Open: 1859

Glenburn Tea Estate is a tea garden in the Rangli Rangliot CD block in the Darjeeling Sadar subdivision of the Darjeeling district in the Indian state of West Bengal.

== History ==
Established in 1859 by a Scottish tea company, Glenburn Tea Estate has been run by the Kolkata-based Prakash family for four generations. When East India Company's monopoly of the Chinese tea trade came to an end in the early 19th century, one of the first places they thought of for developing tea gardens was the Doon Valley in the foothills of the Himalayas. It also happened to be the ancestral home of the Prakash family. Lala Darshan Lal, the patriarch of the family, started as a small tea planter and grew to be tea magnate owning tea gardens across the country. Anand Prakash, Sudhir Prakash and Ansuman Prakash followed in his footsteps.

From garden to cup
A pound of tea is produced from about a thousand tender shoots. Fresh tea leaves contain over 75% moisture and this moisture is removed, in a process called withering, by blowing air through the leaves. The next step, the rolling process, once done by hand, is now done by machines. In this process the cells are ruptured before fermentation, a process of oxidation. In the fermentation process tea acquires “flavour, strength and health giving properties”. Finally, the tea is dried by passing hot air through the leaves.

Locals call the garden Kimble and according to local legend, Kimble Murray, the first manager of the estate, still roams around the garden slopes, looking for a perfect cup of tea.

== Geography ==
Places and tea estates in the north-eastern portion of Darjeeling Sadar subdivision (including Rangli Rangliot CD block) and Kurseong subdivision in Darjeeling district
CT: census town, R: rural/ urban centre, N: neighbourhood, H: hill centre, NP: national park/ wildlife sanctuary, TE: tea estate, TA: tourist attraction
Abbreviations used in names – TG for Tea Garden (town/village), TE for Tea Estate
Owing to space constraints in the small map, the actual locations in a larger map may vary slightly

== Glenburn tea ==
In Glenburn Tea Estate, there is a reserve forest (known as Simbong Forest) of 350 ha (860 acres) within the total area of 750 ha (1,900 acres). The Rangeet and the Rungdung flow through/ near the tea estate. The elevation of the tea estate varies from 1,000 to 3,000 feet (300 to 910 m).

Glenburn produces some of the finest Darjeeling tea. It specialises in Black tea, but also produces other varieties.

Note: The map alongside presents some of the notable locations in the subdivision. All places marked in the map are linked in the larger full screen map.

== Tea tourism ==
Tourists visiting Glenburn Tea Estate can stay in bungalows – the Burra Bungalow and Water Lily Bungalow. The first is the original planters bungalow, a heritage property restored to its old charm in 2001. The second one was added in 2008.
