= Luxmi Estates =

Indian tea estate holding company

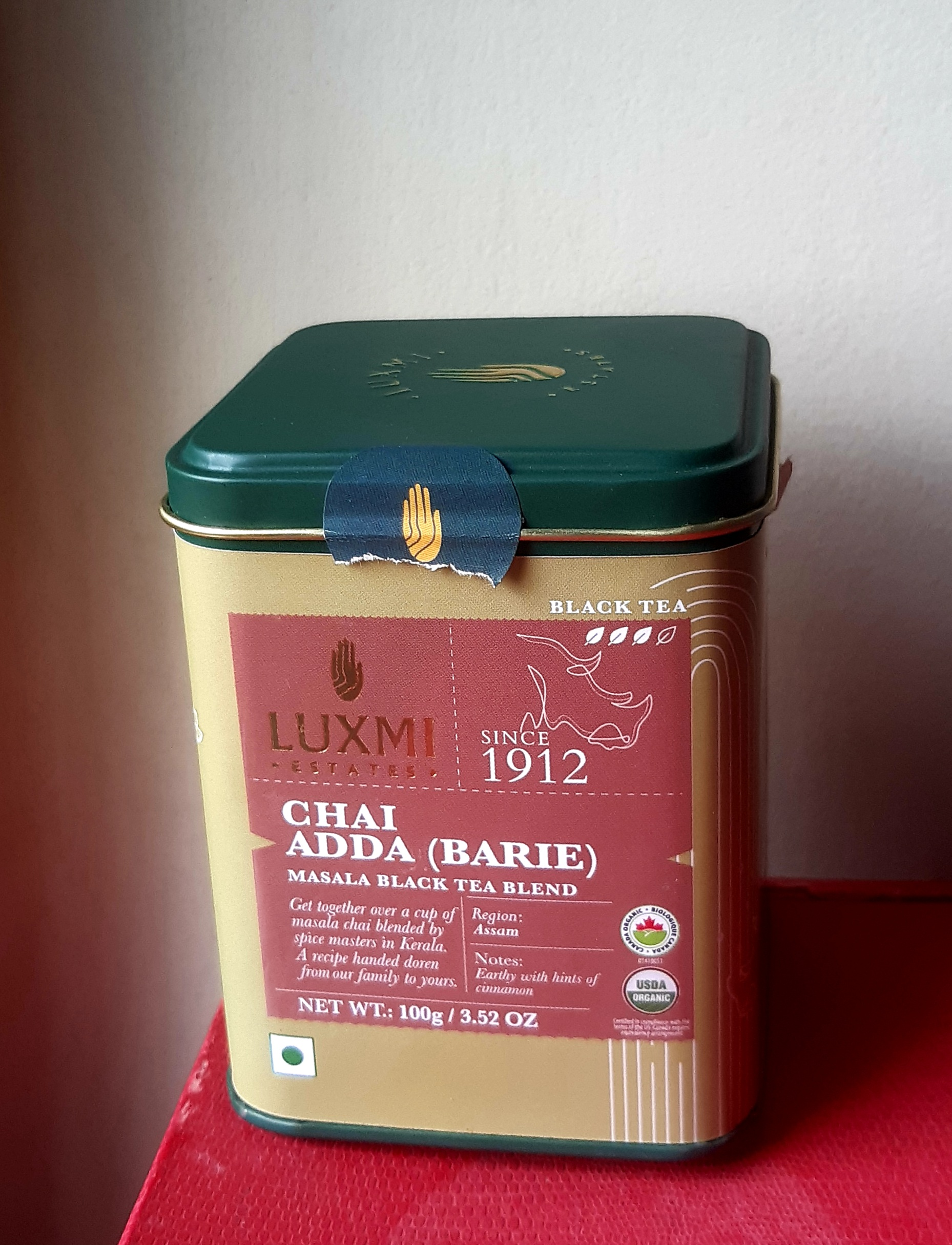
- A tea box by Luxmi Estates
- Company type: Private
- Industry: Food
- Founded: 1912; 114 years ago
- Founder: P. C. Chatterjee
- Headquarters: Kolkata, India
- Products: Tea
- Website: www.luxmiestates.in

Luxmi Estates (also known as Luxmi Group or Luxmi Tea) is an Indian company that primarily sells tea. It was founded by P. C. Chatterjee as an act of defiance against the British Raj in 1912 on a tract of land he owned in the Unakoti region of Tripura.

The group owns and operates 25 tea estates in northeast India, including the Makaibari Tea Estate, and Rwanda. In 2025, it signed an MoU with the Assam government to promote tea tourism.
