= Rangli Rangliot =

- Village
- Location in West Bengal, India Rangli Rangliot (India)
- Coordinates: 27.02748°N 88.35592°E
- Country: India
- State: West Bengal
- District: Drjeeling

Population (2011)
  - Total: 2,616
- Time zone: UTC+5:30 (IST)
- PIN: 734226
- Lok Sabha constituency: Darjeeling
- Vidhan Sabha constituency: Kurseong
- Website: darjeeling.gov.in

Rangli Rangliot is a village in the Rangli Rangliot CD block in the Darjeeling Sadar subdivision of the Darjeeling district in the state of West Bengal, India.

== Geography ==
Places and tea estates in the north-eastern portion of Darjeeling Sadar subdivision (including Rangli Rangliot CD block) and Kurseong subdivision in Darjeeling district
CT: census town, R: rural/ urban centre, N: neighbourhood, H: hill centre, NP: national park/ wildlife sanctuary, TE: tea estate, TA: tourist attraction
Abbreviations used in names – TG for Tea Garden (town/village), TE for Tea Estate
Owing to space constraints in the small map, the actual locations in a larger map may vary slightly

=== Location ===
Rangli Rangliot is located at 27.02748°N 88.35592°E.

=== Area overview ===
The map alongside shows the eastern portion of the Darjeeling Himalayan hill region and a small portion of the terai region in its eastern and southern fringes, all of it in the Darjeeling district. In the Darjeeling Sadar subdivision 61.00% of the total population lives in the rural areas and 39.00% of the population lives in the urban areas. In the Kurseong subdivision 58.41% of the total population lives in the rural areas and 41.59% lives in the urban areas. There are 78 tea gardens/ estates (the figure varies slightly according to different sources), in the district, producing and largely exporting Darjeeling tea. It engages a large proportion of the population directly/ indirectly. Some tea gardens were identified in the 2011 census as census towns or villages. Such places are marked in the map as CT (census town) or R (rural/ urban centre). Specific tea estate pages are marked TE.

Note: The map alongside presents some of the notable locations in the subdivision. All places marked in the map are linked in the larger full screen map.

== Demographics ==
According to the 2011 Census of India, Rangli Rangliot Tea Garden had a total population of 2,616 of which 1,230 (47%) were males and 1,386 (53%) were females. There were 181 persons in the age range of 0 to 6 years. The total number of literate people in Rangli Rangliot was 1,969 (75.27% of the population over 6 years).

== Civic Administration ==
=== Police station ===
Rangli Rangliot police station has jurisdiction over the Rangli Rangliot CD block.

== Economy ==
Rangli Rangliot Tea Garden of Duncan Industries Limited was awarded ISO:9002 certification from Det Norske Veritas.

As of 2020, Rangli Rangliot Tea Garden has been facing numerous problems for the past two years or so.

== Education ==
Jinglam Uday Higher Secondary School is an English-medium coeducational institution established in 1968. It has facilities for teaching from class V to class XII.

== Healthcare ==
Takdah Rural Hospital, with 30 beds at Takdah, is the major government medical facility in the Rangli Rangliot CD block.
