= Muscatel (tea) =

Tea flavor

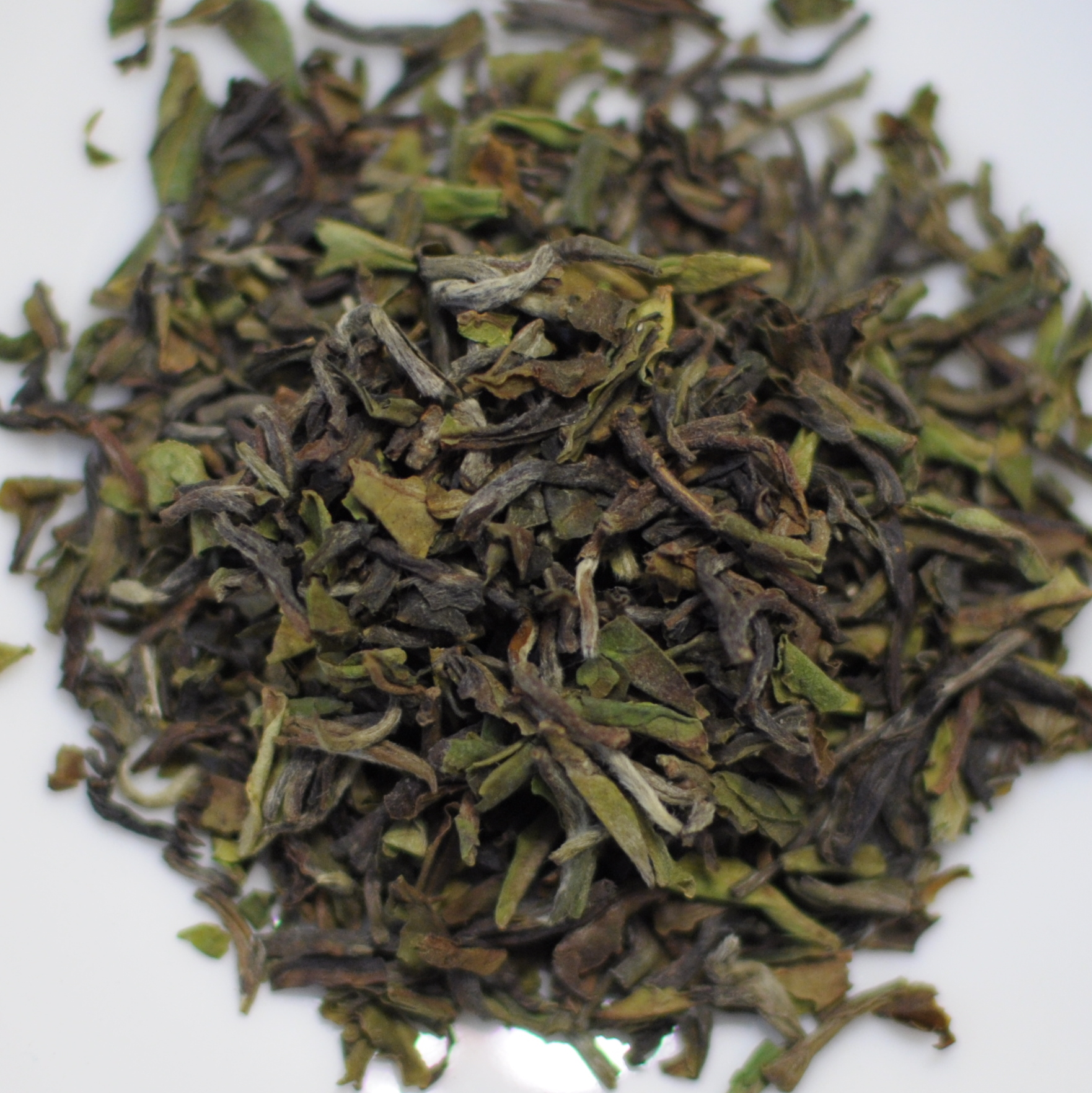
Darjeeling tea described as possessing the muscatel flavor

Muscatel refers to a distinctive flavor found in some Darjeeling teas, especially the second-flush teas. It has been described as a "distinct sweet flavour" that is not present in other flushes or tea from other localities, and has a sweet complex flavor note to it. Also a "musky spiciness," "a unique muscat-like fruitiness in aroma and flavour," or "dried raisins with a hay like finish." Though difficult to describe, it is prized by tea aficionados.

The flavor develops in part through the action of sap-sucking insects, jassids and thrips, which partly damage the young tea leaves. The tea plant then produces terpenes as an insect repellent. This higher concentration of terpene produces the muscatel flavor.
