= Makaibari Tea Estate =

Tea garden in West Bengal, India

- Interactive map of Makaibari Tea Estate
- Location: Darjeeling district, West Bengal, India
- Coordinates: 26.855478°N 88.267652°E
- Area: 120 ha (300 acres)
- Elevation: 600–1,500 m (2,000–4,900 ft)
- Owner: Luxmi Group
- Open: 1859

Makaibari Tea Estate is a tea garden in the Kurseong CD block in the Kurseong subdivision of the Darjeeling district in the Indian state of West Bengal.

== Etymology ==
Makaibari literally means 'corn field'.

== History ==
Makaibari Tea Estate, founded in 1852, by Captain Samler, an Agent of the Darjeeling Tea Company. Samler sold the plantation to Girish Chandra Banerjee, who ran a commissary and mail services in Kurseong. It is one of the oldest tea gardens in Darjeeling. The tea factory at Makaibari was the first in Darjeeling district, commissioned in 1859 and closed in 1933. It is one of the few tea gardens in Darjeeling owned by an Indian family. Except for a brief ownership under Captain Samler, the garden has been with the Banerjees throughout. (Bipra Das Palchoudhuri's Gayabari, Tindharia and Mohurgang Tea Estates and Kamal Halder's Kamalpur Tea Estate have been with the family ever since the beginning and unlike other Darjeeling tea gardens it had no British connections.) Since the 1970s, Makaibari was led by the fourth generation planter and researcher, Swaraj Kumar Banerjee.

The Luxmi Group acquired Makaibari Tea Estate in 2014. However, Swaraj Kumar Banerjee continued to be chairman of the company till 2017. The Luxmi group owns 25 tea estates in Assam, Darjeeling, Rwanda and North Bengal. Dipankar Chatterjee, the company chairman, has been a planter for over 40 years.

In 2017, Swaraj Kumar Banerjee finally left Makaibari handing over reigns of the tea estate to Rudra Chatterjee, 30 years his junior.

In 2018, Swaraj Kumar Banerjee announced that he will gift his 12% shares in the Makaibari Tea and Trading Company, which he retained after he sold majority of his stake to the Kolkata-based Luxmi Group, to the workers.

== Coordinates ==
Places and tea estates in the north-eastern portion of Darjeeling Sadar subdivision (including Rangli Rangliot CD block) and Kurseong subdivision in Darjeeling district
CT: census town, R: rural/ urban centre, N: neighbourhood, H: hill centre, NP: national park/ wildlife sanctuary, TE: tea estate, TA: tourist attraction
Abbreviations used in names – TG for Tea Garden (town/village), TE for Tea Estate
Owing to space constraints in the small map, the actual locations in a larger map may vary slightly

=== The garden ===
Located at an altitude of 1,500 m (4,900 ft) above sea level, the estate covers six ridges. Tea plantation takes place over 120 ha (300 acres) out of a total of 670 ha (1,700 acres). The balance area is left for forestry development.

Three rivers flow through the tea estate and join the Balason.

Makaibari Tea Estate has sustained the residents of seven villages: Kodobari, Fulbari, Koilapni, Cheptey, Makaibari, Thapathali and Chungey.

Note: The map alongside presents some of the notable locations in the subdivision. All places marked in the map are linked in the larger full screen map.

== Achievements ==
Makaibari was the first garden to be certified for trade in the world. It was one of the first few to be awarded fair trade certifications. In 1988 it was the first garden to be awarded/ certified as the fully organic tea garden.

Makaibari produces around 100,000 kg tea annually. Darjeeling Tea commands an average price ranging from Rs. 970–1,050 per kg. Makaibari tea fetches around Rs. 3,000 per kg. In 2017, a special pack of 5 kg of first flush handcrafted Darjeeling tea from Makaibari fetched the highest ever price for any first flush tea at $302 (Rs. 21,746) per kg. While tea connoisseurs in Europe prefer first flush tea, those in UK and Japan prefer second flush tea. In 2014 a special lot of handcrafted second flush tea from Makaibari fetched $1,850 (Rs. 1.57 lakh) per kg. That was the most expensive Indian tea ever sold.

== Tea tourism ==
Makaibari has organised 'home stay' arrangements in the villages around the tea estate. Comfortable accommodation and food are provided. Additionally, the tourists (foreigners and Indians) not only get to be acquainted with the tea garden, but also with the lifestyle of the villagers. The 'home stay' programmes started by the management "where Gorkha tea workers host visitors in chalets attached to their own homes", provide extra income for the workers.

== Socio-cultural amenities ==
Makaibari Tea Estate employs around 700 workers and 45 staff. All workers working in the garden have permanent work status. The company does not engage casual labourers for garden or factory activity.

Foodgrains, umbrellas and shoes are given to the workers free of cost. The management has established primary schools. There is a club, a computer centre and community halls with television sets. A library has also been opened for children of garden workers. There is a garden hospital and a visiting doctor. Workers and their families are entitled to free treatment in the garden hospital.
