= Takdah =

- Hill Town
- Location in West Bengal, India Takdah (India)
- Coordinates: 27°02′N 88°22′E
- Country India: India
- State: West Bengal
- District: Darjeeling

Languages
  - Official: Nepali, English
- Time zone: UTC+5:30 (IST)
- PIN: 734222
- Nearest city: Darjeeling

Takdah Cantonment is a neighbourhood in the Rangli Rangliot CD block in the Darjeeling Sadar subdivision of the Darjeeling district, West Bengal, India. It is one of the upcoming tourist centres of the Darjeeling hills. Takdah literary means "always covered" in one of the local folklores, as it is often covered in fog. Roads that connect Takdah are in very bad condition.

== History ==
Takdah Cantonment, as the name signifies, was a British cantonment before the independence of India. It was the destination for many British officers of high rank from all over India. After independence, like many other towns and villages, Takdah was abandoned by the new order. It was only recently that people really started to settle down in the area. Though the Britishers are long gone, we can still find the beautiful structures erected during the British era. The marvel of Takdah lies in the old, abandoned club house which is just a km away from the town. In comparison to its surrounding, the town is on a higher altitude giving way to cedar trees and is much colder than the towns surrounding it.

== Present ==
Takdah Cantonment has an orchid center where a variety of rare Himalayan orchids are cultivated. This center has been the favourite of tourists visiting Takdah. The nearest tea gardens are Rungli, Giele and Teesta Valley tea gardens. The main junction of Takdah is called Dara Dokan. The town of Darjeeling is 30 km away and Takdah is connected with Darjeeling with buses and jeeps. A number of educational institutions are set up. In Takdah bazar, there is one co-residential English medium school campus which follows the ICSE syllabus.

== Geography ==
Places and tea estates in the north-eastern portion of Darjeeling Sadar subdivision (including Rangli Rangliot CD block) and Kurseong subdivision in Darjeeling district
CT: census town, R: rural/ urban centre, N: neighbourhood, H: hill centre, NP: national park/ wildlife sanctuary, TE: tea estate, TA: tourist attraction
Abbreviations used in names – TG for Tea Garden (town/village), TE for Tea Estate
Owing to space constraints in the small map, the actual locations in a larger map may vary slightly

=== Location ===
Takdah is shown as being located in Manedara mouza in the map of Rangli Rangliot CD block on page 145 of District Census Handbook, Darjeeling.

=== Area overview ===
The map alongside shows the eastern portion of the Darjeeling Himalayan hill region and a small portion of the terai region in its eastern and southern fringes, all of it in the Darjeeling district. In the Darjeeling Sadar subdivision 61.00% of the total population lives in the rural areas and 39.00% of the population lives in the urban areas. In the Kurseong subdivision 58.41% of the total population lives in the rural areas and 41.59% lives in the urban areas. There are 78 tea gardens/ estates (the figure varies slightly according to different sources), in the district, producing and largely exporting Darjeeling tea. It engages a large proportion of the population directly/ indirectly. Some tea gardens were identified in the 2011 census as census towns or villages. Such places are marked in the map as CT (census town) or R (rural/ urban centre). Specific tea estate pages are marked TE.

Note: The map alongside presents some of the notable locations in the subdivision. All places marked in the map are linked in the larger full screen map.

== Civic administration ==
=== CD block HQ ===
Headquarters of Rangli Rangliot CD block is at Takdah.

== Education ==
Griffith’s Higher Secondary School is an English-medium coeducational institution established in 1936. It has facilities for teaching from class V to class XII.

- Darjeeling Hill Institute of Technology and Management

== Healthcare ==
Takdah Rural Hospital, with 30 beds at Takdah, is the major government medical facility in the Rangli Rangliot CD block.
