= Badamtam Tea Estate =

Tea garden in West Bengal, India

- Interactive map of Badamtam Tea Estate
- Location: Darjeeling district, West Bengal, India
- Coordinates: 27.0944°N 88.2997°E
- Elevation: 305 to 1,830 metres (1,001 to 6,004 ft)
- Owner: Goodricke Group Limited
- Open: 1858

Badamtam Tea Estate is a tea garden in the Darjeeling Pulbazar CD block in the Darjeeling Sadar subdivision of the Darjeeling district in West Bengal, India.

== History ==
Badamtam Tea Estate was planted by Christine Barnes in the year 1858 before commercialization by the Lebong Company. The name of the estate could have been derived from a Lepcha word, which means bamboo water carrier.

== Geography ==
Places and tea estates in the north-western portion of Darjeeling Sadar subdivision (including Darjeeling Pulbazar CD block) in Darjeeling district
CT: census town, R: rural/ urban centre, N: neighbourhood, H: hill centre, NP: national park/ wildlife sanctuary, TE: tea estate, TA: tourist attraction
Abbreviations used in names – TG for Tea Garden (town/village), TE for Tea Estate
Owing to space constraints in the small map, the actual locations in a larger map may vary slightly

=== Location ===
Badamtam Tea Estate is located in the Lebong Valley about 17 kilometers west of the Darjeeling town. After the end of the two estates viz., Bada Ging Tea Estate and Chhota Ging Tea Estate, starts the area of Badamtam tea estate and goes till the Majhi Tar basin in Sikkim.

The estate is situated at an altitude ranging between 305 metres to 1830 metres above sea level.

Note: The map alongside presents some of the notable locations in the subdivision. All places marked in the map are linked in the larger full screen map.

== Tea ==
Badamtam Tea Estate is famed for its Darjeeling First Flush Teas and other flushes.

== Ownership ==
The estate is now owned by Goodricke Group Limited.

=== The Goodricke Group ===
The Goodricke Group owns five tea estates in Darjeeling: Thurbo, Badamtam, Barnesbeg, Castleton and Margaret's Hope.
