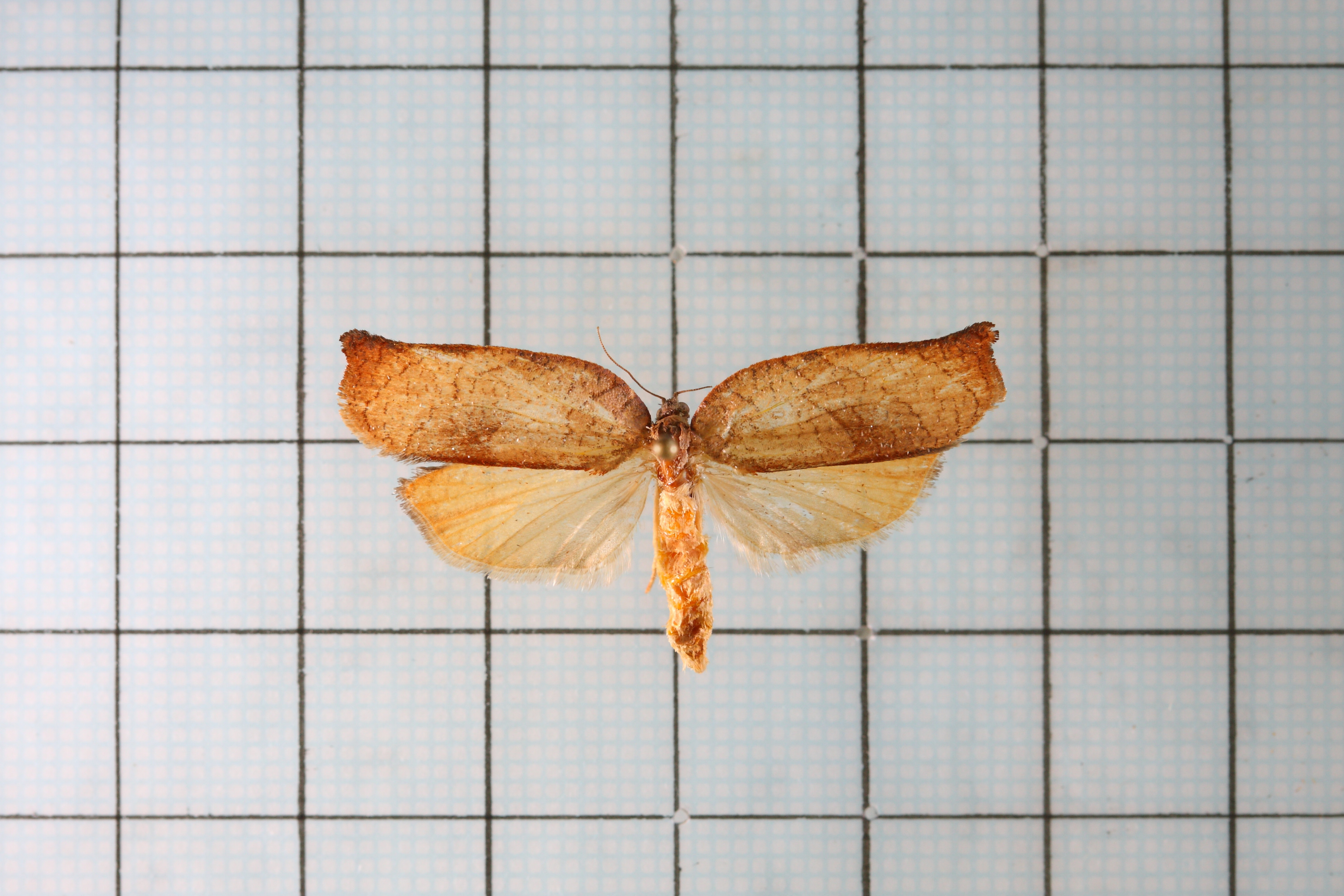

Scientific classification
- Kingdom: Animalia
- Phylum: Arthropoda
- Clade: Pancrustacea
- Class: Insecta
- Order: Lepidoptera
- Family: Tortricidae
- Genus: Homona
- Species: H. coffearia

Binomial name
- Homona coffearia (Nietner, 1861)

Synonyms
- Tortrix coffearia Nietner, 1861; Homona euryptera Diakonoff, 1941; Homona fasciculana Walker, 1863; Tortrix fimbriana Walker, 1869; Pandemis menciana Walker, 1863; Godana nubiferana Walker, 1866; Homona picrostacta Meyrick, 1921; Godana simulana Walker, 1866; Homona socialis Meyrick, 1912; Homona stenoptera Diakonoff, 1941

= Homona coffearia =

Species of moth

Homona coffearia, the tea tortrix or camellia tortrix, is a moth of the family Tortricidae. The species was first described by Nietner in 1861. It is widely distributed in the Oriental region.

== Description ==
The wingspan is 16–20 mm for males and about 23 mm for females. Adults are on wing between December and April in Sri Lanka. There are two generations per year in China with adults appearing in late May.

== Ecology ==
The larvae feed on Acacia auriculiformis, Arachis hypogaea, Bauhinia, Cajanus indicus, Calophyllum inophyllum, Camellia sinensis, Cinnamomum, Citrus, Coffea, Crotalaria, Derris, Eucalyptus alba, Eugenia polyantha, Glochidion, Gossypium, Linum, Melochia indica, Nephelium, Pluchea indica and Pyrus.

== Life cycle ==
The tea tortrix has a life cycle which takes about 35 to 49 days to complete. Immediately after copulation, adult females lay 100 to 150 clusters of egg on the surface of the leaves of host plant. Eggs are scaly and minute with overlapping appearance. After 6 to 8 days of laying, larvae hatch from the eggs. Larvae complete five instars and become fully grown after 3 to 4 weeks. Fully grown caterpillar is about 22 mm in length. Pupation occurs in the folds of the leaves. After 6–8 days of pupal life, adult emerges.

== Control ==
Adults can be mechanically removed by hand and light traps. Parasite Macrocentrus homonae used successfully in tea estates of Sri Lanka and India. In Sri Lanka, egg parasitoid Trichogramma erosicornis was used but results were not encouraging. New Guinea effectively used Theronia simillima and Camptotypus clotho to control the caterpillars and adults. Several chemical pesticides such as aminocarb, fenitrothion and formothion are effective, but they also destroy natural enemies of the moth.

== Distribution ==
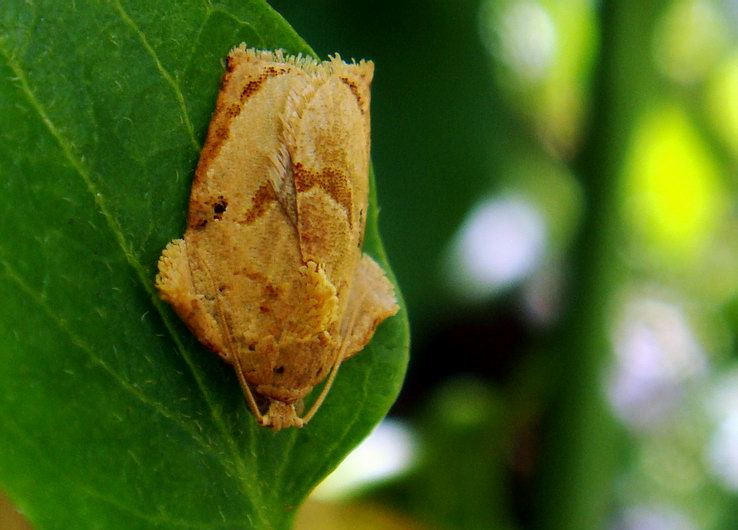
Homona coffearia in Chalakudy, India

Homona coffearia is found in Asia and on two occasions has been found in Great Britain. In Sussex. three Camellia plants imported from Japan, during the winter of 1964, produced three moths which emerged in April. There are also two records of the moth from Torpoint in Cornwall.
