= Rangli Rangliot (community development block) =

- Community development block
- Coordinates: 27°01′38″N 88°21′22″E
- Country: India
- State: West Bengal
- District: Darjeeling

Government
  - Type: Community development block

Area
  - Total: 272.99 km^{2} (105.40 sq mi)

Population (2011)
  - Total: 70,125
  - Density: 256.88/km^{2} (665.31/sq mi)
- Time zone: UTC+5:30 (IST)
- Lok Sabha constituency: Darjeeling
- Vidhan Sabha constituency: Kurseong
- Website: darjeeling.gov.in

Rangli Rangliot is a community development block (CD block) that forms an administrative division in the Darjeeling Sadar subdivision of the Darjeeling district in the Indian state of West Bengal.

== Geography ==
Rangli Rangliot is located at 27°01′46″N 88°21′25″E.

The snow-clad mountain ranges, a little to the north of the old Darjeeling district, form the main Himalayan range. Ranges/ ridges branching out from the main Himalayas pass through Darjeeling district. To the north-west towers the giant Kangchenjunga 28,146 ft (8,579 m) and to the north-east is Dongkya 23,184 ft (7,066 m). From Kangchenjunga the Singalila Ridge slopes down southward forming the border between India and Nepal. Manebhanjyang, Sandakphu and Phalut are popular trekking destinations on this ridge. It continues south and south-east through Tunglu and Senchal and other spurs that form the Darjeeling Hills west of the Teesta. To the east of the Teesta, a lofty ridge runs south of Dongkya, bifurcating at Gipmochi 11,518 ft (3,511 m), forming two spurs that contain the valley of the Jaldhaka. The lower portion of this hilly region forms the Kalimpong Hills. Four great hill ranges radiate from a single point at Ghum, a saddle 7,372 ft (2,247 m) high – the first, the Ghum range running due west to Simanabasti; the second, the Senchal-Mahaldiram range sloping south towards Kurseong, the highest points being East Senchel 8,600 ft (2,600 m), Tiger Hill 8,515 ft (2,595 m) and West Senchel 8,163 ft (2,488 m); the third, the Takdah or Takbu range, sloping north-east to a point above the junction of the Great Rangit and Teesta; the fourth, the Darjeeling Jalapahar Range, extending northwards towards Darjeeling.

Rangli Rangliot CD block is part of the Darjeeling Himalayas physiographic region. This region is highest in elevation and covers the northernmost part of the district. The Singalila Ridge, the highest mountain range in the district and the state, is part of this region. Sandakphu 11,929 ft (3,636 m) and Phalut 11,800 ft (3,600 m) are the highest points in West Bengal.

The Rammam River flows along the northern border with Sikkim covering both Darjeeling Pulbazar and Rangli Rangliot CD blocks, before it joins the Teesta.

Rangli Rangliot CD block is bounded by the South Sikkim district of Sikkim on the north, Kalimpong I CD block on the east, Kurseong CD block on the south and Jorebunglow Sukhiapokhri and Darjeeling Pulbazar CD blocks on the west.

The Rangli Rangliot CD block has an area of 272.99 km^{2}. It has 1 panchayat samity, 11 gram panchayats, 107 gram sansads (village councils), 29 mouzas and 29 inhabited villages. Rangli Rangliot police station serves this block. Headquarters of this CD block is at Takdah.

Gram panchayats in Rangli Rangliot CD block are: Labdah, Lamahatta, Maneydara, Pubang-Rampuria, Rangli, Ressep, Rongchong, Singrimatam, Tackling I, Tackling II and Takdah.

== Demographics ==
=== Population ===
According to the 2011 Census of India, the Rangli Rangliot CD block had a total population of 70,125, all of which were rural. There were 35,025 (50%) males and 35,100 (50%) females. There were 6,163 persons in the age range of 0 to 6 years. The Scheduled Castes numbered 3,893 (5.55%) and the Scheduled Tribes numbered 23,187 (33.07%).

Large villages (with 4,000+ population) in the Rangli Rangliot CD block are (2011 census figures in brackets): Peshok Tea Garden (4,200), Teesta Valley Tea Garden (6,600), Pumong Tea Garden (6,628) and Mangpu Cinchona Plantation (13,768).

Other villages in the Rangli Rangliot CD block include (2011 census figures in brackets): Manedara (1,376), Tukdah (3,061), Labdah Khasmahal (1,431), Reshop Bazar (856), Rangli Rangliot Tea Garden (2,616), Pubong Khasmahal (1,637), Kambal Tea Garden (3,896), Lapchu Tea Garden (1,809) and Tukdh Tea Garden (3,861),

=== Literacy ===
According to the 2011 census the total number of literate persons in the Rangli Rangliot CD block was 51,492 (80.50% of the population over 6 years) out of which males numbered 27,950 (87.68% of the male population over 6 years) and females numbered 23,542 (73.38% of the female population over 6 years). The gender disparity (the difference between female and male literacy rates) was 14.30%.

See also – List of West Bengal districts ranked by literacy rate

Literacy in CD blocks of
Darjeeling district (2011)
Darjeeling Sadar subdivision
Darjeeling Pulbazar – 80.78%
Rangli Rangliot – 80.50%
Jorebunglow Sukhiapokhri – 82.54%
Kalimpong subdivision
Kalimpong I – 81.43%
Kalimpong II – 79.68%
Gorubathan – 76.88%
Kurseong subdivision
Kurseong – 81.15%
Mirik subdivision
Mirik – 80.84%
Siliguri subdivision
Matigara – 74.78%
Naxalbari – 75.47%
Phansidewa – 64.46%
Kharibari – 67.37%
2011 Census: CD Block Wise

Primary Census Abstract Data

=== Language and religion ===
Religion in Rangli Rangliot CD block (2011)
Hinduism	58.99%
Buddhism	31.74%
Christian	8.12%
Islam	0.44%
Kirat Mundhum	0.40%
Other or not stated	0.31%

In the 2011 census, Hindus numbered 41,365 and formed 58.99% of the population in the Rangli Rangliot CD block. Buddhists numbered 22,260 and formed 31.74% of the population. Christians numbered 5,963 and formed 8.12% of the population. Muslims numbered 306 and formed 0.44% of the population. Others numbered 283 and formed 0.40% of the population.

Nepali was the predominant language, spoken by 96.76% of the population.

The West Bengal Official Language Act 1961 declared that Bengali and Nepali were to be used for official purposes in the three hill subdivisions of Darjeeling, Kalimpong and Kurseong in Darjeeling district.

== Rural Poverty ==
According to the Rural Household Survey in 2005, 24.40% of the total number of families were BPL families in the Darjeeling district. According to a World Bank report, as of 2012, 4-9% of the population in Darjeeling, North 24 Parganas and South 24 Parganas districts were below poverty level, the lowest among the districts of West Bengal, which had an average 20% of the population below poverty line.

== Economy ==
=== Livelihood ===
Livelihood
in Rangli Rangliot CD block
1. Cultivators (8.28%)
2. Agricultural labourers (15.1%)
3. Household industries (1.79%)
4. Other Workers (74.8%)

In the Rangli Rangliot CD block in 2011, among the class of total workers, cultivators numbered 2,179 and formed 8.28%, agricultural labourers numbered 3,974 and formed 15.09%, household industry workers numbered 471 and formed 1.79% and other workers numbered 19,704 and formed 74.84%. Total workers numbered 26,328 and formed 37.54% of the total population, and non-workers numbered 43,797 and formed 62.46% of the population.

Note: In the census records a person is considered a cultivator, if the person is engaged in cultivation/ supervision of land owned by self/government/institution. When a person who works on another person's land for wages in cash or kind or share, is regarded as an agricultural labourer. Household industry is defined as an industry conducted by one or more members of the family within the household or village, and one that does not qualify for registration as a factory under the Factories Act. Other workers are persons engaged in some economic activity other than cultivators, agricultural labourers and household workers. It includes factory, mining, plantation, transport and office workers, those engaged in business and commerce, teachers, entertainment artistes and so on.

=== Infrastructure ===
There are 29 inhabited villages in the Rangli Rangliot CD block, as per the District Census Handbook, Darjiling, 2011. 100% villages have power supply. 100% villages have drinking water supply. 12 villages (41.38%) have post offices. 26 villages (89.66%) have telephones (including landlines, public call offices and mobile phones). 19 villages (65.52%) have pucca (paved) approach roads and 10 villages (34.48%) have transport communication (includes bus service, rail facility and navigable waterways). 6 villages (20.69%) have agricultural credit societies and 3 villages (10.34%) have banks.

=== Agriculture ===
In 2012–13, there were 34 fair price shops in Rangli Rangliot CD block.

In 2013–14, Rangli Rangliot CD block produced 82 tonnes of Aman paddy, the main winter crop, from 46 hectares, 1 tonne of wheat from 1 hectare, 4,005 tonnes of maize from 1,552 hectares and 11,519 tonnes of potatoes from 529 hectares. It also produced pulses and oilseeds.

=== Tea gardens ===
Darjeeling tea "received the iconic status due to its significant aroma, taste and colour... the first Indian product to be marked with the Geographical Indication (GI) tag in 2003... As per the definition, "Darjeeling Tea" can only refer to tea that has been cultivated, grown, produced, manufactured and processed in tea gardens in few specific hilly areas of the district." Apart from the hill areas, tea is also grown in the plain areas of the terai and dooars, but such gardens are not covered under the GI tag.

As of 2009–10, there were 87 tea gardens covered under the GI tag, employing 51,091 persons. Total land under cultivation was 17,828.38 hectares and total production was 7.36 million kg. A much larger population is indirectly dependent on the tea industry in the district. The average annual production including those from the plain areas, exceeds 10 million kg.

As of 2013, Darjeeling subdivision had 46 tea estates, Kalimpong subdivision had 29 tea estates and Kurseong subdivision had 6 tea gardens. This added up to 81 tea estates in the hill areas. Bannackburn Tea Estate and Lingia Tea Estate in Darjeeling were the first to come up in 1835. Siliguri subdivision in the terai region had 45 tea estates.

=== Banking ===
In 2012–13, Rangli Rangliot CD block had offices of 2 commercial banks and 2 gramin banks.

== Transport ==
Rangli Rangliot CD block has 3 originating/ terminating bus routes. The nearest railway station is 15 km from the block headquarters.

State Highway 12 passes through Rangli Rangliot CD block.

== Education ==
In 2012–13, Rangli Rangliot CD block had 113 primary schools with 6,481 students, 7 middle schools with 2,035 students, 4 high schools with 2,111 students and 3 higher secondary schools with 2,769 students. Rangli Rangliot CD block had 186 institutions for special and non-formal education with 6,273 students.

See also – Education in India

According to the 2011 census, in Rangli Rangliot CD block, among the 29 inhabited villages, all villages have primary schools, 25 villages had two or more primary schools, 19 villages had at least 1 primary and 1 middle school and 12 villages had at least 1 middle and 1 secondary school.

== Healthcare ==
In 2013, Rangli Rangliot CD block had 1 hospital, 1 rural hospital and 2 primary health centres with total 60 beds and 1 doctor (excluding private bodies). It had 19 family welfare subcentres. 753 patients were treated indoor and 19,284 patients were treated outdoor in the hospitals, health centres and subcentres of the CD block.

Takdah Rural Hospital, with 30 beds at Takdah, is the major government medical facility in the Rangli Rangliot CD block. There are primary health centres at Singrington (with 10 beds) and Takling (with 4 beds).
