= Darjeeling tea =

Type of black tea from India

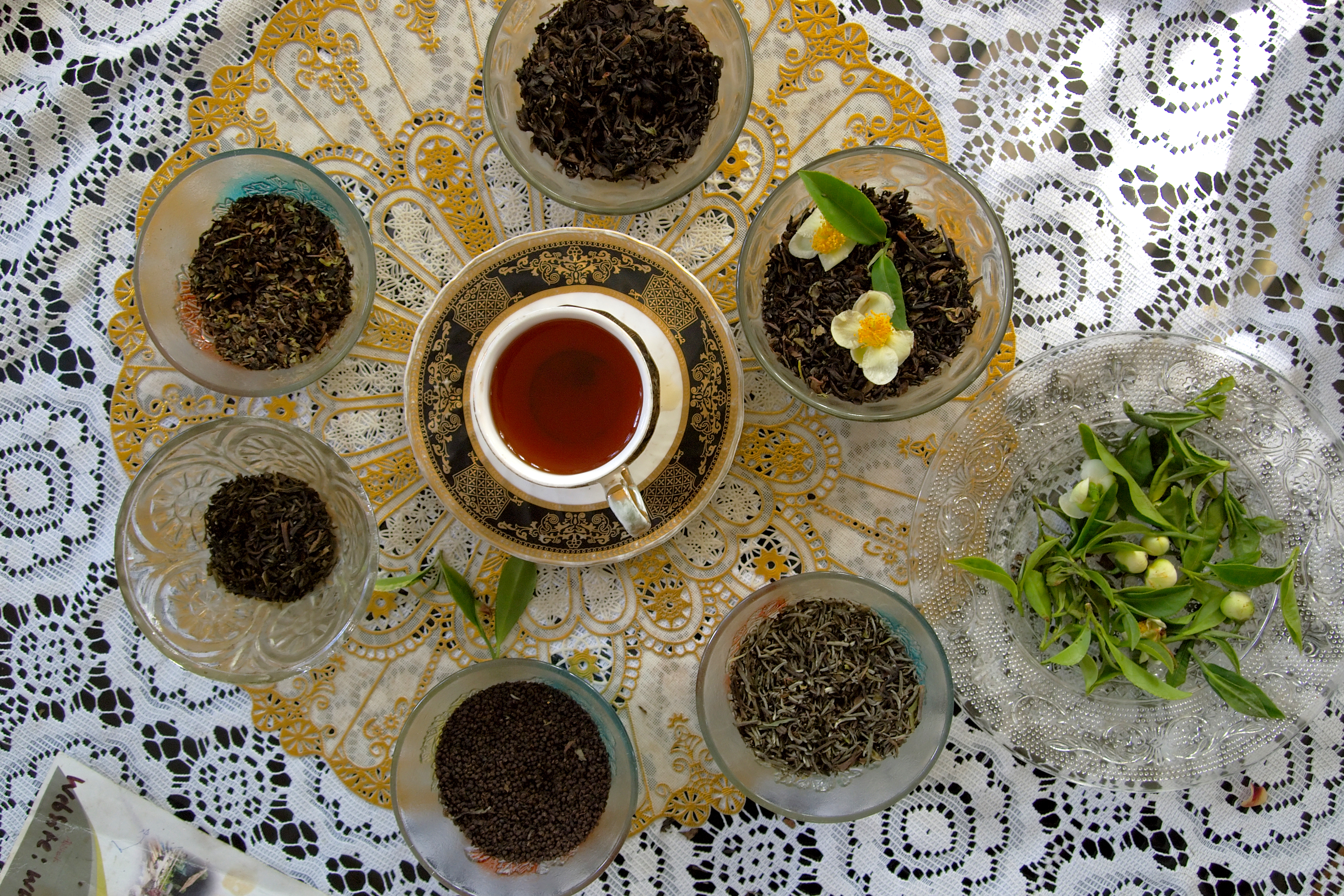
- Type: Black (green, white and oolong also produced)
- Origin: India
- Quick description: Floral, fruit aroma, muscatel
- Temperature: 90 °C (194 °F) to 95 °C (203 °F)
- Time: 3 to 4 minutes

Darjeeling tea is a tea made from Camellia sinensis var. sinensis that is grown and processed in Darjeeling district or Kalimpong district in West Bengal, India. Since 2004, the term Darjeeling tea has been a registered geographical indication referring to products produced on certain estates within Darjeeling and Kalimpong. The tea leaves are processed as black tea, though some estates have expanded their product offerings to include leaves suitable for making green, white, and oolong teas.

The tea leaves are harvested by plucking the plant's top two leaves and the bud, from March to November, a time span that is divided into four flushes. The first flush consists of the first few leaves grown after the plant's winter dormancy and produce a light floral tea with a slight astringency; this flush is also suitable for producing a white tea. Second flush leaves are harvested after the plant has been attacked by a leafhopper and the camellia tortrix so that the leaves create a tea with a distinctive muscatel aroma. The warm and wet weather of monsoon flush rapidly produces leaves that are less flavorful and are often used for blending. The autumn flush produces teas similar to, but more muted than, the second flush.

Tea plants were first planted in the Darjeeling region in the mid-1800s. At the time, the British were seeking an alternative supply of tea apart from China and attempted growing the plant in several candidate areas in India. Both the newly discovered assamica variety and the sinensis variety were planted, but the sloped drainage, cool winters, and cloud cover favoured var. sinensis. The British established numerous tea plantations, with the majority of workers being Gorkhas and Lepchas from Nepal and Sikkim. After independence, the estates were all subsequently sold to businesses in India and regulated under the laws of India. The Soviet Union replaced the British as the primary consumers of tea from Darjeeling. As Darjeeling tea gained a reputation for its distinctiveness and quality, it was marketed more to Western Europe, with many estates acquiring organic, biodynamic, and fairtrade certifications and the Tea Board of India pursuing authentication and international promotion of Darjeeling teas.

== History ==
Camellia sinensis was first planted in the Darjeeling area in 1841 by Archibald Campbell who was working for the East India Company in this jungle-covered, sparsely populated area to develop a hill station for use by the British stationed in Kolkata. At the time, the British were seeking a source of tea outside of China and had both recently discovered a second variety of the plant growing in the wilderness of Assam and smuggled seeds and plantings out of China. The Chinese variety (sinensis) was planted in Saharanpur Botanical Gardens and propagated in other Himalayan gardens where Campbell had acquired seeds from Kumaun via Nathaniel Wallich. While the original plantings succeeded, Campbell moved to Lebong where he and several other residents planted a new batch, in 1846, of both varieties (sinensis and assamica). A year after planting the first three Company experimental tea gardens in 1852, at Tukvar, Steinthal and Alubari, they reported having 2,000 tea plants and Robert Fortune was sent to provide an expert opinion on the "suitableness of the climate and soil of the Hills for the cultivation and manufacture of Tea". While both varieties grew, the sinensis variety was flourishing, as it was found assamica preferred warmer and wetter growing conditions while sinensis had been selectively cultivated for higher elevations. The first commercial tea gardens were established in 1856 and by 1866 there were 39 tea gardens in Darjeeling, including the Makaibari Tea Estate which had established the region's first processing factory for withering and oxidation, necessary for the product to survive the months long journey down to Kolkata and over to Britain. Success of assamica at the nearby Dooars-Terai tea gardens led to infrastructure investments that would be extend up the Darjeeling Himalayan hill region, allowing more machinery and supplies to reach the tea gardens. Darjeeling's population had grown from less than a 100 in the 1830s to 95,000 people with 100 tea gardens in 1885, predominantly Indian Gorkha and Lepcha migrants from Nepal and Sikkim, as the Darjeeling Himalayan Railway, the use of steamships and the Suez Canal reduced shipping times.

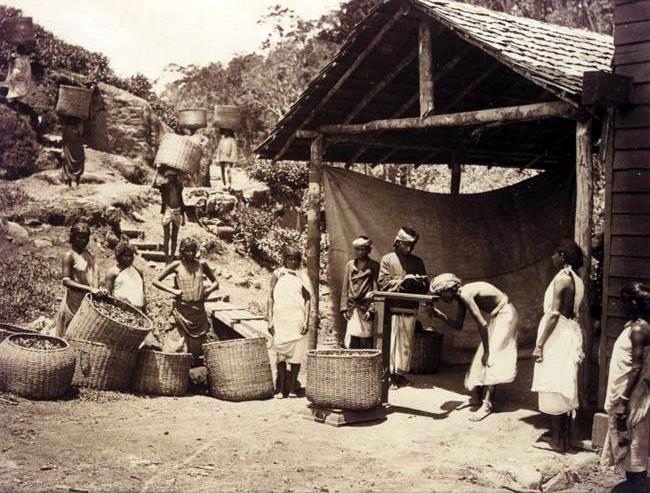
Darjeeling tea workers, c. 1890

After the British nationalized the East India Company, it only ever leased the lands to tea garden owners on a 30-year basis and maintained the practice of permitting only 40% to be used for tea crops, with 40% being left natural and 20% for housing and facilities. Following Indian independence in 1947, practices shifted as the British began to sell their stakes in the gardens to Indians and the 1953 Tea Act put the tea industry under the regulatory jurisdiction of the Tea Board of India. With more area being opened for tea crops at the expense of natural area and the introduction of pesticides and fertilizers, yields increased from 7.8 to 10 million kilograms between 1950 and 1960, though this came at the cost of increased soil instability. Despite a limited exemption for the tea industry the 1973 Foreign Exchange Regulations Act the new foreign ownership limitations resulted in Indian nationals becoming majority owners of the Darjeeling tea industry. As the Soviet Union replaced the United Kingdom as India's largest tea customers, Darjeeling gardens were supplemented with assamica plantings to accommodate their preference for that variety.

Production methods again shifted in the 1990s as Western Europe and Japan replaced the collapsed Soviet Union as Darjeeling's principal customers and new garden managers were bringing the principles of biodynamic agriculture to their practices. In 1988, Makaibari became the first tea estate in India to attain organic certification, followed by Tumsong, and the first to gain biodynamic certification, in 1993, followed by Ambootia. Darjeeling could not compete with other tea regions in terms of quantity or price (due to its geographic limitations, remoteness, slower plant growth, inability to mechanize, among other factors) or so it focused on quality. While the certifications provided an indication of a superior product, its practices also helped the gardens cope with erosion, slope instability and soil depletion that had become prevalent with pesticide and artificial fertilizer applications on the rainy hillsides. Yields had reached 14 million kilograms in 1994 but, with organic practices over much of the tea gardens, yields fell to an average of 9 million kilograms in the late-2010s. In pursuit of differentiating Darjeeling tea, the Darjeeling Planter's Association had been established in 1983, to promote the product in other countries. According to estimate by Tea Board of India, 7,010,000 kilograms (15,450,000 lb) of Darjeeling tea was produced in 2021; this constitutes about 0.5% of the total 1,343,060,000 kilograms (2.96094×10^{9} lb) produced in India.

=== Logo and trade mark ===
Darjeeling tea logo

In 1983 a logo was created, currently property of the Tea Board of India, consisting of the side profile of a woman holding two leaves and a bud. It is registered as a certification trade mark in the United Kingdom, United States, Australia and Taiwan, as a collective trade mark in the EU and registered internationally in the Madrid system. In 2000, the Tea Board created new licensing requirements for Darjeeling tea exporters, including product authentication and a prohibition on blending, which allowed them to issue certificates of origin. In 2004, Darjeeling tea became India's first product to receive legal geographical indication protection under the World Trade Organization's TRIPS Agreement and in 2011 it was given Protected Geographical Indication status in the European Union.

== Terroir ==
Environmental factors combined with a history of organized cultivation and processing has created a terroir unique to Darjeeling tea. It has been marketed as the "Champagne of teas" and been subject to undisclosed blending with other teas or purposeful mis-labelling. Relative to other teas, Darjeeling tea is most similar to Nepali tea.

=== Geography and climate ===
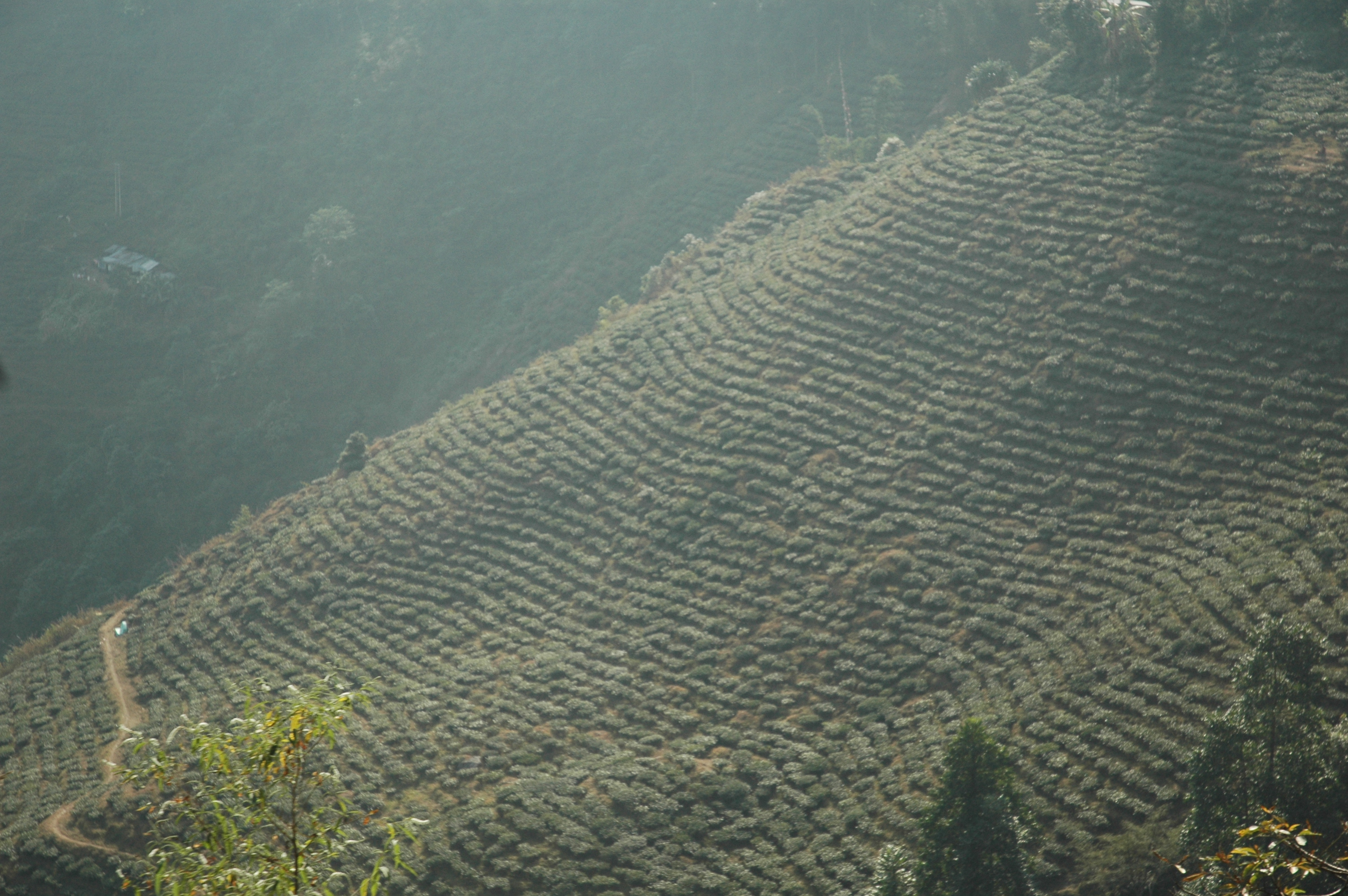
Darjeeling tea plantation

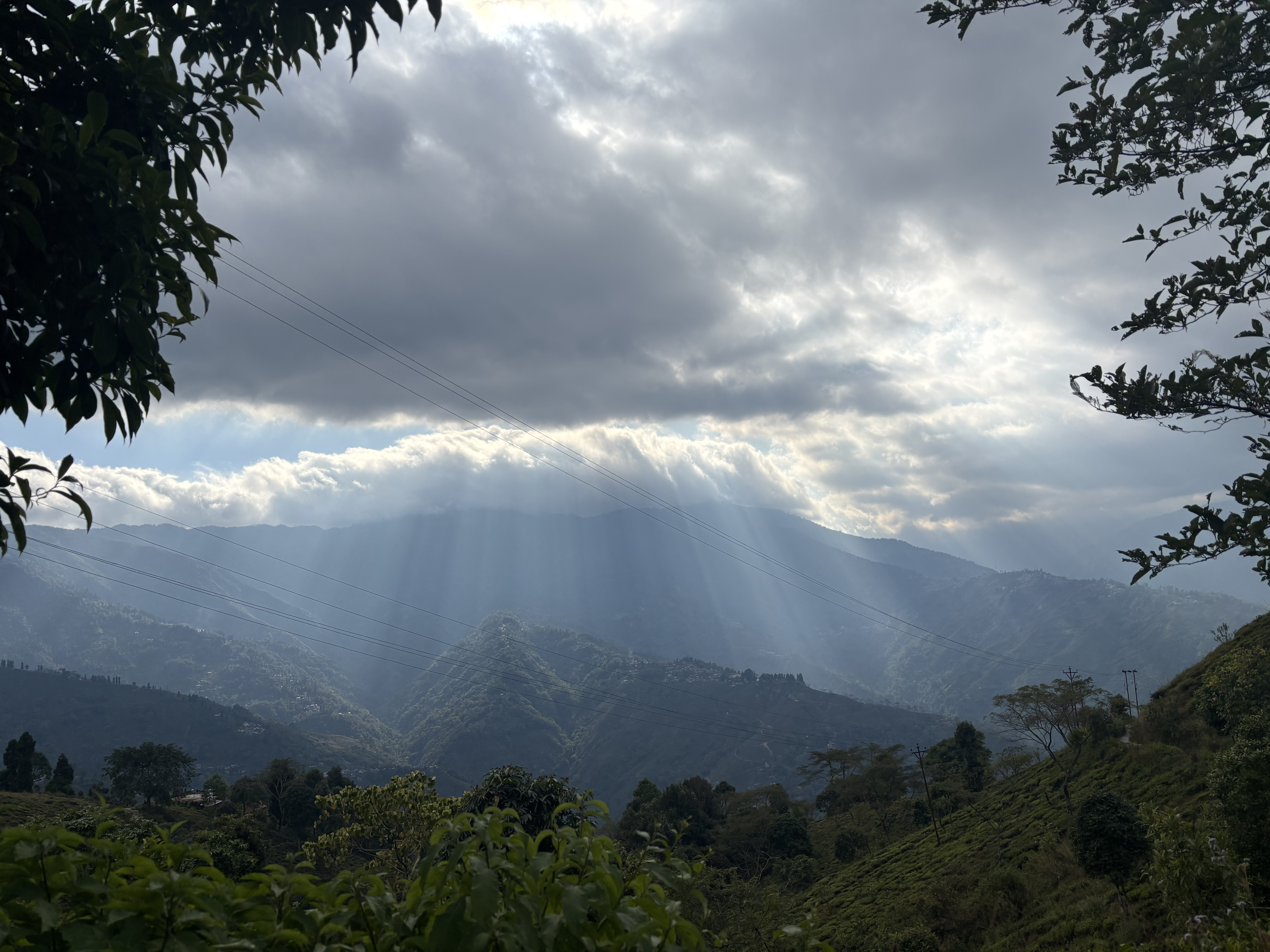
Darjeeling Teascape

Darjeeling tea is grown in the Darjeeling and Kalimpong districts, an area bound by Nepal to the west, Bhutan to the east and Sikkim to the north. The Tea Board of India defines "Darjeeling Tea" as having "been cultivated, grown, produced, manufactured and processed in tea gardens in the hilly areas of Sadar Subdivision, only hilly areas of Kalimpong District..., and Kurseong subdivision...of the District of Darjeeling in the State of West Bengal, India." The tea gardens are located on the hillsides of the Eastern Himalaya, between 600 and 2,000 metres in elevation. That physical geography of the Darjeeling Himalayan hill region, between the Himalayas and the Bay of Bengal, results in the land experiencing cool air with dry winter months from November to February followed by monsoon weather in the summer months between July and September. The subtropical and wet temperate forest cover that developed under these conditions left slightly acidic loamy soils with high organic materials. Being on steep slopes, the soil is well-drained and deep enough for long root systems, necessary for anchoring soil on slopes. Being on the sides of the hills, at high elevations where cool dry air interacts with warm moist air, there can be persistent fog or cloud cover during the growing months. These are ideal conditions for the Camellia sinensis sinensis plant which flourishes with well-drained, slightly acidic soils, with periods of dormancy, and limited direct sunlight.

=== Cultivation ===
The Camellia sinensis seeds originally planted came from China but new plantings come predominantly from saplings taken from a few cultivars, such as Bannockburn 157, Phoobsering 312 and Ambari Vegetative 2, which have been specifically adapted for Darjeeling. The climate creates four distinct periods of cultivation, each of which has unique characteristics. The plants are plucked by hand every five to ten days, most typically of their top two leaves and a bud, however, based on growing conditions and desired product just the bud or the bud and top leaf may sometimes be plucked.

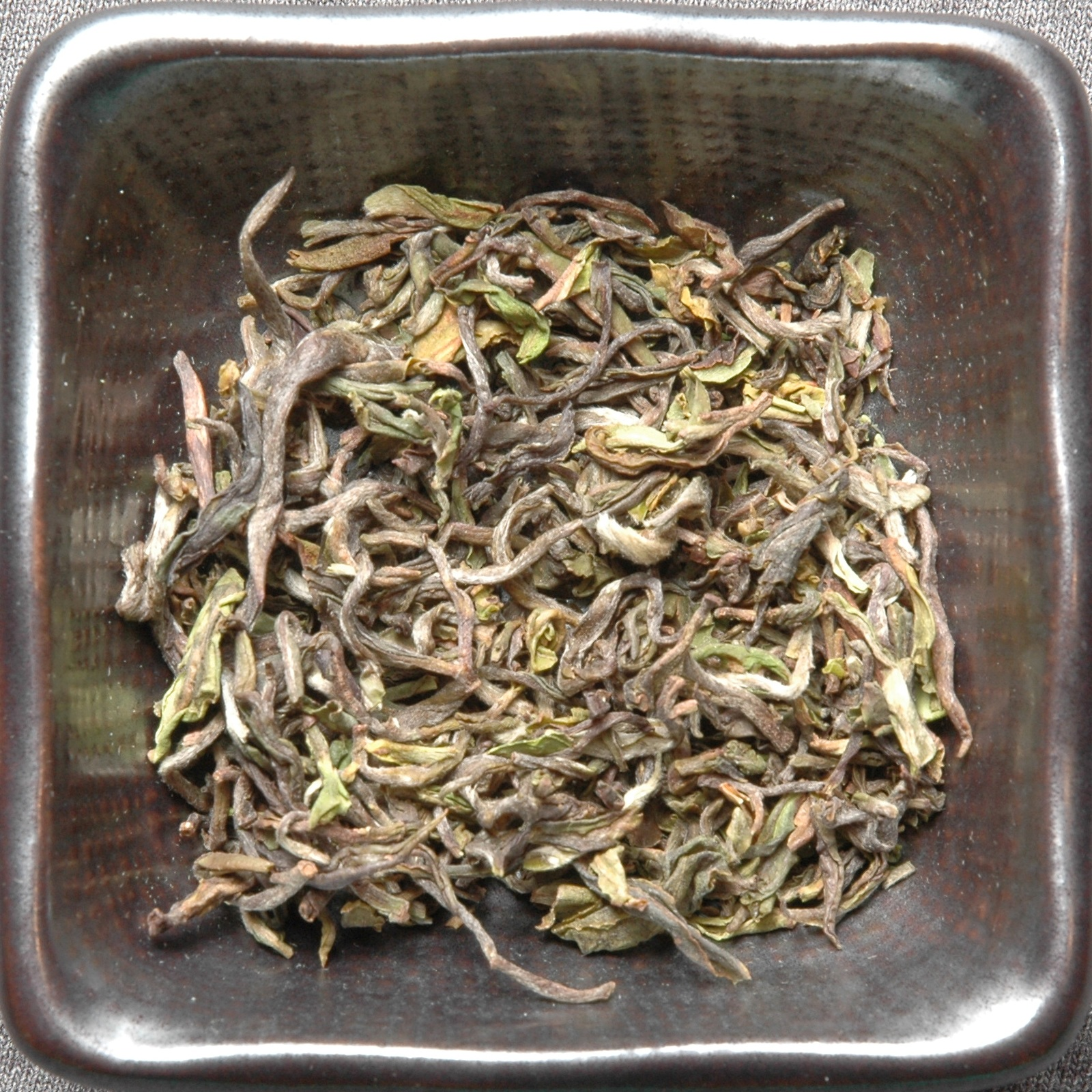

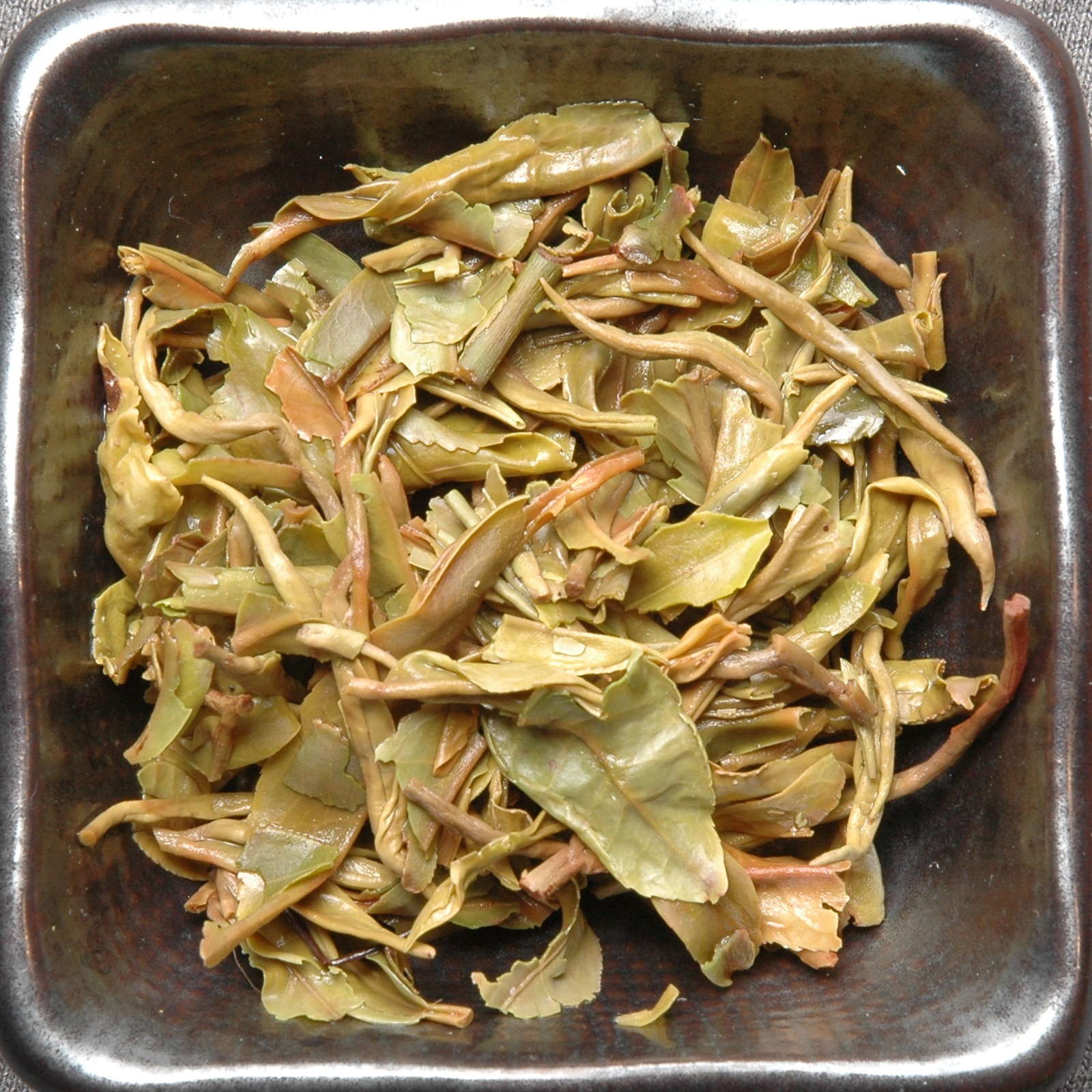
First flush Darjeeling tea before and after steeping

The first pluckings in Spring, generally March into May, are referred to as the first flush. These first leaves following the winter dormancy are the most tender leaves the plant will produce and result in a tea that has a gentle, very light colour and aroma, and a mild astringency (or briskness). The second flush is harvested in May and June, after the Empoasca and Homona coffearia have attacked the plant, releasing compounds that create a distinctive full-bodied muscatel flavour in the tea. The attacks by the leafhopper and moth release defensive chemicals from the plant and naturally begins oxidation process within the leaves. These first two flushes are the most sought after by tea connoisseurs.

The plant rapidly grows during the monsoon flush from July to September with larger and less flavourful leaves. The persistent rain also results in less complete withering and oxidization during the processing stage. Some estates create green or white teas from these as they demand less withering and no oxidation; however, when completed as black tea, this flush is often sold below the cost of production for use in blending and domestic consumption. After the rainy season, the final leaves grown before the plant's winter dormancy are referred to as the autumnal flush. They are harvested in October–November and provide a herbaceous and soft muscatel flavour, but with a fuller body and darker colour than previous flushes, favorably compared with Nepali teas.

=== Processing ===
With few exceptions, Darjeeling produces black teas. Each tea estate operates their own equipment so that processing can begin the same day as plucking. The leaves are first brought indoors where they are air blown overnight to dry them sufficiently so that their cells can be ruptured, initiating oxidation, when rolled without breaking the leaf. Darjeeling teas, especially the first flush, tend to be withered longer than other black teas; a hard wither can reduce a leaf's water content by more than half, affecting polyphenol oxidase activity and leaving a more green appearance. Some tea estates will produce a batch of Darjeeling oolong tea by limiting the amount of oxidation. After rolling, the leaves are left to oxidize on trays before being fired to reduce the moisture level down to approximately 2% and sealing the ruptures which will be reopened with consumer's hot water. The sorting of the dried product according to tea leaf grading is completed and shipped to Kolkata for auctioning, though many estates sell privately under contracts.

=== Preparation, flavour and aroma ===
With the exception of the first flush, orthodox (i.e. not crush, tear, curl) Darjeeling teas are generally prepared in the same manner as other black teas. Tea connoisseurs recommend a water temperature ranging between 90 °C (194 °F) and 95 °C (203 °F) in a single infusion of 3 to 4 minutes, whereas first flushes, like other early spring teas such as Jin Jun Mei tea, use water of slightly lower temperature at 85 to 90 °C and an infusion time of 2 to 3 minutes. For every 150 milliliters (2/3 cup) of water used, 2 to 3 grams (one tablespoon) of loose leaf tea is added. As Darjeeling teas are low in malt and bitter characteristics and are appreciated for delicate floral and fruit aromas, milk and sweeteners are typically not added. Their high tannin content allows them to be paired well with carbohydrate-rich foods, such as baked goods and pasta.

Darjeeling teas are best known for the muscatel flavour, described as a "musky spiciness", "a unique muscat-like fruitiness in aroma and flavour", that develops in the second flush and is present to a lesser degree in the subsequent autumnal flush. While general tea flavours are created by thearubigins and theaflavins, chemical analysis on Darjeeling teas show their unique muscatel flavour is the result of 3,7-dimethyl-1,5,7-octatrien-3-ol and 2,6-dimethyl-3,7-octa-diene-2,6-diol, with other aromatic compounds coming from linalool, benzyl alcohol, cis-3-hexenol, α-farnesene, benzyl nitrile, indole, nerolidol and ocimene. Otherwise, Darjeeling teas are described as possessing a flowery fragrance and fruity (grapes, plums, apricots, peaches, pineapple, guava, or citrus fruits), flowery and woody aroma notes, and a little more astringency than their Chinese counterparts.

== Organisation ==
The Tea Board of India recognises 87 tea estates (also called "tea gardens") as producers of Darjeeling tea. Cumulatively, they cover 17,500 hectares of land. Apart from these estates, a relatively small amount of tea is produced in farm cooperatives but they lack processing and quality control infrastructure. Some of the notable tea estates include:

- Arya
- Avongrove
- Badamtam
- Balasun
- Castleton
- Glenburn
- Gopaldhara
- Happy Valley
- Jungpana
- Lopchu
- Makaibari
- Margaret's Hope
- North Tukvar
- Okayti
- Peshok
- Phoobsering
- Phuguri
- Pussimbing
- Puttabong
- Rangli Rangliot
- Teesta Valley
- Thurbo
- Mission Hill

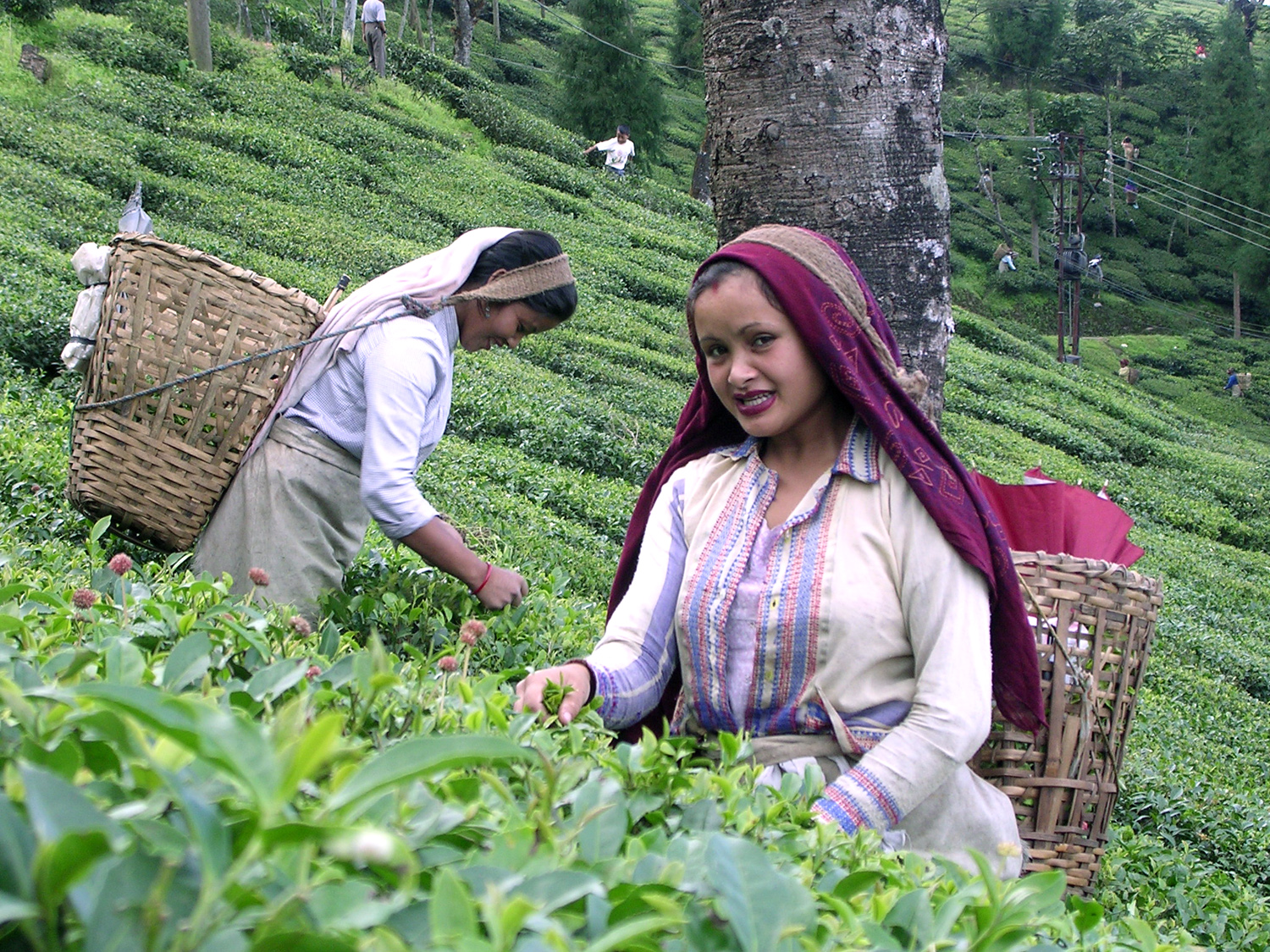
Women plucking tea on a Darjeeling tea estate

The Government of West Bengal owns the land on which the estates are located and administer 30 to 90 year leases under the West Bengal Estates Acquisition Act to companies operating the estates. The West Bengal government is also involved in providing regulatory supervision of numerous aspects of estate operations, including land use and labour agreements. The Darjeeling Tea Association (affiliated with the Indian Tea Association) is the trade association that represents the tea estates and exporters in business and labour affairs. They jointly negotiate together with the various unions and the government so that workers across numerous tea estates receive the same compensation.

Labour relations are complex as, in addition to the seasonal influx of temporary workers, the permanent workers can be permanent residents of the estates where, pursuant to the Plantations Labour Act, housing, education, health and other services are provided by the estate, in addition to a base salary. Because the provision of these services are required by law, fair trade organizations, such as the Fairtrade International, allow their fair trade premiums be paid to plantation owners, rather than the workers, on condition that the owners can only use the premium to offset some of the costs of providing these services. Studies of this arrangement have suggested that this has negatively affected the livelihoods of labourers, as owners have more than correspondingly reduced their contributions to the required services. This also complicates wage negotiations as marginal increases are feared to come at the expense of a loss of social services. However, the low wages contribute to a high rate of absenteeism of workers seeking higher paying work elsewhere. The tea estate workers have historically relied on workers coming from Nepal as a source of inexpensive labour. Consequently, Darjeeling, Kalimpong and Kurseong and their tea estates are populated predominantly by Indian Gorkha people. They have developed a unified ethnic identity and advocated for independence from West Bengal. Occasionally, actions of the Gorkhaland movement have disrupted operations of the Darjeeling tea estates, such as the 2017 bandh.

== See also ==
- Darjeeling Planters' Club
- North Bengal Tea Industry
