= Indian Tea Association =

Trade association based in India

- Founded: 1881
- Locations: Kolkata; Guwahati; Jorhat; Tezpur; Dibrugarh; Binnaguri; Silchar; Bagdogra; Darjeeling
- Website: indiatea.org

The Indian Tea Association (ITA) is a trade association of Indian tea producers. The head office is in Kolkata (Calcutta).

== History ==
ITA was founded in 1881 to protect the interests of tea planters in British India and to promote the consumption of Indian tea. It had its head office in London, and branches in India. The Planters' Association of Ceylon was already functioning from 1854 to represent the interests of coffee and tea plantation owners.

ITA laid down rules for the recruitment of labour for the plantations and in the early twentieth century attempted to raise the standards of treatment of labourers.

=== Colonial history ===
ITA was formed in London in 1881 with branches in Calcutta and Assam. Thomas Douglas Forsyth and Henry Hopkinson were its first chairperson and vice-chairperson respectively. It consisted of planters, representatives of tea companies, bankers, and ex-army officers of the British Indian Empire. In 1901 when the Chief Commissioner of Assam Henry Cotton recommended an increase in the wages for the plantation workers, ITA campaigned heavily against him in the Anglo-Indian press and lobbied to create trouble for him with his superiors.

Within three decades, it became an important European pressure group influencing government policies affecting the tea plantations, and also the province of Assam in general. After the Morley-Minto Reforms, the ITA succeeded in getting two seats for tea interests in Assam's Legislative Council. In 1912 the tea industry constituted three of the eleven elected seats in the council. Thereafter, they played a significant role in the making and unmaking of the provincial government. Before passing the Tea Districts Emigrant Labour Act XXII of 1932, the colonial Government of India sent copies of draft bill to ITA for their views. After several rounds of meetings between government officials and planters' representatives, recommended amendments were incorporated into the bill.

ITA's support to Muhammed Saadulah's helped his coalition to form the provincial government in 1937 as its premier. He gave his assurance that he would not introduce a legislation which would directly affect the tea industry. In addition, his Minister of Labour, Abdul Matin Chaudhury, sided with the ITA and guaranteed no legislation would hamper profits.

== Research ==
In 1911 the ITA established the Tocklai Experimental Station in Jorhat, Assam. At the beginning, its scientists focused on field techniques for cultivation and pest management. After tea from the Dutch colonies in Java and Sumatra entered the European markets in the 1920s, the institute focused on quality too to differentiate itself. With this new industry-wide focus, C. R. Harler, a chemist and meteorologist at the institute proposed a standard glossary to describe the characteristics of tea.

== Bibliography ==
- Behal, Rana P. (2014). One Hundred Years of Solitude: Political Economy of Tea Plantations in Colonial Assam. New Delhi: Tulika Books.
- Besky, Sarah (2021). "Teawords: Experiments with Quality in Indian Tea Production". American Anthropologist. 123 (1): 96–107. doi:10.1111/aman.13508.
- Ramamurthy, Anandi (2003). Imperial Persuaders: Images of Africa and Asia in British Advertising. Manchester: Manchester University Press.
