= Goodricke Group Limited =

Indian Company

Goodricke Group Limited is an India-based tea producing company headquartered in West Bengal. It is a part of the Camellia PLC UK – the world's largest private sector tea producer. The four tea producing companies in its fold include Goodricke Group Limited, Stewart Holl (India) Limited, Amgoorie India Limited and Koomber Tea Co. Pvt. Limited. The Group owns 30 gardens and 27 tea factories spread over Darjeeling, Dooars, Assam and Cachar. In recent years the Goodricke Group acquired in Assam two estates of the McLeod company being in economic difficulties. The major Darjeeling brands include Goodricke Castleton, Roasted and Margaret's Hope, while the Black (CTC) tea includes Goodricke Khaass, Goodricke Zabardast and Goodricke Chai.

== History ==
=== 1800 ===
The Sterling Tea Companies owned 17 tea estates in India with 12 in Jalpaiguri district, 3 in Darjeeling and 2 in Assam. They established tea gardens in the late 1800s and then progressively carried the business in India. The Reserve Bank of India (RBI) in pursuant to the Foreign Exchange Regulation Act (FERA 1973) granted permission to the company to carry on business with the Sterling Tea Group.

=== 14 June 1977 ===
Incorporated in West Bengal, India as a public limited Company. The objective is to cultivate, produce, treat, blend, develop, process, purchase, trade, and deal with tea in different forms.

=== 27 June 1977 ===
A certificate of Entitlement was granted by the Registrar of Companies under the terms of the Companies Act 1956. The permission was granted for the commencement of the business.

=== 1 January 1978 ===
The 8 Sterling Companies merged with the Goodricke Group Limited.

=== 2023 ===
In March, the Goodricke Group introduced four Assam Single Estate Tea brands at the Guwahati Tea Auction Centre Tea Lounge. This event marked the celebration of 200 years of the Assam tea industry.

== Gardens ==
- Darjeeling
- Assam
- Dooars

== Products ==
=== Bulk Tea ===
Both Orthodox and CTC tea from the Assam, Dooars and Darjeeling gardens are sold in volumes. They are packed in tea chests, paper sacks and jute bags, and are marketed mostly through the Public auction System, private and consignment sales, Exports and Direct Sales either in original or blended form.

=== Darjeeling ===
Some of the most popular tea variants of Goodricke Tea come from its Darjeeling Tea gardens. The gardens include Margaret's Hope, Castleton, Badamtam, Barnesbeg and Thurbo. The teas from these gardens are usually sold to buyers from Japan, Europe and the United States.

=== Assam ===
In Assam, the Orthodox tea from the gardens of Nonaipara, Harmutty, Orangajuli and Dejoo is sold in bulk in the Middle East, the UK and Germany markets. The handpicked CTCs come from the gardens of Borbam and Amgoorie and sold in bulk across India and abroad.

=== Dooars ===
This part of the Himalayan region offers CTC tea. The tea from the Leesh River and Danguajhar gardens is quite popular and, thus, sold in bulks all across.

== Brands ==
Darjeeling Tea

- Castleton Premium: Blue Caddy
- Castleton Vintage: Black Caddy
- Barnesbeg-Leaf and Teabags
- Roasted
- Thurbo
- Premium Darjeeling Tea

Black [CTC] Tea

- Khaass
- Goodricke Chai
- Zabardast

Gift Packs

- Badamtam leaf tea
- Season's 3 in 1

== See also ==
- Tea processing
- List of tea companies
