= Padma Pokhari =

Padam Pokhari पदमपोखरी Padma Pokhari
- Location in Nepal
- Coordinates: 27°24′14″N 84°58′55″E
- Country: Nepal
- Province: Bagmati Province
- District: Makwanpur District
- Submetropolitan city: Hetauda

Population (1991)
  - Total: 11,838
- Time zone: UTC+5:45 (Nepal Time)

Padam Pokhari (Nepali: पदमपोखरी) was a village development committee but now it is a part of Hetauda Submetropolitan City of Makwanpur District in the Bagmati Province of Nepal. At the time of the 1991 Nepal census, it had a population of 11,838 people living in 2073 individual households. It is surrounded by Churiyamai and Hetauda to the east, Basamadi to the north, Handikhola to the west and Parsa district to the south.
