= Mohini waterfall =

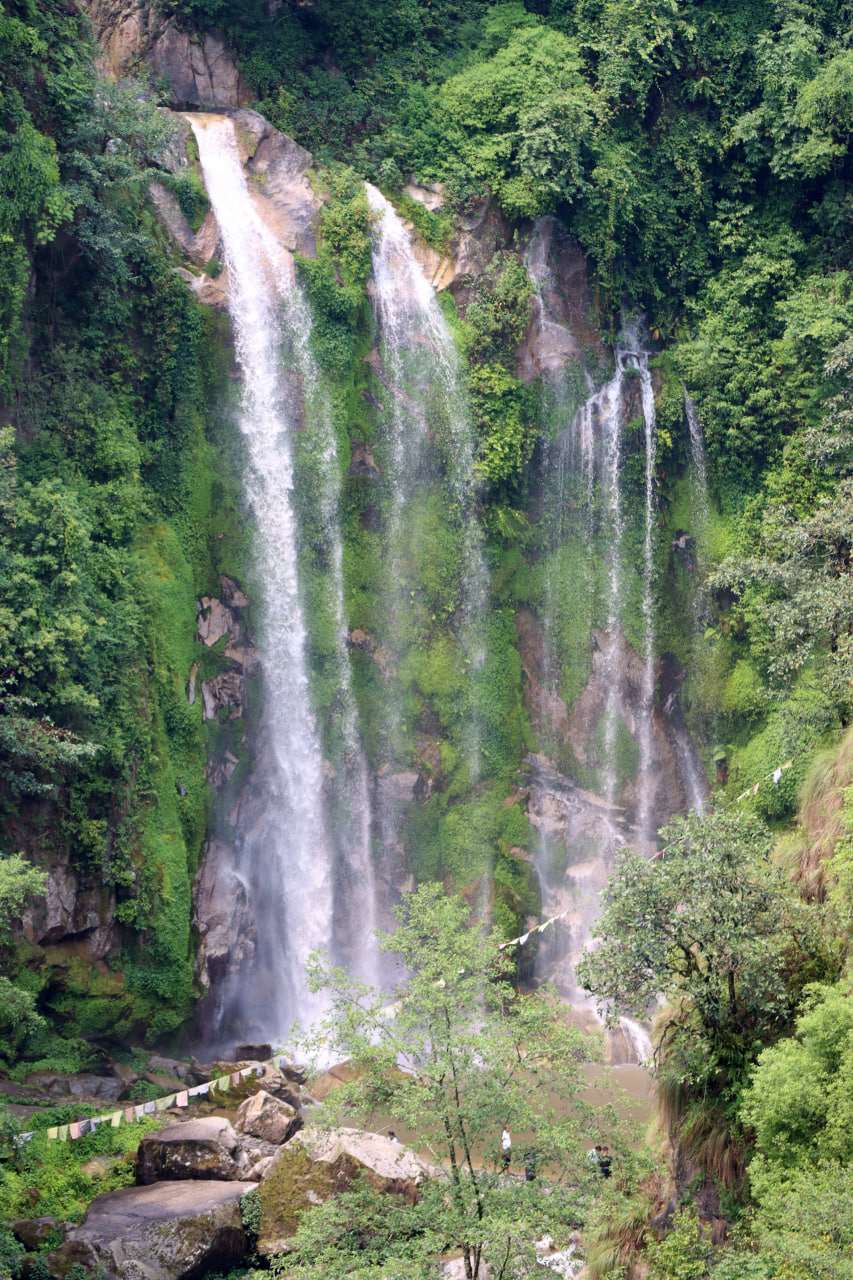

- Location within Nepal
- Location: Markhu, Makwanpur, Nepal
- Coordinates: 27°36′09″N 85°08′44″E
- Elevation: 1,300 m (4,300 ft)
- Total height: 92 metres (302 ft) approx.
- Watercourse: Kulekhani Reservoir

Mohini waterfall (Nepali: मोहिनी झरना) is a waterfall located near Kulekhani in the Indrasarowar Rural Municipality of Makwanpur District in Bagmati Province, Nepal.

== Geography and Tourism ==
Mohini waterfall is located at a distance of 30 km from Kathmandu. It is also one of the sources of Kulekhani Reservoir.

== Gallery ==
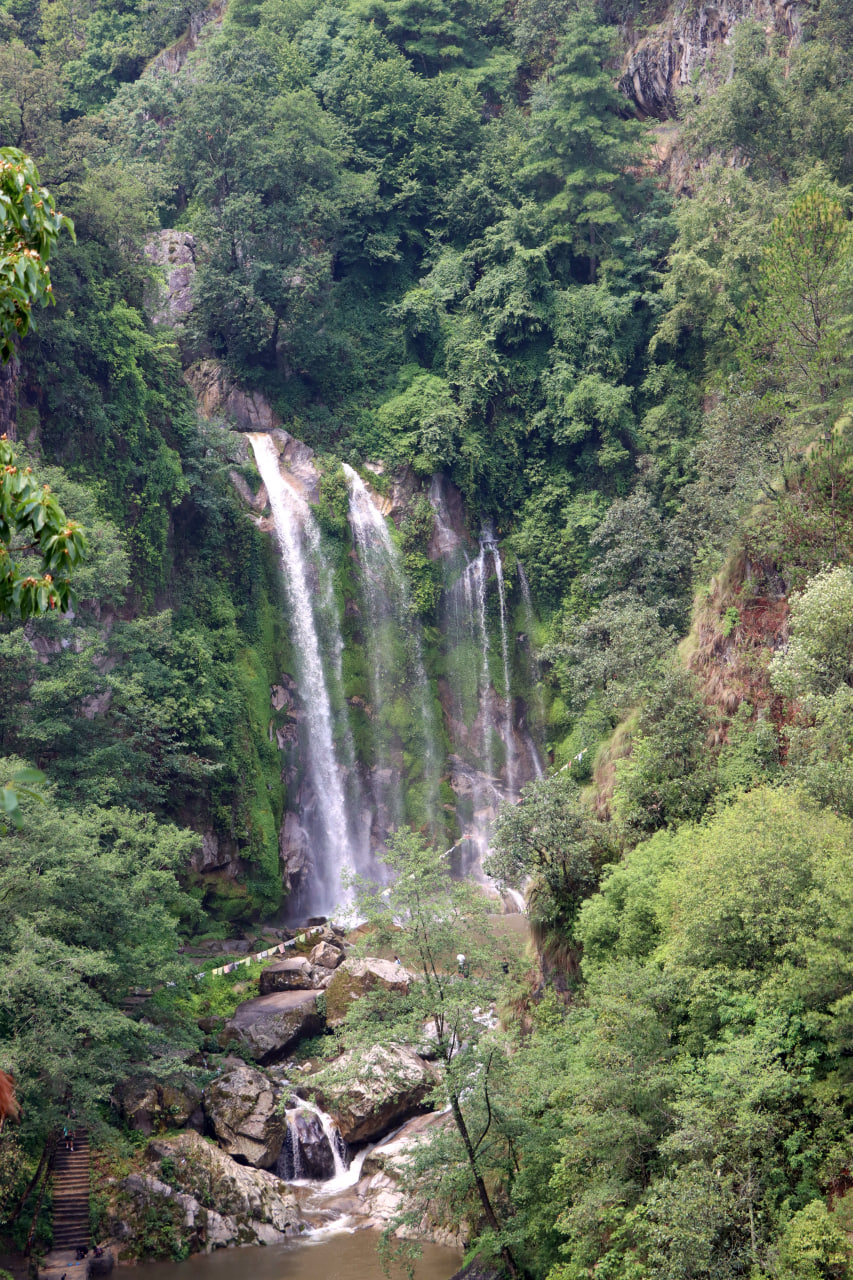
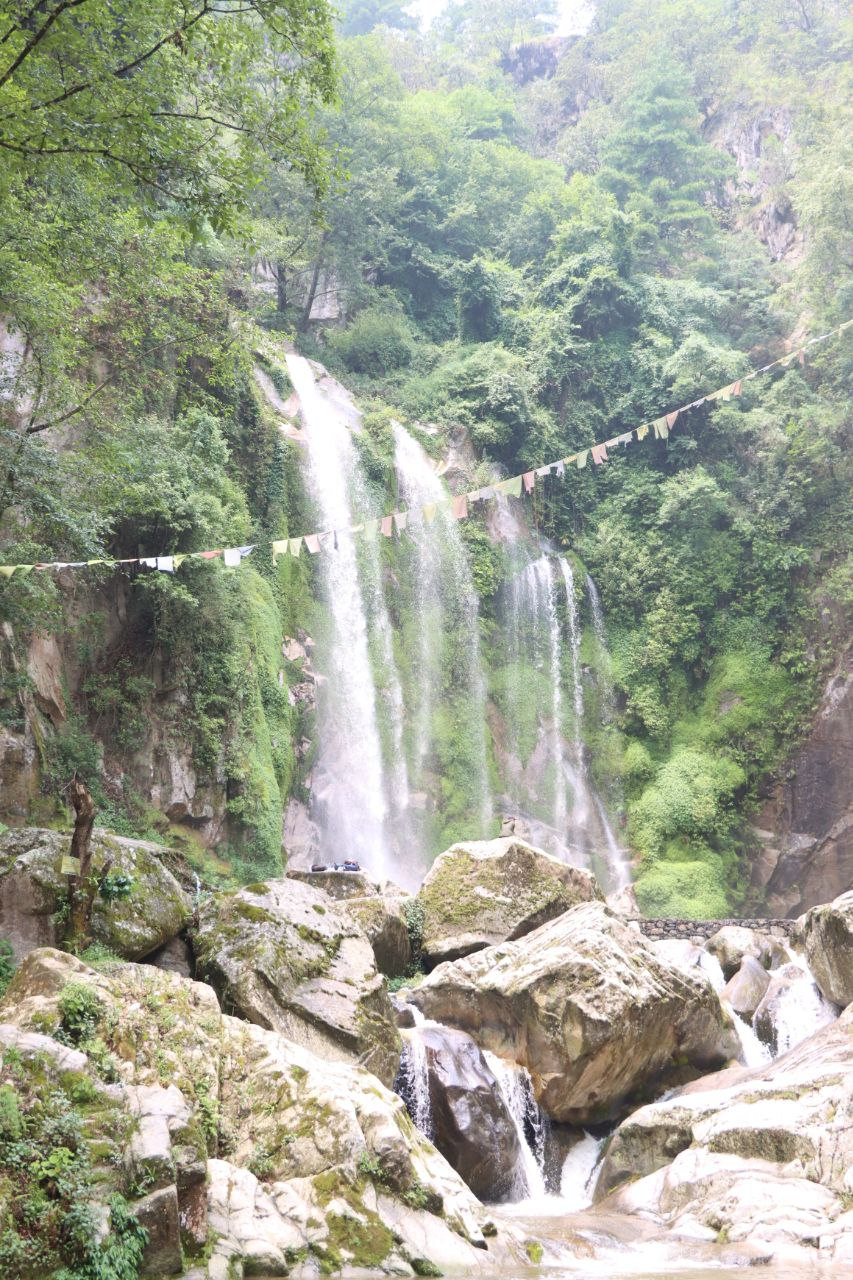

== See also ==
- List of waterfalls
- List of waterfalls of Nepal
