= Bhagmati (disambiguation) =

Bhagmati was a mystic Hindu queen from India.

Bhagmati may also refer to:

- Bhagmati (2005 film), a 2005 Indian Hindi-language film
- Bhagmati (2016 film) or Bhaagamathie, a 2018 Indian film
- Bhagmati, Hindi title of the 2012 Indian Kannada-language film Kalpana
  - Bhagmati 2, Hindi title of its 2016 sequel Kalpana 2

== See also ==
- Bagmati (disambiguation)
