= Betini =

Betini may refer to:

- Betini, Narayani, Nepal
- Betini, Sagarmatha, Nepal
