= Shikharpur =

Shikharpur may refer to:

- Shikharpur, Mahakali, Nepal
- Shikharpur, Narayani, Nepal
- Shikarpur, Pakistan, a town in the Shikarpur District of the Pakistani province of Sindh
