= Manthali =

Manthali may refer to:

- Manthali, Ramechhap, Nepal
- Manthali, Makwanpur, Nepal
