= Kankada =

Kankada काँकडा
- Village development committee
- Location in Nepal
- Coordinates: 27.63°N 84.78°E
- Country: Nepal
- Province: Bagmati Province
- District: Makwanpur District
- Rural municipality: Raksirang Rural Municipality

Population (1991)
  - Total: 6,137
- Time zone: UTC+5:45 (Nepal Time)

Kankada is a village development committee in the Raksirang Rural Municipality of Makwanpur District in the Bagmati Province of southern Nepal. At the time of the 1991 Nepal census it had a population of 6137 people living in 990 individual households.

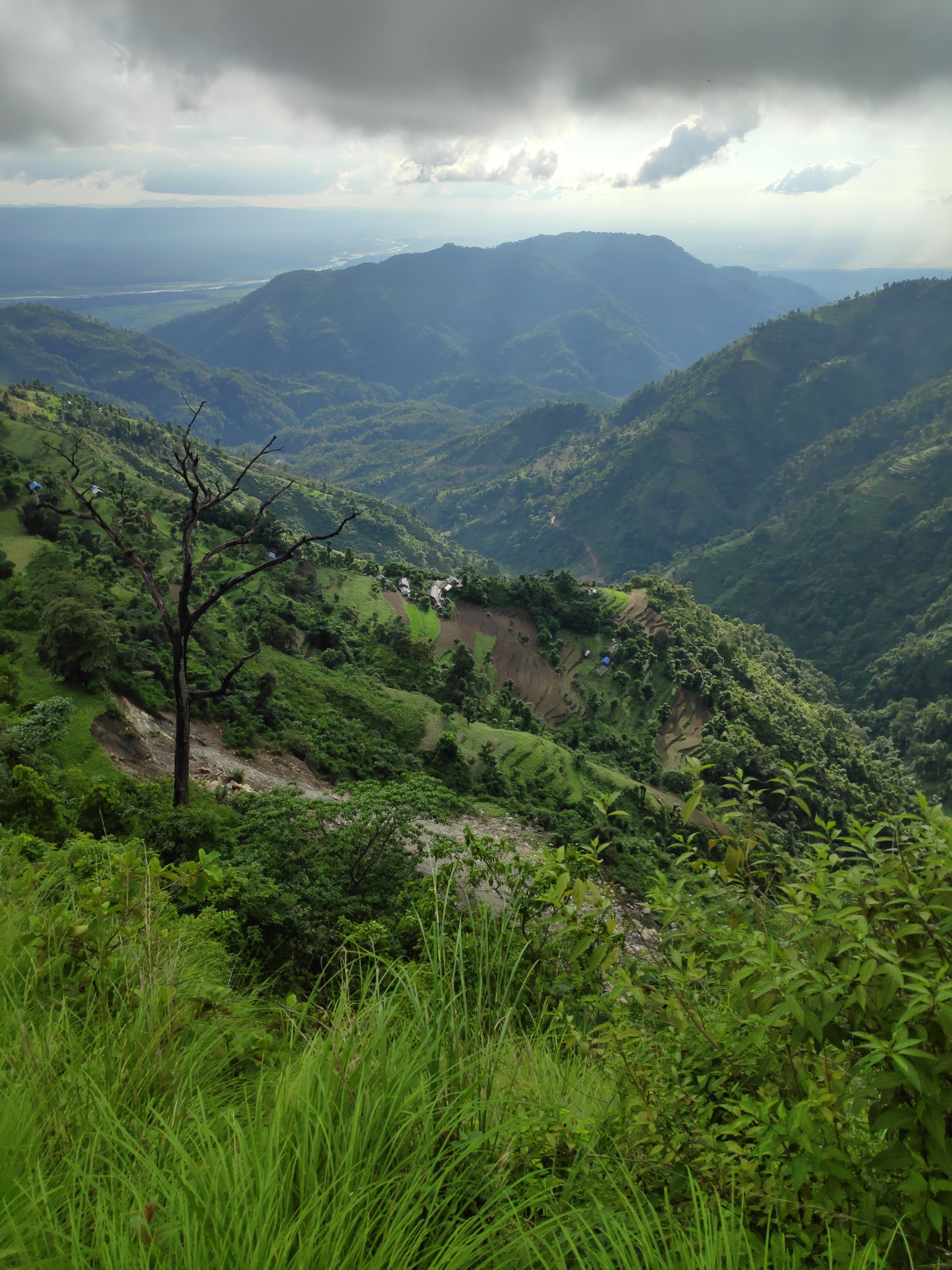
Kankada
