= Bagmati Rural Municipality =

Bagmati Rural Municipality may refer to:

- Bagmati Rural Municipality, Lalitpur, a rural council in Lalitpur District, Nepal
- Bagmati Rural Municipality, Makwanpur, a rural council in Makwanpur District of Nepal

== See also ==
- Bagmati (disambiguation)
