= Kulekhani River =

River in Nepal

Coordinates: 27°32′13″N 85°13′52″E

Kulekhani is a river in central Nepal. The average monthly flow varies from 1.13 cubic-meters-per-second in winter to 10.23 cubic-meters-per-second in Monsoon. Kulekhani Dam built on the river near Kulekhani village forms a 22-hactare lake called the Indrasarowar with a catchment area of about 126 square kilometres. The dam impound a reservoir which feeds to Kulekhani I and its cascaded hydropower projects- Kulekhani II and III.
