= Sripur Chhatiwan =

Sripur Chhatiwan श्रीपुर छतिवन Shreepur-Chhatiwan
- Village development committee
- Nickname: छत्तिवन
- Location in Nepal
- Coordinates: 27.32°N 85.21°E
- Country: Nepal
- Province: Bagmati Province
- District: Makwanpur District
- Rural municipality: Bakaiya Rural Municipality

Population (2011)
  - Total: 21,523
- Time zone: UTC+5:45 (Nepal Time)

Sripur Chhatiwan (Nepali: श्रिपुर छतिवन ) a village development committee in the Bakaiya Rural Municipality of Makwanpur District in the Bagmati Province of Nepal. At the time of the 2011 Nepal census it had a population of 21,523 holding its position to highest population rank among the list of village development committees of Nepal.
