= Bagmati (disambiguation) =

Bagmati River is a river in Nepal.

Bagmati may also refer to places in Nepal:

- Bagmati, Sarlahi, a municipality in Sarlahi District, Province No. 2, Nepal
- Bagmati Province, Nepal
- Bagmati Rural Municipality (disambiguation)
  - Bagmati, Lalitpur, a rural municipality in Bagmati Pradesh, Nepal
  - Bagmati, Makwanpur, a rural municipality in Bagmati Province, Nepal
- Bagmati Zone, a former zone in Nepal

== See also ==
- Bhagmati (disambiguation)
