= Khairang =

Khairang may refer to:

- Khairang, Kosi, Nepal
- Khairang, Narayani, Nepal
