= Gogane =

Gogane may refer to:

- Gogane, Bhojpur, a village in Koshi Province, Nepal
- Gogane, Makwanpur, a village in Bagmati Province, Nepal
