= Bharta Punchedevi =

Village development committee in Narayani Zone, Nepal but now kailsh-7

Bharta Punchedevi भार्ता पञ्चदेवी
- Village development committee
- Country: Nepal
- Province: Bagmati Province
- District: Makwanpur District

Population (1991)
  - Total: 2,734
- Time zone: UTC+5:45 (Nepal Time)

Bharta Punchedevi is a village development committee in Makwanpur District in the Bagmati Province of Nepal. At the time of the 1991 Nepal census it had a population of 2734 people living in 495 individual households.
