= Chhatiwan, Makwanpur =

Coordinates: 27.333155°N 85.203175°E

Chhatiwan छतिवन
- Village development committee
- Location in Nepal
- Country: Nepal
- Province: Bagmati Province
- District: Makwanpur District
- Rural municipality: Bakaiya Rural Municipality

Population (1991)
  - Total: 28,392
- Time zone: UTC+5:45 (Nepal Time)

Chhatiwan is a village development committee in the Bakaiya Rural Municipality of Makwanpur District in the Bagmati Province of Nepal. At the time of the 1991 Nepal census it had a population of 15,392 people living in 2720 individual households.
