= Makawanpurgadhi Rural Municipality =

Makawanpurgadhi (RM) मकवानपुरगढी गाउँपालिका
- Rural Municipality
- Location Makawanpurgadhi (RM) (Nepal)
- Coordinates: 27.42°N 85.17°E
- Country: Nepal
- Province: Bagmati
- District: Makwanpur
- Wards: 8
- Established: 10 March 2017

Government
  - Type: Rural Council
  - Chairperson: Mr. Dorje Lama Syangtang
  - Vice-chairperson: Mrs. Mankumari Nepali Pakhrin
  - Term of office: (2023 - 2028)

Area
  - Total: 148.72 km^{2} (57.42 sq mi)

Population (2011)
  - Total: 25,322
  - Density: 170.27/km^{2} (440.99/sq mi)
- Time zone: UTC+5:45 (Nepal Standard Time)
- Headquarter: Makwanpurgadhi
- Website: makawanpurgadhimun.gov.np

Makawanpurgadhi is a Rural municipality located within the Makwanpur District of the Bagmati Province of Nepal. The rural municipality spans 148.72 square kilometres (57.42 sq mi) of area, with a total population of 25,322 according to the 2011 Nepal census.

On March 10, 2017, the Government of Nepal restructured the local level bodies into 753 new local level structures. The previous Makwanpurgadhi, Ambhanjyang, Sukaura and Budhichaur VDCs were merged to form Makawanpurgadhi Rural Municipality. Makawanpurgadhi is divided into 8 wards, with Makwanpurgadhi VDC declared the administrative center of the rural municipality.

== Demographics ==
At the time of the 2011 Nepal census, Makawanpurgadhi Rural Municipality had a population of 25,379. Of these, 58.7% spoke Tamang, 39.3% Nepali, 1.1% Magar, 0.4% Newar, 0.1% Gurung, 0.1% Maithili and 0.1% other languages as their first language.

In terms of ethnicity/caste, 59.4% were Tamang, 26.1% Hill Brahmin, 7.0% Chhetri, 2.3% Kami, 2.2% Magar, 1.4% Newar, 0.8% Damai/Dholi, 0.2% Gurung, 0.1% Chepang/Praja, 0.1% Sanyasi/Dasnami, 0.1% Sunuwar, 0.1% other Terai, 0.1% Thakuri and 0.2% others.

In terms of religion, 56.4% were Buddhist, 41.1% Hindu, 1.9% Christian and 0.6% others.

In terms of literacy, 69.1% could read and write, 2.5% could only read and 28.3% could neither read nor write.
