= Ambhanjyang =

Place in Nepal

Ambhanjyang आमभन्ज्याङ
- Village development committee
- Location in Nepal
- Coordinates: 27.45°N 85.10°E
- Country: Nepal
- Province: Bagmati Province
- District: Makwanpur District
- Rural municipality: Makawanpurgadhi Rural Municipality

Population (1991)
  - Total: 6,562
- Time zone: UTC+5:45 (Nepal Time)

Ambhanjyang (Nepali: आमभन्ज्याङ) is a village development committee in the Makawanpurgadhi Rural Municipality of Makwanpur District in the Bagmati Province of southern Nepal. At the time of the 1991 Nepal census it had a population of 6562 people living in 1159 individual households.
