= Dandakharka, Makwanpur =

Dandakharka डाँडाखर्क
- Village development committee
- Location in Nepal
- Coordinates: 27.65°N 84.92°E
- Country: Nepal
- Province: Bagmati Province
- District: Makwanpur District
- Rural municipality: Kailash Rural Municipality

Population (1991)
  - Total: 3,541
- Time zone: UTC+5:45 (Nepal Time)

Dandakharka is a village development committee in the Kailash Rural Municipality of Makwanpur District in the Bagmati Province of Nepal. At the time of the 1991 Nepal census it had a population of 3541 people living in 609 individual households.
