= Handikhola =

Handikhola हाँडिखोला
- Village development committee
- Location in Nepal
- Coordinates: 27.43°N 84.89°E
- Country: Nepal
- Province: Bagmati Province
- District: Makwanpur District
- Rural municipality: Manahari Rural Municipality

Population (2011)
  - Total: 18,415
- Time zone: UTC+5:45 (Nepal Time)

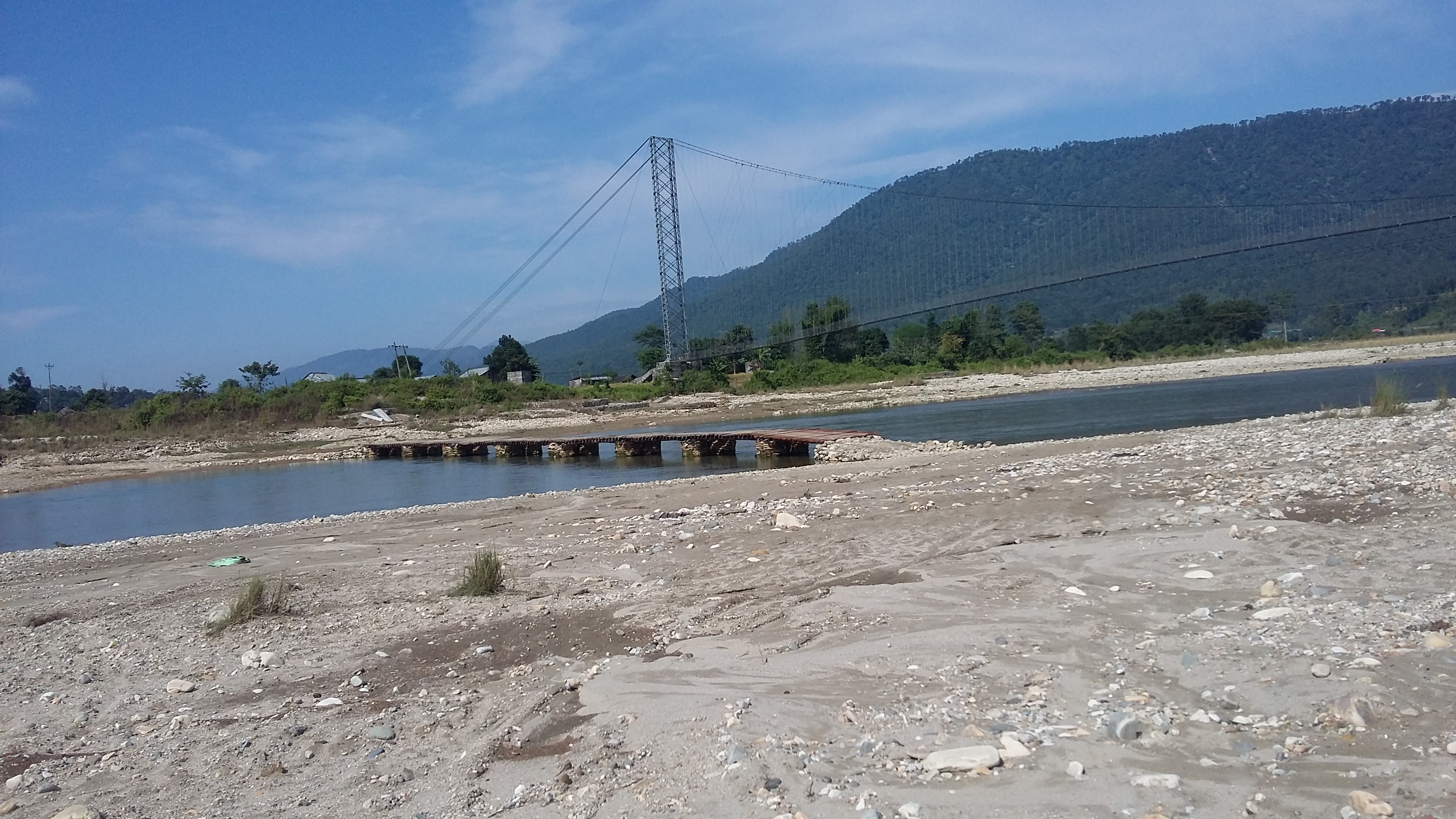
Handikhola, Nepal

Handikhola is a village in the Manahari Rural Municipality of Makwanpur District in the Bagmati Province of Nepal. At the time of the 2011 Nepal census it had a population of 24,662 people living in 3,975 individual households.
