= Markhu =

Markhu मार्खु
- Village development committee
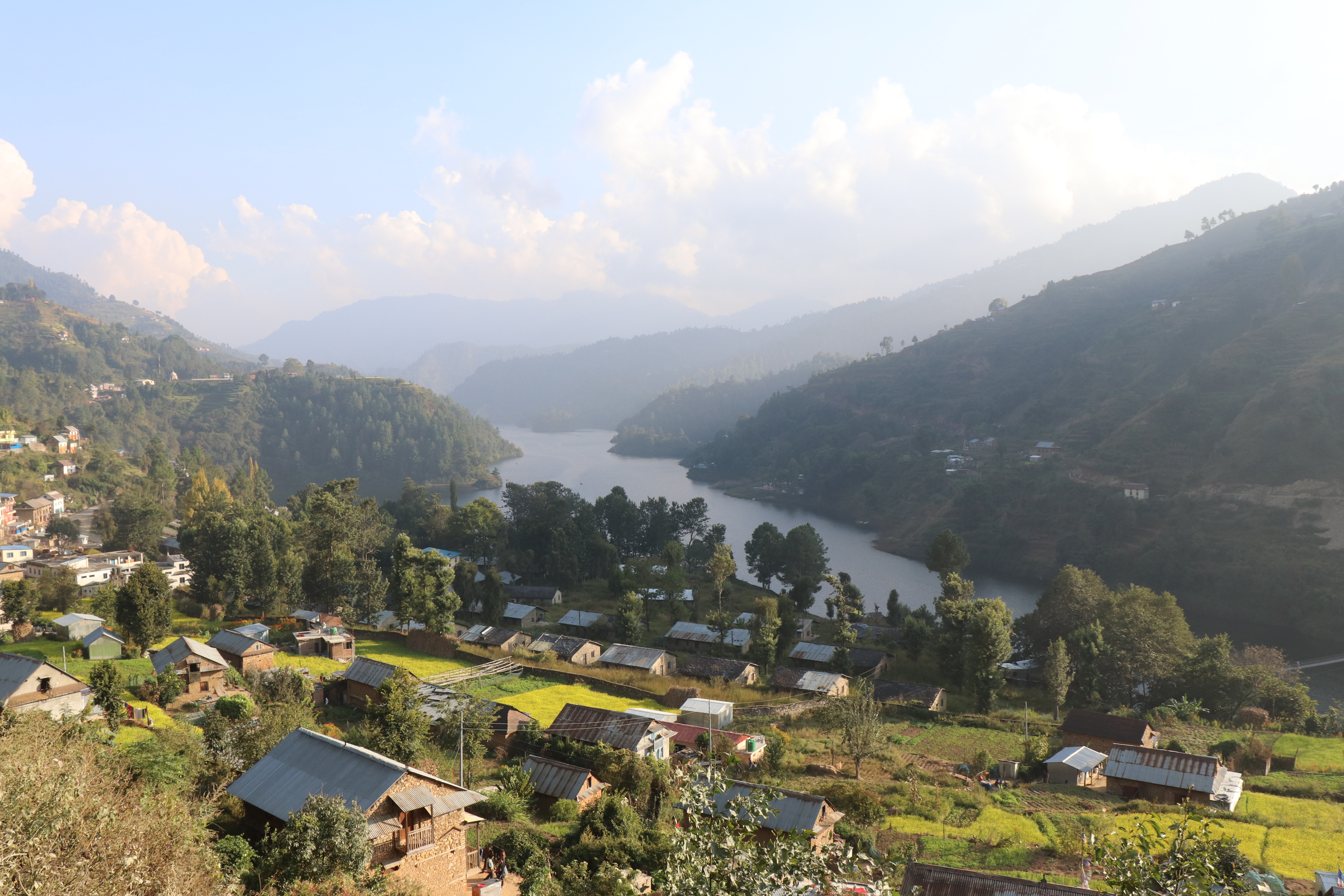
- View of Markhu Village

- Location in Nepal
- Coordinates: 27.61°N 85.17°E
- Country: Nepal
- Province: Bagmati Province
- District: Makwanpur District
- Rural municipality: Indrasarowar Rural Municipality

Population (1991)
  - Total: 3,137
- Time zone: UTC+5:45 (Nepal Time)

Markhu is a village in the Indrasarowar Rural Municipality of Makwanpur District in the Bagmati Province of Nepal. At the time of the 1991 Nepal census it had a population of 3137 people living in 581 individual households.

Formerly, Markhu was a village development committee (VDC), which were local-level administrative units. In 2017, the government of Nepal restructured local government in line with the 2015 constitution and VDCs were discontinued.
