= Basamadi =

Basamadi बसामाडी
- Location in Nepal
- Coordinates: 27.48°N 84.95°E
- Country: Nepal
- Province: Bagmati Province
- District: Makwanpur District
- Submetropolitan city: Hetauda

Population (1991)
  - Total: 10,232
- Time zone: UTC+5:45 (Nepal Time)

Basamadi is a part of Hetauda Submetropolitan City of Makwanpur District in the Bagmati Province of Nepal. At the time of the 1991 Nepal census it had a population of 10,232 people living in 1815 individual households.

== Description ==
Basamadi is located at about seven kilometers from Hetauda city. The name originates from the temple of basaha mahadeva. It is mostly recognisable by the multinational company Unilever which has a branch here. The Mahendra Highway runs through Basamadi.

Basamadi is composed of various types of people including brahmins, magar, chhetri, rai etc. The hilly sides are mostly populated by rai, tamang people. <Description/>

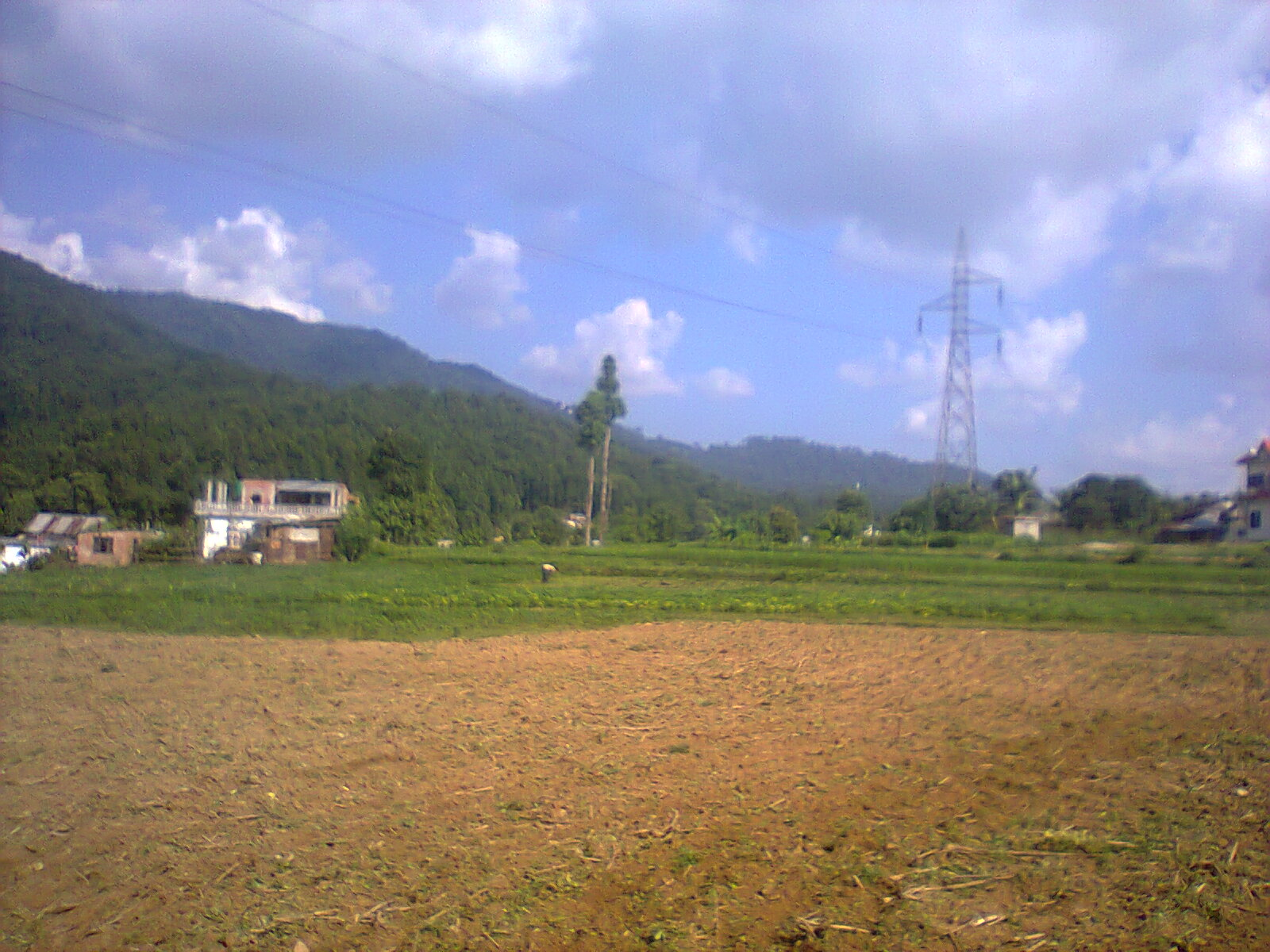

== Education ==
these schools are situated here

1.Shree Mahendra kiran Higher Secondary school

2. Shiksha Bikas Shishu Sadan

3. Sunshine English boarding school <Education/>
