= Agara, Makwanpur =

Place in Nepal

Agara आगरा
- Village development committee
- Location in Nepal
- Coordinates: 27.68°N 85.02°E
- Country: Nepal
- Zone: Bagmati Province
- District: Makwanpur District

Population (1991)
  - Total: 6,839
- Time zone: UTC+5:45 (Nepal Time)

Agara (Nepali: आगरा) is a village development committee in Makwanpur District in the Bagmati Province of southern Nepal. At the time of the 1991 Nepal census it had a population of 6839 people living in 1252 individual households.

== Demographics ==
At the time of the 2011 Nepal census, Agara VDC had a population of 7,836. Of these, 64.4% spoke Tamang, 35.3% Nepali, 0.2% Maithili and 0.2% other languages as their first language.

In terms of ethnicity/caste, 64.6% were Tamang, 21.4% Chhetri, 3.4% Hill Brahmin, 2.3% Magar, 2.1% Kami, 1.3% Damai/Dholi, 0.8% Gurung, 0.5% Sanyasi/Dasnami, 0.2% Sarki and 0.3% others.
