= Agni Air Flight 101 =

2010 aviation accident in Nepal

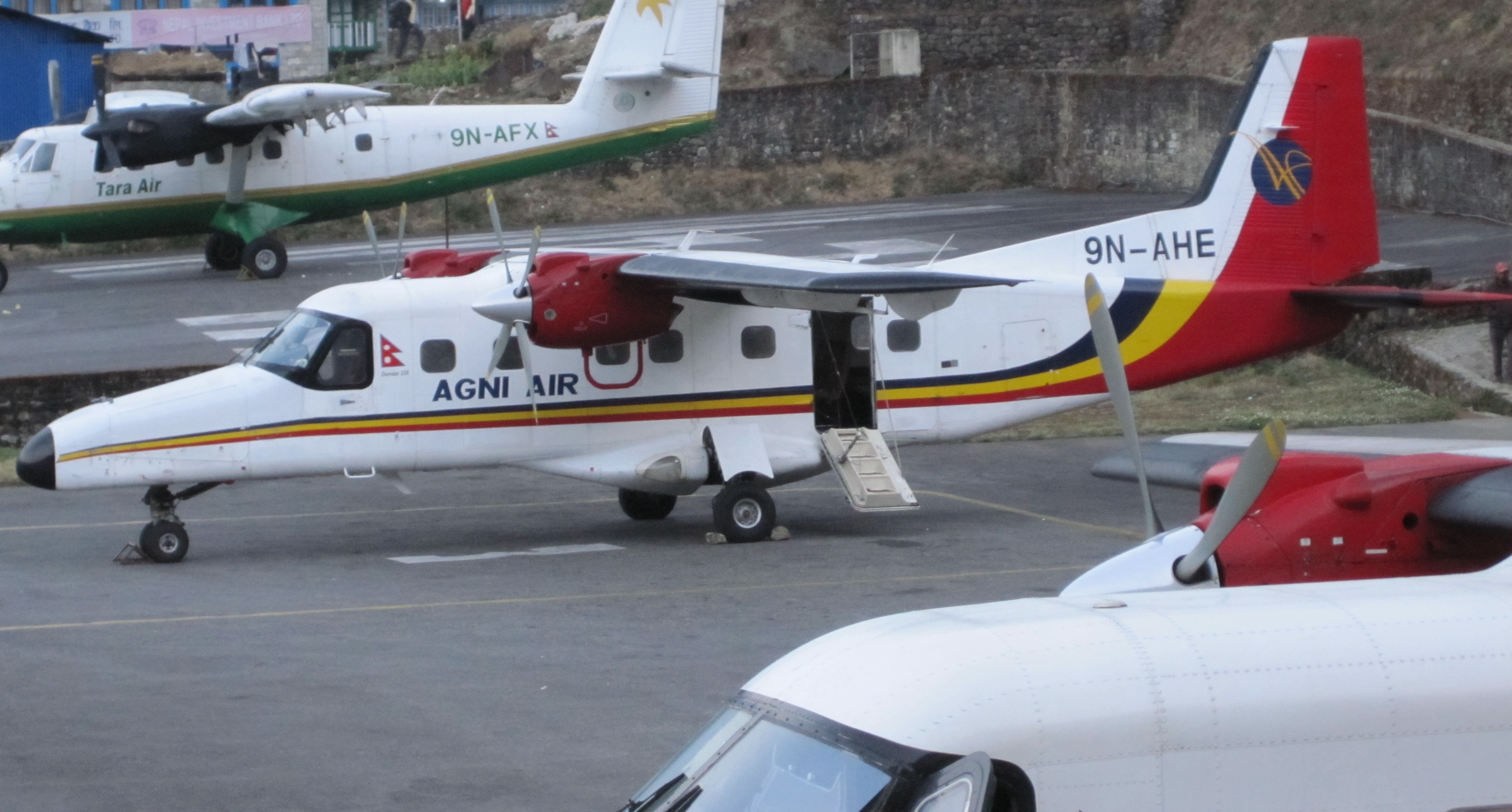
- 9N-AHE, the aircraft involved in the accident, seen in April 2010

Accident
- Date: 24 August 2010
- Summary: Crashed following electrical failure and spatial disorientation
- Site: near Shikharpur, Nepal; 27°23′24″N 85°18′00″E

Aircraft
- Aircraft type: Dornier 228-101
- Operator: Agni Air
- IATA flight No.: AG101
- Call sign: AGNI 101
- Registration: 9N-AHE
- Flight origin: Tribhuvan International Airport, Kathmandu, Nepal
- Destination: Tenzing-Hillary Airport, Lukla, Nepal
- Occupants: 14
- Passengers: 11
- Crew: 3
- Fatalities: 14
- Survivors: 0

Agni Air Flight 101 was a regional flight between Kathmandu and Lukla, Nepal, that crashed on 24 August 2010, killing all 14 people on board. Twenty minutes after take-off, the flight crew of the Dornier 228 had reported a technical problem. Contact with the aircraft was lost shortly after. The aircraft crashed 50 miles (80 km) south of Kathmandu.

The investigation into the accident found that pilot fell victim to spatial disorientation following the loss of flight instruments after both generators failed. Backup battery power was exhausted prematurely due to the crew using an outdated checklist.

== History of the flight ==
Flight 101 was traveling on a flight between Tribhuvan International Airport in Kathmandu, Nepal, and Tenzing-Hillary Airport in Lukla, Nepal. Twenty minutes after take-off, the crew of the aircraft contacted air traffic control reporting technical problems and requesting a return to Kathmandu.

Controllers then diverted the aircraft to Simara Airport in Pipara Simara, Nepal, due to poor weather conditions at Kathmandu. Aviation officials said although the flight crew reported technical problems, they did not declare an emergency or request priority clearance to land.

Five minutes after reporting technical problems, radar and radio contact with the aircraft was lost. The aircraft crashed in the town of Shikharpur, Narayani, around 50 miles (80 km) south of Kathmandu. Witnesses reported there was no noise from the engines prior to the crash. The force of the crash spread wreckage in an area with a diameter of around 330 feet (100 m); and the aircraft created a crater 3 metres (9.8 ft) deep upon crashing.

== Aircraft ==
The aircraft involved was a twin turboprop Dornier 228 bearing Nepalese registration 9N-AHE. It was built by Dornier Flugzeugwerke in 1984 and was operated by Skyline Airways before being purchased by Agni Air in 2006.

== Casualties ==
All on board died in the crash; they included eight Nepalese citizens, as well as six foreigners. Of the foreigners, four were American women, one was a Briton, and one was Japanese.

Nationality	Fatalities		Total
Nationality	Passengers	Crew	Total
Nepal	5	3	8
United States	4	0	4
Japan	1	0	1
United Kingdom	1	0	1
Total	11	3	14

== Aftermath ==
Rescue operations were immediately undertaken after it became clear that the plane had crashed, although efforts were hampered by the fact that the crash site was around two hours away from the closest location of police forces. Heavy rains in the area also led to the risk of flooding and landslides. Personnel from the Nepalese Army reached the site of the crash on foot, and were responsible for gathering bodies, but due to weather conditions, helicopters were forced to land more than a mile away. Authorities announced a reward of Rs. 50,000 for anyone who would find equipment that would help authorities discover the cause of the crash. By 2 September, both the cockpit voice recorder and the flight data recorder of the crashed aircraft had been located; both were undamaged and were analysed by investigators in India.

== Investigation ==
The government of Nepal formed a five-member panel to help determine the cause of the crash; the committee was instructed to submit a report on the crash within 65 days.

Despite initial reports that technical issues had resulted in the accident, the cause was found to be spatial disorientation of the pilot following the loss of the attitude indicator. Flying in poor weather, that is in instrument meteorological conditions, the flight crew would have had to rely only on their instruments. The failure of the attitude indicator was caused by the failure of both generators and the crew using an outdated checklist. The battery was therefore drained of power in less than half the normal discharge time.

== See also ==
- 2012 Agni Air Dornier 228 crash
- Yeti Airlines Flight 101
