= Makwanpurgadhi =

Makwanpurgadhi मकवानपुरगढी
- Village development committee
- Location in Nepal
- Coordinates: 27.42°N 85.17°E
- Country: Nepal
- Province: Bagmati Province
- District: Makwanpur District
- Rural municipality: Makawanpurgadhi Rural Municipality

Population (1991)
  - Total: 10,300
- Time zone: UTC+5:45 (Nepal Time)

Makwanpurgadhi or Makwanpur Gadhi (literally Makwanpur Fort) is a village development committee in the Makawanpurgadhi Rural Municipality of Makwanpur District in the Bagmati Province of southern Nepal. At the time of the 2011 Nepal census it had a population of 14996 people living in 2588 individual households.

The Makwanpur Gadhi, which lies in about 17 kilometers north from Hetauda is the great achievement of the Sen dynasty. Before the unification of Nepal “The Sen/Sheng dynasty” ruled over Makwanpur until 1819 B.S. Then ruler of Palpa “Mani Mukunda Sen” divided his huge state into four parts among his four sons and so Makwanpur came under his youngest son “Lohang Sen”.

Another king of the same regime “Tula Sen” constructed the Makwanpur gadhi during his ruling period. Later on his grand daughter, Indra Kumari was married to King Prithivi Narayan Shah of Gorkha State, who annexed Makwanpur to Gorkha in 1819.

There are two castles in the fort, one is called the “Mool Gadhi” (the main fort) and other is “Sanno Gadhi” (the small fort). About 35 years ago, there was a palace called “Jungey Darbar”, which had its own supernatural beauty and it was an important belonging of the “Sen Dynasty”. But instead of conserving the historical monument, the later Sen king used the palace (Jungey Darbar) for their personal uses. Having historical and cultural importance, The Makwanpur Fort is a very precious wealth of Makwanpur district. 25 feet high and 7 feet wide wall surround the fort. There is a 10 feet deep canal, which was constructed in order to protect themselves from the enemies.

In order to protect the fort, some soldiers were in duty but now there is no any soldier and many of the monuments had been lost. Among those the heart of this gadhi The Lord krishna which had been called by the name bangashagopal was robbed.
