= Thingan, Nepal =

Thingan ठिंगन
- Village development committee
- Location in Nepal
- Coordinates: 27.43°N 85.25°E
- Country: Nepal
- Province: Bagmati Province
- District: Makwanpur District
- Rural municipality: Bakaiya Rural Municipality

Population (1991)
  - Total: 3,304
- Time zone: UTC+5:45 (Nepal Time)

Thingan is a village development committee in the Bakaiya Rural Municipality of Makwanpur District in the Bagmati Province of Nepal. At the 1991 Nepal census it had a population of 3,304 people living in 554 individual households.
