= Raigaun =

Raigaun राईगाउँ
- Village development committee
- Location in Nepal
- Coordinates: 27.21°N 85.48°E
- Country: Nepal
- Province: Bagmati Province
- District: Makwanpur District
- Rural municipality: Bagmati Rural Municipality

Population (1991)
  - Total: 9,012
- Time zone: UTC+5:45 (Nepal Time)

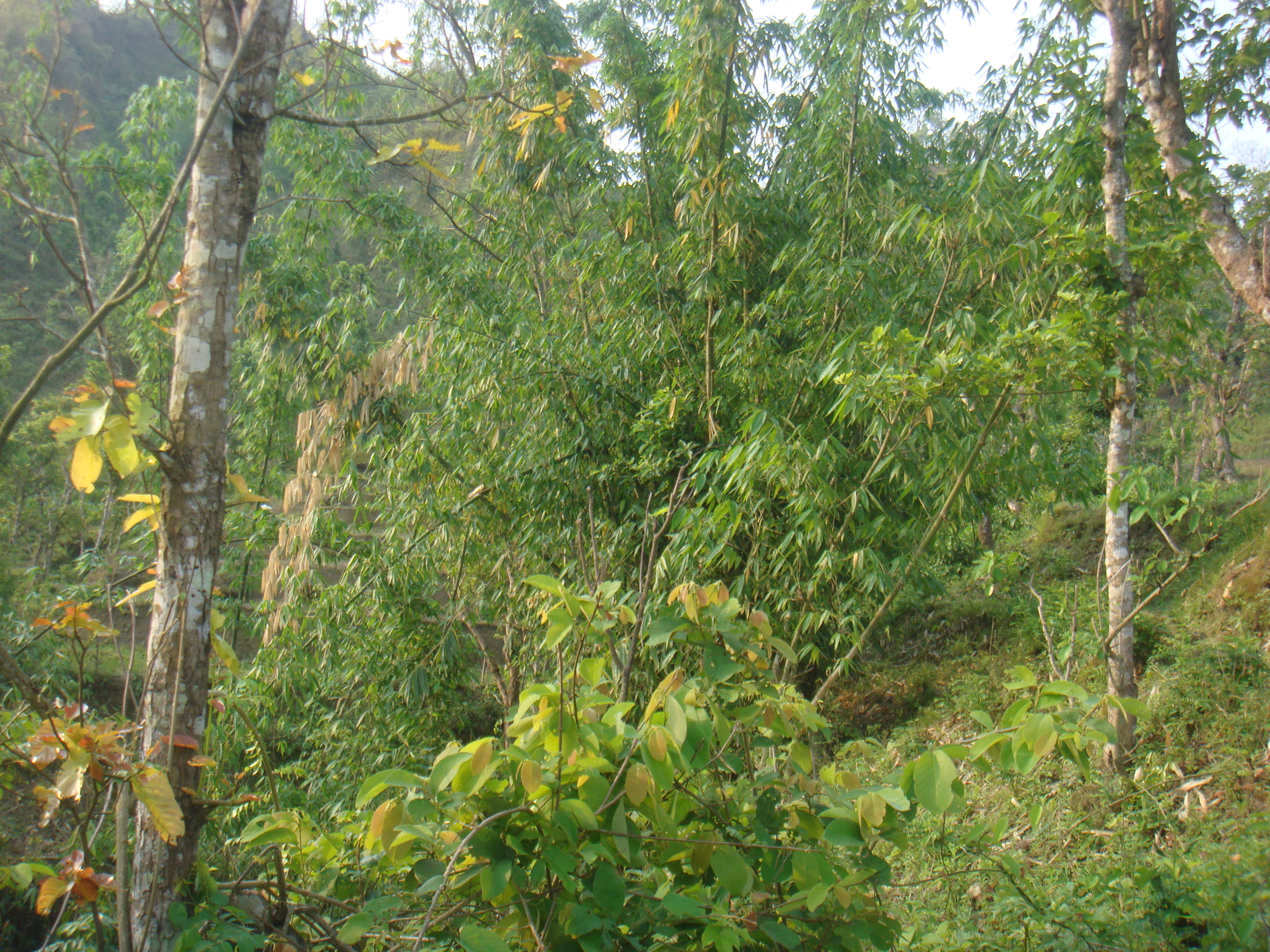

Raigaun is a village in the Bagmati Rural Municipality of Makwanpur District in Bagmati Province. It was a part of a village development committee in Narayani Zone of southern Nepal. At the time of the 1991 Nepal census it had a population of 9012 people living in 1468 individual households.
