= Kailash Rural Municipality =

Kailash (RM) कैलाश गाउँपालिका
- Rural Municipality
- Location Kailash (RM) (Nepal)
- Coordinates: 27°35′16″N 84°55′15″E
- Country: Nepal
- Province: Bagmati
- District: Makwanpur
- Wards: 10
- Established: 10 March 2017

Government
  - Type: Rural Council
  - Chairperson: Mr. Tank Bahadur Muktan (CPN (US))
  - Vice-chairperson: Mrs. Sukumaya Thing

Area
  - Total: 204.48 km^{2} (78.95 sq mi)

Population (2011)
  - Total: 23,922
  - Density: 116.99/km^{2} (303.00/sq mi)
- Time zone: UTC+5:45 (Nepal Standard Time)
- Headquarter: Kalikatar
- Website: kailashmun.gov.np

Kailash is a Rural municipality located within the Makwanpur District of the Bagmati Province of Nepal. The municipality spans 204.48 square kilometres (78.95 sq mi) of area, with a total population of 23,922 according to the 2011 Nepal census.

On March 10, 2017, the Government of Nepal restructured the local level bodies into 753 new local level structures. The previous Dandakharka, Kalikatar, Gagane, Bharta Pundyadevi and Namtar VDCs were merged to form Kailash Rural Municipality. Kailash is divided into 10 wards, with Kalikatar declared the administrative center of the rural municipality.

== Demographics ==
At the time of the 2011 Nepal census, Kailash Rural Municipality had a population of 23,922. Of these, 67.0% spoke Tamang, 16.2% Nepali, 14.4% Chepang, 1.5% Gurung, 0.4% Magar, 0.1% Bhojpuri, 0.1% Maithili, 0.1% Newar and 0.1% other languages as their first language.

In terms of ethnicity/caste, 67.1% were Tamang, 16.9% Chepang/Praja, 4.6% Chhetri, 2.6% Kami, 2.4% Magar, 2.1% Gurung, 1.4% Hill Brahmin, 0.7% Damai/Dholi, 0.5% Gharti/Bhujel, 0.4% Newar, 0.4% Sanyasi/Dasnami, 0.2% other Dalit, 0.2% Thakuri, 0.1% Yadav and 0.3% others.

In terms of religion, 67.4% were Buddhist, 22.9% Hindu, 7.5% Christian, 2.1% Prakriti and 0.1% others.

In terms of literacy, 50.9% could read and write, 3.7% could only read and 45.3% could neither read nor write.
