= Kulekhani Reservoir =

Dam in Kulekhani, Makwanpur District, Narayani Zone

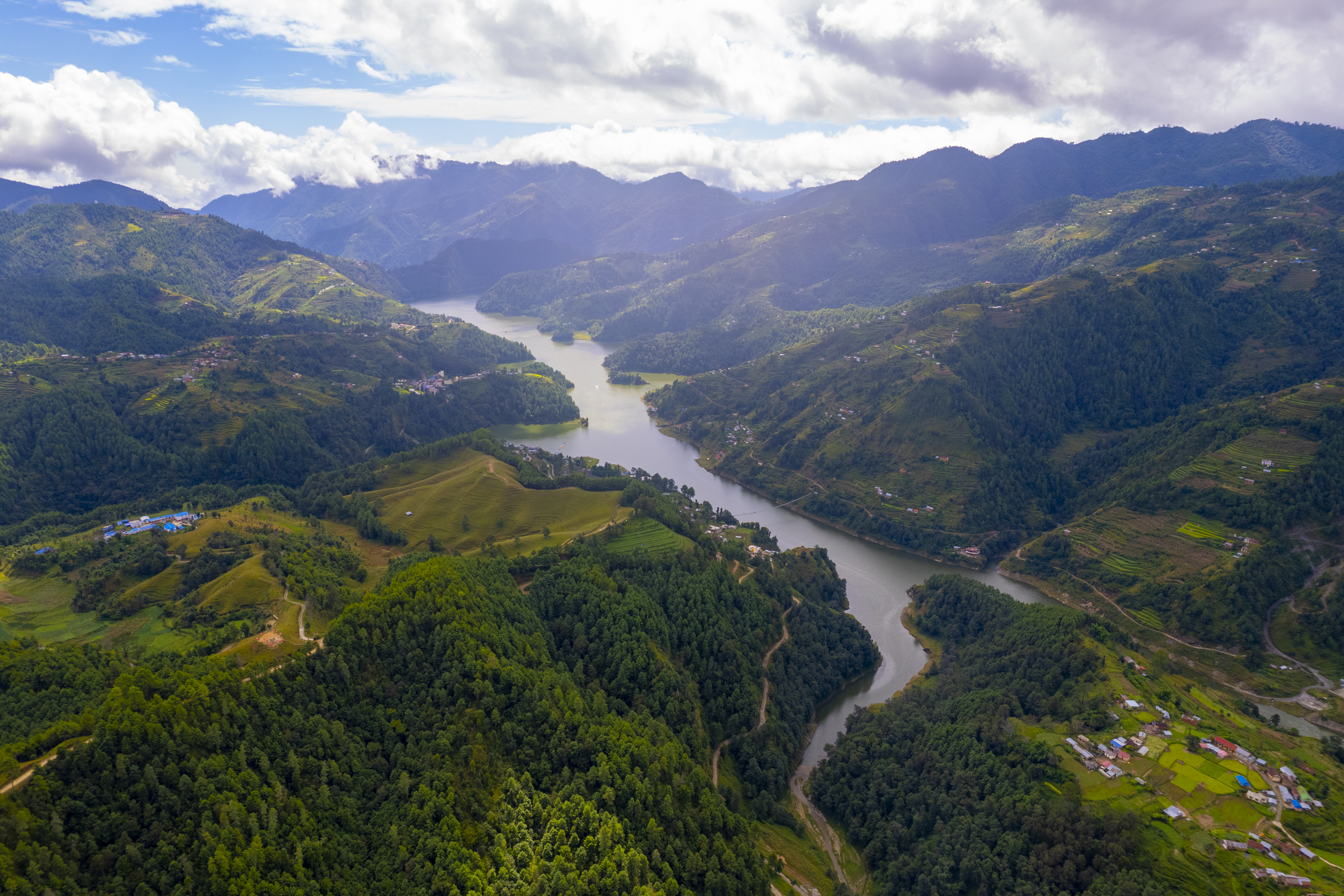
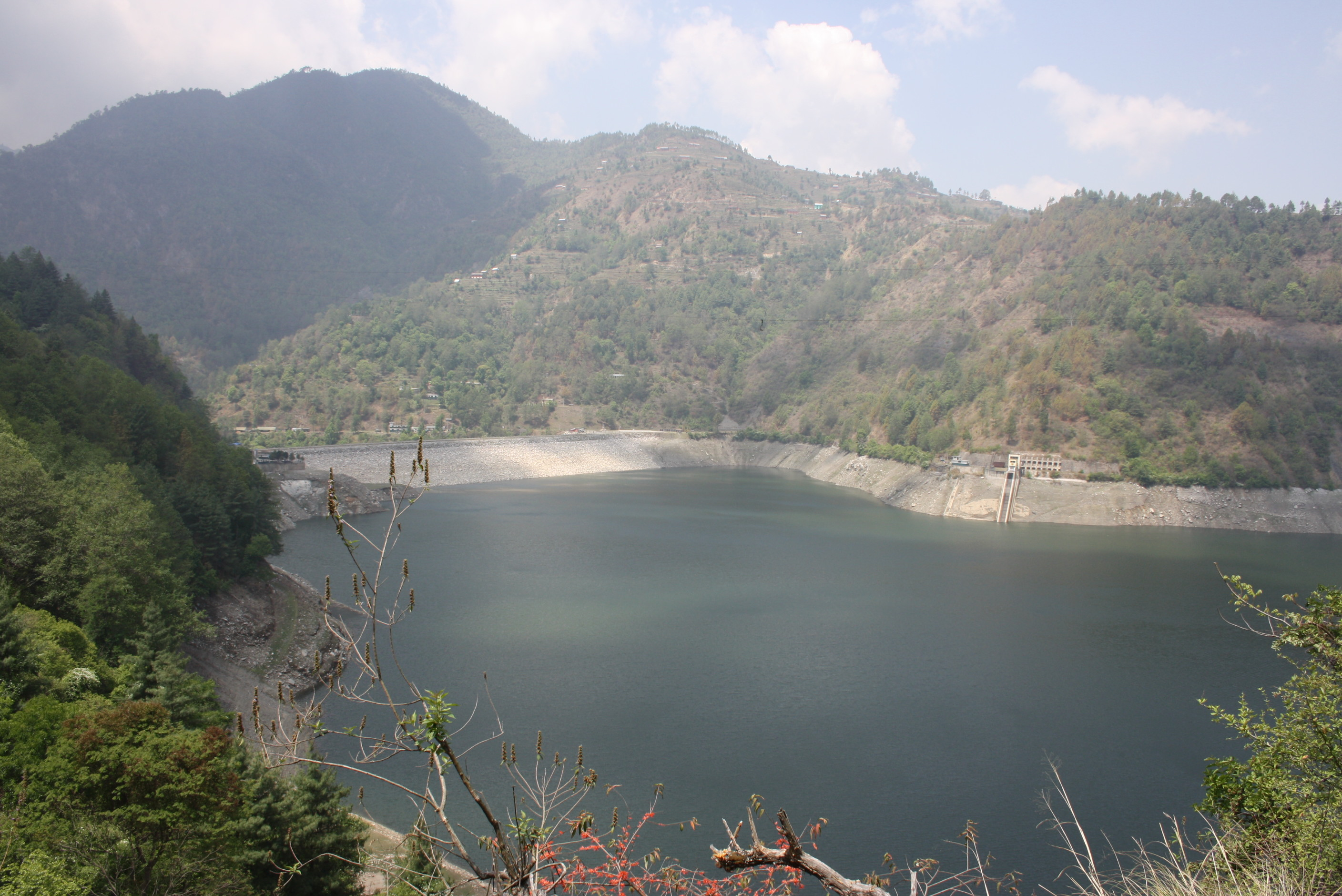
- Aerial view of Indra Sarobar reservoir Kulekhani dam also known as "Indra Sarobar", Makwanpur, Nepal

- Location within Nepal
- Interactive map of Kulekhani Reservoir
- Country: Nepal
- Location: Kulekhani, Indrasarowar Rural Municipality, Makwanpur District, Bagmati Province
- Coordinates: 27°35′25″N 85°9′21″E
- Purpose: Power
- Status: Operational
- Construction began: 1977
- Opening date: 1982; 44 years ago
- Construction cost: US$117.84 million
- Owner: Nepal Electricity Authority

Dam and spillways
- Type of dam: Embankment, rock-fill
- Impounds: Kulekhani River
- Height: 114 m (374 ft)
- Length: 397 m (1,302 ft)
- Elevation at crest: 1,534 m (5,033 ft)
- Width (crest): 10 m (33 ft)
- Dam volume: 4,400,000 m^{3} (5,800,000 cu yd)

Reservoir
- Creates: Kulekhani Reservoir (Indra Sarobar)
- Total capacity: 85,300,000 m^{3} (69,200 acre⋅ft)
- Active capacity: 73,300,000 m^{3} (59,400 acre⋅ft)
- Inactive capacity: 12,000,000 m^{3} (9,700 acre⋅ft)
- Catchment area: 126 km^{2} (49 mi^{2})
- Surface area: 2.2 km^{2} (0.85 mi^{2})
- Maximum length: 7 km (4.3 mi)
- Normal elevation: 1,530 m (5,020 ft)

Kulekhani-I Hydropower Station
- Coordinates: 27°32′24.81″N 85°6′48.82″E
- Commission date: Kulekhani I: 1982; Kulekhani II: 1986; Kulekhani III: 2019
- Type: Conventional, diversion
- Hydraulic head: Kulekhani I: 550 m (1,800 ft); Kulekhani II: 284.1 m (932 ft); Kulekhani III: 102.56 m (336.5 ft)
- Turbines: Kulekhani I: 2 x 30 MW Pelton-type; Kulekhani II: 2 x 16 MW Francis-type; Kulekhani III: 2 x 7 MW Francis-type
- Installed capacity: Kulekhani I: 60 MW; Kulekhani II: 32 MW; Kulekhani III: 14 MW (est.); Total: 106 MW
- Annual generation: Kulekhani I: 211 GWh; Kulekhani II: 104.6 GWh; Kulekhani III: 40.85 GWh (commissioned in 2019)

The Kulekhani Dam is a rock-fill dam on the Kulekhani River near Kulekhani in the Indrasarowar Rural Municipality of Makwanpur District in Bagmati Province, Nepal. The primary purpose of the dam is hydroelectric power generation and it supports the 60 MW Kulekhani I, 32 MW Kulekhani II and 14 MW Kulekhani III Hydropower Stations. Construction began in 1977 and Kulekhani I was commissioned in 1982. Kulekhani II was commissioned in 1986 and a third power station, the 14 MW Kulekhani III was expected to be commissioned in May 2015 but was delayed due to issues with the builder. The US$117.84 million project received funding from the World Bank, Kuwait Fund, UNDP, Overseas Economic Cooperation Fund and OPEC Fund. It is owned by Nepal Electricity Authority.

The 114 m (374 ft) tall dam creates a reservoir called Indra Sarobar which stores 85,300,000 m^{3} (69,200 acre⋅ft) of water.

The Kulekhani Dam in Nepal has a total installed capacity of 106 megawatts (MW):

- Kulekhani I: 60 MW installed capacity
- Kulekhani II: 32 MW installed capacity
- Kulekhani III: 14 MW installed capacity

== Kulekhani I hydropower station ==
From the reservoir, water is sent to the Kulekhani I Hydropower Station via a 5.8 km (3.6 mi) headrace tunnel to a gate house which controls the flow of water to the power station. From the gate house water travels down a 1,340 m (4,400 ft) long penstock where it reaches the underground power station. It contains two 30 MW Pelton turbine-generators. The difference in elevation between the reservoir and the power station affords a net hydraulic head of 550 m (1,800 ft).

== Kulekhani II hydropower station ==
Water discharged from the Kulekhani I power station enters a series of tunnels and diversions where it reaches the Kulekhani II Hydropower Station which is also located underground and contains two 16 MW Francis turbine-generators. The elevation difference between the reservoir and the power station affords a net hydraulic head of 284.1 m (932 ft). The dam and reservoir are in the Bagmati River basin while the power stations are in the Rapti River basin.

== Kulekhani III hydropower station ==
Construction of the Kulekhani III Hydropower Station had been underway since 2008 and was completed in 2019. The Nepal Electricity Authority (NEA) had extended the completion deadline of the Kulekhani 3 Hydropower Project for the fifth time to January 2018 as construction was running late due to its slowpoke contractor. The project’s civil contractor Sino Hydro has completed 100 percent of the construction, and there has been full progress in the installation of the turbine, water gate and transmission lines to evacuate the electricity generated by the plant. It will use the tailwaters of Kulekhani II and have an installed capacity of 14 MW.

== Gallery ==
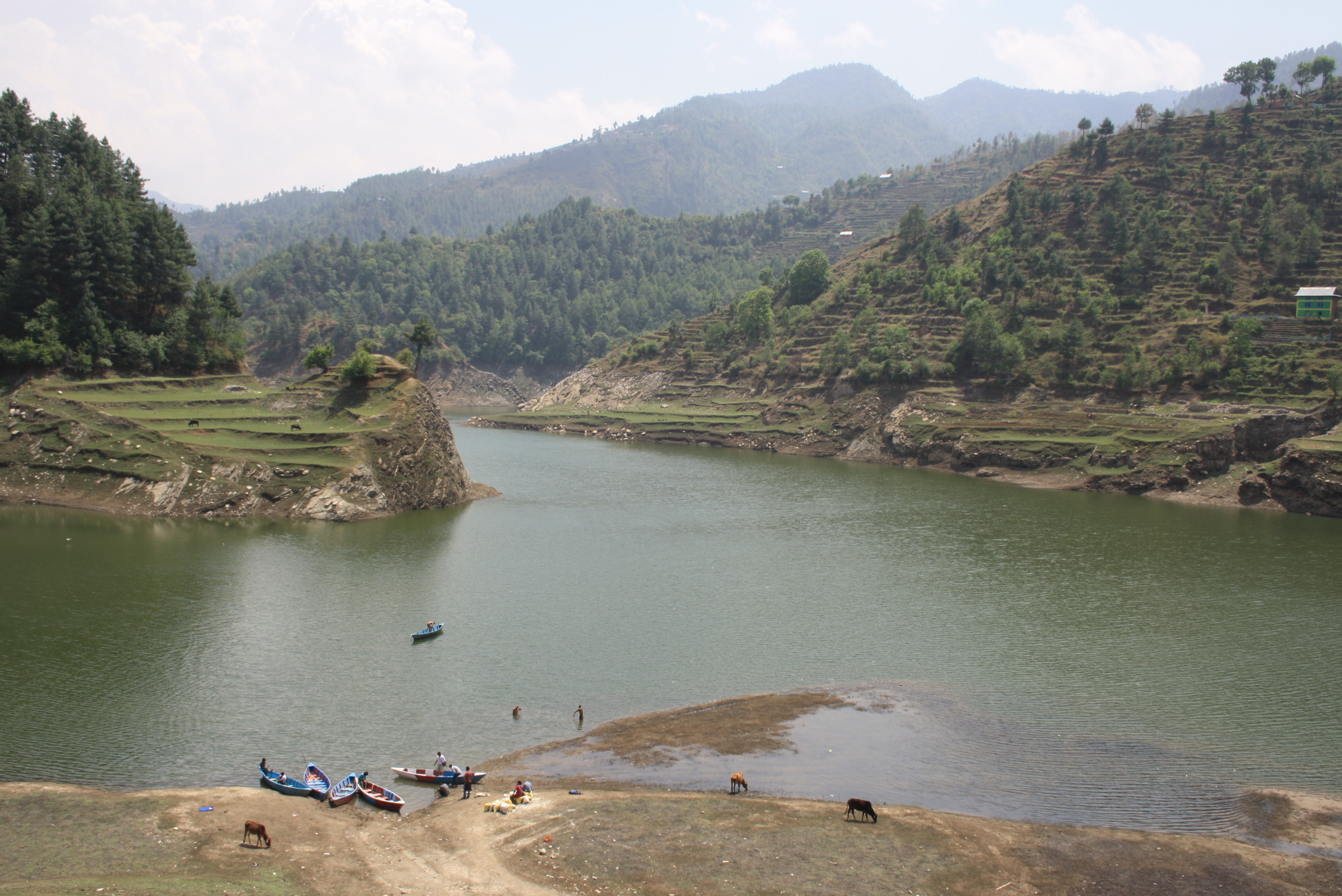
Group of fishermen with their boats by the Kulekhani reservoir.

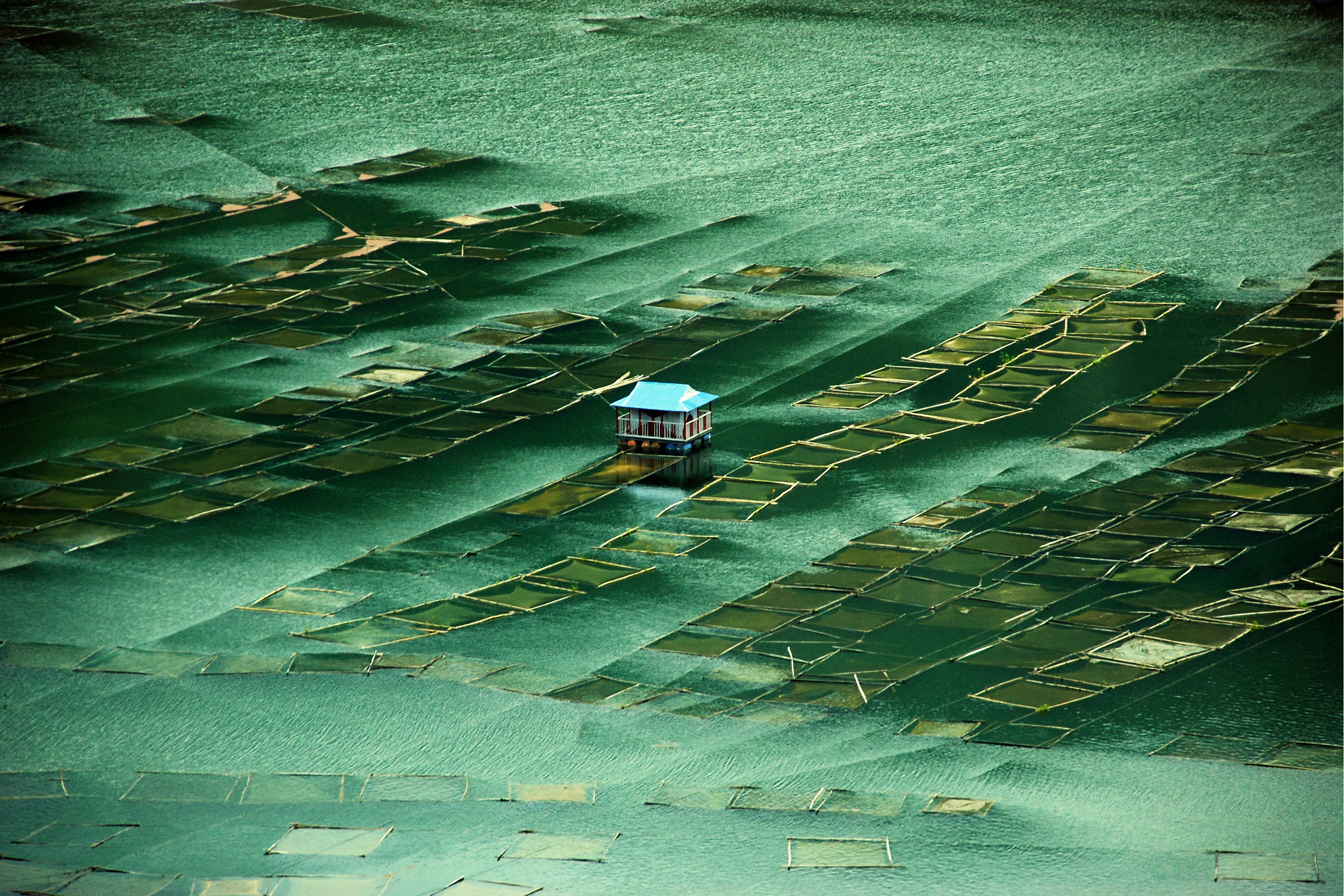
Fishing nets and a lonely fisherman's station at Indrasarovar lake, Kulekhani.

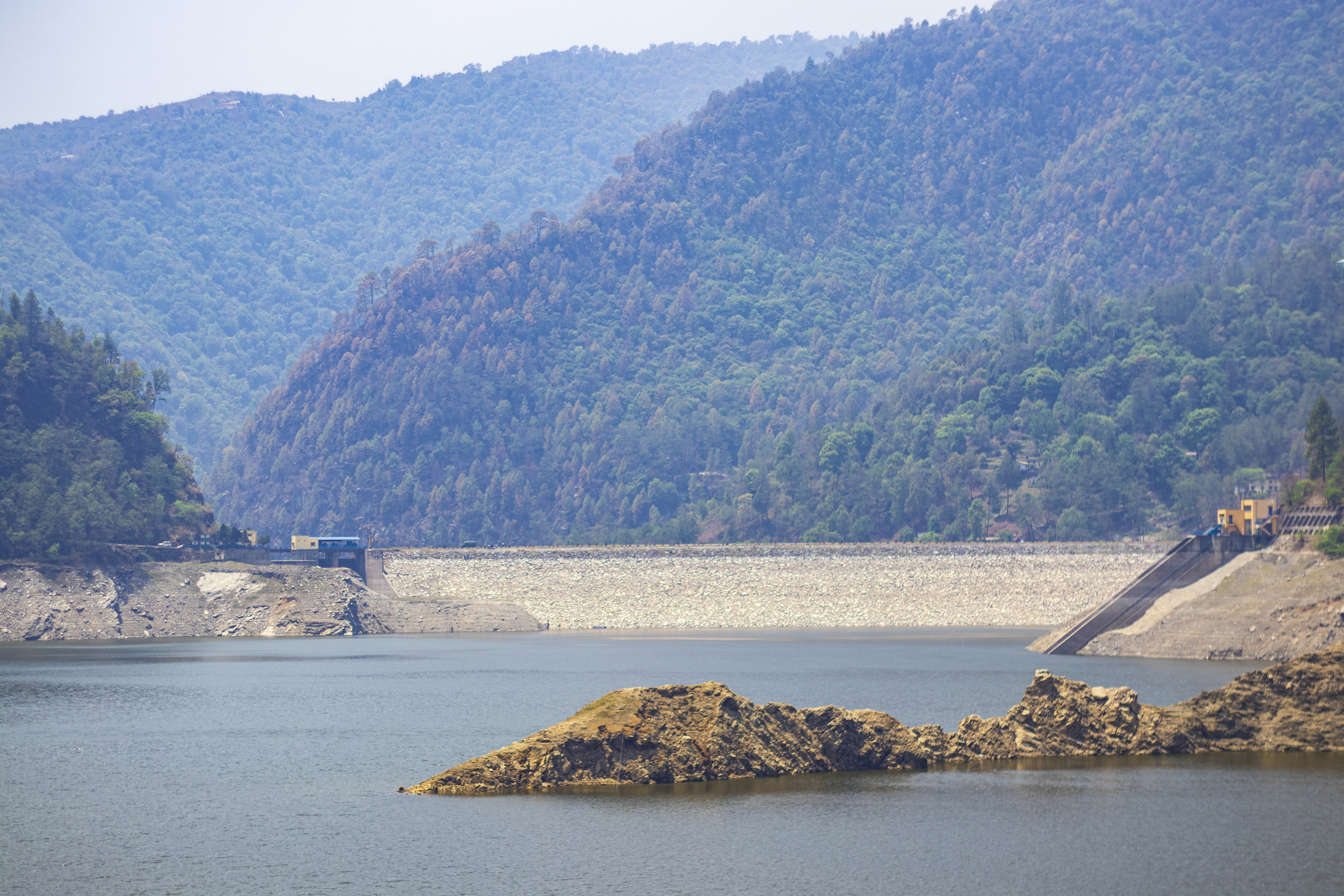
Wall of Kulekhani dam
