= Dhimal, Nepal =

Dhiyal धियाल
- Village development committee
- Location in Nepal
- Coordinates: 27.26°N 85.32°E
- Country: Nepal
- Province: Bagmati Province
- District: Makwanpur District
- Rural municipality: Bakaiya Rural Municipality

Population (1991)
  - Total: 4,568
- Time zone: UTC+5:45 (Nepal Time)

Dhiyal is a village development committee in the Bakaiya Rural Municipality of Makwanpur District in the Bagmati Province of Nepal. At the time of the 1991 Nepal census it had a population of 4568 people living in 742 individual households.
