= Namtar, Nepal =

Namtar नामटार
- Village development committee
- Location in Nepal
- Coordinates: 27.57°N 85.02°E
- Country: Nepal
- Province: Bagmati Province
- District: Makwanpur District
- Rural municipality: Kailash Rural Municipality

Population (1991)
  - Total: 7,999
- Time zone: UTC+5:45 (Nepal Time)

Namtar is a village development committee in the Kailash Rural Municipality of Makwanpur District in the Bagmati Province of Nepal. At the time of the 1991 Nepal census it had a population of 7999 people living in 1331 individual households. There are nine wads in Namtar they are Ghirgari todke, Batase, Nimtilek, Bardeu, Aghor,
