= Bhagmati – The Queen of Fortunes =

- poster
- Directed by: Ashok Kaul
- Written by: Ashok Kaul
- Starring: Tabu; Milind Soman
- Cinematography: Sameer Arya; Peter Pereira; Thomas A. Xavier
- Music by: Vishal Bhardwaj
- Production company: Zee Telefilms
- Release date: 26 August 2005
- Running time: 160 minutes
- Country: India
- Language: Hindi

Bhagmati – The Queen of Fortunes is a 2005 Indian Hindi-language partly-animation film written and directed by Ashok Kaul, and it is the first Indian film which is almost two-thirds animated, with "live actors" doing the rest. The film is based on the love story between Prince Mohammad Quli Qutb Shah of Hyderabad and Bhagmati.

At 2 hours and 40 minutes, the film was billed as "the world's longest animated film that also has living characters".

== Cast ==
- Tabu as Shivaranjani/Bhagmati
- Milind Soman as Aseem/Mohammad Quli Qutb Shah
- Ashok Kaul as Professor Bhanupratap
- J. V. Somayajulu
- Mahima Chaudhry (voice)
- Hema Malini (cameo)

== Production ==
The live-action parts of the film were shot in Hyderabad and some other parts of Andhra Pradesh.

== Soundtrack ==
1. "Alvida" – Suresh Wadkar, Sadhana Sargam
2. "Falsafi O Falsafi" – Ravindra Jain
3. "Ishq Abhi Tak Zinda Hai" – Farid Sabri, Vinod Sehgal
4. "Jiya Jaye Amma" – Asha Bhosle, Roop Kumar Rathod
5. "Kaise Kahan Kab Ho Gaya" – Suresh Wadkar
6. "Meri Jaan Meri Jaan Meri Jaan Meri Jaan" – Rekha Bhardwaj
7. "Prem Diwani" – Asha Bhosle
8. "Suraj Ki Aag Mein" – Roop Kumar Rathod, Sujatha Mohan

== Reception ==
Taran Adarsh of Bollywood Hungama rated the film one out of five stars and wrote, "On the whole, BHAGGMATI - THE QUEEN OF FORTUNES is a poor show".

== See also ==
- List of Indian animated feature films
