= Phaparbari =

Coordinates: 27°3′N 85°20′E

Phaparbari फापरबारी
- Village development committee
- Interactive map of Phaparbari
- Country: Nepal
- Province: Bagmati Province
- District: Makwanpur District
- Rural municipality: Bagmati Rural Municipality

Population (1991)
  - Total: 13,063
- Time zone: UTC+5:45 (Nepal Time)

Phaparbari is a village development committee in the Bagmati Rural Municipality of Makwanpur District in the Bagmati Province of Nepal. At the time of the 1991 Nepal census it had a population of 13,063 people living in 2119 individual households.
