= Tistung Deurali =

Tistung Deuralim टिस्टुङ
- Village development committee
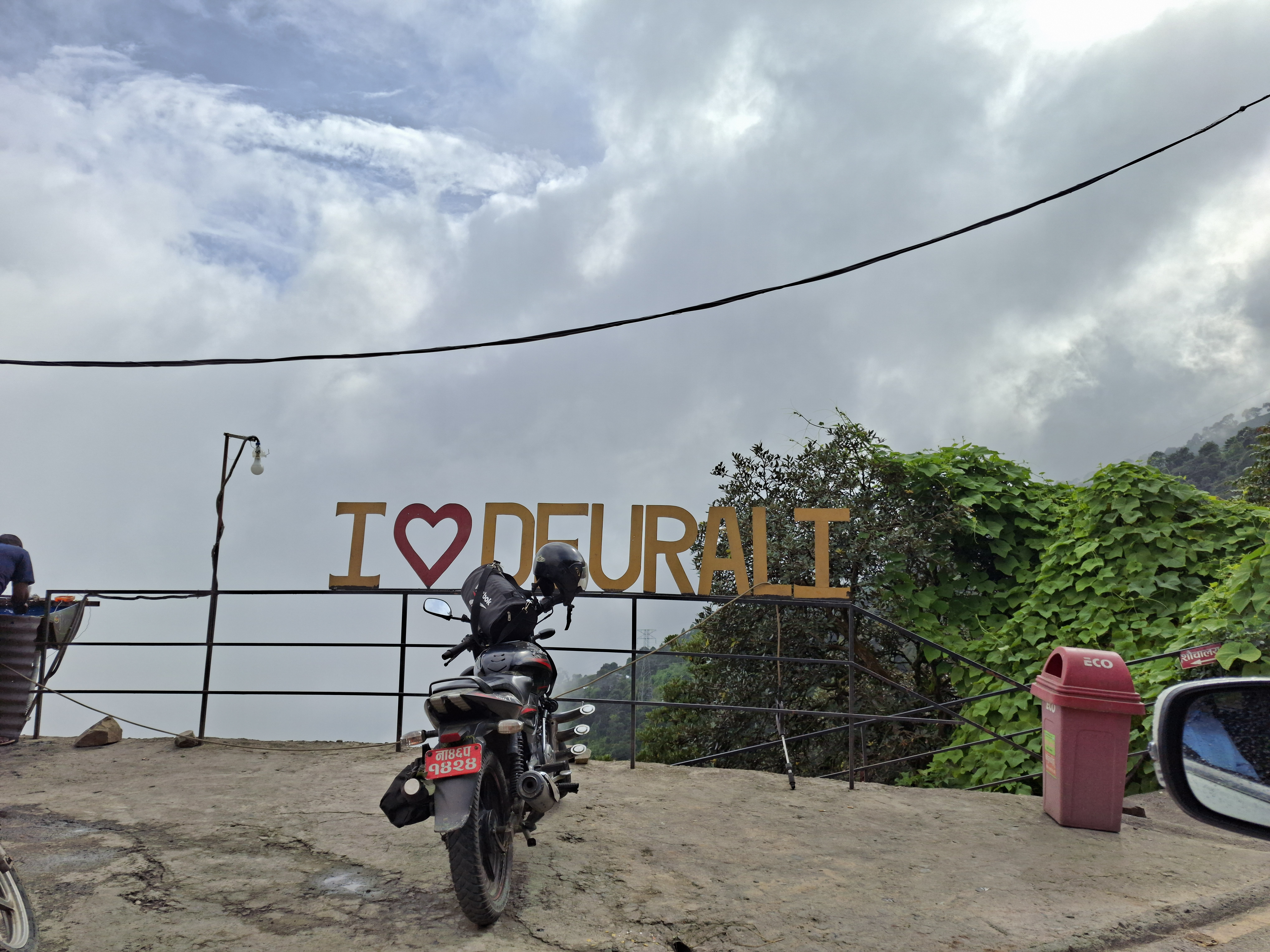
- Deurali in 2026

- Location in Nepal
- Coordinates: 27.68°N 85.08°E
- Country: Nepal
- Province: Bagmati Province
- District: Makwanpur District
- Municipality: Thaha Municipality

Population (1991)
  - Total: 5,418
- Time zone: UTC+5:45 (Nepal Time)

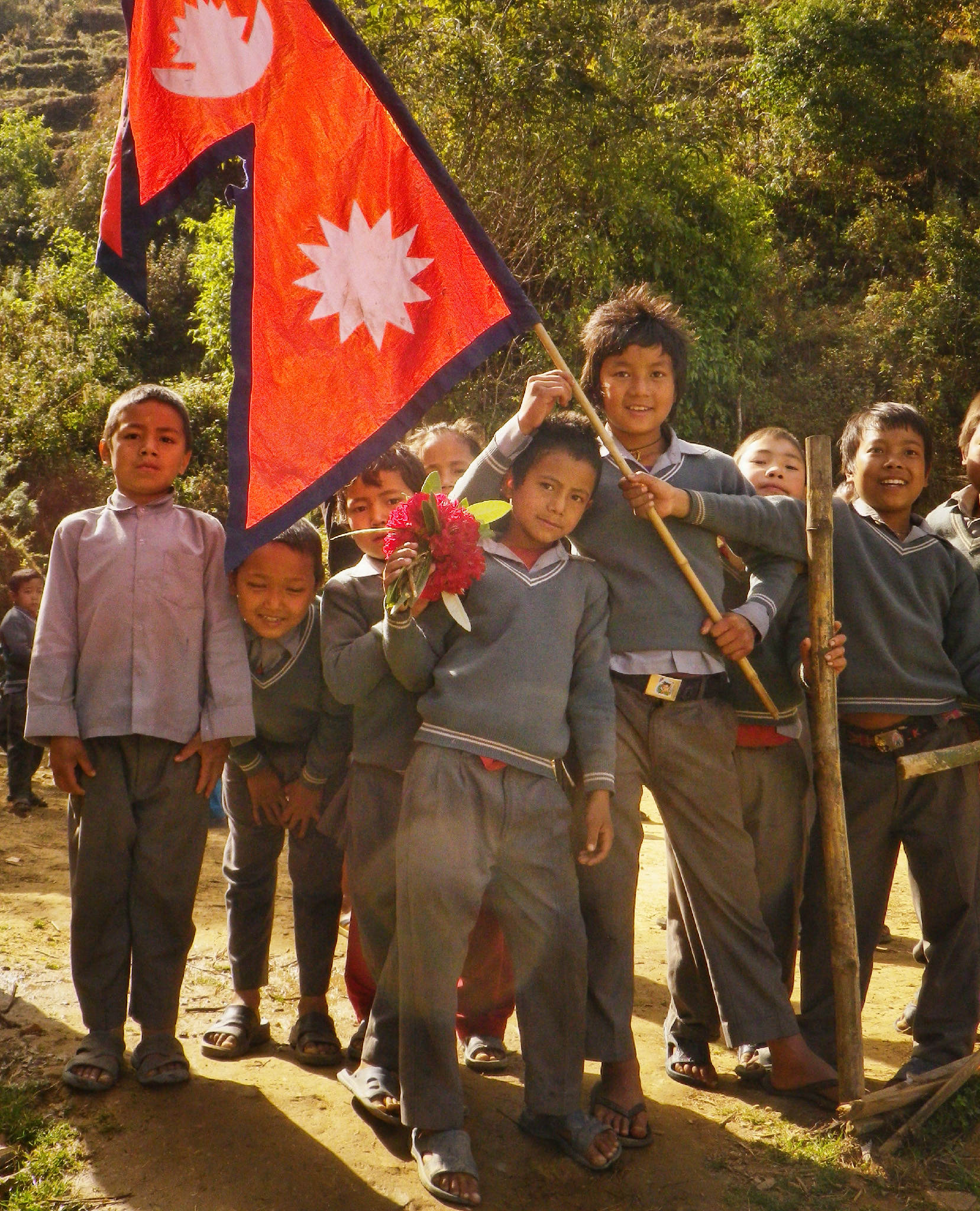
Students of Janata Primary School, northern Tistung.

Tistung Deurali is a village development committee in the Thaha Municipality of Makwanpur District in the Bagmati Province of Nepal. At the time of the 1991 Nepal census it had a population of 5,418 people living in 986 individual households.
