= Ananta Prasad Paudel =

Nepali politician

Personal details
- Born: 28 July 1962 (age 63) Bhimphedi–4, Makwanpur
- Party: Communist Party of Nepal (Unified Marxist–Leninist)

Ananta Prasad Paudel (Nepali: अनन्त प्रसाद पौडेल) (born 28 July 1962) was a member of 2nd Nepalese Constituent Assembly. He won Makwanpur–3 seat in CA assembly, 2013 with 14267 votes. He also served as a Communist Party of Nepal (Unified Marxist–Leninist) district secretary from 1997 to 2002.
