= Sisneri Mahadevsthan =

Sisneri Mahadevsthan सिस्नेरी
- Village development committee
- Location in Nepal
- Coordinates: 27.56°N 85.22°E
- Country: Nepal
- Province: Bagmati Province
- District: Makwanpur District
- Rural municipality: Indrasarowar Rural Municipality

Population (1991)
  - Total: 2,826
- Time zone: UTC+5:45 (Nepal Time)

Sisneri Mahadevsthan is a village development committee in the Indrasarowar Rural Municipality of Makwanpur District in the Bagmati Province of Nepal. At the time of the 1991 Nepal census it had a population of 2826 people living in 547 individual households.
