= Khairang, Makwanpur =

Khairang खैराङ
- Village development committee
- Location in Nepal
- Coordinates: 27.66°N 84.85°E
- Country: Nepal
- Province: Bagmati Province
- District: Makwanpur District
- Rural municipality: Raksirang Rural Municipality

Population (1991)
  - Total: 2,535
- Time zone: UTC+5:45 (Nepal Time)

VDC Map of Makawanpur District

Khairang is a village development committee in the Raksirang Rural Municipality of Makwanpur District in the Bagmati Province of southern Nepal. At the time of the 1991 Nepal census it had a population of 2535 people living in 466 individual households.

The recent population of khairang VDC is 3633 as per a survey carried out by Nepal red cross society in 2015 AD .
