= Phakhel =

Fakhel फाखेल
- Village development committee
- Location in Nepal
- Coordinates: 27.62°N 85.21°E
- Country: Nepal
- Province: Bagmati Province
- District: Makwanpur District
- Rural municipality: Indrasarowar Rural Municipality

Population (1991)
  - Total: 4,451
- Time zone: UTC+5:45 (Nepal Time)

Fakhel is a village development committee in the Indrasarowar Rural Municipality of Makwanpur District in the Bagmati Province of Nepal. At the time of the 2011 Nepal census it had a population of 4,524 people living in 1,011 individual households.

Mostly populated by the people of Tamang community. Tamang is a tribal community of Nepal mostly living in Himalayan and mountain regions like Dhading, Kavre
