= Betini, Makwanpur =

Betini बेतिनी
- Village development committee
- Location in Nepal
- Coordinates: 27.38°N 85.42°E
- Country: Nepal
- Province: Bagmati Province
- District: Makwanpur District
- Rural municipality: Bagmati Rural Municipality

Population (1991)
  - Total: 2,595
- Time zone: UTC+5:45 (Nepal Time)

Betini is a village development committee in the Bagmati Rural Municipality of Makwanpur District in the Bagmati Province of Nepal. At the time of the 1991 Nepal census it had a population of 2595 people living in 455 individual households.
