= Gogane, Makwanpur =

Gogane गोगने
- Village development committee
- Location in Nepal
- Coordinates: 27.64°N 84.98°E
- Country: Nepal
- Province: Bagmati Province
- District: Makwanpur District
- Rural municipality: Kailash Rural Municipality

Population (1991)
  - Total: 4,493
- Time zone: UTC+5:45 (Nepal Time)

Gogane is a village development committee in the Kailash Rural Municipality of Makwanpur District in the Bagmati Province of Nepal. At the time of the 1991 Nepal census it had a population of 4493 people living in 809 individual households.
