= Manthali, Makwanpur =

Manthali मन्थली
- Village development committee
- Location in Nepal
- Coordinates: 27.44°N 85.30°E
- Country: Nepal
- Province: Bagmati Province
- District: Makwanpur District
- Rural municipality: Bakaiya Rural Municipality

Population (1991)
  - Total: 2,154
- Time zone: UTC+5:45 (Nepal Time)

Manthali is a village development committee in the Bakaiya Rural Municipality of Makwanpur District in the Bagmati Province of southern Nepal. At the time of the 1991 Nepal census it had a population of 2154 people living in 370 individual households.
