= Shikharpur, Baitadi =

Shikharpur शिखरपुर
- Village development committee
- Location in Nepal
- Coordinates: 29.52°N 80.67°E
- Country: Nepal
- Zone: Mahakali Zone
- District: Baitadi District

Population (1991)
  - Total: 3,798
  - Religions: Hindu
- Time zone: UTC+5:45 (Nepal Time)

Shikharpur (Nepali: शिखरपुर) is a village development committee in Baitadi District in the Mahakali Zone of western Nepal. At the time of the 1991 Nepal census it had a population of 3,798 and had 663 houses in the town.
