= Manahari Rural Municipality =

Manahari मनहरी गाँउपालिका
- Rural Municipality
- Manahari Bazar

- Location in Nepal
- Coordinates: 27.55°N 84.79°E
- Country: Nepal
- Province: Bagmati Province
- District: Makwanpur District

Population (1991)
  - Total: 10,013
- Time zone: UTC+5:45 (Nepal Time)
- Website: http://manaharimun.gov.np

Manahari is a Rural Municipality in Makwanpur District in the Bagmati Province of Nepal. At the time of the 1991 Nepal census it had a population of 10,013 people living in 1789 individual households.

== Demographics ==
At the time of the 2011 Nepal census, Manahari Rural Municipality had a population of 39,122. Of these, 47.6% spoke Nepali, 43.8% Tamang, 5.8% Chepang, 0.9% Newar, 0.8% Magar, 0.3% Gurung, 0.2% Bankariya, 0.2% Bhojpuri, 0.1% Maithili, 0.1% Rai, 0.1% Urdu and 0.2% other languages as their first language.

In terms of ethnicity/caste, 46.8% were Tamang, 13.0% Chhetri, 11.5% Hill Brahmin, 9.4% Chepang/Praja, 4.6% Kami, 3.6% Rai, 2.8% Magar, 2.1% Newar, 1.6% Sanyasi/Dasnami, 1.4% Damai/Dholi, 0.6% Gurung, 0.6% Thakuri, 0.5% Majhi, 0.3% Musalman, 0.3% Sarki, 0.2% Limbu, 0.1% Danuwar, 0.1% Gharti/Bhujel, 0.1% Pahari, 0.1% Teli, 0.1% Tharu and 0.2% others.

In terms of religion, 48.7% were Hindu, 42.8% Buddhist, 6.8% Christian, 1.1% Prakriti, 0.3% Muslim, 0.1% Kirati and 0.1% others.

In terms of literacy, 65.4% could read and write, 2.4% could only read and 32.1% could neither read nor write.
