= Indrasarowar Rural Municipality =

Indrasarowar (RM) इन्द्रसरोवर गाउँपालिका
- Rural Municipality
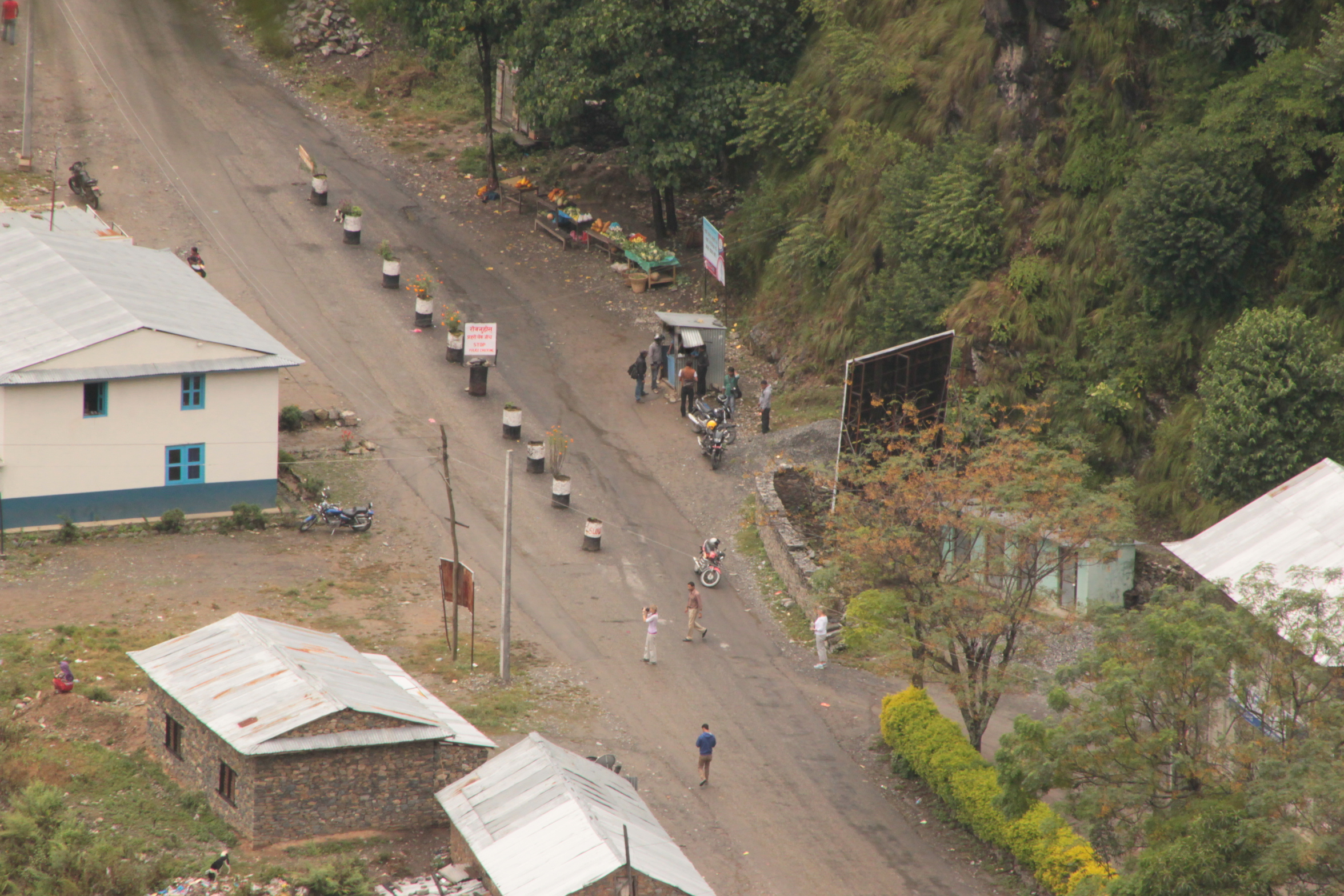
- Somewhere in Kulekhani (Indrasarowar)

- Location Indrasarowar (RM) (Nepal)
- Coordinates: 27°34′38″N 85°10′25″E
- Country: Nepal
- Province: Bagmati
- District: Makwanpur
- Wards: 5
- Established: 10 March 2017

Government
  - Type: Rural Council
  - Chairperson: Mr. Jiwan Lama (CPN (US))
  - Vice-chairperson: Mrs. Uma Kumari Lama

Area
  - Total: 97.33 km^{2} (37.58 sq mi)

Population (2011)
  - Total: 17,585
  - Density: 180.7/km^{2} (467.9/sq mi)
- Time zone: UTC+5:45 (Nepal Standard Time)
- Headquarter: Kulekhani
- Website: indrasarowarmun.gov.np

Indrasarowar is a rural municipality located within the Makwanpur District of the Bagmati Province, Nepal. The municipality spans 97.33 square kilometres (37.58 sq mi) of area, with a total population of 17,585 according to the 2011 Nepal census.

On March 10, 2017, the Government of Nepal restructured the local level bodies into 753 new local level structures. The previous Markhu, Kulekhani, Sisneri Mahadevsthan and Phakhel VDCs were merged to form Indrasarowar Rural Municipality. Indrasarowar is divided into 5 wards, with Kulekhani declared the administrative center of the rural municipality.

== Demographics ==
At the time of the 2011 Nepal census, Indrasarowar Rural Municipality had a population of 13,891. Of these, 71.6% spoke Tamang, 18.7% Nepali, 6.4% Newar, 1.8% Magar, 1.1% Lepcha, 0.1% Gurung, 0.1% Maithili and 0.2% other languages as their first language.

In terms of ethnicity/caste, 72.1% were Tamang, 8.5% Newar, 7.7% Chhetri, 6.6% Magar, 1.6% Hill Brahmin, 0.9% Hajam/Thakur, 0.9% Kami, 0.4% Damai/Dholi, 0.4% Thakuri, 0.2% Gurung, 0.2% Sanyasi/Dasnami, 0.1% Tharu and 0.4% others.

In terms of religion, 65.6% were Buddhist, 32.6% Hindu and 1.6% Christian.

In terms of literacy, 61.1% could read and write, 3.1% could only read and 35.7% could neither read nor write.

== See also ==
- Mohini waterfall
