= Shikharpur, Makwanpur =

Shikharpur शिखरपुर
- Village development committee
- Location in Nepal
- Coordinates: 27.39°N 85.30°E
- Country: Nepal
- Province: Bagmati Province
- District: Makwanpur District
- Rural municipality: Bakaiya Rural Municipality

Population (1991)
  - Total: 3,884
- Time zone: UTC+5:45 (Nepal Time)

Shikharpur (Nepali: शिखरपुर) is a village development committee in the Bakaiya Rural Municipality of Makwanpur District in the Bagmati Province of Nepal. At the time of the 1991 Nepal census it had a population of 3884 people living in 667 individual households.

On 25 August 2010, an Agni Air Flight 101 flight crashed and 14 people along with the crew died here.
