= Bakaiya Rural Municipality =

Rural municipality in Bagmati, Nepal

Bakaiya (RM) बकैया गाउँपालिका
- Rural Municipality
- Location Bakaiya (RM) (Nepal)
- Coordinates: 27.333155°N 85.203175°E
- Country: Nepal
- Province: Bagmati
- District: Makwanpur
- Wards: 12
- Established: 10 March 2017

Government
  - Type: Rural Council
  - Chairperson: Mr. Damodar Khanal
  - Vice-chairperson: Mrs. Sarla Bolkhe

Area
  - Total: 393.75 km^{2} (152.03 sq mi)

Population (2011)
  - Total: 39,620
  - Density: 100.6/km^{2} (260.6/sq mi)
- Time zone: UTC+5:45 (Nepal Standard Time)
- Headquarter: Chhatiwan
- Website: bakaiyamun.gov.np

Bakaiya is a Rural municipality located within the Makwanpur District of the Bagmati Province of Nepal. The municipality spans 393.75 square kilometres (152.03 sq mi) of area, with a total population of 39,620 according to the 2011 Nepal census.

On March 10, 2017, the Government of Nepal restructured the local level bodies into 753 new local level structures. The previous Dhimal, Chhatiwan, Shikharpur, Manthali and Thingan VDCs were merged to form Bakaiya Rural Municipality. Bakaiya is divided into 12 wards, with Chhatiwan declared the administrative center of the rural municipality.

== Demographics ==
At the time of the 2011 Nepal census, Bakaiya Rural Municipality had a population of 39,642. Of these, 73.1% spoke Tamang, 25.4% Nepali, 0.5% Magar, 0.3% Bhojpuri, 0.3% Rai, 0.2% Maithili, 0.1% Newar and 0.1% other languages as their first language.

In terms of ethnicity/caste, 73.3% were Tamang, 6.0% Hill Brahmin, 5.8% Chhetri, 3.3% Majhi, 3.0% Kami, 2.1% Rai, 1.4% Magar, 1.1% Danuwar, 1.1% Ghale, 0.4% Damai/Dholi, 0.4% Newar, 0.3% other Dalit, 0.3% Gurung, 0.3% Terai Brahmin, 0.2% Sunuwar, 0.1% Brahmu/Baramo, 0.1% Kalwar, 0.1% Kathabaniyan, 0.1% Pahari, 0.1% Yadav and 0.3% others.

In terms of religion, 72.8% were Buddhist, 25.7% Hindu, 1.2% Christian and 0.3% others.

In terms of literacy, 56.3% could read and write, 3.1% could only read and 40.6% could neither read nor write.
