= Kulekhani =

Kulekhani कुलेखानी
- Rural Municipality
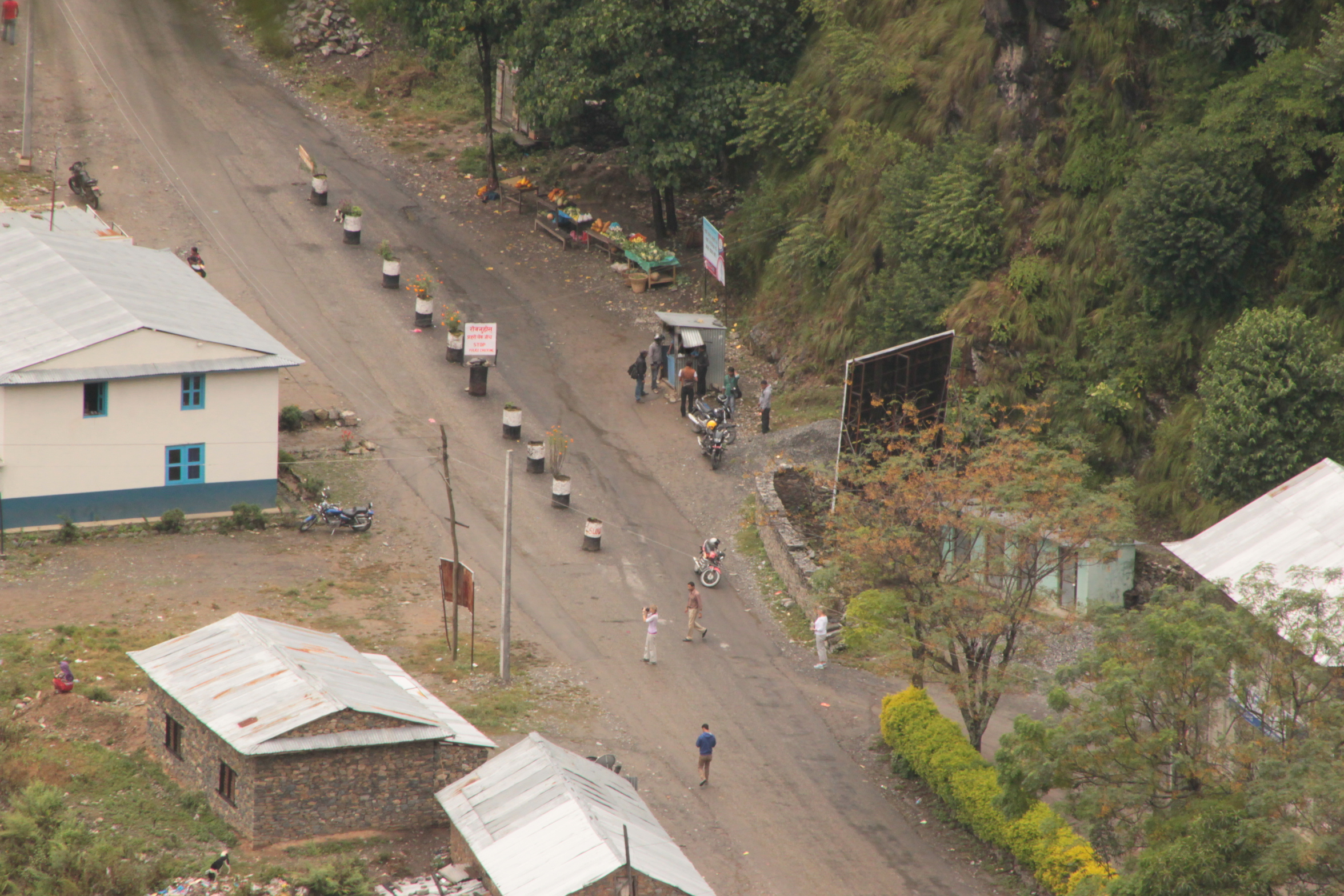
- A place of Kulekhani

- Location in Nepal
- Coordinates: 27.58°N 85.17°E
- Country: Nepal
- Province: Bagmati Province
- District: Makwanpur District
- Rural municipality: Indrasarowar Rural Municipality

Population (1991)
  - Total: 2,972
- Time zone: UTC+5:45 (Nepal Time)

Kulekhani is a village development committee in the Indrasarowar Rural Municipality of Makwanpur District in the Bagmati Province of Nepal. At the time of the 1991 Nepal census it had a population of 2,972 living in 535 individual households. It is the location of the Kulekhani Dam.
