= Bagmati Rural Municipality, Makwanpur =

Bagmati (RM) बागमती गाउँपालिका
- Rural Municipality
- Location Bagmati (RM) (Nepal)
- Coordinates: 27°19′07″N 85°24′46″E
- Country: Nepal
- Province: Bagmati
- District: Makwanpur
- Wards: 9
- Established: 10 March 2017

Government
  - Type: Rural Council
  - Chairperson: Mr.Sarkesh Ghalan
  - Vice-chairperson: Mr. Phanidra kumar timalsina

Area
  - Total: 311.79 km^{2} (120.38 sq mi)

Population (2011)
  - Total: 30,495
  - Density: 97.806/km^{2} (253.32/sq mi)
- Time zone: UTC+5:45 (Nepal Standard Time)
- Headquarter: Jhurjhure
- Website: bagmatimunmakawanpur.gov.np

Bagmati is a Rural municipality located within the Makwanpur District of the Bagmati Province of Nepal. The municipality spans 311.79 square kilometres (120.38 sq mi) of area, with a population of 30,495, according to the 2011 Nepal census.

On March 10, 2017, the Government of Nepal restructured the local level bodies into 753 new local level structures. The previous Raigaun, Phaparbari and Betini VDCs were merged to form Bagmati Rural Municipality. Bagmati is divided into 9 wards, with Phaparbari declared the administrative center of the rural municipality.

== Demographics ==
At the time of the 2011 Nepal census, Bagmati Rural Municipality had a population of 30,587. Of these, 60.4% spoke Tamang, 21.6% Nepali, 7.5% Magar, 5.9% Rai, 2.2% Majhi, 1.2% Pahari, 0.5% Newar, 0.2% Bhojpuri, 0.2% Danuwar, 0.1% Bhujel, 0.1% Maithili and 0.1% other languages as their first language.

In terms of ethnicity/caste, 60.5% were Tamang, 12.4% Magar, 8.3% Rai, 4.7% Majhi, 3.9% Pahari, 3.2% Kami, 2.0% Chhetri, 1.7% Hill Brahmin, 1.6% Newar, 0.7% Damai/Dholi, 0.2% Danuwar, 0.1% Brahmu/Baramo, 0.1% Gharti/Bhujel, 0.1% Sarki and 0.3% others.

In terms of religion, 66.3% were Buddhist, 27.8% Hindu, 3.6% Christian, 2.1% Prakriti and 0.2% others.

In terms of literacy, 54.0% could read and write, 3.4% could only read and 42.6% could neither read nor write.
