= Bhagmati =

Wife of Sultan Muhammad Quli Qutb Shah

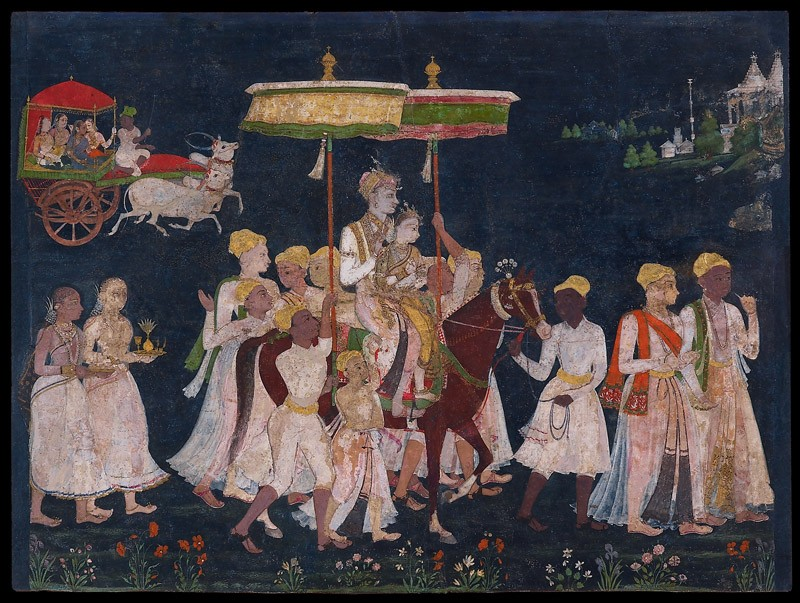
Wedding procession of Muhammad Quli Qutb Shah with Bhagmati.

Bhagamati (Hyder Mahal), also known as Bhagyawati, was a queen of Sultan Muhammad Quli Qutb Shah, in whose honour Hyderabad was supposedly named. The historicity of her existence is debated among scholars.

== Popular narrative ==
Bhagmati was born in 'Chichlam' (a location yet to be identified with certainty) to a Hindu family; He founded a city at her birth-place and named it Bhaganagar or Bhāgyanagar in her honor. After she converted to Islam and adopted the title Hyder Mahal, the city was renamed Hyderabad.

== Scholarly debates ==
That Purana pul was completed in 1578 after 2 years of construction; Qutb Shah (b:1566) was romancing Bhagmati as young as ten years. Furthermore, no tomb was built over her last remains unlike other leading female figures of the court; no inscription or coin of that period mentions her name. The chroniclers who mentioned of her were either from North of the Sultanate, who did not visit Hyderabad or foreigners, who arrived long after her death; contemporary Deccani sources including Qutb Shah himself don't mention of her at all. The conferral of 'Hyder', an immensely sacred Islamic attribute on a nautch-girl has been doubted as well. All these cast significant doubts on the authenticity of Bhagmati's existence.

Some however assert that the historicity of multiple sources can't be rejected as hearsay due to their foreign nature, sources exist in that the State Museum in Public Gardens has a portrait of her commissioned around 1750, and that her conspicuous absence from Deccani sources were a result of damnatio memoriae. Others believe Bhagnagar (which was indeed named after her) was a separate village which has nothing to do with today's Hyderabad.
