= Makwanpur District =

Coordinates: 27°25′N 85°02′E

Makwanpur District मकवानपुर
- District
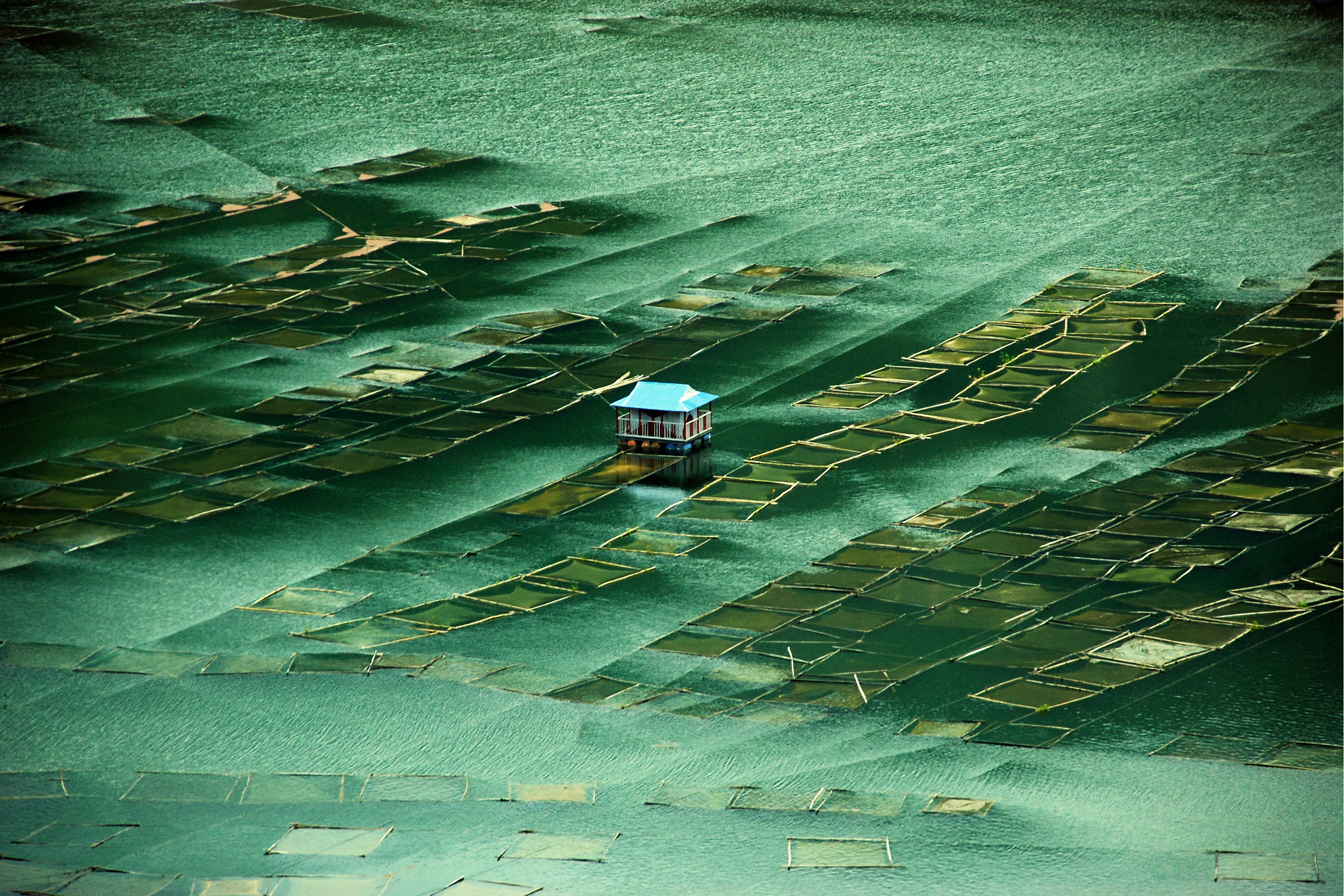
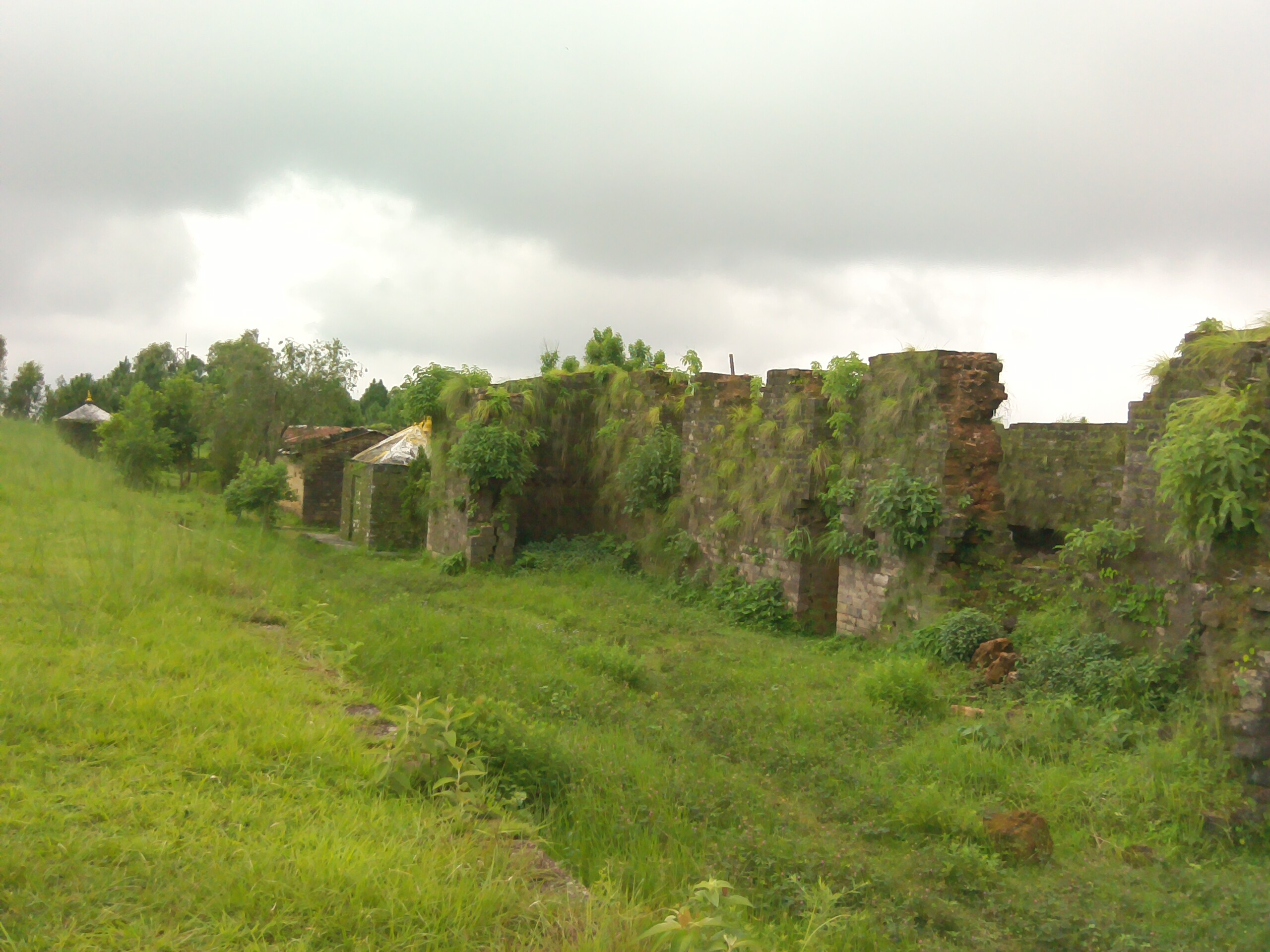
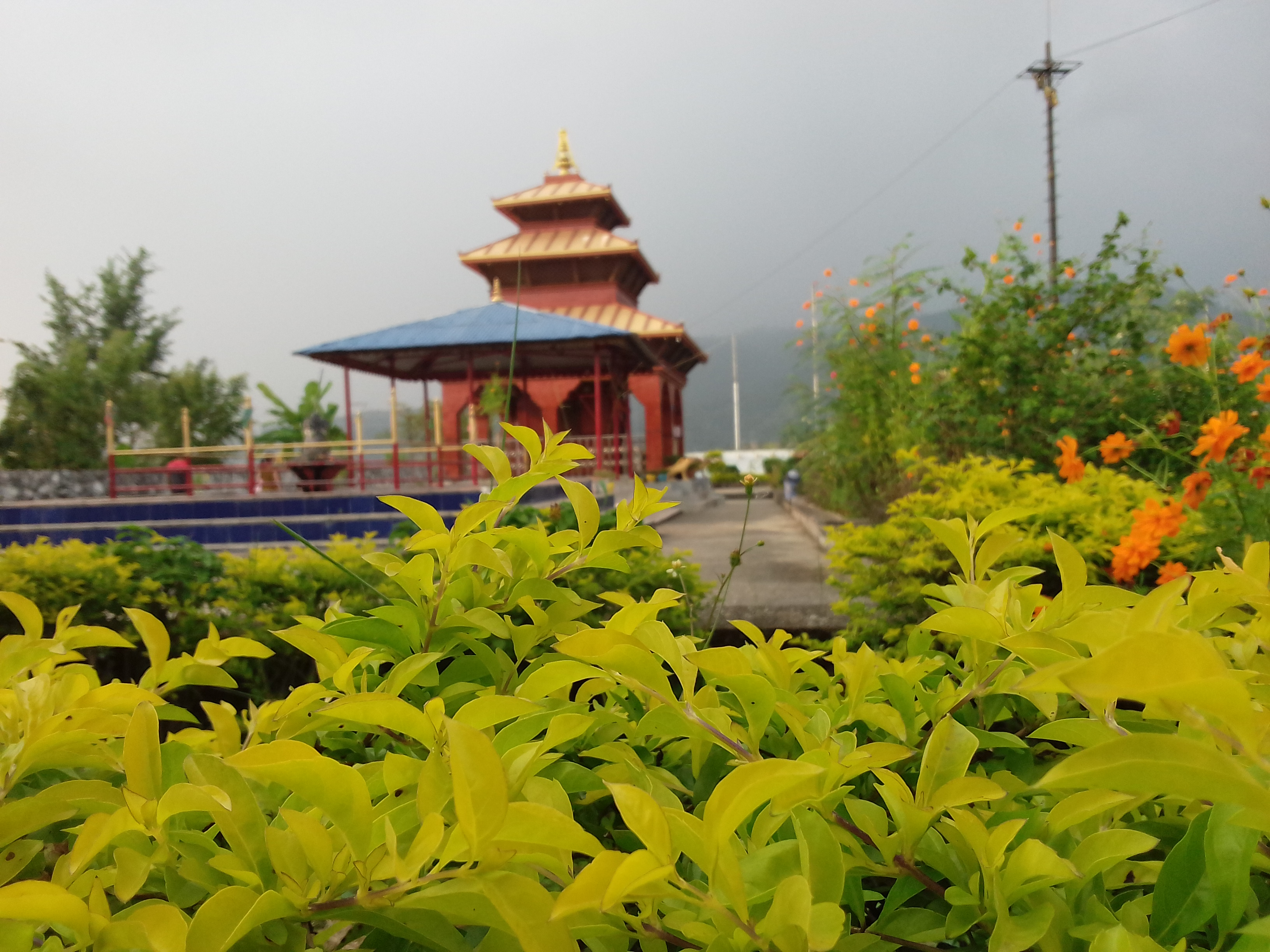
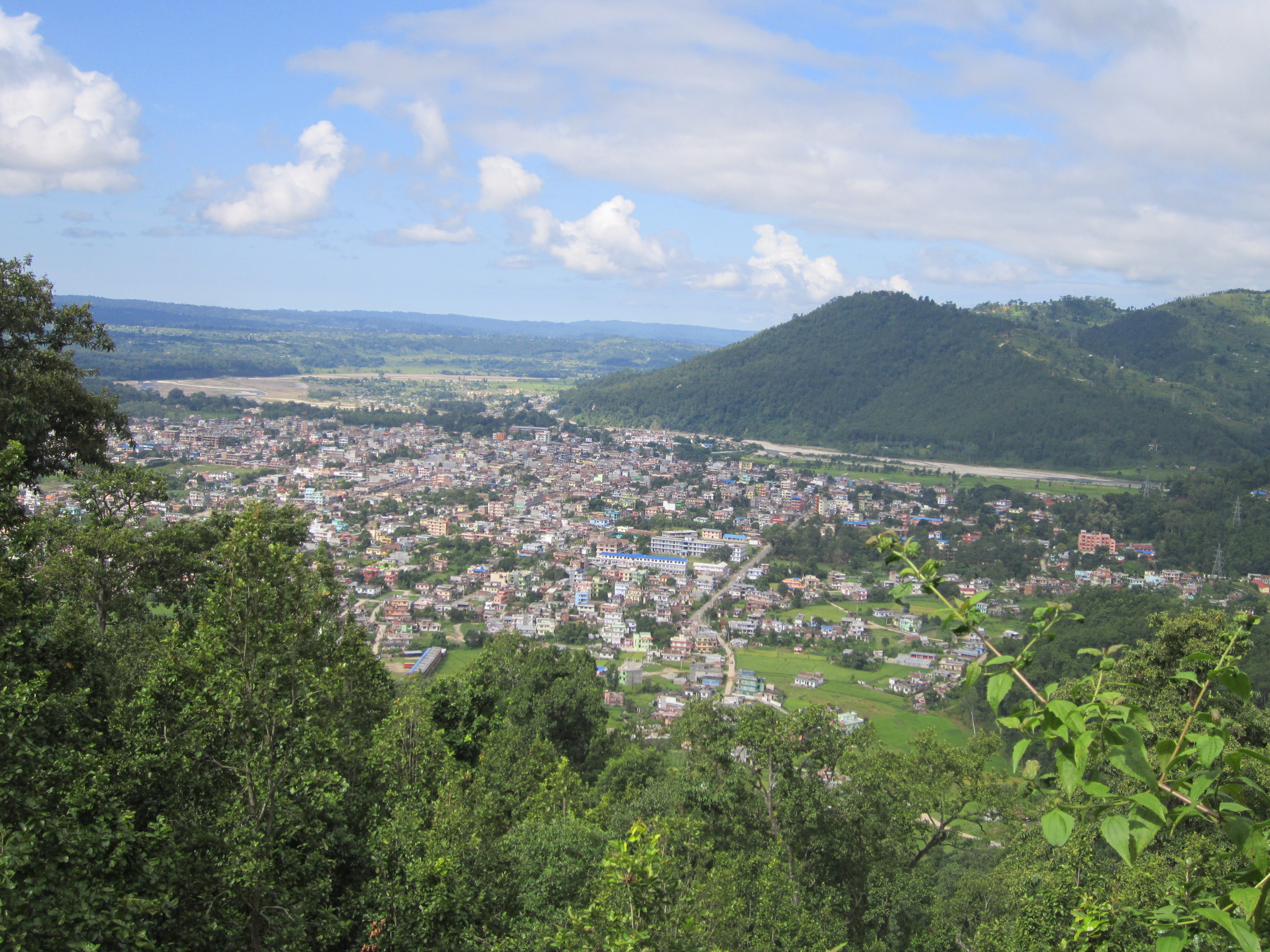
- Kulekhani Reservoir, Kushmanda Sarowar Triveni Dham, Hetauda city (Headquarter), Remains of Makwanpur fort (Clockwise from top)

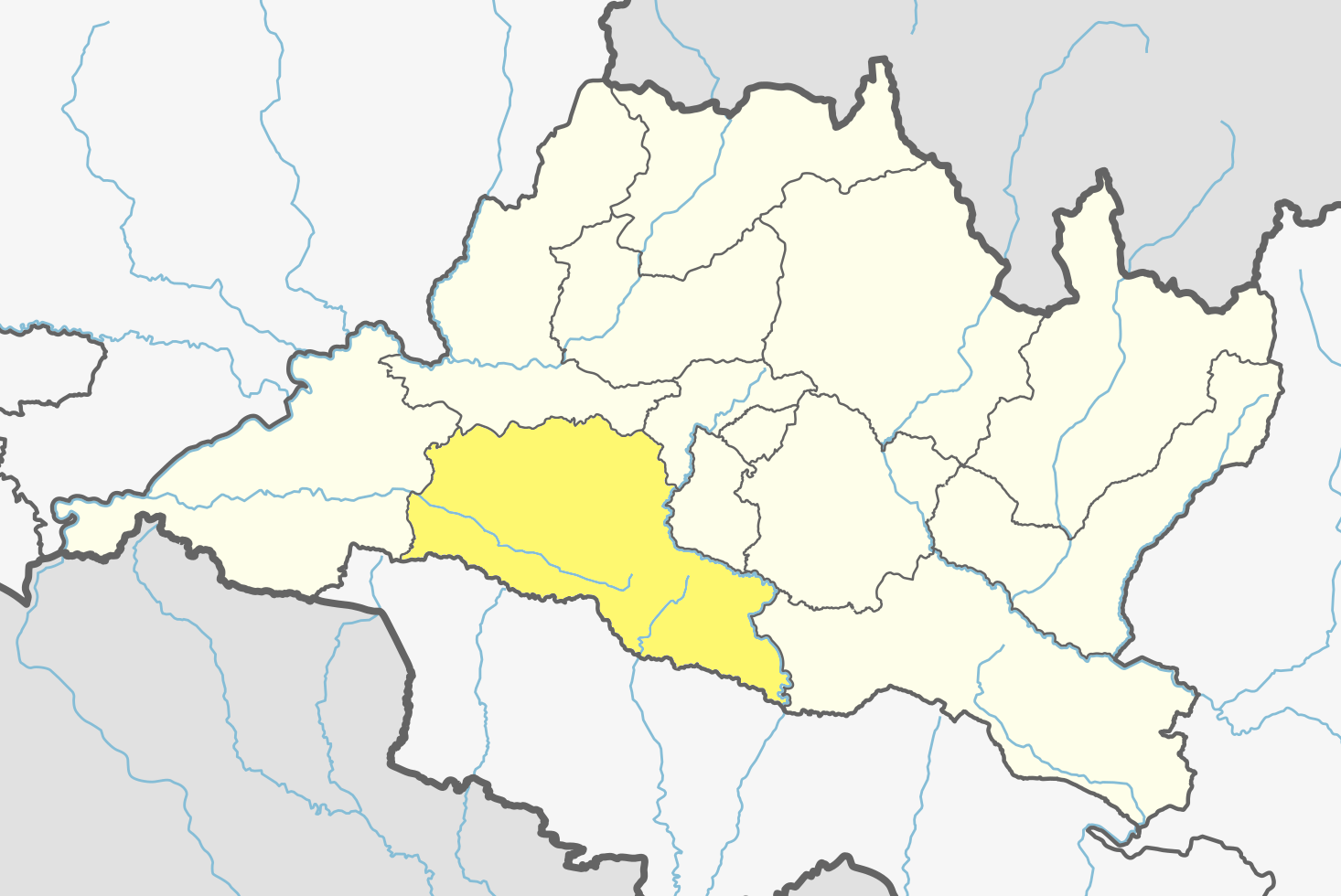
- Location of district in province
- Country: Nepal
- Province: Bagmati Province
- Admin HQ.: Hetauda
- Former HQ.: Bhimphedi

Government
  - Type: Coordination committee
  - Body: DCC, Makawanpur

Area
  - Total: 2,426 km^{2} (937 sq mi)

Population (2011)
  - Total: 420,477
  - Density: 173.3/km^{2} (448.9/sq mi)
- Time zone: UTC+05:45 (NPT)
- Main Language(s): Nepali
- Website: www.ddcmakwanpur.gov.np

Makwanpur District (Nepali: मकवानपुर जिल्ला;), in Bagmati Province, earlier a part of Narayani Zone, is one of the seventy-seven districts of Nepal. The city of Hetauda serves as the district headquarters and also as the provincial headquarters. The district covers an area of 2,426 km^{2} (937 sq mi) and had a population of 392,604 in 2001 and 420,477 in 2011. The latest census of 2021 recorded the population of Makwanpur as 466,073.

== History ==
During Rana regime, the district was named Chisapani District and the headquarter of the district was situated in Chisapani Gadhi, Bhimphedi. The district renamed as Makwanpur on the name of Makwanpurgadhi and the headquarter moved to Hetauda in 1982.

== Geography and climate ==
Climate Zone	Elevation Range	% of Area
Lower Tropical	below 300 meters (1,000 ft)	7.2%
Upper Tropical	300 to 1,000 meters 1,000 to 3,300 ft.	59.0%
Subtropical	1,000 to 2,000 meters 3,300 to 6,600 ft.	28.9%
Temperate	2,000 to 3,000 meters 6,400 to 9,800 ft.	4.9%

== Demographics ==
Historical population
Census year	Pop.	±% p.a.
1981	243,411	—
1991	314,599	+2.60%
2001	392,604	+2.24%
2011	420,477	+0.69%
2021	461,053	+0.93%
Source: Citypopulation

At the time of the 2021 Nepal census, Makwanpur District had a population of 466,073. 7.87% of the population is under 5 years of age. It has a literacy rate of 77.82% and a sex ratio of 993 females per 1000 males. 232,446 (49.87%) lived in municipalities.

Castes/ethnic groups in Makwanpur District (2021)
1. Tamang (46.8%)
2. Bahun (13.9%)
3. Chhetri (10.6%)
4. Newar (5.51%)
5. Chepang (5.07%)
6. Magar (4.48%)
7. Kami (2.93%)
8. Rai (2.45%)
9. Other Hill Janjati (2.28%)
10. Madheshi non-Dalit (1.86%)
11. Other Khas Dalit (1.23%)
12. Other Khas non-Dalit (1.12%)
13. Others (1.82%)

Ethnicity wise: Hill Janjatis are the largest group, making up 61% of the population. Tamangs were the largest Hill Janjati group, making up 47% of the population. Khas people made up 30% of the population.

Languages of Makwanpur district (2021)
1. Tamang (44.2%)
2. Nepali (41.2%)
3. Chepang (4.42%)
4. Nepal Bhasha (3.79%)
5. Bhojpuri (1.75%)
6. Magar (1.45%)
7. Others (3.18%)

As their first language, 44.23% of the population spoke Tamang, 41.17% Nepali, 4.42% Chepang, 3.79% Nepal Bhasha, 1.75% Bhojpuri and 1.45% Magar as their first language. In 2011, 41.5% of the population spoke Nepali as their first language.

Religion in Makwanpur District (2021)
Religion	Percent
Hinduism	48.73%
Buddhism	43.90%
Christianity	6.12%
Islam	0.70%
Other or not stated	0.55%

== Administration ==
The district consists of 10 Municipalities, out of which one is a sub-metropolitan city, one is an urban municipality and eight are rural municipalities. These are as follows:

- Hetauda Sub-Metropolitan City
- Thaha Municipality
- Bhimphedi Rural Municipality
- Makawanpurgadhi Rural Municipality
- Manahari Rural Municipality
- Raksirang Rural Municipality
- Bakaiya Rural Municipality
- Bagmati Rural Municipality
- Kailash Rural Municipality
- Indrasarowar Rural Municipality

=== Former Village Development Committees and Municipalities ===
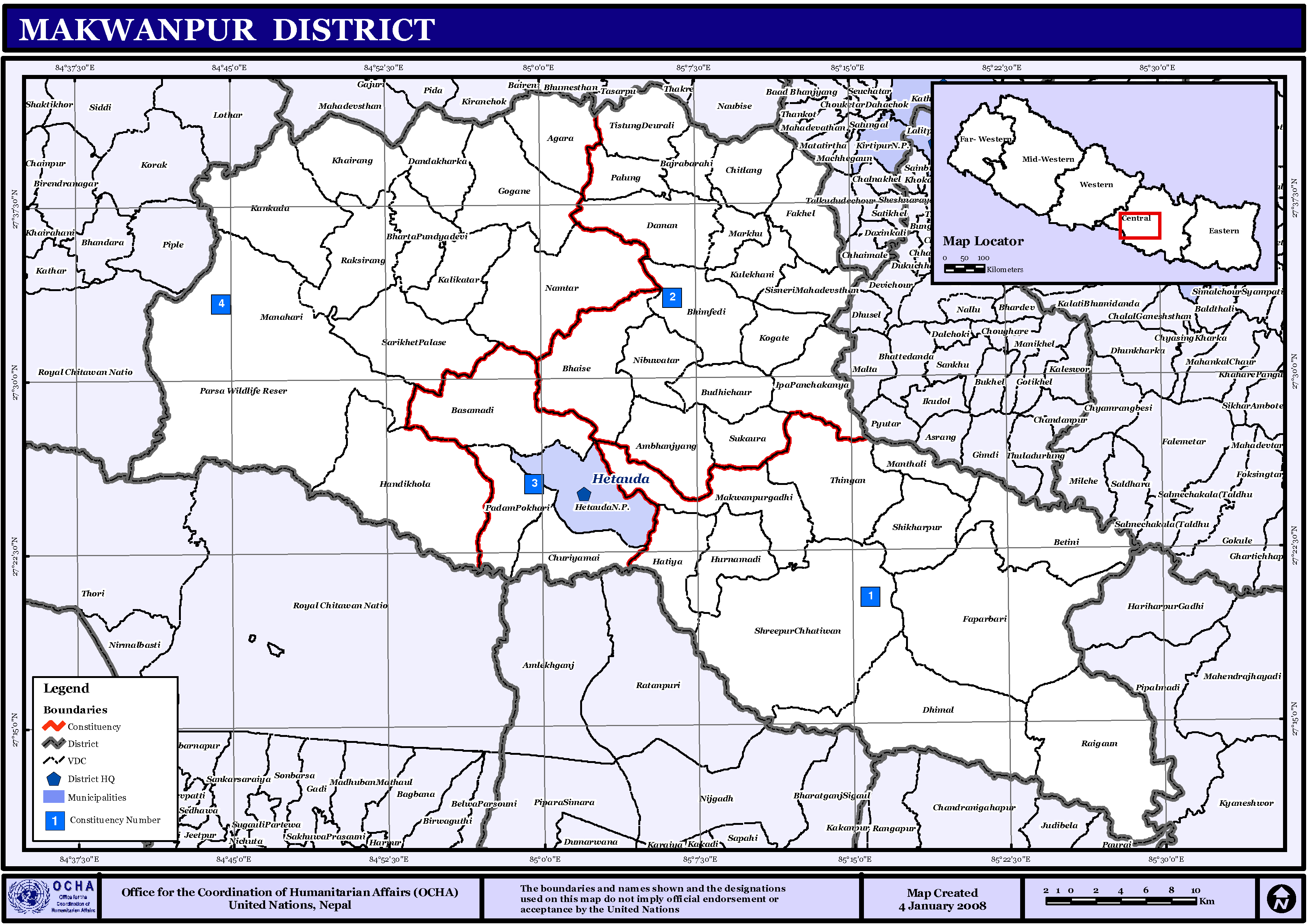
Map of the VDCs and Municipalities (blue) in Makwanpur District

- Agara
- Ambhanjyang
- Bajrabarahi
- Betini
- Bhainse
- Bharta Pundyadevi
- Bhimphedi
- Budhichaur
- Chhatiwan
- Chitlang
- Dandakharka
- Dhimal
- Gogane
- Handikhola
- Hetauda (Sub metropolitan city)
- Hurnamadi
- Ipa Panchakanya
- Kalikatar
- Kankada
- Khairang
- Kogate
- Kulekhani
- Makwanpurgadhi
- Manahari
- Manthali
- Markhu
- Marta Punchedevi
- Namtar
- Nibuwatar
- Fakhel
- Phaparbari
- Raigaun
- Raksirang
- Sarikhet Palase
- Shikharpur
- Sripur Chhatiwan
- Sisneri Mahadevsthan
- Sukaura
- Thaha Municipality
- Thingan
- Tistung Deurali

== Notable people ==
- Rupchandra Bista - Nepalese politician
- Kamal Thapa - Nepalese politician
- Ganesh Thapa - ex. president of the All Nepal Football Association
- Kabiraj Negi Lama - Nepalese National Para Taekwondo Team Coach, 2020 Summer Paralympics and 2024 Summer Paralympics Coach
- Ananta Prasad Paudel - Nepalese politician
- Ganesh Lal Shrestha - Nepalese poet, musician and social worker
- Bal Krishna Pokharel - Nepalese writer, linguist, historian, and literary critic
- Kedar Ghimire - Nepalese comedian, actor, scriptwriter, and film producer
- Ajeya Sumargi - chairman of the Muktishree group of companies
- Anjan Bista - Nepali footballer
- Bikash Bista - Nepalese Economist and Statistician, and the former Director General of Central Bureau of Statistics of Nepal
- Birodh Khatiwada - Nepalese politician
- Shrinkhala Khatiwada - Nepalese model and Miss Nepal World 2018
- Sunil Bal - Nepalese footballer
