= Raksirang Rural Municipality =

Raksirang राक्सिराङ
- Rural municipality
- Location in Nepal
- Coordinates: 27.59°N 84.86°E
- Country: Nepal
- Province: Bagmati Province
- District: Makwanpur District

Population (1991)
  - Total: 6,343
- Time zone: UTC+5:45 (Nepal Time)
- Website: http://raksirangmun.gov.np

Raksirang is a rural municipality in Makwanpur District in the Bagmati Province of Nepal. At the time of the 1991 Nepal census, Raksirang village development committee had a population of 6343.

== Demographics ==
At the time of the 2011 Nepal census, Raksirang Rural Municipality had a population of 26,192. Of these, 50.4% spoke Tamang, 36.0% Chepang, 11.6% Nepali, 1.5% Magar, 0.2% Bhojpuri, 0.1% Maithili, 0.1% Newar and 0.2% other languages as their first language.

In terms of ethnicity/caste, 50.5% were Tamang, 37.4% Chepang/Praja, 3.9% Chhetri, 2.5% Kami, 1.8% Thakuri, 1.7% Magar, 0.7% Newar, 0.6% Damai/Dholi, 0.2% Hill Brahmin, 0.1% Gharti/Bhujel, 0.1% Sunuwar, 0.1% Yadav and 0.3% others.

In terms of religion, 47.4% were Buddhist, 25.0% Hindu, 23.9% Christian, 3.6% Prakriti and 0.1% others.

In terms of literacy, 54.1% could read and write, 3.7% could only read and 42.1% could neither read nor write.
