= Surnames by country =

Surname conventions and laws vary around the world. This article gives an overview of surnames around the world.

== Spanish-speaking countries ==
=== Argentina ===
In Argentina, normally only one family name, the father's paternal family name, is used and registered, as in English-speaking countries. However, it is possible to use both the paternal and maternal name. For example, if Ana Laura Melachenko and Emanuel Darío Guerrero had a daughter named Adabel Anahí, her full name could be Adabel Anahí Guerrero Melachenko. Women, however, do not change their family names upon marriage and continue to use their birth family names instead of their husband's family names. However, women have traditionally, and some still choose to use the old Spanish custom of adjoining "de" and her husband's surname to her own name. For example, if Paula Segovia marries Felipe Cossia, she might keep her birth name or become Paula Segovia de Cossia or Paula Cossia.

There are some province offices where a married woman can use only her birth name, and some others where she has to use the complete name, for legal purposes. The Argentine Civilian Code states both uses are correct, but police offices and passports are issued with the complete name. Today most women prefer to maintain their birth name given that "de" can be interpreted as meaning they belong to their husbands.

When Eva Duarte married Juan Domingo Perón, she could be addressed as Eva Duarte de Perón, but the preferred style was Eva Perón, or the familiar and affectionate Evita (little Eva).

Combined names come from old traditional families and are considered one last name, but are rare. Although Argentina is a Spanish-speaking country, it is also composed of other varied European influences, such as Italian, French, Russian, German, etc.

Children typically use their fathers' last names only. Some state offices have started to use both last names, in the traditional father then mother order, to reduce the risk of a person being mistaken for others using the same name combinations, e.g. if Eva Duarte and Juan Perón had a child named Juan, he might be misidentified if he were called Juan Perón, but not if he was known as Juan Perón Duarte.

As of August 2015, new legislation allows the maternal surname to be placed before the paternal surname.

=== Chile ===
In Chile, marriage has no effect at all on either of the spouses' names, so people keep their birth names for all their life, no matter how many times marital status, theirs or that of their parents, may change. However, in some upper-class circles or in older couples, even though considered to be old-fashioned, it is still customary for a wife to use her husband's name as reference, as in "Doña María Inés de Ramírez" (literally Lady María Inés (wife) of Ramírez).

According to current legislation, the father and mother can choose the first surname of their children: it can be the mother's first surname followed by the father's first surname, or vice versa.

== French-speaking countries ==
France

Belgium

Canadian

== German-speaking countries ==
There are about 850,000 different family names in Germany. German family names most often derive from given names, geographical names, occupational designations, bodily attributes or even traits of character. Hyphenations notwithstanding, they mostly consist of a single word; in those rare cases where the family name is linked to the given names by particles such as von or zu, they usually indicate noble ancestry. Not all noble families used these names (see Riedesel), while some farm families, particularly in Westphalia, used the particle von or zu followed by their farm or former farm's name as a family name (see Meyer zu Erpen).

Family names in German-speaking countries are usually positioned last, after all given names. There are exceptions, however: in parts of Austria and Bavaria and the Alemannic-speaking areas, the family name is regularly put in front of the first given name. Also in many – especially rural – parts of Germany, to emphasize family affiliation there is often an inversion in colloquial use, in which the family name becomes a possessive: Rüters Erich, for example, would be Erich of the Rüter family.

In Germany today, upon marriage, both partners can choose to keep their birth name or choose either partner's name as the common name. In the latter case the partner whose name was not chosen can keep their birth name hyphenated to the new name (e.g. Schmidt and Meyer choose to marry under the name Meyer. The former Schmidt can choose to be called Meyer, Schmidt-Meyer or Meyer-Schmidt), but any children will only get the single common name. In the case that both partners keep their birth name they must decide on one of the two family names for all their future children. (German name)

Changing one's family name for reasons other than marriage, divorce or adoption is possible only if the application is approved by the responsible government agency.

== Dutch-speaking countries ==
The Netherlands and Belgium (Flanders)

== Nordic countries ==
In the Nordic countries, family names often, but certainly not always, originate from a patronymic. In Denmark and Norway, the corresponding ending is -sen, as in Karlsen. Names ending with dotter/datter (daughter), such as Olofsdotter, are rare but occurring, and only apply to women. Today, the patronymic names are passed on similarly to family names in other Western countries, and a person's father does not have to be called Karl if he or she has the surname Karlsson. However, in 2006 Denmark reinstated patronymic and matronymic surnames as an option. Thus, parents Karl Larsen and Anna Hansen can name a son Karlsen or Annasen and a daughter Karlsdotter or Annasdotter.

Before the 19th century there was the same system in Scandinavia as in Iceland today. Noble families, however, as a rule adopted a family name, which could refer to a presumed or real forefather or to the family's coat of arms. In many surviving family noble names, such as Silfversparre ("silver chevron"; in modern spelling, Silver-) or Stiernhielm ("star-helmet"; in modernized spelling, stjärnhjälm), the spelling is obsolete, but since it applies to a name, remains unchanged. (Some names from relatively modern times also use archaic or otherwise aberrant spelling as a stylistic trait; e.g. -quist instead of standard -kvist "twig" or -grén instead of standard -gren, "branch".)

Later on, people from the Scandinavian middle classes, particularly artisans and town dwellers, adopted names in a similar fashion to that of the nobility. Family names joining two elements from nature such as the Swedish Bergman ("mountain man"), Holmberg ("island mountain"), Lindgren ("linden branch"), Sandström ("sand stream") and Åkerlund ("field meadow") were quite frequent and remain common today. The same is true for similar Norwegian and Danish names. Another common practice was to adopt one's place of origin as a middle or surname.

Even more important a driver of change was the need, for administrative purposes, to develop a system under which each individual had a "stable" name from birth to death. In the old days, people would be known by their name, patronymic and the farm they lived at. This last element would change if a person got a new job, bought a new farm, or otherwise came to live somewhere else. (This is part of the origin, in this part of the world, of the custom of women changing their names upon marriage. Originally it indicated, basically, a change of address, and from older times, there are numerous examples of men doing the same thing). The many patronymic names may derive from the fact that people who moved from the country to the cities, also gave up the name of the farm they came from. As a worker, you passed by your father's name, and this name passed on to the next generation as a family name. Einar Gerhardsen, the Norwegian prime minister, used a true patronym, as his father was named Gerhard Olsen (Gerhard, the son of Ola). Gerhardsen passed his own patronym on to his children as a family name. This has been common in many working-class families. The tradition of keeping the farm name as a family name got stronger during the first half of the 20th century in Norway.

These names often indicated the place of residence of the family. For this reason, Denmark and Norway have a very high incidence of last names derived from those of farms, many signified by the suffixes like -bø, -rud, -heim/-um, -land or -set (these being examples from Norway). In Denmark, the most common suffix is -gaard — the modern spelling is gård in Danish and can be either gård or gard in Norwegian, but as in Sweden, archaic spelling persists in surnames. The most well-known example of this kind of surname is probably Kierkegaard (combined by the words "kirke/kierke" (= church) and "gaard" (= farm) meaning "the farm located by the Church". It is, however, a common misunderstanding that the name relates to its direct translation: churchyard/cemetery), but many others could be cited. It should also be noted that, since the names in question are derived from the original owners' domiciles, the possession of this kind of name is no longer an indicator of affinity with others who bear it.

In many cases, names were taken from the nature around them. In Norway, for instance, there is an abundance of surnames based on coastal geography, with suffixes like -strand, -øy, -holm, -vik, -fjord or -nes. Like the names derived from farms, most of these family names reflected the family's place of residence at the time the family name was "fixed", however. A family name such as Swedish Dahlgren is derived from "dahl" meaning valley and "gren" meaning branch; or similarly Upvall meaning "upper-valley"; It depends on the country, language, and dialect.

=== Sweden ===
In Scandinavia family names often, but certainly not always, originate from a patronymic. Later on, people from the Scandinavian middle classes, particularly artisans and town dwellers, adopted surnames in a similar fashion to that of the gentry. Family names joining two elements from nature such as the Swedish Bergman ("mountain man"), Holmberg ("island mountain"), Lindgren ("linden branch"), Sandström ("sand stream") and Åkerlund ("field grove") were quite frequent and remain common today.

=== Finland ===
Finland including Karelia and Estonia was the eastern part of The Kingdom of Sweden from its unification around 1100–1200 AD until the year 1809 when Finland was conquered by Russia. During the Russian revolution 1917, Finland proclaimed the republic Finland and Sweden and many European countries rapidly acknowledged the new nation Finland. Finland has mainly Finnish (increasing) and Swedish (decreasing) surnames and first names. There are two predominant surname traditions among the Finnish in Finland: the West Finnish and the East Finnish. The surname traditions of Swedish-speaking farmers, fishermen and craftsmen resembles the West Finnish tradition, while smaller populations of Sami and Romani people have traditions of their own. Finland was exposed to a very small immigration from Russia, so Russian names barely exist.

Until the mid-20th century, Finland was a predominantly agrarian society, and the names of West Finns were based on their association with a particular area, farm, or homestead, e.g. Jaakko Jussila ("Jaakko from the farm of Jussi"). On the other hand, the East Finnish surname tradition dates back to at least the 13th century. There, the Savonians pursued slash-and-burn agriculture which necessitated moving several times during a person's lifetime. This in turn required the families to have surnames, which were in wide use among the common folk as early as the 13th century. By the mid-16th century, the East Finnish surnames had become hereditary. Typically, the oldest East Finnish surnames were formed from the first names of the patriarchs of the families, e.g. Ikävalko, Termonen, Pentikäinen. In the 16th, 17th, and 18th centuries, new names were most often formed by adding the name of the former or current place of living (e.g. Puumalainen < Puumala). In the East Finnish tradition, the women carried the family name of their fathers in female form (e.g. Puumalatar < Puumalainen). By the 19th century, this practice fell into disuse due to the influence of the West-European surname tradition.

In Western Finland, agrarian names dominated, and the last name of the person was usually given according to the farm or holding they lived on. In 1921, surnames became compulsory for all Finns. At this point, the agrarian names were usually adopted as surnames. A typical feature of such names is the addition of prefixes Ala- (Sub-) or Ylä- (Up-), giving the location of the holding along a waterway in relation of the main holding. (e.g. Yli-Ojanperä, Ala-Verronen). The Swedish speaking farmers along the coast of Österbotten usually used two surnames – one which pointed out the father's name (e.g. Eriksson, Andersson, Johansson) and one which related to the farm or the land their family or bigger family owned or had some connection to (e.g. Holm, Fant, Westergård, Kloo). So a full name could be Johan Karlsson Kvist, for his daughter Elvira Johansdotter Kvist, and when she married a man with the Ahlskog farm, Elvira kept the first surname Johansdotter but changed the second surname to her husbands (e.g. Elvira Johansdotter Ahlskog). During the 20th century they started to drop the -son surname while they kept the second. So in Western Finland the Swedish speaking had names like Johan Varg, Karl Viskas, Sebastian Byskata and Elin Loo, while the Swedes in Sweden at the other side of the Baltic Sea kept surnames ending with -son (e.g. Johan Eriksson, Thor Andersson, Anna-Karin Johansson).

A third tradition of surnames was introduced in south Finland by the Swedish-speaking upper and middle classes, which used typical German and Swedish surnames. By custom, all Finnish-speaking persons who were able to get a position of some status in urban or learned society, discarded their Finnish name, adopting a Swedish, German or (in the case of clergy) Latin surname. In the case of enlisted soldiers, the new name was given regardless of the wishes of the individual.

In the late 19th and early 20th century, the overall modernization process, and especially the political movement of fennicization, caused a movement for adoption of Finnish surnames. At that time, many persons with a Swedish or otherwise foreign surname changed their family name to a Finnish one. The features of nature with endings -o/ö, -nen (Meriö < Meri "sea", Nieminen < Niemi "point") are typical of the names of this era, as well as more or less direct translations of Swedish names (Paasivirta < Hällström).

In 21st-century Finland, the use of surnames follows the German model. Every person is legally obligated to have a first and last name. At most, three first names are allowed. The Finnish married couple may adopt the name of either spouse, or either spouse (or both spouses) may decide to use a double name. The parents may choose either surname or the double surname for their children, but all siblings must share the same surname. All persons have the right to change their surname once without any specific reason. A surname that is un-Finnish, contrary to the usages of the Swedish or Finnish languages, or is in use by any person residing in Finland cannot be accepted as the new name, unless valid family reasons or religious or national customs give a reason for waiving this requirement. However, persons may change their surname to any surname that has ever been used by their ancestors if they can prove such claim. Some immigrants have had difficulty naming their children, as they must choose from an approved list based on the family's household language.

In the Finnish language, both the root of the surname and the first name can be modified by consonant gradation regularly when inflected to a case.

=== Iceland ===
In Iceland, most people have no family name; a person's last name is most commonly a patronymic, i.e. derived from the father's first name. For example, when a man called Karl has a daughter called Anna and a son called Magnús, their full names will typically be Anna Karlsdóttir ("Karl's daughter") and Magnús Karlsson ("Karl's son"). The name is not changed upon marriage.

== Slavic world ==
Slavic countries are noted for having masculine and feminine versions for many (but not all) of their names. In most countries the use of a feminine form is obligatory in official documents as well as in other communication, except for foreigners. In some countries only the male form figures in official use (Bosnia and Herzegovina, Croatia, Montenegro, Serbia, Slovenia), but in communication (speech, print) a feminine form is often used.

=== Bulgaria ===
Bulgarian names usually consist of three components – given name, patronymic (based on father's name), family name.

Given names have many variations, but the most common names have Christian/Greek (e.g. Maria, Ivan, Christo, Peter, Pavel), Slavic (Ognyan, Miroslav, Tihomir) or Protobulgarian (Krum, Asparukh) (pre-Christian) origin. Father's names normally consist of the father's first name and the "-ov" (male) or "-ova" (female) or "-ovi" (plural) suffix.

Family names usually also end with the "-ov", "-ev" (male) or "-ova", "-eva" (female) or "-ovi", "-evi" (plural) suffix.

In many cases (depending on the name root) the suffixes can be also "-ski" (male and plural) or "-ska" (female); "-ovski", "-evski" (male and plural) or "-ovska", "-evska" (female); "-in" (male) or "-ina" (female) or "-ini" (plural); etc.

The meaning of the suffixes is similar to the English word "of", expressing membership in/belonging to a family. For example, the family name Ivanova means a person belonging to the Ivanovi family.

A father's name Petrov means son of Peter.

Regarding the different meaning of the suffixes, "-ov", "-ev"/"-ova", "-eva" are used for expressing relationship to the father and "-in"/"-ina" for relationship to the mother (often for orphans whose father is dead).

=== Czechia and Slovakia ===
Names of Czech people consist of given name (křestní jméno) and surname (příjmení). Usage of the second or middle name is not common. Feminine names are usually derived from masculine ones by a suffix -ová (Nováková) or -á for names being originally adjectives (Veselá), sometimes with a little change of original name's ending (Sedláčková from Sedláček or Svobodová from Svoboda). Women usually change their family names when they get married. The family names are usually nouns (Svoboda, Král, Růžička, Dvořák, Beneš), adjectives (Novotný, Černý, Veselý) or past participles of verbs (Pospíšil). There are also a couple of names with more complicated origin which are actually complete sentences (Skočdopole, Hrejsemnou or Vítámvás). The most common Czech family name is Novák / Nováková.

In addition, many Czechs and some Slovaks have German surnames due to mixing between the ethnic groups over the past thousand years. Deriving women's names from German and other foreign names is often problematic since foreign names do not suit Czech language rules, although most commonly -ová is simply added (Schmidtová; umlauts are often, but not always, dropped, e.g. Müllerová), or the German name is respelled with Czech spelling (Šmitová). Hungarian names, which can be found fairly commonly among Slovaks, can also be either left unchanged (Hungarian Nagy, fem. Nagyová) or respelled according to Czech/Slovak orthography (masc. Naď, fem. Naďová).

=== Poland ===
In Poland and most of the former Polish–Lithuanian Commonwealth, surnames first appeared during the late Middle Ages. They initially denoted the differences between various people living in the same town or village and bearing the same name. The conventions were similar to those of English surnames, using occupations, patronymic descent, geographic origins, or personal characteristics. Thus, early surnames indicating occupation include Karczmarz ("innkeeper"), Kowal ("blacksmith"), "Złotnik" ("gold smith") and Bednarczyk ("young cooper"), while those indicating patronymic descent include Szczepaniak ("Son of Szczepan), Józefowicz ("Son of Józef), and Kaźmirkiewicz ("Son of Kazimierz"). Similarly, early surnames like Mazur ("the one from Mazury") indicated geographic origin, while ones like Nowak ("the new one"), Biały ("the pale one"), and Wielgus ("the big one") indicated personal characteristics.

In the early 16th century, (the Polish Renaissance), toponymic names became common, especially among the nobility. Initially, the surnames were in a form of "[first name] z ("de", "of") [location]". Later, most surnames were changed to adjective forms, e.g. Jakub Wiślicki ("James of Wiślica") and Zbigniew Oleśnicki ("Zbigniew of Oleśnica"), with masculine suffixes -ski, -cki, -dzki and -icz or respective feminine suffixes -ska, -cka, -dzka and -icz on the east of Polish–Lithuanian Commonwealth. Names formed this way are adjectives grammatically, and therefore change their form depending on sex; for example, Jan Kowalski and Maria Kowalska collectively use the plural Kowalscy.

Names with masculine suffixes -ski, -cki, and -dzki, and corresponding feminine suffixes -ska, -cka, and -dzka became associated with noble origin. Many people from lower classes successively changed their surnames to fit this pattern. This produced many Kowalskis, Bednarskis, Kaczmarskis and so on.

A separate class of surnames derive from the names of noble clans. These are used either as separate names or the first part of a double-barrelled name. Thus, persons named Jan Nieczuja and Krzysztof Nieczuja-Machocki might be related. Similarly, after World War I and World War II, many members of Polish underground organizations adopted their war-time pseudonyms as the first part of their surnames. Edward Rydz thus became Marshal of Poland Edward Śmigły-Rydz and Zdzisław Jeziorański became Jan Nowak-Jeziorański.

=== Russia ===
A full Russian name consists of personal (given) name, patronymic, and family name (surname).

Most Russian family names originated from patronymics, that is, father's name usually formed by adding the adjective suffix -ov(a) or -ev(a). Contemporary patronymics, however, have a substantive suffix -ich for masculine and the adjective suffix -na for feminine.

For example, the proverbial triad of most common Russian surnames follows:

- Ivanov (son of Ivan),
- Petrov (son of Peter),
- Sidorov (son of Sidor).

Feminine forms of these surnames have the ending -a:

- Ivanova (daughter of Ivan),
- Petrova (daughter of Peter),
- Sidorova (daughter of Sidor).

Such a pattern of name formation is not unique to Russia or even to the Eastern and Southern Slavs in general; quite common are also names derived from professions, places of origin, and personal characteristics, with various suffixes (e.g. -in(a) and -sky (-skaya)).

Professions:

- kuznets (smith) → Kuznetsov—Kuznetsova
- portnoi (tailor) → Portnov—Portnova
- pastukh (shepherd) → Pastukhov—Pastukhova.

Places of origin:

- Moskva (Moscow) → Moskvin—Moskvina, Moskovsky—Moskovskaya,
- Smolensk → Smolensky—Smolenskaya,
- Riazan → Riazanov—Riazanova, Riazantsev—Riazantseva.

Personal characteristics:

- tolsty (stout, fat) → Tolstov—Tolstova, Tolstoy—Tolstaya,
- nos (nose) → Nosov—Nosova,
- sedoi (grey-haired or -headed) → Sedov—Sedova.

A considerable number of "artificial" names exists, for example, those given to seminary graduates; such names were based on Great Feasts of the Orthodox Church or Christian virtues.

Great Orthodox Feasts:

- rozhdestvo (Christmas) → Rozhdestvensky—Rozhdestvenskaya,
- voskresenie (Resurrection) → Voskresensky—Voskresenskaya,
- uspenie (Assumption) → Uspensky—Uspenskaya.

Christian virtues:

- philagathos (one who loves goodness) → Dobrolubov—Dobrolubova, Dobrolubsky—Dobrolubskaya,
- philosophos (one who loves wisdom) → Lubomudrov—Lubomudrova,
- theophilos (one who loves God) → Bogolubov—Bogolubova.

Many freed serfs were given surnames after those of their former owners. For example, a serf of the Demidov family might be named Demidovsky, which translates roughly as "belonging to Demidov" or "one of Demidov's bunch".

Grammatically, Russian family names follow the same rules as other nouns or adjectives (names ending with -oy, -aya are grammatically adjectives), with exceptions: some names do not change in different cases and have the same form in both genders (for example, Sedykh, Lata).

=== Ukraine and Belarus ===
Ukrainian and Belarusian names evolved from the same Old East Slavic and Ruthenian language (western Rus') origins. Ukrainian and Belarusian names share many characteristics with family names from other Slavic cultures. Most prominent are the shared root words and suffixes. For example, the root koval (blacksmith) compares to the Polish kowal, and the root bab (woman) is shared with Polish, Slovak, and Czech. The suffix -vych (son of) corresponds to the South Slavic -vic, the Russian -vich, and the Polish -wicz, while -sky, -ski, and -ska are shared with both Polish and Russian, and -ak with Polish.

However some suffixes are more uniquely characteristic to Ukrainian and Belarusian names, especially: -chuk (Western Ukraine), -enko (all other Ukraine) (both son of), -ko (little [masculine]), -ka (little [feminine]), -shyn, and -uk. See, for example, Mihalko, Ukrainian Presidents Leonid Kravchuk, and Viktor Yushchenko, Belarusian President Alexander Lukashenko, or former Soviet diplomat Andrei Gromyko. Such Ukrainian and Belarusian names can also be found in Russia, Poland, or even other Slavic countries (e.g. Croatian general Zvonimir Červenko), but are due to importation by Ukrainian, Belarusian, or Rusyn ancestors.

=== South Slavs ===
==== Endings in -ić and -ič ====
Surnames of some South Slavic groups such as Serbs, Croatian Serbs, Montenegrins, and Bosniaks traditionally end with the suffixes "-ić" and "-vić" (often transliterated to English and other western languages as "ic", "ich", "vic" or "vich". The v is added in the case of a name to which "-ić" is appended would otherwise end with a vowel, to avoid double vowels with the "i" in "-ić".) These are a diminutive indicating descent i.e. "son of". In some cases the family name was derived from a profession (e.g. blacksmith – "Kovač" → "Kovačević").

An analogous ending is also common in Slovenia. As the Slovene language does not have the softer consonant "ć", in Slovene words and names only "č" is used. So that people from the former Yugoslavia need not change their names, in official documents "ć" is also allowed (as well as "Đ / đ"). Thus, one may have two surname variants, e.g.: Božič, Tomšič (Slovene origin or assimilated) and Božić, Tomšić (roots from the Serbo-Croat language continuum area). Slovene names ending in -ič do not necessarily have a patrimonial origin.

In general family names in all of these countries follow this pattern with some family names being typically Serbian, some typically Croat and yet others being common throughout the whole linguistic region.

Children usually inherit their fathers' family name. In an older naming convention which was common in Serbia up until the mid-19th century, a person's name would consist of three distinct parts: the person's given name, the patronymic derived from the father's personal name, and the family name, as seen, for example, in the name of the language reformer Vuk Stefanović Karadžić.

Official family names do not have distinct male or female forms, except in North Macedonia, though a somewhat archaic unofficial form of adding suffixes to family names to form female form persists, with -eva, implying "daughter of" or "female descendant of" or -ka, implying "wife of" or "married to". In Slovenia the feminine form of a surname ("-eva" or "-ova") is regularly used in non-official communication (speech, print), but not for official IDs or other legal documents.

Bosniak Muslim names follow the same formation pattern but are usually derived from proper names of Islamic origin, often combining archaic Islamic or feudal Turkish titles i.e. Mulaomerović, Šabanović, Hadžihafizbegović, etc. Also related to Islamic influence is the prefix Hadži- found in some family names. Regardless of religion, this prefix was derived from the honorary title which a distinguished ancestor earned by making a pilgrimage to either Christian or Islamic holy places; Hadžibegić, being a Bosniak Muslim example, and Hadžiantić an Orthodox Christian one.

In Croatia where tribal affiliations persisted longer, Lika, Herzegovina etc., originally a family name, came to signify practically all people living in one area, clan land or holding of the nobles. The Šubić family owned land around the Zrin River in the Central Croatian region of Banovina. The surname became Šubić Zrinski, the most famous being Nikola Šubić Zrinski.

In Montenegro and Herzegovina, family names came to signify all people living within one clan or bratstvo. As there exists a strong tradition of inheriting personal names from grandparents to grandchildren, an additional patronymic usually using suffix -ov had to be introduced to make distinctions between two persons bearing the same personal name and the same family name and living within same area. A noted example is Marko Miljanov Popović, i.e. Marko, son of Miljan, from Popović family.

Due to discriminatory laws in the Austro-Hungarian Empire, some Serb families of Vojvodina discarded the suffix -ić in an attempt to mask their ethnicity and avoid heavy taxation.

The prefix Pop- in Serbian names indicates descent from a priest, for example Gordana Pop Lazić, i.e. descendant of Pop Laza.

Some Serbian family names include prefixes of Turkish origin, such as Uzun- meaning tall, or Kara-, black. Such names were derived from nicknames of family ancestors. A famous example is Karađorđević, descendants of Đorđe Petrović, known as Karađorđe or Black Đorđe.

==== Endings -ov, -ec, -ikj and -ski ====
In North Macedonia, the most popular suffix today is "-ski", such as Stojanovski with the feminine form being "-ska". Other popular suffixes are "-ov/-ova", "ev/eva" for example Jovanov and Kochev, and "ikj" (иќ), similar to "ič", mostly from those who are from Serbian descent. Another suffix is -ec for example in the last name Nebrezhanec.

==== Slovenia ====
Slovenes have a great variety of surnames, most of them differentiated according to region. Surnames ending in -ič are by far less frequent than among Croats and Serbs. There are typically Slovenian surnames ending in -ič, such as Blažič, Stanič, Marušič. Many Slovenian surnames, especially in the Slovenian Littoral, end in -čič (Gregorčič, Kocijančič, Miklavčič, etc.), which is uncommon for other South Slavic peoples (except the neighboring Croats, e.g. Kovačić, Jelačić, Kranjčić, etc.). On the other hand, surname endings in -ski and -ov are rare, they can denote a noble origin (especially for the -ski, if it completes a toponym) or a foreign (mostly Czech) origin. One of the most typical Slovene surname endings is -nik (Rupnik, Pučnik, Plečnik, Pogačnik, Podobnik) and other used surname endings are -lin (Pavlin, Mehlin, Ahlin, Ferlin), -ar (Mlakar, Ravnikar, Smrekar Tisnikar) and -lj (Rugelj, Pucelj, Bagatelj, Bricelj). Many Slovenian surnames are linked to Medieval rural settlement patterns. Surnames like Novak (literally, "the new one") or Hribar (from hrib, hill) were given to the peasants settled in newly established farms, usually in high mountains. Peasant families were also named according to the owner of the land which they cultivated: thus, the surname Kralj (King) or Cesar (Emperor) was given to those working on royal estates, Škof (Bishop) or Vidmar to those working on ecclesiastical lands, etc. Many Slovenian surnames are named after animals (Medved – bear, Volk, Vovk or Vouk – wolf, Golob – pigeon, Strnad – yellowhammer, Orel – eagle, Lisjak – fox, or Zajec – rabbit, etc.) or plants Pšenica – wheat, Slak – bindweed, Hrast – oak, etc. Many are named after neighbouring peoples: Horvat, Hrovat, or Hrovatin (Croat), Furlan (Friulian), Nemec (German), Lah (Italian), Vogrin, Vogrič or Vogrinčič (Hungarian), Vošnjak (Bosnian), Čeh (Czech), Turk (Turk), or different Slovene regions: Kranjc, Kranjec or Krajnc (from Carniola), Kraševec (from the Karst Plateau), Korošec (from Carinthia), Kočevar or Hočevar (from the Gottschee county).

===== Use of feminine surnames in Slovenia =====
In Slovenia last name of a female is the same as the male form in official use (identification documents, letters). In speech and descriptive writing (literature, newspapers) a female form of the last name is regularly used. Examples: Novak (m.) & Novakova (f.), Kralj (m.) & Kraljeva (f.), Mali (m.) & Malijeva (f.). Usually surenames on -ova are used together with the title/gender: gospa Novakova (Mrs. Novakova), gospa Kraljeva (Mrs. Kraljeva), gospodična Malijeva (Miss Malijeva, if unmarried), etc. or with the name. So we have Maja Novak on the ID card and Novakova Maja (extremely rarely Maja Novakova) in communication; Tjaša Mali and Malijeva Tjaša (rarely Tjaša Malijeva); respectively. Diminutive forms of last names for females are also available: Novakovka, Kraljevka. As for pronunciation, in Slovenian there is some leeway regarding accentuation. Depending on the region or local usage, you may have either Nóvak & Nóvakova or, more frequently, Novák & Novákova. Accent marks are normally not used.

If the name has no suffix, it may or may not have a feminine version. Sometimes it has the ending changed (such as the addition of -a). In the Czech Republic and Slovakia, suffixless names, such as those of German origin, are feminized by adding -ová (for example, Schusterová).

== Arabic-speaking countries ==
The given name is always followed by the father's first name, then the father's family surname. Some surnames have a prefix of ibn- (ould- in Mauritania) meaning "son of". The surnames follow similar rules defining a relation to a clan, family, place etc. Some Arab countries have differences due to historic rule by the Ottoman Empire or due to being a different minority.

A large number of Arabic last names start with "Al-" which means "The"

Arab States of the Persian Gulf: Names mainly consist of the person's name followed by the father's first name connected by the word "ibn" or "bin" (meaning "son of"). The last name either refers to the name of the tribe the person belongs to, or to the region, city, or town he/she originates from. In exceptional cases, members of the royal families or ancient tribes mainly, the title (usually H.M./H.E., Prince, or Sheikh) is included in the beginning as a prefix, and the first name can be followed by four names, his father, his grandfather, and great – grandfather, as a representation of the purity of blood and to show the pride one has for his ancestry.

In Arabic-speaking Levantine countries (Jordan, Lebanon, Palestine, Syria) it's common to have family names associated with a certain profession or craft, such as "Al-Haddad"/"Haddad" which means "Blacksmith" or "Al-Najjar"/"Najjar" which means "Carpenter".

== Indian Subcontinent ==
=== India ===
In India, surnames are placed as last names or before first names, which often denote: village of origin, caste, clan, office of authority their ancestors held, or trades of their ancestors. The use of surnames is a relatively new convention, introduced during British colonisation. Typically, parts of northern India follow English-speaking Western naming conventions by having a given name followed by a surname. This is not necessarily the case in southern India, where people may adopt a surname out of necessity when migrating or travelling abroad.

The largest variety of surnames is found in the states of Maharashtra and Goa, which numbers more than the rest of India together. Here surnames are placed last, the order being: the given name, followed by the father's name, followed by the family name. The majority of surnames are derived from the place where the family lived, with the 'kar' (Marathi and Konkani) suffix, for example, Mumbaikar, Punekar, Aurangabadkar, Tendulkar, Parrikar, Mangeshkar, Mahendrakar. Another common variety found in Maharashtra and Goa are the ones ending in 'e'. These are usually more archaic than the 'Kar's and usually denote medieval clans or professions like Rane, Salunkhe, Gupte, Bhonsle, Ranadive, Rahane, Hazare, Apte, Satpute, Shinde, Sathe, Londhe, Salve, Kale, Gore, Godbole, etc.

In Andhra Pradesh and Telangana, surnames usually denote family names. It is easy to track family history and the caste they belonged to using a surname.

In Odisha and West Bengal, surnames denote the caste they belong. There are also several local surnames like Das, Patnaik, Mohanty, Jena etc.

In Kerala, surnames denote the caste they belong. There are also several local surnames like Nair, Menon, Panikkar etc.

It is a common in Kerala, Tamil Nadu, and some other parts of South India that the spouse adopts her husband's first name instead of his family or surname name after marriage. The son or daughter also adopts the father's name as his or her last name

In Rajasthan, the community name and sometimes the gotra or clan name are used as surnames. Usage of community name as surname include: Charan, Jat, Meena, Rajput, etc. Sometimes, the faith name (for example: Jain) can also be used as a surname.

India is a country with numerous distinct cultural and linguistic groups. Thus, Indian surnames, where formalized, fall into seven general types.

Surnames are based on:

- Patronymics and ancestry, whereby the father's name or an ancestor's given name is used in its original form or in a derived form (e.g. Baranwal or Barnwal or Burnwal derived from the ancestor Ahibaran).
- Occupations (Chamar, Patel or Patil, meaning Village Headman, Gandhi, Kamath, Kulkarni, who used to maintain the accounts and records and collect taxes, Kapadia, Nadkarni, Patwardhan, Patwari, Shenoy, etc.) and priestly distinctions (Bhat, Bhattar, Sastry, Trivedi, Shukla, Chaturvedi, Twivedi, Purohit, Mukhopadhyay); Business people: Shetty, Rai, Hegde is commonly used in ruling castes of the Karnataka coastal belt. In addition, many Parsi, Bohra and Gujarati families have used English trade names as last names since the 18th and 19th centuries (Contractor, Engineer, Builder).
- Clan names (Pillai, Gounder, Goud, Gowda, Boyar, Parmar, Sindhi, Vaish, Reddy, Meena, Nair, Nadar and Naidu) are not surnames but suffixes to first names to indicate their clan or caste.
- Place names or names derived from places of ancestral origin (Aluru, Marwari, Gavaskar, Gaonkar, Mangeshkar, Kapoor, Wamankar, Kokradi, Karnad, Sandhu, Medukonduru, Rachapalli).
- The father's first name is used as a surname in certain Southern states, such as Kerala, Karnataka and Tamil Nadu. Spouses and children take on the first name of the father as their last name or 'surname'.
- Muslim surnames generally follow the same rules used in Pakistan. Khan is among the most popular surnames, often signifying Afghan/Central Asian descent.
- Bestowed titles or other honorifics: titles bestowed by kings, rajas, nawabs and other nobles before the British Raj (Wali, Rai, Rao, Babu, Thakur, Gain/Gayen, Panicker, Vallikappen, Moocken, etc.) and those bestowed by the British (Rai, Bahadur).

The convention is to write the first name followed by middle names and surname. It is common to use the father's first name as the middle name or last name even though it is not universal. In some Indian states like Maharashtra, official documents list the family name first, followed by a comma and the given names.

In modern times, in urban areas at least, this practice is not universal and some wives either suffix their husband's surname or do not alter their surnames at all. In some rural areas, particularly in North India, wives may also take a new first name after their nuptials. Children inherit their surnames from their father.

Jains generally use Jain, Shah, Firodia, Singhal or Gupta as their last names. Sikhs generally use the words Singh ("lion") and Kaur ("princess") as surnames added to the otherwise unisex first names of men and women, respectively. It is also common to use a different surname after Singh in which case Singh or Kaur are used as middle names (Montek Singh Ahluwalia, Surinder Kaur Badal). The tenth Guru of Sikhism ordered (Hukamnama) that any man who considered himself a Sikh must use Singh in his name and any woman who considered herself a Sikh must use Kaur in her name. Other middle names or honorifics that are sometimes used as surnames include Kumar, Dev, Lal, and Chand.

The modern-day spellings of names originated when families translated their surnames to English, with no standardization across the country. Variations are regional, based on how the name was translated from the local language to English in the 18th, 19th and 20th centuries during British rule. Therefore, it is understood in the local traditions that Baranwal and Barnwal represent the same name derived from Uttar Pradesh and Punjab respectively. Similarly, Tagore derives from Bengal while Thakur is from Hindi-speaking areas. The officially recorded spellings tended to become the standard for that family. In the modern times, some states have attempted standardization, particularly where the surnames were corrupted because of the early British insistence of shortening them for convenience. Thus Bandopadhyay became Banerji, Mukhopadhay became Mukherji, Chattopadhyay became Chatterji, etc. This coupled with various other spelling variations created several surnames based on the original surnames. The West Bengal Government now insists on re-converting all the variations to their original form when the child is enrolled in school.

Some parts of Sri Lanka, Thailand, Nepal, Myanmar, and Indonesia have similar patronymic customs to those of India.

=== Nepal ===
Nepali surnames are divided into three origins; Indo-Aryan languages, Tibeto-Burman languages and indigenous origins. Surnames of Khas community contains toponyms as Ghimire, Dahal, Pokharel, Sapkota from respective villages, occupational names as (Adhikari, Bhandari, Karki, Thapa). Many Khas surnames includes suffix as -wal, -al as in Katwal, Silwal, Khanal, Khulal, Rijal. Kshatriya titles such as Bista, Kunwar, Rana, Rawal, Shah, Thakuri, Chand, were taken as surnames by various Kshetri and Thakuris. Khatri Kshetris share surnames with mainstream Pahari Bahuns. Other popular Chhetri surnames include Basnyat, Bogati, Budhathoki, Khadka, Mahat, Raut. Similarly, Brahmin surnames such as Acharya, Joshi, Pandit, Sharma, Upadhyay were taken by Pahari Bahuns. Bahuns bear distinct surnames as Kattel, and share surnames with mainstream Bahuns. Other Bahun surnames include Aryal, Bhattarai, Banskota, Chaulagain, Devkota, Dhakal, Gyawali, Koirala, Mainali, Pandey, Panta, Paudel, Regmi, Subedi, Lamsal, and Dhungel. Khas-Dalits surnames include Kami, Bishwakarma or B.K., Damai, Mijar, Pariyar, Sarki. Newar groups of multiethnic background bears both Indo-Aryan surnames (like Shrestha, Pradhan) and indigenous surnames like Maharjan, Dangol. Magars bear surnames derived from Khas peoples such as Baral, Budhathoki, Lamichhane, Thapa and indigenous origins as Gharti, Pun, Pulami. Other Himalayan Mongoloid castes bears Tibeto-Burmese surnames like Gurung, Tamang, Thakali, Sherpa. Various Kiranti ethnic group contains many Indo-Aryan surnames of Khas origin which were awarded by the government of Khas peoples. These surnames are Rai, Subba depending upon job and position hold by them. Terai community consists both Indo-Aryan and Indigenous origin surnames. Terai Brahmins bears surnames as Jha. Nepalese Muslims bears Islamic surnames such as Ali, Ansari, Begum, Khan, Mohammad, Pathan. Other common Terai surnames are Kayastha.

=== Pakistan ===
In Pakistan, surnames reflect a mixture of ethnic, tribal, ancestral, and religious identities rather than a single national naming convention. The naming structure has been shaped by centuries of Arabic, Persian, Central Asian, and South Asian influences, and includes both inherited family names and traditional patronymics.

Arabic-derived surnames such as Syed, Siddiqui, Naqvi, Abbasi, and Farooqi often indicate claimed lineage from early Islamic figures or ancestry from the Middle East. Many Pakistanis also carry surnames linked to Central Asia and Iran, including Mir, Mirza, Bukhari, Kashani, Ghaznavi, and Qizilbash.

Tribal and clan-based surnames remain common among Pashtuns, Baloch, Sindhi, and Punjabi communities. Examples include Afridi, Khattak, Yousafzai, Bugti, Mengal, Leghari, Awan, and Janjua. Such names often denote the bearer's ancestral tribe, lineage, or region of origin. Toponymic surnames derived from South Asian cities or regions, such as Delhvi, Bilgrami, Lakhnavi, and Barelvi, reflect ancestral migration from northern India during or after the Partition.

In official documents, Pakistani names usually follow the pattern: "Given name, son/daughter of [father's name], of [tribe or family name], resident of [place]". In everyday use, people in Pakistan generally address one another by their given or first names rather than by surnames. The use of surnames is more common in formal documents or when indicating family, tribal, or ancestral affiliation.

== Sinosphere ==
In modern Chinese, Japanese, Korean, Taiwanese, and Vietnamese, traditional personal name is followed the Eastern order, with the family name is placed before the given names, although this order may not be observed in translation. Generally speaking, Chinese, Korean, and Vietnamese names do not alter their order in English (such as Mao Zedong and Chiang Kai-shek; Kim Jong-il and Park Chung Hee; Ho Chi Minh and Ngo Dinh Diem) but Japanese names do (Shinzo Abe). However, numerous exceptions exist, particularly for people born in English-speaking countries such as Yo-Yo Ma.

This is sometimes systematized but not all are conformant:

- In Olympics' events, following the Use and rules of each participant name > TV Name “Switching” in the document Language Guidelines & Participant Names of the Olympic Data Feed, athletes of China, Korea, (Note: Included South Korea, North Korea, and the special unified team Korea.) Chinese Taipei (Taiwan), Hong Kong, Macau, (Note: Currently can compete in only Paralympics.) and Japan are displayed their names on TV graphics in the Eastern order, while athletes who have been sharing same traditional naming structure but representing other countries, are displayed in the Western order.
  - Athletes from Japan were previously displayed in the Western name order such as "Yuzuru HANYU", until the PyeongChang 2018. Since the Tokyo 2020, Japan has requested that names be displayed in the Eastern order, such as "HANYU Yuzuru", by being added to the list of countries in TV Name “Switching”.
  - For athletes of Vietnam, names are still displayed at the Olympics in the Western order, as Vietnam has not yet been included in the TV Name “Switching” list. The fact that Vietnam is not a strong nation in Olympics may also be a significant disadvantage in this matter.
- In BWF's tournaments, almost badminton players of China, Chinese Taipei, Korea, Hong Kong, someone of Vietnam, and some players have Chinese descent in Malaysia and Singapore, are displayed in the Eastern order, while Japan and others are displayed in the Western order.

For example about some badminton players, with surnames are visually emphasized in all capital letters or bold:

Native full name (bolding surname)	Representing	Displaying on TV graphics	
Native full name (bolding surname)	Representing	Olympics	BWF's tournaments
**Shi** Yuqi	China	SHI Yuqi	**SHI** Yu Qi
**Chou** Tien-chen	Chinese Taipei	CHOU Tien-Chen	**CHOU** Tien Chen
Angus **Ng** Ka Long	Hong Kong	NG Ka Long Angus	**NG** Ka Long Angus
**An** Se-young	South Korea	AN Seyoung	**AN** Se Young
**Yamaguchi** Akane	Japan	YAMAGUCHI Akane	Akane **YAMAGUCHI**
**Soh** Wooi Yik	Malaysia	Wooi Yik SOH	**SOH** Wooi Yik
Aaron **Chia** Teng Fong	Malaysia	Aaron CHIA	Aaron **CHIA**
**Loh** Kean Yew	Singapore	Kean Yew LOH	**LOH** Kean Yew
Jason **Teh** Jia Heng	Singapore	Jason TEH	Jia Heng Jason **TEH**
**Nguyễn** Thuỳ Linh	Vietnam	Thuy Linh NGUYEN	**NGUYEN** Thuy Linh
**Nguyễn** Nhật	Ireland	Nhat NGUYEN	Nhat **NGUYEN**
**Zhang** Beiwen	United States	Beiwen ZHANG	Beiwen **ZHANG**

Chinese family names have many types of origins, some claiming dates as early as the legendary Yellow Emperor (2nd millennium BC):

- from the land or state that one lived in or awarded: Chen 陳 after the state of Chen, Cai 蔡 after the state of Cai;
- from the given name or posthumous name of one's ancestor: Zhuang 莊 after King Zhuang of Chu;
- from the nobility status or officer status of one's ancestor: Wang 王 (a king) or Shi 史 (a history-recording officer);
- and some other origins.

In history, some changed their surnames due to a naming taboo (from Zhuang 莊 to Yan 嚴 during the era of Liu Zhuang 劉莊) or when the imperial surname was awarded by the Emperor (the imperial surname Li was often bestowed on senior officers during the Tang dynasty).

In modern times, some Chinese adopt an English name in addition to their native given names: e.g., 李柱銘 (Li Zhùmíng) adopted the English name Martin Lee. Particularly in Hong Kong and Singapore, the convention is to write both names together: Martin Lee Chu-ming. Owing to the confusion this can cause, a further convention is sometimes observed of capitalizing the surname: Martin LEE Chu-ming. Sometimes, however, the Chinese given name is forced into the Western system as a middle name ("Martin Chu-ming Lee"); less often, the English given name is forced into the Chinese system ("Lee Chu-ming Martin").

In Japan, the civil law forces a common surname for every married couple, unless in a case of international marriage. In most cases, women surrender their surnames upon marriage, and use the surnames of their husbands. However, a convention that a man uses his wife's family name if the wife is an only child is sometimes observed. A similar tradition called ru zhui (入贅) is common among Chinese when the bride's family is wealthy and has no son but wants the heir to pass on their assets under the same family name. The Chinese character zhui (贅) carries a money radical (貝), which implies that this tradition was originally based on financial reasons. All their offspring carry the mother's family name. If the groom is the first born with an obligation to carry his own ancestor's name, a compromise may be reached in that the first male child carries the mother's family name while subsequent offspring carry the father's family name. The tradition is still in use in many Chinese communities outside mainland China, but largely disused in China because of social changes from communism. Due to the economic reform in the past decade, accumulation and inheritance of personal wealth made a comeback to the Chinese society. It is unknown if this financially motivated tradition would also come back to mainland China.

In Chinese, Korean, Vietnamese and Singaporean cultures, women keep their own surnames, while the family as a whole is referred to by the surnames of the husbands.

In Hong Kong, some women would be known to the public with the surnames of their husbands preceding their own surnames, such as Anson Chan Fang On Sang. Anson is an English given name, On Sang is the given name in Chinese, Chan is the surname of Anson's husband, and Fang is her own surname. A name change on legal documents is not necessary. In Hong Kong's English publications, her family names would have been presented in small cap letters to resolve ambiguity, e.g. Anson CHAN FANG On Sang in full or simply Anson Chan in short form.

In Macau, some people have their names in Portuguese spelt with some Portuguese style, such as Carlos do Rosario Tchiang.

Chinese women in Canada, especially Hongkongers in Toronto, would preserve their maiden names before the surnames of their husbands when written in English, for instance, Rosa Chan Leung, where Chan is the maiden name, and Leung is the surname of the husband.

In Chinese, Korean, and Vietnamese, surnames are predominantly monosyllabic (written with one character), though a small number of common disyllabic (or written with two characters) surnames exists (e.g. the Chinese name Ouyang, the Korean name Jegal and the Vietnamese name Tôn Thất).

Many Chinese, Korean, and Vietnamese surnames are of the same origin, but simply pronounced differently and even transliterated differently overseas in Western nations. For example, the common Chinese surnames Chen, Chan, Chin, Cheng and Tan, the Korean surname Jin, as well as the Vietnamese surname Trần are often all the same exact character 陳. The common Korean surname Kim is also the common Chinese surname Jin, and written 金. The common Mandarin surnames Lin or Lim (林) is also one and the same as the common Cantonese or Vietnamese surname Lâm and Korean family name Lim (written/pronounced as "Im" in South Korea). There are people with the surname of Hayashi (林) in Japan too. The common Chinese surname 李, translated to English as Lee, is, in Chinese, the same character but transliterated as Li according to pinyin convention. Lee is also a common surname of Koreans, and the character is identical. Conversely in Vietnam, around 30% of all have the surname Nguyen. This may be because when a new dynasty took power in Vietnam it was custom to adopt that dynasty's surname. The last dynasty in Vietnam was the Nguyen dynasty, so as a result, many people have this surname.

== Africa ==
=== Burundi and Rwanda ===
In Burundi and Rwanda, most, if not all surnames have God in it, for example, Hakizimana (meaning God cures), Nshimirimana (I thank God) or Havyarimana/Habyarimana (God gives birth). But not all surnames end with the suffix -imana. Irakoze is one of these (technically meaning Thank God, though it is hard to translate it correctly in English or probably any other language). Surnames are often different among immediate family members, as parents frequently choose unique surnames for each child, and women keep their maiden names when married. Surnames are placed before given names and frequently written in capital letters, e.g. HAKIZIMANA Jacques.

=== East Africa ===
In several Northeast Bantu languages such as Kamba, Taita and Kikuyu in Kenya the word "wa" (meaning "of") is inserted before the surname, for instance, Mugo wa Kibiru (Kikuyu) and Mekatilili wa Menza (Mijikenda).

=== Ethiopia and Eritrea ===
The patronymic custom in most of the Horn of Africa gives children the father's first name as their surname. The family then gives the child its first name. Middle names are unknown. So, for example, a person's name might be Bereket Mekonen . In this case, Bereket is the first name and Mekonen is the surname, and also the first name of the father.

The paternal grandfather's name is often used if there is a requirement to identify a person further, for example, in school registration. Also, different cultures and tribes use the father's or grandfather's given name as the family's name. For example, some Oromos use Warra Ali to mean families of Ali, where Ali, is either the householder, a father or grandfather.

In Ethiopia, the customs surrounding the bestowal and use of family names is as varied and complex as the cultures to be found there. There are so many cultures, nations or tribes, that currently there can be no one formula whereby to demonstrate a clear pattern of Ethiopian family names. In general, however, Ethiopians use their father's name as a surname in most instances where identification is necessary, sometimes employing both father's and grandfather's names together where exigency dictates.

Many people in Eritrea have Italian surnames, but all of these are owned by Eritreans of Italian descent.

=== Libya ===
Libya's names and surnames have a strong Islamic/Arab nature, with some Turkish influence from Ottoman Empire rule of nearly 400 years. Amazigh, Touareg and other minorities also have their own name/surname traditions. Due to its location as a trade route and the different cultures that had their impact on Libya throughout history, one can find names that could have originated in neighboring countries, including clan names from the Arabian Peninsula, and Turkish names derived from military rank or status (Basha, Agha).

== Other countries ==
=== Albania ===
A full Albanian name consists of a given name (Albanian: emër), patronymic (Albanian: atësi) and family name (Albanian: mbiemër), for example Agron Mark Gjoni. The patronymic is simply the given name of the individual's father, with no suffix added. The family name is typically a noun in the definite form or at the very least ends with a vowel or -j (an approximant close to -i). Many traditional last names end with -aj (previously -anj), which is more prevalent in certain regions of Albania and Kosovo. Family names are usually patrilineal, however, the mother's surname can be legally added if so wished by the parents.

Proper names in Albanian are fully declinable like any noun (e.g. Marinelda, genitive case i/e Marineldës "of Marinelda").

=== Armenia ===
Armenian surnames almost always have the ending (Armenian: յան) transliterated into English as -yan or -ian (spelled -ean (եան) in Western Armenian and pre-Soviet Eastern Armenian, of Ancient Armenian or Iranian origin, presumably meaning "son of"), though names with that ending can also be found among Persians and a few other nationalities. Armenian surnames can derive from a geographic location, profession, noble rank, personal characteristic or personal name of an ancestor. Armenians in the diaspora sometimes adapt their surnames to help assimilation. In Russia, many have changed -yan to -ov (or -ova for women). In Turkey, many have changed the ending to -oğlu (also meaning "son of"). In English and French-speaking countries, many have shortened their name by removing the ending (for example Charles Aznavour). In ancient Armenia, many noble names ended with the locative -t'si (example, Khorenatsi) or -uni (Bagratuni). Several modern Armenian names also have a Turkish suffix which appears before -ian/-yan: -lian denotes a placename; -djian denotes a profession. Some Western Armenian names have a particle Der, while their Eastern counterparts have Ter. This particle indicates an ancestor who was a priest (Armenian priests can choose to marry or remain celibate, but married priests cannot become a bishop). Thus someone named Der Bedrosian (Western) or Ter Petrosian (Eastern) is a descendant of an Armenian priest. The convention is still in use today: the children of a priest named Hagop Sarkisian would be called Der Sarkisian. Other examples of Armenian surnames: Adonts, Sakunts, Vardanyants, Rshtuni.

=== Azerbaijan ===
It was common for Azerbaijani names to have 3 components: given name, father's name and family name. However, in recent years it is becoming increasingly popular to only have 2 components: first name and surname.

While under Soviet rule, it was mandatory for Azerbaijanis to register their names, but most people did not have surnames. This was normally circumvented by taking the individual's father's name and adding a Russian suffixes such as "-yev"/"-ov" for men and "-yeva/-ova" for women (meaning "born of"). For example, from "Ali" we get "Aliyev" and "Aliyeva" and from "Husein" we get "Huseinov" and "Huseinova". However, as the Soviet era came to an end, many Azerbaijanis dropped these endings in an attempt to derussify. Some chose to replace these with traditional suffixes like "-zade" (Persian for "born of") and "-li/-lu" (Turkish for "with" or "belonging to"), "-oglu/-oghlu" (Turkish for "son of"). Some chose to drop the suffixes entirely.

=== Georgia ===
Most eastern Georgian surnames end with the suffix of "-shvili", Georgian for "child" or "offspring", e.g. Kartvelishvili, "son of Kartvel (Georgian)". Western Georgian surnames most commonly have the suffix "-dze", Georgian for "son", e.g. Labadze. Mingrelian surnames usually end in "-ia", "-ua" or "-ava". Other location-specific endings exist: in Svaneti "-iani", meaning "belonging to", or "hailing from", is common. In the eastern Georgian highlands common endings are "-uri" and "-uli". Some noble family names end in "-eli", meaning "of (someplace)". In Georgian, the surname is not normally used as the polite form of address; instead, the given name is used together with a title in the vocative case, denoted by -o. For instance, Nikoloz Kartvelishvili is politely addressed as bat'ono Nikoloz: "Sir (literally master of a feudal manor) Nikoloz". Women are addressed politely as kalbat'ono, literally "woman-master".

=== Greece and Cyprus ===
Greek surnames are most commonly patronymics. Occupation, characteristic, or ethnic background and location/origin-based surnames names also occur; they are sometimes supplemented by nicknames.

Commonly, Greek male surnames end in -s, which is the common ending for Greek masculine proper nouns in the nominative case. Exceptionally, some end in -ou, indicating the genitive case of this proper noun for patronymic reasons.

Although surnames are static today, dynamic and changing patronym usage survives in middle names in Greece where the genitive of the father's first name is commonly the middle name.

Because of their codification in the Modern Greek state, surnames have Katharevousa forms even though Katharevousa is no longer the official standard. Thus, the Ancient Greek name Eleutherios forms the Modern Greek proper name Lefteris, and former vernacular practice (prefixing the surname to the proper name) was to call John Eleutherios Leftero-giannis.

Modern practice is to call the same person Giannis Eleftheriou: the proper name is vernacular (and not Ioannis), but the surname is an archaic genitive. However, children are almost always baptised with the archaic form of the name so in official matters, the child will be referred to as Ioannis Eleftheriou and not Giannis Eleftheriou.

Female surnames are most often in the Katharevousa genitive case of a male name. This is an innovation of the Modern Greek state; Byzantine practice was to form a feminine counterpart of the male surname (e.g. masculine Palaiologos, Byzantine feminine Palaiologina, Modern feminine Palaiologou).

In the past, women would change their surname when married to that of their husband (again in the genitive case) signifying the transfer of "dependence" from the father to the husband. In earlier Modern Greek society, women were named with -aina as a feminine suffix on the husband's first name: "Giorgaina", "Mrs George", "Wife of George". Nowadays, a woman's legal surname does not change upon marriage, though she can use the husband's surname socially. Children usually receive the paternal surname, though in rare cases, if the bride and groom have agreed before the marriage, the children can receive the maternal surname.

Some surnames are prefixed with Papa-, indicating ancestry from a priest, e.g. Papageorgiou, the "son of a priest named George". Others, like Archi- and Mastro- signify "boss" and "tradesman" respectively.

Prefixes such as Konto-, Makro-, and Chondro- describe body characteristics, such as "short", "tall/long" and "fat". Gero- and Palaio- signify "old" or "wise".

Other prefixes include Hadji- (Χαντζή- or Χαντζι-) which was an honorific deriving from the Arabic Hadj or pilgrimage, and indicate that the person had made a pilgrimage (in the case of Christians, to Jerusalem) and Kara- which is attributed to the Turkish word for "black" deriving from the Ottoman Empire era. The Turkish suffix -oglou (derived from a patronym, -oğlu in Turkish) can also be found. Although they are of course more common among Greece's Muslim minority, they still can be found among the Christian majority, often Greeks or Karamanlides who were pressured to leave Turkey after the Turkish Republic was founded (since Turkish surnames only date to the founding of the Republic, when Atatürk made them compulsory).

Arvanitic surnames also exist; an example is Tzanavaras or Tzavaras, from the Arvanitic word çanavar or çavar meaning "brave" (pallikari in Greek).

Most Greek patronymic suffixes are diminutives, which vary by region. The most common Hellenic patronymic suffixes are:

- -poulos/-poulou, which has a Latin origin (pullus) and means "the little", representing "the son of ...", so if a man's family name is "Christopoulos", it means that his father was named "Christos". This suffix is very widespread throughout Greece and is originally from the Peloponessus in particular.
- -idis/iadis/antis The suffix -idis (often transliterated -ides in English and French) is the oldest in use. Zeus, for example, was also referred to as Cronides ("son of Cronus"). A common suffix in Byzantium around Bithynia and Byzantine Thrace (Constantinople), also used by Pontic Greeks and Caucasus Greeks in the Pontic Alps, northeast Anatolia, Georgia, and the former Russian Caucasus region of Kars Oblast e.g. Mikhailidis, the "clan of Michael"
- -akis/-aki is associated primarily with Crete and the Aegean Islands. It is a patronymic signifying "little" and/or "son"; therefore Theodorakis is "little Theodore".

Others, less common, are:

- -atos/-atou (from Cephallonia and other Ionian Islands)
- -as/-a/-ekas/kas (from Epirus) and Greek Macedonia
- -ellis/-elli (from Lesvos Island)
- -eas/akos/oggonas (from Mani)
- -oglou (from the Turkish suffix for "child of" used by both genders)
- -ou (genitive, from Cyprus)
- -ou/ides/kos (from Macedonia)
- -ekas/las (from Epirus)

Either the surname or the given name may come first in different contexts; in newspapers and in informal uses, the order is given name + surname, while in official documents and forums (tax forms, registrations, military service, school forms), the surname is often listed or said first.

=== Hungary ===
In Hungarian, like Asian languages but unlike most other European ones (see French and German above for exceptions), the family name is placed before the given names. This usage does not apply to non-Hungarian names, for example "Tony Blair" will remain "Tony Blair" when written in Hungarian texts.

Names of Hungarian individuals, however, appear in Western order in English writing.

=== Indonesia ===
Indonesians comprise more than 600 ethnic groups. Not all of these groups traditionally have surnames, and in the populous Java surnames are not common at all – regardless of which one of the six officially recognized religions the name carrier profess, nor there are a legally separate group of surnames. For instance, a Christian Javanese woman named Agnes Mega Rosalin has three forenames and no surname. "Agnes" is her Christian name, but "Mega" can be the first name she uses and the name which she is addressed with. "Rosalin" is only a middle name. Nonetheless, Indonesians are well aware of the custom of family names, which is known as marga or fam, and such names have become a specific kind of identifier. People can tell what a person's heritage is by his or her family or clan name.

- The various ethnicities of Batak people from North Sumatra are known for their strict tradition of preserving their family names, which are actually clan names. See Marga (Batak) for details.
- The matrilineal clan names of the Minangkabau people are passed down from mothers to their children. Minangkabau is the largest matrilineal society in the world.
- The Minahasan people of North Sulawesi have an extensive list of surnames, such as Toar, Lumimuut, Emor, Muntuan, Nayoan, Wenas and Luntungan.
- The Ambonese people of the Maluku Islands have family names such as Lawalata, Matulessy and Latumahina.
- The various ethnicities of Dayak people from the provinces in Kalimantan have surnames such as Dau and Narang.
- The Bugis people from South Sulawesi have surnames such as Mappanyukki, Mallarangeng and Matalatta.
- Among the Toraja people of South Sulawesi, common surname elements include Rante–, Pong–, Allo–, –bua, –linggi. Examples: Rantedatu, Ranteallo, Pongrambu, Pongtiku, Pongrangga, Allodatu, Randebua, Tanabua, Tarukbua, Datubua, Allobua, Senolinggi.

Javanese people are the largest ethnicity (about 30%) in Indonesia, and most do not have any surname. There are some individuals, especially the old generation, who have only one name, such as "Suharto" and "Sukarno". These are not only common with the Javanese but also with other Indonesian ethnic groups who do not have the tradition of surnames. If, however, they are Muslims, they might opt to follow Arabic naming customs, but Indonesian Muslims do not automatically follow Arabic name traditions.

Most Chinese Indonesians substituted their Chinese (sur)names with Indonesian-sounding (sur)names -- many of these are brand new names -- due to political pressure from 1965 to 1998 under Suharto's regime. Thus, Chinese-Indonesian also sometimes doesn't have family name in their Indonesianized-name (on paper), although most have Chinese family name and personal name (as an informal name), many third-generations-and-below Chinese Indonesian don't necessarily use their original/ancestral family names anymore, but adopt new Indonesianized-last name (surname).

In conjunction with migration to Europe or America, Indonesians without surnames often adopt a surname based on some family name or middle name. The forms for visa application many Western countries use, has a square for writing the last name which cannot be left unfilled by the applicant. Thus, following the example of someone named "Agnes Mega Rosalin" above, she will be forced to assign Rosalin (her middle name) as her last name when writing paperwork in Western countries.

People with single-word names are given several choice. For example someone with fullname "Agnes" could write "Agnes LNU" (Last Name Unknown), "FNU Agnes" (First Name Unknown), or "Agnes Agnes" when buying tickets, applying visa, and so forth. The name has been considered a source of humor when Fnu Lnu has been mistaken for the actual name of a person.. While in her ID card and passport her name is simply one word.

According to "Permendagri No. 73 Tahun 2022" by Indonesian Ministry of Home Affairs, the provisions for recording names in residency documents (birth certificate, ID card, passport, etc.) should be: (1) easy to read, doesn't have bad connotation, isn't open for multiple interpretations, (2) have a maximum of 60 characters, including space, (3) have to be at least 2 words. Also the law prohibits non-Latin characters, abbreviations, numbers and punctuations, and educational/religious titles in the ID and family card. If this law is strictly followed by all citizen, it means since 2022 there would be no more Indonesian children with single names. The law doesn't force people to adopt family names, just force everyone to have at least 2 words in their name. The mechanism of surnames from parents to children is never written in law, and it's open to personal/cultural preference whether Indonesian parents are naming their children using various Western convention, East Asian/Middle East convention, their culture's convention, or no system at all.

=== Iranian/Persian/Kazan ===
Persian last names may be:

- Simple nouns; e.g. Afshar ("Of Afsharid dynasty"), Bahar, Khayyam
- Noun plus a suffix; e.g. Golzaar (Gol + -zaar), Amouzgaar (Amouz + -gaar), Daadgar (Daad + -gar)
- More complex compound nouns; e.g. Bolurforushan (Bolur + forush + -an), Ahmedinejad (Ahmed + -i + -nejad), Farshchian (Farsh + -chi + -an)
- Two or more nouns; e.g. Mostafavi Musavi Khomeini, Hashemi Rafsanjani

Suffixes include: -an (plural suffix), -i ("of"), -zad/-zadeh ("born of"), -pur ("son of"), -nejad ("from the race of"), -nia ("descendant of"), -mand ("having or pertaining to"), -vand ("succeeding"), -far ("holder of"), -doost ("-phile"), -khah ("seeking of"), -manesh ("having the manner of"), -ian/-yan, -gar and -chi ("whose vocation pertains").

An example is names of geographical locations plus "-i": Irani ("Iranian"), Gilani ("of Gilan province"), Tabrizi ("of the city of Tabriz").

Another example is last names that indicate relation to religious groups such as Zoroastrian (e.g. Goshtaspi, Namiranian, Azargoshasp), Jewish (e.g. Yaghubian [Jacobean], Hayyem [Life], Shaul [Saul]) or Muslim (e.g. Alavi, Islamnia, Montazeri)

Last names are arbitrary; their holder need not to have any relation with their meaning.

Traditionally in Iran, the wife does not take her husband's surname, although children take the surname of their father. Individual reactions notwithstanding, it is possible to call a married woman by her husband's surname. This is facilitated by the fact that English words "Mrs.", "Miss", "Woman", "Lady" and "Wife (of)" in a polite context are all translated into "خانم" (Khaanom). Context, however, is important: "خانم گلدوست" (Khaanom Goldust) may, for instance, refer to the daughter of Mr. Goldust instead of his wife. When most of Iranian surnames are used with a name, the name will be ended with a suffix _E or _ie (of) such as Hasan_e roshan (Hasan is name and roshan is surname) that means Hasan of Roshan or Mosa_ie saiidi (Muses of saiidi). The _e is not for surname and it is difficult to say it is a part of surname.

=== Italy ===
Italy has around 350,000 surnames. Most of them derive from the following sources: patronym or ilk (e.g. Francesco di Marco, "Francis, son of Mark" or Eduardo de Filippo, "Edward belonging to the family of Philip"), occupation (e.g. Enzo Ferrari, "Heinz (of the) Blacksmiths"), personal characteristic (e.g. nicknames or pet names like Dario Forte, "Darius the Strong"), geographic origin (e.g. Elisabetta Romano, "Elisabeth from Rome") and objects (e.g. Carlo Sacchi, "Charles Bags"). The two most common Italian family names, Russo and Rossi, mean the same thing, "Red", possibly referring to the hair color.

Both Western and Eastern orders are used for full names: the given name usually comes first, but the family name may come first in administrative settings; lists are usually indexed according to the last name.

Since 1975, women have kept their own surname when married, but until recently (2000) they could have added the surname of the husband according to the civil code, although it was a very seldom-used practice. In recent years, the husband's surname cannot be used in any official situation. In some unofficial situations, sometimes both surnames are written (the proper first), sometimes separated by in (e.g. Anna Mauri in Crivelli) or, in case of widows, ved. (vedova).

=== Latvia ===
Latvian male surnames usually end in -s, -š or -is whereas the female versions of the same names end in -a or -e or s in both unmarried and married women.

Before the emancipation from serfdom (1817 in Courland, 1819 in Vidzeme, 1861 in Latgale) only noblemen, free craftsmen or people living in towns had surnames. Therefore, the oldest Latvian surnames originate from German or Low German, reflecting the dominance of German as an official language in Latvia till the 19th century. Examples: Meijers/Meijere (German: Meier, farm administrator; akin to Mayor), Millers/Millere (German: Müller, miller), Šmits/Šmite (German: Schmidt, smith), Šulcs/Šulce, Šulca (German: Schultz or Schulz, constable), Ulmanis (German: Ullmann, a person from Ulm), Godmanis (a God-man), Pētersons (son of Peter). Some Latvian surnames, mainly from Latgale are of Polish or Belarusian origin by changing the final -ski/-cki to -skis/-ckis, -czyk to -čiks or -vich/-wicz to -vičs, such as Sokolovkis/Sokolovska, Baldunčiks/Baldunčika or Ratkevičs/Ratkeviča.

Most Latvian peasants received their surnames in 1826 (in Vidzeme), in 1835 (in Courland), and in 1866 (in Latgale). Diminutives were the most common form of family names. Examples: Kalniņš/Kalniņa (small hill), Bērziņš/Bērziņa (small birch).

Nowadays many Latvians of Slavic descent have surnames of Russian, Belarusian, or Ukrainian origin, for example Volkovs/Volkova or Antoņenko.

=== Lithuania ===
Lithuanian names follow the Baltic distinction between male and female suffixes of names, although the details are different. Male surnames usually end in -a, -as, -aitis, -ys, -ius, or -us, whereas the female versions change these suffixes to -aitė, -ytė, -iūtė, and -utė respectively (if unmarried), -ienė (if married), or -ė (not indicating the marital status). Some Lithuanians have names of Polish or another Slavic origin, which are made to conform to Lithuanian by changing the final -ski to -skas, such as Sadauskas, with the female version bein -skaitė (if unmarried), -skienė (if married), or -skė (not indicating the marital status).

=== Malta ===
Different cultures have their impact on the demographics of the Maltese islands, and this is evident in the various surnames Maltese people bear nowadays. There are very few Maltese surnames per se: the few that originate from Maltese places of origin include Chircop (Kirkop), Lia (Lija), Balzan (Balzan), Valletta (Valletta), and Sciberras (Xebb ir-Ras Hill, on which Valletta was built). The village of Munxar, on Gozo, is characterised by the majority of its population having one of two surnames, either Curmi or DeBrincat. In Gozo, the surnames Bajada and Farrugia are also common.

==== Customs ====
In line with traditional Christian practice, women generally assume their husband's surname after legal marriage, and this is passed on to any children the couple may bear. Some women opt to retain their old name, for professional/personal reasons, or combine their surname with that of their husband.

==== List of surnames by language of origin ====
===== Sicilian and Italian surnames =====
Sicilian and Italian surnames are common due to the close vicinity to Malta. Sicilians were the first to colonise the Maltese islands. Common examples include Azzopardi, Bonello, Cauchi, Farrugia, Gauci, Rizzo, Schembri, Tabone, Vassallo, Vella.

===== Siculo-Arabic surnames =====
Arabic surnames occur in part due to the early presence of the Arabs in Malta. Common examples include Sammut, Camilleri, Zammit, and Xuereb.

===== French surnames =====
Common examples include Depuis, Montfort, Monsenuier, Tafel.

===== English surnames =====
English surnames exist for a number of reasons, but mainly due to migration as well as Malta forming a part of the British Empire in the 19th century and most of the 20th. Common examples include Bone, Harding, Atkins, Mattocks, Smith, Jones, Woods, Turner, Littlejohn.

===== German surnames =====
Surnames from foreign countries from the Middle Ages include German, such as von Brockdorff, Hyzler, and Schranz.

===== Spanish surnames =====
Common surnames of Spanish origin include Abela, Galdes, Herrera, and Guzman.

===== Greek surnames =====
Many of the earliest Maltese surnames are Siculo-Greek, e.g. Cilia, Calleja, Brincat, Cauchi. Much less common are recent surnames from Greece; examples include Dacoutros, and Trakosopoulos.

===== Jewish surnames =====
The original Jewish community of Malta and Gozo has left no trace of their presence on the islands since they were expelled in January 1493.

=== Mongolia ===
Mongolians do not use surnames in the way that most Westerners, Chinese or Japanese do. Since the socialist period, patronymics – then called ovog, now called etsgiin ner – are used instead of a surname. If the father's name is unknown, a matronymic is used. The patro- or matronymic is written before the given name. Therefore, if a man with given name Tsakhia has a son, and gives the son the name Elbegdorj, the son's full name is Tsakhia Elbegdorj. Very frequently, the patronymic is given in genitive case, i.e. Tsakhiagiin Elbegdorj. However, the patronymic is rather insignificant in everyday use and usually just given as an initial – Ts. Elbegdorj. People are normally just referred to and addressed by their given name (Elbegdorj guai – Mr. Elbegdorj), and if two people share a common given name, they are usually just kept apart by their initials, not by the full patronymic.

Since 2000, Mongolians have been officially using clan names – ovog, the same word that had been used for the patronymics before – on their IDs. Many people chose the names of the ancient clans and tribes such Borjigin, Besud, Jalair, etc. Also many extended families chose the names of the native places of their ancestors. Some chose the names of their most ancient known ancestor. Some just decided to pass their own given names (or modifications of their given names) to their descendants as clan names. Some chose other attributes of their lives as surnames. Gürragchaa chose Sansar (Cosmos). Clan names precede the patronymics and given names, e.g. Besud Tsakhiagiin Elbegdorj. These clan names have a significance and are included in Mongolian passports.

=== Myanmar (Burma) ===
People from Myanmar or Burmese, have no family names. This, to some, is the only known Asian people having no family names at all. Some of those from Myanmar or Burma, who are familiar with European or American cultures, began to put to their younger generations with a family name – adopted from the notable ancestors. For example, Ms. Aung San Suu Kyi is the daughter of the late Father of Independence General Aung San; Hayma Ne Win, is the daughter of the famous actor Kawleikgyin Ne Win etc.

=== Philippines ===
Until the middle of the 19th century, there was no standardization of surnames in the Philippines. There were native Filipinos without surnames, others whose surnames deliberately did not match that of their families, as well as those who took certain surnames simply because they had a certain prestige, usually ones related to the Roman Catholic religion, such as de los Santos ("of the saints") and de la Cruz ("of the cross"), or of local nobility such as of rajahs or datus.

On 21 November 1849, the Spanish Governor-General of the Philippines, Narciso Clavería y Zaldúa, decreed an end to these arbitrary practices, the systematic distribution of surnames to Filipinos without prior surnames and the universal implementation of the Spanish naming system. This produced the Catálogo alfabético de apellidos ("Alphabetical Catalogue of Surnames"), which listed permitted surnames with origins in Spanish, Filipino, and Hispanized Chinese words, names, and numbers. Thus, many Spanish-sounding Filipino surnames are not surnames common to the rest of the Spanish-speaking world. The book contained many words coming from Spanish and the Philippine languages such as Tagalog, as well as many Basque and Catalan surnames.

The colonial authorities implemented this decree because many Christianized Filipinos assumed religious names. There soon were too many people surnamed de los Santos ("of the saints"), de la Cruz ("of the cross"), del Rosario ("of the Rosary") etc., which made it difficult for the Spanish colonists to control the Filipino people, and most importantly, to collect taxes. These extremely common names were also banned by the decree unless the name has been used by a family for at least four generations. This Spanish naming custom also countered the native custom before the Spanish period, wherein siblings assumed different surnames. Clavería's decree was enforced to different degrees in different parts of the colony.

Because of this implementation of Spanish naming customs, of the arrangement "given name + paternal surname + maternal surname", in the Philippines, a Spanish surname does not necessarily denote Spanish ancestry.

In practice, the application of this decree varied from municipality to municipality. Most municipalities received surnames starting with only one initial letter; in others, this was not well enforced. For example, the majority of residents of the island of Banton in the province of Romblon have surnames starting with F such as Fabicon, Fallarme, Fadrilan, and Ferran. Other examples are most cities and towns in Albay, Catanduanes, Ilocos Sur and Marinduque, where the majority of their residents have surnames beginning with a particular letter.

Thus, although perhaps a majority of Filipinos have Spanish surnames, such a surname does not indicate Spanish ancestry. In addition, most Filipinos currently do not use Spanish accented letters in their Spanish derived names. The lack of accents in Filipino Spanish has been attributed to the lack of accents on the predominantly American typewriters after the United States gained control of the Philippines.

The vast majority of Filipinos follow a naming system in the American order (i.e. given name + middle name + surname), which is the reverse of the Spanish naming order (i.e. given name + paternal surname + maternal surname). Children take the mother's surname as their middle name, followed by their father's as their surname; for example, a son of Juan de la Cruz and his wife María Agbayani may be David Agbayani de la Cruz. Women usually take the surnames of their husband upon marriage, and consequently lose their maiden middle names; so upon her marriage to David de la Cruz, the full name of Laura Yuchengco Macaraeg would become Laura Macaraeg de la Cruz. Their maiden last names automatically become their middle names upon marriage.

There are other sources for surnames. Many Filipinos also have Chinese-derived surnames, which in some cases could indicate Chinese ancestry. Many Hispanized Chinese numerals and other Hispanized Chinese words, however, were also among the surnames in the Catálogo alfabético de apellidos. For those whose surname may indicate Chinese ancestry, analysis of the surname may help to pinpoint when those ancestors arrived in the Philippines. A Hispanized Chinese surname such as Cojuangco suggests an 18th-century arrival while a Chinese surname such as Lim suggests a relatively recent immigration. Some Chinese surnames such as Tiu-Laurel are composed of the immigrant Chinese ancestor's surname as well as the name of that ancestor's godparent on receiving Christian baptism.

In the predominantly Muslim areas of the southern Philippines, adoption of surnames was influenced by Islamic religious terms. As a result, surnames among Filipino Muslims are largely Arabic-based, and include such surnames as Hassan and Haradji.

There are also Filipinos who, to this day, have no surnames at all, particularly if they come from indigenous cultural communities.

==== Naming customs in the Philippines ====
Prior to the establishment of the Philippines as a US territory during the earlier part of the 20th century, Filipinos usually followed Iberian naming customs. However, upon the promulgation of the Family Code of 1987, Filipinos formalized adopting the American system of using their surnames.

A common Filipino name will consist of the given name (mostly 2 given names are given), the initial letter of the mother's maiden name and finally the father's surname (i.e. Lucy Anne C. de Guzman). Also, women are allowed to retain their maiden name or use both her and her husband's surname as a double-barreled surname, separated by a dash. This is common in feminist circles or when the woman holds a prominent office (e.g. Gloria Macapagal Arroyo, Miriam Defensor Santiago). In more traditional circles, especially those who belong to the prominent families in the provinces, the custom of the woman being addressed as "Mrs. Husband's Full Name" is still common.

For widows, who chose to marry again, two norms are in existence. For those who were widowed before the Family Code, the full name of the woman remains while the surname of the deceased husband is attached. That is, Maria Andres, who was widowed by Ignacio Dimaculangan will have the name Maria Andres viuda de Dimaculangan. If she chooses to marry again, this name will still continue to exist while the surname of the new husband is attached. Thus, if Maria marries Rene de los Santos, her new name will be Maria Andres viuda de Dimaculangan de los Santos.

However, a new norm is also in existence. The woman may choose to use her husband's surname to be one of her middle names. Thus, Maria Andres viuda de Dimaculangan de los Santos may also be called Maria A.D. de los Santos.

Children will however automatically inherit their father's surname if they are considered legitimate. If the child is born out of wedlock, the mother will automatically pass her surname to the child, unless the father gives a written acknowledgment of paternity. The father may also choose to give the child both his parents' surnames if he wishes (that is Gustavo Paredes, whose parents are Eulogio Paredes and Juliana Angeles, while having Maria Solis as a wife, may name his child Kevin S. Angeles-Paredes.

In some Tagalog regions, the norm of giving patronyms, or in some cases matronyms, is also accepted. These names are of course not official, since family names in the Philippines are inherited. It is not uncommon to refer to someone as Juan anak ni Pablo (John, the son of Paul) or Juan apo ni Teofilo (John, the grandson of Theophilus).

=== Romania ===
In Romania, like in most of Europe, it is customary for a child to take his father's family name, and a wife to take her husband's last name. However, this is not compulsory – spouses and parents are allowed to choose other options too, as the law is flexible (see Art. 282, Art. 449 Art. 450. of the Civil Code of Romania).

Until the 19th century, the names were primarily of the form "[given name] [father's name] [grandfather's name]". The few exceptions are usually famous people or the nobility (boyars). The name reform introduced around 1850 had the names changed to a western style, most likely imported from France, consisting of a given name followed by a family name.

As such, the name is called prenume (French prénom), while the family name is called nume or, when otherwise ambiguous, nume de familie ("family name"). Although not mandatory, middle names are common.

Historically, when the family name reform was introduced in the mid-19th century, the default was to use a patronym, or a matronym when the father was dead or unknown. A common convention was to append the suffix -escu to the father's name, e.g. Anghelescu ("Anghel's child") and Petrescu ("Petre's child"). (The -escu seems to come from Latin -iscum, thus being cognate with Italian -esco and French -esque.) Another common convention was to append the suffix -eanu to the name of the place of origin, e.g. Munteanu ("from the mountains") and Moldoveanu ("from Moldova"). These uniquely Romanian suffixes strongly identify ancestral nationality.

There are also descriptive family names derived from occupations, nicknames, and events, e.g. Botezatu ("baptised"), Barbu ("bushy bearded"), Prodan ("foster"), Bălan ("blond"), Fieraru ("smith"), Croitoru ("tailor"), "Păcuraru" ("shepherd").

Romanian family names remain the same regardless of the sex of the person.

Although given names appear before family names in most Romanian contexts, official documents invert the order, ostensibly for filing purposes. Correspondingly, Romanians occasionally introduce themselves with their family names first, e.g. a student signing a test paper in school.

Romanians bearing names of non-Romanian origin often adopt Romanianised versions of their ancestral surnames. For example, Jurovschi for Polish Żurowski, or Popovici for Serbian Popović ("son of a priest"), which preserves the original pronunciation of the surname through transliteration. In some cases, these changes were mandated by the state.

=== Turkey ===
In Turkey, following the Surname Law imposed in 1934 in the context of Atatürk's Reforms, every family living in Turkey was given a family name. The surname was generally selected by the elderly people of the family and could be any Turkish word (or a permitted word for families belonging to official minority groups).

Some of the most common family names in Turkey are Yılmaz ('undaunted'), Doğan ('falcon'), Şahin ('hawk'), Yıldırım ('thunderbolt'), Şimşek ('lightning'), Öztürk ('purely Turkish').

Patronymic surnames do not necessarily refer to ancestry, or in most cases cannot be traced back historically. The most usual Turkish patronymic suffix is –oğlu; –ov(a), –yev(a) and –zade also occur in the surnames of Azeri or other Turkic descendants.

Official minorities like Armenians, Greeks, and Jews have surnames in their own mother languages. The Armenian families living in Turkey usually have Armenian surnames and generally have the suffix –yan, –ian, or, using Turkish spelling, -can. Greek descendants usually have Greek surnames which might have Greek suffixes like –ou, –aki(s), –poulos/poulou, –idis/idou, –iadis/iadou or prefixes like papa–. The Sephardic Jews who were expelled from Spain and settled in Turkey in 1492 have both Jewish/Hebrew surnames, and Spanish surnames, usually indicating their native regions, cities or villages back in Spain, like De Leon or Toledano.
