= Bajada =

Bajada or La Bajada are derived from Spanish, meaning "the descent", and may refer to:

== People ==
- Anthony Bajada (born 1902), British American inventor
- Clint Bajada (born 1982), Maltese TV and radio personality
- Emilio Bajada (born 1914), Italian mathematician
- Roberta Bajada (born 1985), Maltese writer
- Roderick Bajada (born 1983), Maltese footballer
- Shaun Bajada (born 1983), Maltese footballer
- Thomas Bajada (born 1994), Maltese politician
- Toni Bajada (16th century), Maltese spy

== Places ==
- La Bajada, Catamarca, Argentina
- La Bajada, Dallas, Texas, United States
- La Bajada, New Mexico, United States (and the escarpment of the Caja del Rio)
- La Bajada, San Luis, Argentina

== Other ==
- Bajada (festival) a festival common to the Canary islands
- Bajada (geography), a compound alluvial fan
