= Bogati =

Bogati may refer to:

- Bogați, a commune in Argeș County, Romania
- Bogati (surname)
