= Katte =

Katte is a surname. Notable people with the surname include:

- Adriaan Katte (1900–1991), Dutch field hockey player
- Hans Hermann von Katte (1704–1730), Prussian Army lieutenant
- Walter Katte (1830–1917), British-born American civil engineer

== See also ==
- Kattel
