= Żurowski =

Żurowski (feminine Żurowska) is a Polish surname. Notable people with the surname include:

- Adam Żurowski (1929–2016), Polish geodesist and academic
- Agnes Zurowski (1920–2013), Canadian baseball player
- Kazimierz Żurowski (1909–1987), Polish archaeologist
- Maciej Żurowski (1915–2003), Polish historian
- Teresa Zurowski (born 1956), Polish-Austrian handball player
