= Ghaznavi =

Ghaznavi may refer to:

- Ghaznavi (surname), a surname
- Ghaznavids, a Muslim (Turkic) dynasty
- Ghaznavi, Iran, village in Iran
- Ghaznavi (missile), a Pakistani missile
- Ghaznavi Force, an auxiliary Special Operations unit formed by the Pakistan Army

== See also ==
- Ghazni (disambiguation)
