= Ghazni (disambiguation) =

Ghazni (formerly Ghazna) is a city in central Afghanistan. It may also refer to:

== Places ==
- Ghazni Province, Afghanistan, of which the city is the capital
- Ghazni District, district surrounding the city
- Citadel of Ghazni, fortress in Ghazni
- Ghazni under the Ghaznavids, history of the city under the Ghaznavid dynasty
- Ghazni Minarets, minaret towers in Ghazni
- Ghazni Airport, airport in Ghazni
- Ghazni University, public university in Afghanistan
- Forward Operating Base Ghazni, International Security Assistance Force base in Afghanistan
- Ghazni Khel, union council in Khyber Pakhtunkhwa, Pakistan

== People ==
- Ghazni (Bagram captive), one of the first Bagram captives to face trial under Afghan justice, see Misri Gul
- Abu Ishaq Ibrahim of Ghazna, Samanid governor of Ghazni
- Arslan-Shah of Ghazna (d. 1118), Ghaznavid ruler
- Böritigin of Ghazni, Samanid governor of Ghazni
- Ibrahim of Ghazna (1033–1099), Ghaznavid ruler
- Ismail of Ghazni, emir of Ghazni, brother of Mahmud
- Khusrau Shah of Ghazna (1121–1160), Ghaznavid ruler
- Mahmud of Ghazni (971–1030), the most prominent ruler of the Ghaznavid Empire
- Masʽud I of Ghazni (998–1040), Ghaznavid ruler, son of Mahmud
- Mas'ud III of Ghazni, Ghaznavid ruler
- Mawdud of Ghazni (died 1050), Ghaznavid ruler
- Muhammad of Ghazni (died 1041), Ghaznavid ruler, son of Mahmud
- Sanai or Abu-l-Majd Majdud Sana’i of Ghazna (1080–1131/1141), Persian poet from Ghazni
- Shir-Zad of Ghazna, Ghaznavid ruler
- Toghrul of Ghazna, Ghaznavid general

== Others ==
- Ghazni prison escape, 2015 Taliban prison break

== See also ==
- Ghaznavi (disambiguation)
- Ghajini (disambiguation), alternate transliteration of Ghazni
- Battle of Ghazni (disambiguation)
- List of governors of Ghazni
