= Devkota =

Devkota देवकोटा
- Language: Nepali, Doteli, Kumaoni

Origin
- Language: Khas language
- Origin: Khasa kingdom
- Derivation: Devkot

Other names
- Derivatives: Jaisi Devkota, Devkota Khatri
- See also: Dhakal, Bhattarai, Adhikari, Subedi, Dhungana, Sapkota

Devkota (Nepali: देवकोटा) is a surname used by Khas Bahun communities of Nepal. Notable people with the surname include:

- Laxmi Prasad Devkota (1909–1959), Nepali writer
- Bachaspati Devkota, Nepalese communist leader
- Rajeshwor Devkota, Nepalese political leader
- Rishi Devkota, Nepalese communist leader
- Upendra Devkota, Nepalese neurosurgeon
- Dinesh Chandra Devkota, Nepalese Engineer and former Vice-Chairman of National Planning Commission
- Khim Lal Devkota, Nepalese politician
- Krishna Jwala Devkota, Nepalese journalist
- Manita Devkota, Miss Universe Nepal 2018 and Top 10 Miss Universe 2018
- Ratnakar Devkota, Writer, Reporter, Historian from jumla karnali
