= Stenen =

Stenen ("made of stone") can refer to:

- Stenen, Saskatchewan, a village in Canada
- De Stenen Tafel, a restaurant in the Netherlands
- Ole Stenen, a Norwegian Nordic skier
- Den vita stenen, a Swedish children's book
- Års-stenen, the Aars stone, a runestone in Denmark
