= Chaulagain =

Nepalese surname

Chaulagain Nepali: चौलागाईं
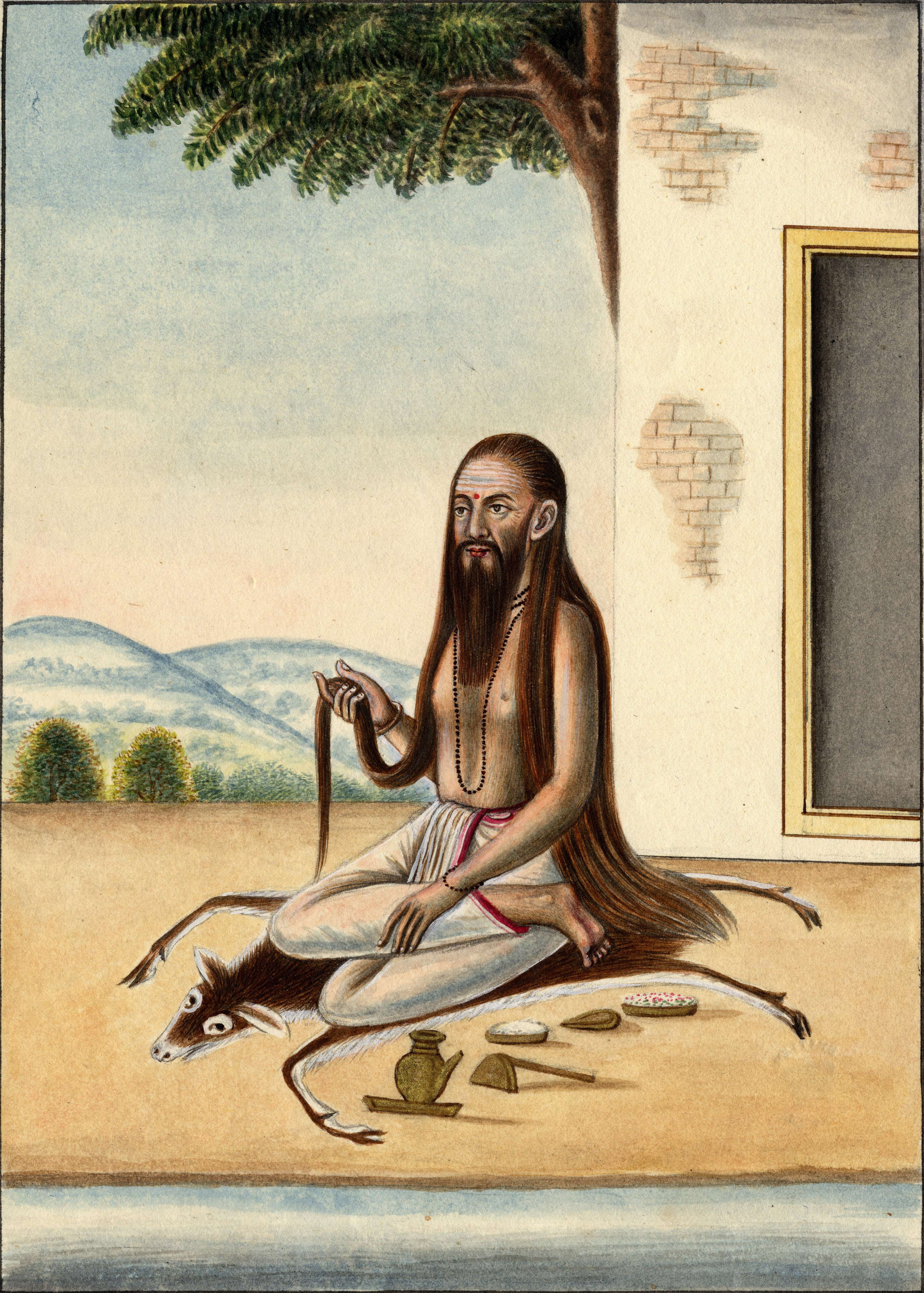
- Bharadwaja, gotra (paternal lineage) of people with Chaulagain surname
- Language: Nepali, Doteli, Kumaoni

Origin
- Language: Nepali
- Region of origin: Khasa kingdom

Other names
- Variant forms: Chamlagain, Chaulagai, Chamrel
- See also: Chapagain, Chalise

Chaulagain (Nepali: चौलागाईं) is a surname in Nepal. The people of this surname belongs to Bahun (Hill Brahmin) and Chhetri caste. Chaulagain belongs to Bharadvaja gotra. Alternative spellings include Chamlagain, Chaulagai and Chamrel (commonly used by Chaulagains from southern Lalitpur area).

== Origin ==
The surname is considered to be originated in Sinja valley of Jumla region. The people living in Chaundila Gau (Chaundila village) are said to be later called as Chaulagain. In fourteenth century, during the Khas Empire and then in the Jumla kingdom, it was customary to provide wages to royal priests, astrologers, Pandits, army, officers, allies etc. by the kings. There are records of people with Chaulagain surname receiving the wages from the first king of Kalyal dynasty of Jumal kingdom, Baliraja. The surname is then said to spread all around Nepal from Jumla region. Currently, there are many chaulagains residing in Nijgadh(Bara), Hetauda, etc who reportedly migrated from jyamire(kavrepalanchok).

== Notable people ==
Notable people with the name include:

- Kamal Prasad Chaulagain, Nepalese politician
- Madhu Kumar Chaulagain, Nepalese politician and lawyer
- Sajja Chaulagain (born 1997), Nepalese singer
- Satya Raj Chaulagain (born 1990), Nepalese film director

== See also ==
- Chapagain
- Karki (surname)
- Siwakoti
