= Rishi Lamichhane =

Nepalese movie director

- ऋषि लामिछाने
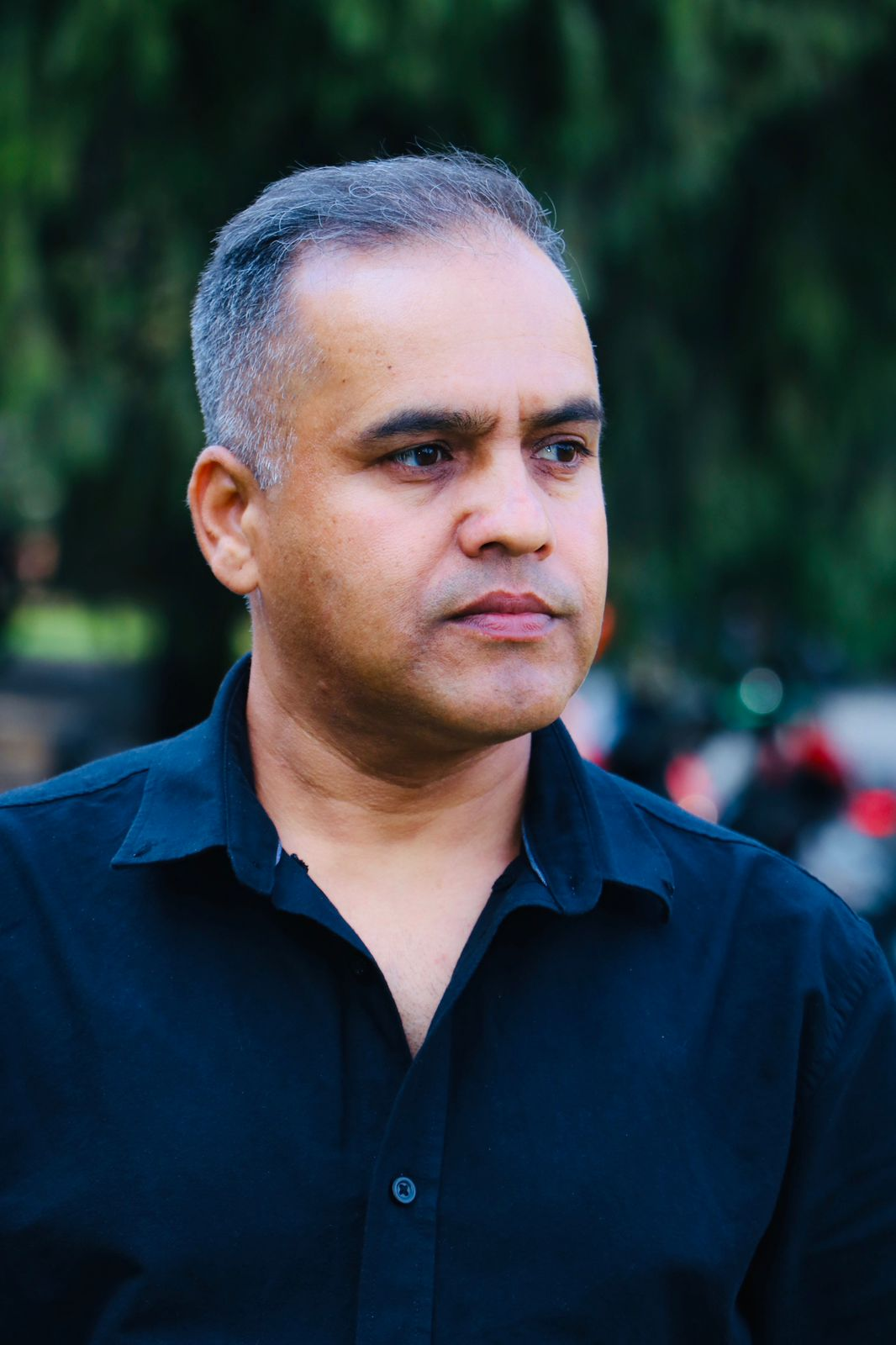
- Born: July 7 Nepal
- Occupations: Director, Writer, Producer
- Years active: 2001 - Present
- Known for: Movie, television serial director, Writer, Producer
- Notable work: Aafno Manche Aafnai Huncha, Huwaldar Suntali, Shreeman Shreemati
- Spouse: Sarita Lamichhane

Rishi Lamichhane (Nepali: ऋषि लामिछाने) is a Nepalese movie and television serial director. He was born on July 7 in Nepal. He was the director of Nepali movie Huwaldar Suntali.

== About ==
Director Rishi Lamichhane is a well-known movie and television serial director in Nepal. He began his career in 2001 AD with the film "Kahin Milan Kahin Bichhod." In his directorial career, "Shreeman Shreemati," "Kismat 2," "Hawaldar Suntali," and "Aafno Manche Aafnai Huncha" are some popular movies. Additionally, he is active in television serials and has directed the longest-running television serial in Nepal, named "Parichaya," which started in 2004 AD. Other popular television serials under his direction include "Maiti," "Sapnako Mahal," "Durga," and "Dristhi." Lamichane has received various national awards, such as the Nefta Award, Nepal Film Technical Association Award, and Rapti Music Award.

== Filmography ==
=== Movie ===
SN	Movie name	Release date	Credit	ref
1	Shreeman Shreemati	2011 AD	Director	
2	Kahin Milan Kahin Bichod	2005 AD	Director	
3	Kismat 2	2016 AD	Director	
4	Hamro Maya Juni Juni lai	2011	Director	
5	Hawaldar Suntali	2015 AD	Director	
6	Aafno Manche Aafnai Huncha	2010 AD	Director	
8	Sorry La	2019 AD	Director	
9	Khabardar	2008 AD	Story Writer	

=== Television serial ===
SN	Serial name	Television name	ref
1	Parichaya	Nepal television	
2	Dristi	Ramailo television	
3	Sapana Ko Mahal	Nepal Television	
4	Maiti	Nepal Television	
5	Bhumika	Nepal television	
7	Sajaya	Nepal Television	

== Award ==
SN	Award title	Award category	Movie name	Resault
1	Nepal motion picture Award - 2062 B.S	Best Director	kahi milan kahi bichhod	
2	Nefta Award - 2067 B.S	Best Director	Aafno Manche Aafnai Huncha	
3	D Cine Award - 2071 B.S	Best Director	Hawaldar Suntali	
4	Box office Film Award - 2067BS	Best Director	Aafno Manche Aafnai Huncha	
5	Nepal Film Technical Association Award - 2067BS	Best Story Writer	Aafno Manche Aafnai Huncha	
6	Samjhana Digital Film Award -2067BS	Best Director	Aafno Manche Aafnai Huncha	
