= Baranwal =

Community of India

Baranwal (also spelled Barnwal, Burnwal, Varnwal, Warnwal or Barnawal) is a part of the larger Bania community of northern India. They originated in north India in the regions today comprising Uttar Pradesh, Bihar, Uttarakhand, Jharkhand and West Bengal. However, today they have a diaspora spread across India and the world.

The community mostly resides in the regions of Etawah, Azamgarh, Gorakhpur, Kushinagar, Deoria, Ghazipur, Bihar, Jharkhand, and West Bengal.

== See also ==
- Baranwal (surname)
