= Tafel =

Tafel is a surname, and may refer to:

- Albert Tafel (1876–1935) German geographer, doctor and explorer
- Edgar Tafel (1912–2011), American architect
- Gustav Tafel (1830–1909), German-born colonel in the Union Army
- Julius Tafel (1862–1918), German chemist
- Tristan Tafel (born 1990), Canadian freestyle skier

Tafel may also refer to:

- Tafel, a Namibian beer.
- Tafel equation for electrochemical reaction rates
- De Stenen Tafel, restaurants in the Netherlands
- Die Tafel / Die Tafeln (plural) is the name of a food bank/network of food banks in Germany. de:Tafel (Organisation)
