= Chitrapur =

- Village
- Interactive map of Chitrapur
- Country: India
- State: Karnataka

Government
  - Body: Gram panchayat

Languages
  - Official: Kannada
- Time zone: UTC+5:30 (IST)
- ISO 3166 code: IN-KA
- Vehicle registration: KA
- Website: karnataka.gov.in

Chitrapur is a village in Bhatkal Taluka, Uttar Kannada District, Karnataka, India.

Chitrapur Mutt, the religious headquarters of the Chitrapur Saraswat Brahmins, is in this town. The town, initially a small village was improved upon under the guidance of the Saraswat swamis.

The small village of Chitrapur was built with a road in the middle and houses and gardens on both sides. It became a miniature municipality with street lamps lit during the night and roads swept clean.

The Mathadhipatis also constructed the Shiv-Ganga Sarovar at Chitrapur, the erection of a storeyed building at Panchavati, starting of schools for boys and girls. They helped build a post office with quarters for the post-master and a vegetable market at Chitrapur.

The Chitrapur Math has many ancient Hindu statues in a museum.

== See also ==
- Saraswat Brahmins
- Goud Saraswat Brahmins
- Shirali
- Chitrapur Math
- Mangalore
- Kokradi
- Shenvi
