= Ghajini =

Ghajini may refer to:

- Ghajini (2005 film), an Indian Tamil film
- Ghajini (2008 film), an Indian Hindi remake of the Tamil film
  - Ghajini (soundtrack), by A. R. Rahman
  - Ghajini – The Game, 2008 third-person action game based on the 2008 film Ghajini
- Mahmud of Ghazni, whose name Ghazni is pronounced "Ghajini" in Tamil

== See also ==
- Ghazni (disambiguation)
- Ghajinikanth, a 2018 Indian Tamil film
