= Baranwal (surname) =

Baranwal is an Indian surname. Notable people with the surname include:

- Rita Baranwal, Indian-American engineer
- Vinod Kumar Baranwal (born 1969), Indian judge
- Virendra Kumar Baranwal (born 1941), Indian poet

== See also ==
- Baranwal
