= Battle of Ghazni (disambiguation) =

The Battle of Ghazni took place in 1839 during the First Anglo-Afghan War.

Battle of Ghazni may also refer to:

- Battle of Ghazni (998)
- Battle of Ghazni (1117)
- Battle of Ghazni (1148)
- Battle of Ghazni (1151)
- Battle of Ghazni (2018)

== See also ==
- Ghazni (disambiguation)
