= Lamichhane =

Lamichhane (Nepali: लामिछाने) is a surname found in Nepal. Used by Bahun, Chhetri, Magar and Gurung, the name originates from Lamachhini village in west central Nepal. Some notable Lamichhane include:

- Gopal Chandra Lamichhane (b. 1974), Nepalese film director
- Jiba Lamichhane, Nepalese businessman
- Khagendra Lamichhane, Nepalese actor, writer and director
- Rabi Lamichhane, Nepalese politician and journalist
- Sandeep Lamichhane (b. 2000), Nepalese cricketer
- Santosh Lamichhane, Nepalese writer
- Sarita Lamichhane (b. 1975), Nepalese actress
- Shankar Lamichhane, Nepalese writer
- Sajan Lamichhane (born 23 August 2001) Nepali cricket photographer and photojournalist
- Sudan Gurung (Lamichhane), Home Minister of Nepal
