= Mainali =

Mainali मैनाली
- Language: Nepali, Doteli, Kumaoni

Origin
- Language: Khas language
- Origin: Khasa kingdom

Other names
- Derivative: Kumain Mainali
- See also: Sitaula, Bhatta, Joshi, Panta, Upreti, Gyawali

Mainali (मैनाली) is a surname found within the Hindu community of Kumaoni and Nepali Brahman and Chhetri, primarily living in the Kumaon and Garhwal regions of Uttarakhand state of India and all over Nepal. Mainali are Joshi and claim their ancestry to the Vedic Sage Upamanyu.

They are believed to have Immigrated all the way from Dwarahat Kumaon to Kanpur, located in the current Kavrepalanchok District of present day Nepal.

The Known History of Mainali in Nepal dates back to the era of King Narendra Malla of Kathmandu Valley reigning from 1538 to 1560. Narendra Malla is said to have called Mainali's from Kumaon ( Now India) as the royal priest of temples in Basantapur Durbar ( Now Hanuman Dhoka Durbar Square).

Kul devi of Mainali is said to be Goddess Kalika. The temples in Kanpur, Kavrepalanchowk - the origin place of Mainali's in Nepal has 2 famous and ancient temples of Goddess Kalika which is over 600 years old and said to have divine powers. The temples are said to be sacred and is said to perspire and sweat in times of natural disaster, or during the times of danger to the Mainali clan.

== Notable people with the surname Mainali ==
- Guru Prasad Mainali, Nepalese short story writer
- Chandra Prakash Mainali, Nepalese politician
- Radha Krishna Mainali, Nepalese politician
- Padma Kumar Mainali, Joint Secretary, MOUD, Nepal
