= Schranz =

Schranz is a German surname. Notable people with the surname include:

- Andreas Schranz (born 1979), Austrian football goalkeeper, played for various Austrian clubs and the Austria national team
- Ivan Schranz (born 1993), Slovak football player, plays for Slavia Prague and the Slovakia national team
- Karl Schranz (born 1938), Austrian alpine skier
- Károly Schranz (born 1952), Hungarian violinist
- Wolfgang Schranz (born 1976), Austrian tennis player
