= Sapkota =

- Language: Nepali

Other names
- Variant forms: Brahmin, Jaisi, Chhetri
- Derived: Derived from the Sanskrit word Sakha meaning "friend" or "honorable".

Sapkota (Nepali: सापकोटा) is a surname mainly found among people in Nepal from the Khas Hill Brahmin (Bahun) and Chhetri communities. People with this surname have traditionally worked in various fields like farming, education, and government roles. The name is widely recognized in Nepal and India and among Nepali diaspora.

== Notable people ==
- Agni Prasad Sapkota (born 1958), Nepalese politician
- Arjun Sapkota (born 1999), Nepalese folk singer, song-writer, and musician
- Bhakta Bahadur Sapkota (born 1947), Nepalese long-distance runner
- Bidur Prasad Sapkota (1965 or 1966 – 2025), Nepalese politician
- Janak Sapkota (born 1987), Nepalese haiku poet
- Mahananda Sapkota (1896–1977), Nepalese social worker, etymologist, linguist, and poet
