= Tabone =

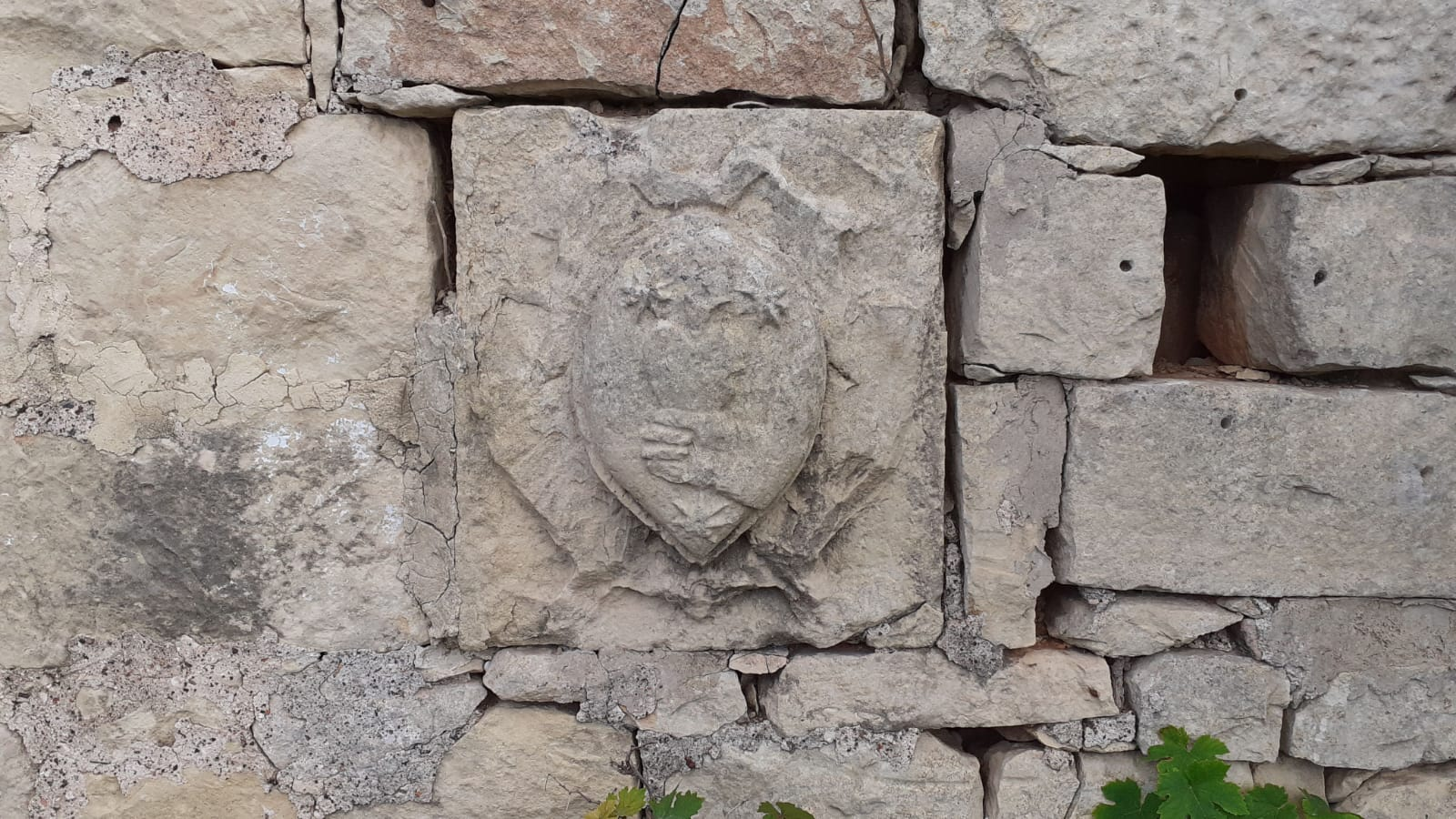
The Tabone coat of arms, originally located on a tower built by Clemente Tabone in 1603

Tabone is a Maltese surname. Notable people with the surname include:

- Anton Tabone (born 1937), Maltese politician
- Ċensu Tabone (1913–2012), Maltese politician, fourth President of Malta
- Clemente Tabone (c. 1575–1665), Maltese landowner and militia member
- Emiliano Tabone (born 1991), Argentine footballer
- John Tabone (born 1980), Maltese swimmer
- John Tabone (sailor) (born 1958), Maltese sailor
- Luke Tabone (born 1997), Maltese footballer
- Neil Tabone (born 1997), Maltese footballer
- Paul Ettore Tabone (born 1988), Australian lyric tenor and actor
