= Siwakoti =

Nepalese surname

Siwakoti (Nepali: शिवाकोटी) also spelled as Shiwakoti, Sibakoti, Shibakoti or Shivakoti, Shivakoty, Shivakotee, is a surname used by certain subgroup from khas community belonging to Kumain Brahmin caste, and natives of Nepal India and Bhutan. Shivakotee is a sub caste referred to as thar(Surname) in the Nepalese community. Shiwakoti belongs to Bharadwaj gotra Ancestors of Shivakotee are from kumoun regions in uttarkhand that is why they are also called Kumai or people from Shivakotee also used Kumai as their surname. Nagpanchami is the biggest event for the people belonging from this community at this day they conduct kulpuja there kuldevta is kalikanag. Mostly people from this community speak Nepali nowadays but there ancestral language is Kumouni language.

== Notable people ==
- Dr. Yuba Raj Siwakoti, Professor, Central Washington University, USA.
- Chintamani Siwakoti, Deputy Governor of Nepal Rastra Bank
- Barsha Siwakoti, Nepali Film Actress
- Dr. Yam Siwakoti, A. Professor, University of Technology Sydney.
- Hari Siwakoti - Nepali Film Actor/Director(First Nepali film made in USA)
