= Lamsal =

Lamsal is a Nepalese surname. Notable people with the surname include:

- Arunima Lamsal (contemporary), Nepalese actress
- Laxman Lamsal (fl. 2018–present), Nepalese politician
- Naba Raj Lamsal (born 1969), Nepalese poet, journalist, and author
- Suresh Lamsal (born 1988), Chartered Accountant, and author
