= Maciej Żurowski =

Polish French literary historian and translator

- Born: 17 September 1915; Płock
- Died: 8 May 2003 (aged 87); Warsaw

Maciej Żurowski (17 September 1915 in Płock – 8 May 2003 in Warsaw) was a Polish historian of French literature, translator, Romanist. He was a professor of University of Warsaw, co-editor of Przegląd humanistyczny (since 1957).

== Works ==
Żurowski was an author of literature and researches about French literature, especially of 18th-20th century. He was also an author of Arcydzieła francuskiego średniowiecza (anthology; 1968), Symbolizm francuski (1988), O literaturze europejskiej z perspektywy komparatysty: Między renesansem a awangardą. He translated French and American literature, including works of Marcel Proust and Comte de Lautréamont.
