= Vinod Kumar Baranwal =

Indian Judge

High Court of Allahabad
- In office 17 April 2019 – 25 February 2020

Chief Judicial Magistrate Bareilly
- In office 16 April 2012 – 15 April 2013
- Succeeded by: High Court of Allahabad

Personal details
- Born: 9 July 1969 (age 57) Uttar Pradesh, India
- Education: University of Lucknow

Vinod Kumar Baranwal (born 9 July 1969) is a judge of Allahabad. Currently, he is posted in the Special MP/MLA court of Rai Bareli. His father's name was Ram Kailash Baranwal. He completed his B.A L.L.B from University of Allahabad. He has worked as the Chief Judicial Magistrate of Bareilly from 16 April 2012 to 15 April 2013.
