= Farshchian (surname) =

Farshchian is a surname. Notable people with the surname include:

- Alimorad Farshchian (born 1962), American medical doctor
- Mahmoud Farshchian (1930-2025), Iranian painter
