= Banskota =

Also spelled as Baskota (Devanagari : बाँस्कोटा) is a surname of Upadhyay Brahmins from Nepal. Throughout their history in Nepal, they have mostly held vocations as pandit, teachers, purohits, and government officers. Banskotas' gotra is Koudinya.

Banskotas have their origin in Kannauj, India. As written in the comprehensive Banskota Bhansawali book, during the Muslim Invasion of India in the 13th century, Vedic Bhatt Brahmins escaped their home, Kanya Kubja, to escape the destructive Muslim forces. It is recorded in Indian history, as well as the Banskota Bhanswali book that the invaders wanted to destroy the Hindu Vedic culture and ways. In order to preserve the Vedic Hindu culture from the wrath of the invaders, the Bhatt Brahmins sought refuge in the hills of the Himalayas. During this time, many Brahmins migrated from the Muslim invaded areas seeking safety. The Bhatt Brahmins first settled in the part that is now western Nepal. One of the descendants of the Bhatt was relocated to a place called Banskot of modern-day Dailekh by a king to fulfill his Brahmin duties, which is where he gained the surname Banskota. Another descendant was given the surname acharya— hence is the reason Banskotas' and Acharyas' have the same gotra and cannot marry each other. Similarly Neupane surname was given to one of the descendants.

In the present day, most Banskota communities in Nepal continue to follow family traditions. Additionally, a Banskota bandhu jamghat continues taking place, generally in Gaurighat, Kathmandu at Sardar Som Prasad Banskota Guthi's premises.

Notable people with name Banskota or its variations include:

- Sambhujeet Baskota, Nepali music composer, songwriter, and singer
- Gokul Prasad Baskota, Nepali politician
- Prithu Baskota, Nepali cricketer
- Dipak Prakash Baskota, Nepalese politician
- Kali Prasad Baskota, Nepali music composer, songwriter, and singer
- Balram Baskota, Nepali politician

== See also ==
- Khas people
- Khas Kingdom
- Rajput
