= Dhungel =

Dhungel (Nepali: ढुङ्गेल) is a Nepali surname. “Dhungel” a traditional Khas Brahmin (Bahun) lineage in Nepal, belonging to the Agasti (Purbiya) gotra.

Notable people with the surname Dhungel include:

- Rameshwor Prasad Dhungel, Nepalese politician and Member of Legislative Assembly of Nepal
- Ram Hari Dhungel, Nepalese politician
- Nagendra Prasad Dhungel, Nepalese Politician and former Member of Nepali Congress Party. One of the revolutionary leaders, who worked alongside BP Koirala against the then “Panchayat Regime” of Nepal.
