= Sarita Lamichhane =

Nepalese actress

- सरिता लामिछाने
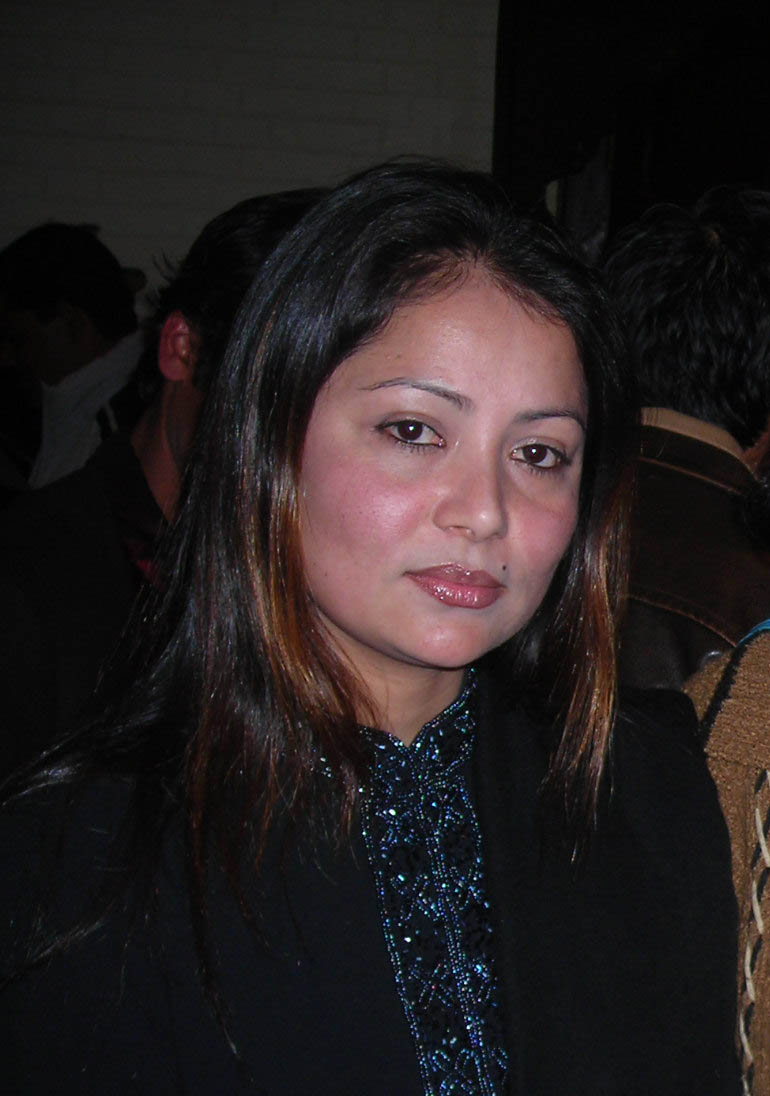
- Sarita Lamichhane in a program in Kathmandu in 2007.
- Born: November 25, 1975 (age 50); Kathmandu, Nepal
- Education: B. Ed. (Padma Kanya Campus)
- Alma mater: Tribhuvan University
- Occupations: Actress, Model
- Known for: Mukti (Tele Serial)
- Spouse: Rishi Lamichhane
- Children: Samriddee Lamichane (Daughter)

Sarita Lamichhane (Nepali: सरिता लामिछाने, born November 25, 1975) is a Nepalese actress who is known for her work in television series Mukti.

== Early life ==
Sarita is a native of Kathmandu. She was born on November 25, 1975 in a Jhapa family to Raghubir Pandey and Mira Devi Pandey. Lamichhane had attended Nepal Government School in 1989, following by Higher Secondary Education of Board (H.S.E.B) for Intermediate Education in 1992 and Tribhuvan University, earning a Bachelors of Education (B. Ed.) in 1994.

== Career ==
Sarita debuted on Mukti, released on Nepal Television (NTV). She performed the lead role in the T.V. Serial Chetanako Diyo ( NTV),Aachanak (NTV), Dui Din Ko Zindagani (NTV), Gahana (NTV), Janaki ( NTV), Sita (NTV), ChahanaManko (Kanitpur Television), Parichaya (home production- Producer, NTV with highest TRP).

In addition to acting in films, Sarita was a judge for Mrs. Nepal international 2015, Mr /Mrs. Rajdhani 2015, Miss Youth Nepal 2015, INAS Award 2017, B.S., National film award 2015, INAS award 2015, FAAN AWARD 2016, NEFTA Award 2017.

She participated in several stage shows and engaged in philanthropic activities. In 2014, she was elected as the General Secretary at Film Artistes Association of Nepal [FAAN].

== Personal life ==
She is married to Mr. Rishi Lamichhane, with whom she has one daughter.
