= Bonello =

Bonello is a surname. Notable people with the surname include:

- Agostino Bonello (born 1949), Maltese production designer, art director and film producer
- Bernice Bonello, Maltese politician
- Bertrand Bonello (born 1968), French film director, screenwriter, producer and composer
- Gareth Bonello (born 1981), Welsh singer-songwriter better known as The Gentle Good
- Giovanni Bonello (born 1936), Maltese judge
- Henry Bonello (born 1988), Maltese footballer
- Joe Bonello (born 1961), Maltese Roman Catholic bishop
- John Bonello (footballer) (born 1958), Maltese footballer
- John Bonello (referee), Canadian professional wrestler and referee
- Justin Bonello (born 1971), South African chef, television personality and producer
- Mario Bonello (born 1974), Maltese sprinter
- Mathieu Bonello (born 1982), French rugby union player
- Michael C. Bonello, Maltese banker
- Michelle Bonello (born 1985), Canadian women's ice hockey player
