= La Bajada, Catamarca =

Coordinates: 28.3663°S 65.6210°W

La Bajada
- Municipality and village
- Interactive map of La Bajada
- Country: Argentina
- Province: Catamarca Province
- Department: Paclín
- Time zone: UTC−3 (ART)

La Bajada is a village and municipality within the Paclín Department of Catamarca Province in northwestern Argentina.
