= Clint Bajada =

Maltese television and radio personality

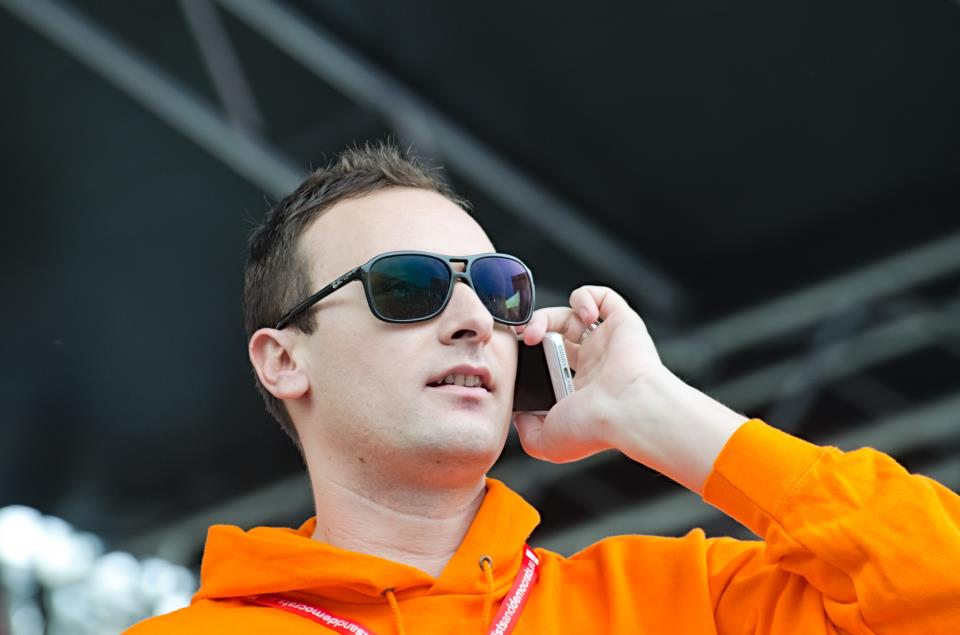
- Born: Malta
- Occupation: Head of ONE Radio
- Predecessor: Ray Azzopardi
- Website: Station website Official facebook Clint on ONE Facebook

Clint Bajada is a television and radio personality. He hosted with success a variety of local shows including 'Coyotic', 'clint@nine', 'HappyDays', and 'STR82dPOINT'. He is also known for his Saturday morning Radio show which during the Malta Broadcasting Authority was classified as the most popular radio show in Malta in various audience surveys.

Bajada started his career as a radio presenter with Super ONE Radio at the age of 15. At young age of just 16 he appeared in a local Sunday Television show called ‘Kulhadd fil-Millenju’ together with presenters Claire Fabri & Ray Azzopardi. During his career he was involved in different TV programs including talk shows, news, current affairs and entertainment.

During 2007, Bajada hosted Coyotic. This programme was a dancing competition between 30 girls. They were judged for their dancing abilities, personality and looks.

As from year 2010 to-date, Clint hosted the popular Saturday mid-morning show 'Clint on ONE'. It is considered as the top music TV-Radio show currently followed on local stations. Within 120 minutes, Bajada captures local celebrity interviews, live acoustic acts, visiting guest DJs, new music albums & videos, Interactive SMS, E-mail and Facebook and god knows what we will think of for the future…

Clint on ONE is aired simultaneously on Radio & TV from a state-of-the-art studio in MTV style, every Saturday from 11hrs till 13hrs.

In September 2013, Clint Bajada has been appointed head of ONE Radio, taking over from Ray Azzopardi, who held the position for 22 years.

== Shows presented ==
TV shows

- 2026 to date: Ċempel u Irbaħ – TV Game show
- 2010 to 2016: Clint on ONE – Radio & TV Music show
- 2013: Stream – Youth Discussion programme/Pre General Election
- 2007: Coyotic – Dancing competition show
- 2006: Clint@Nine – Reality & Entertainment show
- 2005/2006: Happy days – Entertainment & Magazine show
- 2004/2006: STR82DPOINT - Youth Discussion Programme
- 2003-2007: Minn Nicca 'l Barra - Feast programs
- 2003: Ghal Kull Hadd - Sunday Afternoon Entertainment show
- 2003: Summer Break - Sunday Afternoon Entertainment show
- 2002: Chiara & Friends- Sunday Morning Entertainment show
- 2001: Wotz on - Youth programme
- 2000: Kullhadd fil-Millennju - Sunday Afternoon show

== Other contributions ==
Journalist & article contributor

- 2003: Team – Investigative journalism
- 2003: "Qribna" - Political journalism

Newspaper contributor 2008: it-Torca – Weekly article contributor

Special Appearances

- October 2016: Presenter of Għanja tal-Poplu 40th edition celebration, during Notte Bianca and live on National Television - Capital City, Valletta.
- July 2016: Judge for L-Għanja tal-Poplu 2016.
- June 2016: MC/Warm-up Host for Steve Aoke at Isle of MTV Malta
- January - December 2016: Board member as part of a working committee for the 7th World Summit of Arts and Culture - Valletta 2016 - IFACCA & Arts Council Malta.
- December 2015: DJ & MC, New Year's Eve National Celebrations - Capital City, Valletta.
- July 2015: MC/Warm-up Host for Martin Garrix at Isle of MTV Malta
- December 2014: DJ & MC, New Year's Eve National Celebrations - Capital City, Valletta.
- June 2014: MC/Warm-up Host for Enrique Iglesias at Isle of MTV Malta
- April 2014: Presenter, 10th Anniversary Celebrations of EU accession, Valletta
- March 2014: Presenter, Ghanja tal-Poplu Song Festival
- December 2013: DJ & MC, New Year's Eve National Celebrations - Capital City, Valletta.
- December 2013: Co-Producer & Live voice over intros, ONE Tribute
- August 2013: Presenter, Johnny Logan Live in Concert
- June 2013: MC/Warm-up Host for Rudimental and Jessie J at Isle of MTV Malta
- Jan-March 2013: Entertainment coordinator and main Presenter for all Labour Party (PL) Mass Meetings. PL won the national election by over 35,000 votes on the Nationalist Party. PL won a massive 55% of the votes
- December 2012: Co-Producer, ONE Tribute - ONE Productions Limited
- September 2012: Presenter, ONE TV Launch of New Autumn Schedule
- September 2012: Production/Coordination, jingles/sweepers of KISS on DAB+
- August 2012: Presenter, Smokie Live in Concert
- December 2011: Co-Producer, ONE Tribute
- October 2007: Judge for the Malta Music Awards 2007
- December 2006: Produced and presented 12 days build up campaign for the Malta Labour Party fund raising marathon
- December 2006: Chairman of the Jury Panel of the Malta International TV Song Festival
- September 2006: Producer and presenter of ONE Productions Ltd launch for October/December 2006 schedule of ONE TV and Super ONE Radio. An important launch which leads to a change in the stations' brand image and the first day of digital transmissions
- August 2006: Producer & Presenter of the 15th anniversary celebration of Super ONE Radio
