= Brincat =

Brincat is a surname. Notable people with the surname include:

- Ċettina Darmenia Brincat (1931–2023), Maltese businesswoman and politician
- Concetta Brincat (1870–1940), Maltese-language novelist
- Joe Brincat (footballer) (born 1970), Maltese footballer
- Lauren Brincat (born 1980), Australian performance and installation artist
- Paul Brincat (died 1 June 2025), Australian audio engineer
