= Chapagain =

- Language: Nepali language, Doteli language

Origin
- Origin: Khasa Kingdom
- Meaning: People from Chapagaun (Chapa village)

Other names
- Variant forms: Chapai, Chapain, Chapagai

Chapagain (Nepali: चापागाईं) or Chapai is a surname found in Nepal. It is a toponymic family name from Chapagaun village in Chamunda Bindrasaini municipality of Dailekh district in Karnali Province. It belongs to Khas Bahun and Chhetri people of Nepal.

== Notable people ==
Notable people with the surname includes

- Bidhya Chapagain, Nepali journalist
- Buddhisagar (Buddhi Ram Chapain), Nepali writer
- Dharma Sila Chapagain, Nepali politician
- Suraj Chapagain, Nepali actor
- Sujan Chapagain, Nepali singer
