= Dhungana =

Dhungana (Devanagari ढुङ्गाना) is a Nepali surname belonging to Bahun caste. It originated from a village named Dhungani in Western Nepal. Notable people with surname Dhungana include:

- Bhuwan Dhungana, Nepalese writer and poet
- Daman Nath Dhungana, former chief of House of Representative of Nepal
- Neeta Dhungana, Nepalese actress
- Ramit Dhungana, Nepalese actor
