= Schembri =

Schembri (/ˈʃkɛmbri/ ; [shkem-bree]) is an Italian/Maltese surname. Notable people with the surname include:

- Andrew tad-Dawl Schembri (born 1993), Maltese artist and musician
- André Schembri (born 1986), Maltese footballer
- Antonio Schembri (ornithologist) (1813–1872), Maltese ornithologist
- Carmelo Schembri, Maltese judge
- Deborah Schembri (born 1976), Maltese politician and attorney
- Eric Schembri (born 1955), Maltese footballer
- Fabrizio Schembri (born 1981), Italian athlete
- Justin Schembri, Maltese politician
- Karl Schembri (born 1978), Maltese writer and journalist
- Keith Schembri (born 1975), Maltese politician
- Nino Schembri (born 1974), Brazilian mixed martial artist
- Pippo Schembri (1911–1981), Maltese water polo player
- Salvinu Schembri (1923–2008), Maltese footballer
- Silvio Schembri (born 1985), Maltese politician and academic

== See also ==
- Lorraine Schembri Orland (born 1959), Maltese judge at the European Court of Human Rights
