= Kazimierz Żurowski =

Polish archaeologist

Kazimierz Żurowski (12 August 1909 in Zagórz – 19 March 1987 in Gniezno) was a Polish archaeologist. He was a professor at Nicolaus Copernicus University in Toruń, and researcher of a Bronze Age and early Middle Ages. Author of book Gniezno, pierwsza stolica Polski (Polish for Gniezno, the first capital of Poland).
