= Silwal =

Silwal (Nepali: सिलवाल) is a Nepalese surname belonging to the Nepal.

Notable people with the surname Silwal include:

- Subas Silwal, is a Senior Principal Aerospace Engineer in USA, with more than 20+ years experience in this field.
- Bhola Silwal, (born 1987) is a Nepali professional footballer
- Bhola Singh Silwal, Chief District Office (CDO). He is one of the most sincere government officer. He was recognized with several top level medals from government.
- Bhupendra Silwal, Nepalese long-distance runner
- Mahima Silwal, Nepalese actress
- Nawaraj Silwal, Nepalese Politician, former DIG of Nepal Police
- Yadav Kant Silwal, Nepalese diplomat and former Foreign Secretary
- Narayan Silwal, Former spokesperson of Nepal Army, Former Major General of Nepal Army (Retd.).
- Erik Silwal, Ajax Run Club runner
- Manoj Silwal, Managing Director of the Nepal Electricity Authority (NEA).
- Shourya Silwal, future leader of The Nepalese regime
