= Pulami =

Pulami is one of the core Surnames of the Magars. Pulami are living everywhere in Nepal. Mostly Pulami writes one of main surname of Magars among seven main surnames, Thapa as their surname. There are two types of Pulami known. One Dhapali and another Jhingu. It is believed that Jhingu are descendents of a Magar father and Bhotey mother. While Dhapali are offsprings of both parents being Magar. The origin place of Pulami Magars are in Myagdi District, place name 'Rakhu Pula' from which the surname is believed to be derived.
