= Kokradi =

Kokradi Kokrady
- village
- Location in Karnataka, India Kokradi (India)
- Coordinates: 13°01′20″N 075°08′18″E
- Country: India
- State: Karnataka
- District: Dakshina Kannada
- Taluka: Beltangadi
- Gram panchayat: Andinje

Government
  - Body: Village panchayat

Population (2011)
  - Total: 1,360

Languages
  - Official: Kannada
- Time zone: UTC+5:30 (IST)
- PIN: 574242
- ISO 3166 code: IN-KA
- Vehicle registration: KA
- Website: karnataka.gov.in

Kokradi (Kokrady) is an agricultural village in Dakshina Kannada (South Canara district) of Karnataka State in India. Village population is predominantly engaged in arecanut farming. Administratively, it is under Andinje gram panchayat, Belthangadi Taluk, Dakshina Kannada. Kokradi is also used as a surname among the Billava, Chitrapur, Saraswat, and Brahmins from the village. Billava community constitutes the majority of the village population .

== Demographics ==
The Indian Census of 2001 showed 235 households in Kokradi with a total population of 1,167. In the 2011 census, the village recorded an increase of 153 persons or 1.4% a year. I

It has a Tulu speaking majority Hindu population and some Kannada and Konkani speakers(both Hindu and Catholic).

== See also ==
- Mangalore
- Saraswats
- Tulu
