= Sitaula (surname) =

Sitaula, or Sitoula, (Nepali: सिटाैला) is a Brahmin surname of Nepal. This surname was given to Shankar Padhya Bhardwaj's sons because they came from sitouli gaon of India. People bearing this surname are originally from sitouli.

These Brahmins are said to have come from rohilkhand, uttar pradesh to uttarakhand according to the writings of Pandit ganga dutt upreti in his book. So is also mentioned in the books written by Badri dutt pandey's book and Rahul Sankirtyayan(Kedarnath pandey)'s book .The Brahmin family has Misra aspad while they follow Madhyandina sakha of shukla yajurveda.These follow Katyayana sutra .These are dakshin sikhayi .Pad is dakshin pad.

As far as family worship(Kul puja) is concerned.The group of Brahmin worship Shiva and devi in the form of Jaddur mahadev and Bhagirathi ganga(Form of devi worshipped may vary).This group of Brahmin follow Shiva tradition of Hinduism while also worshiping shiva as their patron god.

As far as the entry of the group is concerned in Nepal.Shankar Padhyaya Sitaula(Aspad :Misra, Gotra;Bharadvāja) came to Nepal during the time of "Prithvi Narayan Shah" and is said to have been given the kush birta of Chuhandada, Nuhakot(Now Nuwakot) while evidenced, Tamra patra of which No longer exist.This group has also been said to be given birta in Shikhar besi (Nuwakot).

These Brahmin traditionally did not plow land while they were involved in government in Nepal.These Brahmin are also said to have been part of "Militia of the Chand kings of Kumaon."

Although they are part of khas-arya classification in Nepal they arenot of Khas origin.

Notable people with the name include:

- Bharat Sitaula, Nepali pop singer and producer
- Lila Devi Sitaula, Nepali politician of the People's Socialist Party
- Krishna Prasad Sitaula, Nepali politician of the Nepali Congress
- Priti Sitoula, winner of the Miss Nepal 2003 pageant
