= Regmi =

- Language: Nepali, Garhwali, Kumaoni, Jumli

Origin
- Language: Nepali language
- Origin: Khasa kingdom
- Meaning: Toponym of Regma

Regmi is a surname of the Khas Brahmin of South Asia, particularly found in Nepal, also found in Uttarkhand.

== Origin ==
According to oral history passed down to the Regmi family through generations, it is believed that the surname originated in the far-western village of Regam, Bajhang, Nepal. It is believed that a king of Bajhang gave the village of Regam, to a Joshi who are Brahmin famous for their work in astrology and then their descendants were called as Regmi.

Also according to these users on forebears.io.

The Regmi surname belongs to the Hill Brahmins, Indo-Aryan Pahari people. They were medicine practitioner and once helped a king to cure his daughter. They were called Regmi, because they originated from the Regma village, western Nepal.

— prajwalregmi

== Notable people ==
Notable people with the regmi surname include:

- Basanta Regmi, Nepali cricketer
- Dilli Raman Regmi, Nepali Congress politician and historian
- Khil Raj Regmi, former Nepali Acting Prime Minister and Chief Justice
- Mahesh Chandra Regmi, Nepali historian^{[1]}
- Sarala Regmi, Nepali politician
- Shiva Regmi, Nepali film director, producer and writer
