= Misri Gul =

Bagram detainee

- Born: 1986 (age 39–40); Khost
- Detained at: Bagram
- Charge: weapons possession
- Occupation: farmer

Misri Gul (born 1986) is a citizen of Afghanistan held in extrajudicial detention in the United States's Bagram Theater internment facility, in Afghanistan. Misri Gul, his father, and two of his brothers were the first captives to face charges, and trial, at Bagram, under the Afghan justice system. The four men are charged with bomb making and weapons possession.

Heidi Vogt, reporting for the Associated Press wrote that Misri Gul was captured in October 2009, in Khost Province. One brother, Ghazni was apprehended when he visited Misri Gul, at the prison, in March 2010. His father Bismullah and a third brother Rahmi, were taken into custody when American forces raided their home in May 2010.

Vogt reported that the men were being charged with weapons possession. She reported that, although translators from the Dari language to English were provided for foreign observers, initially, no translator had been provided to translate the court's proceedings into the Pashtu language the captives spoke. She reported that the men's attorney had objected that they had only been given a few days to meet their clients and prepare their cases.

The court adjourned in order to provide more time for the attorneys to meet with the suspects, and to find a Dari-Pashtun translator.

On January 15, 2010, the Department of Defense complied with a court order and published a list of the names of 645 Captives held in the Bagram Theater Internment Facility. But that list was drafted on September 22, 2009—prior to capture of Misri Gul and his family members.
