= Kattel =

Kattel (Nepali: कट्टेल) is a surname belonging to the people of either Upadhya Brahmins Bahun caste from Nepal. The Brahmins write Kattel.

Notable people with the surname Kattel include:

- Rishi Kattel, Nepali politician
- Sitaram Kattel, Nepalese actor

== In Estonia ==
- Rainer Kattel, Estonian academic and science administrator

== Fictional Usage ==
- Basudev Kattel, Main protagonist from novel Kattel Sarko Chotpatak (translation: Kattel Sir's Injuries)
