= De Stenen Tafel =

Former Michelin-starred Dutch restaurant

Coordinates: 52°6′54.38″N 6°31′16.61″E

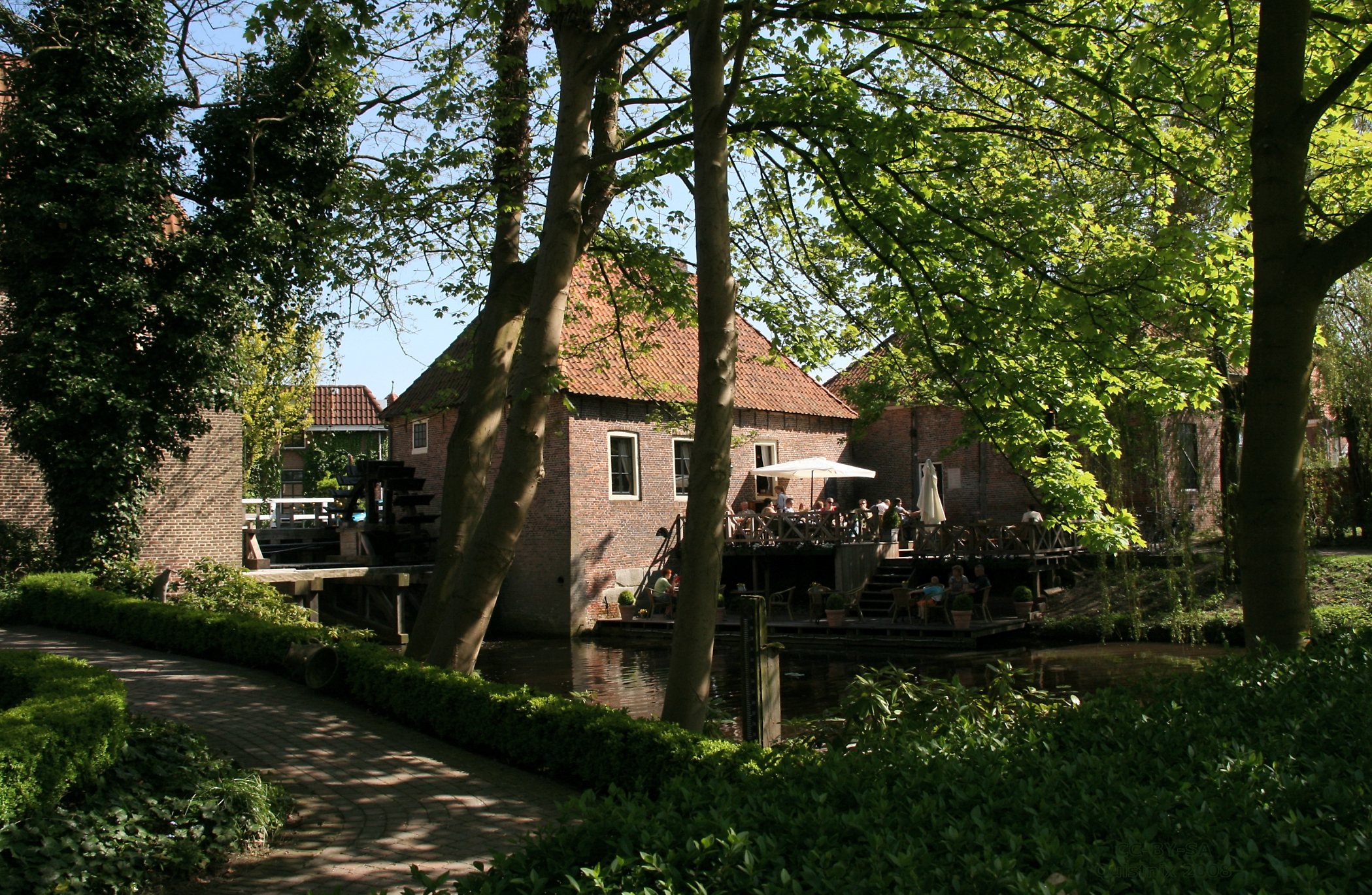
- Interactive map of De Stenen Tafel

Restaurant information
- Established: 1971
- Head chef: Raymond Prinsen
- Food type: French
- Rating: Michelin Guide
- Location: Het Eiland 1, Borculo, 7271 BK, Netherlands
- Website: Official website

De Stenen Tafel is a restaurant in Borculo, in the Netherlands. It is a fine dining restaurant that was awarded one Michelin star in 1999 and retained that rating until 2011.

French restaurant guide Gault Millau did not mention the restaurant or its sister bistro De Olliemölle.

The head chef of De Stenen Tafel is Raymond Prinsen, who took over in 1994.

Prinsen closed the restaurant in April 2011, due to lack of motivation. He went on with his Bib Gourmand bistro De Olliemölle and started developing other plans, like a cookery school. Prinsen did not enjoy his restaurant-free period and announced the return of the restaurant in April 2012. Although with a different concept, just open two days a week and 20 couverts, he has promised to try to get his star back. The restaurant, nicknamed "De Stenen Tafel 2.0", reopened on 14 September 2012.

Raymond Prinsen and his wife Gea Meppelink bought the watermill in 2007. The local municipality Berkelland was in financial difficulties and the sale solved a bit of their problems. For Prinsen and Meppelink, this means that they not only own the restaurant, but also the building in which they have heavily invested.

In 2009, Gault Millau awarded the restaurant the Wine Award for the quality of its wine list.

== See also ==
- List of Michelin starred restaurants in the Netherlands
