= Bogati (surname) =

Bogati (Nepali: बोगटी) is a surname found in Nepal. They belong to the highest of the Chhetri community in Nepal. Mostly scattered around western Nepal I.e. Doti, Achham and Darchula. They believe that their ancestors are from gadwal they call themselves as "Rajbar". Some believe Gorkha to be their home land. Several families of whom came with the conquest of Kathmandu reside in the valley mainly in Lalitpur. Notable people with the surname include:

- Post Bahadur Bogati, (1953–2014) Nepalese politician
- Sabitri Bogati, Nepalese politician
- Tika Bogati, Nepalese athlete
- Ram Keshar Bogati, Nepalese Film Association
