= Ghaznavi (surname) =

Ghaznawi is a toponymic surname (nisba) meaning from Ghazni (formerly Ghazna), a city in central Afghanistan. Notable people with the surname include:

- Abdul Halim Ghaznavi (1876-1953), politician in British India
- Abdul Karim Ghaznavi (1872–1939), politician in British India
- Abdullah Ghaznavi (1811–1881), Afghan-Indian Islamic scholar
- Ghulam Mohi-ud-Din Ghaznavi (1902-1975), Pakistani Sufi
- Hassan Ghaznavi, 12th-century Persian poet
- Ismail of Ghazni, emir of Ghazni
- Jamal al-Din al-Ghaznawi, Sunni Muslim scholar
- Kaif Ghaznavi, Pakistani actress
- Khatir Ghaznavi (1925–2008), Pakistani writer
- Mahmud of Ghazni (971–1030), founder of the Ghaznavid dynasty
- Mawdud of Ghazni (died 1050), Ghaznavid dynasty ruler
- Muhammad of Ghazni (died 1041), Ghaznavid dynasty ruler
- Rafiq Ghaznavi (1907–1974), musician in Indian films
- Shatir Ghaznavi (1905–1971), writer for Indian films
