= Bista =

Bista Bisht
- Language: Nepali

Origin
- Derivation: Bishista (Distinguished)
- Meaning: Baron or landholder

Other names
- Variant forms: Bishta, Bishta, Bisht
- Derivative: Bishta Kshatri/Chhetri
- See also: Thapa, Basnet, Kunwar, Khadka, Karki

Bista (Nepali: बिष्ट, IPA: [bisʈʌ]) is a surname of the Khas People of Nepal and North India, particularly associated with the Chettri/Khas Kshatriya community in regions such as Uttarakhand and Himachal Pradesh. They are majorly Hindu but some communities also practice Khas Shamanism and worship the Masto Deity.

They speak the Nepali language as their mother tongue. In India, Bista/Bistas are spelled as Bisht/Bishts or Bist/Bists and are titled as Khas Rajputs. They are mostly found in Indian state of Uttarakhand. Bista is also a surname belonging to the Brahmins of the Kumain Bahun subcaste.

== Naming and Status ==
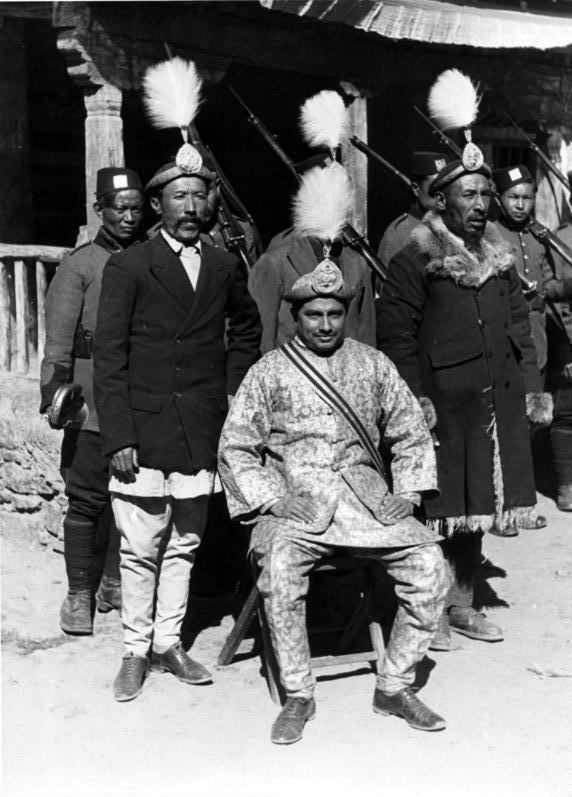
Surrounded by Tibetan guards, Major Hiranya Bista (seated), a Pahari government officer of Chhetri caste

Bista is literally translated as Baron or landholder. For example; Chauhan in Eastern Nepal were referred as Bista in an explanation of assault of a Chauhan man by a Dalit man where governmental orders of capital punishment was given to the Dalit man on Poush Badi 12, 1882 V.S. (1826 A.D.) on the grounds of assaulting a high caste citizen. The excerpts from the royal orders to Bichari (Judge) Shivanidhi Padhya and Bichari (Judge) Parath Khadka on Poush Badi 12, 1882 V.S.:

Bhote Kami, a resident of Dorpagaun village in Majhuwa, had a quarrel with Daulat Chuhan of the same village. They started abusing each other on the road. Sarba Budhathoki then asked Bhote Kami why, being a Kami, he was abusing a Bista in that manner. At this, Bhote Kami took out his Khukuri and his at Sarba Budathoki, chopping off half of his ear and wounding his cheek. For this crime, Bhote Kami shall have his right arm amputated. His share of the ancestral property shall be confiscated, after apportioning the shares of his brothers and sons.

— Excerpts from the royal orders to Bichari Shivanidhi Padhya and Bichari Parath Khadka on Poush Badi 12, 1882 V.S.

== Notable people with surname Bista ==
- Adityanath Yogi, Indian politician and Chief Minister of Uttar Pradesh.
- Anjan Bista, Nepalese footballer
- Deepak Bista, taekwondo gold medalist
- Dor Bahadur Bista, Nepalese anthropologist
- Gokarna Bista, Nepalese politician
- Kirti Nidhi Bista, former PM of Nepal
- Om Bikram Bista, Nepali pop singer
- Raju Bista, member of Indian parliament from Darjeeling.
- Ranjan Bista, Nepalese footballer

== Notable people with title Bista ==
- Jigme Dorje Palbar Bista, Former Titular King of Mustang
