= Rokaya =

Nepalese Magar and Kshatri family name

- Language: Nepali

Origin
- Languages: Khas language, Magar languages
- Origin: Khas kshetri & Magar
- Meaning: Brave and honest

Other names
- Variant forms: Rokka, Rokaha, Roka, Rokaya
- Derivatives: Rokaya (in Kshatri), Roka, Rokaha, Rokka (in Magar)
- See also: Mahat, Karki, Katwal, Rayamajhi,

Rokaya (Nepali: रोकाया), Roka (Nepali: रोका), Rokka (Nepali: रोक्का or Rokaha (Nepali: रोकाहा) is a surname of the Magar and Khas communities. Its variants of Roka and Rokaya can be found among the Chhetri Khas group. Notable people with the surname Roka/Rokaya include:

- Jun Kumari Roka (Oli), Nepalese politician
- Keshar Man Rokka, Nepalese politician
- Manoj RC, Nepalese film actor
