= Kanwar =

Kanwar may refer to:

== People ==
=== Surname ===
- Amar Kanwar (born 1964), Indian artist
- Anita Kanwar, Indian actor
- Indira Kanwar (c. 1696 – 1793), Mughal empress
- Narendra Kanwar, Indian politician
- Raj Kanwar (c. 1961 – 2012), Indian film director
- Ranbir Singh Kanwar (1930–2005), Indian agronomist
- Roop Kanwar (c. 1969 – 1987), Indian woman notable for committing sati
- Sarul Kanwar (born 1987), Indian cricketer

=== Given name ===
- Kanwar Bahadur Singh (1910–2007), a senior officer in the Indian Army
- Kanwar Dhillon, Indian actor
- Kanwar Pal Gujjar, Indian politician
- Kanwar Pal Singh Gill, Indian police officer
- Kanwar Sen, Indian civil engineer, planner of the Indira Gandhi Canal in Rajasthan
- Kanwar Singh Tanwar, Indian politician
- Kanwarpal Tathgur, Indian-Canadian cricketer

== Other uses ==
- Kanwar (tribe), a community found in the Indian states of Chhattisgarh, Jharkhand and Odisha
- Kunwar family (or Kanwar family), a noble Chhetri family in the Gorkha Kingdom and the Kingdom of Nepal
- Kanwar Sanctuary, Kullu district, Himachal Pradesh, India
- Kanwar Yatra, a Hindu religious pilgrimage

== See also ==
- Kunwar, an Indian surname and title
  - Kunwar (title), the title specifically
  - Kunwar (surname), the surname specifically
- Kanwari, a village in Haryana, India
- Kanwarpura, a village in Chirawa, Jhunjhunu, Rajasthan, India
- Kanwarpur-Sultanpur, a village in Sultanpur, Uttar Pradesh, India
