= Bhimphedi =

Bhimphedi भीमफेदी
- Village development committee
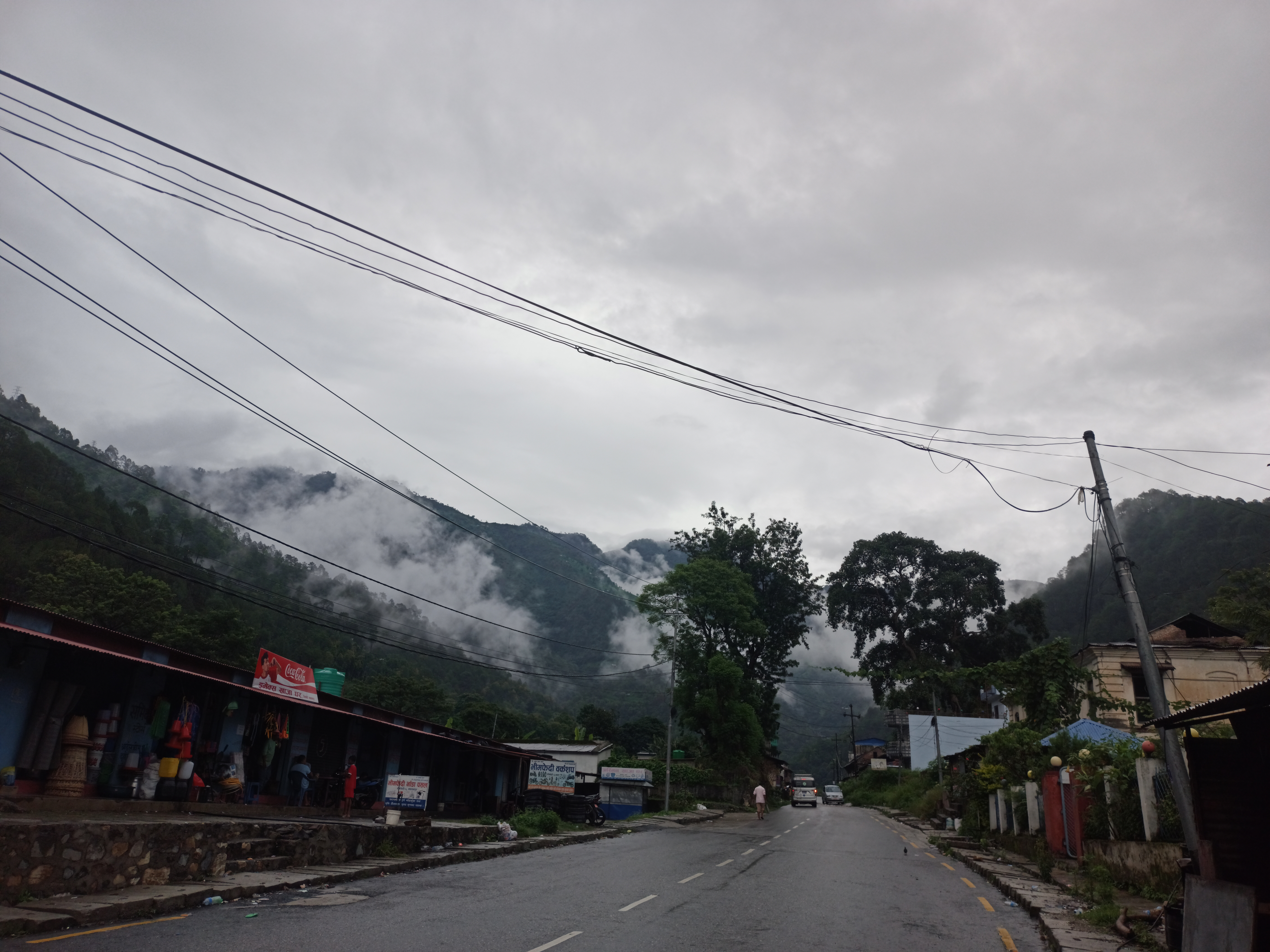
- Bhimphedi Bajaar

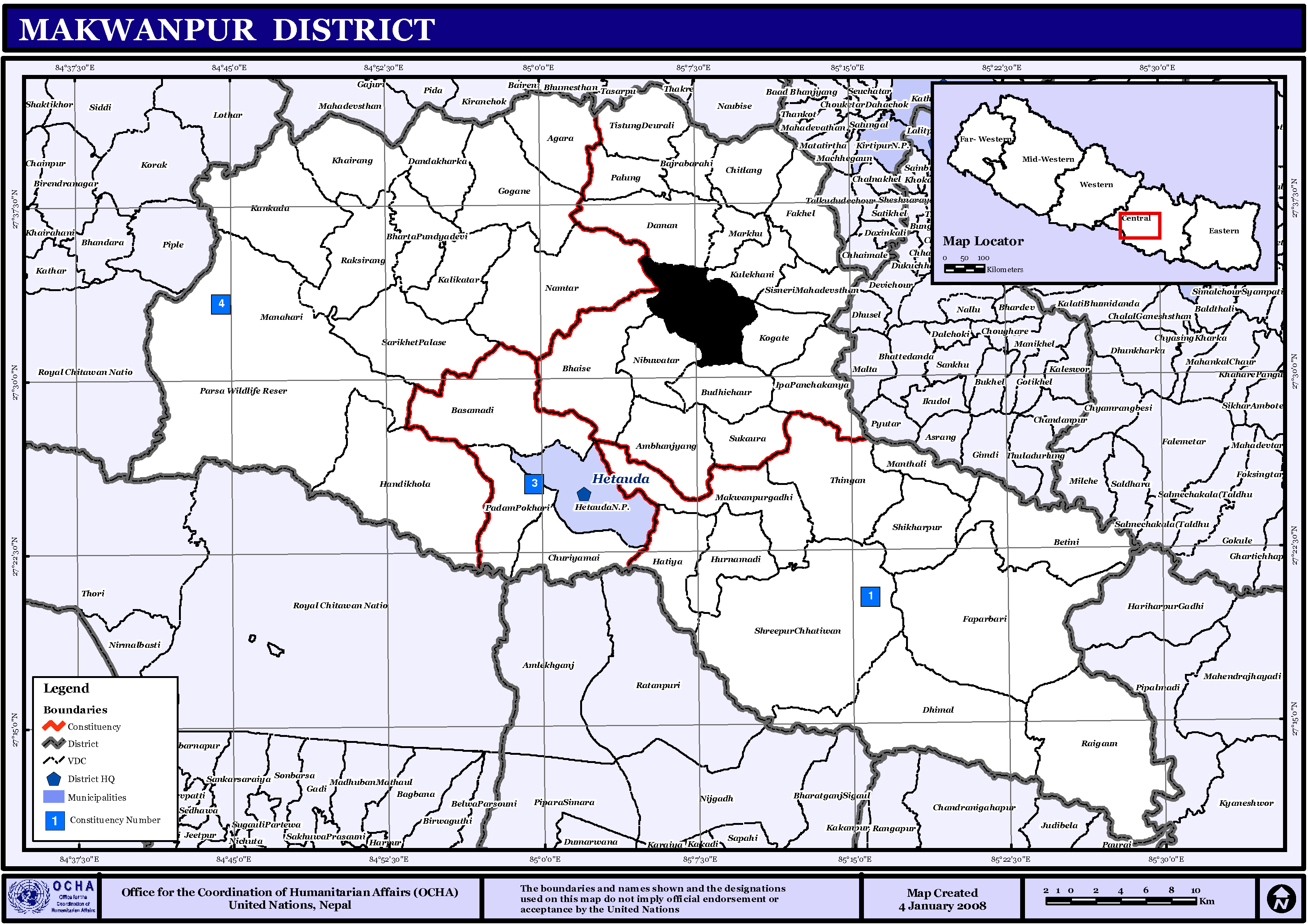
- Map of the Makwanpur showing Bhimphedi in black
- Interactive map of Bhimphedi
- Location in Nepal
- Coordinates: 27°33′0″N 85°7′30″E
- Country: Nepal
- Province: Bagmati Province
- District: Makwanpur District
- Rural municipality: Bhimphedi Rural Municipality

Population (1991)
  - Total: 5,742
- Time zone: UTC+5:45 (Nepal Time)

Bhimphedi (Nepali: भीमफेदी), is a village located in the Bhimphedi Rural Municipality of Makwanpur District of Bagmati Province of Nepal. This village is known for its bazaar (marketplace). Bismuth ore is mined here. Bhimphedi is also known for its beauty and glory for decades. This small city used to be the ancient central hub of Makwanpur district for decades. The one and only bridge to connect Nepal to India. Especially Paribazar also known as (दोहोरी बजार) used to be the Main city of ancient Bhimphedi. This beautiful ancient city was located at the bottom of Mountain Chisapani Gadhi. But History itself has been forgotten the ancient city Paribazar.

== Etymology ==
The word "Bhimphedi" comes from the Sanskrit name Bhīma (one of the Pāṇḍava brothers mentioned in the Mahabharata) and the Nepali word phedi which means the base of a hill. According to local beliefs, Bhīma and his brothers stayed in the forests near here during their time in exile, so the place was called Bhimphedi.

== History ==
Before the construction of highways, goods from India were taken to the Kathmandu Valley through here. The first motor vehicles in Nepal were physically carried by teams of men through this village.

This village served as the district headquarters of Makwanpur District before it was shifted to Hetauda. The village market suffered tremendously after the headquarters moved.

In the 1950s, a motorable road to Kathmandu from Amalekhganj (connecting to Raxaul, India) ended at Bhimphedi. This was the main access road to Kathmandu from the South.

== Geography ==
Bhimphedi is located to the south of the Kathmandu Valley in Makwanpur district of Bagmati Province, Nepal. The VDC is bounded by:

- North: Thaha Municipality, Indrasarobar Rural Municipality
- South: Nibuwatar VDC, Budhichaur VDC
- East: Sisneri Mahadevsthan VDC, Kogate VDC
- West: Namtar VDC, Bhainse VDC

== Demographics ==
According to 2001 Nepal census, there were 1107 houses in Bhimphedi and 5742 (49% male, 51% female) people. The main population living in the market are Newars. There are Tamang and Khas population in villages.

== Transportation ==
The main roads to Bhimphedi are:

- Hetaunda-Bhimphedi Road (23 km)
- Bhimphedi-Kulekhani-Fakhel-Kathmandu (53 km)
- Bhainse-Bhimphedi-Chitlang-Thankot Road (Ganesh Man Singh Road)

== See also ==
- Makwanpur District
- Narayani Zone
- Nepal
- Churia Tunnel
