= Thapa Kaji =

Total population
- Unknown

Regions with significant populations
- Nepal

Languages
- Nepali language

Religion
- Hindu

Thapa Kaji is a large social group of people of Jharra/Pure Chhettri caste (Kshatriya varna) in Nepal. Thapas of Uttrakhand And Himanchal State of India are considered as Pahari Rajput. Over a period of time, this community has spread to many parts of the world. The surname originated during the Khas Kingdom in Karnali region during middle age-it referred to a position/post of a warrior. Chhetri is considered a derivative form of the Sanskrit word Kshatriya.

"Kaji" means administrator or ruler. It was a hereditary family title awarded to some famous Nepali Kshatriya castes like Thapa, Basnyat/Basnet, Pande, and Kunwar etc. Majority of Thapas Chhetri speak the Nepali language as mother tongue. The Thapas Chhetris are divided into many sub-castes which are given with their Gotra Gana (One level higher than Gotra):

Bhardwaj Gotra : Achhami (अछामी थापा), Patkheti (पाटखेती थापा), Maharaji (महाराजी थापा), Bhandare/Bhandari (भण्डारे / भण्डारी थापा), Kalikote (कालिकोटे थापा)

Madgaulya Gotra : Kalikote (कालिकोटे थापा)

Atri : Khulal (खुलाल थापा), Punwar (पुवाँर थापा), Bagale (बगाले थापा), Bihare (बिहारे थापा)

Kasyap : Godar (गोदार थापा), Ghimire (घिमिरे थापा)

Kaundinya: Gaunle (गाउँले थापा)

Garg : Lamichhane (लामिछाने थापा)

Bashishtha : Suyal (सुयाल थापा)

The above division is through Gotra Gana, which could be also the Gotra, for example in Atri Gotra Gana of Bhramarishi Atri, there are 18 different Rishis in Atri Gana (they are; Atri, Prathama, Svasti, Krishna, Chandra, Pada, Aadima, Atreya, Vamarathya, Gavishtira, Rasa, Paurvatithya, Tithi, Bahutaka, Dhananjaya, Sumangala, Bijavapi and Saumangalya) which are taken as Gotra, among them Rishi Dhananjaya is taken as Gotra by Khulal Thapa (branch of them were Governor until Rana overthrew them) and Rishi Atreya as Gotra of Bagale Thapa of Atri Gotra Gana.

Thapa Chhetri are found in different parts of current Nepal and some parts of Uttarakhand and Himachal State of India. Currently many of the Thapa Chhetri are found in Nepal, and parts of India i.e. Sikkim, Himachal, Assam as well as in Bhutan and Myanmar. The Thapa Chhetri are Kshatriya or varna like Basnyat/Basnet of Nepal.

Thapas were the major political and military figures during and after the unification of the Nepal. Bir Bhadra Thapa was a Thapa of Chhetri group and leading Bharadar during Unification of Nepal. His grandson Bhimsen Thapa became Prime Minister of Nepal and established Thapa faction in the central power. Thapas were a major power base of Nepal in the 19th century starting from Mukhtiyar Bhimsen Thapa (first prime minister of Nepal). Then it was carried out and shined by Major other historical Nepalese hero like Amar Singh Thapa, Bhakti Thapa, and Mathabarsingh Thapa. Due to the unique relation between royal family of Nepal and Thapas, they were always viewed close to royal family. The Rana who ruled Nepal for 104 years were established by Jung Bahadur Rana who rise in power by support of his maternal uncle, Mathabarsingh Thapa who was Prime Minister. Modern Chhetri Thapa are Surya Bahadur Thapa was PM of Nepal for 5 times. Army chiefs Dharmapaal Barsingh Thapa, Pyar Jung Thapa. Gagan Thapa also belongs to Chhetri family.

== Notable Thapa Kaji ==
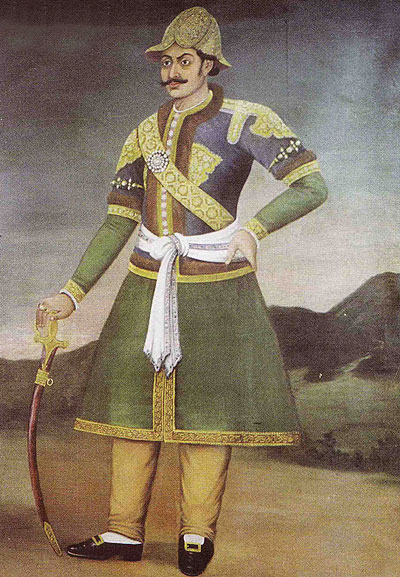
Bhimsen Thapa

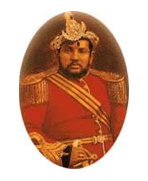
Gajraj Singh Thapa

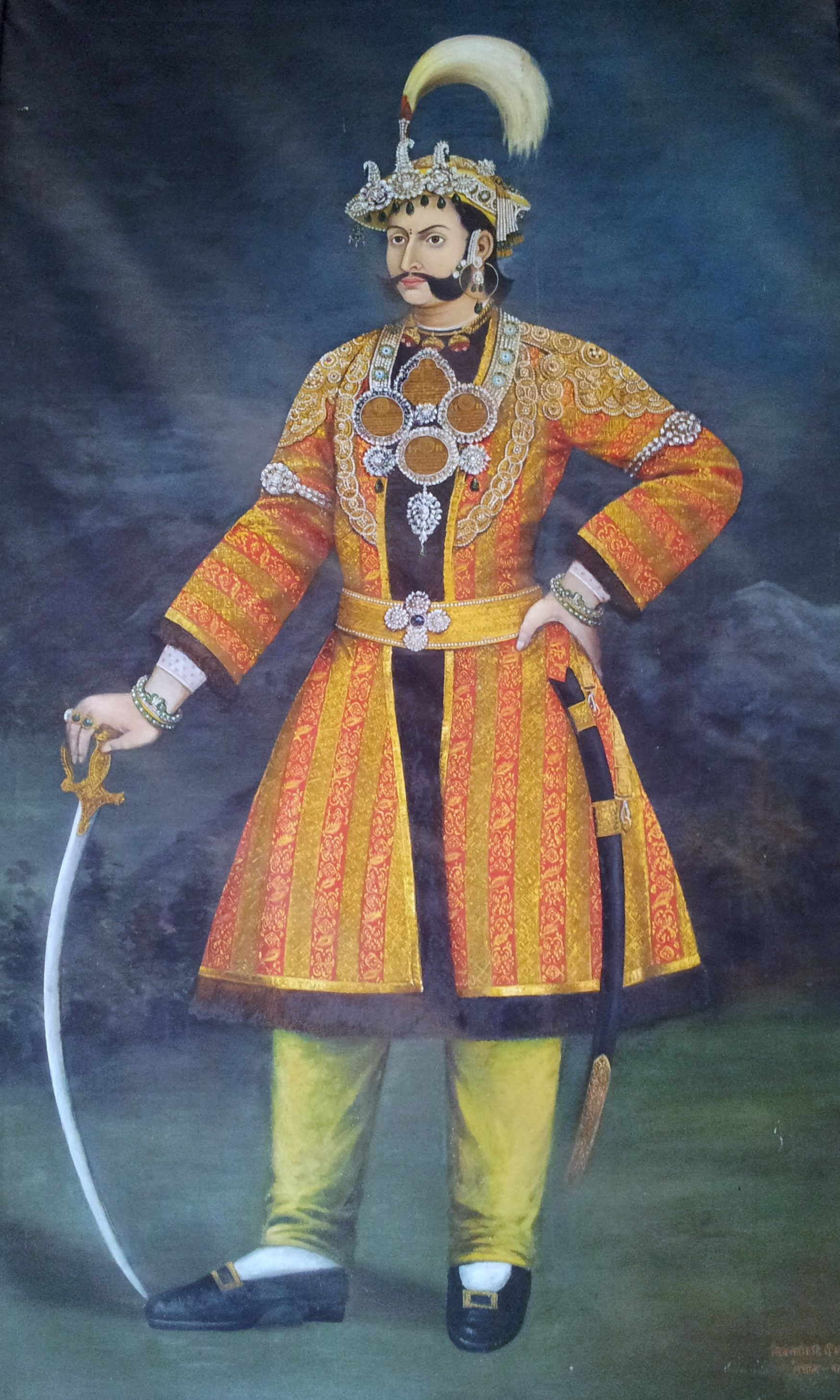
Mathabarsingh Thapa

- Amar Singh Thapa: Commander in chief during the Anglo-Nepal war also known as "The Living Lion" due to his bravery.
- Bhakti Thapa: given the title "The bravest of the brave" by the British for his bravery as he led a small group of Gurkha soldiers at the age of 70 and fought until death.
- Bhekh Bahadur Thapa, Former Foreign Affairs and Finance Minister and Diplomat
- Bhimsen Thapa: First prime minister of Nepal, who ruled from Susta in west to Teesta in the east (the greatest extension of Nepal)
- Bhola Thapa, Vice Chancellor of Kathmandu University
- Dhan Singh Thapa, Param Vir Chakra winner
- Dharmapaal Barsingh Thapa, Ex COAS
- Dharmaraj Thapa, poet with title "Janakavi Keshary"
- Gagan Thapa, Prominent youth leader from Nepali Congress
- Gajraj Singh Thapa, Tea Industry pioneer
- Ganesh Thapa, Ex-ANFA chairman
- Jharna Thapa, Nepali Actress
- Kamal Thapa, Former Deputy Prime Minister of Nepal and President of Rastriya Prajatantra Party
- Leeladhwaj Thapa, 1st novelist to win Madan Puraskar
- Manjushree Thapa, Nepali author of English-language books
- Mathabarsingh Thapa: First Prime Minister of Nepal to wear the crown, Nephew of Bhimsen Thapa, brother-in-law of King Rana Bahadur Shah, Maternal Uncle of Jung Bahadur Rana
- Nain Singh Thapa, General Kaji,
- Pyar Jung Thapa Ex COAS of Nepal Army
- Ranabir Singh Thapa, Kaji Commander of Makawanpur at Anglo-Nepalese war
- Rekha Thapa, Nepali Actress
- Sher Bahadur Thapa: Victoria Cross holder was only Nepali Kshetri to receive VC
- Shyam Bhakta Thapa, Ex IGP of Nepal Police
- Surya Bahadur Thapa, Five times PM of Nepal, who singlehandedly operated and protected autocratic Panchayat System
- Ujir Singh Thapa, Kaji Commander of Palpa at Anglo-Nepalese war
