= Bisht (surname) =

Bisht or Bista
- Language: Kumaoni, Garhwali, Mahasui, Kinnauri, Sirmauri, Nepali, Hindustani language

Origin
- Derivation: Bishishta (Distinguished)
- Meaning: Baron or landholder

Other names
- Variant forms: Bishta, Bista, Bist, Bajetha
- See also: Mahara, Rawat, Dhami, Airee, Negi, Rautela Panwar

Bisht (IPA: [bɪʃʈ]) is a surname found in the Indian states of Uttarakhand and Himachal Pradesh. Bisht was a title given by kings to nobles, derived from the Sanskrit vishisht ("distinguished"). The term "Bisht" originally referred to someone who held a land grant from the government. The Bisht families in Uttarakhand were chiefly Thokdars(Zamindars) of Thuljat (Note: The term "Thuljat" refers to Brahmins and Rajputs who say they are later immigrants from the plains) origin. In Uttrakhand, Bishts are generally Kshatriya as well as Brahmins in certain parts of East Uttrakhand. In Nepal, Bisht was adopted as a surname by Raute and Raji people. Bishta, as Bista, used as a surname by Khas people, group under the caste Chhetri.

== Notable people ==
- Ajay Mohan Bisht, better known as Yogi Adityanath; Chief Minister of Uttar Pradesh
- Dan Singh Bisht, Indian businessman and philanthropist
- Donal Bisht, Indian television actress
- Ekta Bisht, Indian cricket player
- Gajender Singh Bisht ( Ashoka Chakra, NSG Commando)
- Harish Bisht, vice admiral of the Indian Navy
- Himanshu Bisht, Indian cricketer
- Hira Singh Bisht, Indian politician
- Kavinder Bisht ( Indian Boxer )
- Lucky Bisht, former NSG commando, intelligence operative and Indian Spy
- Madhumita Bisht (born 1964), Indian badminton player
- Mahant Avaidyanath ( mahant Gorakhpur math )
- Mohan Singh Bisht (born 1957), Indian politician
- Nidhi Bisht ( Actress, Filmmaker, Lawyer )
- Paramjeet Singh Bisht ( Athlete Olympian)
- Puneet Bisht (born 1986), Indian cricketer
- Rajendra Singh Bisht ( 22nd Director General Indian Coast Guard)
- Ranbir Singh Bisht (1928–1998), Indian painter
- Ravindra Singh Bisht (born 1944), Indian archaeologist, Padma Shri
- Shruti Bisht (born 2002), Indian film and television actress
- Sonam Bisht, Indian model and actress
- Barkha Bisht Sengupta (born 1979), Indian television actress.
- Basanti Bisht ( Uttrakhand folk singer, Padma Shri)
- Vijay Kumar Bist ( Indian jurist)
- Jatin Singh Bisht Indian footballer
- Hira Singh Bisht ( Indian Politician )

== See also ==
- Bista
