= Karki (surname) =

कार्की
- Language: Nepali, Kumaoni

Origin
- Region of origin: Nepal, Uttarakhand

Other names
- See also: Thapa, Basnet, Khadka, Kunwar, Mahat, Bista

Karki is a Chhetri surname from Nepal and a Rajput clan from the Kumaon region of Uttarakhand.

== Khasa Kingdom ==
Karki was a title given to tax collecting officers in the medieval Khasa Kingdom. One branch of Karki Chhetris were rulers of the principality of Udayapur in Nepal.

== Karki Rajputs of Kumaon ==
Karki is a Rajput clan from the Kumaon region of Uttarakhand. The Karki Rajputs were among the four prominent feudal lords in the Kingdom of Kumaon who held higher status as Thakurs.

== Notable people ==
Notable people who bear the surname Karki include:

- Arjun Karki, Nepali ambassador
- Ashok Kumar Karki, Nepali weightlifter
- Bal Krishna Karki, Former Vice Chief of Army Staff (VCOAS) and Lieutenant general in the Nepali Army
- Bhuvan Karki, Nepali cricketer
- Bipin Karki, Nepali actor
- Bishnu Kumar Karki, Nepali politician
- Chanda Karki, Nepali politician
- Chetan Karki, Nepali songwriter and director
- Deep Karki, Nepali national footballer (goalkeeper)
- Dhanendra Karki, Nepali politician
- Dil Maya Karki, Nepali sprinter
- Dipak Karki, several Nepali politicians
- Ek Raj Karki, Nepali politician
- Ganesh Karki, Nepali politician
- Ganga Karki, Nepali politician
- George Prince Karki, Nepali national footballer and army captain
- Gillespye Jung Karki, Nepali national footballer
- Gyanendra Bahadur Karki, Nepali politician
- Hari Krishna Karki, Nepali judge and former Chief Justice of Nepal
- Hikmat Kumar Karki, Nepali politician and former Chief Minister of Koshi Province
- Himal Karki, Nepali politician
- Jitendra Karki, Nepali national footballer
- Kailash Karki, Nepali stand-up comedian
- Karishma Karki, Nepali swimmer
- Kedar Karki, Nepali politician and Chief Minister of Koshi Province
- Lokman Singh Karki, Nepali civil servant and former head of CIAA
- Maina Karki, Nepali politician
- Mallika Karki, Nepali singer
- Nitima Bhandari Karki, Nepali politician
- Neelam Karki "Niharika", Nepali poet
- Priyanka Karki, Nepali actress
- Ram Karki, Nepali politician
- Rosan Karki, Nepali politician
- Shrisha Karki, Nepali actress and model
- Suman Karki, Nepali actor, comedian and host
- Sushila Karki, Nepali interim Prime Minister, former Chief Justice of Nepal
- Sushma Karki, Nepali actress
- Swarup Singh Karki, Kaaji and later, Dewan of the Kingdom of Nepal (c.1775 – c.1777)
- Toshima Karki, Nepali politician, former Minister of State at Ministry of Health and Population (Nepal)
- Vidhan Karki, Nepali film director
