= Thapa =

Thapa थापा
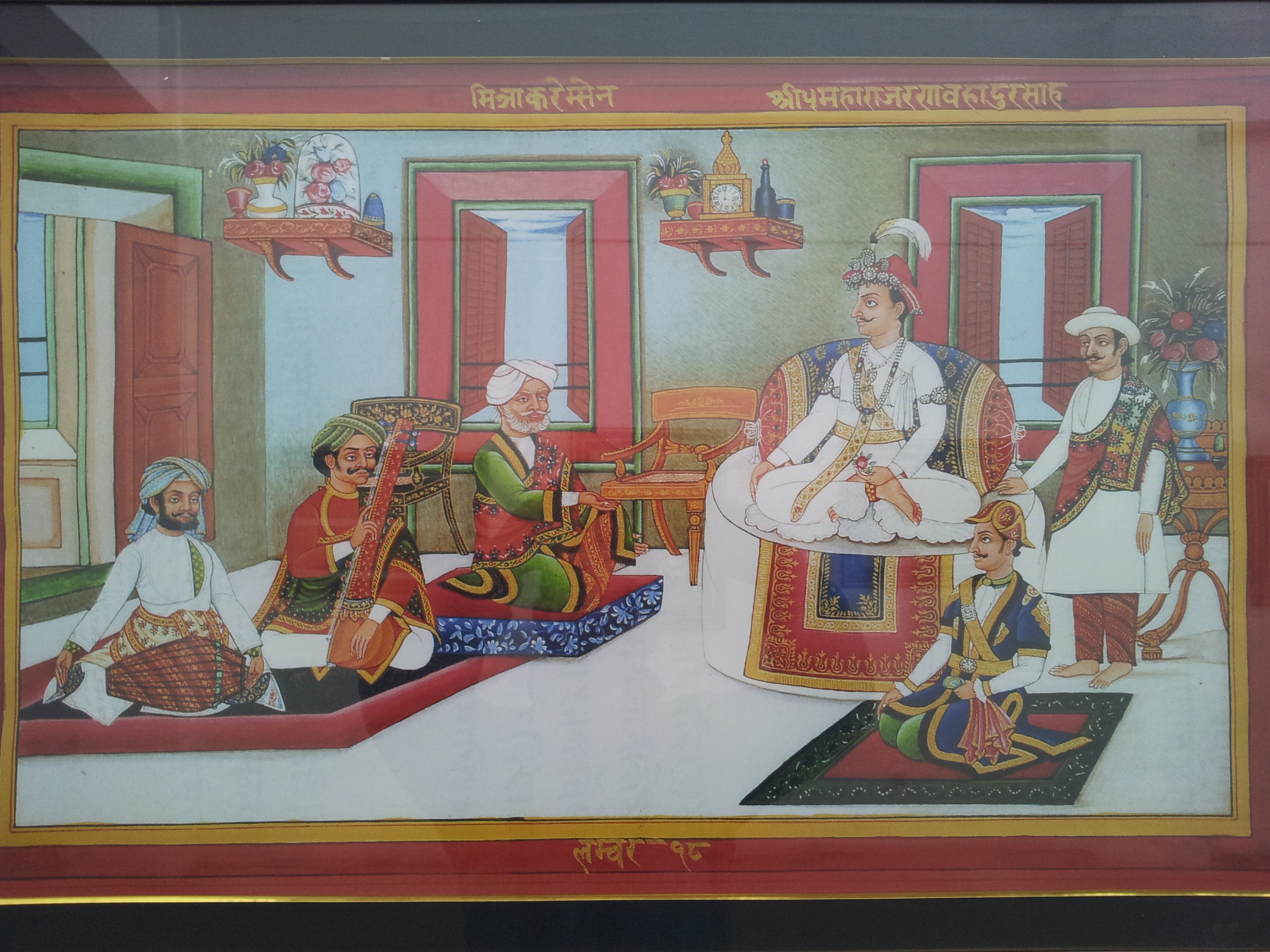
- Portrait of a Thapa Bhimsen Thapa, Thapa surname is associated with warriorhood
- Pronunciation: [t̪ʰāpā]
- Language: Nepali

Origin
- Language: Khasa language
- Meaning: Warrior

Other names
- Derivatives: Thapa Magar, Thapa Kshetri/Chhetri, Thapa Kaji,
- See also: Basnet, Rana, Karki, Khadka

Thapa is a surname used by multiple ethnic groups, including the Magar and Chhetri (Kshatriya) communities. While the surname also exists among Rajput groups in northern India. The surname Thapa was also widely used by the Magar community during the era of the Magarat confederations, where Magar Thapas held roles as local rulers, military commanders, and administrators.

== Etymology ==
Thapa was a Paikelā (warrior) rank of the medieval Khasa Kingdom. Other Paikelās include Khaḍgās, Rānās and Buḍhās. It is proved through many inscriptions in the present day region of Old Khas Kingdom. Yasu Thapa, Dasu Thapa and Raj Thapa were known warriors from the herostone pillars. One of the herostone inscription of Thapa warrior:

Be it auspicious. Yasu Thāpā, son of Bhimadev, established the herostone in 1256 Śaka Era.... Be it auspicious. Dhāmu Khaḍgā, son of Bhimadev established the herostone in 1256

— Śaka Era...

The above inscription also proved that Thapa and Khadka (Khadga) were mere military ranks that was born by sons of same father in the country of Khas people.

== Khas Thapa ==
Khas Thapa are patrilineal groups descended from Khas people . They are popularly known as Thapa Kshatriya or Thapa Kaji. This group was divided into many clans like Bagale Thapa, Godar, Hriksen, Punwar (Pawar), Suyal Lamichhane, and "Mugali"

Kshatriya Thapa dynasty were one of the four noble family to be involved in active politics of Nepal together with Rana dynasty, Basnyat/Basnets and Pandes, and ruled between 1806 and 1837 and 1843 to 1845, as prime ministers. Thapas played important role in Unification of Nepal and had held many prestigious post in the Malla Court and Bijayapur Court. This family grew prominent during the rule of King Prithvi Narayan Shah and were established as dominant faction during reign of King Rana Bahadur Shah. After the assassination of King Rana Bahadur Shah, Bhimsen Thapa rose to the event killing all his enemies and catapulting the Thapa family as most dominant faction in the Royal Court of Nepal.

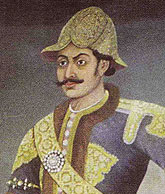
Bhimsen Thapa, First Mukhtiyar of Nepal, leading member of Thapa dynasty

Thapa family were strengthened in the Royal court by including family members of another Thapa Bharadar Amar Singh Thapa. Bada (Elder) Kaji Amar Singh Thapa was a legendary military commander and National Hero of Nepal. Thapas have important role in Anglo-Nepalese War where British colonial power the East India Company had major loss at First Campaign. Colonel Ujir Singh Thapa was sector commander at Jitgadh, Kaji Ranajor Singh Thapa at Jaithak, Sardar Bhakti Thapa at Deuthal, Colonel Ranabir Singh Thapa at Makawanpurgadhi and Bada Kaji (Elder Kaji) Amar Singh Thapa at Malaon. Bhimsen's nephew PM Mathabarsingh Thapa was known for his charisma from whom Jung Bahadur Rana rose to power. Thus, the state of administrative Thapa rule in Nepal is politically termed as Thapadom. Since the Shahs have ruled over Nepal, Chhetri Thapas have been struggling against Pandeys, Kunwars, Basnyats and other Chhetris to take over the royal court of Nepal.

=== Bagale Thapa ===
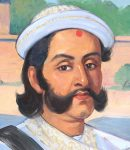
Mathabarsingh Thapa, noblemen from Bagale Thapa Kshatri clan

Bagale Thapa (Nepali:बगाले थापा) is a prominent clan within Khas Thapa. Bagale Thapas were skillful at both warfare and administration. They claim Aatreya Gotra in the Gotra system of Hinduism.

The progenitor of Bagale Thapas from the account of Bagale Thapa Vamsawali

....श्री शाकेः ।। ११११ सम्वत् १२४६ साल देषि थापाहरूका सन्तति कुलका आदि कालु थापा हुनः ।। १ ।। कालु थापाका चेला ४ जेठा पुन्याकर थापाः ।। माहिँला तारापति थापाः ।। साहिँला विरु थापाः ।। कान्छा धर्मराज थापाः ।। पुलामका जेठा हुनः ।। ताकमका माहिँला हुनः ।। जमरिकका कान्छा जसोधर थापा (धर्मराज) हुनः तिनले जमरिकमा राज्य गर्याः ताहाँ देषि तिनी आयाका हुनः ।। २ ।।.....

— Bagale Thapa Vamsāwali (genealogy) part republished by Yogi Naraharinath

The genealogy traces the lineage of all Bagale Thapas to male progenitor (Mūlapuruṣa) King Kalu Thapa Kshatri, who first ascended to the throne at Kāndāmālikā on Saka Era 1111. The DDC of Myagdi district also confirms historical evidence of rule of Thapa dynasty of Takam State (1246-1545 B.S.) by founder Kalu Thapa, whose dynasty continued for 300 years only to be defeated by Dimba Bam Malla to form bigger Parbat State.

Amar Singh Thapa, the war hero of Anglo-Nepalese war belongs to this clan. Similarly, Prime Minister Bhimsen Thapa, the most revered among Thapas (who was also an autocratic usurper) also belongs to this clan. His nephew Mathabarsingh Thapa was the seventh Prime Minister of Nepal. Roshi Thapa Kaji

=== Godar Thapa ===
Godar Thapa is a clan within Chhetri Thapa Kaji of Khas origin. They claim Kashyap Gotra in the Gotra system of Hinduism.

- Dilli Jung Thapa, engineer
- Gajraj Singh Thapa tea planter
- Birbhadra Thapa
- Ratna Shumsher Thapa
- Dharmapaal Barsingh Thapa
- Pyar Jung Thapa, Chief of Staff of the Nepalese Army
- Bhesh Bahadur Thapa
- Sher Jung Thapa
- Yagya Bahadur Thapa
- Gagan Thapa

=== Punwar/ Panwar Thapa ===
Punwar Thapa (Nepali: पुँवर थापा) is another clan of Thapa Chhetri/Khasas. Punwar/ Panwar, a variant of Parmara dynasty, is a Rajput honorific claimed by different groups. Punwar Thapas claim their ancestry from Rajasthan, India. Sardar Bhakti Thapa a war commander at Anglo-Nepalese war, belonged to the Punwar Thapa clan. Punwar Thapa in Nepal has roots in Rainaskot, Lamjung District.

=== Lamichhane Thapa ===
They Belong to Garg Gotra. They were residents of Western Nepal then later they came and settled in Sarangkot, Kaski. They served in various military campaigns during the unification and expansion of Nepal and settled in newly acquired regions of expanding kingdom. Sardar Ram Krishna Thapa, ancestor of Surya Bahadur Thapa, was appointed administrator of newly acquired eastern province and settled in Mugu, Dhankuta. His youngest brother, Dharma Raj Thapa, was sent to Tityang, Baglung and that's where his descendants can be found today. Only non Tibetan/Mongolian Victoria Cross winner of Nepal Sher Bahadur Thapa, Former 5 time Prime Minister Surya Bahadur Thapa and Janakabi Dharmaraj Thapa are some notable people of this Khasa clan of Thapa Kaji. Poet Dharmaraj Thapa had published a Lamichhane Thapa genealogy in 1982.

=== Parajuli Thapa ===
Thapa Parajuli or Parajuli Thapa belong to Kaudinya (कौडिण्यः) Gotra in Hindu System. Parajuli Thapas were mentioned in the legend of the Kunwar family. They waged a war against the King of Kaski who wanted the daughter of a nobleman Ahirama Kunwar without legal marriage (as a concubine). Ahirama Kunwar denied the request of the King and Parajuli Thapas successfully protected and helped Ahirama Kunwar to escape to Gorkha Kingdom with his two other sons, one being the later Gorkhali warlord Ram Krishna Kunwar. They often write as "Thapa-Parajuli" these days, and notable among them is Dr. Resham Thapa-Parajuli, a prominent economist of Nepal.

== Magar Thapa ==
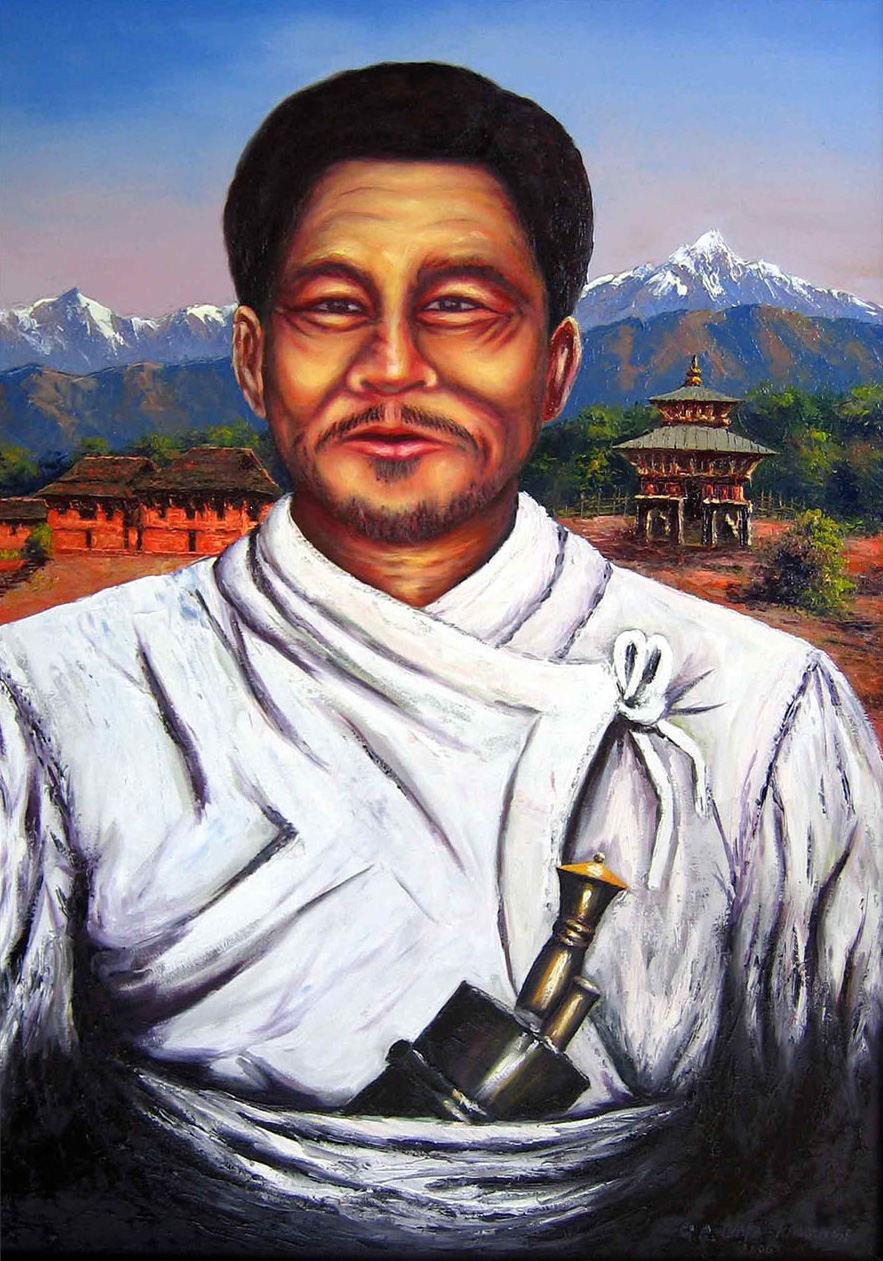
Lakhan Thapa Magar, First Martyr of Nepal; an ethnic Magar

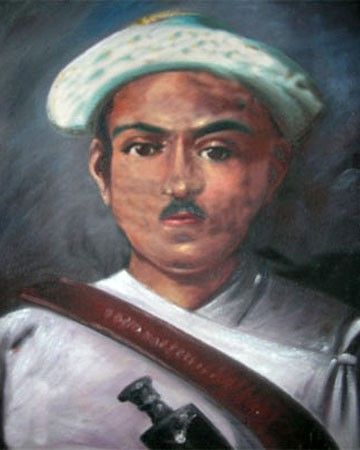
Kaji Biraj Thapa Magar, 1st Army Chief of Prithvi Narayan Shah of Gorkha and the 'Kingmaker'

== Notable People from the Magar Community ==
The original home of the Magar people is Nepal and more population are around Gulmi, Argha, Khanchi, and Palpa Rukum Rolpa Piuthan . This bit of country was divided into twelve districts known as Barha Magarat (Confederation of Twelve Magar district) During the medieval period (17 century), the large area from Dhading to Sikkim was called the Magarat. A second Confederation of Eighteen Magar district known as Athara Magarat also existed which was primarily inhabited by Kham Magars. Magars who are the Magar language speaking group are the largest indigenous ethics group of Nepal whose presence are from east to west in Nepal. They have played vital role during reunification of Nepal.

Thapa magars is one of the seven tribes (clans) of the Magar community. In former days, any Magars who had lost three generations of ancestors in battle became a Rana Magar To name a few—other Thapa Magar clans include Saru-Thapa, Gaha-Thapa, Reshmi-Thapa and they are each further sub-divided into many sub-clans.

Famous Thapa Magars include Arun Thapa, Lakhan Thapa Magar, Biraj Thapa Magar, Victoria Cross holders like Kulbir Thapa, Lalbahadur Thapa and Netrabahadur Thapa.

== Links with Indian Royals ==
Thapas have marital links with Maratha Chhattari royals of Baroda State. Pyar Jung Thapa's daughter, Pragya Shree was married to former King of Baroda State Pratap Singh Rao Gaekwad's grandson Pratapsinh Sangramsinh Gaekwad.

== Modern times ==
Modern day Thapas are prominent in wide professions. Manjushree Thapa, an English language author is known for Forget Kathmandu: An Elegy for Democracy (2005), was shortlisted for the Lettre Ulysses Award in 2006. Gagan Thapa, a popular 40-year-old minister is in the Nepalese cabinet. Ujwal Thapa, the President of Bibeksheel Nepali was a leading youth activist and entrepreneur.
