= Bohora =

- Language: Doteli

Other names
- Variant form: Bohara
- See also: Mahat, Katwal, Rayamajhi, Budhathoki

Bohora or Bohara is a surname found among the Chhetris of Nepal and the Kumaoni Rajputs in Uttarakhand, India.

Bohora belonged to Thar Ghar aristocracy group which assisted the rulers of Gorkha Kingdom.

== Notable people ==
- Abinash Bohara (born 1997), Nepalese cricketer
- Amrit Kumar Bohara (born 1948), Nepalese politician
- Deepak Bohara (1951–2025), Nepalese politician
- Moti Lal Bohora, former chief of the Nepal Police
- Ram Bahadur Bohara, Nepalese politician
