= Khadka =

KHAS Surname list

Khadka खड्का
Origin
- Language: Khas language
- Origin: Khasa kingdom
- Derivation: Khadga (sword)
- Meaning: Sword bearer

Other names
- Cognates: Katwal, Khandayat
- Derivatives: Khadka Kshatri, Khadka kaji, Maharajhi Khadka, Kalikote Khadka
- See also: Kunwar, Basnet, Karki, Thapa

Khadka (Nepali: खड्का), anciently called as Khaḍka (Sanskrit: खड्गा), is a surname of Khas/Chhetri caste. Khadga was an ancient Paikelā (warrior) rank along with Thāpā, Rānā and Buḍhā chhetri. The last King Mansingh Khadka Magar of Majhakot (Gorkha), before Drabya Bikram Shah became King of Gorkha.

== Kunwar Khadka clan ==
Prime Minister of Nepal Jung Bahadur Kunwar Rana belonged to the Kunwar family of the Khadka clan. The Kunwar family genealogy also states the title of 'Kunwar Khadka' which was taken by the ancestors of the Kunwar family.

...The hill Raja asked for the daughter of Raja of Bīnātī, a Bagāle Kṣetrī and married her to Rāma Siṃha. They had six sons over 10–12 years, one of whom was recognized by the title of Kum̐vara Khaḍkā for bravery displayed in the battle against Raja of Satān Koṭ. The title was used by his descendants....

— The Kunwar family genealogy by Daniel Wright

After the premiership of Jung Bahadur Kunwar, the Kunwar family through a royal order took up the title of Rana and claimed themselves as Rajput family of Chittor in India and founded the Rana dynasty.

== Notable people ==
- Hari Khadka, football player
- Hari Bahadur Khadka, Member of 2nd Constituent Assembly
- Khum Bahadur Khadka, former minister
- Kul Bahadur Khadka, Lieutenant General
- Narayan Khadka, ex minister of urban development
- Nirajan Khadka, football player
- Paras Khadka, cricket player
- Pradeep Khadka, actor
- Purna Bahadur Khadka, senior politician
- Shweta Khadka, actress
- Sumi Khadka, actress
- Swastima Khadka, actress

== See also ==
- Rana
- Raut
- Karki
