= Katuwal =

Katuwal कटवाल
- Language: Nepali, Doteli

Origin
- Language: Khas language
- Origin: Khasa kingdom
- Derivation: Katta (sword)
- Meaning: Sword bearer

Other names
- Variant forms: Katwal, Katawal, Katowal
- Cognate: Khadka,
- Derivatives: Katwal Chhetri, Katwal Ekthariya

Katuwal, Katawal, Katwal (Nepali: कटवाल) is a Chhetri / Khas Rajput surname used in Nepal, Uttarakhand, Himachal Pradesh, Sikkim. They belong to Ekthariya (Note: The word Ekthariya is composed of two words; Ek (one) and thar (clan). Thus, it means one belonging to a single clan.) subcaste that is widely accepted to be of Jharra Chhetri origin, which is in contrast to Bahuthariya (multiple clan) Chhetri subcaste . They were one of a subcaste of the Tagadhari Chhetri community of Mandavya Gotra. They were actively involved in Bhardar family aristrocracy throughout the Nepalese history of Khas Kingdom and western province of Kingdom of Gorkha. They belong to Jharra Chhetri.

== Notable people ==
Notable people bearing the name or its variants include:

- Jeet Ram Katwal, Indian MLA in Himachal Pradesh
- Manoj Katuwal, Nepali cricket player who played for the Nepal National Cricket Team between 2002 and 2006
- General Rookmangud Katawal, former Chief of Army Staff of the Nepali Army
- Hari Bhakta Katuwal, prominent poet and lyricist of Nepal

== See also ==
- Naule Katuwal, named after Katuwals
- Mahat
- Budhathoki
- Rayamajhi
- Raut
- Bohara
- Chauhan
