= Katuwal (messenger) =

Human messenger

Katuwal[Don't misinterpret with Chhetri Katuwal] is a Nepalese term for a messenger. A person who roams or walks to a village or villages and delivers messages to people of villages or loudly announces programs organized by the government or an institution is a Katuwal.

This is an old system which is still in use in some villages of Nepal. The main reason of this system to be still in use in some villages of Nepal is because they are not connected to other areas via roads and other transportation means.
