= Chhetri (name) =

Chhetri is a surname. Notable people with the surname include:

- Sunil Chhetri (born 1984), Indian professional footballer
- Sanjog Chhetri (1982–2002), Indian Army Ashoka Chakra recipient
- Ayush Chhetri (born 2003), Indian footballer
- Jharra Chhetri

== See also ==
- Chhetri
