= Churia =

Churia may refer to:

- Churia Tunnel, a highway tunnel in Nepal
- Sivalik Hills, or Churia Hills, a mountain range of the outer Himalayas
