= Chisapani Gadhi =

Historic fort in central Nepal

- चिसापानी गढी (Nepali)
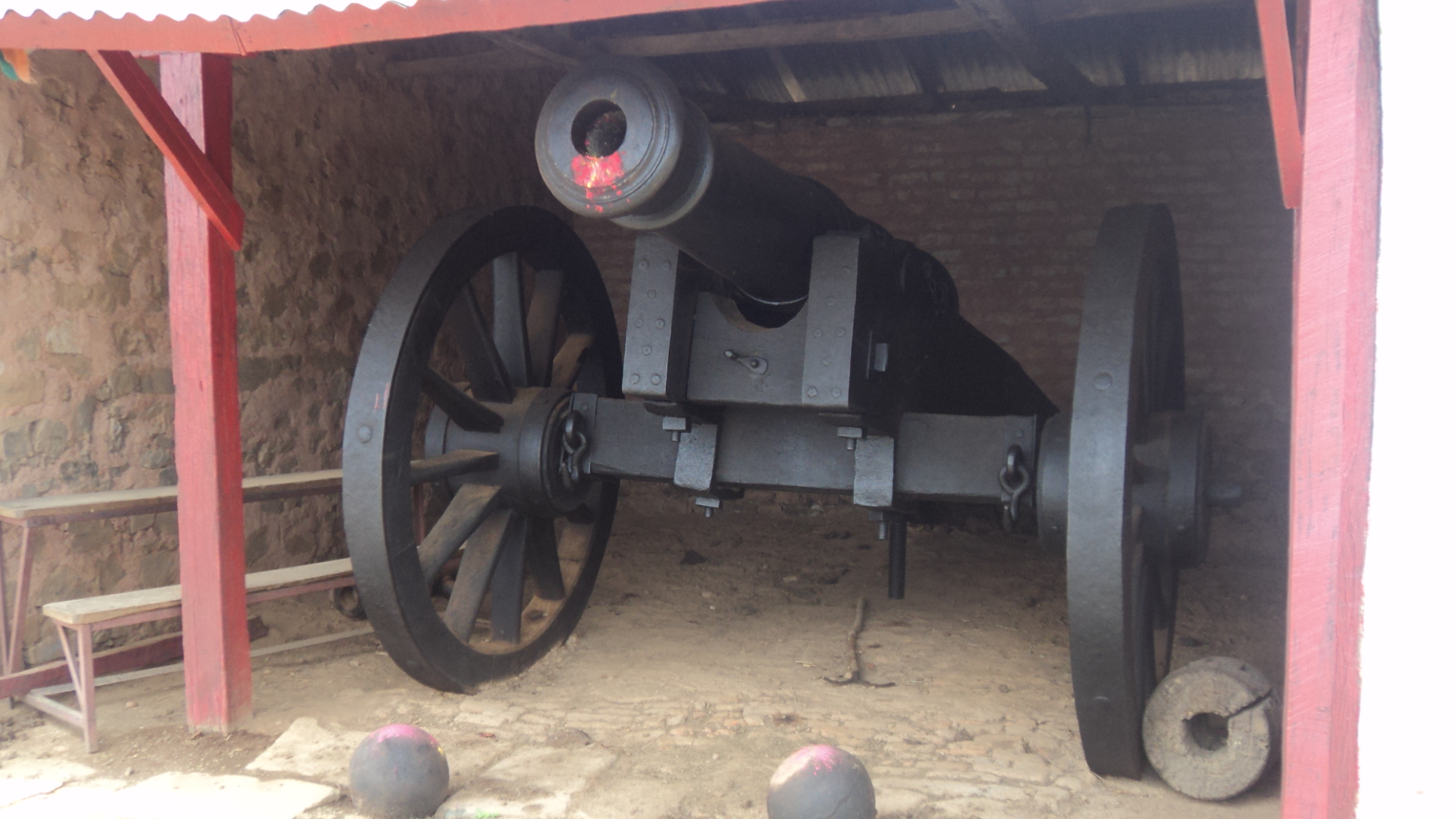
- The big cannon located at the fort.
- Interactive map of Chisapani Gadhi
- 27°33′30″N 85°08′15″E
- Type: Fort
- Location: Bhimphedi, Nepal

Site notes
- Owner: Nepal

The Chisapani Gadhi is a fort in Bhimphedi, Makwanpur that was built around 1744–1745 AD. The fort was controlled by the Sen Dynasty but after the Gorkha Kingdom (later became known as the Kingdom of Nepal) captured Makwanpur they used the fort for the military, administrative, trade and immigration purposes. King Prithvi Narayan Shah used it to create an economic blockade to the Kathmandu Valley. According to historians, the fort had a court, a check post, and an office for a local governor. During the Anglo-Nepalese War, commander Ranabir Singh Thapa deployed many soldiers inside the fort. But the forces did not directly face the East India Company. Thapa at the Makwanpur Gadhi stopped the Company troops from getting into the fort, and they subsequently went moved to capture the Sim Bhanjyang instead.

The fort also contains a Batuk Bhairav Temple. Females are not allowed to go inside the fort. The ancient rule is still practised. There is a myth circulating that if a woman enters they might die or become unlucky. Some local residents say that the sound of the big cannon firing caused miscarriages. Journalist Durga Lamichhane went inside the fort and the temple many times, and she said that the local residents created a rumour that she had died. Women's rights activists have spoken out against this in the past. The caretaker of the fort told that "the sight of women, the weaker sex, inside the fort tended to weaken the soldiers in their resolve".

Cannons and iron-balls located at the fort are preserved. In 2019, The Kathmandu Post reported that the Gadhi was being renovated. The government gave one million Nepalese rupees (NPR); the Bhimphedi Rural Municipality added 600,000 NPR, and the provincial government funded three million NPR to restore the site. ECS Nepal described the fort as it "looked in a pitiably run-down state".
