= Rout (surname) =

Rout is a surname. It may refer to:

- Alexandra Rout (born 1993), New Zealand figure skater
- Baji Rout, Indian boy shot dead by police in British India
- Ettie Annie Rout (1887–1936), New Zealand writer and educator
- Girjia Rout, Indian cricketer
- Jachindra Rout, Indian Odia-language poet and translator
- Joanne Rout, British Paralympic swimmer
- Jyoti Rout, Indian classical dancer
- Padmini Rout (born 1994), Indian chess player
- Saraswati Rout, Indian weightlifter
- Satyabrata Rout, Indian theatre director and scenographer
