= Bhimphedi Rural Municipality =

Bhimphedi (RM) भीमफेदी गाउँपालिका
- Rural Municipality
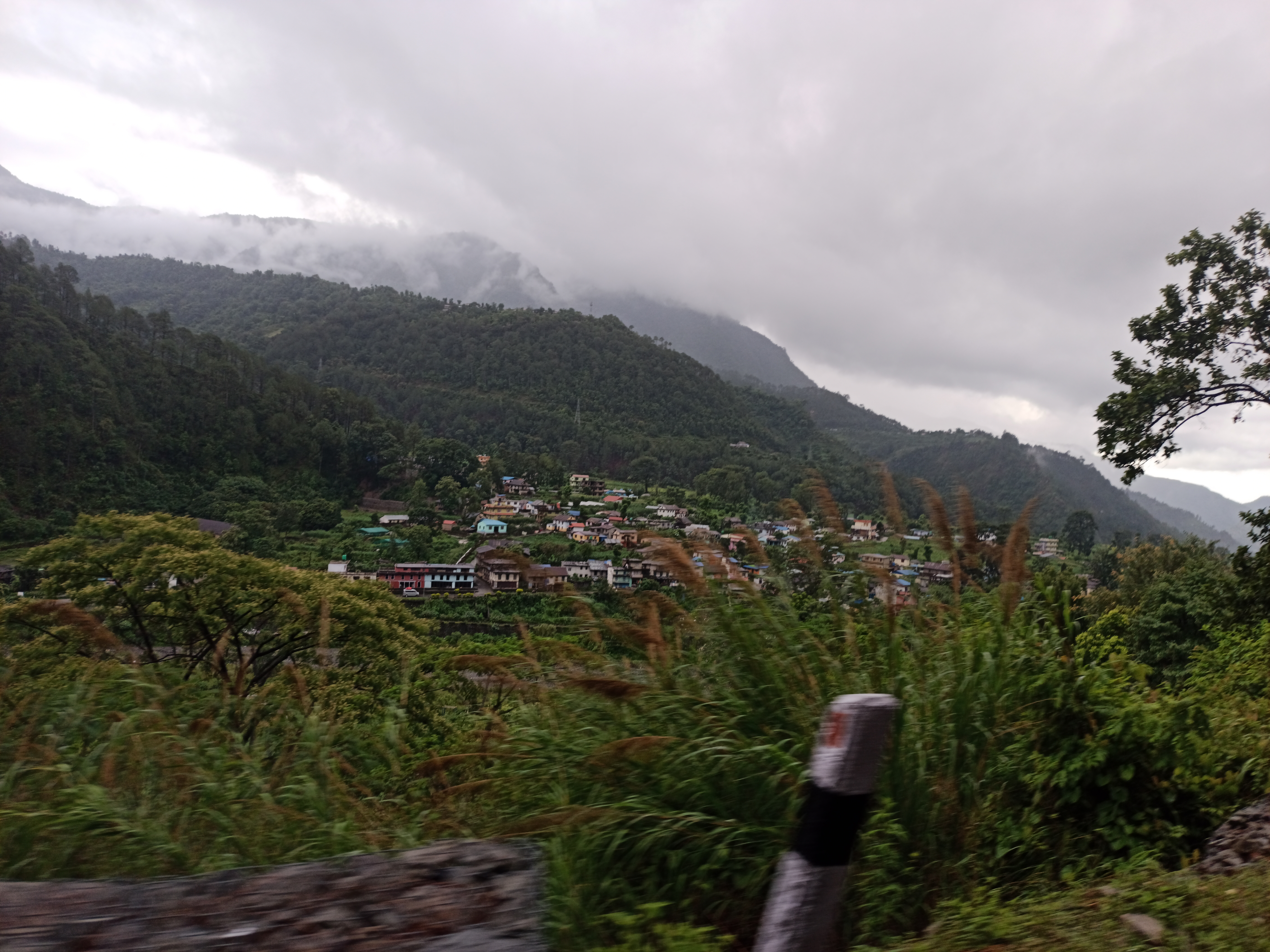
- Interactive map of Bhimphedi (RM)
- Location Bhimphedi (RM) (Nepal)
- Coordinates: 27°33′0″N 85°7′30″E
- Country: Nepal
- Province: Bagmati
- District: Makawanpur
- Wards: 9
- Established: 10 March 2017

Government
  - Type: Rural Council
  - Chairperson: Mr. Hidam Lama
  - Vice-chairperson: Mrs. Parvati Rana
  - Term of office: (2017 - 2022)

Area
  - Total: 245.27 km^{2} (94.70 sq mi)

Population (2011)
  - Total: 23,344
  - Density: 95.177/km^{2} (246.51/sq mi)
- Time zone: UTC+5:45 (Nepal Standard Time)
- Previous Headquarter: Bhimphedi
- Website: bhimphedimun.gov.np

Bhimphedi is a Rural municipality located within the Makawanpur District of the Bagmati Province of Nepal. The rural municipality spans 245.27 square kilometres (94.70 sq mi) of area, with a total population of 23,344 according to the 2011 Nepal census.

On March 10, 2017, the Government of Nepal restructured the local level bodies into 753 new local level structures. The previous Bhimphedi, Bhainse, Nibuwatar, Kogate, Ipa Panchakanya and portion of Namtar VDCs were merged to form Bhimphedi Rural Municipality. Bhimphedi is divided into 9 wards, with Bhimphedi VDC declared the administrative center of the rural municipality.

== Demographics ==
At the time of the 2011 Nepal census, Bhimphedi Rural Municipality had a population of 24,960. Of these, 55.4% spoke Tamang, 39.8% Nepali, 1.6% Newar, 1.3% Chepang, 0.7% Magar, 0.6% Maithili, 0.2% Bhojpuri, 0.1% Rai, 0.1% Tharu and 0.1% other languages as their first language.

In terms of ethnicity/caste, 58.9% were Tamang, 14.2% Magar, 7.3% Hill Brahmin, 7.0% Chhetri, 3.3% Chepang/Praja, 3.3% Newar, 2.9% Kami, 0.7% Damai/Dholi, 0.4% Rai, 0.3% Gurung, 0.3% Sunuwar, 0.2% Sarki, 0.1% Terai Brahmin, 0.1% Gharti/Bhujel, 0.1% Kathabaniyan, 0.1% Koiri/Kushwaha, 0.1% Musalman, 0.1% Teli, 0.1% Thakuri, 0.1% Tharu, 0.1% Yadav and 0.4% others.

In terms of religion, 51.9% were Buddhist, 43.9% Hindu, 3.4% Christian, 0.2% Prakriti, 0.1% Muslim and 0.4% others.

In terms of literacy, 66.4% could read and write, 3.0% could only read and 30.5% could neither read nor write.
