= Ipa Panchakanya =

Ipa Panchakanya इपापञ्चकन्या
- Village development committee
- Location in Nepal
- Coordinates: 27.48°N 85.22°E
- Country: Nepal
- Province: Bagmati Province
- District: Makwanpur District
- Rural municipality: Bhimphedi Rural Municipality

Population (1991)
  - Total: 2,335
- Time zone: UTC+5:45 (Nepal Time)

Ipa Panchakanya is a village development committee in the Bhimphedi Rural Municipality of Makwanpur District in the Bagmati Province of southern Nepal. At the time of the 1991 Nepal census it had a population of 2335 people living in 395 individual households.
