= Gatisheel Loktantrik Party =

Political party in Nepal

Dynamic Democratic Party गतिशील लोकतान्त्रिक पार्टी
- Chairperson: Dinesh Prasai
- General secretary: Piyush Prasad Kayastha
- Founder: Birendra Bahadur Basnet
- Founded: 16 October 2025; 8 months ago
- Headquarters: Kathmandu
- Ideology: Democratic socialism Federalism
- Political position: Centre-left to left-wing
- ECN Status: Registered Party
- Seats in Pratinidhi Sabha: 0 / 275
- Seats in Rastriya Sabha: 0 / 59
- Seats in Provincial Assemblies: 0 / 550
- Chief Ministers: 0 / 7
- Mayors/Chairs: 0 / 753
- Councillors: 0 / 35,011
- Number of provinces in government: 0 / 7

The Gatishil Loktantrik Party (Nepali: गतिशील लोकतान्त्रिक पार्टी, lit. 'Dynamic Democratic Party') is a political party in Nepal chaired by Dinesh Prasai and launched by chairman of Buddha Air, Birendra Bahadur Basnet.

== See also ==
- Buddha Air
- Birendra Bahadur Basnet
