= Budhathoki =

Budha chhetri Surname list

- Language: Nepali, Doteli, Kumaoni

Origin
- Language: Khas language
- Origin: Khasa kingdom

Other names
- Variant form: Budhathoki
- Derivatives: Budhathoki Kshetri, Budhathoki Chhetri, Budhathoki Brahmin
- See also: Mahat, Katwal, Rayamajhi, Raut, Bohara, Chauhan

Budhathoki (Nepali: बुढाथोकी) is a surname of the Tagadhari Brahmin/Chhetri group of the Khas community of Nepal. People with the Budhathoki surname reside mostly in Nepal and India.
