= Chandra Canal =

Irrigation canal project in Saptari, Nepal

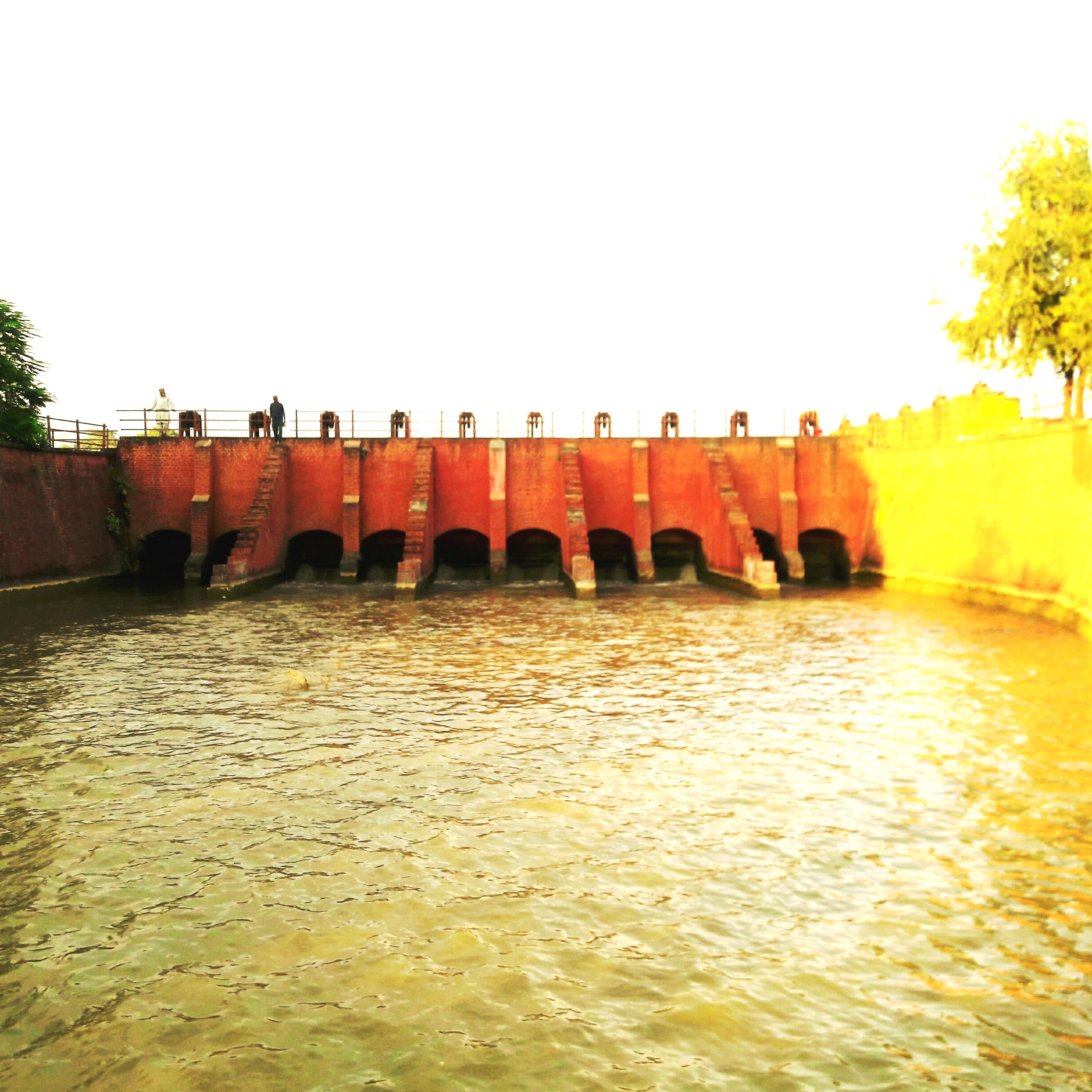
- Canal Dam as seen from west

- Location within Nepal
- Interactive map of Chandra Canal
- Location: Saptakoshi Municipality, Saptari
- Coordinates: 26.741378°N 86.929619°E
- Type: Irrigation Canal
- Part of: Triyuga river, Koshi
- Basin countries: Koshi, Nepal
- Salinity: 3.4–3.5%
- Max. temperature: 25 °C (77 °F)
- Min. temperature: 5 °C (41 °F)

The Chandra Canal (Nepali: चन्द्र नहर pronounced as chandra nahar) is an irrigation canal project established in the northeastern Saptari district of Nepal by Chandra Shumsher Jang Bahadur Rana, one of the Prime Ministers during the Rana era (1846–1951) of Nepal, was the first canal in the country. It is originated from the Triyuga river at Fattepur. The canal was constructed by the first engineer of Nepal, Dilli Jung Thapa.

== History ==
In the context of Nepal, concept and management of irrigation development has started in the collective activism and participation of local farmers than the state. It seems that the state is interested in irrigation as early as the basis of raising water or irrigation in the state system and controlling the society based on the economy provided economy. It seems that the local government has started regulating the beginning of the Shah-e-era in relation to the traditional irrigation area, which has been constructed, operated and managed, based on its own source, skill and technology. State Government of India Beginning in 1922 (1979 B.S.), the construction started. Chandra Nahar Canal irrigation system completed in 1928 (1985 B.S.) is the first modern irrigation system built from the state. Apart from this, in 1950 (2007 B.S.), before the patronage of democracy, the Jamshed Canal (Manushmaara) in Saralahi district, Jagirdashpur dam in Kapilavastu and Pargi dam in Pokhara were started.

Due to the lack of human power related to human rights, there should be a direct contribution to the state's limited contribution only due to the dependence on foreign manpower, and from the district structure rather than the different structure of the organization.

The challenge to confirm the basis of justification, achievement and achievement of establishment of separate irrigation from the Ministry of Water is not going to cross the federal form, as it is preparing for conducting irrigation activities in the form of water sources. Last modified two years ago, in the 73 districts across the country, five regional irrigation directorates and irrigation management and underground water irrigation directorate besides the Department of Irrigation and irrigation.

== Origin and location ==
Actually, Chandra Nahar is originated from the reservoir built in the Kali Khola which is joined with Triyuga River at about 2 km north from the dam site.

== Gallery ==
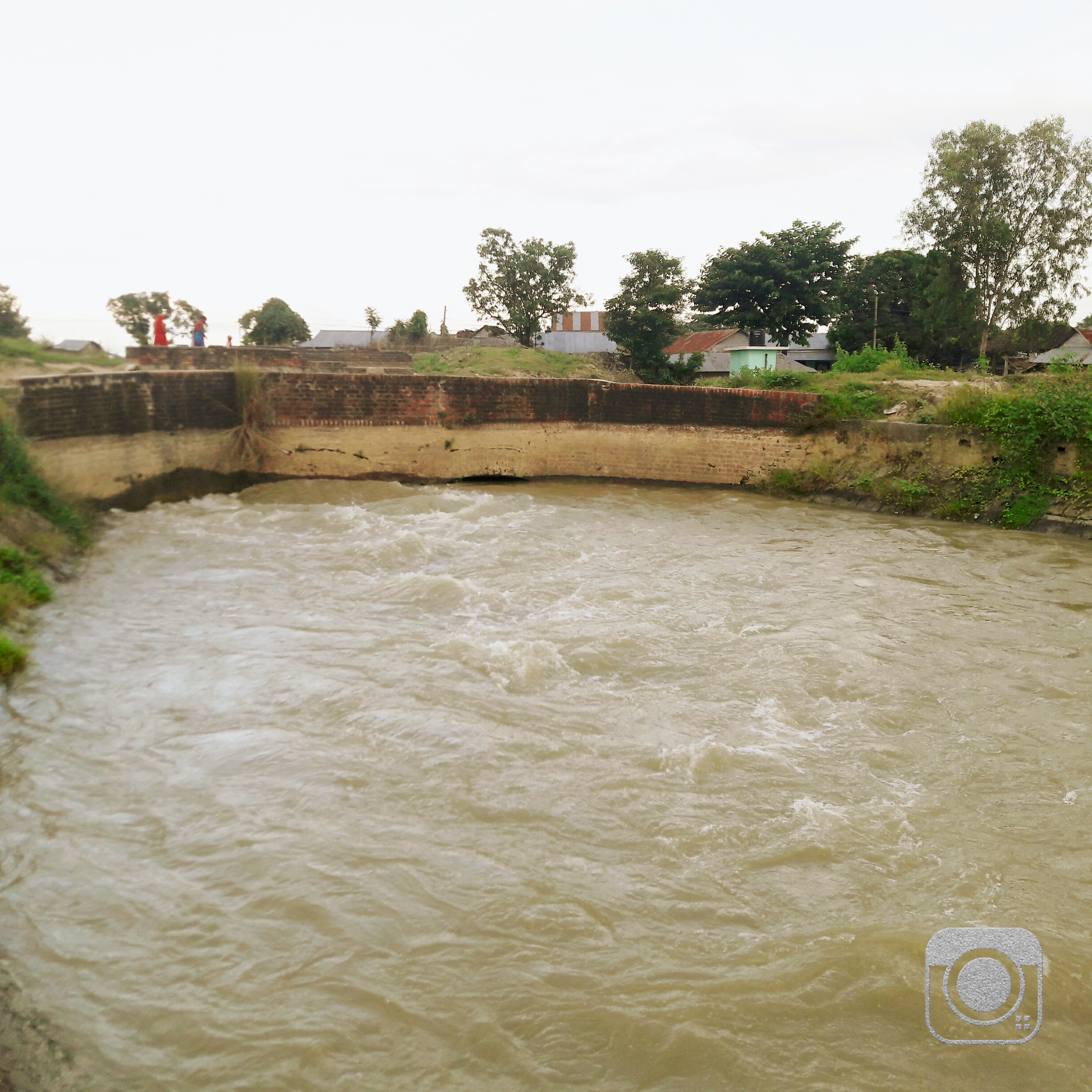
Chandra Canal Siphon near Bhagni Chowk, Saptakoshi

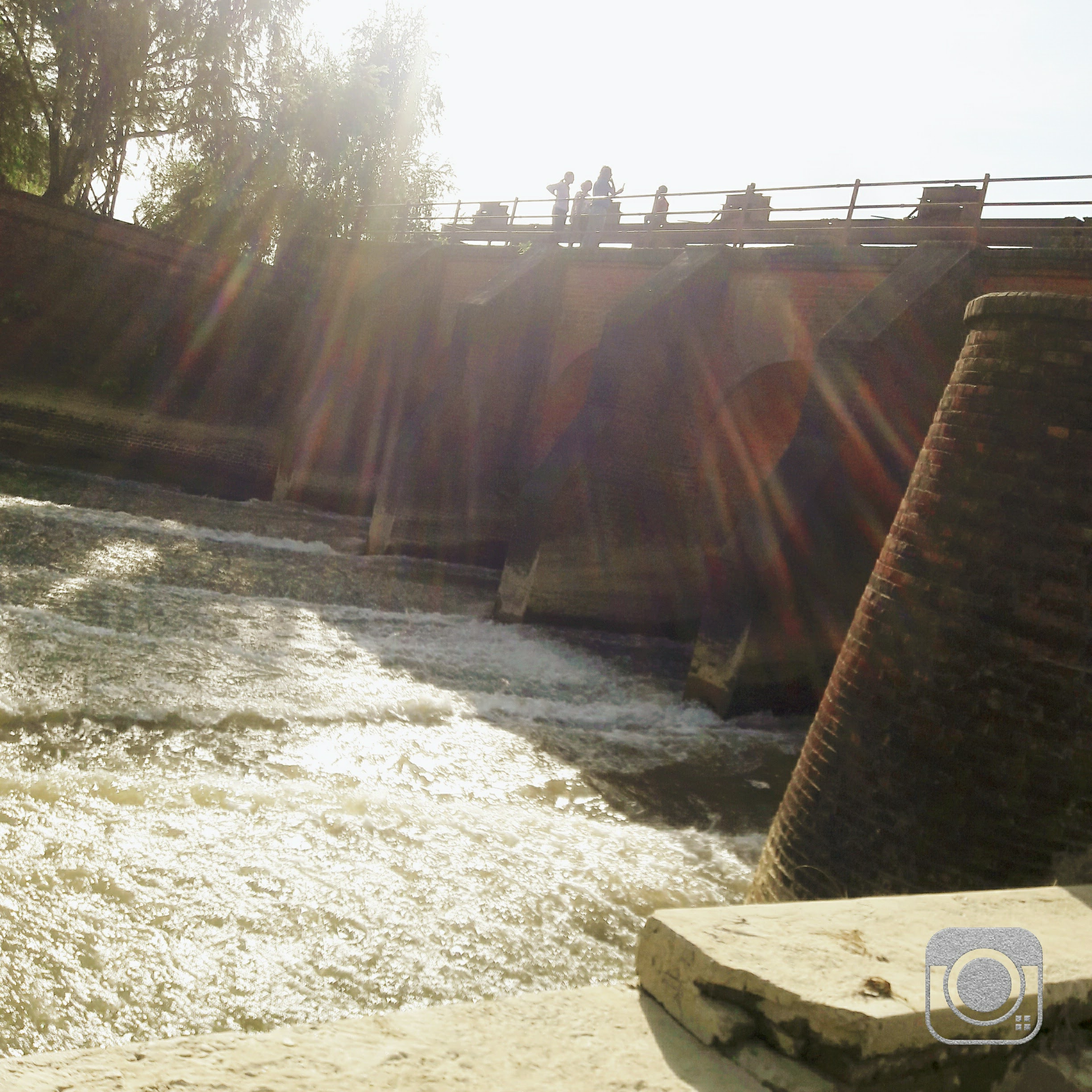
Chandra Canal Main Dam

== See also ==
- Department of Water Resources and Irrigation
