= Birendra Bahadur Basnet =

Nepalese businessman and politician

- Known for: Chairperson of Buddha Air
- Political party: Gatishil Loktantrik Party

Birendra Bahadur Basnet is a Nepalese businessman and politician. He was the chairperson of Buddha Air, until he formed the Gatishil Loktantrik Party ("Dynamic Democratic Party") in 2025 in the aftermath of 2025 Nepalese Gen Z protests as an alternative political force.
