= Satyabrata Rout =

Indian director and scenographer and theatre academic

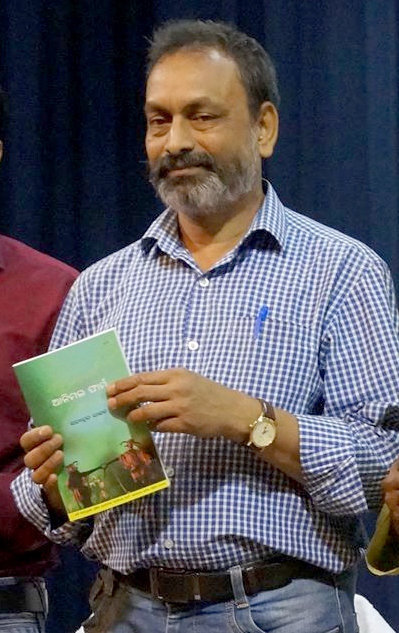
- Born: 17 March 1958 (age 68); Odisha, India
- Education: National School of Drama
- Occupation: Theatre director

Satyabrata Rout (born 17 March 1958) is an Indian theatre director, scenographer, author and theatre academic. He is a former faculty member of the National School of Drama. At present, he is a professor and head of the Department of Theatre at University of Hyderabad, India. He is known for his contribution toward Visual theatre in India. In 2016 he received the Sangeet Natak Akademi Award for Theatre Direction from the president, Ram Nath Kovind in New Delhi.

== Early life and education ==
He was born in Odisha in 1958 and graduated in Science from Ravenshaw University in 1977 then he went to the National School of Drama (NSD) in 1983, where he did his master's degree in theatre with specialisation in Design and Direction.

He did his PhD on the topic "The Influence of B.V. Karanth on Indian Dramaturgy: A Critical Study" from CCS University, Meerut and D.Litt. from I.K.S.V Khairaghad University on "New Direction Theories".

== Theatre direction ==
- Passa (1988)
- Nagmandal (1993)
- Urubhangam (1994)
- Baji (1998)
- Hayvadan (2002)
- Rashomon (2005)
- Pygmalion (2007)
- 30 days in September (2008)
- Evam Indrajit (2010)
- Matte Eklavya (Waiting for Godot) (2011)
- Mrig Trishna (2012)
- Animal Farm (2013)
- Tumhara Vincent (2015)
- Reth (2016)
- Shakuntala (2019)
- Naagmandal (2023)

== Awards ==
- Mahindra Excellence in Theatre Award in 2013 for 'Matte Ekalavya’ (Ekalavya once again).
- Sahitya Kala Parishad Award in 2015 for play ‘Tumhara Vincent’ by best manuscript award.
- Manohar Singh Smriti Puraskar for his contributions to the field of theatre.
- Sangeet Natak Akademi Award in 2016 for the field of Theatre Direction.
- B.V.Karanth Memorial Award in 2019 by National School of Drama
