= Nibuwatar =

Nibuwatar निवुवाटार
- Village development committee
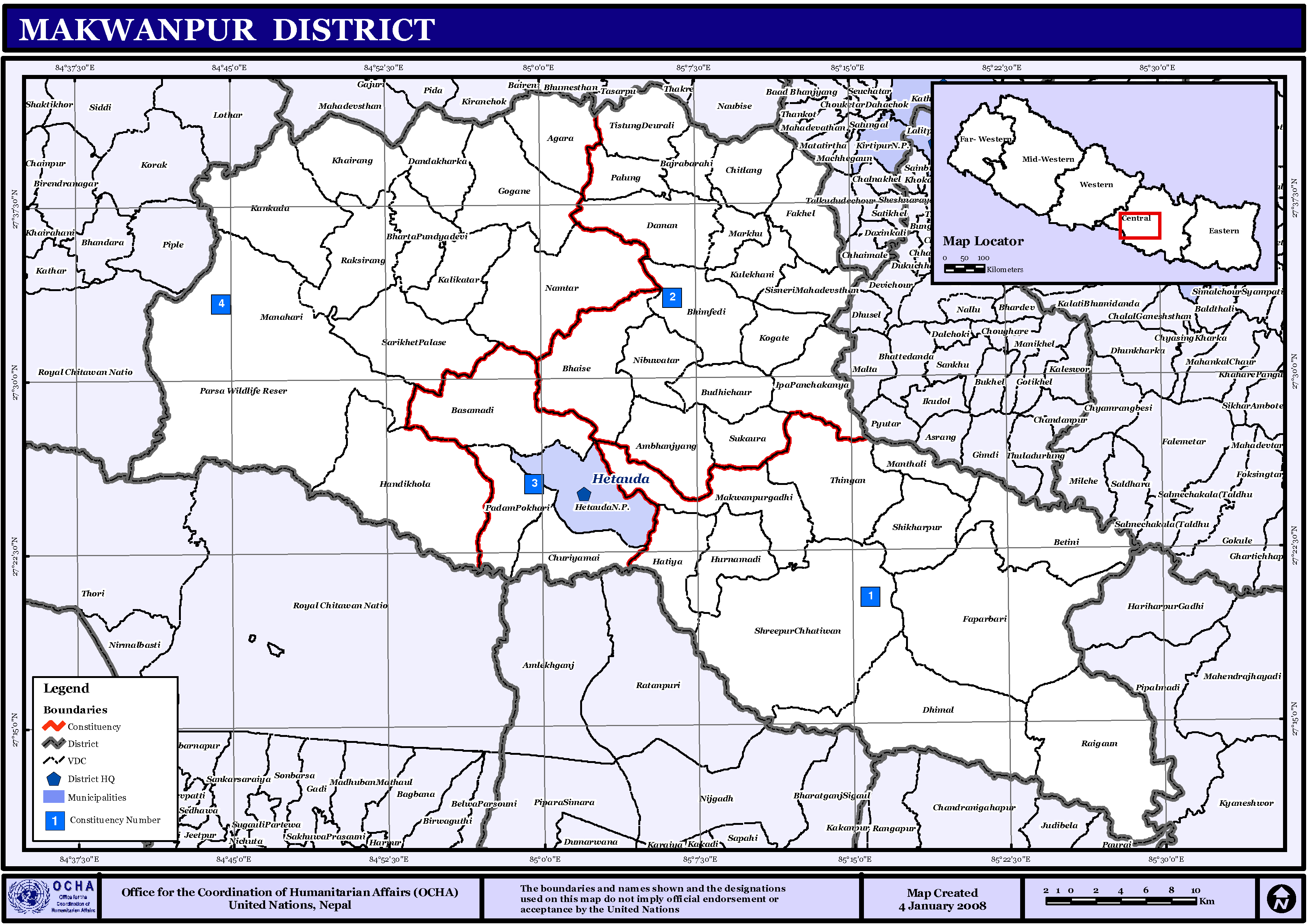
- Map of the village development committees in Makwanpur District
- Country: Nepal
- Province: Bagmati Province
- District: Makwanpur District
- Rural municipality: Bhimphedi Rural Municipality

Population (1991)
  - Total: 3,666
- Time zone: UTC+5:45 (Nepal Time)

Nibuwatar is a village development committee in the Bhimphedi Rural Municipality of Makwanpur District in the Bagmati Province of southern Nepal. At the time of the 1991 Nepal census, it had a population of 3,666.

== Facilities ==
Nibuwatar is surrounded by hills and it lies between Bhinse and Bhimphedi. There are more than 10 schools in Nibuwatar including one secondary school. It is in Nibuwatar-9, kulekhani second and third hydro electricity offices are also in Nibuwatar.

== Sport ==
Nibta club is a very famous sport club in Makawanpur.
