= Dilli Jung Thapa =

Chief engineer and colonel of Nepalese Army

Colonel, Kaji Dilli Jung Thapa
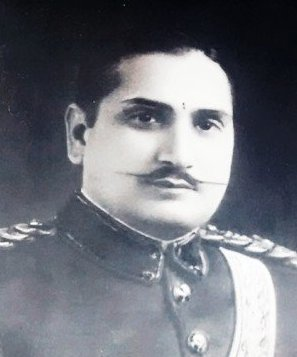
- Born: 1894
- Died: 1946
- Education: Engineering from Thomason College of Civil Engineering (IIT Roorkee)
- Parent: Harka Jung Thapa (Father)
- Engineering career
- Employer: Nepalese Army
- Projects: Churia tunnel, Chandra canal, Kathmandu-Hetauda Ropeway
- Significant design: Urban planning of Rajbiraj

Dilli Jung Thapa (1894–1946) was a chief engineer and colonel of Nepalese Army. He was the son of colonel Harka Jung Thapa and grandson of governor (Badahakim) of eastern Nepal colonel Gajraj Singh Thapa, he was the chief designer of Nepal's first highway tunnel carved through the inner terai between Hetauda and Amlekhganj.

== Notable works ==
He gained his engineering degree from then Thomason College of Civil Engineering, Roorkee, British India. He was the pioneer engineer during the Rana regime. He is also known for reconstruction of the damaged Rana Durbars, Chandra irrigation canal in Saptari district, urban planning of Rajbiraj city based on replica of Jaipur, India, Nepal first ropeway cargo between Kathmandu and Hetauda and Charkhal adda.
