= Churia Tunnel =

Highway tunnel through the Churia hill between Makwanpur and Bara districts of Nepal

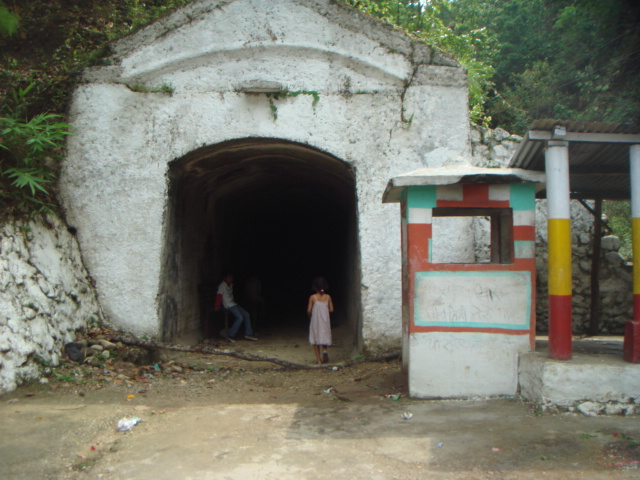
- Churia Tunnel entrance
- Interactive map of Churia Tunnel

Overview
- Location: Hetauda, Nepal
- Coordinates: 27°21′28″N 84°59′57″E
- Status: not in use

Operation
- Constructed: 1917 (109 years ago)

Technical
- Design engineer: Dilli Jung Thapa
- Length: 500 m (1,600 ft)

The Churia Tunnel (Nepali: चुरिया सुरुङ्ग) is a 500 m (1,600 ft)-long highway tunnel carved through the churia hill between Makwanpur and Bara of Nepal. It was constructed connecting the country's first motorable road between Amlekhganj in the terai and Bhimphedi settlement of Makwanpur, the point of entry into Kathmandu which served as a dry port, in the trade route between Kathmandu and Raxaul.

It was the country's first highway tunnel. Constructed in 1917 to reduce the travel time between the Indian border and Bhimphedi it has since fallen into disrepair. The entrance lies at the premises of the Churia (Churiya) Temple off Mahendra Highway in the outskirts of Hetauda, and efforts are ongoing to conserve the remaining structure.

== History ==
The 13th Prime Minister of Nepal Chandra Shumsher Jang Bahadur Rana assigned Dilli Jung Thapa, the country's first civil engineering graduate, as project chief to construct the tunnel. The tunnel was originally constructed to reduce travel time for horse-drawn carriages and lorries traversing the distance between the Indian border and Bhimphedi. The cost to construct the tunnel is not clear; according to historians the unspent budget allocation was returned to the treasury.

The tunnel has not been in use since construction of the "Pathlaiya-Hetauda road" (connecting Pathlaiya and Hetauda), and is presently unusable due to "decades of disuse and lack of maintenance". The city of Hetauda is working to conserve the tunnel, with efforts led by the Churia Mai Temple and Tunnel Conservation Committee. The chair of the committee, Prem Bomjan, while talking about the restoration, said: "The tunnel has been in a sorry state for a long time. People were concerned that a landslide might obliterate the whole structure if immediate steps are not taken towards its conservation". The Churia Tunnel was declared a site of historical importance by Hetauda Municipality. Future plans include erecting a statue of architect Dilli Jung Thapa near the site.

The Nepalese Army blocked the tunnel during the Maoist insurgency in Nepal. Some parts of the tunnel collapsed during the April 2015 Nepal earthquake, but the tunnel entrance is still intact. Dilli Jung Thapa's grandson Janak Jung Thapa, while talking about the current status of Nepal, said: "If only Nepal's planners had seen the potential and built more tunnels like this one, the country would have seen much more rapid development".

== See also ==
- List of roads in Nepal
