= Raut =

Raut may refer to:

== Places ==
- Raut (mountain), a mountain in the Italian Alps
- Raut, old name of Ronchi Valsugana, a town in Italy
- Răut, river in Moldova

== Social groups ==
- Raut (caste), an Indian caste
- Raute people, of Nepal
- A Rawat title used by the Rajdhoves caste in Nepal

== People with the surname ==
- Abhishek Raut (born 1987), Indian cricketer
- Astha Raut, Nepali singer
- C. K. Raut, Nepal-born US-based computer scientist, author and film-director
- Chandrakant Raut (born 1945), Indian cricketer
- Harish Raut (1925–2002), Indian artist
- Kavita Raut (born 1985), Indian long-distance runner from Maharashtra
- Lopamudra Raut
- Mayadhar Raut (1930–2025), Indian Odissi dancer and choreographer
- Nitin Raut, Indian politician from Maharashtra belonging to the Indian National Congress party
- Onkar Raut (born 1990), Indian actor
- Poonam Raut (born 1989), Indian cricketer
- Sachidananda Raut Ray (1916–2004), Indian Oriya-language poet
- Sanjay Raut (born 1961), Indian politician from Maharashtra, belonging to the Shiv Sena party
- Ujjwala Raut (born 1978), Indian model

== Other uses ==
- Raut (knife), a Sumatran (Batak) knife; see Pencak silat § Batak
- Raut Nacha, an Indian dance

== See also ==
- Rout (surname), an Indian surname
- Rawat (disambiguation)
