= Airee =

Airee or Airy or Airi (Nepali: ऐरी) is a Chhetri and Pahadi Rajput surname found in Nepal and Uttarakhand, India. Notable people with the surname include:

- Dipendra Singh Airee (born 2001), Nepalese cricketer
- Kamal Singh Airee (born 2000), Nepalese cricketer
- Kashi Singh Airy, Indian Kumaoni politician
- Pradeep Singh Airee (born 1992), Nepalese cricketer
