= Bhainse, Makwanpur =

Bhainse भैंसे
- Village development committee
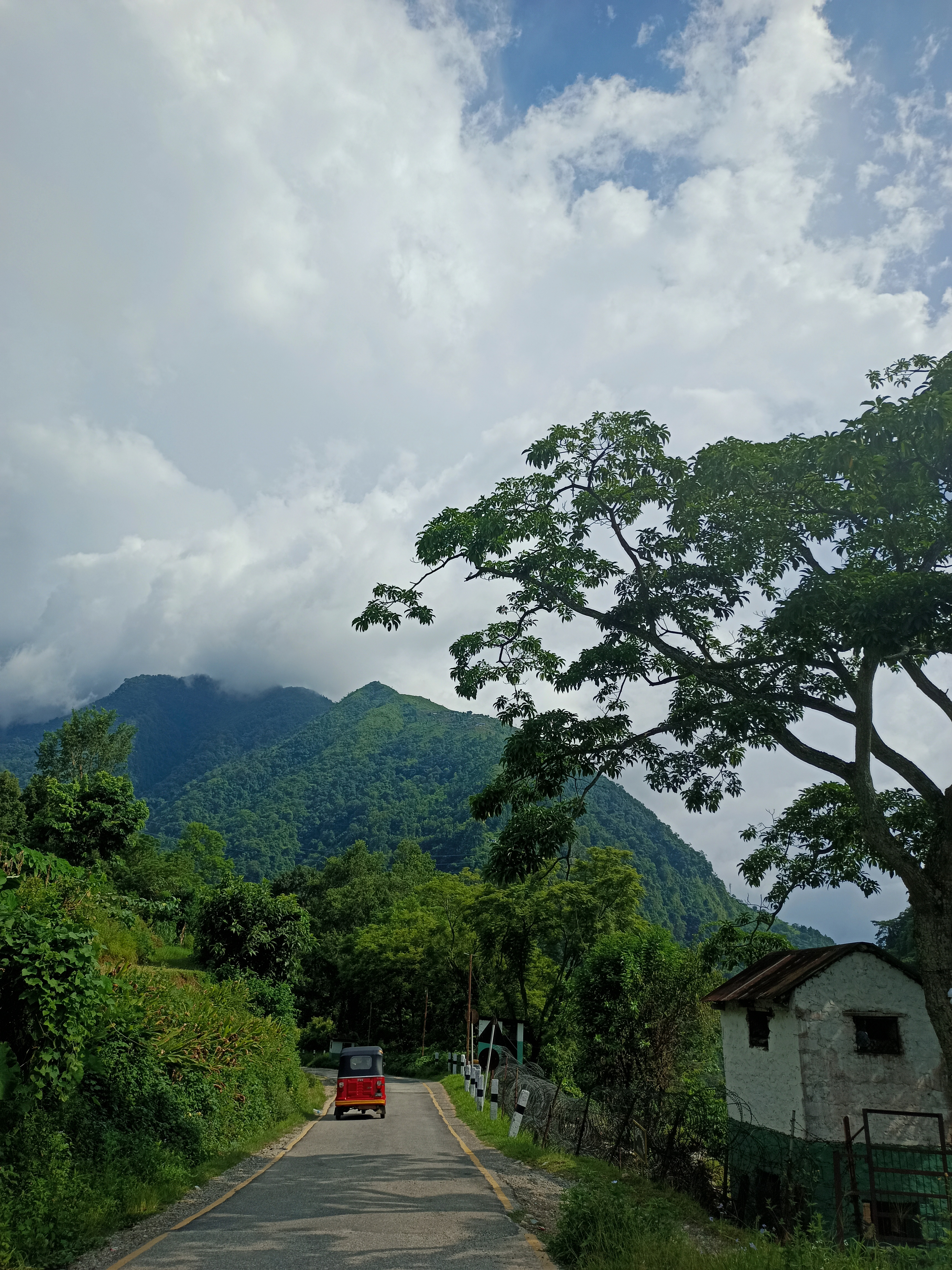
- Bhainse

- Location in Nepal
- Coordinates: 27.51°N 85.03°E
- Country: Nepal
- Province: Bagmati Province
- District: Makwanpur District
- Rural municipality: Bhimphedi Rural Municipality

Population (1991)
  - Total: 6,615
- Time zone: UTC+5:45 (Nepal Time)

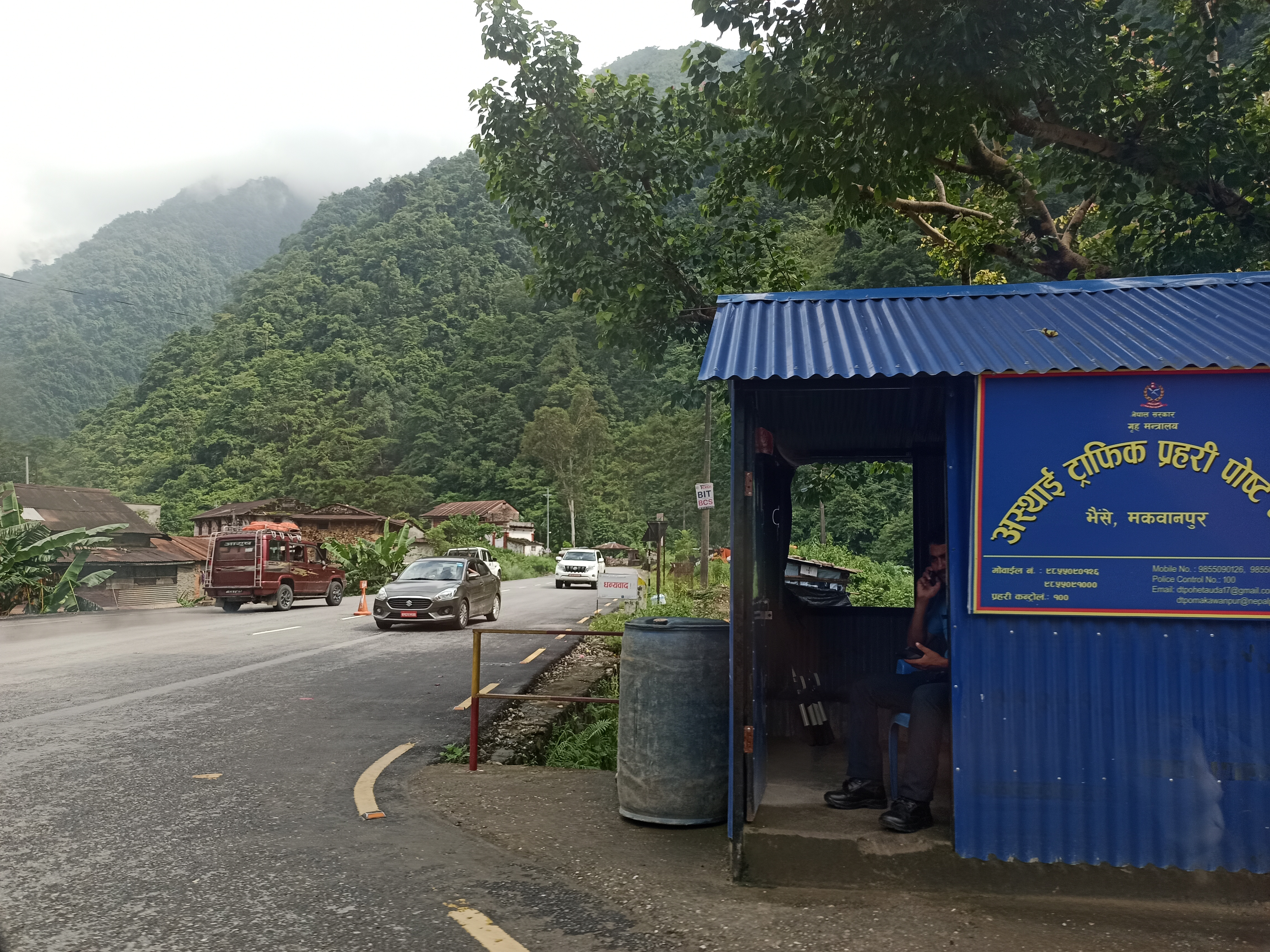
Bhainse Police Check Post

Bhainse is a village development committee in the Bhimphedi Rural Municipality of Makwanpur District in the Bagmati Province of southern Nepal. At the time of the 1991 Nepal census it had a population of 6,615 people living in 1,105 individual households.
