= Dipak Karki =

Dipak Karki may refer to the following people:

- Dipak Karki (Jhapa politician)
- Dipak Karki (Dhanusha politician)
