= Kogate =

Kogate कोगटे
- Village development committee
- Location in Nepal
- Coordinates: 27.53°N 85.19°E
- Country: Nepal
- Province: Bagmati Province
- District: Makwanpur District
- Rural municipality: Bhimphedi Rural Municipality

Population (1991)
  - Total: 1,429
- Time zone: UTC+5:45 (Nepal Time)

Kogate is a village development committee in the Bhimphedi Rural Municipality of Makwanpur District in the Bagmati Province of southern Nepal. At the time of the 1991 Nepal census it had a population of 1,429.
