= Kanwar Sanctuary =

Wildlife sanctuary in Parbati Valley, India

Coordinates: 30.970°N 77.196°E

- IUCN category IV (habitat/species management area)
- Interactive map of Kanwar Sanctuary
- Location: Kullu district, Himachal Pradesh, India
- Area: 107.29 km^{2} (41.42 sq mi)
- Established: 1954

The Kanwar Sanctuary is located in Parbati valley of Kullu district. R.O. wildlife Kasol provides information and help to visitors. Uphill walk along Garahan Nala from Kasol through dense Deodar and Fir forests is worth. The sanctuary has large population of Himalayan Tahr.

== Access ==
- Airport:- Bhuntar (10-km from Kullu)
- Railway:- The closest Railhead is at Jogindernagar (95 km from Kullu)
- Road:- The sanctuary is well connected by road.
- Delhi via Mandi:- 530 km
- Shimla:- 240 km

== Fauna ==
- Mammals:- Blue sheep (Bharal), Musk deer, Serow, Goral, Himalayan tahr, Snow leopard, Himalayan black bear, Himalayan brown bear, Himalayan red fox, Jackals, and Civets.
- Birds -Black Kite, Ring-necked Parakeet, Common Hoopoe, Yellow-billed Blue Magpie, Verditer Flycatcher, Long-tailed Minivet, and various Thrushes, Tits, and Warblers.
