= Ranbir Singh Bisht =

Indian painter (1928–1998)

- Born: 1928; Lansdowne, Uttarakhand, India
- Died: 1998 (aged 69–70); Lucknow, Uttar Pradesh, India
- Occupation: Painter
- Spouse: Vimala Bisht
- Children: Three daughters One Son
- Awards: Padma Shri; Lalit Kala Akademi Fellowship; UP Lalit Kala Akademi Fellowship

Ranbir Singh Bisht (1928–1998) was an Indian painter and the Principal of the College of Fine Arts, Lucknow University. Born in 1928 at Landsdowne in Garhwal, in the present day Indian state of Uttarakhand, he secured Drawing Teacher's Training Certificate and Diploma in Fine Arts from the Government College of Art and Craft, Lucknow. He conducted many solo shows in a number of Indian cities besides a show in New York and participated in group shows in Frankfurt and Tokyo. He was also a participant of the 4th Triennale at New Delhi in 1972.

Lalit Kala Akademi awarded him their fellowship in 1987. He was also fellow of the UP State Lalit Kala Akademi (184) and UNESCO. The Government of India awarded him the fourth highest civilian award of the Padma Shri, in 1991. Bisht, who was the vice president of the Uttar Pradesh State Lalit Kala Akademi, died in 1998, aged 70. He was married to Vimala, a ceramic and terracotta artist and the couple had three daughters and one son.

== Participations ==
R. B. Bisht had participated in many national and international art exhibitions and events. Some of the major events are

- Miniature 70, International Galleries, Frankfurt, W. Germany (1970)
- Contemporary Indian Painting, National Museum of Modern Arts, Tokyo, Japan (1970)
- 11th Sao-Paulo Biennale, Brazil (1971)
- 4th Triennale – International, India (1972)
- Third Asian Art Show, Fukuoka, Japan (1989)

== Awards ==
- Received the PadmaShri award from the President of India in the year 1991.
- Kala Ratan, AIFACS, New Delhi (1991)
- Fellow of National Lalit Kala Akademi(1988)
- Fellow of U.P. State Lalit Kala Akademi(1984)
- UNESCO Fellowship for Visual Arts (1967–68)
- National Exhibition Award (1965)
