= Kanwarpura =

Kanwarpura is a village of Katewas found in the Chirawa tehsil of Jhunjhunu, Rajasthan.
