= Kanwarpur-Sultanpur =

Coordinates: 26°8′33.92″N 82°16′23.76″E

Kanwarpur (Village ID 170631) is a village in Sultanpur District. According to the 2011 census it has a population of 546 living in 76 households.
