= Mahara (surname) =

Mahara or Mahra (महरा) is a surname in Uttarakhand, India, and in Nepal.

== Notable people ==
Notable people with the surname include:

- Kalu Singh Mahara, Indian Kumaoni freedom fighter
- Krishna Bahadur Mahara (born 1958), Nepalese politician and minister
- Karan Mahara (born 1972), Indian politician
- Mahendra Singh Mahra, Indian politician and MP of Rajya Sabha for Uttarakhand
- Ummed Singh Mahra (21 January 1942 – 6 July 1971), Indian Kumaoni posthumous recipient of the Ashoka Chakra
