= Parshuram Basnet =

Nepalese politician

Personal details
- Party: CPN(UML)

Parshuram Basnet (Nepali: पर्शुराम बस्नेत) is a notorious don from Biratnagar, Secretary of YAN and Morang district Chairman of Youth Force, both youth wings of CPN UML.

In 2011, he was charged with criminal offense when his gang attacked over Biratnagar Nagarik Daily correspondent Khilanath Dhakal on June 5 and notorious prisoner Abhisek Giri and police team at Morang District Court premises on August 14. On the event, he was publicly supported by fellow YAN leader and CPN UML politician Mahesh Basnet. Afterwards in April 2012, he surrendered himself to Morang District Court and also YAN cadres Rohit Koirala and Manoj Rai were detained by police. In 2013, he was jailed against the charges of money laundering and acquiring property through illegal means. In July 2013, he was released after depositing bail amounting to Rs. 20 million. In January 2016, he was yet again involved in a conflict at Rangeli, Morang where party cadres from UDMF collided with Youth Force cadres.
