= Narendra Kanwar =

Indian politician (born 1948)

State Minister Government of Rajasthan
- In office 13 December 1993 – 30 November 1998
- Ministry and departments: Information and Public Relations; Art, Culture and Archeology; Tourism; Women and Child Welfare

Member of the Rajasthan Legislative Assembly
- In office 1993–1998
- Preceded by: Moti Lal Meena
- Succeeded by: Yasmin Abrar

Personal details
- Born: 13 August 1948 (age 78) Jodhpur, Rajasthan, India
- Party: Independent
- Spouse: Shiv Prakash Singh
- Children: 3
- Occupation: Agriculturist and Politician
- As of 5 April 2025

Narendra Kanwar (born 13 August 1948) is an Indian politician who served as a state minister in Government of Rajasthan from 1993 to 1998 under Bhairon Singh ministry. She was elected to the Rajasthan Legislative Assembly from Sawai Madhopur in 1993 as an independent candidate.
