= Madhur Basnet =

Nepalese cinematographer (born 1990)

Madhur Basnet मधुर बस्नेत
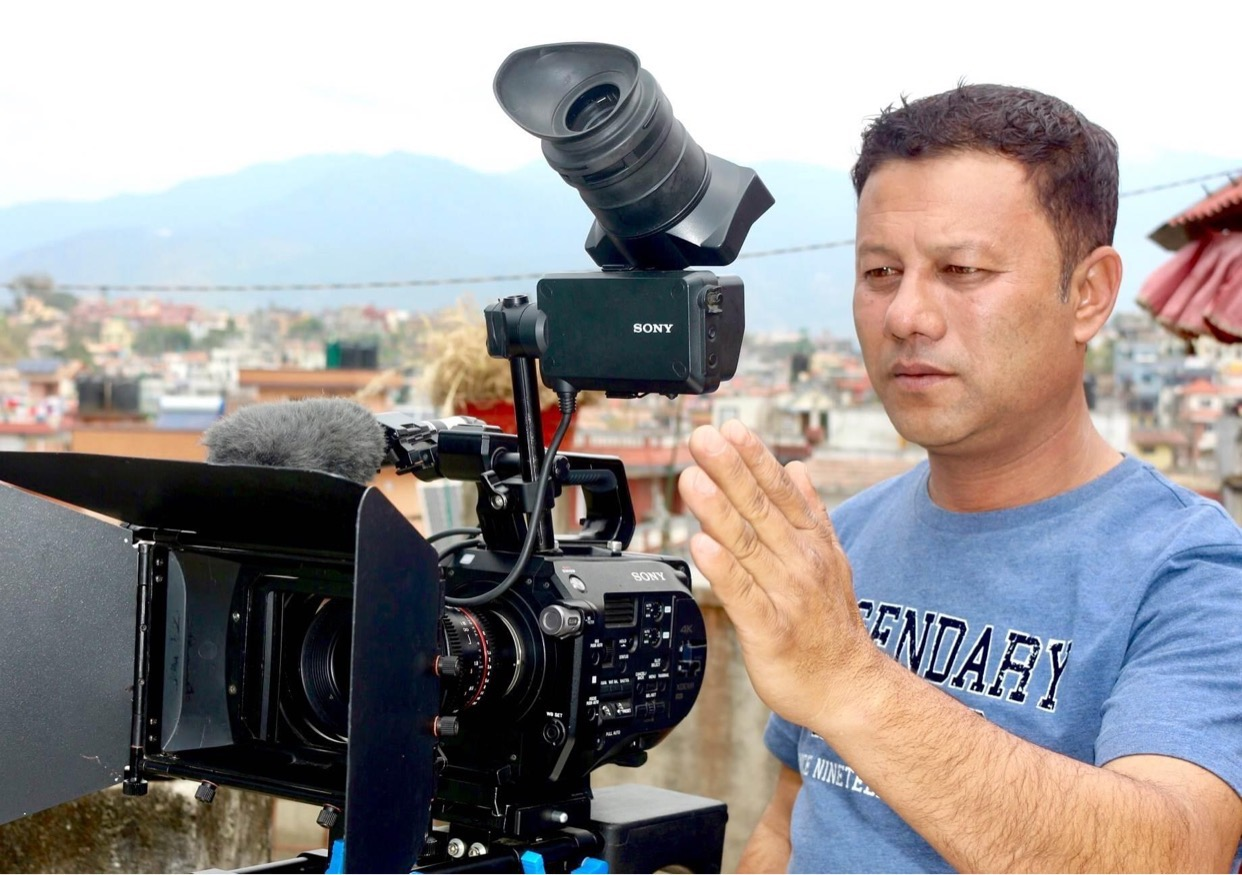
- Basnet shooting a Nepali music video

Background information
- Born: 29 February 1972 (age 54); Nepal
- Origin: Nepali
- Occupation: Cinematographer
- Website: https://www.madhurbasnet.com

Madhur Basnet (Nepali: मधुर बस्नेत) is a cinematographer in Nepal. He is widely recognized as the first to introduce cinematography to Nepali music videos, and has shot more than 3000 music videos, documentaries and movies.

== About ==
Basnet has been honored with several awards in Nepal, including the Tele Award, Bindabasini Music Award, National Capital Award, and Sagarmatha Music Award.

He served as a judge in the 1st, 2nd, and 3rd Lok Dohori Awards organized by the National Folk and Dohori Song Foundation Valley Coordination Committee, as well as in various other awards and reality shows.
