= Gajraj Singh Thapa =

Badahakim (governor) of Ilam, Nepal

Colonel, Bada Hakim, Kaji Gajraj Singh Thapa
- गजराज सिंह थापा
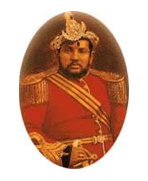
- Born: c. 1830
- Notable work: Established first tea plantation estate in Nepal
- Spouse: Maharajkumari Badan Kumari Rana
- Children: 4 daughters, 1 son (Colonel Harka Jung Thapa)
- Parent: Hemdal Singh Thapa

Colonel Gajraj Singh Thapa (Nepali: गजराज सिंह थापा) was the first person to establish tea plantation estates in Nepal. Around 1873, Thapa, son-in-law of Prime Minister Jung Bahadur Rana, was on a tour of Darjeeling. He was impressed by the sight of the young tea plants and the taste of the drink he was offered everywhere he went. Upon his return to Nepal, he set up two plantations – the Ilam and Soktim tea estates, 103 acres (42 ha) each – and so began Nepal's tea industry. Colonel Thapa was then the Governor General (Bada Hakim) of the eastern region of Nepal. Translation of various signposts placed in Ilam (shown below), reads that the very first tea saplings planted by Thapa was received as a gift from the Government of China, it was gifted to his father-in-law prime minister Jung Bahadur Rana. According to the signpost the genus of tea planted in the estate were Camellia sinensis/Camellia Assamica/Camellia assamica sub sp Lasiocalyx or cambodensis.

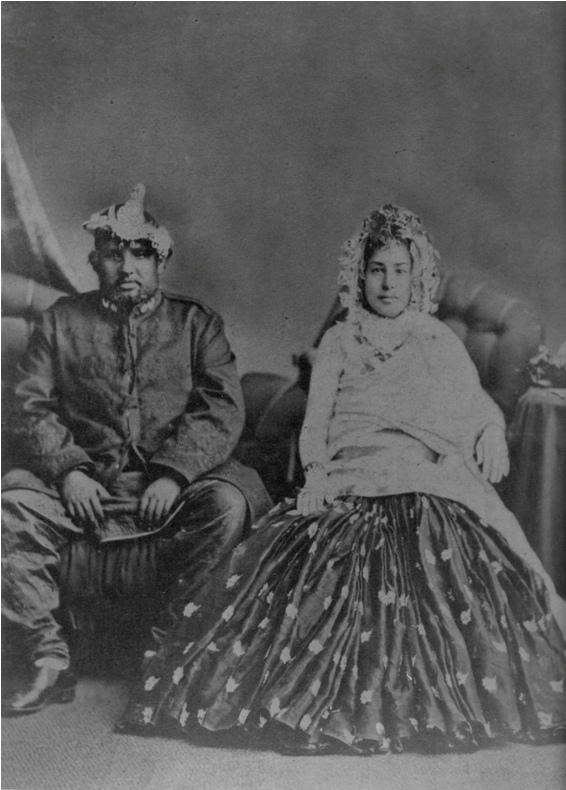
Gajraj Singh Thapa and his wife (eldest daughter of Jung Bahadur Rana)

== Personal life ==
Thapa was born c. 1830 to Hemdal Singh Thapa. In 1860, he married Maharajkumari Badan Kumari Rana of Kaski and Lamjung, the eldest child of Sri Teen Jung Bahadur Rana. They had one son and four daughters. The son was Colonel Harka Jung Thapa and his grandson was the famous Engineer Dilli Jung Thapa.

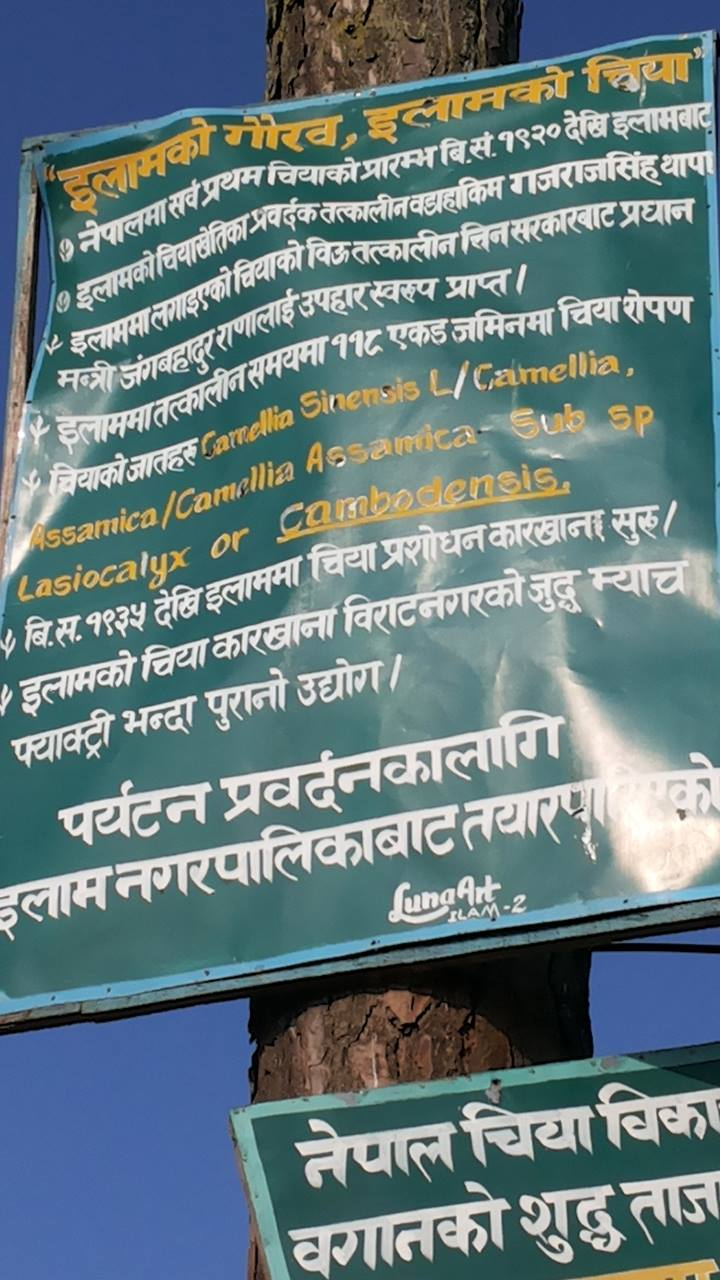
Another signpost next to a tea estate in Ilam, Nepal acknowledging Gajraj Singh Thapa's contribution in starting the tea plantation.

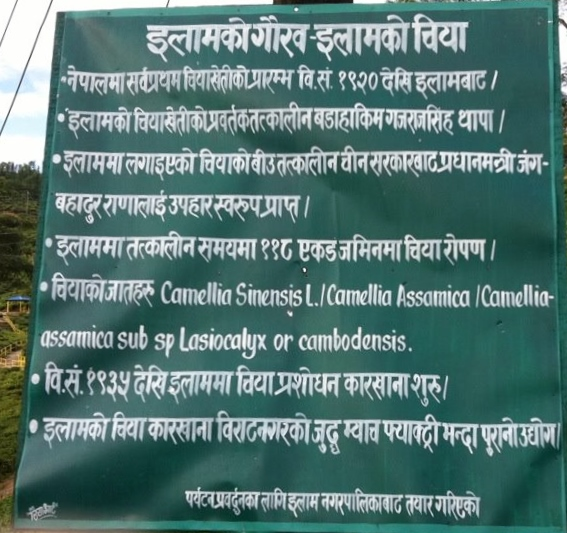
Signpost in Ilam Tea Estate acknowledging the contribution of Gajraj Singh Thapa in starting Nepal's very first tea plantation

== Titles ==
- Colonel of the Nepal Army
- Governor General (Bada Hakim, बडा हाकिम) of Eastern Nepal.
