= Basnet =

- Language: Nepali, Doteli, Kumaoni, Garhwali

Origin
- Languages: Nepali, Hindi
- Origin: Karnali, Nepal
- Meaning: Warrior

Other names
- Variant forms: Basnyat, Basnet

Basnet/Basnyat (Nepali: बस्‍नेत/बस्न्यात) is a surname of Khasas of Nepal and India. It is commonly found among the Jharra Chhetri caste.

Notable people with the name include:

- Abhiman Singh Basnet (1744–1800), Nepalese general
- Ambika Basnet, Nepalese politician
- Anita Basnet (born 1994), Nepalese footballer
- Arjun Kumar Basnet (born 1975), Nepalese marathon runner
- Basanta Basnet, Nepali journalist and writer
- Biren Basnet (born 1994), Bhutanese footballer
- Birendra Bahadur Basnet, Nepalese businessman and politician
- Bishal Basnet (born 2002), Nepalese footballer
- Gita Basnet, Nepalese politician
- Gopal Kumar Basnet, Nepali politician
- Gyanu Basnet, Nepalese politician
- Hari Bahadur Basnet, Nepalese politician
- Khare Basnet (born 1956), Bhutanese footballer and manager
- Krishna Bahadur Basnet (born 1959), Nepalese long-distance runner
- Kumar Basnet (born 1938), Nepalese folk singer
- Lal Bahadur Basnet (1926–1998), Indian politician
- Madhab Basnet, Nepalese journalist
- Madhur Basnet (born 1990), Nepalese cinematographer
- Mahesh Basnet (born 1975), Nepalese Communist politician
- Mahesh Basnet (born 1960), Nepali politician
- Mohan Bahadur Basnet (born 1958), Nepalese politician
- Nischal Basnet, Nepalese film director and actor
- Parshuram Basnet, Nepalese politician
- Pushpa Basnet (born 1984), Nepali social worker
- Raju Basnet (born 1969), Indian MLA from Sikkim
- Salon Basnet (born 1991), Nepali actor
- Shakti Bahadur Basnet (born 1969), Nepalese politician
- Sujita Basnet (born 1993), American model
- Tanka Basnet (born 1990), Nepalese footballer
- Tek Bahadur Basnet, Nepali politician
