= Dharmaraj Thapa =

Janakavi Keshari Dharmaraj Thapa जनकवि केशरी धर्मराज थापा
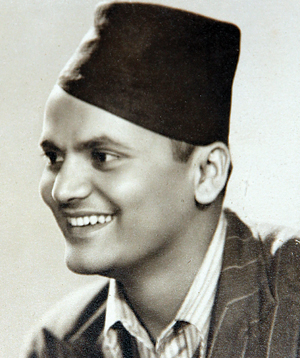
- Dharmaraj Thapa during young age

Background information
- Born: 15July 1924 Batulechour-16, Pokhara, Nepal
- Origin: Pokhara, Nepal
- Died: 14 October 2014
- Genre: Nepali Original Folk
- Occupations: Vocalist, poet

Janakavi Keshari Dharmaraj Thapa (जनकवि केशरी धर्मराज थापा) (1924 - 14 October 2014 ) was one of the most significant Nepali folk singers. He is most famous for his songs "Hariyo Danda Maathi (हरियो डाँडा माथि हह माले हह )", "Nepali le Maya Maaryo Barilai (नेपालीले माया मार्यो वरिलै)". Dharmaraj Thapa started singing hymns, folk songs including dancing acts from his early childhood. He was married to 13yrs old Shavitri at the age of 15 on 28th Baisakh, 1996 B.S. He is also honoured as lifetime member at the Nepal Academy.

== Songs ==
Some of the notable songs collected and sung by Dharmaraj Thapa are

1. Hariyo Danda Maathi (हरियो डाँडा माथि)
2. Nepali Le Maya Maaryo Barilai (नेपालीले माया मार्यो वरिलै)
3. Suna Mero Nirmaya (सुन मेरो निरमाया)
4. Saahili Rimai (साँहिली रिमै चौरी गाई, झर्यो रिमै मधु बनैमा)
5. Aaja Malai Sancho Chaina (आज मलाई सञ्चो छैन)
6. Aaipugyau Relaima (आईपुग्यौ रेलैमा, नौबजे बेलैमा .. देहरादुनैमा साथी देहरादुनैमा)

== Books ==
Dharmaraj wrote the following books:

1. Lamichane Thapa ko Vamshavali ("Genealogy of the Lamichhane Thapa")
2. Nala Damayanti
3. Loka Sanskriti ko Ghera ma Kam jung
4. Mukti natha Darshana

== Awards ==
Including the title "Janakabi Keshari", Dharmaraj Thapa has been awarded with several prestigious awards.

Year	Title	Awarded By	Description
2025 B.S.	Indrarajyalaxmi Purashkar	Nepal Rajakiya Pragya Pratisthan	
2025 B.S.	Madan Purashkar	Madan Purashkar Guthi	Awarded for his GitiKavya 'Mangali Kusum' (मंगली कुसुम)
2026 B.S.	Nominated for Committee Member (सह सदस्य)	Nepal Academy (former Royal Nepal Academy)	
2042 B.S	Lok Sahitya Purashkar	Sajha Prakashan	
2048 B.S.	Chinnalata Geet Purashkar	Chinnalata Geet Purashkar Guthi	
2054 B.S.	Life Time Achievement Award	Hits FM	Annual Hits FM 100 Music Awards 2054
-	Life Time Achievement Award	Kantipur FM	
-	Life Time Achievement Award	Image FM	Annual Image Award
-	SAARC Poetry Symposium	The Silver Jubilee of His Majesty King Birendra Bir Bikram Shah Dev's Accession Civic Main Committee	
2057 B.S.	Nepal Samman	Nepal Sanskritik Parishad	
2060 B.S.	Harati Samman	-	
2061 B.S.	Nepal Lok Sangeetbhushan	Kalanidhi Indira Sangeet Mahavidhyalaya	
2061/03/29 B.S.	Aadikavi Bhanubhakta Purashkar	Nepali Sikchya Parishad	
2061/03/30 B.S.	Nagarik Samman 2062	Nepal Yuwa Samaj	(need to verify the title and date)
2062/06/13 B.S.	Sangeet Sheela Samman 2062	संगीत शिला प्रतिष्ठान नृत्य तथा संगीत विद्यालय	
2063 B.S.	Raajdhani Bisista Samman	Raajdhani Kala Kendra	
