= Jharra Chhetri =

Jharrā
- Classification: Subcaste of Chhetri
- Religions: Hinduism
- Languages: Nepali, Sanskrit
- Country: Nepal, India
- Feudal title: Kaji Sa'ab, Dewan sahib, Mukhtiyar, Chautariya (चौतरिया), Sardar etc. All the titles being different administrative posts.
- Victory weapon: Khukuri
- Notable members: Basnyat family, Kunwar family, Pande family, Thapa dynasty
- Related groups: Thakuri, Bahun
- Historical grouping: Tagadhari castes
- Reservation (Education): No (Forward Caste)
- Reservation (Employment): No
- Reservation (Other): No
- Kingdom (original): Khasa Kingdom
- Kingdom (other): Gorkha Kingdom, Jumla Kingdom

Jharra Chhetri (/ˈʒərrɑː/) are the tagadhari subgroup of the Chhetri caste of the Khas ethnic group. Jharra Chhetri wear the six threaded Janai (sacred thread). In the socio-religious culture of Nepal, Jharra Chhetris were accorded ritually pure status. This was in contrast to Matwali Chhetris who drank alcohol and did not wear the sacred thread and hence were considered ritually impure.

== Etymology and background ==
"Chhetri" is a direct derivative or a Nepalese vernacular of the Sanskrit word Kshatriya.

Chhetris before the introduction of the first legal code of Nepal (Mukuki Ain) of 1854 were previously referred to as Khas. The legal code, on the order of Nepal's ruler Jung Bahadur Rana, issued 'ilkap' or title to Khas by the introduction of royal decree: 'From here on, all the Tagadhari Khas Jāti has been granted the ilkap of Chhetri jaati. In committing this to writing in documents, one should first write the name of the person, then his thar (clan) after the ilkap of Chhetri."

Chhetris along with Brahmins were considered among the twice born castes called Tagadhari in Nepal and they wear the sacred thread called the Yagnopavita. Chhetris are considered among the Pahadi caste groups and they speak Nepali language as their mother tongue which is highly influenced by Sanskrit.

== Culture and traditions ==
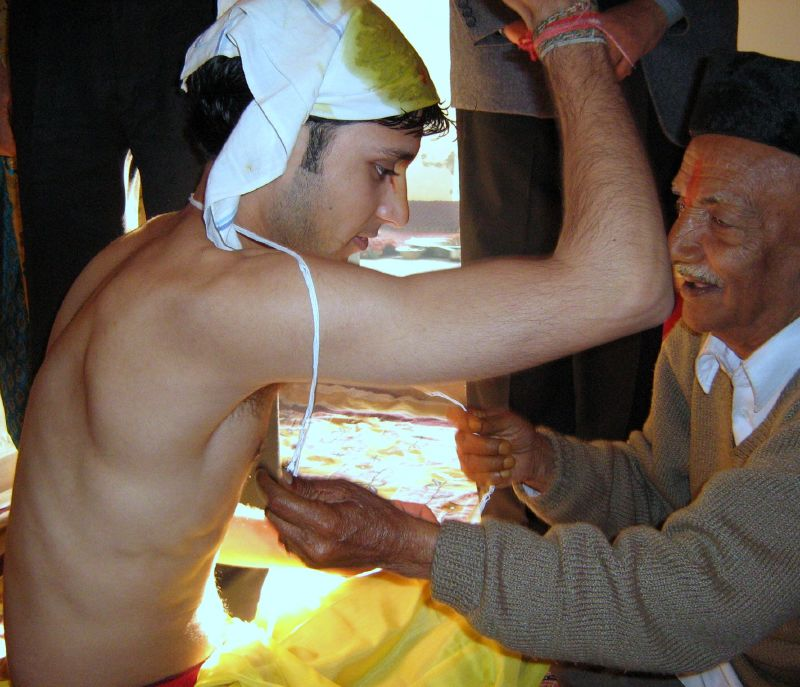
Sacred thread being given to young boys in Himalayas

Traditionally, the children born from the union of a Chhetri man and his Chhetri wife, only accomplished by a proper Brahmā vivāha were considered "Jharrā" (meaning: 'pure'). Along with this, the children of Brahmin fathers and Chhetri mothers, called Khatris, were considered Jharras and equivalent in status to isogamous marriages between Chhetris.

In contrast, the children of a Chhetri father and a Janajati mother (locally refererred to as Bhote) or Chhetri widow/divorcee mother were classified as "Thimā" (meaning: 'hybrid') . A Jharrā boy would be given a six threaded Janai (sacred thread) at his Hindu passage of rite Bartaman ceremony while a Thimā boy would be given only a three threaded Janai (sacred thread). A Thimā son would inherit a sixth of the ancestral property compared to that of the Jharrā son.

=== Notable people ===
- Bhimsen Thapa
- Abhiman Singh Basnet
- Dilli Jung Thapa
- Amar Singh Thapa
- Bhakti Thapa
- Bal Narsingh Kunwar
- Swarup Singh Karki
- Balbhadra Kunwar
- Queen Tripurasundari of Nepal
- Abhiman Singh Basnet
- Mathabarsingh Thapa
- Pyar Jung Thapa
- Purna Chandra Thapa
- Surya Bahadur Thapa
- Rookmangud Katawal
- Yogi Naraharinath

== Books ==
- Adhikary, Surya Mani (1997). The Khasa Kingdom: A trans-Himalayan empire of the middle age. Nirala Publications. p. 210. ISBN 8185693501.
- Bennett, Lynn (1978). "Maiti-Ghar: The Dual Role of High Caste Women". In James F. Fisher (ed.). Himalayan Anthropology: The Indo-Tibetan Interface. Walter de Gruyter. ISBN 978-90-279-7700-7.
- Bista, Dor Bahadur (1 January 1972). People of Nepal. Kathmandu: Ratna Pustak Bhandar.
- Burghart, Richard (1984). "The Formation of the Concept of Nation-State in Nepal". The Journal of Asian Studies. 44 (1): 101–125. doi:10.2307/2056748. JSTOR 2056748.
- Gurung, Harka B. (1996). Faces of Nepal. Himal Books. ISBN 9789993343509.
- Pahari, Anup (1995), The Origins, Growth and Dissolution of Feudalism in Nepal: A Contribution to the Debate on Feudalism in Non-European Societies, vol. 4, University of Wisconsin--Madison
- Sharma Upreti, Nayantara (1979). A Study of the Family Support System: Child Bearing and Child Rearing Rituals in Kathmandu, Nepal. University of Wisconsin--Madison. ISBN 9788173041143.
- Subba, Tanka Bahadur (1989). Dynamics of a hill society: Nepalis in Darjeeling and Sikkim Himalayas. Mittal Publications. ISBN 9788173041143.
- Iijima, Shigeru (1977). Changing Aspects of Modern Nepal: Relating to the Ecology, Agriculture, and Her People. Institute for the Study of Languages and Cultures of Asia and Africa.
