= Mahat (surname) =

Mahat महत
- Language: Nepali

Origin
- Language: Khas language
- Origin: Khasa kingdom
- Meaning: The Great One

Other names
- Derivatives: Mahat Kshatri, Mahat Ekthariya
- See also: Katwal, Budhathoki, Rayamajhi

Mahat (Nepali: महत) is an Ekthariya chhetri surname among Nepalese, of Khasa heritage. The name may have originated when one of the Jumli Malla kings in medieval times made his younger brother, Dharma Malla, chief of staff in the army. This granted Dharma Malla the title of Mahat (Kshatriya) (meaning The Great One), and as a result, his descendants started using 'Mahat' as their surnames.

== Population and distribution ==
At the time of the 1991 Nepal census, there were 4,240 Mahats living in 799 dwellings.

== Notable Mahats ==
- Prem Raja Mahat, Nepalese folk singer
- Gajendra Bahadur Mahat (Jumla), Nepalese politician
- Leyla Mahat, Kazakhstani artist
- Prakash Sharan Mahat (Nuwakot), Finance Minister in Nepal Government
- Ram Sharan Mahat (Nuwakot), Senior Leader of Nepalese Congress, former Finance Minister in Nepal Government (brother of Prakash Sharan Mahat)
