= Rayamajhi =

Surname, Family name

Rayamajhi रायमाझी
- Language: Nepali

Origin
- Origin: Palpa (Nepal)
- Derivation: Raya (King)

Other names
- Cognates: Raya, Majhi,
- Derivatives: Rayamajhi Kshatri, Rayamajhi Ekthariya
- See also: Mahat, Rana, Kunwar, Rajput, Basnet, Malla

Colonel Bahadur Gambhir Singh Rayamajhi from 1857 Indian Rebellion who was conferred the personal title of Bahadur for his bravery displayed in the suppression of rebellion

Rayamajhi (Nepali: रायमाझी) is a Rajput-Chhetri family surname. Rayamajhis belong to Ekthariya (Note: The word Ekthariya is composed of two Nepali words; Ek (one) and thar (clan). Thus, it means one belonging to a single clan.) Chhetri subcaste that is widely accepted to be of patrilineal Rajput origin from present day India.

== Notable people with the surname Rayamajhi ==
- Keshar Jung Rayamajhi, Advisor to late King Birendra Bir Bikram Shah
- Top Bahadur Rayamajhi, Deputy Prime Ministers
- Dhan Bahadur Rayamajhi, Nepali political, Member of Parliament of Nepal(नेपालको संविधान सभा सदस्य)
- Deepak Rayamajhi, Nepali Film Director
- Dilip Rayamajhi, Nepali Film Actor, Dancer
- Narayan Rayamajhi, Nepali composer, lyricist, feature-film script writer, film director, and producer
- Rayamajhi Kuldevata Samiti
