= Kunwar (surname) =

Kunwar कुँवर
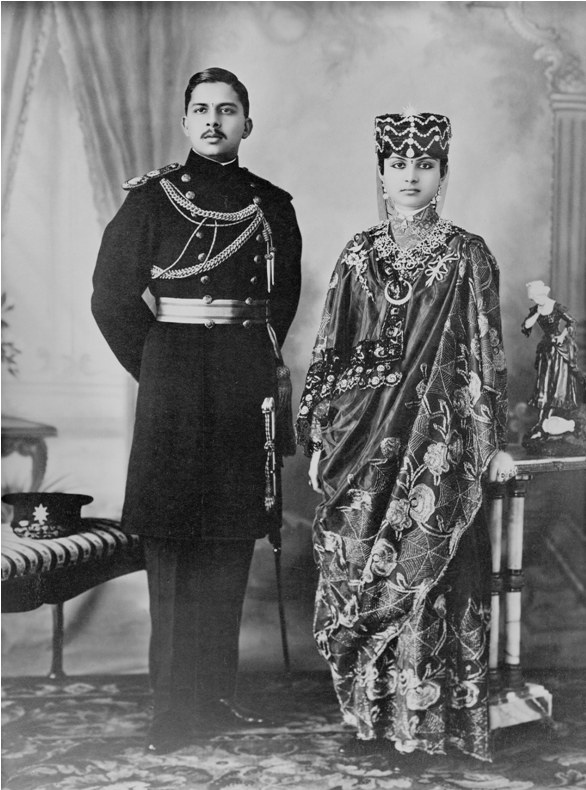
- Kunwar of Nepal
- Language: Nepali, Hindi, Kumaoni, Doteli, Rajasthani, Punjabi

Origin
- Language: Sanskrit
- Origin: South Asia
- Derivation: Kumar
- Meaning: Prince

Other names
- Variant forms: Konwar, Kuwar, Kanwar, Kumar
- Derivatives: Kunwar Rana, Kunwar Saheb
- See also: Rana, Kanwar

Kunwar (Nepali: कुँवर) is a surname of Nepalese and Indian people. The name Kunwar is coined to denote a young prince in South Asia region. It is also spelt as Rajkonwar for Ahom Royal Princes in Assam

Kunwar is a prominent Chhetri caste of Nepal that comprises several sub clans: Bagale, Khulal, Khadka, Rayamajhi and others. The Rana dynasty, which ruled Nepal from 1846 to 1951, originated from the Kunwar family and is traditionally believed to have belonged to the Khadka Kunwar lineage. Over time, members of the dynasty adopted the surname Rana.

== Notable people with surname Kunwar in Nepal ==
- Ram Krishna Kunwar, Nepalese warlord during rule of King Prithvi Narayan Shah
- Ranajit Kunwar, Nepalese military commander and governor
- Chandrabir Kunwar, Nepalese governor and military commander
- Bal Narsingh Kunwar, Nepalese military officer and courtier
- Balbhadra Kunwar; Nepalese military commander
- Jung Bahadur Kunwar Rana; Eighth Prime Minister of Nepal and Founder of 104 years old Rana dynasty in Nepal
- Bam Bahadur Kunwar, Ninth Prime Minister of Nepal
- Ranodip Singh Kunwar; Tenth Prime Minister of Nepal. Fifth Brother of Jung Bahadur
- Dhir Shamsher Kunwar Rana, Commander-in-chief of the Nepalese Army, youngest brother of Jung Bahadur
- Ramjee Kunwar, Nepalese politician
- Kabita Kunwar, Nepalese cricketer
- Baburam Kunwar, First governor of Gandaki Province
- Basanta Bahadur Kunwar, 30th Inspector General of Police (IGP) of Nepal Police
- Krit Kunwar Rana, Nepali artist, psychology academic.
