= August 24 =

August 24 this year in various calendars
- Monday, 24 August 2026
Akan	Kurudwo
Armenian	5 Hoṙi 1476
Aztec	Atemoztli 6, 6 Ocēlōtl
Babylonian	10 Abu, 2337 SE
Balinese pawukon	Luang, Pepet, Pasah, Menala, Pon, Paniron, Coma of Matal, Yama, Nohan, Pati
Bengali	9 Bhadro, BS 1433
Chinese	Yang Metal Horse・Heart Mansion; Fire Horse Year, Month 7, Day 12 (Chushu, 14 days until Bailu)
Common Era	24 August 2026 CE
Coptic	18 Mesori, AM 1742
Egyptian	10 Tybi, 2775 NE
Ethiopian	18 Naḥasē, 2018 Amätä Məhrät
French Republican	Décade I, Septidi de Fructidor de l'Année 234 de la République
Gregorian	24 August, AD 2026
Hebrew	11 Elul, AM 5786
Hindu	Pūrvāṣāḍha・Prīti; Solar: 8 Bhādrapada, 1948 SE; Lunisolar: Dvādaśī, Śukla pakṣa of Śrāvaṇa, 2083 VE; Rāudra・5127 KY・1,872,811
Icelandic	Mánudagur, 30 Heyannir 2026
Islamic	10 Rabi' al-awwal, AH 1448 (using tabular method)
ISO week date	2026-W35-1
Japanese	12 Fumizuki, Reiwa 8 (Shosho, 14 days until Hakuro)
Julian	11 August, AD 2026 (AM 7534)
Julian day	2461277
Korean	12 Wonsungidal, 4359 DE
Maya	13.0.13.15.14; 7 Mol, 6 Ix
Roman	ante diem III Idus Augustas, MMDCCLXXIX AUC
Solar Hijri	2 Shahrivar, SH 1405
Tibetan	12 gro bzhin, me pho rta 2153 or 1772 or 1000

<<	August					>>
Su	Mo	Tu	We	Th	Fr	Sa
						1
2	3	4	5	6	7	8
9	10	11	12	13	14	15
16	17	18	19	20	21	22
23	24	25	26	27	28	29
30	31
2026

August 24 in recent years
2026 (Monday)
2025 (Sunday)
2024 (Saturday)
2023 (Thursday)
2022 (Wednesday)
2021 (Tuesday)
2020 (Monday)
2019 (Saturday)
2018 (Friday)
2017 (Thursday)

August 24 is the 236th day of the year (237th in leap years) in the Gregorian calendar; 129 days remain until the end of the year.

== Events ==
=== Pre-1600 ===
- 367 – Gratian, son of Roman Emperor Valentinian I, is named co-Augustus at the age of eight by his father.
- 394 – The Graffito of Esmet-Akhom, the latest known inscription in Egyptian hieroglyphs, is written.
- 410 – The Visigoths under King Alaric I begin to pillage Rome.
- 1185 – Sack of Thessalonica by the Normans.
- 1200 – King John of England, signer of the first Magna Carta, marries Isabella of Angoulême in Angoulême Cathedral.
- 1215 – Pope Innocent III issues a bull declaring Magna Carta invalid.
- 1217 – An English fleet defeats a French fleet in the battle of Sandwich, cutting off Prince Louis of France from supplies and diminishing his hopes to gain the English throne during the First Barons' War.
- 1349 – Six thousand Jews are killed in Mainz after being blamed for the bubonic plague.
- 1482 – The town and castle of Berwick-upon-Tweed is captured from Scotland by an English army.
- 1516 – The Ottoman Empire under Selim I defeats the Mamluk Sultanate and captures present-day Syria at the Battle of Marj Dabiq.
- 1561 – Willem of Orange marries duchess Anna of Saxony.

=== 1601–1900 ===
- 1608 – The first official English representative to India lands in Surat.
- 1643 – A Dutch fleet establishes a new colony in the ruins of Valdivia in southern Chile.
- 1662 – The 1662 Book of Common Prayer is legally enforced as the liturgy of the Church of England, precipitating the Great Ejection of Dissenter ministers from their benefices.
- 1675 – A Polish-Lithuanian army under John III Sobieski defeats an Ottoman-Tartar army in the battle of Lwow.
- 1682 – William Penn receives the area that is now the state of Delaware, and adds it to his colony of Pennsylvania.
- 1690 – Job Charnock of the East India Company establishes a factory in Calcutta, an event formerly considered the founding of the city (in 2003 the Calcutta High Court ruled that the city's foundation date is unknown).
- 1743 – The War of the Hats: The Swedish army surrenders to the Russians in Helsinki, ending the war and starting Lesser Wrath.
- 1781 – American Revolutionary War: A small force of Pennsylvania militia is ambushed and overwhelmed by an American Indian group, which forces George Rogers Clark to abandon his attempt to attack Detroit.
- 1789 – The first naval battle of the Svensksund begins in the Gulf of Finland.
- 1812 – Peninsular War: A coalition of Spanish, British, and Portuguese forces succeed in lifting the two-and-a-half-year-long Siege of Cádiz.
- 1814 – British troops capture Washington, D.C. and set the Presidential Mansion, Capitol, Navy Yard and many other public buildings ablaze.
- 1815 – The modern Constitution of the Netherlands is signed.
- 1816 – The Treaty of St. Louis is signed in St. Louis, Missouri.
- 1820 – Constitutionalist insurrection at Oporto, Portugal.
- 1821 – The Treaty of Córdoba is signed in Córdoba, now in Veracruz, Mexico, concluding the Mexican War of Independence from Spain.
- 1857 – The Panic of 1857 begins, setting off one of the most severe economic crises in United States history.
- 1870 – The Wolseley expedition reaches Manitoba to end the Red River Rebellion.
- 1898 – Count Muravyov, Foreign Minister of Russia presents a rescript that convoked the First Hague Peace Conference.

=== 1901–present ===
- 1909 – Workers start pouring concrete for the Panama Canal.
- 1911 – Manuel de Arriaga is elected and sworn in as the first President of Portugal.
- 1914 – World War I: German troops capture Namur.
- 1914 – World War I: The Battle of Cer ends as the first Allied victory in the war.
- 1929 – Second day of two-day Hebron massacre during the 1929 Palestine riots: Arab attacks on the Jewish community in Hebron in the British Mandate of Palestine, result in the death of 65–68 Jews; the remaining Jews are forced to flee the city.
- 1931 – Resignation of the United Kingdom's Second Labour Government. Formation of the UK National Government.
- 1932 – Amelia Earhart becomes the first woman to fly across the United States non-stop (from Los Angeles to Newark, New Jersey).
- 1933 – The Crescent Limited train derails in Washington, D.C., after the bridge it is crossing is washed out by the 1933 Chesapeake–Potomac hurricane.
- 1936 – The Australian Antarctic Territory is created.
- 1937 – Spanish Civil War: the Basque Army surrenders to the Italian Corpo Truppe Volontarie following the Santoña Agreement.
- 1937 – Spanish Civil War: Sovereign Council of Asturias and León is proclaimed in Gijón.
- 1938 – Kweilin incident: A Japanese warplane shoots down the Kweilin, a Chinese civilian airliner, killing 14. It is the first recorded instance of a civilian airliner being shot down.
- 1941 – The Holocaust: Adolf Hitler orders the cessation of Nazi Germany's systematic T4 euthanasia program of the mentally ill and the handicapped due to protests, although killings continue for the remainder of the war.
- 1942 – World War II: The Battle of the Eastern Solomons. Japanese aircraft carrier Ryūjō is sunk, with the loss of seven officers and 113 crewmen. The US carrier USS Enterprise is heavily damaged.
- 1944 – World War II: Allied troops begin the attack on Paris.
- 1949 – The treaty creating the North Atlantic Treaty Organization goes into effect.
- 1950 – Edith Sampson becomes the first black U.S. delegate to the United Nations.
- 1951 – United Air Lines Flight 615 crashes near Decoto, California, killing 50 people.
- 1954 – The Communist Control Act goes into effect, outlawing the Communist Party in the United States.
- 1954 – Vice president João Café Filho takes office as president of Brazil, following the suicide of Getúlio Vargas.
- 1963 – Buddhist crisis: As a result of the Xá Lợi Pagoda raids, the US State Department cables the United States Embassy, Saigon to encourage Army of the Republic of Vietnam generals to launch a coup against President Ngô Đình Diệm if he did not remove his brother Ngô Đình Nhu.
- 1967 – Led by Abbie Hoffman, the Youth International Party temporarily disrupts trading at the New York Stock Exchange by throwing dollar bills from the viewing gallery, causing trading to cease as brokers scramble to grab them.
- 1970 – Vietnam War protesters bomb Sterling Hall at the University of Wisconsin–Madison, leading to an international manhunt for the perpetrators.
- 1981 – Mark David Chapman is sentenced to 20 years to life in prison for murdering John Lennon.
- 1989 – Colombian drug barons declare "total war" on the Colombian government.
- 1989 – Tadeusz Mazowiecki is chosen as the first non-communist prime minister in Central and Eastern Europe.
- 1991 – Mikhail Gorbachev resigns as head of the Communist Party of the Soviet Union.
- 1991 – Ukraine declares itself independent from the Soviet Union.
- 1992 – Hurricane Andrew makes landfall in Homestead, Florida as a Category 5 hurricane, causing up to $25 billion (1992 USD) in damages.
- 1995 – Microsoft releases Windows 95 to the public in North America.
- 1998 – First radio-frequency identification (RFID) human implantation tested in the United Kingdom.
- 2001 – Air Transat Flight 236 loses all engine power over the Atlantic Ocean, forcing the pilots to conduct an emergency landing in the Azores.
- 2004 – Ninety passengers die after two airliners explode after flying out of Domodedovo International Airport, near Moscow. The explosions are caused by suicide bombers from Chechnya.
- 2006 – The International Astronomical Union (IAU) redefines the term "planet" such that Pluto is now considered a dwarf planet.
- 2008 – Sixty-five passengers are killed when Iran Aseman Airlines Flight 6895 crashes during an emergency landing at Manas International Airport in Bishkek, Kyrgyzstan.
- 2008 – A Cessna 208 Caravan crashes in Cabañas, Zacapa, Guatemala, killing 11 people.
- 2010 – In San Fernando, Tamaulipas, Mexico, 72 illegal immigrants are killed by Los Zetas and eventually found dead by Mexican authorities.
- 2010 – Henan Airlines Flight 8387 crashes at Yichun Lindu Airport in Yichun, Heilongjiang, China, killing 44 out of the 96 people on board.
- 2010 – Agni Air Flight 101 crashes near Shikharpur, Makwanpur, Nepal, killing all 14 people on board.
- 2012 – Anders Behring Breivik, perpetrator of the 2011 Norway attacks, is sentenced to 21 years of preventive detention.
- 2014 – A magnitude 6.0 earthquake strikes the San Francisco Bay Area; it is the largest in that area since 1989.
- 2016 – An earthquake strikes Central Italy with a magnitude of 6.2, with aftershocks felt as far as Rome and Florence. Around 300 people are killed.
- 2016 – Proxima Centauri b, the closest exoplanet to Earth, is discovered by the European Southern Observatory.
- 2017 – The National Space Agency of Taiwan successfully launches the observation satellite Formosat-5 into space.
- 2020 – Erin O'Toole is elected leader of the Conservative Party of Canada.
- 2023 – Japan officially begins discharging treated radioactive water from the Fukushima Daiichi Nuclear Power Plant into the Pacific Ocean, sparking international concerns and condemnation.

== Births ==
=== Pre-1600 ===
- 1016 – Fujiwara no Genshi, Japanese empress consort (died 1039)
- 1113 – Geoffrey Plantagenet, Count of Anjou (died 1151)
- 1198 – Alexander II of Scotland (died 1249)
- 1358 – John I of Castile (died 1390)
- 1393 – Arthur III, Duke of Brittany (died 1458)
- 1423 – Thomas Rotherham, English cleric (died 1500)
- 1498 – John, Hereditary Prince of Saxony (died 1537)
- 1510 – Elisabeth of Brandenburg, Duchess of Brunswick-Calenberg-Göttingen (died 1558)
- 1552 – Lavinia Fontana, Italian painter and educator (died 1614)
- 1556 – Sophia Brahe, Danish horticulturalist and astronomer (died 1643)
- 1561 – Thomas Howard, 1st Earl of Suffolk (died 1626)
- 1578 – John Taylor, English poet and author (died 1653)
- 1591 – Robert Herrick, English poet and cleric (died 1674)

=== 1601–1900 ===
- 1631 – Philip Henry, English minister (died 1696)
- 1635 – Peder Griffenfeld, Danish lawyer and politician (died 1699)
- 1684 – Sir Robert Munro, 6th Baronet, British politician (died 1746)
- 1714 – Alaungpaya, Burmese king (died 1760)
- 1758 – Duchess Sophia Frederica of Mecklenburg-Schwerin (died 1794)
- 1759 – William Wilberforce, English philanthropist and politician (died 1833)
- 1772 – William I of the Netherlands (died 1840)
- 1787 – James Weddell, Belgian-English sailor, hunter, and explorer (died 1834)
- 1816 – Daniel Gooch, English engineer, laid 1st successful transatlantic cables (died 1889)
- 1824 – Antonio Stoppani, Italian geologist and scholar (died 1891)
- 1837 – Théodore Dubois, French organist, composer, and educator (died 1924)
- 1843 – Boyd Dunlop Morehead, Australian politician, 10th Premier of Queensland (died 1905)
- 1845 – James Calhoun, American lieutenant (died 1876)
- 1851 – Tom Kendall, Australian cricketer and journalist (died 1924)
- 1852 – Agnes Marshall, English culinary entrepreneur, inventor, and celebrity chef (died 1905)
- 1860 – David Bowman, Australian lawyer and politician (died 1916)
- 1862 – Zonia Baber, American geographer and geologist (died 1956)
- 1863 – Dragutin Lerman, Croatian explorer (died 1918)
- 1865 – Ferdinand I of Romania (died 1927)
- 1872 – Max Beerbohm, English essayist, parodist, and caricaturist (died 1956)
- 1884 – Earl Derr Biggers, American author and playwright (died 1933)
- 1887 – Harry Hooper, American baseball player (died 1974)
- 1888 – Valentine Baker, Welsh co-founder of the Martin-Baker Aircraft Company (died 1942)
- 1890 – Duke Kahanamoku, American swimmer, actor, and surfer (died 1968)
- 1890 – Jean Rhys, Dominican-British novelist (died 1979)
- 1893 – Haim Ernst Wertheimer, German-Israeli biochemist and academic (died 1978)
- 1895 – Richard Cushing, American cardinal (died 1970)
- 1897 – Fred Rose, American pianist, songwriter, and publisher (died 1954)
- 1898 – Malcolm Cowley, American novelist, poet, literary critic (died 1989)
- 1899 – Jorge Luis Borges, Argentine short-story writer, essayist, poet and translator (died 1986)
- 1899 – Albert Claude, Belgian biologist and academic, Nobel Prize laureate (died 1983)
- 1900 – Preston Foster, American actor (died 1970)

=== 1901–present ===
- 1902 – Fernand Braudel, French historian and academic (died 1985)
- 1902 – Carlo Gambino, Italian-American mob boss (died 1976)
- 1903 – Karl Hanke, German businessman and politician (died 1945)
- 1903 – Mohammad Yamin, Indonesian poet, revolutionary, and politician (died 1962)
- 1904 – Ida Cook, English campaigner for Jewish refugees, and romantic novelist as Mary Burchell (died 1986)
- 1905 – Arthur "Big Boy" Crudup, American singer-songwriter and guitarist (died 1974)
- 1905 – Siaka Stevens, Sierra Leonean police officer and politician, 1st President of Sierra Leone (died 1988)
- 1907 – Bruno Giacometti, Swiss architect, designed the Hallenstadion (died 2012)
- 1908 – Shivaram Rajguru, Indian activist (died 1931)
- 1909 – Ronnie Grieveson, South African cricketer and soldier (died 1998)
- 1913 – Charles Snead Houston, American physician and mountaineer (died 2009)
- 1915 – Wynonie Harris, American singer and guitarist (died 1969)
- 1915 – James Tiptree Jr. (Alice Bradley Sheldon), American psychologist and science fiction author (died 1987)
- 1916 – Anita Figueredo, American physician and humanitarian (died 2010)
- 1918 – Sikander Bakht, Indian field hockey player and politician, Indian Minister of External Affairs (died 2004)
- 1919 – Tosia Altman, member of the Polish resistance in World War II (died 1943)
- 1919 – J. Gordon Edwards, American entomologist, mountaineer, and DDT advocate (died 2004)
- 1919 – Enrique Llanes, Mexican wrestler (died 2004)
- 1919 – Niels Viggo Bentzon, Danish composer and pianist (died 2000)
- 1920 – Alex Colville, Canadian painter and academic (died 2013)
- 1921 – Eric Simms, English ornithologist and conservationist (died 2009)
- 1922 – René Lévesque, Canadian journalist and politician, 23rd Premier of Quebec (died 1987)
- 1922 – Howard Zinn, American historian, author, and activist (died 2010)
- 1923 – Arthur Jensen, American psychologist and academic (died 2012)
- 1924 – Alyn Ainsworth, English singer and conductor (died 1990)
- 1924 – Louis Teicher, American pianist (died 2008)
- 1926 – Nancy Spero, American painter and academic (died 2009)
- 1927 – Anjali Devi, Indian actress and producer (died 2014)
- 1927 – David Ireland, Australian author and playwright (died 2022)
- 1927 – Harry Markowitz, American economist and academic, Nobel Prize laureate (died 2023)
- 1929 – Betty Dodson, American author and educator (died 2020)
- 1929 – Pierre Mazeaud, French jurist, politician and alpinist
- 1930 – Jackie Brenston, American singer-songwriter and saxophonist (died 1979)
- 1930 – Roger McCluskey, American race car driver (died 1993)
- 1932 – Robert D. Hales, American captain and religious leader (died 2017)
- 1932 – Richard Meale, Australian pianist and composer (died 2009)
- 1932 – Cormac Murphy-O'Connor, English cardinal (died 2017)
- 1933 – Prince Rupert Loewenstein, Spanish-English banker and manager (died 2014)
- 1934 – Kenny Baker, English actor (died 2016)
- 1936 – A. S. Byatt, English novelist and poet (died 2023)
- 1936 – Kenny Guinn, American banker and politician, 27th Governor of Nevada (died 2010)
- 1936 – Arthur B. C. Walker Jr., American physicist and academic (died 2001)
- 1937 – Moshood Abiola, Nigerian businessman and politician (died 1998)
- 1937 – Susan Sheehan, Austrian-American journalist and author (died 2026)
- 1938 – David Freiberg, American singer and bass player
- 1938 – Mason Williams, American guitarist and composer
- 1940 – Madsen Pirie, British academic, President and co-founder of the Adam Smith Institute
- 1940 – Francine Lalonde, Canadian educator and politician (died 2014)
- 1940 – Keith Savage, English rugby player
- 1941 – Alan M. Roberts, English academic, Professor of Zoology at the University of Bristol
- 1942 – Max Cleland, American captain and politician (died 2021)
- 1942 – Jimmy Soul, American pop-soul singer (died 1988)
- 1942 – Karen Uhlenbeck, American mathematician
- 1942 – Hans Peter Korff, German actor (died 2025)
- 1943 – John Cipollina, American rock guitarist (died 1989)
- 1944 – Bill Goldsworthy, Canadian-American ice hockey player and coach (died 1996)
- 1944 – Gregory Jarvis, American engineer, and astronaut (died 1986)
- 1944 – Rocky Johnson, Canadian-American wrestler and trainer (died 2020)
- 1945 – Ronee Blakley, American singer-songwriter, producer, and actress
- 1945 – Molly Duncan, Scottish saxophonist (died 2019)
- 1945 – Ken Hensley, English rock singer-songwriter and musician (died 2020)
- 1945 – Marsha P. Johnson, American gay liberation activist and drag queen (died 1992)
- 1945 – Vince McMahon, American wrestler, promoter, and entrepreneur; co-founded WWE
- 1947 – Anne Archer, American actress and producer
- 1947 – Paulo Coelho, Brazilian author and songwriter
- 1947 – Roger De Vlaeminck, Belgian cyclist and coach
- 1947 – Joe Manchin, American politician, 34th Governor of West Virginia
- 1947 – Vladimir Masorin, Russian admiral
- 1948 – Kim Sung-il, South Korean commander and pilot
- 1948 – Jean Michel Jarre, French pianist, composer, and producer
- 1948 – Sauli Niinistö, Finnish captain and politician, 12th President of Finland
- 1948 – Alexander McCall Smith, Rhodesian-Scottish author and educator
- 1949 – Stephen Paulus, American composer and educator (died 2014)
- 1949 – Joe Regalbuto, American actor and director
- 1950 – Dorothy L. Cheney, American primatologist (died 2018)
- 1951 – Danny Joe Brown, American southern rock singer-songwriter and musician (died 2005)
- 1951 – Orson Scott Card, American novelist, critic, public speaker, essayist, and columnist
- 1951 – Oscar Hijuelos, American author and academic (died 2013)
- 1952 – Marion Bloem, Dutch author, director, and painter
- 1952 – Linton Kwesi Johnson, Jamaican dub poet
- 1953 – Sam Torrance, Scottish golfer and sportscaster
- 1954 – Alain Daigle, Canadian ice hockey player
- 1954 – Heini Otto, Dutch footballer, coach, and manager
- 1955 – Kevin Dunn, American actor
- 1955 – Mike Huckabee, American minister and politician, 44th Governor of Arkansas
- 1956 – Gerry Cooney, American boxer
- 1957 – Jeffrey Daniel, American singer-songwriter and dancer
- 1957 – Stephen Fry, English actor, journalist, producer, and screenwriter
- 1958 – Steve Guttenberg, American actor and producer
- 1960 – Cal Ripken Jr., American baseball player and coach
- 1961 – Jared Harris, English actor
- 1962 – Craig Kilborn, American television host
- 1962 – Emile Roemer, Dutch educator and politician
- 1963 – John Bush, American singer-songwriter
- 1963 – Hideo Kojima, Japanese director, screenwriter and video game designer
- 1963 – Peter Rufai, Nigerian footballer (died 2025)
- 1964 – Éric Bernard, French racing driver
- 1964 – Oteil Burbridge, American bassist (Allman Brothers Band, Dead & Company)
- 1964 – Mark Cerny, American video game designer, programmer, producer and business executive
- 1964 – Salizhan Sharipov, Kyrgyzstani-Russian lieutenant, pilot, and astronaut
- 1965 – Marlee Matlin, American actress and producer
- 1965 – Reggie Miller, American basketball player and sportscaster
- 1965 – Brian Rajadurai, Sri Lankan-Canadian cricketer
- 1967 – Michael Thomas, English footballer
- 1968 – Benoît Brunet, Canadian ice hockey player and sportscaster
- 1968 – Shoichi Funaki, Japanese-American wrestler and sportscaster
- 1968 – Andreas Kisser, Brazilian guitarist, songwriter, and producer
- 1968 – Tim Salmon, American baseball player and sportscaster
- 1969 – Jans Koerts, Dutch cyclist
- 1970 – Rich Beem, American golfer
- 1970 – David Gregory, American journalist
- 1970 – Tugay Kerimoğlu, Turkish footballer and manager
- 1972 – Jean-Luc Brassard, Canadian skier and radio host
- 1972 – Ava DuVernay, American director and screenwriter
- 1972 – Todd Young, American politician
- 1973 – Andrew Brunette, Canadian ice hockey player and coach
- 1973 – Dave Chappelle, American comedian, actor, producer and screenwriter
- 1973 – James D'Arcy, English actor
- 1973 – Inge de Bruijn, Dutch swimmer
- 1973 – Carmine Giovinazzo, American actor
- 1974 – Jennifer Lien, American actress
- 1975 – Roberto Colombo, Italian footballer
- 1975 – Mark de Vries, Surinamese-Dutch footballer
- 1976 – Simon Dennis, English rower and academic
- 1976 – Alex O'Loughlin, Australian actor, writer, director, and producer
- 1977 – Denílson de Oliveira Araújo, Brazilian footballer
- 1977 – Robert Enke, German footballer (died 2009)
- 1977 – Per Gade, Danish footballer
- 1977 – John Green, American author and vlogger
- 1977 – Jürgen Macho, Austrian footballer
- 1978 – Derek Morris, Canadian ice hockey player
- 1979 – Vahur Afanasjev, Estonian author and poet
- 1979 – Orlando Engelaar, Dutch footballer
- 1979 – Kaki King, American guitarist, lap steel guitar player and composer
- 1979 – Michael Redd, American basketball player
- 1981 – Chad Michael Murray, American actor, model, and author
- 1982 – José Bosingwa, Portuguese footballer
- 1982 – Kim Källström, Swedish footballer
- 1983 – Brett Gardner, American baseball player
- 1983 – Marcel Goc, German ice hockey player
- 1984 – Erin Molan, Australian journalist and sportscaster
- 1984 – Charlie Villanueva, Dominican-American basketball player
- 1984 – Yesung, South Korean singer
- 1986 – Joseph Akpala, Nigerian footballer
- 1986 – Arian Foster, American football player, rapper, and actor
- 1987 – Anže Kopitar, Slovenian ice hockey player
- 1988 – Rupert Grint, English actor
- 1988 – Brad Hunt, Canadian ice hockey player
- 1988 – Manu Ma'u, New Zealand rugby league player
- 1988 – Maya Yoshida, Japanese footballer
- 1989 – Reynaldo, Brazilian footballer
- 1989 – Rocío Igarzábal, Argentinian actress and singer
- 1990 – Juan Pedro Lanzani, Argentinian actor and singer
- 1990 – Luke Lawrence, American sailor
- 1991 – Enrique Hernández, Puerto Rican baseball player
- 1991 – Wang Zhen, Chinese race walker
- 1992 – Jemerson, Brazilian footballer
- 1993 – Maryna Zanevska, Belgian tennis player
- 1994 – Kelsey Plum, American basketball player
- 1995 – Noah Vonleh, American basketball player
- 1995 – Lady Amelia Windsor, member of the British royal family
- 1997 – Alan Walker, British-Norwegian DJ and record producer
- 1997 – Karoline Leavitt, White House Press Secretary
- 1998 – Sofia Richie, American model and social media personality
- 2000 – Griffin Gluck, American actor
- 2001 – Mildred Maldonado, Mexican rhythmic gymnast

== Deaths ==
=== Pre-1600 ===
- 691 – Fu Youyi, official of the Tang Dynasty
- 842 – Saga, Japanese emperor (born 786)
- 895 – Guthred, king of Northumbria
- 927 – Doulu Ge, chancellor of Later Tang
- 927 – Wei Yue, chancellor of Later Tang
- 942 – Liu, empress dowager of Later Jin
- 948 – Zhang Ye, Chinese general and chancellor
- 1042 – Michael V Kalaphates, Byzantine emperor (born 1015)
- 1103 – Magnus Barefoot, Norwegian king (born 1073)
- 1217 – Eustace the Monk, French pirate (born 1170)
- 1313 – Henry VII, Holy Roman Emperor (born 1275)
- 1372 – Casimir III, Duke of Pomerania (born 1348)
- 1497 – Sophie of Pomerania, Duchess of Pomerania (born 1435)
- 1507 – Cecily of York, English princess (born 1469)
- 1540 – Parmigianino, Italian painter and etcher (born 1503)
- 1542 – Gasparo Contarini, Italian cardinal (born 1483)
- 1572 – Gaspard II de Coligny, French admiral (born 1519)
- 1572 – Charles de Téligny, French soldier and diplomat (born 1535)
- 1595 – Thomas Digges, English mathematician and astronomer (born 1546)

=== 1601–1900 ===
- 1617 – Rose of Lima, Peruvian saint (born 1586)
- 1647 – Nicholas Stone, English sculptor and architect (born 1586)
- 1679 – Jean François Paul de Gondi, French cardinal and author (born 1614)
- 1680 – Thomas Blood, Irish colonel (born 1618)
- 1680 – Ferdinand Bol, Dutch painter and etcher (born 1616)
- 1683 – John Owen, English theologian and academic (born 1616)
- 1759 – Ewald Christian von Kleist, German poet and soldier (born 1715)
- 1770 – Thomas Chatterton, English poet and prodigy (born 1752)
- 1779 – Cosmas of Aetolia, Greek monk and saint (born 1714)
- 1798 – Thomas Alcock, English priest and author (born 1709)
- 1804 – Peggy Shippen, American wife of Benedict Arnold and American Revolutionary War spy (born 1760)
- 1818 – James Carr, American lawyer and politician (born 1777)
- 1821 – John William Polidori, English writer and physician (born 1795)
- 1832 – Nicolas Léonard Sadi Carnot, French physicist and engineer (born 1796)
- 1832 – Richard Weymouth, British Royal Navy commander (born 1780/81)
- 1838 – Ferenc Kölcsey, Hungarian poet, critic, and politician (born 1790)
- 1841 – Theodore Hook, English civil servant and composer (born 1788)
- 1841 – John Ordronaux, French-American soldier (born 1778)
- 1888 – Rudolf Clausius, German physicist and mathematician (born 1822)
- 1895 – Albert F. Mummery, English mountaineer and author (born 1855)

=== 1901–present ===
- 1923 – Kate Douglas Wiggin, American author and educator (born 1856)
- 1930 – Tom Norman, English businessman and showman (born 1860)
- 1932 – Kate M. Gordon, American activist (born 1861)
- 1939 – Frederick Carl Frieseke, American painter and educator (born 1874)
- 1940 – Paul Gottlieb Nipkow, Polish-German technician and inventor, invented the Nipkow disk (born 1860)
- 1943 – Antonio Alice, Argentinian painter and educator (born 1886)
- 1943 – Ettore Muti Italian aviator, adventurer and politician (born 1902)
- 1943 – Simone Weil, French philosopher and activist (born 1909)
- 1946 – James Clark McReynolds, American lawyer and judge, 48th United States Attorney General (born 1862)
- 1954 – Getúlio Vargas, Brazilian lawyer and politician, 14th President of Brazil (born 1882)
- 1956 – Kenji Mizoguchi, Japanese director and screenwriter (born 1898)
- 1957 – Ronald Knox, English Catholic priest (born 1888)
- 1958 – Paul Henry, Irish painter and educator (born 1876)
- 1967 – Henry J. Kaiser, American businessman, founded Kaiser Shipyards and Kaiser Aluminum (born 1882)
- 1974 – Alexander P. de Seversky, Russian-American pilot and businessman, co-founded Republic Aviation (born 1894)
- 1977 – Buddy O'Connor, Canadian ice hockey player (born 1916)
- 1978 – Louis Prima, American singer-songwriter, trumpet player, and actor (born 1910)
- 1979 – Hanna Reitsch, German soldier and pilot (born 1912)
- 1980 – Yootha Joyce, English actress (born 1927)
- 1982 – Félix-Antoine Savard, Canadian priest and author (born 1896)
- 1983 – Kalevi Kotkas, Estonian-Finnish high jumper and discus thrower (born 1913)
- 1983 – Scott Nearing, American economist, educator, and activist (born 1883)
- 1985 – Paul Creston, American composer and educator (born 1906)
- 1987 – Malcolm Kirk, English rugby player and wrestler (born 1936)
- 1990 – Sergei Dovlatov, Russian-American journalist and author (born 1941)
- 1990 – Gely Abdel Rahman, Sudanese-Egyptian poet and academic (born 1931)
- 1991 – Bernard Castro, Italian-American inventor (born 1904)
- 1992 – André Donner, Dutch academic and judge (born 1918)
- 1997 – Luigi Villoresi, Italian racing driver (born 1907)
- 1998 – E. G. Marshall, American actor (born 1910)
- 1999 – Mary Jane Croft, American actress (born 1916)
- 1999 – Alexandre Lagoya, Egyptian guitarist and composer (born 1929)
- 2000 – Andy Hug, Swiss martial artist and kick-boxer (born 1964)
- 2001 – Jane Greer, American actress (born 1924)
- 2001 – Roman Matsov, Estonian violinist, pianist, and conductor (born 1917)
- 2002 – Nikolay Guryanov, Russian priest and mystic (born 1909)
- 2003 – Wilfred Thesiger, Ethiopian-English explorer and author (born 1910)
- 2004 – Elisabeth Kübler-Ross, Swiss-American psychiatrist and academic (born 1926)
- 2005 – Jamshed Ansari, Pakistani film, television and radio actor (born 1942)
- 2006 – Rocco Petrone, American soldier and engineer (born 1926)
- 2006 – Léopold Simoneau, Canadian tenor and educator (born 1916)
- 2007 – Andrée Boucher, Canadian educator and politician, 39th Mayor of Quebec City (born 1937)
- 2007 – Aaron Russo, American director and producer (born 1943)
- 2010 – Satoshi Kon, Japanese director and screenwriter (born 1963)
- 2011 – Seyhan Erözçelik, Turkish poet and author (born 1962)
- 2011 – Mike Flanagan, American baseball player, coach, and sportscaster (born 1951)
- 2012 – Dadullah, Pakistani Taliban leader (born 1965)
- 2012 – Pauli Ellefsen, Faroese surveyor and politician, 6th Prime Minister of the Faroe Islands (born 1936)
- 2012 – Steve Franken, American actor (born 1932)
- 2012 – Félix Miélli Venerando, Brazilian footballer and manager (born 1937)
- 2013 – Gerry Baker, American soccer player and manager (born 1938)
- 2013 – Nílton de Sordi, Brazilian footballer and manager (born 1931)
- 2013 – Julie Harris, American actress (born 1925)
- 2013 – Muriel Siebert, American businesswoman and philanthropist (born 1928)
- 2014 – Richard Attenborough, English actor, director, producer, and politician (born 1923)
- 2014 – Antônio Ermírio de Moraes, Brazilian businessman (born 1928)
- 2015 – Charlie Coffey, American football player and coach (born 1934)
- 2015 – Joseph F. Traub, German-American computer scientist and academic (born 1932)
- 2015 – Justin Wilson, English racing driver (born 1978)
- 2016 – Walter Scheel, German politician, 4th President of Germany (born 1919)
- 2017 – Jay Thomas, American actor, comedian, and radio talk show host (born 1948)
- 2020 – Gail Sheehy, American author, journalist, and lecturer (born 1936)
- 2021 – Charlie Watts, English musician (born 1941)
- 2023 – Bray Wyatt, American wrestler (born 1987)
- 2024 – Christoph Daum, German footballer and manager (born 1953)
- 2026 – Billy Boston, Welsh rugby player and soldier (born 1934)
- 2026 – Sliman Mansour, Palestinian painter and sculptor (born 1947)
- 2026 – Jaye P. Morgan, American singer and actress (born 1931)

== Holidays and observances ==
- Christian feast day:
  - Aurea of Ostia
  - Bartholomew the Apostle (Roman Catholic, Anglican)
  - Edward Klinik
  - Emily de Vialar
  - Jeanne-Antide Thouret
  - Maria Micaela Desmaisieres
  - Massa Candida (Martyrs of Utica)
  - Owen (Audoin)
  - August 24 (Eastern Orthodox liturgics)
- Flag Day (Liberia)
- Independence Day or Den' Nezalezhnosti, celebrates the independence of Ukraine from the Soviet Union in 1991.
- International Strange Music Day
- National Waffle Day (United States)
- Nostalgia Night (Uruguay)
- Willka Raymi (Cusco, Peru)
