= Ferrar Fenton =

Writer of the Ferrar Fenton Bible

- Ferrar Fenton working on the Bible in Modern English
- Born: 1832; Waltham, Lincolnshire
- Died: 1920 (aged 87–88)

Ferrar Fenton, M.R.A.S. (1832-1920) was a London businessman, a manufacturer, and financial organizer. He is perhaps most well known for his translation of The Bible in Modern English, which is commonly referred to as the Ferrar Fenton Bible. Fenton made translation of the Bible a lifetime avocation, spending approximately fifty years working on his translation, with the goal "to study the Bible absolutely in its original languages, to ascertain what its writers actually said and thought."

== Early life and career ==
Ferrar Fenton was born in 1832 in Waltham, Lincolnshire, England. Initially educated by his father, R. C. Fenton, he then attended private school. Fenton's parents originally wanted him to go into ministry, but he lost interest in spiritual matters by age 20.

Following a university education, he began working in a factory, eventually becoming manager. He became involved in the diamond business in South Africa and eventually became head of DeBeers. While sources vary on the timing, at one point in his life a dishonest lawyer caused him to lose his fortune but he was able to recover and become successful again.

In 1902, he was elected to membership in the Royal Asiatic Society.

== Bible translation ==
Fenton was a Church of England Layman. It is said that he had knowledge of 25 Oriental and modern languages and dialects, including ancient Sanskrit, Greek, Hebrew and Latin. As a tradesman, he also had access to numerous ancient Septuagint and Masoretic manuscripts to aid in translation. He also used a Polyglot Bible for minimal referencing.

Viewing his career in business as background for his Bible translation work, Fenton said, "I hold my commercial experience to have been my most important field of education, divinely prepared to fit me to be a competent translator of the Bible, for it taught me what men are, and upon what motives they act, and by what influences they are controlled." According to Derek Wilson in The People's Bible, "Fenton set himself single-handedly to challenge the Darwinians and the higher critics and also to produce a new masterpiece in the English language which would replace the long-esteemed King James Version."

Fenton believed that unless a modern English version of the Bible were produced, the Christian faith would be lost and so he began work on his own translation in 1853. For the next 40 years, he only ever read his New Testament in Greek to avoid being influenced by previous translators. Fenton first released a modern version of Romans in 1882. His translation of Paul's epistles soon followed in 1883. He continued publishing other parts of the Bible, until the complete Bible was published in 1903, with revisions published until 1910.

The complete Ferrar Fenton Bible continues to remain in print, and is currently published by Destiny Publishers. For some, Fenton's objective of replacing the King James Bible would seem to be a success. However, the Fenton Bible never gained wide acceptance. The Cambridge History of the Bible, while referring to his translation as "sometimes erroneous and amateurish," suggests that the value of his work is in keeping the idea of modern language translation alive.

== Works ==
- Connection of the Welsh and Oriental Languages
- Seven Years of an Indian Officer's Life
- Plassey, an Ode
- Poems from the Persian
- Memoirs of G. Tresham Gregg, D.D., the Orientalist Rector of St. Patrick's, Dublin
- When I Served with General Gordon
- Life of Richard Fenton, K.C., F.A.S., the Historian
- Life of John Fenton, the Archaeologist
- St. Paul's Epistles in Modern English
- The New Testament in Modern English
- The Book of Job in Modern English and the Original Metre
- The Five Books of Moses, Direct from the Hebrew, in Modern English
- The Books of the Prophets in the Original Verse or Prose
- The Psalms and Sacred Writers
- Complete Holy Bible in Modern English, with Critical Notes
- The Bible and Wine - 1911
- The Command of the Ever-Living ... God's Law of Life with the Interpretation of the Prophets

== See also ==
- Edgar J. Goodspeed - translator of The Bible: An American Translation (the Goodspeed Bible, AAT)
- James Moffatt - translator of the Moffatt, New Translation Bible (MNT)
- Richard Francis Weymouth - translator of the Weymouth New Testament (WNT)
