= WNT =

WNT or Wnt may refer to:

- Windows NT
- WNT (Women's National Team)
- Wnt signaling pathway, a complex protein network
- The Weymouth New Testament (1902), translation by Richard Francis Weymouth
- ABC World News Tonight, ABC News' flagship evening news program
- Woordenboek der Nederlandsche Taal, a Dutch dictionary, the most extensive in the world
- Washington Naval Treaty, a 1922 naval arms limitation treaty
- Wandsworth Town railway station, London; National Rail station code
- Scientific-Technical Publishers, Wydawnictwa Naukowo-Techniczne in Poland
