= Andrew Hammond (ice hockey) =

Canadian ice hockey player (born 1988)

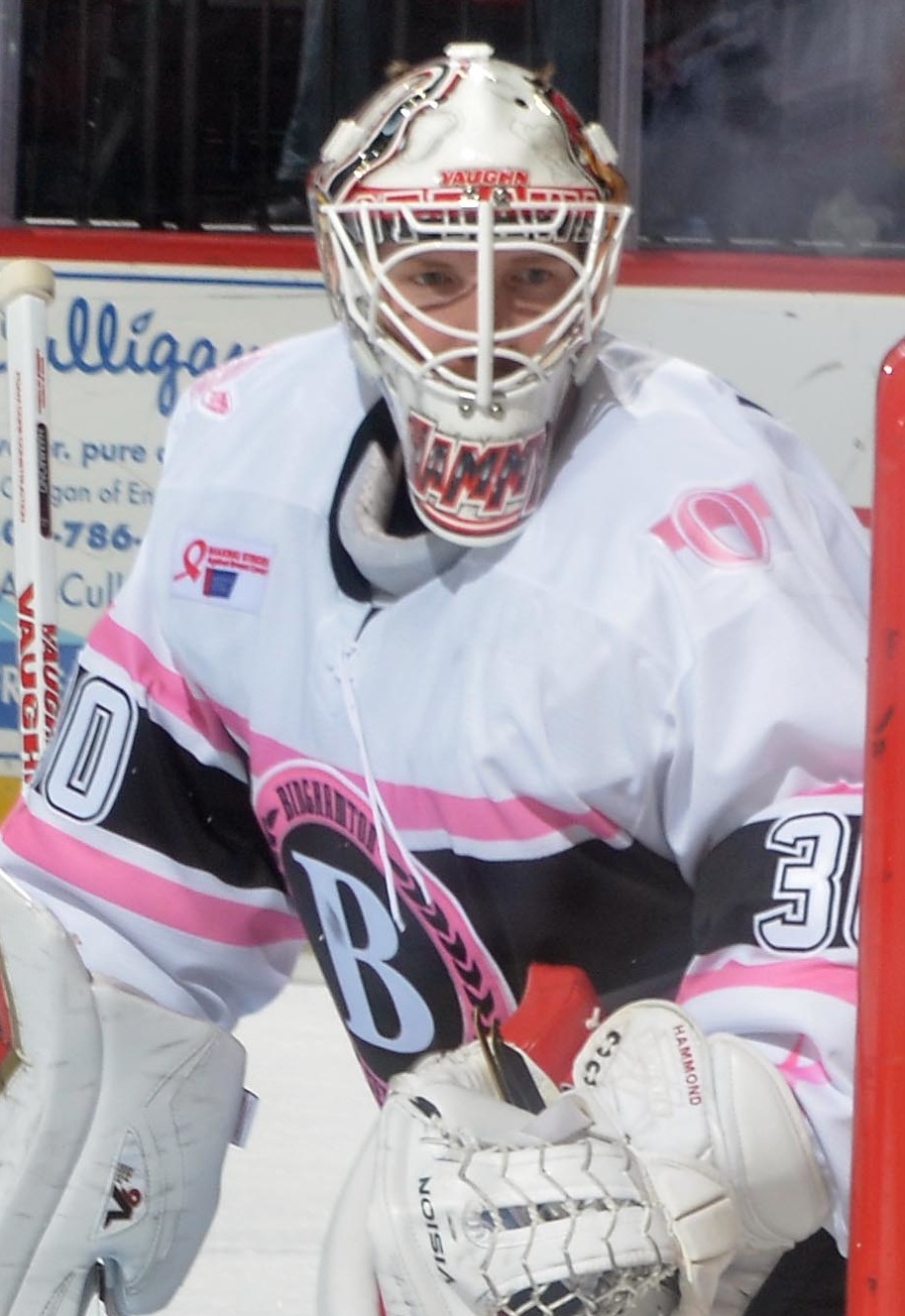
- Hammond with the Binghamton Senators in 2014
- Born: February 11, 1988 (age 38) White Rock, British Columbia, Canada
- Height: 6 ft 1 in (185 cm)
- Weight: 216 lb (98 kg; 15 st 6 lb)
- Position: Goaltender
- Caught: Left
- Played for: Ottawa Senators; Colorado Avalanche; Montreal Canadiens; New Jersey Devils; Traktor Chelyabinsk
- NHL draft: Undrafted
- Playing career: 2013–2022

Andrew Robert Hammond (born February 11, 1988) is a Canadian former professional ice hockey goaltender. He played in the National Hockey League (NHL) for the Ottawa Senators, Colorado Avalanche, Montreal Canadiens and New Jersey Devils. Nicknamed the "Hamburglar", he rose to fame in 2014–15 when he was called up from the minors and led the Senators to a 20–1–2 record to clinch a previously unthinkable Stanley Cup playoff berth.

== Playing career ==
=== Amateur ===
Hammond played his junior hockey in the British Columbia Hockey League (BCHL). He played one game with the Westside Warriors in the 2006–07 season before being cut by the team and returning to the Grandview Steelers of the Junior "B" Pacific Junior Hockey League to finish the season. Hammond played 32 games with the Surrey Eagles to start the 2007–08 BCHL season before being traded to the Vernon Vipers for $2,500. In his final season with the Vipers, the team won the Royal Bank Cup national Junior "A" championship and Hammond posted a 2–0 shutout in the final game.

Hammond attended Bowling Green State University where he played four seasons (2009 to 2013) with the Falcons ice hockey team. In 111 NCAA games, he earned a record of 30–68–13 and was named Bowling Green's Most Valuable Player for both the 2010–11 and 2011–12 seasons. It was at Bowling Green that Hammond's ability to "steal" wins for the Falcons prompted teammate Wade Finegan to start calling the goaltender "Robber," then "Burglar," then simply "Burgs." The nickname finally evolved to "The Hamburglar." A play on his name, the nickname refers to the McDonald's restaurants' mascot character whose likeness, in the guise of MAD magazines' Alfred E. Neuman, Hammond had painted onto his goalie mask.

=== Professional ===
==== Ottawa Senators (2013–2017) ====
The NHL's Ottawa Senators signed Hammond, a free agent, to a two-year, entry-level contract on March 20, 2013. He was subsequently assigned to the team's American Hockey League (AHL) affiliate, the Binghamton Senators, where he finished the 2012–13 season.

Hammond attended the Senators' training camp ahead of the 2013–14 season, but was later designated to Binghamton on September 30, 2013. He was recalled by Ottawa on February 26, 2014, to replace goaltender Craig Anderson, who was with his wife for the birth of the couple's second child. The next day, Hammond, who backed-up goaltender Robin Lehner, entered a game against the Detroit Red Wings at 5:05 of the second period after Lehner gave up six goals and was pulled. Hammond stopped all 11 shots he faced in the remainder of the game.

Hammond attended Ottawa's training camp ahead of the 2014–15 season, but on September 29, 2014, was again designated to Binghamton to start the season. He made his first career NHL start against the Montreal Canadiens at the Canadian Tire Centre on February 18, 2015, after goaltender Robin Lehner was injured in Ottawa's previous game. Hammond earned his first NHL victory in the game, stopping 42 shots in a 4–2 victory, also being named the game's First Star. Two games later, he recorded his first career NHL shutout as the Senators defeated the Anaheim Ducks 3–0, and the next day, he recorded his second consecutive shutout in a 1–0 win over the Los Angeles Kings. Hammond's four consecutive wins marked only the second time of the season that Ottawa won more than two games in a row. On March 2, 2015, Hammond was rewarded for his surprising success as the NHL named him the First Star of the Week. After winning a game against the Carolina Hurricanes in overtime on March 17, Hammond became just the second goaltender in NHL history to allow two goals or fewer in their first 12 starts, a feat matching Hockey Hall of Famer Frank Brimsek's record set during the 1938–39 season with the Boston Bruins.

On April 1, 2015, Hammond was named the NHL's First Star for the Month of March after compiling a 10–1–1 record with a 2.09 goals against average (GAA) and a .930 save percentage, helping the Senators climb to within three points of the final Wild Card spot in the Eastern Conference. On the same day, the Ottawa Chapter of the Professional Hockey Writers' Association announced Hammond as Ottawa's 2015 nominee for the Bill Masterton Memorial Trophy, awarded annually to the NHL player who best exemplifies the qualities of perseverance, sportsmanship and dedication to hockey. He came seventh in voting for the Vezina Trophy for the league's best goaltender and fifteenth in voting for the Hart Memorial Trophy for most valuable player to his team.

Hammond finished the 2014–15 regular season with a record of 20–1–2, helping the Senators clinch a Stanley Cup playoff berth, where they were ousted by the Montreal Canadiens in the first round of the Eastern Conference playoffs. Hammond started Ottawa's first two games of the series before being replaced by Craig Anderson for the following four games.

On May 20, shortly after the end of the Senators' season, Hammond was rewarded by signing a three-year, $4.05 million contract extension with Ottawa, carrying an average annual value of $1.35 million. In the following 2015–16 season, Hammond was unable to replicate his previous season success, winning just 7 out of 24 games with the Senators including a two-game return to the Binghamton Senators.

By the 2016–17 season, Hammond was struggling through a lack of form and hampered through injury. He appeared in just 6 games with Ottawa in a backup role going winless before on February 11, 2017, Hammond's 29th birthday, he was put on waivers by the Ottawa Senators after goaltender Craig Anderson returned from tending to his wife, who was suffering from cancer, and the recent success of backup goaltender Mike Condon. He was reassigned to Binghamton and appeared in just five games before suffering a tear in his right labrum requiring season-ending hip surgery on February 27, 2017.

==== Later years (2017–2022) ====
Hammond returned to full health in time for the 2017–18 season, his final year of contract with the Senators. After clearing waivers, he was assigned by Ottawa following training camp to new AHL affiliate, the Belleville Senators on September 29, 2017. On November 5, 2017, Hammond's contract was included by the Senators in a three-way trade with the Colorado Avalanche in exchange for Matt Duchene. With the Avalanche already at a surplus with goaltenders, Hammond was announced to remain with the Belleville Senators on loan from Colorado.

Hammond was recalled by the Avalanche on multiple occasions serving as backup through corresponding injuries to Avalanche duo, Semyon Varlamov and Jonathan Bernier. Before making an appearance with the Avalanche, Hammond was placed on the injured reserve after receiving an errant stick on the bench resulting in a concussion in a game against the Vancouver Canucks. Upon his recovery, Hammond was assigned to the Avalanche's AHL affiliate, the San Antonio Rampage on March 23, 2018. He was recalled by the Avalanche and started one game in the regular season, and then appeared in three playoff games, starting two of them.

As a free agent from the Avalanche, Hammond opted to continue his career in the Central Division, agreeing to a one-year, two-way contract to compete for the backup role with the Minnesota Wild on July 1, 2018.

Having left the Wild as a free agent after the conclusion of his contract, Hammond signed a one-year, two-way $700,000 contract with the Buffalo Sabres on July 1, 2019. In the following 2019–20 season, Hammond played exclusively with the Sabres' AHL affiliate, the Rochester Americans, matching his previous season total in playing 33 games while posting 16 wins.

On December 17, 2020, Hammond was signed as a free agent to return to the Minnesota Wild on a one-year, two-way contract. He was assigned to the Wild's taxi squad on January 13, 2021, and did not appear in a game during the 2020–21 season. On July 27, 2021, Hammond was re-signed by the Wild to a one-year, two-way contract extension.

In the following 2021–22 season, Hammond was assigned to the AHL, playing his first professional hockey in over a year by appearing in 11 games with Iowa, posting 6 wins. On February 12, 2022, Hammond was traded by the Wild to the injury-depleted Montreal Canadiens in exchange for Brandon Baddock. Eight days later on February 20, Hammond made his first regular season start in the NHL since March 28, 2018 in a 3–2 shootout victory over the New York Islanders. It was his first win in the NHL since April 9, 2016. He was then chosen to start against his former team, the Senators, marking his return to the Canadian Tire Centre five years after being traded. Canadiens coach Martin St. Louis said there was "a humanity piece" in the selection. Hammond made 26 saves in a 2–1 victory over the Senators. In his next start, a 5–4 victory over the Calgary Flames, he sustained a lower body injury and was placed on injured reserve on March 4.

Collecting three wins in four appearances (one of those in relief), Hammond's tenure with the Canadiens ended while in recovery from his injury, after he was dealt at the NHL trade deadline to the New Jersey Devils in exchange for Nate Schnarr on March 21, 2022. Canadiens general manager Kent Hughes said that with the return of Jake Allen from injury, he felt that the trade would give Hammond more opportunity to continue in the NHL. Hammond finished out the season with the Devils, but he would later reveal that an ankle injury acquired while in Montreal continued to affect him, and he left the team following the season's end.

On September 16, 2022, he signed a one-year contract with Traktor Chelyabinsk of the Kontinental Hockey League (KHL). Hammond's tenure in the KHL was brief, appearing in two games with Traktor in the 2022–23 season before opting to terminate his contract in order to return to North America on October 20, 2022. On December 19, Hammond announced his retirement from professional hockey, saying "my career was a series of unbelievable and unexpected memories. I met some of the best people I know and I can honestly say I had the best 'job' in the world."

== Post-retirement career ==
After retirement, Hammond transitioned to working in medical sales. On March 1, 2025, Hammond returned to Ottawa and was honoured with a ceremonial puck drop on the 10-year anniversary of his run.

== Personal life ==
Hammond was born in White Rock, British Columbia to Marshall and Sandie Hammond, and grew up in adjacent Surrey. He has a brother, Matt, and a sister, Christine.

Hammond has said that he almost quit hockey on two separate occasions, the first when he was cut after a junior A game in the 2006–07 season, and the second when he was traded from the BCHL's Surrey Eagles mid-season in 2007–08.

Hammond lives outside Detroit, Michigan with his wife and three children.

== Career statistics ==
			Regular season									Playoffs
Season	Team	League	GP	W	L	OTL	MIN	GA	SO	GAA	SV%	GP	W	L	MIN	GA	SO	GAA	SV%
2006–07	Westside Warriors	BCHL	1	0	1	0	34	4	0	7.06	.636	—	—	—	—	—	—	—	—
2006–07	Grandview Steelers	PJHL	28	17	5	3	1568	60	3	2.30	.930	16	9	7	988	44	1	2.67	.921
2007–08	Surrey Eagles	BCHL	32	15	14	1	1568	90	2	3.44	.898	—	—	—	—	—	—	—	—
2007–08	Vernon Vipers	BCHL	9	6	3	0	538	22	1	2.45	.901	7	3	3	412	20	0	2.91	.908
2008–09	Vernon Vipers	BCHL	43	27	12	1	2479	95	5	2.30	.912	17	12	5	1082	27	4	1.50	.946
2009–10	Bowling Green University	CCHA	19	0	12	2	837	60	0	4.30	.880	—	—	—	—	—	—	—	—
2010–11	Bowling Green University	CCHA	27	6	17	3	1528	68	2	2.67	.915	—	—	—	—	—	—	—	—
2011–12	Bowling Green University	CCHA	44	14	24	5	2615	119	2	2.73	.903	—	—	—	—	—	—	—	—
2012–13	Bowling Green Falcons	CCHA	29	10	15	3	1625	67	3	2.47	.917	—	—	—	—	—	—	—	—
2013–14	Binghamton Senators	AHL	48	25	19	3	2733	128	1	2.81	.910	4	1	3	265	13	0	2.95	.891
2013–14	Ottawa Senators	NHL	1	0	0	0	35	0	0	0.00	1.000	—	—	—	—	—	—	—	—
2014–15	Binghamton Senators	AHL	25	7	13	2	1369	80	2	3.51	.898	—	—	—	—	—	—	—	—
2014–15	Ottawa Senators	NHL	24	20	1	2	1411	42	3	1.79	.941	2	0	2	122	7	0	3.44	.914
2015–16	Ottawa Senators	NHL	24	7	11	4	1375	61	1	2.65	.914	—	—	—	—	—	—	—	—
2015–16	Binghamton Senators	AHL	2	0	2	0	119	8	0	4.05	.864	—	—	—	—	—	—	—	—
2016–17	Ottawa Senators	NHL	6	0	2	0	206	14	0	4.08	.837	—	—	—	—	—	—	—	—
2016–17	Binghamton Senators	AHL	5	2	3	0	297	16	0	3.24	.884	—	—	—	—	—	—	—	—
2017–18	Belleville Senators	AHL	18	8	6	2	987	55	0	3.34	.900	—	—	—	—	—	—	—	—
2017–18	San Antonio Rampage	AHL	1	1	0	0	60	1	0	1.00	.969	—	—	—	—	—	—	—	—
2017–18	Colorado Avalanche	NHL	1	0	1	0	59	2	0	2.07	.939	3	1	1	138	6	0	2.63	.933
2018–19	Iowa Wild	AHL	33	19	12	2	1988	93	3	2.81	.910	11	5	6	683	28	2	2.46	.912
2019–20	Rochester Americans	AHL	33	16	12	3	1923	81	4	2.53	.908	—	—	—	—	—	—	—	—
2021–22	Iowa Wild	AHL	11	6	2	3	664	27	3	2.44	.908	—	—	—	—	—	—	—	—
2021–22	Montreal Canadiens	NHL	4	3	0	0	201	8	0	2.40	.920	—	—	—	—	—	—	—	—
2021–22	New Jersey Devils	NHL	7	1	5	1	386	30	0	4.66	.860	—	—	—	—	—	—	—	—
2022–23	Traktor Chelyabinsk	KHL	2	0	2	0	97	7	0	4.33	.851	—	—	—	—	—	—	—	—
NHL totals			67	31	20	7	3,679	157	4	2.56	.916	5	1	3	260	13	0	3.00	.924

== Awards and records ==
- First goalie in NHL history to earn 21 wins in his first 27 games.
- First goaltender in Ottawa history to win first five starts of his career.
- One of two goalies in NHL history to allow two goals or fewer in their first 12 career starts. The first was Frank Brimsek for the 1938-39 Boston Bruins.
- March 2, 2015 - NHL First Star of the Week.
- March 2015 - NHL First Star of the Month

Source: AHL
