= 2008 Fred Page Cup Playoffs =

The Official Logo for the 2008 BCHL Fred Page Cup Playoffs.

The 2008 Fred Page Cup Playoffs of the British Columbia Hockey League began on February 29, 2008. The top two teams in each of the Coastal and Interior Conferences received a bye into the conference semifinals. The remaining eight teams that qualified, four from each conference, played a best-of-5 series elimination round. For the conference semifinals and finals, play reverted to a best-of-7 series. The conference champions played a best-of-7 series for the Fred Page Cup.

== Playoff seeds ==
After the 2007-08 BCHL season, 12 teams qualified for the playoffs. The Nanaimo Clippers were the Coastal Conference regular season champions and were also the BCHL regular season winners with the best record at 88 points. The Penticton Vees earned the Interior Conference regular season crown with 86 points, and won the Fred Page Cup Final 4-0.

=== Coastal Conference ===
1. Nanaimo Clippers - Coastal Conference and BCHL regular season champion; 88 points
2. Langley Chiefs - 72 points
3. Surrey Eagles - 70 points
4. Burnaby Express - 69 points
5. Victoria Grizzlies - 68 points
6. Powell River Kings - 63 points

=== Interior Conference ===
1. Penticton Vees - Interior Conference regular season champion; 86 points
2. Westside Warriors - 83 points
3. Salmon Arm Silverbacks - 80 points
4. Vernon Vipers - 76 points
5. Trail Smoke Eaters - 53 points
6. Prince George Spruce Kings - 52 points

== Playoff Bracket ==
Elimination Round
3	Surrey Eagles	1
6	Powell River Kings	3
4	Burnaby Express	2
5	Victoria Grizzlies	3
3	Salmon Arm Silverbacks	3
6	Prince George	1
4	Vernon Vipers	3
5	Trail Smoke Eaters	0

Conference Semifinals
1	Nanaimo Clippers	4
6	Powell River Kings	0
Coastal Conference
2	Langley Chiefs	4
5	Victoria Grizzlies	2
1	Penticton Vees	4
4	Vernon Vipers	3
Interior Conference
2	Westside Warriors	4
3	Salmon Arm Silverbacks	3

Conference Finals
1	Nanaimo Clippers	4
2	Langley Chiefs	2
1	Penticton Vees	4
2	Westside Warriors	0

Fred Page Cup Finals
1	Nanaimo Clippers	0
1	Penticton Vees	4

In each round, the highest remaining seed in each conference is matched against the lowest remaining seed. The higher-seeded team is awarded home ice advantage, which gives them a maximum possible four games on their home ice, with the other team getting a maximum possible three. The opening elimination round follows a best-of-five 2-2-1 format. Each best-of-seven series follows a 2–2–1–1–1 format. This means that the higher-seeded team will have Games 1 and 2, plus 5 and 7 if necessary, played on their home ice, while the lower-seeded team will be at home for the other games. The format ensures that the team with home ice advantage will always have home ice for the "extra" game if there are an odd number of games in a series.

== Statistical leaders ==
=== Points ===
Note: GP = Games played; G = Goals; A = Assists; Pts = Points; PIM = Penalty minutes

Player	Team	GP	G	A	Pts	PIM
AJ Gale	Nanaimo Clippers	14	8	18	26	13
Austin Smith	Penticton Vees	15	11	11	22	12
Mikael Bedard	Nanaimo Clippers	12	8	13	21	14
Andrew Cherniwchan	Nanaimo Clippers	13	8	11	19	16
Brodie Zuk	Nanaimo Clippers	14	8	11	19	25
Denver Manderson	Penticton Vees	15	6	13	19	9
Brian Nugent	Victoria Grizzlies	11	8	9	17	22
Zac Dalpe	Penticton Vees	15	8	9	17	4
Clinton Pettapiece	Westside Warriors	11	4	13	17	14
Jonathan Milhouse	Victoria Grizzlies	11	6	10	16	6

=== Leading goaltenders ===
Note: GP = Games played; TOI = Time on ice (minutes); W = Wins; L = Losses; T = Ties; GA = Goals against; SO = Shutouts; Sv% = Save percentage; GAA = Goals against average

Player	Team	GP	TOI	W	L	T	GA	SO	Sv%	GAA
Paul Kolida	Victoria Grizzlies	3	162	1	1	0	6	0	.926	2.23
Lucas Gore	Vernon Vipers	4	193	3	1	0	8	0	.895	2.48
Alex Evin	Penticton Vees	15	890	12	3	0	37	2	.912	2.49
Stephen Caple	Westside Warriors	10	516	3	5	0	23	0	.896	2.68
Tommy Tartaglione	Surrey Eagles	4	197	1	3	0	9	0	.916	2.73
