= Ferrar Fenton Bible =

1903 modern English translation of the bible

- Full name: The Holy Bible in Modern English
- Abbreviation: FF
- Complete Bible published: 1903
- Translation type: literal
- Copyright: Public domain
- Genesis 1:1–3 By Periods GOD created that which produced the Solar Systems; then that which produced the Earth. But the Earth was unorganized and empty; and darkness covered its convulsed surface; while the breath of GOD rocked the surface of its waters. God then said, "Let there be light;" and light came. John 3:16 For God so loved the world that He gave the only-begotten Son, so that every one believing in Him should not be lost, but have eternal life.

The Holy Bible in Modern English, commonly known as the Ferrar Fenton Bible, was an early translation of the Bible into English as spoken and written in the 19th and 20th centuries.

== Origins ==
Believing the Christian faith would be lost unless a modern English version of the Bible were produced, London businessman Ferrar Fenton (1832–1920) began working on a translation of the Bible in 1853. He published his translation of Paul's epistles in 1883 and other parts of the Bible in years following. The complete Bible was first published in 1903, with revisions published in subsequent years until 1910.

Fenton spent approximately fifty years working on his translation, with the goal "to study the Bible absolutely in its original languages, to ascertain what its writers actually said and thought."

Fenton had acquired a learning and understanding of ancient Sanskrit, Greek, Hebrew and Latin through being a distinguished member of the Royal Asiatic Society. As a tradesman, he also had access to numerous ancient Septuagint and Masoretic manuscripts to aid in translation. Fenton also used Brian Walton's Polygot Bible (1657) for minimal referencing.

== Translation ==
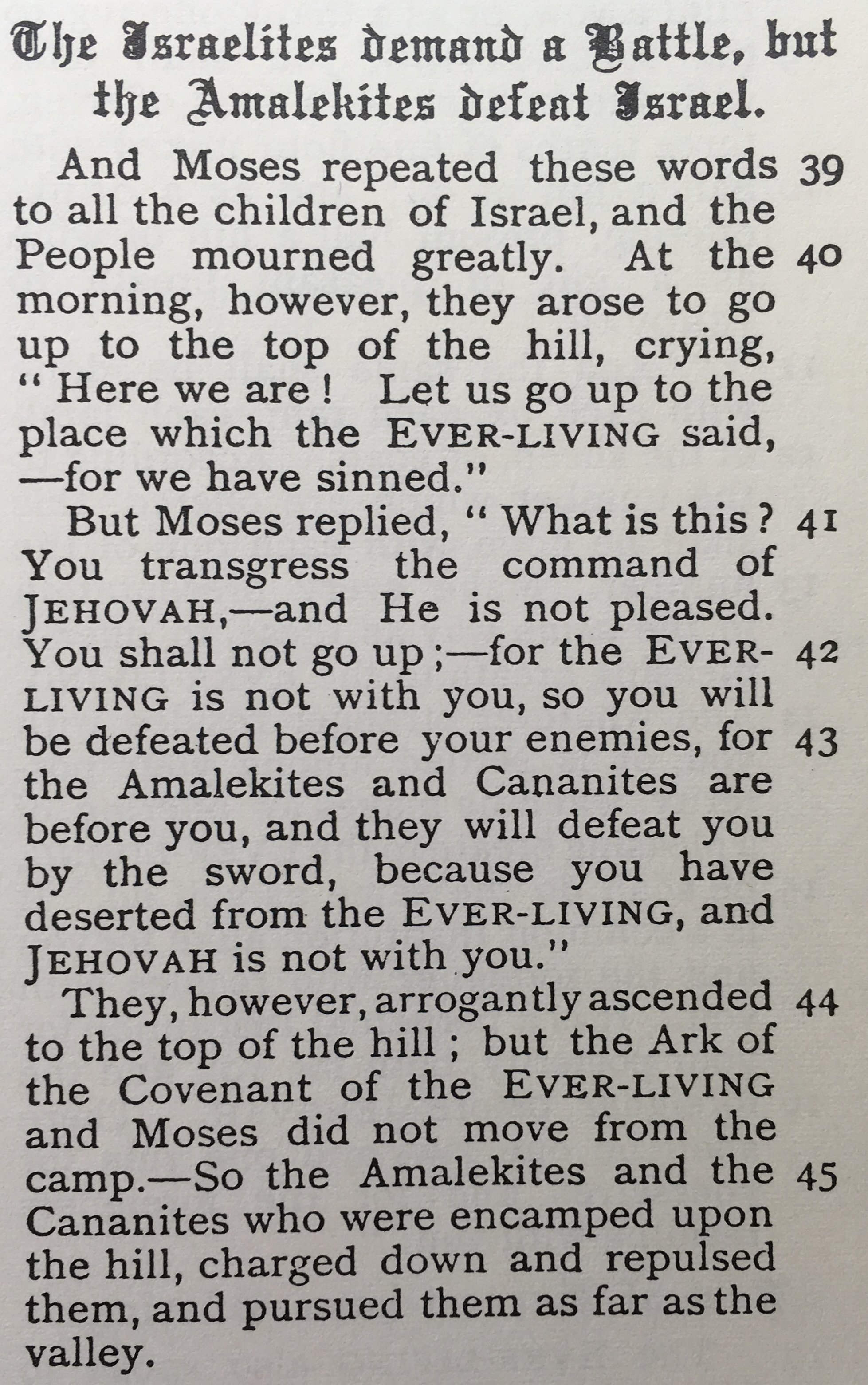
Sample from Numbers 14, showing that his translations of the tetragrammaton varied, using both "Ever-living" as well as "Jehovah"

The translation is noted for a rearranging of the books of the Bible into what Fenton believed was the correct chronological order. In the Old Testament, this order follows that of the Hebrew Bible. The name of God was translated throughout the Old Testament as "The EVER-LIVING", but to a lesser degree as "LORD" and to a much lesser degree as "JEHOVAH" (such as in Numbers chapter 15). The Bible is described as "translated into English direct from the original Hebrew, Chaldee, and Greek languages." For his translation of the Book of Job which appeared in 1898, Fenton was assisted by Henrik Borgström. This was "rendered into the same metre as the original Hebrew, word by word and line by line." His translation of the New Testament is based on the Greek text of Westcott and Hort and was approved by many professors and theologians (Fenton's translation, 9th edition, 1905, includes an added page listing these exact authorities).

The ordering novelty in the New Testament is that it places the Gospel of John and the First Epistle of John at the beginning before the Gospel of Matthew, thus placing the Acts of the Apostles immediately after the Gospel of Luke. Fenton included an introductory note to explain this ordering which reads:

(1) This Gospel is specially the Doctrinal Record of our Lord's life. The Great Teacher has here elaborated the thought and purpose of God concerning His plan of salvation by a Gift, and upon this basis have been formulated and propagated the doctrines of the Christian faith. The record should therefore precede the Historical Narratives.

(2) There is ample reason for believing that the Gospel of John was written at an earlier date than those of the other three Evangelists.

Also notable is Ferrar Fenton's restoration of the Psalms into the musical verse form as close to the original as he could get. The Psalms were, quite literally, songs complete with instructions for the "choirmaster" as well as descriptions of the appropriate musical instruments to be used. His translations of Psalms 23, 48, and 137 are still sung in churches today, albeit to tunes not the original.

Ferrar Fenton's Bible is most well known for its translation of Jonah 2:1 which translates the fish (or whale) as a nickname for a ship or man made sea vessel and not as a literal whale or sea-creature. Fenton also included a footnote explaining how he restored this passage to what he believed its correct meaning. Fenton inserted his assumed dates for various sections. His method resulted in Samson's relationship with Delilah spanning the time from "B.C. 1138" to "B.C. 1121", in Judges 16:4-22.

Fenton included footnotes at the bottom of many pages of his translation to aid the reader on linguistic or historical matters, as well as to offer his personal opinion on certain topics. For example, a lengthy note was added to the end of Genesis 11 which explains Fenton's own solution to the problem of the patriarchs' great ages. Fenton wrote "we may safely conclude that the patriarchs of such apparently incredible length of life were actually priest-chiefs of tribes, whose souls were believed to have passed from the first organizer of the tribe." Fenton believed that the great longevity of the patriarchs can be explained if those names were tribal house or clan appellations.

Fenton believed that the Greek text of the Gospel of John is "a translation of an original Hebrew work of the Apostle into Greek", according to a footnote at the end of 1 John.

== Popularity ==
At least 10 editions of Fenton's translation were published in his own lifetime. He also continued to add extra notes to these editions up to 1910. An abridged version was published in 1935 and reprinted in 1951 by Covenant Publishing under the title The Command of the Ever-Living.

Although Ferrar Fenton's translation never achieved great popularity and fell into obscurity, it remains in print today. It is now published by Destiny Publishers of Merrimac, Massachusetts, where it is also available to download as a separate PDF file for each book of the Bible.

== British Israelism ==
Ferrar Fenton was a British Israelite and he dedicated his translation to "all those nations who have sprung from the race of the British Isles." An explanatory note in the abridged version The Command of the Ever-Living quotes a letter Fenton wrote in 1910 describing his belief that the Welsh language sprung from ancient Hebrew and that the British were descended from Shem.

Some modern branches of British Israelism use the Ferrar Fenton translation.

== See also ==
- Modern English Bible translations
- Weymouth New Testament
- Twentieth Century New Testament
- Moffatt, New Translation
