= Richard Francis Weymouth =

English schoolmaster and Bible student (1822–1902)

Dr. Richard Francis Weymouth (M.A., D.Litt.) (1822–1902) was an English schoolmaster, Baptist layman and Bible student known particularly for producing one of the earliest modern language translations of the New Testament.

== Life ==
Born near Devonport, Devon, he was the son of Richard Weymouth and his wife Ann Sprague. He was educated at University College London. He taught at a private school in Surrey before being appointed headmaster of Mill Hill School in 1869, when Thomas Scrutton and his supporters formed a new trust to reopen and revive the school, which had closed the previous year. Weymouth was also a fellow of University College London from 1869, and taught there until 1886, before retiring in 1891 to devote himself to textual criticism and Bible study. He died in 1902.

== Works ==
Weymouth's first important work was The Resultant Greek Testament, an eclectic text based on the work of the most prominent textual critics of the eighteenth and nineteenth centuries. His major publication was The Modern Speech New Testament, known as the Weymouth New Testament, edited by his secretary, Ernest Hampden-Cook, and published in 1903 in New York and London, England. Weymouth wanted to produce a version that ordinary people could read. It renders Greek idioms into modern English. He also published A literal translation of Cynewulf's Elene from Zupitza's text (1888), based on Cynewulfs Elene mit einem Glossar by German philologist Julius Zupitza.
