= 2007–08 BCHL season =

- League: British Columbia Hockey League
- Sport: Ice hockey
- Duration: Regular season September - February; Playoffs; February - April
- Teams: 17

Fred Page Cup
- League champions: Penticton Vees
- Runners-up: Nanaimo Clippers

Doyle Cup
- Western Canada champions: Camrose Kodiaks
- Western Canada runners-up: Penticton Vees

BCHL seasons
- ← 2006–07 2008–09 →

The 2007–08 BCHL season is the 46th season of the British Columbia Hockey League (BCHL). It began on September 7, 2007, and ran through February 27, 2008, followed by the Fred Page Cup Playoffs, ending in April, 2008. On February 28, the league announced a partnership with INSINC to live video stream the 2008 playoffs.

== Final regular season statistics ==
=== Conference standings ===
Note: GP = Games played; W = Wins; L = Losses; T = Ties; OTL = Overtime losses; GF = Goals for; GA = Goals against; PTS = Points; Top six teams in each conference qualified for post-season playoffs.

==== Interior Conference ====
	GP	W	L	T	OTL	PTS	GF	GA
y-Penticton Vees	60	41	15	2	2	86	235	146
x-Westside Warriors	60	40	17	0	3	83	237	161
x-Salmon Arm Silverbacks	60	37	17	3	3	80	256	201
x-Vernon Vipers	60	36	20	2	2	76	238	185
x-Trail Smoke Eaters	60	23	30	1	6	53	169	213
x-Prince George Spruce Kings	60	21	29	1	9	52	178	235
e-Quesnel Millionaires	60	19	36	0	5	43	175	254
e-Merritt Centennials	60	13	38	1	8	35	156	305

x - clinched playoff spot, y - clinched division title, e - eliminated from playoff contention

==== Coastal Conference ====
	GP	W	L	T	OTL	PTS	GF	GA
y-Nanaimo Clippers	60	42	14	0	4	88	249	155
x-Langley Chiefs	60	33	21	0	6	72	257	234
x-Surrey Eagles	60	33	23	1	3	70	234	213
x-Burnaby Express	60	33	24	0	3	69	218	219
x-Victoria Grizzlies	60	30	22	3	5	68	204	189
x-Powell River Kings	60	26	23	1	10	63	209	217
e-Cowichan Valley Capitals	60	27	28	2	3	59	200	200
e-Alberni Valley Bulldogs	60	17	39	1	3	34	171	259

x - clinched playoff spot, y - clinched division title, e - eliminated from playoff contention

Map of BCHL, 2007–08
Coastal Division
Interior Division

=== Scoring leaders ===
Note: GP = Games played; G = Goals; A = Assists; Pts = Points; PIM = Penalty minutes

As of February 28, 2008

Player	Team	GP	G	A	Pts	PIM
Carlo Finucci	Burnaby Express	60	33	69	102	54
Clinton Pettapiece	Westside Warriors	58	35	63	98	89
Hunter Bishop	Vernon Vipers	60	57	40	97	45
Scott Knowles	Surrey Eagles	60	26	64	90	24
Brodie Reid	Burnaby Express	60	52	35	87	37
Cody Campbell	Burnaby Express	60	32	55	87	40
Jordy Christian	Prince George Spruce Kings	60	39	43	82	71
Taylor Stefishen	Langley Chiefs	57	33	48	81	71
Clay Harvey	Powell River Kings	55	37	43	80	37
Derek Lee	Salmon Arm Silverbacks	52	21	56	77	35

==== Leading goaltenders ====
Note: GP = Games played; TOI = Time on ice (minutes); W = Wins; L = Losses; T = Ties; GA = Goals against; SO = Shutouts; Sv% = Save percentage; GAA = Goals against average

As of February 28, 2008

Player	Team	GP	TOI	W	L	T	GA	SO	Sv%	GAA
Nathan Lieuwen	Westside Warriors	13	710	9	2	0	23	0	.931	1.94
Alex Evin	Penticton Vees	43	2,449	31	10	1	90	4	.921	2.20
Michael Garman	Nanaimo Clippers	35	2,013	23	11	0	84	3	.924	2.50
Stephen Caple	Westside Warriors	40	2,310	26	14	0	102	1	.900	2.65
Evan Smith	Nanaimo Clippers	28	1,605	19	7	0	71	2	.898	2.65

== Playoff seeds ==
After the 2007–08 BCHL regular season, the standard of 12 teams qualified for the playoffs.

=== Coastal Conference ===
1. Nanaimo Clippers - Coastal Conference and BCHL regular season champion; 88 points
2. Langley Chiefs - 72 points
3. Surrey Eagles - 70 points
4. Burnaby Express - 69 points
5. Victoria Grizzlies - 68 points
6. Powell River Kings - 63 points

=== Interior Conference ===
1. Penticton Vees - Interior Conference regular season champion; 86 points
2. Westside Warriors - 83 points
3. Salmon Arm Silverbacks - 80 points
4. Vernon Vipers - 76 points
5. Trail Smoke Eaters - 53 points
6. Prince George Spruce Kings - 52 points

== Playoff Bracket ==
Elimination Round
3	Surrey Eagles	1
6	Powell River Kings	3
4	Burnaby Express	2
5	Victoria Grizzlies	3
3	Salmon Arm Silverbacks	3
6	Prince George	1
4	Vernon Vipers	3
5	Trail Smoke Eaters	0

Conference Semifinals
1	Nanaimo Clippers	4
6	Powell River Kings	0
Coastal Conference
2	Langley Chiefs	4
5	Victoria Grizzlies	2
1	Penticton Vees	4
4	Vernon Vipers	3
Interior Conference
2	Westside Warriors	4
3	Salmon Arm Silverbacks	3

Conference Finals
1	Nanaimo Clippers	4
2	Langley Chiefs	2
1	Penticton Vees	4
2	Westside Warriors	0

Fred Page Cup Finals
1	Nanaimo Clippers	0
1	Penticton Vees	4

In each round, the highest remaining seed in each conference is matched against the lowest remaining seed. The higher-seeded team is awarded home ice advantage, which gives them a maximum possible four games on their home ice, with the other team getting a maximum possible three. The opening elimination round follows a best-of-five 2-2-1 format. Each best-of-seven series follows a 2–2–1–1–1 format. This means that the higher-seeded team will have Games 1 and 2, plus 5 and 7 if necessary, played on their home ice, while the lower-seeded team will be at home for the other games. The format ensures that the team with home ice advantage will always have home ice for the "extra" game if there are an odd number of games in a series.

== All Star Game ==
The BCHL All-Star Game was played at the Bear Mountain Arena in Victoria, British Columbia on January 23, 2008. The Coastal Conference All-Stars won the game 15–9.

	Coastal Conference All-Stars	Interior Conference All-Stars
Starters:	F Scott Knowles (Surrey Eagles); F Carlo Finucci (Burnaby Express); F Eric Filiou (Nanaimo Clippers); D Jordie Benn (Victoria Grizzlies); D Matt Irwin (Nanaimo Clippers); G Michael Garman (Nanaimo Clippers)	F Hunter Bishop (Vernon Vipers); F Zac Dalpe (Penticton Vees); F Jordy Christian (Prince George Spruce Kings); D Zac Josepher (Penticton Vees); D Ryan DeVries (Prince George Spruce Kings); G Alex Evin (Penticton Vees)
Reserves:	D Brad Hunt (Burnaby Express); D Nolan Julseth-White (Langley Chiefs); F Clinton Pettapiece (Cowichan Valley Capitals); F Russell Goodman (Nanaimo Clippers); D Chris Ickert (Langley Chiefs); F Brodie Reid (Burnaby Express); F Taylor Stefishen (Langley Chiefs); F Mikael Bedard (Nanaimo Clippers); D Phil Magistrale (Surrey Eagles); F Clay Harvey (Powell River Kings); G Chris Rawlings (Powell River Kings); G Matthew Wong (Victoria Grizzlies); F Brooks Robinson (Cowichan Valley Capitals); F Daniel Moriarty (Alberni Valley Bulldogs); F Derek Grant (Langley Chiefs)	G Damien Ketlo (Prince George Spruce Kings); D Damon Kipp (Salmon Arm Silverbacks); D Jeff Forsythe (Prince George Spruce Kings); F Denver Manderson (Penticton Vees); D Michael Glacair (Salmon Arm Silverbacks); F Derek Lee (Salmon Arm Silverbacks); F Austin Smith (Penticton Vees); F David Arduin (Trail Smoke Eaters); F John Williams (Quesnel Millionaires); D Justin Schultz (Westside Warriors); F Kevin Walrod (Westside Warriors); F Erick Ruud (Merritt Centennials); G Shane Mainprize (Merritt Centennials); D Derrick Walser (Toronto Marlies); F Trevor Bailey (Westside Warriors); F Kevin Limbert (Trail Smoke Eaters)
