= Brad Hunt (ice hockey) =

Canadian ice hockey player (born 1988)

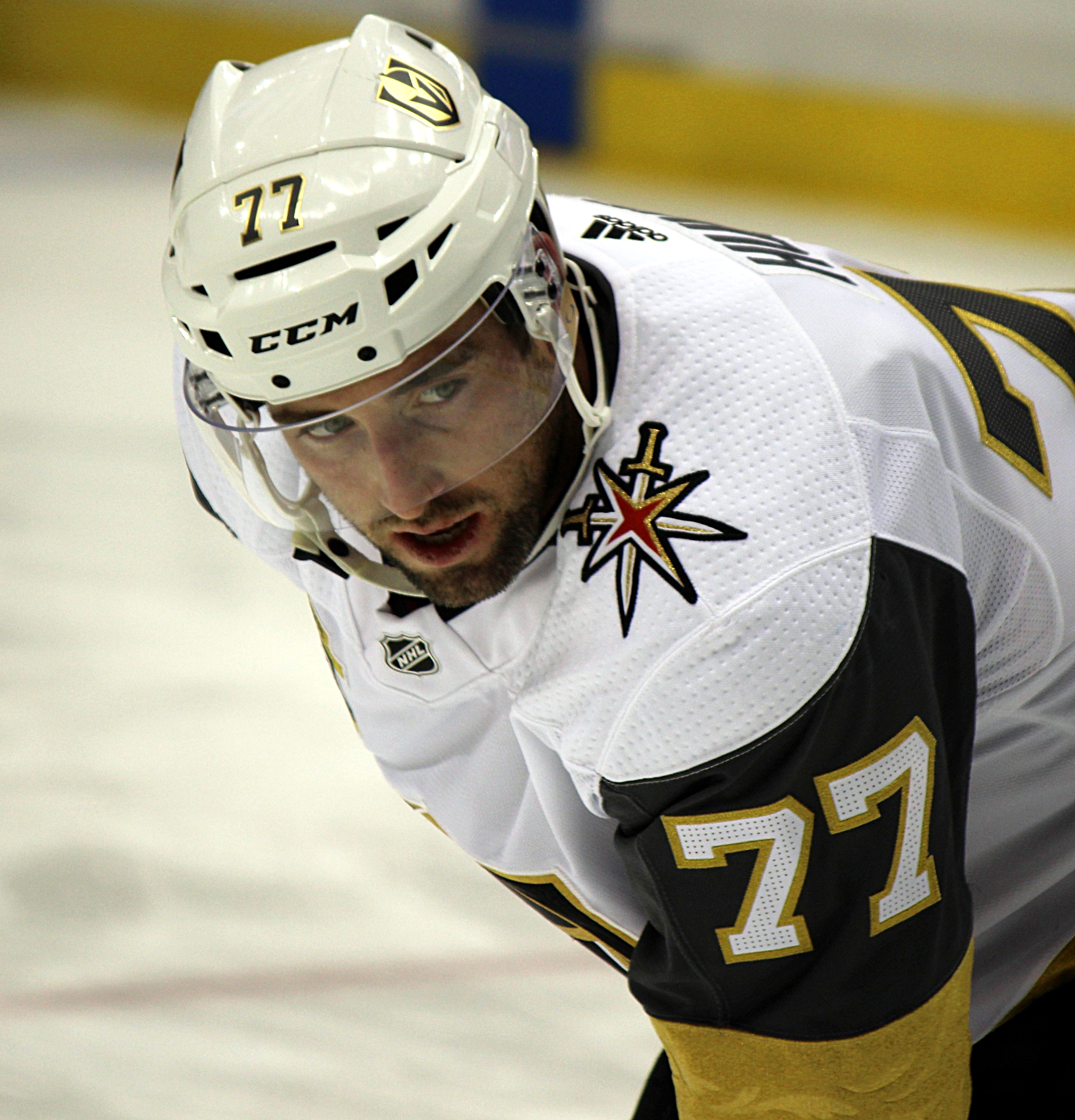
- Hunt with the Vegas Golden Knights in 2018
- Born: August 24, 1988 (age 37) Maple Ridge, British Columbia, Canada
- Height: 5 ft 9 in (175 cm)
- Weight: 187 lb (85 kg; 13 st 5 lb)
- Position: Defence
- Shot: Left
- Played for: Edmonton Oilers; St. Louis Blues; Nashville Predators; Vegas Golden Knights; Minnesota Wild; Vancouver Canucks; Colorado Avalanche; Vaasan Sport
- National team: Canada
- NHL draft: Undrafted
- Playing career: 2012–2026

Bradley Michael Hunt (born August 24, 1988) is a Canadian former professional ice hockey defenceman. He played in the National Hockey League (NHL) with the Edmonton Oilers, St. Louis Blues, Nashville Predators, Vegas Golden Knights, Minnesota Wild, Vancouver Canucks and Colorado Avalanche. Hunt beginning his professional career in the American Hockey League (AHL) with the Chicago Wolves, where he was an All-Star in the 2012–13 season. He is considered undersized for a defenseman, but is known for possessing a hard slapshot.

Prior to turning professional, Hunt played college hockey with the Bemidji State Beavers. While there, he helped them to two NCAA tournaments, including a Cinderella run to the Frozen Four in 2009. He also earned multiple individual honours during his time at Bemidji State and left as the Beaver's all-time leader in defenseman scoring and defenseman power play goals. As a junior ice hockey player, Hunt was a member of the Burnaby Express team that won the 2006 Royal Bank Cup as Canadian junior A champions. He was twice named the team's Most Outstanding Defensemen. Internationally, Hunt has represented Canada on one occasion, winning a gold medal at the 2023 IIHF World Championship.

== Early life ==
Hunt was born on August 24, 1988, in Maple Ridge, British Columbia, to Steve and Tricia Hunt. He has a younger sister, Brittany. As a child Steve, a former Senior AA goaltender, set up a deck for Brad to shoot pucks from in the family's backyard. Growing up, he was best friends with Victor Bartley, who also plays professional hockey.

== Playing career ==
=== Amateur ===
Hunt began playing in the Ridge Meadows Minor Hockey Association at the atom level. He began as a forward but in pee-wee he switched to defence to gain more playing time. He played two years of midget AAA then made the junior B Ridge Meadows Flames in the Pacific Junior Hockey League (PJHL) as a sixteen-year-old. In his first year with the Flames, he was named the team's Rookie of the Year and played in the PJHL All-Star and Prospect Game. During the season, he was called up to the junior A Burnaby Express in the British Columbia Hockey League (BCHL). He played just three games for the Express and an additional two playoff games. That said, he was with the team when they won the 2006 Royal Bank Cup as Canadian junior A champions. He stayed with the Express the following season and played in 60 games scoring 4 goals and 38 points and added another 8 points in 14 playoff games. For his efforts, he was named the team's Most Outstanding Defenceman. In the 2007–08 season, his final with the team, he increased his offensive production to 16 goals and 55 points and played in the BCHL All-Star Game. He was again named the team's Most Outstanding Defenceman, while the Express Lost in Round 1 in 5 Games against the Victoria Grizzlies.

Following his third season in junior, Hunt attended Bemidji State University (BSU). While there, he played with the Bemidji State Beavers, in the National Collegiate Athletic Association (NCAA) Division I. In his first season with the Beavers, Hunt scored 9 goals and 32 points in 33 games. BSU won the College Hockey America (CHA) tournament with Hunt being named to the CHA All-Tournament Team. By winning the tournament, Bemidji State earned an automatic bid to the 2009 NCAA Division I Men's Ice Hockey Tournament. The Beavers entered the tournament as the lowest seeded team and matched up with Notre Dame. BSU upset the Fighting Irish and proceed to defeat Cornell University, advancing to the Frozen Four. With the wins, Bemidji State became the first number 16 seed to make the Frozen Four, and the first team to ever make the Frozen Four from outside college hockey's top four conferences. Their Cinderella run ended with a 4–1 loss to Miami University. Hunt was named to the NCAA Midwest Regional All-Tournament Team. At the end of the season, he was also named to the All-CHA Rookie Team, All-CHA First Team, and named CHA Rookie of the Year.

In his second season, Hunt's goal production dipped slightly to 7, but he increased his assist total to 26. His assist total was one shy of tying the school's Division I single season record held by Luke Erickson. At the end of the season, he was again named to the All-CHA First Team. In the 2010 CHA Tournament, the top-ranked Beavers were upset by Niagara University in the first round and later tied Robert Morris University in the consolation game. Though they failed to capture the automatic bid for the 2010 NCAA Division I Men's Ice Hockey Tournament, BSU received an at-large bit thanks in part to a school record 22 consecutive weeks of being ranked in the top 15. The Beavers lost in the first round of the tournament to the University of Michigan.

For the 2010–11 season, Bemidji State moved from the CHA to the Western Collegiate Hockey Association (WCHA). Hunt's point production dropped in the new conference as he registered 3 goals and 21 points. He stated that part of reason for the drop in production was teams recognizing his shooting ability and preventing him from getting shots off. While his individual numbers were lower, he was the quarterback of one of the conference's top power plays. In the 2011 WCHA Tournament, the Beavers advanced to the semifinals where they were defeated by the University of Denver. In his senior season, Hunt was named one of the team's alternate captains. He increased his production in the WCHA, scoring 5 goals and 26 points while reducing his penalty minutes (PIMs) to a career low 8. In the 2012 WCHA Tournament, Bemidji State lost in the first round to University of North Dakota. By finishing his Bemidji State career with 112 points, Hunt became just the sixth defenceman in school history to eclipse the 100 point mark and left as the Beaver's all-time leader in defenceman scoring and defenceman power play goals.

=== Professional ===
Undrafted out of college, Hunt signed an amateur tryout contract with the American Hockey League's (AHL) Chicago Wolves, where his first head coach was Craig MacTavish. He scored his first professional goal on March 29, 2012, in a game against the Abbotsford Heat in front of 40 friends and family members. He played 14 games for Chicago, registering one goal and five points. He remained with the Wolves for the Calder Cup playoffs, playing in 5 games scoring 1 goal and 5 points as the Wolves lost in the first round to the San Antonio Rampage. In the off-season, the Wolves signed Hunt to a standard player contract. In his first full professional season, Hunt was named to the 2013 AHL All-Star Game, replacing the injured Brett Sterling as the Wolves' representative. At the time of the announcement, Hunt was Chicago's leading scorer among defenceman. At the All-Star skills competition, he participated in three events; Puck Control Relay, Hardest Shot, and Breakaway Relay. He finished third in the Hardest Shot competition recording a 99.5 miles per hour (mph) shot. In the game, Hunt scored a first period goal helping the Western Conference to a 7–6 victory. He finished the season with 4 goals and 33 points as the Wolves missed the playoffs.

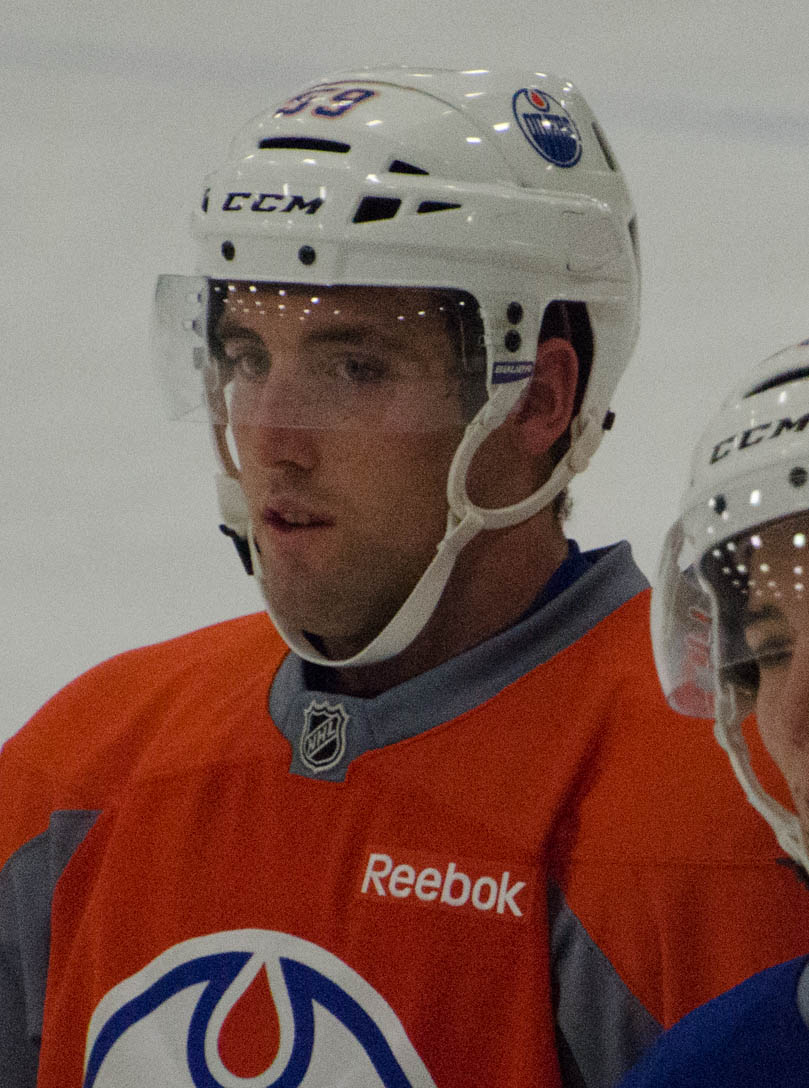
Hunt in 2014 with the Edmonton Oilers

In the off-season, Hunt signed a two-year entry-level contract with the Edmonton Oilers, for whom MacTavish had become the general manager. He attended Oilers training camp and in his first preseason game, Hunt registered two assists against the Vancouver Canucks. He failed to make the team out of camp and was assigned to the Oilers AHL affiliate, the Oklahoma City Barons. Hunt played 29 games for the Barons, scoring 3 goals and 15 points, leading the Oklahoma City defence in scoring. After the Oilers suffered some injuries on the back-end, he was called up to Edmonton. He made his NHL debut on January 3, 2014, in a game against the Anaheim Ducks. Hunt played 10:53 and finished as a –1 in the game. He played in two more games before being reassigned to Oklahoma City.

On July 2, 2016, Hunt effectively made a return to the Chicago Wolves, in agreeing as a free agent to a one-year, two-way contract with the St. Louis Blues. In the 2016–17 season, Hunt excelled with the Wolves, leading the league in scoring, as a defenceman, through 23 games. He was recalled by the Blues and despite making an immediate impact, was later placed on waivers after 9 games on January 16, 2017. He was claimed the following day by the injury-depleted Nashville Predators.

On July 1, 2017, having left the Predators as a free agent, Hunt agreed to a two-year, one-way contract with expansion club, the Vegas Golden Knights. On January 21, 2019, after playing in 58 games for the Golden Knights, Hunt was traded to the Minnesota Wild along with a sixth round 2019 NHL entry draft draft pick in exchange for a 5th round pick in the 2019 Draft. He tallied 3 powerplay goals and added 5 points in 29 games from the blueline with the Wild, as the club missed the playoffs for the first time in 7 seasons.

On June 24, 2019, Hunt was signed to a two-year, $1.4 million contract extension to remain with the Wild.

After the better part of three seasons with the Wild, Hunt left the club as a free agent and was signed to a one-year, $800,000 contract with the Vancouver Canucks on July 28, 2021.

As a free agent from the Canucks, Hunt was signed to a two-year, two-way contract with the reigning Stanley Cup champions, the Colorado Avalanche, on July 15, 2022. After attending the Avalanche 2022 training camp, Hunt was placed on waivers and re-assigned to the begin the 2022–23 season with AHL affiliate, the Colorado Eagles. Adding a veteran presence to the depth on the blueline of the Avalanche organization, Hunt played in a top-pairing role with the Eagles and was leading the team in scoring with 20 points through only 22 games before he was recalled by the Avalanche on December 9, 2022. He immediately made his Avalanche debut in a 2-1 shootout defeat to the New York Rangers. He recorded his first goal with the Avalanche against former club, the Edmonton Oilers, in a 3-2 overtime victory on January 7, 2023. He was initially named as the Eagles representative to the AHL All-Star Classic, marking his sixth occasion, however remained with the Avalanche. Hunt added 6 points through 26 games with the Avalanche before he was placed on waivers due to the returning health of the blueline on February 11, 2023. Hunt made his return to the Colorado Eagles on February 17 after clearing waivers where he was named team captain.

On August 2, 2024, having concluded his two-year contract with the Avalanche, Hunt was signed as a free agent to a one-year AHL contract with the Hershey Bears. He was limited to just 41 regular season games through injury during his tenure with the Bears in the 2024–25 season, posting 4 goals and 19 points from the blueline.

As a free agent, Hunt following a 14 professional seasons in North America, opted to pursue a career abroad by agreeing to a one-year contract with Finnish club, Vaasan Sport of the Liiga on September 12, 2025. In the 2025–26 season, Hunt contributed with 7 goals and 25 points through 53 appearances from the blueline with Sport. Having concluded his contract with Sport, Hunt was confirmed to have left Sport on March 25, 2026.

On August 2, 2026, Hunt announced his retirement from hockey following a 14 year professional career.

== International play ==
Medal record

Representing Canada

Men's ice hockey

World Championships
Gold medal – first place	2023 Finland/Latvia	

On May 5, 2023, Hunt was named to Canada men's national ice hockey team at the 2023 IIHF World Championship where he recorded three assists in ten games and won a gold medal.

== Career statistics ==
=== Regular season and playoffs ===
			Regular season					Playoffs
Season	Team	League	GP	G	A	Pts	PIM	GP	G	A	Pts	PIM
2005–06	Ridge Meadows Flames	PIJHL	45	5	16	21	47	—	—	—	—	—
2005–06	Burnaby Express	BCHL	3	0	0	0	0	2	0	0	0	0
2006–07	Burnaby Express	BCHL	60	4	34	38	65	14	2	6	8	16
2007–08	Burnaby Express	BCHL	60	16	39	55	53	—	—	—	—	—
2008–09	Bemidji State University	CHA	37	9	23	32	24	—	—	—	—	—
2009–10	Bemidji State University	CHA	37	7	26	33	35	—	—	—	—	—
2010–11	Bemidji State University	WCHA	38	3	18	21	33	—	—	—	—	—
2011–12	Bemidji State University	WCHA	38	5	21	26	8	—	—	—	—	—
2011–12	Chicago Wolves	AHL	14	1	4	5	8	5	1	3	4	0
2012–13	Chicago Wolves	AHL	65	4	29	33	22	—	—	—	—	—
2013–14	Oklahoma City Barons	AHL	66	11	39	50	34	3	1	0	1	4
2013–14	Edmonton Oilers	NHL	3	0	0	0	0	—	—	—	—	—
2014–15	Edmonton Oilers	NHL	11	1	2	3	0	—	—	—	—	—
2014–15	Oklahoma City Barons	AHL	62	19	32	51	18	10	3	7	10	6
2015–16	Bakersfield Condors	AHL	57	13	28	41	18	—	—	—	—	—
2015–16	Edmonton Oilers	NHL	7	0	0	0	2	—	—	—	—	—
2016–17	Chicago Wolves	AHL	23	9	20	29	6	—	—	—	—	—
2016–17	St. Louis Blues	NHL	9	1	4	5	2	—	—	—	—	—
2016–17	Nashville Predators	NHL	3	0	1	1	0	—	—	—	—	—
2017–18	Vegas Golden Knights	NHL	45	3	15	18	6	—	—	—	—	—
2018–19	Vegas Golden Knights	NHL	13	2	5	7	2	—	—	—	—	—
2018–19	Minnesota Wild	NHL	29	3	2	5	6	—	—	—	—	—
2019–20	Minnesota Wild	NHL	59	8	11	19	6	4	0	0	0	2
2020–21	Minnesota Wild	NHL	12	1	0	1	4	—	—	—	—	—
2021–22	Vancouver Canucks	NHL	50	3	14	17	12	—	—	—	—	—
2022–23	Colorado Eagles	AHL	24	7	14	21	12	2	0	1	1	2
2022–23	Colorado Avalanche	NHL	47	4	6	10	12	1	0	0	0	0
2023–24	Colorado Eagles	AHL	70	16	33	49	41	3	1	2	3	0
2024–25	Hershey Bears	AHL	41	4	15	19	10	2	0	1	1	0
2025–26	Vaasan Sport	Liiga	53	7	18	25	30	—	—	—	—	—
NHL totals			288	26	60	86	52	5	0	0	0	2

=== International ===
Year	Team	Event	Result	GP	G	A	Pts	PIM
2023	Canada	WC	1st place, gold medalist(s)	10	0	3	3	4
Senior totals				10	0	3	3	4

== Awards and honours ==
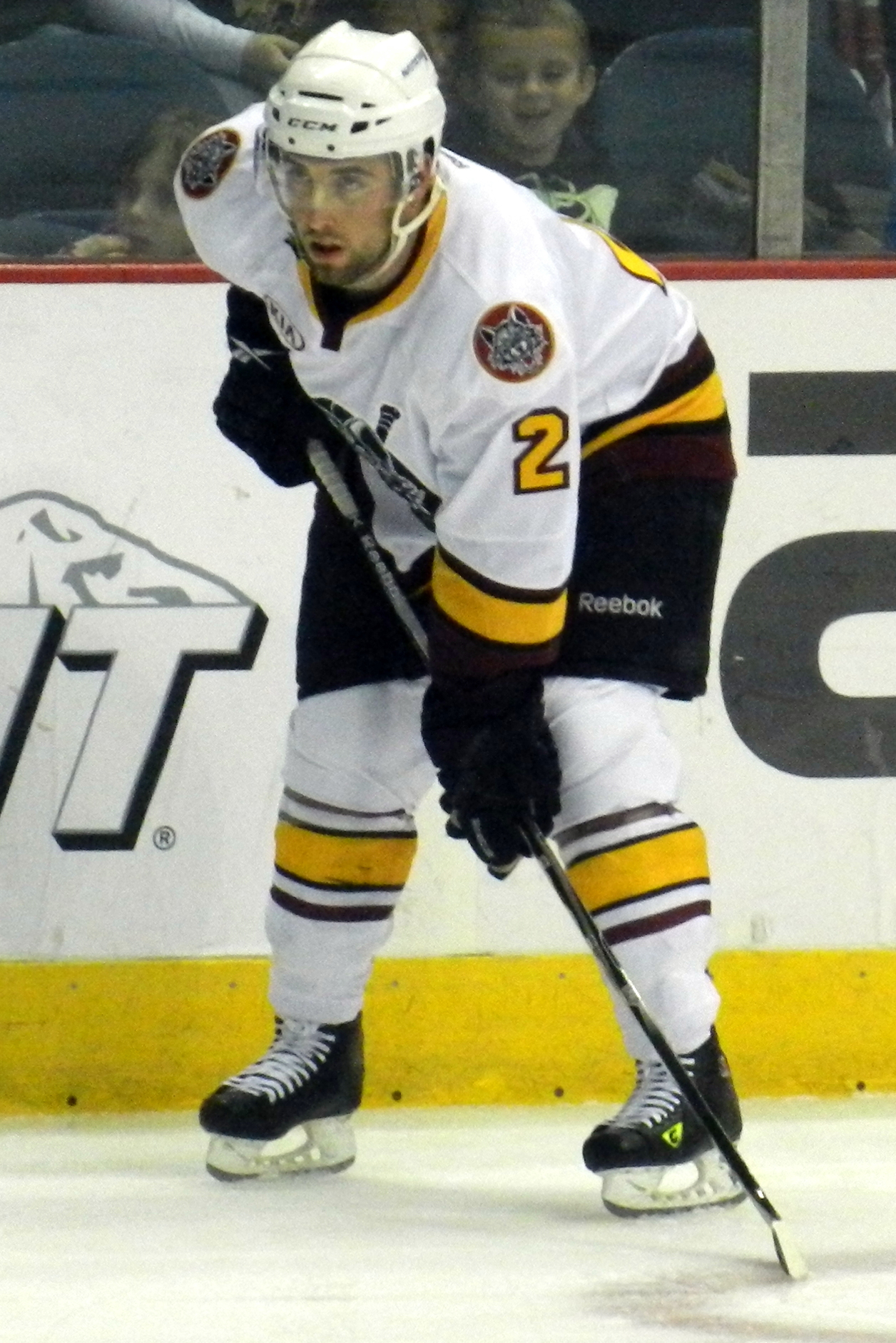
Hunt with the Chicago Wolves in 2012

Award	Season	Ref
Junior
PJHL All-Star and Prospect Game participant	2004–05	
Ridge Meadows Flames Rookie of the Year	2004–05	
Royal Bank Cup Championship	2005–06	
Burnaby Express Most Outstanding Defenceman	2006–07; 2007–08	
BCHL All-Star Game participant	2007–08	
College
CHA Rookie of the Year	2008–09	
All-CHA Rookie Team	2008–09	
All-CHA First Team	2008–09; 2009–10	
CHA All-Tournament Team	2008–09	
NCAA Midwest Regional All-Tournament Team	2008–09	
American Hockey League
AHL All-Star Classic participant	2012–13; 2014–15; 2015–16	
Second Team All-Star	2013–14	
First Team All-Star	2014–15; 2023–24	

Awards and achievements
Preceded by Matt Read	CHA Rookie of the Year; 2008–09	Succeeded by Jordan George
