= Brian Nugent =

Northern Irish cycling coach (born 1978)

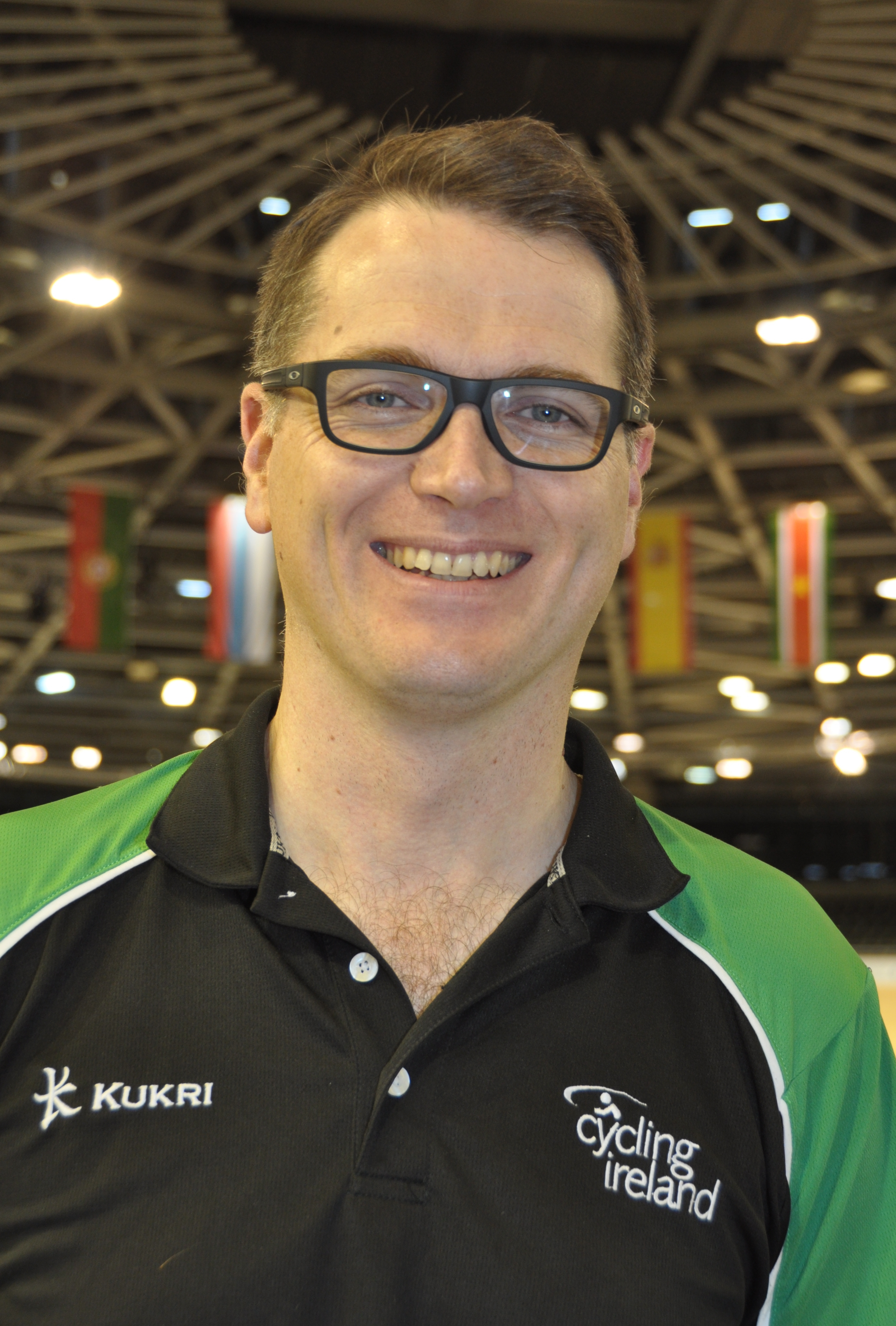
- Nugent in 2018

Personal information
- Full name: Brian Nugent
- Born: 1 November 1978 (age 47) Cookstown, County Tyrone, Northern Ireland

Cycling career
- Sport: Cycling
- Disciplines: Track and Road
- Role: Coach

Brian Nugent (born 1 November 1978 in Cookstown, Northern Ireland) is a cycling coach. He is known as Cycling Ireland’s track coach for women and paracyclists.
