= Richard Weymouth =

Royal Navy commander

Richard Weymouth (1780/81 – 24 August 1832) was a Royal Navy commander, notable as compiler of the Naval, Military, and Village Hymn Book, published in the year of his death and designed for non-denominational use: thus it aimed to exclude hymns which promulgated 'controverted doctrines'. The work also reflected his dislike of the practice of singing long hymns.

He was made a lieutenant in February 1801; appointed first of the Thisbe 28, armed en flûte, bearing the flag of Sir Charles Hamilton, in the river Thames, 13 October 1813; and promoted to the rank of commander, 13 December 1814.

This officer was an active and useful member of the Bethel Union. He died at Devonport, after an illness of only twelve hours duration, on 24 August 1832, aged 51 years.
