= Weymouth New Testament =

Bible translation by Richard Francis Weymouth

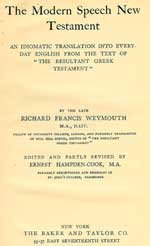
- Full name: The New Testament in Modern Speech
- Abbreviation: WNT
- Complete Bible published: 1904
- Translation type: literal

[[Image:|thumb|Weymouth New Testament, 1903]] The Weymouth New Testament ("WNT"), otherwise known as The New Testament in Modern Speech or The Modern Speech New Testament, is a translation of the New Testament into nineteenth-century English by Richard Francis Weymouth.

It was based on the text of The Resultant Greek Testament. The text was produced by Weymouth. It was what resulted from his compilation of readings from Stephens (1550), Lachmann, Tregelles, Tischendorf, Lightfoot, Ellicott, Alford, Weiss, the Bâle edition (1880), Westcott and Hort, and the Revision Committee of London. Where these editions differed, Weymouth selected the reading favoured by the majority of editors. The text was prepared for final publication by his secretary, Reverend Ernest Hampden-Cook, after Weymouth's death in 1902.

Weymouth also prepared a translation of his text, with notes. His aim was to discover how the inspired writers would have expressed and described the events of the New Testament had they been writing in nineteenth-century English. The translation was edited for publication by Hampden-Cook, also in 1903. It was published in 1903 by Baker & Taylor Company (New York) and James Clarke & Co (London). The Preface to the original states that the version's intended purpose was "to furnish a succinct and compressed running commentary (not doctrinal) to be used side by side with its elder compeers".

A second edition appeared in 1904, and a third in 1909. A pocket edition, without notes, was published in 1913. A fourth edition was revised by James Alexander Robertson and several other well-known New Testament scholars, and published in 1924. A further revision was published in 1929.
