= Williams Lake Mustangs (1978–1996) =

- City: Williams Lake, British Columbia, Canada
- League: Peace-Cariboo Junior Hockey League; Rocky Mountain Junior Hockey League
- Operated: 1978–1996

The Williams Lake Mustangs was a Junior ice hockey team from Williams Lake, British Columbia, Canada from 1978-1996. They were members of the Rocky Mountain Junior Hockey League.

== History ==
The Williams Lake Mustangs were founded in 1978 as members of the Peace-Cariboo Junior B League. In 1980, with the Peace-Cariboo League, the Mustangs were promoted to Junior A.

As members of the Peace-Cariboo League, the Mustangs won the PCJHL Trophy twice as playoff champions. They participated in the 1983 and 1989 Mowat Cup BC Jr. A championships as representatives of the PCJHL. In 1983, the British Columbia Junior Hockey League's Abbotsford Flyers defeated the Mustangs two-games-to-none. In 1989, the BCJHL's Vernon Lakers defeated the Mustangs two-games-to-none.

In 1991, the PCJHL merged with franchises from the Kootenays Region and became the Rocky Mountain League. The Mustangs won the RMJHL league title in 1993 and represented the league for the Mowat Cup. In 1993, the BCHL's Kelowna Spartans defeated the Mustangs three-games-to-none.

In 1996, the RMJHL's Peace-Cariboo division folded, forcing the Mustangs to take a year off. As a result, the Mustangs lost their renewal application for a bingo hall, the main source of revenue for the club. As a result, the club liquidated what they could of their debt. In March 1997, the club announced they would sit out a second consecutive season after failing to find new ownership. Later they lost their arena advertising rights and ceased operations. Junior hockey returned from 2002–2010 when the Williams Lake TimberWolves joined the British Columbia Hockey League, and again in 2024 when the Summerland Steam moved to Williams Lake and became the new Williams Lake Mustangs.

== Season-by-season standings ==
| Season | GP | W | L | T | OTL | GF | GA | P | Results | Playoffs |
| 1978-79 | 35 | 7 | 27 | 1 | - | 136 | 272 | 15 | 6th, PC Jr. B | |
| 1979-80 | 48 | 13 | 35 | 0 | - | 220 | 334 | 26 | 6th, PC Jr. B | Did not qualify |
| 1980-81 | 40 | 9 | 31 | 0 | - | 192 | 278 | 18 | 6th, PCJHL | Did not qualify |
| 1981-82 | 56 | 11 | 45 | 0 | - | 259 | 432 | 22 | 6th, PCJHL | Did not qualify |
| 1982-83 | 40 | 26 | 14 | 0 | - | 247 | 181 | 52 | 1st, PCJHL | PCJHL champions, 4-1 (Canucks) |
| 1983-84 | 50 | 35 | 14 | 1 | - | 352 | 215 | 71 | 2nd, PCJHL | Lost in finals, 1-4 (Spruce Kings) |
| 1984-85 | 48 | 31 | 16 | 1 | - | 276 | 206 | 63 | 2nd, PCJHL | Lost in semifinals, 0-4 (Spruce Kings) |
| 1985-86 | 50 | 28 | 21 | 1 | - | 277 | 253 | 57 | 2nd, PCJHL | Lost in finals, 1-4 (Spruce Kings) |
| 1986-87 | 48 | 12 | 34 | 2 | - | 202 | 277 | 26 | 6th, PCJHL | Did not qualify |
| 1987-88 | 50 | 19 | 31 | 0 | - | 220 | 261 | 38 | 4th, PCJHL | Lost in semifinals, 1-4 (North Stars) |
| 1988-89 | 52 | 39 | 13 | 0 | - | 371 | 206 | 78 | 2nd, PCJHL | PCJHL champions, 4-1 (North Stars) |
| 1989-90 | 52 | 26 | 23 | 3 | - | 295 | 266 | 55 | 3rd, PCJHL | Lost in semifinals, 1-4 (Spruce Kings) |
| 1990-91 | 54 | 36 | 16 | 2 | - | 352 | 212 | 74 | 2nd, PCJHL | Lost in finals, 1-4 (Spruce Kings) |
| 1991-92 | 52 | 27 | 23 | 2 | - | 278 | 250 | 56 | 3rd, Peace-Cariboo | Lost in quarterfinals, 1-4 (Huskies) |
| 1992-93 | 52 | 35 | 17 | - | 0 | 301 | 222 | 70 | 1st, Peace-Cariboo | RMJHL champions, 3-2 (Colts) |
| 1993-94 | 52 | 18 | 32 | - | 2 | 204 | 255 | 38 | 4th, Peace-Cariboo | Lost in quarterfinals, 0-4 (Spruce Kings) |
| 1994-95 | 52 | 24 | 26 | - | 2 | 262 | 267 | 50 | 3rd, Peace-Cariboo | Lost in semifinals, 0-4 (Spruce Kings) |
| 1995-96 | 58 | 13 | 45 | - | 0 | 201 | 347 | 26 | 5th, Peace-Cariboo | Did not qualify |

=== Playoffs ===
- 1981 DNQ
- 1982 DNQ
- 1983 Won league, lost Mowat Cup

Williams Lake Mustangs defeated Dawson Creek Kodiaks 3-games-to-1
Williams Lake Mustangs defeated Quesnel Millionaires 3-games-to-none
Williams Lake Mustangs defeated Dawson Creek Kodiaks 4-games-to-1 PCJHL champions
Abbotsford Flyers (BCJHL) defeated Williams Lake Mustangs 2-games-to-none

- 1984 Lost final

Williams Lake Mustangs defeated Grande Prairie North Stars 4-games-to-none
Prince George Spruce Kings defeated Williams Lake Mustangs 4-games-to-1

- 1985 Lost semi-final

Prince George Spruce Kings defeated Williams Lake Mustangs 4-games-to-none

- 1986 Lost final

Williams Lake Mustangs defeated Fort St. John Huskies 4-games-to-2
Prince George Spruce Kings defeated Williams Lake Mustangs 4-games-to-1

- 1987 DNQ
- 1988 Lost semi-final

Grande Prairie North Stars defeated Williams Lake Mustangs 4-games-to-1

- 1989 Won league, lost Mowat Cup

Williams Lake Mustangs defeated Fort St. John Huskies 4-games-to-1
Williams Lake Mustangs defeated Grande Prairie North Stars 4-games-to-1 PCJHL champions
Vernon Lakers (BCJHL) defeated Williams Lake Mustangs 2-games-to-none

- 1990 Lost semi-final

Prince George Spruce Kings defeated Williams Lake Mustangs 4-games-to-1

- 1991 Lost final

Williams Lake Mustangs defeated Fort St. John Huskies 4-games-to-none
Prince George Spruce Kings defeated Williams Lake Mustangs 4-games-to-1

- 1992 Lost quarter-final

Fort St. John Huskies defeated Williams Lake Mustangs 4-games-to-1

- 1993 Won League, lost Mowat Cup

Williams Lake Mustangs defeated Quesnel Millionaires 4-games-to-none
Williams Lake Mustangs defeated Prince George Spruce Kings 4-games-to-none
Williams Lake Mustangs defeated Cranbrook Colts 3-games-to-2 RMJHL champions
Kelowna Spartans (BCHL) defeated Williams Lake Mustangs 3-games-to-none

- 1994 Lost quarter-final

Prince George Spruce Kings defeated Williams Lake Mustangs 4-games-to-none

- 1995 Lost semi-final

Williams Lake Mustangs defeated Grande Prairie Chiefs 4-games-to-2
Prince George Spruce Kings defeated Williams Lake Mustangs 4-games-to-none

- 1996 DNQ

== NHL alumni ==
- Craig Berube
- Wade Flaherty
- Mark Kachowski
- Dean Malkoc
