= 2025–26 KIJHL season =

American and Canadian ice hockey season

- League: KIJHL
- Sport: Ice hockey
- Duration: September – February
- Games: 44
- Teams: 21
- Streaming partner: FloSports
- Prestige Cup: Revelstoke Grizzlies
- KIJHL Cup: Kimberley Dynamiters
- Runners-up: Princeton Posse

Seasons
- ← 2024–25 2026–27 WIJHL 2026–27 BCHC →

The 2025–26 KIJHL season is the 59th season of the Kootenay International Junior Hockey League (KIJHL). The regular season began on September 19, 2025 and ran until February 28th 2026. The only rematch of the 2025 Teck Cup Final was played, January 24th in Revelstoke with Grand Forks winning 4-3 in Overtime

== League changes ==
Following the annual general meeting in June 2025, the league announced a change to the playoff qualification criteria affecting teams in the Okanagan-Shuswap Conference. Recognizing that there are six clubs in the Bill Ohlhausen division while each of the other divisions have five clubs, the league introduced a wild card provision whereby the fifth place team in the Bill Ohlhausen division will qualify for the fourth playoff position in the Doug Birks division in the event that they have a superior record to the fourth place Doug Birks division club.

Prestige Hotels & Resorts was named the official hotel partner of the KIJHL on November 6, after becoming a sponsor of the KIJHL the previous season, as part of this partnership the KIJHL's presidents trophy awarded to the team with the best regular season record would be renamed to the Prestige Cup

In late January the league discreetly rebranded the playoffs and championship to the KIJHL playoffs, removing Teck as a sponsor as the contract had not been renewed

On February 3rd the Creston Valley Thundercats announced a branding change as part of the Tier 1/Tier 2 split, the club has not yet officially announced the, logo or colors. A poll was released to fans with the names to be voted on being the Creston Valley Thunder, Creston Valley Colts, Creston Valley Avalanche, and Creston Valley Cavalry, however a blank option was also provided, resulting in suggestions such as Creston Valley Chaos, Creston Valley Clippers, and Kootenay Colts, among others. The Creston Valley Thunder moniker was announced on March 8th after receiving nearly 60% of the over 600 votes cast, colors are presumed to be a return to green and gold, although black, blue and bronze are continuing to be used in the interim.

On February 12th the KIJHL announced that a new team in Summerland would begin play in the 2026-27 season, this team will operate as a Tier 2 franchise bringing the number of teams to 9, 22 in total, the team would later be announced as the Summerland Jets, in alignment with minor hockey

== Regular season ==
League map
Legend
- Kootenay Conference
- Eddie Mountain Division
- 1 Golden Rockets
- 2 Columbia Valley Rockies
- 3 Fernie Ghostriders
- 4 Kimberley Dynamiters
- 5 Creston Thundercats
- Neil Murdoch Division
- 6 Nelson Leafs
- 7 Castlegar Rebels
- 8 Beaver Valley Nitehawks
- 9 Spokane Braves
- 10 Grand Forks Border Bruins
- Okanagan/Shuswap Conference
- Bill Ohlhausen Division
- 11 Osoyoos Coyotes
- 12 Princeton Posse
- 13 Merritt Centennials
- 14 Kelowna Chiefs
- 15 Sicamous Eagles
- 16 Revelstoke Grizzlies
- Doug Birks Division
- 17 Chase Heat
- 18 Kamloops Storm
- 19 100 Mile House Wranglers
- 20 Williams Lake Mustangs
- 21 Quesnel River Rush

The regular season runs from 19 September 2025 through 28 February 2026. Each of the teams play a 44-game regular season schedule, including 33 or 34 against teams in the same conference, and one against each team in the other conference.

=== Schedule Matrix ===
Each team's schedule can be broken down as follows:

- Neil Murdoch Division
  - 1 game against each Doug Birks team (5 total: 5 home)
  - 1 game against each Bill Ohlhausen team (6 total: 6 away)
  - 2 games against all-but-one Eddie Mountain team (9 total: 4 away, 5 home)
  - 6 games against the other Neil Murdoch teams (24 total: 12 away, 12 home)
- Eddie Mountain Division
  - 1 game against each Doug Birks team (5 total: 5 away)
  - 1 game against each Bill Ohlhausen team (6 total: 6 home)
  - 2 games against all-but-one Neil Murdoch team (9 total: 5 away, 4 home)
  - 6 games against the other Eddie Mountain teams (24 total: 12 away, 12 home)
- Doug Birks Division
  - 1 game against each Neil Murdoch team (5 total: 5 away)
  - 1 game against each Eddie Mountain team (5 total: 5 home)
  - 2 games against each Bill Ohlhausen team (12 total: 6 away, 6 home)
  - 5 or 6 games against the other Doug Birks division teams (22 total: 11 away, 11 home)
- Bill Ohlhausen Division
  - 1 game against each Neil Murdoch team (5 total: 5 home)
  - 1 game against each Eddie Mountain team (5 total: 5 away)
  - 2 games against each Doug Birks team (10 total: 5 away, 5 home)
  - 4-5 games against the other Bill Ohlhausen teams (24 total:12 away, 12 home)

=== Home openers ===
Home and Season Openers
TEAM	Home Opener	Season Opener
Eddie Mountain
Golden Rockets	Sep 20th VS Revelstoke	Sep 19th @ Columbia Valley
Columbia Valley Rockies	Sep 19th VS Golden	
Kimberley Dynamiters	Sep 26th VS Columbia Valley	Sep 19th @ Nelson
Fernie Ghostriders	Sep 19th VS Creston	
Creston Thundercats	Sep 20th VS Columbia Valley	Sep 19th @ Fernie
Neil Murdoch
Nelson Leafs	Sep 19th VS Kimberley	
Castlegar Rebels	Oct 3rd VS Creston	Sep 20th @ Grand Forks
Beaver Valley Nitehawks	Sep 19th VS Spokane	
Grand Forks Border Bruins	Sep 20th VS Castlegar	
Spokane Braves	Sep 26th VS Quesnel	Sep 19th @ Beaver Valley
Bill Ohlhausen
Osoyoos Coyotes	Sep 19th VS 100 Mile	
Princeton Posse	Sep 27th VS Castlegar	Sep 19th @ Kelowna
Merritt Centenials	Sep 26th VS Castlegar	Sep 19th @ Quesnel
Kelowna Chiefs	Sep 19th VS Princeton	
Revelstoke Grizzlies	Oct 18th VS Beaver Valley	Sep 19th @ Sicamous
Sicamous Eagles	Sep 19th VS Revelstoke	
Doug Birks
Chase Heat	Sep 20th VS Kamloops	Sep 19th @ Kamloops
Kamloops Storm	Sep 19th VS Chase	
100 Mile House Wranglers	Oct 4th VS Merritt	Sep 19th @ Osoyoos
Williams Lake Mustangs	Sep 20th VS Merritt	
Quesnel River Rush	Sep 19th VS Merritt	

=== Standings ===
2025-2026 KIJHL Regular Season Standings
Team	W	L	OTL	SOL	Pts	GF	GA	GD
Kootenay Conference-Eddie Mountain Division
y-Kimberley Dynamiters	31	9	2	2	66	201	121	80
x-Fernie Ghostriders	24	15	3	2	53	133	118	15
x-Golden Rockets	23	18	3	0	49	152	172	-20
x-Columbia Valley Rockies	19	22	3	0	41	146	167	-21
e-Creston Valley Thundercats	15	26	1	2	33	136	159	-23
Kootenay Conference-Neil Murdoch Division
z-Beaver Valley Nitehawks	33	11	0	0	66	208	125	83
x-Grand Forks Border Bruins	29	14	0	1	59	191	133	58
x-Castlegar Rebels	20	20	4	0	44	135	151	-16
x-Spokane Braves	15	25	3	1	34	130	181	-51
e-Nelson Leafs	10	29	4	1	25	100	202	-102
Okanagan/Shuswap Conference-Bill Ohlhausen Division
p-Revelstoke Grizzlies	33	8	1	2	69	191	108	83
x-Princeton Posse	30	11	0	3	63	193	136	57
x-Kelowna Chiefs	26	12	3	3	58	184	159	25
x-Merritt Centennials	25	15	2	2	54	183	156	27
e-Osoyoos Coyotes	13	29	2	0	28	110	188	-78
e-Sicamous Eagles	12	28	2	2	28	133	205	-72
Okanagan/Shuswap Conference-Doug Birks Division
y-Kamloops Storm	32	10	1	1	66	201	133	68
x-Williams Lake Mustangs	26	13	2	3	57	177	151	26
x-Quesnel River Rush	22	17	4	1	49	172	153	19
x-Chase Heat	14	29	1	0	29	122	219	-97
e-100 Mile House Wranglers	10	26	5	3	28	118	179	-61

x-Clinched Playoffs c-Clinched the playoffs by crossing over into another division y-Clinched Division z-Clinched Conference p-Clinched best regular season record e-Eliminated from playoff contention

Weekly Division Leaders
Week	Eddie Mountain		Neil Murdoch		Bill Ohlhausen		Doug Birks	
Week	Team	Points	Team	Points	Team	Points	Team	Points
1	GOL, KIM, CRE	4	GFB, BVN	2	KEL,REV	3	Kamloops	4
2	KIM, GOL	6	Grand Forks	6	Princeton	6	Kamloops	6
3	KIM,CRE,GOL	8	Beaver Valley	8	PRI, MER	10	Kamloops	9
4	Creston	11	Beaver Valley	12	Kelowna	13	Kamloops	11
5	Kimberley	14	Beaver Valley	14	KEL, PRI	15	Kamloops	15
6	Kimberley	16	Beaver Valley	16	KEL, PRI	19	Kamloops	17
7	Kimberley	20	Beaver Valley	18	Princeton	21	Kamloops	21
8	Kimberley	24	Grand Forks	21	Princeton	27	Kamloops	25
9	Kimberley	26	Grand Forks	25	Princeton	28	Kamloops	29
10	Kimberley	28	Beaver Valley	30	Princeton	30	Kamloops	33
11	Kimberley	32	Beaver Valley	34	Kelowna	33	Kamloops	37
12	Kimberley	35	Beaver Valley	36	Kelowna	37	Kamloops	40
13	Kimberley	41	Beaver Valley	36	Kelowna	39	Kamloops	42
14	Kimberley	43	Beaver Valley	40	KEL, PRI	40	Kamloops	44
15	Kimberley	45	Beaver Valley	46	PRI, REV	42	Kamloops	46
16	Kimberley	47	Beaver Valley	46	PRI, REV	46	Kamloops	48
17	Kimberley	49	Beaver Valley	50	Revelstoke	50	Kamloops	52
18	Kimberley	53	Beaver Valley	52	Revelstoke	55	Kamloops	56
19	Kimberley	56	Beaver Valley	56	Revelstoke	57	Kamloops	58
20	Kimberley	60	Beaver Valley	58	Revelstoke	59	Kamloops	60
21	Kimberley	64	Beaver Valley	60	Revelstoke	63	Kamloops	62
22	Kimberley	66	Beaver Valley	64	Revelstoke	65	Kamloops	64
23	Kimberley	66	Beaver Valley	66	Revelstoke	69	Kamloops	66

=== Clinching timeline ===
==== January 10th, 2026 ====
The Beaver Valley Nitehawks became the first team to clinch the 2026 Playoffs by virtue of Spokane's 3-2 overtime loss to Princeton.

==== January 16th, 2026 ====
The Kimberley Dynamiters became the second team to clinch the 2026 Playoffs thanks to their 7-3 win at Golden.

The Kamloops Storm became the third team to clinch the 2026 Playoffs by defeating 100 Mile House 6-3

The Revelstoke Grizzlies became the fourth team to clinch the 2026 Playoffs by virtue of their 5-0 win against Osoyoos

The Princeton Posse became the fifth team to clinch the 2026 Playoffs by winning 4-2 against Kelowna

==== January 20th, 2026 ====
By virtue of Spokane's loss the Grand Forks Border Bruins became the sixth team to clinch a playoff berth

==== January 23rd, 2026 ====
The Kelowna Chiefs became the seventh team, and the third from the Bill Ohlhausen division to clinch the playoffs by defeating Castlegar

==== January 24th, 2026 ====
The Quesnel River Rush, clinched the playoffs by virtue of their win over Chase, the eighth team to secure their playoff spot

==== January 25th, 2026 ====
The Williams Lake Mustangs joined their Cariboo rivals in the playoffs by defeating Kelowna, the 9th team to make the playoffs.

==== January 30th, 2026 ====
The Beaver Valley Nitehawks became the first team to clinch home-ice-advantage in the first round of the playoffs by virtue of their win over Osoyoos and Castlegar's loss to Fernie

The Merritt Centennials became the 7th team from the Okanagan/Shuswap conference to make the playoffs by defeating Sicamous and getting help from Beaver Valley

The Kamloops Storm became the second team to be guaranteed home-ice advantage in the first round of the playoffs by virtue of their home win against Revelstoke

==== February 6th, 2026 ====
The Kimberley Dynamiters became the third team to be guaranteed home-ice-advantage, and the first to win their division by defeating Creston

The Castlegar Rebels became the third team from the Neil Murdoch Division, and the 11th overall to clinch a playoff berth

The Grand Forks Border Bruins, secured home-ice-advantage, making the Neil Murdoch Division, the first division with both home-ice-advantages decided

==== February 7th, 2026 ====
The Fernie Ghostriders joined their division rival in the playoffs by defeating Columbia Valley

The Kamloops Storm became the second team to clinch a divisional title, by defeating Merritt on home ice, in front of their largest crowd to date.

The Williams Lake Mustangs and Quesnel River Rush became the first division semi-finals matchup to be confirmed, with home ice advantage to be decided in the coming weeks

==== February 10th, 2026 ====
The Golden Rockets became the third team to clinch the playoffs

==== February 13th, 2026 ====
The Fernie Ghostriders and Golden Rockets became the second division semi-finals matchup to be confirmed, home ice advantage will be determined in the following weeks

==== February 14th, 2026 ====
The Spokane Braves clinched the playoffs for the first time since 2019/20 and are the fourth team from the Neil Murdoch to do so

The Nelson Leafs were eliminated from playoff contention for the first time in nearly forty years, in a season the saw Head Coach Barry Wolf fired, and General Manager Dale Hladun let go

The Revelstoke Grizzlies clinched home ice advantage, becoming the first team in the Bill Ohlhausen to do so.

==== February 17th, 2026 ====
The Revelstoke Grizzlies defeated Sicamous to clinch the Bill Ohlhausen Division for the first time in franchise history

==== February 20th, 2026 ====
The Merritt Centennials and the Revelstoke Grizzlies first round matchup was confirmed with Revelstoke owning home-ice advantage as the Division Champs

The Princeton Posse and Kelowna Chiefs secured their first round matchup with home ice advantage to be determined in the following week

==== February 21st, 2026 ====
The Columbia Valley Rockies became the fourth team to clinch the Eddie Mountain playoffs, eliminating the Creston Valley Thundercats and confirming a first round matchup against Kimberley

The Beaver Valley Nitehawks clinched the Neil Murdoch Division, and a first round matchup against the Spokane Braves. This result also guaranteed a Grand Forks-Castlegar first round series, with Grand Forks having home-ice advantage

The Williams Lake Mustangs clinched home-ice advantage in their first round series against Quesnel

==== February 27th, 2026 ====
The Fernie Ghostriders clinched home-ice advantage in their first round series against Golden.

The Princeton Posse became the 8th team to secure home-ice advantage in the first round.

The Revelstoke Grizzlies clinched both the Okanagan Conference and the Prestige trophy for the league's best record

==== February 28th, 2026 ====
The Chase Heat rounded out the playoff field becoming the 16th and final team to clinch a playoff berth securing a first round matchup against Kamloops, while simultaneously eliminating 100 Mile House, Osoyoos and Sicamous

The Beaver Valley Nitehawks clinched the Kootenay Conference title

Weekly Awards
Week	Team of the Week						Rookie of the Week
Week	Forwards			Defencemen		Goaltender	Rookie of the Week
Regular Season
1	Liam Munro (CRE)	Luca D'Amore (KAM)	Travis Langlois (MER)	Russell Weatherhead (OSO)	Garrett Janzen (GFB)	Beck Boiteau (GOL)	Jake Murdoch (KIM)
2	Peter Godley (CVR)	Brady Magarrell (BVN)	Luke Davies (KIM)	Lukas Masters (CVR)	Logan Findlay (CRE)	Jaxson Dikur (WLM)	Shiva Singh (CHA)
3	JP Desabrais (WLM)	Lynden Gorman (QUE)	Steven Foster (MER)	Kole Duquette (MHW)	Sam Chartres (BVN)	Brenner Fyfe (KAM)	Preston Shumate (BVN)
4	Ollie Clement (BVN)	Toren Fron (QUE)	Connor Shymoniak (REV)	Landen Janz (MHW)	Chase Kunn (OSO)	Dawson Groen (MHW)	Dawson Groen (MHW)
5	Lynden Gorman (QUE)	Justice Loewen (PRI)	Hayden Evans (FER)	Owen Bambrick (CRE)	Sam Dal Cin (KEL)	Leo den Besten (FER)	Owen Bambrick (CRE)
6	Rylan Konecsni (KEL)	Justice Loewen (PRI)	Bryton Morrow (PRI)	Jake Kesler (KEL)	Jackson Murphy (KIM)	Austin Seibel (REV)	Chase Campbell (SIC)
7	Brayden Schwartz (KIM)	Carter Hensch (CVR)	Hayden Selin (KAM)	Nate Turton (FER)	Jackson Murphy (KIM)	Leo den Besten (FER)	Ethan Torres (OSO)
8	Luca D'Amore (KAM)	Bryton Morrow (PRI)	Will Bell (PRI)	Evan Murray (KEL)	Jackson Murphy (KIM)	Ryan Bain (CHA)	Maddox Popke (REV)
9	Brayden Schwartz (KIM)	Brady Magarrell (BVN)	Liam Munro (CRE)	Ben Edwards (GFB)	Declan Pocock (WLM)	Stanislav Stefaniv (CHA)	Gavyn Schaufele (QUE)
10	Teghan Mullin (KAM)	Brady Magarrell (BVN)	Brenden Stirbu (KEL)	Jack Bodel (BVN)	Ian George (QUE)	Tyler Picha (MER)	Brady Walker (BVN)
11	Chase Campbell (SIC)	Spencer Bates (QUE)	Brenden Stirbu (KEL)	Johnny Lozeman (CVR)	Maddox DePasquale (GOL)	Kyan Gray (QUE)	Harrison Todd (CVR)
12	Luca D'Amore (KAM)	Levi Astill (GFB)	Jake Neufeld (REV)	Tobin Mikkelsen (SPO)	Declan Pocock (WLM)	Leo den Besten (FER)	Dawson Butler (GOL)
13	Jackson Roberts (GOL)	Levi Astill (GFB)	JP Desabrais (WLM)	Logan McCabe (GFB)	Dawson Rowse (WLM)	Thomas Samborski (GFB)	Shiva Singh (CHA)
14	Hayden Iron Shirt (GOL)	Levi Astill (GFB)	Kaden Wilkins (MER)	Logan McCabe (GFB)	Ryan Neufeld (BVN)	Beck Boiteau (GOL)	Jaxson Dikur (WLM)
15	Cameron Oien (SPO)	Isaiah Bagri (QUE)	Will Bell (PRI)	Tobin Mikkelsen (SPO)	Gairen Bona (MER)	Leo den Besten (FER)	Quinton Barton (SPO)
16	Noah Paulsen (KAM)	Asher Lucas (WLM)	Aidan Hicks (CAS)	Wyatt Olson (KAM)	Declan Pocock (WLM)	Evan Leggett (CAS)	Austin Tellefson (GFB)
17	Diego Cazac (QUE)	Jett Patola (REV)	Cooper Thompson (GOL)	Kieran Thibault (KAM)	Logan Findlay (CRE)	Jaiden Jakubowski (SPO)	Nicklas Wytrychowski (KAM)
18	Brendan Kindlein (QUE)	Isaiah Bagri (QUE)	Hayden Evans (GFB)	Gairen Bona (GFB)	Teegan Mudryk (KAM)	Sam Saskiw (MER)	Gavyn Schaufele
19	Brady Magarrell (BVN)	Asher Lucas (WLM)	Bryton Morrow (PRI)	Logan McCabe (GFB)	Declan Pocock (WLM)	Jaxson Dikur (WLM)	Austin Tellefson (GFB)
20	Lynden Donald-Gorman (QUE)	Carter Coutu (KIM)	Deegan Sellers (SPO)	Maddox Popke (REV)	Maddox Depasquale (GOL)	Stanislav Stefaniv (GOL)	Chase Campbell (SIC)
21	Hayden Iron Shirt (GOL)	Luke Davies (KIM)	Rylan Davis (CAS)	Faris Meddeb (REV)	Kaelen Halowaty (OSO)	Austin Seibel (REV)	Jac Carli (CAS)
22	Kaiden Sydenham (KEL)	JP Desabrais (WLM)	Aidan Hicks (CAS)	Kaidon Mah (CAS)	Trent Thiessen (WLM)	Jac Carli (CAS)	Ryder Hunt (OSO)
23	Walker Overwater (REV)	Callum MacLean (MER)	Maddox Gandha (BVN)	Lukas Masters (MER)	Diego Smith (REV)	Kael Svenson (FER)	Callum McLean (MER)
Division Semi Finals
Playoffs 1	Walker Overwater (REV)			Ben Edwards (GFB)		Austin Seibel (REV)	Nicholas Clark (KAM)
Playoffs 2	Will Bell (PRI)			Nathan Laforge (KIM)		Sam Saskiw (MER)	Karsten Hugenholtz (BVN)
Division Finals
Playoffs 3	Jaden Rusznak (KIM)			Ryan Neufeld (BVN)		Gibson Horne (PRI)	Chaz Lucas (WLM)
Playoffs 4	Bryton Morrow (PRI)			Jackson Murphy (KIM)		Jaxson Dikur (WLM)	Adam Kisilevich (KIM)
Conference Finals
Playoffs 5	Jace Shuttleworth (PRI)			Johnny Lozeman (KIM)		Adam Kisilevich (KIM)	Brady Walker (BVN)
Playoffs 6	Bryton Morrow (PRI)			Ben Dods (PRI)		Adam Kisilevich (KIM)	Brady Walker (BVN)
Championship
Playoffs 7	Toren Fron (KIM)			Callan Valstar (KIM)		Adam Kisilevich (KIM)	Adam Kisilevich (KIM)
Playoffs 8	Justice Loewen (PRI)			Ben Dods (PRI)		Gibson Horne (PRI)	Cale Chimera (PRI)

Stars of the Month
Month	Top Forward	Top Defenceman	Top Goaltender	Top Rookie
September	Luke Davies (KIM)	Garrett Janzen (GFB)	Michael Makowsky (SIC)	Connor Smith (BVN)
October	Bryton Morrow (PRI)	Jackson Murphy (KIM)	Dawson Groen (MHW)	Owen Bambrick (CRE)
November	Brady Magarrell (BVN)	Jackson Murphy (KIM)	Brenner Fyfe (KAM)	Chase Campbell (SIC)
December	Levi Astill (GFB)	Declan Pocock (WLM)	Thomas Samborski (GFB)	Noah Lawless (MER)
January	Levi Astill (GFB)	Gairen Bona (WLM)	Jaxson Dikur (WLM)	Noah Lawless (MER)
February	Peter Godley (CVR)	Declan Pocock (WLM)	Jac Carli (CAS)	Shiva Singh (CHA)
March	Jaden Rusznak (KIM)	Jackson Murphy (KIM)	Gibson Horne (PRI)	Adam Kisilevich (KIM)

Year-end award winners
Award	Eddie Mountain Division Winner	Neil Murdoch Division Winner	Bill Ohlhausen Division Award Winner	Doug Birks Division Award Winner	Overall KIJHL award winner
Most Valuable Player	Luke Davies (KIM)	Brady Magarrell (BVN)	Will Bell (PRI)	Noah Paulsen (KAM)	Brady Magarrell (BVN)
Top Scorer	Luke Davies (KIM) and Hayden Iron Shirt (GOL)	Levi Astill (GFB)	Will Bell (PRI)	JP Desbrais (WLM)	Levi Astill (GFB)
Top Defenceman	Jackson Murphy (KIM)	Logan McCabe (GFB)	Jake Kessler (KEL)	Declan Pocock (WLM)	Declan Pocock (WLM)
Top Goaltender	Leo den Besten (FER)	Jac Carli (CAS)	Austin Seibel (REV)	Brenner Fyfe (KAM)	Leo den Besten (FER)
Rookie of the Year	Hayden Iron Shirt (GOL)	Michiel Leenders (BVN)	Chase Campbell (SIC)	Shiva Singh (CHA)	Chase Campbell (SIC)
Most Sportsmanlike players	Peter Godley (CVR)	Owen Dickson (BVN)	Mason Rudolph (OSO)	Alberto Kellgren (WLM)	Peter Godley (CVR)
Coach of the Year	Jed Houseman (GOL)	Terry Jones (BVN)	Jiri Novak (REV)	Tyrel Lucas (WLM)	Terry Jones (BVN)
General Manager of the Year	Derek Stuart (KIM)	Jesse Dorans (CAS)	Ryan Parent (REV)	Matte Kolle (KAM)	Derek Stuart (KIM)

== Playoffs ==
The 2026 KIJHL Playoffs began on March 6th 2026, with all eight series in action. At the beginning of February the KIJHL quietly removed Teck as the sponsor of the playoffs and championship due to the contract expiring.

Division Semi-Finals
EM1	Kimberley	4
EM4	Columbia Valley	0
EM2	Fernie	4
EM3	Golden	2
NM1	Beaver Valey	4
NM4	Spokane	0
NM2	Grand Forks	4
NM3	Castlegar	0
DB1	Kamloops	4
DB4	Chase	0
DB2	Williams Lake	4
DB3	Quesnel	3
BO1	Revelstoke	4
BO4	Merritt	2
BO2	Princeton	4
BO3	Kelowna	3

Division Finals
EM1	Kimberley	4
EM2	Fernie	1
NM1	Beaver Valley	4
NM2	Grand Forks	3
DB1	Kamloops	0
DB2	Williams Lake	4
BO1	Revelstoke	2
BO2	Princeton	4

Conference Finals
EM1	Kimberley	4
NM1	Beaver Valley	0
DB2	Williams Lake	0
BO2	Princeton	4

2026 KIJHL Championship
EM1	Kimberley	4
BO2	Princeton	3

=== Schedule ===
First Round Schedule
Series	Fri Mar 6	Sat Mar 7	Mon Mar 9	Tue Mar 10	Wed Mar 11	Thu Mar 12	Fri Mar 13	Sat Mar 14	Sun Mar 15	Mon Mar 16	Result
KIM/CVR	6-1 KIM	6-1 KIM	4-1 KIM	6-0 KIM			-	-		-	4-0 KIM
FER/GOL	5-3 FER	4-2 FER	3-5 GOL	3-1 FER			3-5 GOL	5^{+}-4 FER		-	4-2 FER
BVN/SPO	5-3 BVN	6-5 BVN	6-2 BVN	5-1 BVN			-	-		-	4-0 BVN
GFB/CAS	5-2 GFB	9-2 GFB		4-1 GFB	5-1 GFB		-	-		-	4-0 GFB
KAM/CHA	4-1 KAM	6-3 KAM		5-1 KAM	4-2 KAM		-		-	-	4-0 KAM
WLM/QUE^{[a]}	2-3^{+} QUE	3-2 WLM	2-3 QUE			4-2 WLM	3-2 WLM		3-4 QUE	3^{+}-2 WLM	4-3 WLM
REV/MER	5^{+}-4 REV	5-0 REV		4-3 REV	0-3 MER		2-4 MER	7-2 REV		-	4-2 REV
PRI/KEL	3-4^{+}KEL	1-3 KEL	2-3^{+}KEL	3-2 PRI			6-3 PRI	6-4 PRI		6-3 PRI	4-3 PRI
All series hosted in 2-2-1-1-1 format with start times at 7:00 pm local time. Higher seed listed first. ^{+}Indicates overtime period
Note: [a] due to ice time constraints in Williams Lake the series was be 2-3-2, Game 4 was suspended late in the first due to an on-ice incident the resumption was moved to March 12th. Game 6 was moved to march 15th as a result

Second Round Schedule
Series	Fri Mar 20	Sat Mar 21	Mon Mar 23	Tue Mar 24	Wed Mar 25	Fri Mar 27	Sat Mar 28	Mon Mar 30	Result
KIM/FER	5-2 KIM	7-1 KIM	2^{+}-1 KIM	1-2^{+} FER		2-1 KIM	-	-	4-1 KIM
BVN/GFB	4-1 BVN	7-1 BVN		1-9 GFB	7-4 BVN	0-2 GFB	1-4 GFB	4^{+}-3 BVN	4-3 BVN
KAM/WLM	1-2 WLM	3-4 WLM	2-4 WLM	0-4 WLM		-	-	-	0-4 WLM
REV/PRI	2-4 PRI	2-3 PRI		4-5^{+} PRI	2^{+}-1 REV	4^{+}-3 REV	0-9 PRI	-	2-4 PRI
All series hosted in 2-2-1-1-1 format with start times at 7:00 pm local time. Higher seed listed first. ^{+}Indicates overtime period

Conference Finals
Series	Fri Apr 3	Sat Apr 4	Mon Apr 6	Tue Apr 7	Fri Apr 10	Sat Apr 11	Mon Apr 13	Result
BVN/KIM	1-4 KIM	3-4 KIM	1-3 KIM	4-5^{+} KIM	-	-	-	0-4 KIM
PRI/WLM	4-1 PRI	4-3 PRI	4-2 PRI	4-1 PRI	-	-	-	4-0 PRI
All series hosted in 2-2-1-1-1 format with start times at 7:00 pm local time. Higher seed listed first. ^{+}Indicates overtime period

2026 KIJHL Championship Series
Series	Fri Apr 17	Sat Apr 18	Tue Apr 21	Wed Apr 22	Sat Apr 25	Mon Apr 27	Thu Apr 30	Result
KIM/PRI	3-1 KIM	2-1 KIM	0-1^{+} PRI	0-1 PRI	4-6 PRI	5-1 KIM	4^{++}-3 KIM	4-3 KIM
All series hosted in 2-2-1-1-1 format with start times at 7:00 pm local time. Higher seed listed first. ^{+}Indicates overtime period
