= 2026–27 WIJHL season =

- League: WIJHL
- Sport: Ice hockey
- Duration: September 18 – February 28
- Games: 44
- Teams: 10
- Streaming partner: FloSports

Seasons
- Inaugural Season 2027–28 →

The 2026–27 Western International Junior Hockey League (WIJHL) season will be the first in league history after eight former members of the Kootenay International Junior Hockey League (KIJHL) opted to leave Hockey Canada and become an independent feeder league to the BCHL. The inaugural season will involve the eight teams who left the KIJHL and two expansion teams, one in Oliver and the other in Enderby.

== Regular Season ==
The ten clubs will be aligned into two divisions of five teams each, the North and South.

Each teams schedule can be broken down as follows:

- Seven games against each division opponent (28 total, 14 home, 14 away)
- Four games against one non-division opponent (4 total, 2 home, 2 away)
- Three games against all remaining non-division opponents (12 total, 6 home, 6 away)

Each team will play forty four regular season games

The regular season will begin Friday, September 18 and will run until Sunday, February 28

Team	City	Arena
Northern Division
100 Mile House Wranglers	100 Mile House, BC	South Cariboo Recreation Centre
Chase Heat	Chase, BC	Art Holding Memorial Arena
Enderby Icemen	Enderby, BC	John Pritchard Memorial Arena
Golden Rockets	Golden, BC	Golden District Centennial Arena
Sicamous Eagles	Sicamous, BC	Sicamous & District Rec Centre
Southern Division
Castlegar Rebels	Castlegar, BC	Castlegar District Rec Centre
Creston Valley Thunder	Creston, BC	Johnny Bucyk Arena
Kelowna Chiefs	Rutland, BC	Rutland Arena
Oliver Outlaws	Oliver, BC	Oliver & District Arena
Spokane Braves	Spokane, WA	Eagles Ice Arena

2026-27 WIJHL Standings
Northern Division
Team	W	L	OTL	SOL	Pts	GF	GA	GD
100 Mile House	0	0	0	0	0	0	0	0
Chase	0	0	0	0	0	0	0	0
Enderby	0	0	0	0	0	0	0	0
Golden	0	0	0	0	0	0	0	0
Sicamous	0	0	0	0	0	0	0	0
Southern Division
Team	W	L	OTL	SOL	Pts	GF	GA	GD
Castlegar	0	0	0	0	0	0	0	0
Creston Valley	0	0	0	0	0	0	0	0
Kelowna	0	0	0	0	0	0	0	0
Oliver	0	0	0	0	0	0	0	0
Spokane	0	0	0	0	0	0	0	0

== Playoffs ==
The playoffs will begin Friday, March 5 with eight of the league's ten clubs competing
