= Castlegar Apollos =

- City: Castlegar, British Columbia
- League: West Kootenay Junior Hockey League
- Operated: 1967-68

Franchise history
- 1967-68: Castlegar Apollos

The Castlegar Apollos were a junior 'B' ice hockey team based in Castlegar, British Columbia, Canada. They were members of the Western Division of the West Kootenay Junior Hockey League (WKJHL) from 1967 to 1969 (now known as the Kootenay International Junior Hockey League (KIJHL)).

The Apollos joined the league in 1967 as an expansion team and folded in 1968.

== History ==
After the Apollos folded in 1968, the Castlegar Rebels joined the Kootenay International Junior Hockey League (KIJHL) as an expansion team in 1976 until 1996, where they joined the Rocky Mountain Junior Hockey League (RMJHL) as a junior 'A' team, until 1998 where they once again joined the KIJHL, where they still currently play.

== Season-by-season record ==
Note: GP = Games played, W = Wins, L = Losses, T = Ties, Pts = Points, GF = Goals for, GA = Goals against

Records as of December 13, 1970.

Season	GP	W	L	T	Pts	GF	GA	Finish	Playoffs
1967–68	32	12	19	1	25	130	233	4th, WKJHL	
