= Castlegar =

Castlegar may refer to:

- Castlegar, British Columbia, Canada
  - Castlegar Airport
  - Castlegar Primary School
  - Castlegar Rebels, a Junior 'B' ice hockey team
  - Castlegar Apollos, a former junior 'B' ice hockey team
- Castlegar, County Galway, Ireland, a village near Galway city
  - Castlegar GAA, a Gaelic Athletic Association club
- Castlegar, County Mayo, Ireland, a townland near Claremorris; see List of townlands of County Mayo

== See also ==
- Castlegard, a fictional village in Timeline
