= Creston Clippers =

- City: Creston, British Columbia, Canada
- League: Kootenay International Junior Hockey League
- Division: Eastern
- Operated: 1976-1985
- Colours: Kelly green, California gold and snow white

Franchise history
- 1976-85: Creston Clippers

The Creston Clippers were a junior 'B' ice hockey team based in Creston, British Columbia, Canada. They were members of the Eastern Division of the Kootenay International Junior Hockey League (KIJHL).

The Clippers joined the league in 1976 as an expansion team. After nine seasons, the team folded in 1985. They won one division title as a member of the Eastern Division.

== History ==
After the Clippers folded in 1985, the Creston Thunder joined the Rocky Mountain Junior Hockey League (RMJHL) as a junior 'A' team as an expansion team in 1992, but by the 1998-99 season, the RMJHL had fallen to four teams and was playing a lot of interleague with the America West Hockey League. The Creston Thunder could not afford the travel and opted to leave the RMJHL, effectively forcing the league to fold, at the end of the 1999 playoffs. The team sat out for the 1999-00 season to reorganize. Prior to the 2000-01 season, the team was renamed the Creston Valley Thunder Cats and joined the Kootenay International Junior Hockey League, as a junior 'B' team.

== Season-by-season record ==
Note: GP = Games played, W = Wins, L = Losses, T = Ties, OTL = Overtime Losses, Pts = Points, GF = Goals for, GA = Goals against

Season	GP	W	L	T	OTL	Pts	GF	GA	Finish	Playoffs
1976–77	44	19	23	2	-	40	167	200	2nd, East	
1977–78	42	29	13	0	-	58	223	180	1st, East	Lost in Finals (Rebels)
1978–79	40	10	29	1	-	21	193	287	6th, East	
1979–80	40	15	20	5	-	35	211	200	5th, East	
1980-81	40	19	20	1	-	39	205	191	3rd, East	
1981–82	42	9	32	1	-	19	169	297	6th, East	
1982–83	42	14	28	9	-	28	196	259	6th, East	
1983-84	42	5	36	1	-	11	155	354	5th, East	
1984-85	42	20	20	2	-	42	236	237	3rd, East	

== Notable alumni ==
- Jamie Huscroft
