= Prince George Spruce Kings =

Junior ice hockey club

- City: Prince George, British Columbia
- League: BCHL
- Division: Interior
- Founded: 1972
- Home arena: Kopar Memorial Arena
- Colours: Red; Blue
- General manager: Mike Hawes
- Head coach: Alex Evin
- Website: sprucekings.bc.ca

Previous franchise history
- 1972–1975: PNWHL
- 1975–1991: PCJHL
- 1991–1996: RMJHL
- Since 1996: BCHL

Championships
- League: 2019
- Regional: 2019

The Prince George Spruce Kings is a junior ice hockey team and franchise of the British Columbia Hockey League (BCHL). The team plays its home games at the Kopar Memorial Arena in Prince George, British Columbia.

== History ==
Founded in 1972, the Spruce Kings originally were a part of the Pacific Northwest Hockey League. In 1975, the Spruce Kings and the neighboring Quesnel Millionaires joined the Peace Junior B Hockey League, which renamed itself the Peace-Cariboo Junior Hockey League. In 1980, the league was promoted to Junior A and the Spruce Kings won the league's first Junior A championship. From 1980 until 1996, the Kings won nine league titles. In 1981, the Spruce Kings defeated Fort St. John Golden Hawks 4-games-to-3 to claim their first Junior A title.

In 1994, the Royal City Outlaws had joined the BCHL as an expansion franchise. In 1996, the Spruce Kings bought out the BCHL rights of the Outlaws, using the rights to move the Spruce Kings into the BCHL.

In 2007, the Spruce Kings hosted the national championship Royal Bank Cup. They lost in the final after a record-setting quintuple overtime match in the semifinal against the Camrose Kodiaks. At 146 minutes, it was the longest game in Royal Bank Cup history.

The Spruce Kings won their first BCHL championship in 2019.

== Season-by-season record ==
=== Pacific Northwest Hockey League ===
Note: GP = Games played, W = Wins, L = Losses, T = Ties, OTL = Overtime losses, GF = Goals for, GA = Goals against, PTS = Points

Season	GP	W	L	T	OTL	GF	GA	PTS	Finish	Playoffs
1972–73	28	19	9	0	—	216	141	38	1st, PNHL	
1973–74	40	31	9	0	—	219	132	62	1st, PNHL	
1974–75	40	19	21	0	—			0.475	6th, PNHL	

=== Peace-Cariboo Junior Hockey League ===
Note: GP = Games played, W = Wins, L = Losses, T = Ties, OTL = Overtime losses, GF = Goals for, GA = Goals against, PTS = Points

Season	GP	W	L	T	OTL	GF	GA	PTS	Finish	Playoffs
1975–76	40	19	20	1	—	203	176	39	4th, PCJHL	PCJHL champions, 4–1 (North Stars)
1976–77	40	15	25	0	—	205	215	30	5th, PCJHL	did not qualify
1977–78	40	18	22	0	—	171	217	36	5th, PCJHL	
1978–79	36	21	15	0	—	209	165	42	4th, PCJHL	
1979–80	48	36	11	1	—	296	163	73	1st, PCJHL	PCJHL champions
1980–81	40	26	13	1	—	197	133	53	1st, PCJHL	PCJHL champions, 4–3 (Golden Hawks)
1981–82	56	44	12	0	—	418	219	88	1st, PCJHL	PCJHL champions, 4–1 (North Stars)
1982–83	40	15	25	0	—	199	243	30	4th, PCJHL	Lost in semifinals, 2–3 (Canucks)
1983–84	50	43	7	0	—	337	176	86	1st, PCJHL	PCJHL champions, 4–1 (Mustangs)
1984–85	48	26	21	1	—	274	221	53	3rd, PCJHL	PCJHL champions, 4–0 (Huskies)
1985–86	50	44	6	0	—	415	171	88	1st, PCJHL	PCJHL champions, 4–1 (Mustangs)
1986–87	48	33	14	1	—	314	216	67	1st, PCJHL	Lost in semifinals, 2–4 (Millionaires)
1987–88	50	29	20	1	—	315	241	59	3rd, PCJHL	Lost in finals, 3–4 (North Stars)
1988–89	52	26	26	0	—	289	205	52	4th, PCJHL	Lost in semifinals, 1–4 (North Stars)
1989–90	52	34	18	0	—	365	218	68	2nd, PCJHL	PCJHL champions, 4–0 (Huskies)
1990–91	54	40	12	2	—	374	211	82	1st, PCJHL	PCJHL champions, 4–1 (Mustangs)

=== Rocky Mountain Junior Hockey League ===
Note: GP = Games played, W = Wins, L = Losses, T = Ties, OTL = Overtime losses, GF = Goals for, GA = Goals against, PTS = Points

Season	GP	W	L	T	OTL	GF	GA	PTS	Finish	Playoffs
1991–92	52	36	14	2	—	344	228	74	1st, RMJHL Peace-Cariboo division	RMJHL champions, 3–2 (Smoke Eaters)
1992–93	52	34	18	—	0	285	221	68	2nd, RMJHL Peace-Cariboo	Lost in semifinals, 0–4 (Mustangs)
1993–94	52	36	14	—	2	299	188	74	1st, RMJHL Peace-Cariboo	Lost semifinals, 2–4 (Huskies)
1994–95	52	41	9	—	2	342	186	84	1st, RMJHL Peace-Cariboo	Lost finals, 2–4 (Colts)
1995–96	58	37	18	—	3	324	251	77	2nd, RMJHL Peace-Cariboo	RMJHL champions, 4–1 (Ghostriders)

=== British Columbia Hockey League ===
Note: GP = Games played, W = Wins, L = Losses, T = Ties, OTL = Overtime losses, GF = Goals for, GA = Goals against, PTS = Points

Season	GP	W	L	T	OTL	GF	GA	PTS	Finish	Playoffs
1996–97	60	28	30	2	0	233	283	58	4th, Interior	Lost in preliminary, 1–2 (Centennials)
1997–98	60	22	36	2	0	230	269	46	5th, Interior	Lost in quarterfinals, 2–4 (Panthers)
1998–99	60	37	20	0	3	305	229	77	2nd, Interior	Lost in division finals, 0–4 (Vipers)
1999–00	60	36	23	0	1	293	245	73	3rd, Interior	Lost conference semifinals, 2–4 (Vipers)
2000–01	60	28	26	0	6	237	248	62	3rd, Interior	Lost quarterfinals, 0–4 (Centennials)
2001–02	60	16	36	0	8	220	300	40	7th, Interior	did not qualify
2002–03	60	19	38	0	3	242	327	41	7th, Interior	did not qualify
2003–04	60	24	26	3	7	234	252	58	6th, Interior	Lost preliminary, 0–4 (Silverbacks)
2004–05	60	36	18	1	5	211	165	78	2nd of 8, Interior; 4th of 17, BCHL	Lost semifinals, 1–4 (Vipers)
2005–06	60	21	32	4	3	151	228	49	6th of 8, Interior; 13th of 17, BCHL	Lost preliminary, 1–4 (Vipers)
2006–07	60	34	19	2	5	211	186	75	5th of 9, Interior; 6th of 17, BCHL	Lost preliminary, 3–4 (Silverbacks)
2007–08	60	21	29	1	9	178	235	52	5th of 8, Interior; 11th of 16, BCHL	Lost in preliminary, 1–3 (Silverbacks)
2008–09	60	26	25	3	6	186	180	61	5th of 8, Interior; 7th of 16, BCHL	Lost division quarterfinals, 2–3 (Vees)
2009–10	60	18	37	1	4	210	270	41	8th of 9, Interior; 16th of 17, BCHL	did not qualify
2010–11	60	13	40	1	6	158	272	33	8th of 8, Interior; 16th of 16, BCHL	did not qualify
2011–12	60	33	21	2	4	218	185	72	3rd of 8, Interior; 7th of 16, BCHL	Lost 1st round, 0–4 (Centennials)
2012–13	56	25	22	1	8	170	185	59	3rd of 5, Coastal; 9th of 16, BCHL	Lost 1st round, 2–3 (Chiefs)
2013–14	58	32	20	4	2	192	158	70	2nd of 5, Coastal; 6th of 16, BCHL	Lost 1st round, 2–4 (Express)
2014–15	58	27	24	1	6	195	213	61	3rd of 5, Coastal; 11th of 16, BCHL	Won 1st round, 4-2 (Rivermen); Lost 2nd round, 0–4 (Chiefs)
2015–16	58	14	38	4	2	143	250	34	5th of 6, Coastal; 16th of 17, BCHL	did not qualify
2016–17	58	25	27	4	2	210	210	56	4th of 6, Coastal; 5th of 17, BCHL	Lost 1st round, 2–4 (Wild)
2017–18	58	33	17	4	4	170	138	74	1st of 5, Coastal; 4th of 17, BCHL	Won 1st round, 4-3 (Chiefs); Won 2nd round, 4-3 (Eagles); Won semi-finals, 4-1 (Kings); Lost finals, 1–4 (Wild)
2018–19	58	39	13	0	6	181	120	84	2nd of 5, Coastal; 6th of 17, BCHL	Won 1st round, 4-1 (Express); Won 2nd round, 4-0 (Chiefs); Won semi-finals, 4-0 (Grizzlies); Won finals, 4-0 (Vipers); Won Doyle Cup, 4-2 (Bandits); Lost nationals, 4-3 (Bandits)
2019–20	58	18	32	0	8	150	203	44	5th of 5, Coastal; 15th of 17, BCHL	Lost 1st round, 0–4 (Smoke Eaters)
2020–21	20	14	5	0	0	74	37	29	1st of 3, Chilliwack pod 3rd of 16, BCHL	Post-season cancelled
2021–22	54	27	15	0	4	168	129	66	4th of 9, Interior; 8th of 18, BCHL	Won 1st round, 4-2 (Bucks; Lost 2nd round, 4-0 (Vees)
2022–23	54	27	20	0	6	167	161	61	5th of 9, Interior; 9th of 18, BCHL	Lost 1st round, 4-0 (Silverbacks)
2023–24	54	16	35	0	3	148	236	35	8th of 8, Interior; 16th of 17, BCHL	Lost 1st round, 4-0 (Vees)
2024–25	54	23	25	4	2	176	193	52	8th of 10, Coastal; 15th of 21, BCHL	Lost Div Quarterfinal 3-4 (Chiefs)

== See also ==
- List of ice hockey teams in British Columbia
