= Kootenay International Junior Hockey League =

Defunct junior ice hockey league

- Countries: Canada; USA
- Founded: 1966
- Folded: 2026
- Recent champions: Grand Forks Border Bruins
- Most successful club: Cranbrook Colts
- Website: www.kijhl.ca

The Kootenay International Junior Hockey League (KIJHL) was a junior ice hockey league that operated in British Columbia and Washington (state) from 1966 to 2026. The KIJHL ceased operations in 2026 after all 22 of its member franchises withdrew from the league.

== History ==
=== Early history: 1966–1980 ===
The Kootenay International Junior Hockey League was founded in 1966 as the West Kootenay Junior Hockey League. Five teams joined the league in its first year and started play in the 1967–68 season. They included the Trail Jr. Smoke Eaters, the Nelson Plaza Oilers, the Castlegar Apollos, the Grand Forks Border Bruins, and the Rossland Warriors. The Smoke Eaters won the inaugural league championship, advancing to the provincial championship. Castlegar would withdraw from the league halfway through their fourth season, leaving only four teams. In 1971–1972, the Spokane Valley Kings and Cranbrook Colts joined the league, raising the number of teams to six, and incorporating an American team for the first time. Furthermore, the Nelson Plaza Oilers were renamed the Nelson Leafs. For 1972–73, the league was rebranded the Kootenay International Junior Hockey League. In this season, the Kimberley Knights joined the league, while the Grand Forks Border Bruins took a leave of absence. In 1973–74 the league expanded again, incorporating a Fernie-based team. The league did not expand for two years after this point, during a period dominated by the Colts. The next expansion occurred in 1976–77, when the Creston Clippers and the Castlegar Rebels joined the league, and the Rebels won the league championship in their debut season. Columbia Valley joined in 1978–79 season, thus bringing the league to a total of 11 teams, an all-time high.

=== 1980–1990 ===
In the 1981–82 season, Fernie would withdraw from the league, while the Elk Valley Raiders (Sparwood) would join in their place. The following year, the Beaver Valley Nitehawks would join, bringing the league to a total of 12 teams. Creston would withdraw from the league in 1985, and Nelson, Elk Valley and Grand Forks would do the same in 1986. Elk Valley and Grand Forks would return the next year and Nelson in 1989. The 1980s were largely dominated by the Cranbrook Colts with a 6 championship winning streak.

=== 1990–2000 ===
In 1990, the Rocky Mountain Junior Hockey League was formed, creating a level of competition between the two geographic rival leagues. Cranbrook and Kimberley would depart the league in 1991, while the Golden Rockets would enter. The Rossland Warriors would return to the league the following season after a lengthy absence. In 1993–94, the KIJHL gained two new teams in the form of the North Okanagan Kings and the Revelstoke Grizzlies. North Okanagan won the league title in their first year. The following year, Elk Valley and Nelson would depart the league, while the Sicamous Eagles would join. The Eagles, too, won the league in their debut season. In 1996–97, the Castlegar Rebels relocated to Osoyoos, who played one season under the Rebels name, before being renamed the Heat. Castlegar was granted an expansion franchise in 1998–99, who was named the Rebels. In 1999–2000, the Nelson Leafs rejoined the KIJHL, winning the title in their first season back, and the Rossland Warriors relocated for a single season to Summerland. The 1999–2000 Summerland Warriors had the distinction of never having won a game, finishing their only season with a record of 0-45-0, conceding 485 goals in 45 games.

=== 2000–2010 ===
The 2000–01 season saw the folding of the Summerland Warriors and the creation of the Creston Valley Thunder Cats. In 2001–02, the league was split from two to three divisions, the Neil Murdoch, Eddie Mountain, and Okanagan/Shushwap. Along with the division re-alignment, the North Okanagan Kings relocated to Enderby, becoming the Enderby Ice Kings. The Osoyoos Heat took on the name the Osoyoos Storm, and an expansion franchise was granted to Summerland, which took the name Summerland Sting. 2001–02 also saw the presence of the KIJHL's most accomplished alumnus, Shea Weber, who played for the league champions Sicamous Eagles for this single season. In 2002–03, the Princeton Posse joined the league, becoming the furthest west team in the KIJHL, and the Enderby Ice Kings folded after one season. In 2004–05, the Fernie Ghostriders joined the league from the North American Hockey League, and the following year the Golden Rockets were renamed the Golden Xtreme. They were renamed again the following year, this time becoming the Golden Jets. Also, 2006–07 saw the demise of the Osoyoos Storm, who moved to Kamloops Storm, while retaining the Storm name. In 2007–08, the league was divided into two conferences, which were furthermore split into two divisions each, dropping the Okanagan Shushwap, while creating the Eddie Mountain Conference, East and West Divisions, and likewise with the Neil Murdoch Conference. The Golden Xtreme was again renamed, this time reverting to the Rockets name. Furthermore, the Chase Chiefs joined the league in 2007–08, while the Fernie Ghostriders would capture the league title. There were no team changes in 2008–09, and the Nelson Leafs would capture the league title. In 2009–10, however, the Summerland Sting were forced to relocate to nearby Penticton, taking the name Penticton Lakers. Furthermore, an expansion team was granted to Armstrong, and the North Okanagan Knights were founded.

=== 2010–2020 ===
50 Years: 1966-2016

In the 2010–11 season, the Osoyoos Coyotes were formed, and won the league title in their debut season, while the Chase Chiefs relocated to Rutland, Kelowna to become the Kelowna Chiefs. The following year, two expansion franchises were granted to Chase and Summerland, and the Chase Heat and Summerland Steam were formed. The 2012–13 season saw no team changes, while the Castlegar Rebels won the league title. The following year, 2013–14, the Penticton Lakers were forced into relocation to 100 Mile House due to low ticket sales, which stemmed from playing in the neighbouring arena to that of the Jr. A Penticton Vees, whose national success offered difficult competition. The new team was branded the 100 Mile House Wranglers. The following year again saw no team changes, and the Kimberley Dynamiters won the league title. In 2015–16, the Grand Forks Border Bruins made the playoffs for the first time in 19 years, a provincial Jr. B record and the 100 Mile House Wranglers won the Keystone Cup; the Cyclone Taylor Cup and the KIJHL Championship in their third only season against the previous year's champion, the Dynamiters. The 2016–17 season marks the KIJHL's 50th anniversary, with the Creston Valley Thunder Cats hosting the Cyclone Taylor Cup. Prior to the 2019–20 KIJHL season, the Okanagan Division was renamed the Bill Ohlhausen Division along with the KIJHL Championship renamed the Teck Cup for sponsorship reasons.

=== 2020–2026 ===
The 2019–20 season was cut short and the Teck Cup was not awarded that year due to the COVID-19 pandemic. Jeff Dubois was named as commissioner. The Spokane Braves were forced to sit out the 2020–21, 2021–22 and 2022–23 seasons due to pandemic-related travel restrictions.

In the 2023–24 season, the league raised the maximum number of 20-year-old players from five to six per team.

In the 2024–25 season, the Summerland Steam franchise relocated to Williams Lake and became the Williams Lake Mustangs. The Merritt Centennials joined as an expansion team after its withdrawal from the BCHL. The North Okanagan Knights franchise relocated to Quesnel and became the Quesnel River Rush.

In 2025, the league announced that 11 of its 21 teams would be promoted to form a separate "Tier 1" division in the 2026–27 season. This was part of BC Hockey's plan to restructure its junior framework following the withdrawal of its only Junior A league. The years-long restructuring exercise began in 2023 with the level of play being promoted to Junior A Tier 2, followed by an independent evaluation of teams seeking to be promoted to Junior A Tier 1. It was expected that those teams promoted to Tier 1 would eventually apply for membership in the CJHL. The promoted teams would include the Beaver Valley Nitehawks, Columbia Valley Rockies, Fernie Ghostriders, Grand Forks Border Bruins, Kamloops Storm, Kimberley Dynamiters, Merritt Centennials, Nelson Leafs, Osoyoos Coyotes, Princeton Posse and Revelstoke Grizzlies. Seven other teams, including the 100 Mile House Wranglers, Quesnel River Rush, Sicamous Eagles, Williams Lake Mustangs, Castlegar Rebels, Creston Valley Thunder Cats and Kelowna Chiefs would be considered for possible promotion after further assessments. The announcement stated that the Chase Heat, Golden Rockets and Spokane Braves would remain at "Tier 2" through the 2026–27 season. On March 31 2026 the 100 Mile House Wranglers, Castlegar Rebels, Chase Heat, Creston Valley Thunder, Golden Rockets, Kelowna Chiefs, Sicamous Eagles, and Spokane Braves elected to go independent and form a new league, the Western International Junior Hockey League in response to an upcoming announcement from Hockey Canada regarding the Tier 1/Tier 2 system. It is currently unclear on which league the Summerland Jets will play in.

In 2026, eight franchises announced their withdrawal from the KIJHL to form the independently-sanctioned Western International Junior Hockey League (WIJHL). The seceding members included the 100 Mile House Wranglers, Castlegar Rebels, Chase Heat, Creston Valley Thunder Cats, Golden Rockets, Kelowna Chiefs, Sicamous Eagles and Spokane Braves. The remaining franchises were promoted to the newly-established British Columbia Hockey Conference (BCHC) Junior A league. Consequently, League Commissioner Jeff Dubois stated that "the KIJHL name and brand will go on a hiatus, at least for a season".

== Teck Cup champions ==
Year	Winning team	Losing team
1968	Trail Smoke Eaters	Rossland Warriors
1969	Nelson Leafs	Trail Smoke Eaters
1970	Trail Smoke Eaters	Rossland Warriors
1971	Trail Smoke Eaters	Rossland Warriors
1972	Trail Smoke Eaters	Rossland Warriors
1973	Cranbrook Colts	Rossland Warriors
1974	Cranbrook Colts	Grand Forks Border Bruins
1975	Cranbrook Colts	Trail Smoke Eaters
1976	Cranbrook Colts	Rossland Warriors
1977	Castlegar Rebels	Cranbrook Colts
1978	Castlegar Rebels	Creston Clippers
1979	Trail Smoke Eaters	Spokane Flames
1980	Kimberley Knights	Trail Smoke Eaters
1981	Trail Smoke Eaters	Cranbrook Colts
1982	Cranbrook Colts	Trail Smoke Eaters
1983	Cranbrook Colts	Trail Smoke Eaters
1984	Cranbrook Colts	Spokane Flames
1985	Cranbrook Colts	Trail Smoke Eaters
1986	Cranbrook Colts	Trail Smoke Eaters
1987	Cranbrook Colts	Castlegar Rebels
1988	Columbia Valley Rockies	Trail Smoke Eaters
1989	Columbia Valley Rockies	Nelson Leafs
1990	Columbia Valley Rockies	Nelson Leafs
1991	Trail Smoke Eaters	Columbia Valley Rockies
1992	Nelson Leafs	Spokane Braves
1993	Nelson Leafs	Columbia Valley Rockies
1994	North Okanagan Kings	Castlegar Rebels
1995	Sicamous Eagles	Castlegar Rebels
1996	Castlegar Rebels	Sicamous Eagles
1997	Beaver Valley Nitehawks	Columbia Valley Rockies
1998	Revelstoke Grizzlies	Osoyoos Rebels
1999	Beaver Valley Nitehawks	Revelstoke Grizzlies
2000	Nelson Leafs	Sicamous Eagles
2001	Beaver Valley Nitehawks	Revelstoke Grizzlies
2002	Sicamous Eagles	Beaver Valley Nitehawks
2003	Beaver Valley Nitehawks	Sicamous Eagles
2004	Beaver Valley Nitehawks	Columbia Valley Rockies
2005	Osoyoos Storm	Beaver Valley Nitehawks
2006	Sicamous Eagles	Beaver Valley Nitehawks
2007	Fernie Ghostriders	Nelson Leafs
2008	Fernie Ghostriders	Kamloops Storm
2009	Nelson Leafs	Kamloops Storm
2010	Revelstoke Grizzlies	Nelson Leafs
2011	Osoyoos Coyotes	Castlegar Rebels
2012	Beaver Valley Nitehawks	Kelowna Chiefs
2013	Castlegar Rebels	North Okanagan Knights
2014	Beaver Valley Nitehawks	Kamloops Storm
2015	Kimberley Dynamiters	Kamloops Storm
2016	100 Mile House Wranglers	Kimberley Dynamiters
2017	Beaver Valley Nitehawks	Chase Heat
2018	Kimberley Dynamiters	Revelstoke Grizzlies
2019	Revelstoke Grizzlies	Kimberley Dynamiters
2020	Not awarded (Note: Cancelled due to public health restrictions)	
2021	Not awarded	
2022	Revelstoke Grizzlies	Nelson Leafs
2023	Kimberley Dynamiters	Princeton Posse
2024	Revelstoke Grizzlies	Fernie Ghostriders
2025	Grand Forks Border Bruins	Revelstoke Grizzlies
2026	Kimberley Dynamiters	Princeton Posse

== NHL alumni ==
- Greg Adams
- Ron Areshenkoff
- Doug Barrault
- Kris Beech
- Drayson Bowman
- Steve Bozek
- Shane Churla
- Craig Cunningham
- Adam Deadmarsh
- Dallas Drake
- Wade Dubielewicz
- Andrew Ebbett
- Neil Eisenhut
- Ray Ferraro
- Rob Flockhart
- Travis Green
- Jamie Huscroft
- Barret Jackman
- Dane Jackson
- Steve Junker
- Alan Kerr
- Jon Klemm
- Chuck Kobasew
- Jeff Lank
- Tim Lenardon
- Scott Levins
- Bill Lindsay
- Jake Livingstone
- Jake Lucchini
- John Ludvig
- Brad Lukowich
- Jason Marshall
- Derek Mayer
- Steve McCarthy
- Glenn Merkosky
- David Oliver
- Scott Parker
- Steve Passmore
- Rudy Poeschek
- Craig Redmond
- Derek Ryan
- Kevin Sawyer
- Brian Skrudland
- Dan Smith
- Rob Tallas
- Steve Tambellini
- Gord Walker
- Shea Weber
- Mike Zanier

== See also ==
- List of ice hockey teams in British Columbia
