= Dawson Creek Kodiaks (PCJHL) =

- City: Dawson Creek, British Columbia, Canada
- League: Peace-Cariboo Junior Hockey League
- Operated: c. 1975-1990

Franchise history
- c. 1975-1980: Dawson Creek Canucks
- 1980-1990: Dawson Creek Kodiaks

The Dawson Creek Kodiaks were a Junior ice hockey team from Dawson Creek, British Columbia, Canada. They are former members of the Peace-Cariboo Junior Hockey League.

== History ==
The Dawson Creek Canucks were members of the Peace Junior B Hockey League. In 1975, the league expanded and became the Peace-Cariboo Junior B Hockey League.

In 1980, the Canucks became the Kodiaks and the league was promoted to Junior A. The Kodiaks stayed with the league until 1990 when they folded for the second time in three seasons. Their best season was 1982-83 when they finished second in the league with 24 wins in 40 games. They lost the PCJHL Cup league final 4-games-to-1 to the Williams Lake Mustangs.

The Kodiaks changed their name to the Dawson Creek Capitals in the 1985-1986 season. The Capitals eventually folded and were replaced in 1994 by the Dawson Creek Jr. Canucks in the North West Junior Hockey League. The Kodiaks were replaced at the Junior A level in 2010 by the Dawson Creek Rage of the North American Hockey League.

== Season-by-season standings ==
| Season | GP | W | L | T | OTL | GF | GA | P | Results | Playoffs |
| 1975-76 | 39 | 6 | 32 | 1 | - | 121 | 266 | 13 | 5th PC Jr. B | DNQ |
| 1976-77 | 40 | 18 | 21 | 1 | - | 212 | 216 | 37 | 3rd PC Jr. B | |
| 1977-78 | 40 | 18 | 22 | 0 | - | 209 | 227 | 36 | 4th PC Jr. B | |
| 1978-79 | 36 | 22 | 14 | 0 | - | 238 | 165 | 44 | 3rd PC Jr. B | |
| 1979-80 | 48 | 28 | 18 | 2 | - | 294 | 275 | 58 | 4th PC Jr. B | Lost quarter-final |
| 1980-81 | 40 | 22 | 17 | 1 | - | 226 | 197 | 45 | 3rd PCJHL | Lost quarter-final |
| 1981-82 | 56 | 31 | 25 | 0 | - | 370 | 315 | 62 | 3rd PCJHL | Lost quarter-final |
| 1982-83 | 40 | 24 | 16 | 0 | - | 238 | 224 | 48 | 2nd PCJHL | Lost final |
| 1983-84 | 50 | 11 | 38 | 1 | - | 209 | 339 | 23 | 6th PCJHL | DNQ |
| 1984-85 | 48 | 9 | 39 | 0 | - | 183 | 375 | 18 | 5th PCJHL | DNQ |
| 1985-86 | 50 | 17 | 32 | 1 | - | 226 | 312 | 35 | 5th PCJHL | DNQ |
| 1986-87 | 48 | 14 | 34 | 0 | - | 196 | 267 | 28 | 5th PCJHL | DNQ |
| 1987-88 | 30 | 11 | 19 | 0 | - | 114 | 180 | 22 | 5th PCJHL | Folded |
| 1988-89 | 52 | 13 | 39 | 0 | - | 190 | 371 | 26 | 5th PCJHL | DNQ |
| 1989-90 | 49 | 2 | 47 | 0 | - | 141 | 500 | 4 | 5th PCJHL | Folded |

=== Playoffs ===
- 1981 Lost semi-final

Prince George Spruce Kings defeated Dawson Creek Kodiaks 4-games-to-2

- 1982 Lost semi-final

Grande Prairie North Stars defeated Dawson Creek Kodiaks 4-games-to-none

- 1983 Lost final

Williams Lake Mustangs defeated Dawson Creek Kodiaks 3-games-to-1
Dawson Creek Canucks defeated Prince George Spruce Kings 3-games-to-2
Williams Lake Mustangs defeated Dawson Creek Kodiaks 4-games-to-1

- 1984 DNQ
- 1985 DNQ
- 1986 DNQ
- 1987 DNQ
- 1988 Did Not Finish Season
- 1989 DNQ
- 1990 Did Not Finish Season
