= Dean Malkoc =

Canadian ice hockey player (born 1970)

- Born: January 26, 1970 (age 56) Vancouver, British Columbia, Canada
- Height: 6 ft 3 in (191 cm)
- Weight: 210 lb (95 kg; 15 st 0 lb)
- Position: Defence
- Shot: Left
- Played for: Vancouver Canucks; Boston Bruins; New York Islanders
- NHL draft: 95th overall, 1990; New Jersey Devils
- Playing career: 1990–2005

Dean Malkoc (born January 26, 1970) is a Canadian former professional ice hockey player who spent four seasons in the National Hockey League between 1995 and 1999 with the Vancouver Canucks, Boston Bruins, and New York Islanders. The rest of his career was spent in the minor leagues, in particular the American Hockey League.

== Playing career ==
A tough, physical defender, Malkoc was selected 95th overall in the 1990 NHL entry draft by the New Jersey Devils. He turned professional in 1991 and spent four seasons in the Devils' system, earning a reputation for his robust play and high penalty minute totals, but never played an NHL game for New Jersey.

Malkoc became a free agent in 1995 and signed with the Vancouver Canucks, his hometown team. He managed to crack the Canucks' roster, and spent the entire 1995–96 season in the NHL as the team's seventh defender, appearing in 41 games and recording 2 assists along with 136 penalty minutes.

At the outset of the 1996–97 season, Malkoc was exposed by Vancouver in the NHL waiver draft, and claimed by the Boston Bruins. He spent two full seasons in Boston as a utility defender, appearing in 73 games. In 1997–98, he scored his first NHL goal in his third season in the league.

Malkoc signed with the New York Islanders for the 1998–99 campaign, but only appeared in two games for the Islanders and found himself back in the minors. He was dealt to the Mighty Ducks of Anaheim the following season, and spent two seasons in the Ducks' organization without appearing in an NHL game, before retiring. He made a brief comeback to play in Austria in 2004–05 before leaving the game.

Malkoc appeared in 116 NHL games, recording one goal and three assists for four points along with 299 penalty minutes. His lone NHL goal came as a member of the Boston Bruins. It was the Bruins' fifth goal in their 10–5 loss to the Florida Panthers on November 26, 1997. He is currently a scout for the Boston Bruins.

== Post-playing career ==
After retiring, Malkoc became a scout for the Boston Bruins in 2007.

== Career statistics ==
=== Regular season and playoffs ===
| | | | Regular season | | | | | Playoffs |
| Season | Team | League | GP | G | A | Pts | PIM | GP | G | A | Pts | PIM |
|---|---|---|---|---|---|---|---|---|---|---|---|---|
| 1987–88 | Williams Lake Mustangs | PCJHL | 55 | 6 | 32 | 38 | 215 | — | — | — | — | — |
| 1988–89 | Powell River Paper Kings | BCJHL | 55 | 10 | 32 | 42 | 370 | — | — | — | — | — |
| 1989–90 | Kamloops Blazers | WHL | 48 | 3 | 18 | 21 | 209 | 17 | 0 | 3 | 3 | 56 |
| 1990–91 | Kamloops Blazers | WHL | 8 | 1 | 4 | 5 | 47 | — | — | — | — | — |
| 1990–91 | Swift Current Broncos | WHL | 56 | 10 | 23 | 33 | 248 | 3 | 0 | 2 | 2 | 5 |
| 1990–91 | Utica Devils | AHL | 1 | 0 | 0 | 0 | 0 | — | — | — | — | — |
| 1991–92 | Utica Devils | AHL | 66 | 1 | 11 | 12 | 274 | 4 | 0 | 2 | 2 | 6 |
| 1992–93 | Utica Devils | AHL | 73 | 5 | 19 | 24 | 255 | 5 | 0 | 1 | 1 | 8 |
| 1993–94 | Albany River Rats | AHL | 79 | 0 | 9 | 9 | 296 | 5 | 0 | 0 | 0 | 21 |
| 1994–95 | Albany River Rats | AHL | 9 | 0 | 1 | 1 | 52 | — | — | — | — | — |
| 1994–95 | Indianapolis Ice | IHL | 62 | 1 | 3 | 4 | 193 | — | — | — | — | — |
| 1995–96 | Vancouver Canucks | NHL | 41 | 0 | 2 | 2 | 136 | — | — | — | — | — |
| 1996–97 | Boston Bruins | NHL | 33 | 0 | 0 | 0 | 70 | — | — | — | — | — |
| 1996–97 | Providence Bruins | NHL | 4 | 0 | 2 | 2 | 28 | — | — | — | — | — |
| 1997–98 | Boston Bruins | NHL | 40 | 1 | 0 | 1 | 86 | — | — | — | — | — |
| 1998–99 | Lowell Lock Monsters | AHL | 61 | 2 | 8 | 10 | 193 | 3 | 0 | 0 | 0 | 8 |
| 1998–99 | New York Islanders | NHL | 2 | 0 | 1 | 1 | 7 | — | — | — | — | — |
| 1999–00 | Chicago Wolves | IHL | 62 | 2 | 8 | 10 | 130 | 1 | 0 | 0 | 0 | 0 |
| 2000–01 | Cincinnati Mighty Ducks | AHL | 65 | 1 | 4 | 5 | 232 | 4 | 0 | 0 | 0 | 6 |
| 2004–05 | Villacher SV | AUT | 20 | 0 | 2 | 2 | 54 | — | — | — | — | — |
| AHL totals | | | 358 | 9 | 54 | 63 | 1330 | 21 | 0 | 3 | 3 | 49 |
| NHL totals | | | 116 | 1 | 3 | 4 | 299 | — | — | — | — | — |
