= Pacific Northwest Hockey League =

Canadian ice hockey league (1965–1982)

- Sport: Ice hockey
- Founded: 1965
- Folded: 1982
- No. of teams: Varying per season
- Countries: Canada
- Most titles: Houston Luckies (5)
- Broadcaster: Channel 3

The Pacific Northwest Hockey League (PNWHL) was a Canadian junior ice hockey and semi-professional hockey league in British Columbia from 1965 to 1982. The Fowler Cup was awarded annually to the league champion at the end of each season. The PNWHL had two play levels: Junior and Intermediate.

The PNWHL has had varying season lengths, in September 1974, the league shortened the intermediate season from 40 to 32 games to accommodate working-class players, while extending the junior season from 32 to 40 games. As a result, league standings switched from the traditional point system to the win-loss percentage system.

The PNWHL was broadcast on Channel 3.

== League champions ==
Season	Champion
1965–66	Smithers Totems
1966–67	Burns Lake Braves
1967–68	Smithers Bruins
1968–69	Smithers Bruins
1969–70	Smithers Totem-Blues
1970–71	Houston Luckies
1971–72	Houston Luckies
1972–73	Smithers Nats
1973–74	Houston Luckies
1974–75	Houston Luckies
1975–76	Houston Luckies
1976–77	Prince Rupert Kings
1977–78	Burns Lake Braves
1978–79	Prince Rupert Halibut Kings
1979–80	Prince Rupert Kings
1980–81	Vanderhoof Flyers
1981–82	Vanderhoof Flyers
