= Nelson Leafs =

Canadian junior ice hockey team

- City: Nelson, British Columbia
- League: KIJHL (1999-2026); BCHC (2026-present)
- Division: Kootenay
- Founded: 1968–69 (KHL)
- Home arena: Nelson and District Community Complex (capacity: 1472)
- Colours: Green and white
- Mascot: Bud the Bear
- President: Corey Viala
- General manager: Dale Hladun
- Head coach: Gianni Mangone
- Captain: Vacant
- Website: www.nelsonleafs.ca

Franchise history
- 1968–1971: Nelson JR. Maple Leafs (KHL/WKHL)
- 1971–1994: Nelson Maple Leafs (KIJHL)
- 1994–1999: Nelson Leafs (RMJHL)
- 1999–2026: Nelson Leafs (KIJHL)
- 2026-present: Nelson Leafs (BCHC)

The Nelson Leafs are a Junior 'A' ice hockey team based in Nelson, British Columbia, Canada. They are set to compete in the Kootenay Division in the British Columbia Hockey Conference (BCHC) beginning in the 2026–27 season after playing in the Kootenay International Junior Hockey League (KIJHL). They play their home games at Nelson and District Community Complex.

== History ==
The team was originally known as the Nelson Maple Leafs but changed its name to the Leafs in 1994 when it joined the Rocky Mountain Junior Hockey League (RMJHL). The team returned to the KIJHL in 1999 but continued to be known as the Leafs.

The Leafs are the 1968-69, 1991–92, 1992–93, 1999-00, 2008–09 KIJHL champions.

In the 2006-07 season, the Leafs made it to the KIJHL finals, but lost to the Fernie Ghostriders 4-2. In the 2008-09 season, the Leafs won the KIJHL championship 4-0 over the Kamloops Storm. Then in the 2009-10 season, the Leafs went to the KIJHL finals, but lost 4-1 to the Revelstoke Grizzlies.

The Leafs hosted the Cyclone Taylor Cup, the Junior B provincial championship, in April 2014 but finished fourth.

On April 20, 2026, the Leafs were named as one of 22 teams joining the BCHC, leaving the KIJHL with the remaining 12 teams.

== Season-by-season record ==
Note: GP = Games played, W = Wins, L = Losses, T = Ties, OTL = Overtime losses, SOL = Shootout losses, D = Defaults, Pts = Points, GF = Goals for, GA = Goals against

Records as of February 17, 2024.

Season	GP	W	L	T	OTL	Pts	GF	GA	Finish	Playoffs
1969–70	32	13	19	0	—	26	165	179	3rd, KHL	
1970–71	28	11	17	0	—	22	—	—	3rd, WKHL	
1971–72	32	11	21	0	—	22	129	198	4th, WKHL	
1972–73	30	6	22	2	—	14	109	251	3rd, West	
1973–74*	16	0	16	0	—	0	39	163	4th, West	Did not participate (withdrew)
1974–75	34	7	27	0	—	14	120	238	4th, West	
1975–76	34	13	21	0	—	26	139	184	3rd, West	
1976–77	44	21	22	1	—	43	190	213	4th, West	
1977–78	42	14	28	0	—	28	166	240	4th, West	
1978–79	40	11	28	1	—	23	151	227	5th, West	
1979–80	40	19	21	0	—	38	200	272	3rd, West	
1980–81	40	17	23	0	—	34	197	209	3rd, West	
1981–82	42	27	15	0	—	54	279	218	2nd, West	
1982–83	42	15	27	0	—	30	238	264	4th, West	
1983–84	40	15	25	0	—	30	209	277	6th, West	
1984–85	40	19	20	1	—	39	236	228	4th, West	
1985–86*	34	3	30	1	—	7	161	324	6th, West	Did not participate (withdrew)
1986–88*	Did not participate (folded)									
1988–89	45	40	4	1	—	81	373	163	1st, West	Lost in finals (Rockies)
1989–90	40	36	3	1	—	73	298	122	1st, West	Lost in finals (Rockies)
1990–91*	41	25	15	1	—	51	201	159	2nd, West	
1991–92	38	30	6	2	—	62	250	107	1st, West	KIJHL champions (Braves)
1992–93	42	27	14	1	—	55	293	139	3rd, West	KIJHL champions (Rockies)
1993–94	40	27	12	1	—	55	279	181	2nd, West	
Season	GP	W	L	T	SOL	Pts	GF	GA	Finish	Playoffs
1994–95	52	37	13	—	2	76	287	233	1st, Kootenay	Lost in division semifinals, 0-4 (Thunder)
1995–96	58	33	23	—	2	68	234	236	2nd, Kootenay	Lost in division semifinals, 0-4 (Ghostriders)
1996–97	60	31	23	—	6	68	271	273	2nd, RMJHL	Lost in semifinals, 0-4 (Colts)
1997–98	54	20	31	—	3	43	258	272	5th, RMJHL	Lost in semifinals, 0-4 (Dynamiters)
1998–99	45	20	25	—	0	40	190	195	3rd, RMJHL	Lost in semifinals, 3-4 (Ghostriders)
Season	GP	W	L	T	OTL	Pts	GF	GA	Finish	Playoffs
1999–00	45	29	11	5	—	65	236	138	1st, Neil Murdoch	KIJHL champions (Eagles)
2000–01	58	27	24	4	3	61	237	237	4th, Neil Murdoch	Lost in division semifinals, 0-4 (Nitehawks)
2001–02	50	19	22	5	4	47	172	199	3rd, Neil Murdoch	Lost in division semifinals, 1-4 (Rebels)
2002–03	50	24	23	3	0	51	203	202	2nd, Neil Murdoch	Lost in division finals, 3-4 (Nitehawks)
2003–04	50	25	21	3	1	54	228	208	3rd, Neil Murdoch	Lost in division semifinals, 0-4 (Braves)
2004–05	50	18	26	4	2	42	167	194	4th, Neil Murdoch	Lost in division semifinals, 0-4 (Nitehawks)
2005–06	50	24	17	6	3	57	208	169	3rd, Neil Murdoch	Lost in division finals, 0-4 (Nitehawks)
2006–07	52	40	10	2	0	82	253	163	1st, Neil Murdoch	Lost in finals, 2–4 (Ghostriders)
2007–08	52	32	11	9	0	73	214	162	1st, Neil Murdoch: West	Lost in division finals, 3-4 (Nitehawks)
2008–09	52	43	7	2	0	88	248	128	1st, Neil Murdoch	KIJHL champions, 4-0 (Storm)
2009–10	50	36	10	2	2	76	247	128	1st, Neil Murdoch	Lost in finals, 1–4 (Grizzlies)
2010–11	50	25	22	0	3	53	173	187	3rd, Neil Murdoch	Lost in division semifinals, 3–4 (Nitehawks)
2011–12	52	30	17	0	5	65	259	167	3rd, Neil Murdoch	Lost in division semifinals, 1-4 (Rebels)
2012–13	52	32	16	2	2	68	207	158	3rd, Neil Murdoch	Lost in division semifinals, 2-4 (Nitehawks)
2013–14	52	38	9	1	4	81	247	161	1st, Neil Murdoch	Lost in division finals, 2-4 (Nitehawks)
2014–15	52	23	23	2	4	52	173	145	4th, Neil Murdoch	Lost in division semifinals, 1-4 (Nitehawks)
2015–16	52	20	29	1	2	42	143	178	4th, Neil Murdoch	Lost in division semifinals, 0-4 (Nitehawks)
2016–17	47	21	21	1	4	47	148	160	3rd of 5 Neil Murdoch; 11th of 20 - KIJHL	Lost in Division Semifinals, 0-4 (Nitehawks)
2017–18	47	33	9	2	3	71	164	101	1st of 5 Neil Murdoch; 3rd of 20 - KIJHL	Lost in Conf. Finals, 2-4 (Dynamiters)
2018–19	49	35	11	2	1	72	200	130	1st of 5 Neil Murdoch; 4th of 20 - KIJHL	Lost Divisional Finals, 2-4 (Nitehawks)
2019–20	49	30	13	0	6	66	199	156	2nd of 5, Neil Murdoch; 6 of 20 KIJHL	Won Div Semifinals, 4-0, (Braves); Incomplete Div Final 2-0 (Nitehawks); Playoffs cancelled due to covid-19
2020–21	3	3	0	0	0	6	24	7	1st of 5, Neil Murdoch	Rest of season cancelled due to covid-19
2021–22	42	31	10	0	1	63	171	93	1st of 5, Neil Murdoch; 4th of 19 KIJHL	Lost League Final, 1-4, (Grizzlies)
2022 - 23	44	24	15	-	5	53	150	137	2nd, Neil Murdoch	Lost Div Semifinals, 2-4, (Nitehawks)
2023–24	44	24	17	3	—	51	167	159	3rd of 5, Neil Murdoch; 10th of 20 KIJHL	Lost Div Semifinals, 1-4, (Border Bruins)
2024–25	44	19	23	1	1	40	142	190	3rd of 5, Neil Murdoch; 7th of 10 Kootenay Conf; 14th of 21 KIJHL	Lost Div Semifinals, 0-4, (Nitehawks)

Notes

1. 1973-74 season: Nelson withdrew from play for balance of season
2. 1985-86 season: Nelson withdrew on January 15, 1986
3. 1986-87 and 1987-88 seasons: Nelson did not participate (folded)
4. Stats for the 1990-91 season are only thru February 17, 1991. May not be complete

=== Playoffs ===
Records as of February 27, 2024.

Season	1st round	2nd round	3rd Round	Finals
1994–95	L, 0-4, Creston Valley	—	—	—
1995–96	L, 0-4, Fernie	—	—	—
1996–97	W, 4-3, Creston Valley	L, 0-4, Cranbrook	—	—
1997–98	W, 2-0, Castlegar	L, 0-4, Kimberley	—	—
1998–99	L, 3-4, Fernie	—	—	—
1999–00	W, 4-2, Castlegar	W, Beaver Valley	—	W, Sicamous
2000–01	L, 0-4, Beaver Valley	—	—	—
2001–02	L, 1-4, Castlegar	—	—	—
2002–03	W, 4-2, Spokane	L, 3-4, Beaver Valley	—	—
2003–04	L, 3-4, Spokane	—	—	—
2004–05	L, 0-4, Beaver Valley	—	—	—
2005–06	W, 4-1, Castlegar	L, 0-4, Beaver Valley	—	—
2006–07	W, 4-0, Spokane	W, 4-2, Beaver Valley	Bye	L, 2-4, Fernie
2007–08	Bye	L, 3-4, Beaver Valley	—	—
2008–09	W, 4-1, Spokane	W, 4-0, Castlegar	W, 3-0, Fernie	W, 4-0, Kamloops
2009–10	W, 4-3, Beaver Valley	W, 4-3 Spokane	W, 4-1 Fernie	L, 1-4 Revelstoke
2010–11	L, 3-4, Beaver Valley	—	—	—
2011–12	L, 1-4, Castlegar	—	—	—
2012–13	L, 1-4, Beaver Valley	—	—	—
2013–14	W, 4-2, Spokane	L, 2-4, Beaver Valley	—	—
2014–15	L, 1-4, Beaver Valley	—	—	—
2015–16	L, 0-4, Beaver Valley	—	—	—
2016–17	W, 4-2, Castlegar	L, 0-4, Beaver Valley	—	—
2017–18	W, 4-1, Grand Forks	W, 4-1, Castlegar	L, 2-4, Kimberley	—
2018–19	W, 4-3, Spokane	L, 2-4, Beaver Valley	—	—
2019-20	W, 4-0 Spokane	Incomplete, 2-0, Beaver Valley	—	—
2020-21	Playoffs cancelled due to coronavirus pandemic			
2021-22	W, 4-3 Castelgar	W, 4-2 Beaver Valley	W, 4-2 Kimberley	L, 1-4 Revelstoke
2022-23	L, 2-4, Beaver Valley	—	—	—
2023-24	L, 1-4, Grand Forks	—	—	—
2024-25	L, 0-4, Beaver Valley	—	—	—

Notes

1. The RMJHL playoffs had three playoff rounds.
2. The final 1998-99 RMJHL playoffs had two playoff rounds.

=== Cyclone Taylor Cup ===
Season	Round Robin	Semifinals	Finals
1999–00	no round robin	W, 2-1, CRS	L, 0-2, ABB
2008–09	record unavailable advance to championship game	—	L, 2-6, RIC
2013–14	Tournament host (0-2-1) relegated to consolation game	L, 0-3, VIC	—

== NHL alumni ==
- Geoff Kinrade
- Greg Adams
- Simon Wheeldon
- Isaac MacLeod
- Bob Fitchner
- Steve Kozari
- Pat Price
- Brad Larsen
- Rob Tallas
- Sergei Varlamov

== Other notable alumni ==
- Nyjer Morgan

== Awards and trophies ==
Most Sportsmanlike

- Chris Cucullu: 2009-2010
- Mike Lebler: 2006-2007
- Lindon Horswill: 2011-12

Top Goaltender

- Billy Faust: 2009-2010
- Garrett Beckwith: 2008-2009

Rookie of the Year

- Dylan Walchuk: 2008-2009
- Nik Newman: 2011-12

Coach of the Year

- Simon Wheeldon: 2008-2009
- Simon Wheeldon: 2007-2008
- Simon Wheeldon: 2006-2007

Top Defenseman

- Torin Brusven: 2007-2008
- Jonathon Petrash: 2011-12

Top Scorer

- Dan Fraser: 2006-2007
- Nik Newman 2011-12
