= Quesnel Millionaires =

- City: Quesnel, British Columbia, Canada
- League: British Columbia Hockey League; Rocky Mountain Junior Hockey League; Peace-Cariboo Junior Hockey League
- Conference: Interior
- Operated: 1975-2011
- Home arena: Quesnel Twin Arena
- Colours: Blue, White, and Black
- General manager: (Canada) Doug Hedley
- Head coach: (Canada) Doug Hedley
- Website: www.quesnelmillionaires.com/

Franchise history
- 1975-1986 1989-2011: Quesnel Millionaires
- 1987-1988: Quesnel Blades
- 2011-Present: Chilliwack Chiefs

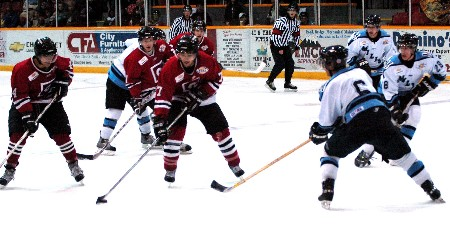
2007 regular season game against the Merritt Centennials

The Quesnel Millionaires were a junior "A" ice hockey team based in Quesnel, British Columbia, Canada. They were members of the Interior Conference of the British Columbia Hockey League (BCHL). They played their home games at Quesnel Twin Arena. The ownership group accepted an offer from the Chiefs Development group to move them to Chilliwack to play in Prospera Centre as of 2011 which was vacated after the Chilliwack Bruins were sold and moved to Victoria, BC. They are now known as the Chilliwack Chiefs.

== History ==
Mills Logo

The Millionaires started out in the Peace Cariboo Junior Hockey League in 1975. The Millionaires are the 1977, 1978, 1979, and 1987 PCJHL Champions. They have also won the 1977, 1978, and 1979 Cyclone Taylor Cup Championships. In 1978, the Millionaires also won the Western Canada Junior B championship, defeating the North Saskatchewan Junior B Hockey League's Saskatoon Quakers 2-games-to-none. In 1996, the Millionaires moved to the British Columbia Hockey League.

On May 9, 2011, the BCHL approved the sale of the Quesnel Millionaires to the Chiefs Development Group in Chilliwack, BC. The former Chiefs franchise was renamed the Langley Rivermen in preparation for the Millionaires' return to Chilliwack.

== Season-by-season record ==
Note: GP = Games Played, W = Wins, L = Losses, T = Ties, OTL = Overtime Losses, GF = Goals for, GA = Goals against

Season	GP	W	L	T	OTL	GF	GA	Points	Finish	Playoffs
1975-76	40	20	19	1	-	210	199	41	3rd, PC Jr. B	Lost in Semifinals, 3-4 (North Stars)
1976-77	40	27	13	0	-	205	168	58	1st, PC Jr. B	PCJHL Champions; Cyclone Taylor Cup Champions
1977-78	40	37	3	0	-	292	120	74	1st, PC Jr. B	PCJHL Champions; Cyclone Taylor Cup Champions; Western Canada Junior B Champions
1978-79	36	30	6	0	-	267	125	60	1st, PC Jr. B	PCJHL Champions; Cyclone Taylor Cup Champions
1979-80	48	29	18	1	-	248	193	59	2nd, PC Jr. B	Lost in Quarterfinals, 2-4 (North Stars)
1980-81	40	25	14	1	-	225	181	51	2nd, PCJHL	Lost in Semifinals, 1-4 (Golden Hawks)
1981-82	56	12	44	0	-	267	498	24	5th, PCJHL	Did not qualify
1982-83	40	23	17	0	-	261	254	46	3rd, PCJHL	Lost in Semifinals, 0-3 (Mustangs)
1983-84	50	21	28	1	-	239	279	43	4th, PCJHL	Lost in Semifinals, 1-4 (Spruce Kings)
1984-85	Did Not Participate									
1985-86	50	6	44	0	-	170	403	12	6th, PCJHL	Did not qualify
1986-87	48	27	20	1	-	234	218	55	4th, PCJHL	PCJHL Champions, 4-2 (North Stars)
1987-88	50	35	15	0	-	332	265	70	2nd, PCJHL	Lost in Semifinals, 0-4 (Spruce Kings)
1988-89	52	9	43	0	-	148	396	18	6th, PCJHL	Did not qualify
1989-90	52	24	26	2	-	284	323	50	4th, PCJHL	Lost in Semifinals, 0-4 (Huskies)
1990-91	54	5	49	0	-	141	400	10	4th, PCJHL	* Lost in Semifinals, by DQ (Spruce Kings)
1991-92	52	15	37	0	-	233	328	30	4th, Peace-Cariboo	Lost in Quarterfinals, 0-4 (Spruce Kings)
1992-93	52	18	33	-	1	208	272	37	4th, Peace-Cariboo	Lost in Quarterfinals, 0-4 (Mustangs)
1993-94	52	9	39	-	4	187	290	22	5th, Peace-Cariboo	Did not qualify
1994-95	52	17	32	-	3	221	314	37	5th, Peace-Cariboo	Did not qualify
1995-96	58	21	37	-	0	253	346	42	4th, Peace-Cariboo	Lost in Semifinals, 1-4 (Spruce Kings)
1996-97	60	6	52	2	-	197	402	14	6th, Interior	Did not qualify
1997-98	60	21	37	2	-	220	329	44	6th, Interior	Did not qualify
1998-99	60	23	36	-	1	222	342	47	5th, Interior	Did not qualify
1999-00	60	19	36	-	5	203	277	43	5th, Interior	Did not qualify
2000-01	60	25	25	-	10	229	244	60	4th, Interior	Lost in Quarterfinals, 1-4 (Panthers)
2001-02	60	24	30	-	6	253	307	54	5th, Interior	Lost in Preliminary, 0-4 (Panthers)
2002-03	60	23	30	2	5	232	270	53	5th, Interior	Lost in Preliminary, 3-4 (Silverbacks)
2003-04	60	10	45	1	4	143	287	25	8th, Interior	Did not qualify
2004-05	60	21	29	2	8	177	256	52	8th, Interior	Did not qualify
2005-06	60	8	41	2	9	142	278	27	8th, Interior	Did not qualify
2006-07	60	8	47	0	5	149	305	21	9th, Interior	Did not qualify
2007-08	60	19	36	0	5	175	254	43	7th, Interior	Did not qualify
2008-09	60	16	40	0	4	160	268	36	7th, Interior	Did not qualify
2009-10	60	22	32	0	6	208	245	50	5th, Interior	Lost in Division Semifinals, 2-4 (Vipers)
2010-11	60	13	38	3	6	140	250	35	7th, Interior	Lost Division Quarter-final

* Prince George Spruce Kings receive bye. Quesnel Millionaires disqualified from playoffs over a missed regular season game.

=== Playoffs ===
- 1981 Lost semi-final

Fort St. John Golden Hawks defeated Quesnel Millionaires 4-games-to-1

- 1982 DNQ
- 1983 Lost semi-final

Quesnel Millionaires defeated Prince George Spruce Kings 3-games-to-1
Williams Lake Mustangs defeated Quesnel Millionaires 3-games-to-none

- 1984 Lost semi-final

Prince George Spruce Kings defeated Quesnel Millionaires 4-games-to-1

- 1985 Did Not Participate
- 1986 DNQ
- 1987 Won League, lost Mowat Cup

Quesnel Millionaires defeated Prince George Spruce Kings 4-games-to-2
Quesnel Millionaires defeated Grande Prairie North Stars 4-games-to-2 PCJHL CHAMPIONS
Richmond Sockeyes defeated Quesnel Millionaires 2-games-to-none

- 1988 Lost semi-final

Prince George Spruce Kings defeated Quesnel Millionaires 4-games-to-none

- 1989 DNQ
- 1990 Lost semi-final

Fort St. John Huskies defeated Quesnel Millionaires 4-games-to-none

- 1991 Disqualified from Playoffs
- 1992 Lost quarter-final

Prince George Spruce Kings defeated Quesnel Millionaires 4-games-to-none

- 1993 Lost quarter-final

Williams Lake Mustangs defeated Quesnel Millionaires 4-games-to-none

- 1994 DNQ
- 1995 DNQ
- 1996 Lost semi-final

Quesnel Millionaires defeated Grande Prairie Storm 4-games-to-2
Prince George Spruce Kings defeated Quesnel Millionaires 4-games-to-1

== NHL alumni ==
- Carey Price
- Sheldon Souray
- Gilbert Brule
- Brett Festerling
- Trevor Smith
- Tyson Marsh
- Link Gaetz
- Brad Gassoff
- Jamie Leach
- Terry Ryan
- Brock Hooten

== Awards and trophies ==
Joe Tennant Memorial Trophy

- Barry Wolff: 1998

Bob Fenton Trophy

- Trevor Hertz: 2010
- Jamie Molendyk: 2002

Bruce Allison Memorial Trophy

- Gilbert Brule: 2003

== See also ==
- List of ice hockey teams in British Columbia
