= Western International Junior Hockey League =

Junior ice hockey league

- Countries: Canada; USA
- Founded: 1 June 2026
- First season: 2026–27
- No. of teams: 10
- Feeder to: BCHL
- Website: wijhl.com

The Western International Junior Hockey League (WIJHL) is a junior ice hockey league in British Columbia, Canada and Washington, USA. The league was founded in 2026 by eight former members of the Kootenay International Junior Hockey League (KIJHL). As an independent league, the WIJHL is not associated with governing bodies such as Hockey Canada or BC Hockey.

2026-27 WIJHL teams
| Team | City | Arena |
Northern Division
| 100 Mile House Wranglers | 100 Mile House, BC | South Cariboo Recreation Centre |
| Chase Heat | Chase, BC | Art Holding Memorial Arena |
| Enderby Icemen | Enderby, BC | John Pritchard Memorial Arena |
| Golden Rockets | Golden, BC | Golden District Centennial Arena |
| Sicamous Eagles | Sicamous, BC | Sicamous & District Rec Centre |
Southern Division
| Castlegar Rebels | Castlegar, BC | Castlegar District Rec Centre |
| Creston Valley Thunder | Creston, BC | Johnny Bucyk Arena |
| Kelowna Chiefs | Rutland, BC | Rutland Arena |
| Oliver Outlaws | Oliver, BC | Oliver & District Arena |
| Spokane Braves | Spokane, WA | Eagles Ice Arena |

When the league was first announced only the eight former KIJHL franchises were announced, however late on May 20th rumors began circulating that the Enderby Icemen would join the league as an expansion franchise, rumors that were confirmed the next day. A tenth club was rumored to join the league, with the rumors being confirmed June 12 as Oliver was granted a franchise, later announced as the Outlaws.

On July 3rd 2026 the division alignments were announced with five teams competing in each the North and South Divisions. The inaugural season will begin on Friday September 18th 2026, and will run until the end of February

== Sources ==
- Hector, Calvin (31 March 2026). "Kelowna Chiefs say goodbye to KIJHL: Join new Western International Junior Hockey League". am1150.ca. Vista Radio.
- "Breakaway junior hockey league to reshape Kootenay teams". mynelsonnow.com. Vista Radio. 31 March 2026.
- "WIJHL Information Hub". wijhl.com. Western International Junior Hockey League. 1 April 2026.
- Dickson, Courtney (2 April 2026). "8 teams leave KIJHL to start independent league". CBC News. CBC/Radio-Canada.
- Bailey, Jim (2 April 2026). "Update: BCHL sees possible affiliation with new WIJHL". Castlegar News.
