= Spokane Braves =

American junior ice hockey team

- City: Spokane, Washington
- League: WIJHL
- Division: Southern
- Founded: 1971
- Home arena: Eagles Ice Arena
- Colors: Goal red Union blue
- General manager: Bob Tobiason
- Head coach: Jason Greenwell
- Website: spokanebraves.com

Franchise history
- 1971–1972: Spokane Valley Kings
- 1972–1975: Spokane Rockets
- 1975–1985: Spokane Flames
- Since 1985: Spokane Braves

Previous franchise history
- 1971–2026: KIJHL

The Spokane Braves are a junior ice hockey club and franchise of the Western International Junior Hockey League (WIJHL). The team plays its home games at the Eagles Ice Arena in Spokane, Washington.

== History ==
Despite their long history in the KIJHL, the Braves have never won the league championship. They won their division in 1978/79, 1983/84, and the 1991/92 season. The Spokane Braves primary focus is to move players up to the next level such as the WHL, Junior 'A', and College Hockey.

The club was founded as the Spokane Valley Kings in 1971, finally becoming the Braves in 1985.

The WHL Spokane Chiefs drafted their first player from the Braves in the bantam draft in 2003.

Mike Bay coached the team for 13 years in the 2000s and 2010s, and returned as coach in 2018.

Due to the COVID-19 pandemic and restrictions in travel the Spokane Braves did not participate in the KIJHL. The 2023–24 season marked not only the return to the KIJHL but the 50th anniversary of participation in the KIJHL. The Braves returned to a league that had just been given recognition as being a Junior 'A' level hockey league.

Statistics
Season	GP	W	L	OTL	SOL	Pts	GF	GA	Finish	Playoffs
1971-72	19	0	19	0	—	0	26	247	6th, WKHL	
1972-73	30	20	10	0	—	40	213	121	2nd, East	
1973-74	30	17	13	0	—	34	181	165	3rd, East	
1974-75	34	6	28	0	—	12	142	320	4th, East	
1975-76	34	8	26	0	—	16	146	231	4th, East	
1976-77	44	17	25	2	—	36	210	264	5th, East	
1977-78	42	29	13	0	—	58	288	192	2nd, East	
1978-79	40	27	12	1	—	55	271	173	1st, East	
1979-80	40	28	11	1	—	57	255	161	1st, East	
1980-81	40	12	28	0	—	24	208	257	5th, East	
1981-82	42	20	21	1	—	41	227	257	4th, East	
1982-83	42	26	16	0	—	52	241	201	3rd, East	
1983-84	40	34	6	0	—	68	300	145	1st, West	
1984-85	40	20	20	0	—	40	221	224	3rd, West	
1985-86	39	27	11	2	—	56	253	166	2nd, East	
1986-87	42	31	11	0	—	66	307	206	2nd, East	
1987-88	42	26	16	0	—	52	263	236	3rd, East	
1988-89	42	17	25	0	—	34	170	220	4th, East	
1989-90	40	16	24	0	—	32	208	188	3rd, East	
1990–91*	39	17	22	0	—	34	200	255	2nd, East	
1991-92	38	26	11	1	—	53	275	200	1st, East	Lost in Finals (Leafs)
1992-93	42	31	10	1	—	63	302	203	2nd, West	
1993-94	40	12	28	0	—	24	191	256	6th, West	
1994-95	44	15	26	—	3	33	165	223	4th, West	
1995-96	42	7	31	4	—	18	155	285	5th, West	
1996-97	42	12	30	0	—	22	152	224	5th, Neil Murdoch	
1997-98	50	18	29	3	—	39	189	232	4th, Neil Murdoch	
1998-99	50	13	34	3	—	29	153	229	5th, Neil Murdoch	
1999-00	46	21	22	3	—	45	237	214	5th, Neil Murdoch	Did not qualify
2000-01	58	24	29	4	1	53	237	241	5th, Neil Murdoch	Did not qualify
2001-02	50	16	28	5	1	38	156	209	4th, Neil Murdoch	Lost in Division Semifinals, 0-4 (Nitehawks)
2002-03	50	21	23	4	1	47	187	185	3rd, Neil Murdoch	Lost in Division Semifinals, 2-4 (Leafs)
2003-04	50	28	16	4	2	62	211	184	2nd, Neil Murdoch	Lost in Division Finals, 0-4 (Nitehawks)
2004-05	50	23	21	4	2	52	171	166	3rd, Neil Murdoch	Lost in Division Semifinals, 1-4 (Rebels)
2005-06	50	21	21	5	3	50	177	177	4th, Neil Murdoch	Lost in Division Semifinals, 0-4 (Nitehawks)
2006-07	52	29	19	4	0	62	231	205	4th, Neil Murdoch	Lost in Division Semifinals, 0-4 (Leafs)
2007-08	52	19	27	6	0	44	158	210	4th, Neil Murdoch: East	Did not qualify
2008-09	52	23	26	3	0	49	202	204	4th, Neil Murdoch	Lost in Division Semifinals, 1-4 (Leafs)
2009-10	50	28	20	0	2	58	196	176	3rd, Neil Murdoch	Lost in Division Finals, 3–4 (Leafs)
2010-11	50	21	26	1	2	45	170	171	4th, Neil Murdoch	Lost in Division Semifinals, 1-4 (Rebels)
2011-12	52	21	28	1	2	45	192	254	4th, Neil Murdoch	Lost in Division Semifinals, 1-4 (Nitehawks)
2012-13	52	14	30	4	4	36	163	232	4th, Neil Murdoch	Lost in Division Semifinals, 1-4 (Rebels)
2013-14	52	22	26	0	4	48	160	177	4th, Neil Murdoch	Lost in Division Semifinals, 2-4 (Leafs)
2014-15	52	25	23	0	4	54	161	161	3rd, Neil Murdoch	Lost in Division Semifinals, 1-4 (Rebels)
2015-16	52	10	38	0	4	24	116	241	5th, Neil Murdoch	Did not qualify
2016-17	47	8	38	0	1	17	129	250	5th, Neil Murdoch Division; 19th of 20 - KIJHL	Did not qualify
2017-18	47	15	28	2	2	34	137	201	5th, Neil Murdoch Division; 18th of 20 - KIJHL	Did not qualify
2018-19	49	19	26	0	4	42	130	176	4th, Neil Murdoch Division; 13th of 20 - KIJHL	Lost Division Semifinals, 3-4 (Leafs)
2019-20	49	20	23	2	4	46	137	185	3rd, Neil Murdoch Division; 13th of 20 - KIJHL	Lost Division Semifinals, 0-4 (Leafs)
2023–24	44	11	32	1	0	23	133	247	5 in division 19th overall	Did not qualify
2024–25	44	9	32	1	2	21	104	216	5 in division 21st overall	Did not qualify
2025–26	44	15	25	3	1	34	130	184	4 in division 15th overall	Lost quarterfinal against Beaver Valley (4:0)

Notes

1. Stats for the 1990–91 season are only thru February 17, 1991. May not be complete

=== Playoffs ===
Records as of March 29, 2020.

Season	1st Round	2nd Round	3rd Round	Finals
1999–00	Did not qualify			
2000–01	Did not qualify			
2001–02	L, 0-4, Beaver Valley	—	—	—
2002–03	L, 2-4, Nelson	—	—	—
2003–04	W, 4-3, Nelson	L, 0-4, Beaver Valley	—	—
2004–05	L, 1-4, Castlegar	—	—	—
2005–06	L, 0-4, Beaver Valley	—	—	—
2006–07	L, 0-4, Nelson	—	—	—
2007–08	Did not qualify			
2008–09	L, 1-4, Nelson	—	—	—
2009–10	W, 4-2, Castlegar	L, 3-4, Nelson	—	—
2010-11	L, 1-4, Castlegar	—	—	—
2011-12	L, 1-4, Beaver Valley	—	—	—
2012–13	L, 1-4, Castlegar	—	—	—
2013-14	L, 2-4, Nelson	—	—	—
2014–15	L, 1-4, Castlegar	—	—	—
2015–16	Did not qualify			
2016-17	Did not qualify			
2017–18	Did not qualify			
2018–19	L, 3-4, Nelson	—	—	—
2019–20	L, 0-4, Nelson	—	—	—
2020-21	Playoffs cancelled due to coronavirus pandemic			
2021-22	Did not participate			
2022-23	Did not participate			
2023-24	Did not qualify			
2024-25	Did not qualify			

Notes

1. Prior to the 2001-02 KIJHL playoffs, there was only three playoff rounds (Division Semifinals, Division Finals and Finals), due to two Divisions (Eddie Mountain/West and Neil Murdoch/East) only.

== NHL alumni ==
- Sean Zimmerman
- Derek Ryan
- Scott Levins
- Scott Parker

== KIJHL Awards and trophies ==
Top Defenceman

- Brian Piper: 1987–88
- Bobby Tobiason: 1991–92
- Chase Wharton: 2009–10
- Skyler Smutek: 2007–08
- Kyle Davis: 2013–14
- Taylor Everhart: 2015–16

Rookie of the Year

- Jesse Collins: 2009–10
- Skyler Smutek: 2007–08
- Jason Greenwell: 2004–05
- Jon Manlow: 2013–14
- Mason Jones: 2015–16

Most Valuable Player

- Evan Witt: 2006–07
- Justin Bonanno: 2013–14
- Kurtis Redding: 2015–16

Top Scorer

- Evan Witt: 2005–06
- Kurtis Redding: 2015–16

KIJHL AWARDS

- Chase Wharton: 2009-10 Neil Murdoch Division Top Defenseman
- Jesse Collins: 2009-10 Neil Murdoch Rookie of the Year
- Brycen Fisher: 2012-13 Neil Murdoch Division Top Defenseman
- Jon Manlow: 2013-14 Neil Murdoch Division Goalie of the Year
- Gary Redding: 2013-14 Neil Murdoch Division Coach of the Year
- Trevor DiLauro: 2015-16 Neil Murdoch Division Goalie of the Year
- Luke Gallagher: 2016-17 Neil Murdoch Division Rookie of The Year
- Gary Redding: 2017-18 Neil Murdoch Division Coach of The Year
- Bear Hughes: 2018-19 Neil Murdoch Division Top Scorer
- Bear Hughes: 2018-19 Neil Murdoch Division MVP
- Bear Hughes: 2018-19 Neil Murdoch Division Rookie of the Year
- Bear Hughes: 2018-19 KIJHL Rookie of The Year
- Matt Klenk: 2019-20 Neil Murdoch Most Sportsmanlike Player of the Year
- Zach Baumann: 2023-24 Neil Murdoch Top Scorer & Rookie Of The Year
