= Cranbrook Colts =

- City: Cranbrook, British Columbia, Canada
- League: Kootenay International Junior Hockey League; Rocky Mountain Junior Hockey League
- Operated: 1971-1998
- Colours: Black and White

The Cranbrook Colts were a Junior "B" and a Junior "A" team in Cranbrook, British Columbia. They were formed in 1970 as a Junior "B" team in the Kootenay International Junior Hockey League. They were immediately successful, winning the league title in their first four years. The Colts jumped to the Junior "A" Rocky Mountain Junior Hockey League in 1991, winning three league titles in their seven years in the league.

The Colts folded in 1998 and with that, the whole league (RMJHL) the year after folded, because of the forming of the Kootenay Ice in Cranbrook, British Columbia, a major junior team in the Western Hockey League. The Ice relocated to Winnipeg, Manitoba after the 2018-19 WHL season, going back once again to junior "A" in the BCHL for the 2020-21 BCHL season, as the Cranbrook Bucks.

== Championships ==
- Kootenay International Junior Hockey League: 1972, 1973, 1974, 1975, 1976, 1982, 1983, 1984, 1985, 1986, 1987.
- Cyclone Taylor Cup: 1974, 1975, 1982, 1984, 1985, 1986, 1987.
- Rocky Mountain Junior Hockey League: 1995, 1997, 1998.

== History ==
In 1971, the Cranbrook Colts joined the KIJHL with a partial schedule. After going undefeated in nineteen games, Colts went on to win the league playoff title. For much of the 1970s, the Colts were the elite of the KIJHL and amongst the best British Columbia Junior B hockey had to offer. The Colts went on to win KIJHL playoff titles in 1972, 1973, 1974, 1975, and 1976, topping this off with Cyclone Taylor Cups as Provincial Champions in 1974 and 1975.

In the early 1980s, the Colts came back to their winning ways, taking league titles in 1982, 1983, 1984, 1985, 1986, and 1987. They completed this dynastic run by winning the Cyclone Taylor Cup a total of five times, first in 1982, then consecutively in 1984, 1985, 1986, and 1987.

In 1991, the Colts joined the Peace-Cariboo Junior Hockey League with a group of other KIJHL teams to form the Kootenay Division of what was to now be known as the Rocky Mountain Junior Hockey League. The PCJHL had been a tiny Junior "A" league bridging the British Columbia-Alberta North-Central border since 1980. The Southern expansion into the Kootenays was an effort to increase the talent pool and to venture into an area that British Columbia Junior Hockey League had yet to claim. The Colts would continue to dominate, even as a Junior "A" team, winning league championships in 1995, 1997, and 1998.

In 1998, the Western Hockey League's Edmonton Ice was failing and was sold and moved to Cranbrook. The Colts folded to make way for the Major Junior team.

== Season-by-season standings ==
Season	GP	W	L	T	OTL	GF	GA	P	Results	Playoffs
1971-72	19	19	0	0	-	193	48	38	3rd WKHL	Won League
1972-73	30	25	5	0	-	230	92	50	1st KIJHL-E	Won League
1973-74	30	26	3	1	-	245	116	53	1st KIJHL-E	Won League, won CTC
1974-75	34	32	2	0	-	237	111	64	1st KIJHL-E	Won League, won CTC
1975-76	34	24	10	0	-	207	139	48	1st KIJHL-E	Won League
1976-77	44	20	23	1	-	241	221	41	1st KIJHL-E	
1977-78	42	17	25	0	-	209	229	34	3rd KIJHL-E	
1978-79	40	26	13	1	-	264	205	53	2nd KIJHL-E	
1979-80	40	21	16	3	-	217	178	45	3rd KIJHL-E	
1980-81	40	36	3	1	-	293	141	73	1st KIJHL-E	
1981-82	42	37	5	0	-	381	162	74	1st KIJHL-E	Won League, won CTC
1982-83	42	36	6	0	-	331	154	72	1st KIJHL-E	Won League
1983-84	42	29	12	1	-	318	221	59	2nd KIJHL-E	Won League, won CTC
1984-85	42	34	8	0	-	303	187	68	1st KIJHL-E	Won League, won CTC
1985-86	39	32	7	0	-	310	184	64	1st KIJHL-E	Won League, won CTC
1986-87	42	33	8	1	-	303	171	67	1st KIJHL-E	Won League, won CTC
1987-88	42	33	9	0	-	336	180	66	2nd KIJHL-E	
1988-89	43	25	18	0	-	270	172	50	2nd KIJHL-E	
1989-90	40	20	20	0	-	226	215	40	2nd KIJHL-E	
1990-91	40	15	24	1	-	183	223	31	3rd KIJHL-E	
1991-92	52	29	20	3	-	220	173	61	2nd RMJHL-K	Lost semi-final
1992-93	52	31	20	-	1	262	194	63	3rd RMJHL-K	Lost final
1993-94	52	34	17	-	1	295	239	69	2nd RMJHL-K	Lost semi-final
1994-95	52	37	15	-	0	312	193	74	2nd RMJHL-K	Won League
1995-96	58	37	21	-	0	295	197	74	1st RMJHL-K	Lost quarter-final
1996-97	60	34	24	-	2	309	281	70	1st RMJHL	Won League
1997-98	54	35	14	-	5	311	202	75	2nd RMJHL	Won League

=== Playoffs ===
- 1992 Lost semi-final

Cranbrook Colts defeated Fernie Ghostriders 4-games-to-none
Trail Smoke Eaters defeated Cranbrook Colts 4-games-to-3

- 1993 Lost final

Cranbrook Colts defeated Kimberley Dynamiters 4-games-to-2
Cranbrook Colts defeated Trail Smoke Eaters 4-games-to-2
Williams Lake Mustangs defeated Cranbrook Colts 3-games-to-2

- 1994 Lost semi-final

Cranbrook Colts defeated Creston Valley Thunder 4-games-to-1
Kimberley Dynamiters defeated Cranbrook Colts 4-games-to-1

- 1995 Won League, lost Mowat Cup

Cranbrook Colts defeated Kimberley Dynamiters 4-games-to-none
Cranbrook Colts defeated Creston Valley Thunder 4-games-to-none
Cranbrook Colts defeated Prince George Spruce Kings 4-games-to-2 RMJHL CHAMPIONS
Chilliwack Chiefs (BCHL) defeated Cranbrook Colts 3-games-to-none

- 1996 Lost quarter-final

Kimberley Dynamiters defeated Cranbrook Colts 4-games-to-2

- 1997 Won League, lost Mowat Cup

Kimberley Dynamiters defeated Cranbrook Colts 4-games-to-3
Cranbrook Colts defeated Nelson Leafs 4-games-to-none
Cranbrook Colts defeated Fernie Ghostriders 4-games-to-none RMJHL CHAMPIONS
South Surrey Eagles (BCHL) defeated Cranbrook Colts 3-games-to-none

- 1998 Won League, lost Mowat Cup

Cranbrook Colts defeated Fernie Ghostriders 4-games-to-1
Cranbrook Colts defeated Kimberley Dynamiters 4-games-to-3 RMJHL CHAMPIONS
South Surrey Eagles (BCHL) defeated Cranbrook Colts 3-games-to-none

== Notable alumni ==
- Jon Klemm
- Brad Lukowich
- Bob Murdoch
