= Rocky Mountain Junior Hockey League =

Defunct junior ice hockey league

- Countries: Canada
- Founded: 1966
- Folded: 1999
- No. of teams: 4
- Most successful club: Prince George Spruce Kings

The Rocky Mountain Junior Hockey League was a Junior "A" ice hockey league in British Columbia, Canada.

- 1966–1975 – Peace Junior B Hockey League (PJBHL)
- 1975–1991 – Peace-Cariboo Junior Hockey League (PCJHL)
- 1991–1999 – Rocky Mountain Junior Hockey League (RMJHL)

== History ==
In 1975, the Quesnel Millionaires and Prince George Spruce Kings joined the Peace Junior B Hockey League (PJBHL). The PJBHL already included the Fort St. John Huskies, Dawson Creek Canucks, and Grande Prairie North Stars. Previously, Fort St. John won the Cyclone Taylor Cup as British Columbia Jr. B Champions in 1969 as a member of the Peace Jr. B League. With the expansion, the PJBHL became the Peace-Cariboo Junior Hockey League (PCJHL). The first championship of the new PCJHL was won by Prince George, but Quesnel won the league and the Cyclone Taylor Cup as BC Champions in 1977, 1978, and 1979 and the Grande Prairie North Stars won the Russ Barnes Trophy and Alberta champions in 1976.

In 1980 the PCJHL became a Junior "A" League, one season after the British Columbia Junior Hockey League-Pacific Coast Junior Hockey League merger. The league's most successful team, by far, was the Prince George Spruce Kings. Every season, their playoff champion earned the right to play for the Mowat Cup, the British Columbia Junior "A" Title. The PCJHL/RMJHL was eligible for the Royal Bank Cup, the Junior "A" National Title.

In 1991, the PCJHL doubled in size when it took in a portion of the Jr. B KIJHL and was renamed the Rocky Mountain Junior Hockey League (RMJHL). The newcomers, which were concentrated in the southern region, formed the Kootenay Division, and the teams in the northern region formed the Peace-Cariboo Division.

In 1995, the Trail Smoke Eaters moved to the British Columbia Hockey League. In 1996, the entire Peace-Cariboo Division departed the league: the Prince George Spruce Kings and Quesnel Millionaires moved to the BCHL, the Grande Prairie Chiefs moved to the AJHL, the Williams Lake Mustangs folded, and the Fort St. John Huskies moved to Hockey Alberta's North West Junior Hockey League. The Castlegar Rebels joined in 1996, but returned to the KIJHL in 1998. The Cranbrook Colts folded in 1998.

The remaining four teams (Creston Valley Thunder, Kimberley Dynamiters, Nelson Leafs, and Fernie Ghostriders) played an interlocking schedule with the AWHL of USA Hockey. In 1999, the RMJHL proposed that the remaining four teams join the BCHL as a "Kootenay Division", however the BCHL rejected the proposal. The league folded after the 1998–99 season. The Creston Valley Thunder and Nelson Leafs moved to the KIJHL, and the Kimberley Dynamiters and Fernie Ghostriders joined the AWHL.

=== The Mowat Cup ===
The Mowat Cup was the championship trophy of Junior A hockey in British Columbia. From 1981 to 1999, it was awarded to the winner between the championship team from the RMJHL and the championship team from the BCHL. The winner would then go on to play the AJHL championship team for the Doyle Cup. In the end, the BCHL had a near spotless record against the RMJHL, winning all 19 series with a record 48 wins and 1 loss. In the final year of the competition, the Kimberley Dynamiters recorded the league's only win against a BCHL championship team, namely the Vernon Vipers, before losing the series. The BCHL continued to award the Mowat Cup to itself until 2016.

== Teams ==
RMJHL Teams
Team	Home	Joined	Exited	Status
100 Mile House Blazers	100 Mile House	1975	1980	Folded
Castlegar Rebels	Castlegar	1996	1998	Joined KIJHL
Cranbrook Colts	Cranbrook	1991	1998	Folded
Creston Valley Thunder	Creston	1992	1999	Joined KIJHL
Dawson Creek Kodiaks	Dawson Creek	1975	1990	Folded
Fernie Ghostriders	Fernie	1991	1999	Joined KIJHL
Fort St. John Huskies	Fort St. John	1975	1996	Joined NWJHL
Grande Prairie Chiefs	Grande Prairie	1975	1996	Joined AJHL
Kimberley Dynamiters	Kimberley	1991	1999	Joined AWHL
Nelson Leafs	Nelson	1994	1999	Joined KIJHL
Prince George Spruce Kings	Prince George	1975	1996	Joined BCHL
Quesnel Millionaires	Quesnel	1975	1996	Joined BCHL
Trail Smoke Eaters	Trail	1991	1995	Joined BCHL
Williams Lake Mustangs	Williams Lake	1978	1996	Folded

== Champions ==
From its founding until 1991, the league's champion was awarded the PCJHL Trophy. From 1992 until 1996, the league's champion was awarded the Citizen Cup. From 1997 until 1999, the league's champion was awarded the Subway/Eddie Mountain Trophy.

Year	Champion	Finalist
Junior B
1976	Prince George Spruce Kings	Grande Prairie North Stars
1977	Quesnel Millionaires
1978	Quesnel Millionaires
1979	Quesnel Millionaires
1980	Prince George Spruce Kings
Junior A
1981	Prince George Spruce Kings	Fort St. John Golden Hawks
1982	Prince George Spruce Kings	Grande Prairie North Stars
1983	Williams Lake Mustangs	Dawson Creek Kodiaks
1984	Prince George Spruce Kings	Williams Lake Mustangs
1985	Prince George Spruce Kings	Fort St. John Huskies
1986	Prince George Spruce Kings	Williams Lake Mustangs
1987	Quesnel Millionaires	Grande Prairie North Stars
1988	Grande Prairie North Stars	Prince George Spruce Kings
1989	Williams Lake Mustangs	Grande Prairie North Stars
1990	Prince George Spruce Kings	Fort St. John Huskies
1991	Prince George Spruce Kings	Williams Lake Mustangs
1992	Prince George Spruce Kings	Trail Smoke Eaters
1993	Williams Lake Mustangs	Cranbrook Colts
1994	Kimberley Dynamiters	Fort St. John Huskies
1995	Cranbrook Colts	Prince George Spruce Kings
1996	Prince George Spruce Kings	Fernie Ghostriders
1997	Cranbrook Colts	Fernie Ghostriders
1998	Cranbrook Colts	Kimberley Dynamiters
1999	Kimberley Dynamiters	Fernie Ghostriders

== See also ==
- British Columbia Hockey League
- Alberta Junior Hockey League
- Canadian Junior A Hockey League
- Hockey Canada
- Kootenay International Junior Hockey League
- Memorial Cup
- Mowat Cup
- Royal Bank Cup
