= Castlegar Rebels =

Canadian junior ice hockey team

- City: Castlegar, British Columbia
- League: Western International Junior Hockey League
- Division: Southern
- Founded: 1976
- Home arena: Castlegar and District Community Complex
- Colours: Black, metallic gold, orange and white
- President: Mike Johnstone
- General manager: Jesse Dorrans
- Head coach: Alex Evin
- Captain: Vacant
- Website: castlegarrebels.ca

Franchise history
- 1976–present: Castlegar Rebels

Championships
- Playoff championships: KIJHL Championships: 4 1977, 1978, 1996 and 2013

The Castlegar Rebels are a Junior 'A' ice hockey team based in Castlegar, British Columbia, Canada. They are members of the Southern Division of the Western International Junior Hockey League (WIJHL). They play their home games at the Castlegar and District Community Complex.

The Rebels played Junior 'A' in the Rocky Mountain Junior Hockey League from 1996 until 1998.

== History ==
The Rebels joined the league in 1976 as an expansion team. The Rebels have won the KIJHL Championship four times, in 1977, 1978, 1996 and 2013. They won four division titles as a member of the Western Division from 1976 to 1996, two division titles as a member of the Neil Murdoch Division from 2007 to 2013; two conference titles as a member of the Kootenay Conference from 2007 to 2013.

Castlegar left the KIJHL and joined the break-away WIJHL in the 2025-26 offseason.

== Season-by-season record ==
Note: GP = Games played, W = Wins, L = Losses, T = Ties, D = Defaults, OTL = Overtime Losses, Pts = Points, GF = Goals for, GA = Goals against

Final records as of February 17, 2024.

Season	GP	W	L	T	D	OTL	Pts	GF	GA	Finish	Playoffs
1976–77	44	24	19	1	―	―	49	248	233	3rd, West	KIJHL Champions (Colts)
1977–78	42	28	14	0	―	―	56	233	149	2nd, West	KIJHL Champions (Clippers)
1978–79	40	22	18	0	―	―	44	225	189	2nd, West	
1979–80	40	20	20	0	―	―	40	218	211	2nd, West	
1980–81	40	25	15	0	―	―	50	245	201	2nd, West	
1981–82	42	21	20	1	―	―	43	243	237	3rd, West	
1982–83	42	17	23	2	―	―	36	242	257	3rd, West	
1983–84	40	24	16	0	―	―	48	260	199	3rd, West	
1984–85	40	27	13	0	―	―	54	293	220	1st, West	
1985–86	42	30	12	0	―	―	60	313	240	2nd, West	
1986–87	42	32	10	0	―	―	64	328	211	1st, West	Lost in Finals (Colts)
1987–88	42	27	15	0	―	―	54	274	201	1st, West	
1988–89	45	14	31	0	―	―	28	235	305	5th, West	
1989–90	40	14	25	1	―	―	29	180	229	5th, West	
1990–91	41	9	29	3	―	―	21	147	247	5th, West	
1991–92	38	12	26	0	―	―	24	162	217	4th, West	
1992–93	42	25	16	1	―	―	51	249	200	4th, West	
1993–94	40	35	5	0	―	―	70	351	153	1st, West	
1994–95	44	27	13	―	―	4	58	239	185	1st, West	
1995–96	42	32	10	0	―	―	64	232	153	1st, West	KIJHL Champions (Eagles)
1996–97	60	30	25	―	―	5	65	277	265	4th, RMJHL	Lost in Quarterfinals, 2–4 (Ghostriders)
1997–98	54	22	30	―	―	2	46	258	321	4th, RMJHL	Lost in Quarterfinals, 0–2 (Leafs)
1998–99	50	20	28	2	―	―	42	168	183	4th, Neil Murdoch	Playoff statistics not available
1999–00	46	22	23	1	―	―	45	209	174	4th, Neil Murdoch	Lost in Division Semifinals, 2–4 (Leafs)
2000–01	58	40	16	2	―	0	82	286	190	2nd, Neil Murdoch	Lost in Division Semifinals, 2–4 (Heat)
2001–02	50	35	9	5	―	1	76	260	162	2nd, Neil Murdoch	Lost in Division Finals, 1–4 (Nitehawks)
2002–03	50	19	23	5	―	3	46	177	198	4th, Neil Murdoch	Lost in Division Semifinals, 1–4 (Nitehawks)
2003–04	50	15	27	5	―	3	38	149	190	4th, Neil Murdoch	Lost in Division Semifinals, 0–4 (Nitehawks)
2004–05	50	33	10	5	―	2	73	204	140	2nd, Neil Murdoch	Lost in Division Finals, 1–4 (Nitehawks)
2005–06	50	27	19	2	―	2	58	184	179	2nd, Neil Murdoch	Lost in Division Semifinals, 1–4 (Leafs)
2006–07	52	30	16	―	―	5	65	211	167	3rd, Neil Murdoch	Lost in Division Semifinals, 3–4 (Nitehawks)
2007–08	52	34	15	―	―	3	71	222	155	3rd, Neil Murdoch	Lost in Division Semifinals, 0–3 (Nitehawks)
2008–09	52	27	20	―	―	5	59	185	186	2nd, Neil Murdoch	Lost in Division Finals, 0–4 (Leafs)
2009–10	50	30	16	2	―	2	64	206	141	2nd, Neil Murdoch	Lost in Division Semifinals, 2–4 (Braves)
2010–11	50	42	8	0	―	0	84	242	120	1st, Neil Murdoch	Lost Finals, 2–4 (Coyotes)
2011–12	52	37	11	1	―	3	78	255	133	2nd, Neil Murdoch	Lost in Division Finals, 3–4 (Nitehawks)
2012–13	52	35	9	6	―	2	78	219	123	1st, Neil Murdoch	KIJHL Champions, 4–1 (Knights)
2013–14	52	22	25	2	―	3	49	182	218	3rd, Neil Murdoch	Lost in Division Semifinals, 0–4 (Nitehawks)
2014–15	52	30	17	1	0	4	65	202	182	2nd, Neil Murdoch	Lost in Division Finals, 0–4 (Nitehawks)
2015–16	52	32	15	3	0	2	69	195	146	2nd, Neil Murdoch	Lost in Division Semifinals, 2–4 (Border Bruins)
2016–17	47	30	16	0	0	1	61	221	174	2nd, Neil Murdoch	Lost in Division Semifinals, 2–4 (Leafs)
2017–18	47	30	13	1	1	2	63	199	121	2nd, Neil Murdoch	Lost in Division Semifinals, 1–4 (Leafs)
2018–19	49	13	31	1	-	5	31	150	189	2nd of 5, Neil Murdoch; 19th of 20 KIJHL	Did not qualify for playoffs
2019–20	49	14	29	0	-	6	34	144	204	4th of 5, Neil Murdoch; 16 of 20 KIJHL	Lost Div Semifinals, 0-4, (Nitehawks)
2020–21	3	2	1	0	0	-	4	14	16	Remaining season cancelled due to COVID-19	
2021–22	42	16	24	1	1	-	34	115	151	4th of 5, Neil Murdoch; 13 of 19 KIJHL	Lost Div Semifinals, 2-4, (Leafs)
2022–23	44	11	28	-	-	5	27	103	169	4th of 4, Neil Murdoch; 17 of 19 KIJHL	Did not qualify for playoffs
2023–24	44	20	19	-	3	2	45	135	142	4th of 5, Neil Murdoch; 12 of 20 KIJHL	Lost Div Semifinals, 0-4, (Nitehawks)
2024–25	44	15	21	4	4	0	38	126	171	4th of 5, Neil Murdoch; 6th of 10 Kootenay Conf; 15 of 21 KIJHL	Lost Div Semifinals, 0-4, (Border Bruins)
2025–26	44	20	20	-	4	0	44	135	151	3rd of 5, Neil Murdoch; 6th of 10 Kootenay Conf; 13 of 21 KIJHL	Lost Div Semifinals, 0-4, (Border Bruins)
Moving to Independent Western International Junior Hockey League

=== Playoffs ===
Records as of February 27, 2024.

Season	1st Round	2nd Round	3rd Round	Finals
1996–97	L, 2–4, Fernie	—	—	—
1997–98	L, 0–2, Nelson	—	—	—
1998–99	Playoff statistics not available			
1999–00	L, 2–4, Nelson	—	—	—
2000–01	L, 2–4, Osoyoos	—	—	—
2001–02	W, 4–1, Nelson	L, 1–4, Beaver Valley	—	—
2002–03	L, 1–4, Beaver Valley	—	—	—
2003–04	L, 0–4, Beaver Valley	—	—	—
2004–05	W, 4–1, Spokane	L, 1–4, Beaver Valley	—	—
2005–06	L, 1–4, Nelson	—	—	—
2006–07	L, 3–4, Beaver Valley	—	—	—
2007–08	L, 0–3, Beaver Valley	—	—	—
2008–09	W, 4–2, Beaver Valley	L, 0–4, Nelson	—	—
2009–10	L, 2–4, Spokane	—	—	—
2010–11	W, 4–1, Spokane	W, 4–1, Beaver Valley	W, 4–2, Fernie	L, 2–4, Osoyoos
2011–12	W, 4–1, Nelson	L, 3–4, Beaver Valley	—	—
2012–13	W, 4–1, Spokane	W, 4–3, Beaver Valley	W, 4–0, Golden	W, 4–1, North Okanagan
2013–14	L, 0–4, Beaver Valley	—	—	—
2014–15	W, 4–1, Spokane	L, 0–4, Beaver Valley	—	—
2015–16	L, 2–4, Grand Forks	—	—	—
2016–17	L, 2–4, Nelson	—	—	—
2017–18	W, 4–3, Beaver Valley	L, 1–4, Nelson	—	—
2018–19	Did not qualify			
2019–20	L, 0-4, Beaver Valley	—	—	—
2020–21	Playoffs cancelled due to coronavirus pandemic			
2021-22	L, 3-4, Nelson	—	—	—
2022–23	Did not qualify			
2023-24	L, 0-4, Beaver Valley	—	—	—
2024-25	L, 0-4, Grand Forks	—	—	—

== NHL alumni ==
Rebels old logo, depicting Looney Tunes character Yosemite Sam.

- Steve Bozek
- Travis Green
- Dane Jackson
- Steve Junker
- Darcy Martini
- Brian Skrudland
- Gordie Walker

== Awards and trophies ==
KIJHL Championship

- 1976–77
- 1977–78
- 1995–96
- 2012–13

Coach of the Year

- Pat Price : 1995-1996 (Divisional)
- Brent Heaven: 2009–10 (Divisional)
- Steve Junker: 2010–11 (Divisional)
- Jesse Dorrans 2014-15 (Divisional)

Most Sportsmanlike

- Cody Steele: 2007–08 (Divisional)
- Ed Lindsey: 2016–17 (Divisional)

Most Valuable Player

- Graham Fleming: 2004–05 (Divisional)
- Eric Rockney: 2007–08 (Divisional)
- Andrew Walton: 2009–10 (Divisional)
- Ryan Aynsley: 2010–11 (Divisional)
- John Moeller: 2016–17 (Divisional)

Rookie of the Year

- Evan Bloodoff: 2005–06 (Divisional)

Top Defenceman

- Darren Tarasoff: 2010–11 (Divisional)

Top Goaltender

- Brady Robinson: 2001–02 (Divisional)
- Andrew Walton: 2007–08 (Divisional)
- Alex Ross: 2010–11 (Divisional)

Top Scorer

- Dion Resicini: 1995-1996 (Divisional)
- Carson Hamill: 2004–05 (Divisional)
- Eric Rockney: 2007–08 (Divisional)
- Ryan Aynsley: 2010–11 (Divisional)
- Logan Styler: 2016–17 (KIJHL)
