= Junior ice hockey =

Under-20 amateur ice hockey

Junior ice hockey is an amateur ice hockey level for 16 to 21-year-old players. National junior teams compete annually for the IIHF World Junior Championship. The Sweden men's national junior ice hockey team are the defending champions from the 2026 World Junior Ice Hockey Championships.

== Hockey Canada ==
There are four levels of Junior hockey in the Canadian Club System: Major Junior, Junior A, Junior B, and Junior C. Not all teams playing in Canadian Junior leagues are based in Canada. As of 2025, there were twelve US-based teams playing in various Major Junior and Junior A leagues in Canada.

In 2023, BC Hockey announced plans to restructure its Junior framework following the departure of its only Junior A league. Its three Junior B leagues (PJHL, KIJHL and VIJHL) were re-styled as "Junior A Tier 2", with plans to promote some to "Junior A Tier 1" following an independent evaluation. It was expected that those teams promoted to "Junior A Tier 1" would eventually apply for membership in the Canadian Junior Hockey League (CJHL), an association of Junior A leagues governed by Hockey Canada and its regional branches. BC Hockey expected the evaluations to be completed during the 2024–25 season. Before the process was completed, the VIJHL announced that it would also withdraw from the Hockey Canada framework and become an independent farm league for the British Columbia Hockey League (BCHL) beginning in the 2024–25 season.

=== Major Junior ===
Major Junior is the highest level of Junior ice hockey in Canada. There are three Major Junior leagues that collectively make up the Canadian Hockey League (CHL):

- Quebec Maritimes Junior Hockey League (QMJHL) – operating in Quebec and Atlantic Canada with 18 teams
- Ontario Hockey League (OHL) – operating in Ontario, Pennsylvania, and Michigan with 20 teams
- Western Hockey League (WHL) – operating in Western Canada, and the U.S. states of Washington and Oregon with 23 teams

The championship teams from each league, as well as a pre-selected host team, compete for the Memorial Cup in a round-robin tournament to determine a national champion.

Major Junior players were historically deemed ineligible to play college hockey in the United States, because they were considered to be professionals by the National Collegiate Athletic Association (NCAA). Major Junior players retain their eligibility for Canadian universities however, and all three leagues have scholarship programs for players. The NCAA changed its position and decided that CHL players were no longer ineligible as of the 2025–26 season. The decision was made after a class action was filed on behalf of a player who was declared ineligible after having played two exhibition games in the OHL when he was 16 years old.

The CHL places a cap of three 20-year-old players per team, and allows up to four 16-year-olds on each roster. While 15-year-old players were formerly permitted to play a limited number of games per season at the CHL level, they are now permitted to play only if they are deemed exceptional by Hockey Canada. As of 2024, nine players have qualified under this rule: centre John Tavares in 2005, defenceman Aaron Ekblad in 2011, centre Connor McDavid in 2012, defenceman Sean Day in 2013, centre Joe Veleno in 2015, centre Shane Wright in 2019, forward Connor Bedard in 2020, forward Michael Misa in 2022, and defenceman Landon DuPont in 2024. CHL teams are currently permitted two "imports" (players from outside Canada and the US) each.

Up until 1970, the leagues that are classified as Major Junior and "Junior A" today were both part of Junior A. In 1970 they were divided into "Tier I Junior A" or "Major Junior A" and "Tier II Junior A". In 1980, the three Major Junior A leagues opted for self-control over being controlled by the branches of the Canadian Amateur Hockey Association (CAHA) and became Major Junior hockey, Tier II Junior A became the top tier of hockey in the CAHA and became Junior A hockey.

=== Junior A ===
Junior A (Junior AAA in Québec; Tier 1 in British Columbia) hockey is one level below Major Junior. It is governed by the respective regional branches of Hockey Canada. The Canadian Junior Hockey League (CJHL) is an association of nine Junior A leagues:

- Alberta Junior Hockey League (AJHL);
- Central Canada Hockey League (CCHL);
- Manitoba Junior Hockey League (MJHL);
- Maritime Junior A Hockey League (MHL);
- Northern Ontario Junior Hockey League (NOJHL);
- Ontario Junior Hockey League (OJHL);
- Quebec Junior Hockey League (LHJQ);
- Saskatchewan Junior Hockey League (SJHL); and
- Superior International Junior Hockey League (SIJHL).

The national championship is the Centennial Cup. Unlike Major Junior players, Junior A players retain their NCAA eligibility and may go on to play college hockey in the US.

In 2023, the British Columbia Hockey League (BCHL) withdrew from the Hockey Canada framework, and thus became an independent league. In response, BC Hockey announced plans to restructure its Junior framework, which included an opportunity for some Junior B teams (styled "Junior A Tier 2" by BC Hockey) to be promoted to Junior A (styled "Junior A Tier 1" by BC Hockey) and eventually seek membership with the CJHL. The league expected the evaluations to be completed during the 2024–25 season. In April 2026, the British Columbia Hockey Conference (BCHC), a new Junior A league, was created with 14 teams from the former Kootenay International Junior Hockey League (KIJHL) and 8 teams from the Pacific Junior Hockey League (PJHL). (Eight remaining teams from the KIJHL have chosen to form the new Western International Junior Hockey League, and the PJHL is continuing with its eight remaining teams.) The BCHC is currently navigating the application process to become a member of the Canadian Junior Hockey League.

=== Junior B ===
Junior B (Junior AA in Québec; Tier 2 in British Columbia) was created in 1933, to differentiate between teams eligible for Memorial Cup competition and those who were not. The major championships across Canada are the Sutherland Cup in Southern Ontario, the Barkley Cup in the Ottawa District, the Coupe Chevrolet in Quebec, the Don Johnson Cup in the Atlantic Provinces, and the Keystone Cup that represents all of Western Canada, from British Columbia to Northwestern Ontario.

=== Junior C ===
Junior C (Junior A in Québec) generally consists of local competitions, but is considered competitive in some regions, and serve as seeding or farm-teams for Junior B teams. Ontario Junior C Hockey has six rounds of best-of-seven playoffs (up to 42 games per team) for the Clarence Schmalz Cup which was first awarded in 1938. The Ontario Junior C playoffs are played for between six of the Province's seven different regional leagues. In Quebec and West of Manitoba, Junior C hockey tends to be an extension of the local minor hockey system and is sometimes called Juvenile or House League. In Ontario, Manitoba, and the Maritimes, Junior C is run independently of minor hockey systems, though with the same mostly recreational purpose.

== USA Hockey ==
Junior ice hockey in the United States is sanctioned by USA Hockey. The top level is Tier I, represented by the United States Hockey League. Tier II is represented by the North American Hockey League. There are several Tier III and independently sanctioned leagues throughout the country. Some US-based teams play in Canadian leagues outside of the USA Hockey framework.

=== Tier I ===
The United States Hockey League (USHL) is currently the only Tier I league in the country, consisting of teams in the central and midwestern United States. The USHL provides an alternative to the Canadian Hockey League, which pays its major junior hockey players a stipend, for players who wish to maintain NCAA eligibility for later in their career.

While playing in the USHL, all player expenses are paid for by the team; no membership or equipment fees are charged. Unlike major junior teams, free-college stipend does not exist. Historically, professional leagues have drafted less directly from USHL teams, although this trend has shifted in recent years, coinciding with the USA Hockey National Team Development Program (NTDP) moving to the USHL in 2009-10.

In the 2019 NHL entry draft, 17 of the 44 players drafted out of the USHL played for the NTDP. Those 44 draft picks were 16 more than any of the three leagues in the Canadian Hockey League, and included nine first round picks (eight of whom came from the NTDP) and seven second round picks. In the 2026 NHL entry draft, 14 of the 44 players drafted out of the USHL had played for the NTDP. 17 of the 25 players on the United States men's team for the 2026 Olympic Games in Milano-Cortina were alumni of the NTDP, which had increased from nine NTDP alumni on the roster for the 2014 Olympics in Sochi, and seven NTDP alumni in the 2010 Olympics in Vancouver.

For most of its existence the USHL was considered inferior in quality of play to the Canadian major junior levels. But it has continued to improve, and as of 2019 about 21 percent of NHL players had played USHL in their career Between 80 and 90 percent of USHL players continued into NCAA hockey., including a few Canadian hockey players who grew up in the United States, such as Macklin Celebrini, who played for the USHL Chicago Steel.

=== Tier II ===
Currently, the North American Hockey League is the only USA Hockey-sanctioned Tier II league in the United States. The NAHL consists of teams spread across the western two thirds of the United States with a significant concentration of teams in the central and southwestern parts of the United States, although the league began to expand to east coast as of 2015. In October 2016, the Tier III United States Premier Hockey League, a league predominately located on the east coast, applied to USA Hockey for approval of a Tier II league to begin in the 2017–18 season, however, the league was denied that December and decided to operate its Tier II league independently.

The NAHL, like the USHL, provides young players an alternative to major junior hockey, although the skill level is considered significantly lower than major junior hockey and typically filled with those who would not or did not make the roster of a Tier I team. Unlike Tier I, the NAHL does not pay for all players' expenses, such as room and board, but there is no tuition cost to the player as in Tier III.

=== Tier III ===
In addition to paying for room and board, players at the Tier III level pay a fee or tuition, commonly ranging from $4,000 to $9,500. This is for all accounts and purposes an amateur level, although some players go directly to NCAA Division I schools. Most Tier III players are looking to increase their skills in hopes to move up to Tier II or I, while other players go directly to NCAA Division III, ACHA and CHF schools.

Prior to July 2011, USA Hockey split Tier III into Junior A and B divisions. USA Hockey currently has one sanctioned Tier III league, the North American 3 Hockey League

== Independent leagues ==
Some Junior ice hockey leagues operate outside the framework of governing bodies such as Hockey Canada and USA Hockey, typically due to disagreements with governing bodies over player recruitment policies and finances. These leagues are sometimes referred to as 'unsanctioned', 'rogue' or 'outlaw' leagues due to their lack of sanctioning or oversight from an outside governing body.

Since 2006, the Greater Metro Junior A Hockey League has operated as an independent league in Ontario, Quebec, and Alberta. The league widely recruits players from outside of North America.

In late 2016, the United States Premier Hockey League, an organization composed of several USA Hockey Tier III Junior as well as many youth hockey leagues, applied for a Tier II league. The Tier II status was denied in December 2016 but the USPHL moved forward with the new league anyway, creating the National Collegiate Development Conference. In response, the USPHL has removed all their junior level leagues (the NCDC and the Tier III-level Premier and Elite Divisions) from USA Hockey sanctioning since the 2017–18 season.

In 2022, the Eastern Hockey League, which was operating two Tier III leagues, also left USA Hockey sanctioning.

In 2023, the Junior A British Columbia Hockey League (BCHL) withdrew its membership with Hockey Canada and became an independent league. In 2024, the Vancouver Island Junior Hockey League (VIJHL) announced that it would also withdraw from the Hockey Canada framework and become an independent farm league for the BCHL beginning in the 2024–25 season.

== Europe ==
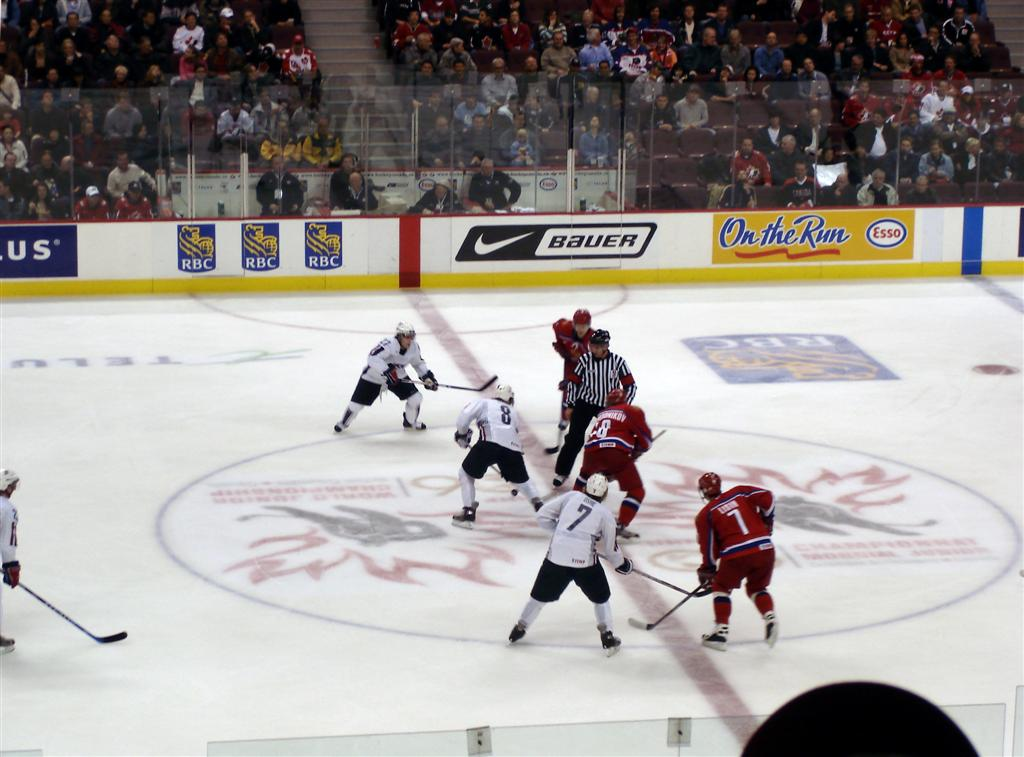
Russia vs. United States at the 2006 World Junior Ice Hockey Championships

In Europe, Junior teams are usually associated with a professional team, and are used by professional teams to develop their own prospects. One example of this is the J20 SuperElit league in Sweden or the Minor Hockey League in Russia.

The lack of an amateur draft in Europe means that the onus is on the teams to sign the most talented young players they can get, and the presence of an affiliated junior team provides a place for young players who are not yet ready for the rigours of the professional game to develop. However, not all players on a European junior team are necessarily property of their professional club, and may elect to sign elsewhere.

At the World Hockey Summit in 2010, nations in Europe expressed concern about the number of junior players leaving to play in North America, despite the improved talent level and the increasing popularity of the IIHF Ice Hockey World Junior Championships. Slavomir Lener, a director with the Czech Ice Hockey Association, felt that Junior-aged players were enticed to play in North America before maturation, with a negative effect on the development of the player and the European system. He stated that of the 527 Czech Republic players who went to North American Junior hockey, only 22 of them played more than 400 NHL games. He sought to establish a European system that was competitive enough to deter players from entering into the CHL Import Draft.

== See also ==
- 2007 Super Series (Canada versus Russia challenge)
- Canadian Hockey League
- Canadian Junior Hockey League
- Hockey Canada
- International Ice Hockey Federation
- Junior Hockey League (Russia)
- List of ice hockey leagues
- USA Hockey
- World Junior A Challenge
- World Junior Club Cup
- World Junior Ice Hockey Championships
