= 2024–25 KIJHL season =

American and Canadian ice hockey season

- League: KIJHL
- Sport: Ice hockey
- Duration: September – February
- Games: 44
- Teams: 21
- Streaming partner: flohockey.tv
- KIJHL president's trophy: Grand Forks Border Bruins
- Teck Cup: Grand Forks Border Bruins (1st Title)
- Runners-up: Revelstoke Grizzlies
- Season MVP: Levi Astill (GFB)
- Cup MVP: Tyler Burke (GFB)
- Top scorer: Levi Astill (GFB)

Seasons
- ← 2023–24 2025–26 →

The 2024–25 KIJHL season was the 58th season of the Kootenay International Junior Hockey League. The regular season began on September 20, 2024, with 18 of 21 franchises in action on opening night, the Kelowna Chiefs and defending champions the Revelstoke Grizzlies started the season the next night while the Ghostriders started their season the following Friday night. The only rematch of the 2024 Teck Cup Finals occurred on December 7, 2024, in Revelstoke, with the Grizzlies winning 4–3 in a shootout. The season was played until February 22, 2025. The playoffs began a week later on February 28, 2025, with 16 teams competing for the Teck Cup.

== League changes ==
The first major off-season change occurred on March 22, 2024, when the KIJHL's board of governors approved the sale of the Summerland Steam to a new ownership group including Tyrel and Robin Lucas, Parnell Pinette, Brad Paddison, Gerald Overton, and Aaron and Nathan Zurak. The new ownership moved the team to Williams Lake where they became the Williams Lake Mustangs, a moniker previously used by the RMJHL team that played from 1978 to 1996.

On March 31, 2024, the league announced that the Merritt Centennials, formerly of the BCHL, would join the KIJHL as an expansion franchise in the 2024–25 KIJHL season. The franchise will retain the Centennials moniker, colours, arena and branding.

The second relocation of the 2024 off-season occurred five days later when the North Okanagan Knights were sold to a Quesnel-based ownership group who moved the team north, expanding the league footprint by 100 kilometres into the Cariboo region where they would be rebranded as the Quesnel River Rush.

The Kelowna Chiefs were sold to Kelowna businessman Darren Tymchyshyn.

On May 5, Rebels' forward Nathan Jackman was killed in a car accident. Nate's number 23, was retired on September 20 at the Rebels home-opener. Jasper Tait, who started the season with William's Lake before being traded to Grand Forks, and Caden Still of the Nelson Leafs, have changed their numbers to 23 to honor Nate.

On December 2 the Nelson Leafs fired head coach/general manager Briar McNaney after the team's 12-11-0-0 start to the season that saw six different goaltenders play. Assistant Coach Gianni Mangone would be promoted to the role of head coach for the remainder of the season.

== Regular season ==
League map
Legend
- Kootenay Conference
- Eddie Mountain Division
- 1 Golden Rockets
- 2 Columbia Valley Rockies
- 3 Fernie Ghostriders
- 4 Kimberley Dynamiters
- 5 Creston Thundercats
- Neil Murdoch Division
- 6 Nelson Leafs
- 7 Castlegar Rebels
- 8 Beaver Valley Nitehawks
- 9 Spokane Braves
- 10 Grand Forks Border Bruins
- Okanagan/Shuswap Conference
- Bill Ohlhausen Division
- 11 Osoyoos Coyotes
- 12 Princeton Posse
- 13 Merritt Centennials
- 14 Kelowna Chiefs
- 15 Sicamous Eagles
- 16 Revelstoke Grizzlies
- Doug Birks Division
- 17 Chase Heat
- 18 Kamloops Storm
- 19 100 Mile House Wranglers
- 20 Williams Lake Mustangs
- 21 Quesnel River Rush

On July 3, 2024 the KIJHL announced the regular season schedule as well as the new division format in the Okanagan Conference, the Revelstoke Grizzlies and Sicamous Eagles would move from the Doug Birks Division to the Bill Ohlhausen joining the Centennials, Chiefs, Coyotes, and Posse. While the River Rush and Mustangs would take their spots in the Doug Birks along with the Storm, Heat, and Wranglers. The KIJHL season was 44 games long for each team. The KIJHL erroneously reported that each team would play 10 out-of-conference games but in reality the 10 clubs in the Kootenay would in fact play 11. Each team's schedule can be broken down as follows:

- Neil Murdoch Division
  - 1 game against each Doug Birks team (5 total: 5 away)
  - 1 game against each Bill Ohlhausen team (6 total: 6 home)
  - 2 games against all-but-one Eddie Mountain team (9 total: 4 home, 5 away)
  - 6 games against the other Neil Murdoch teams (24 total: 12 home, 12 away)
- Eddie Mountain Division
  - 1 game against each Doug Birks team (5 total: 5 home)
  - 1 game against each Bill Ohlhausen team (6 total: 6 away)
  - 2 games against all-but-one Neil Murdoch team (9 total: 5 home, 4 away)
  - 6 games against the other Eddie Mountain teams (24 total: 12 home, 12 away)
- Doug Birks Division
  - 1 game against each Neil Murdoch team (5 total: 5 home)
  - 1 game against each Eddie Mountain team (5 total: 5 away)
  - 2 games against each Bill Ohlhausen team (12 total: 6 home, 6 away)
  - 5 or 6 games against the other Doug Birks division teams (22 total: 11 home, 11 away)
- Bill Ohlhausen Division
  - 1 game against each Neil Murdoch team (5 total: 5 away)
  - 1 game against each Eddie Mountain team (5 total: 5 home)
  - 2 games against each Doug Birks team (10 total: 5 home, 5 away)
  - 4-5 games against the other Bill Ohlhausen teams (24 total:12 home, 12 away)

The season began on September 20

=== Standings ===
Team	W	L	OTL	SOL	Pts	GF	GA	GD
Kootenay Conference-Eddie Mountain Division
xy-Kimberley Dynamiters	32	9	3	0	67	191	142	49
x-Fernie Ghostriders	28	10	4	2	62	172	130	42
x-Columbia Valley Rockies	26	16	2	0	54	187	158	29
x-Creston Valley Thundercats	16	24	4	0	36	110	157	-47
e-Golden Rockets	11	22	7	4	33	119	170	-51
Kootenay Conference-Neil Murdoch Division
xyzp-Grand Forks Border Bruins	33	6	4	1	71	224	117	107
x-Beaver Valley Nitehawks	30	11	3	0	63	176	115	61
x-Nelson Leafs	19	23	1	1	40	142	190	-48
x-Castlegar Rebels	15	21	4	4	38	126	171	-45
e-Spokane Braves	9	32	1	2	21	104	216	-112
Okanagan/Shuswap Conference-Bill Ohlhausen Division
xyz-Princeton Posse	33	7	3	1	70	192	99	93
x-Revelstoke Grizzlies	32	7	1	4	69	173	109	64
x-Merritt Centennials	26	13	3	2	57	146	122	24
x-Sicamous Eagles	22	16	6	0	50	163	146	17
e-Kelowna Chiefs	19	21	1	3	42	161	188	-27
e-Osoyoos Coyotes	15	26	2	1	33	117	182	-65
Okanagan/Shuswap Conference-Doug Birks Division
xy-100 Mile House Wranglers	25	15	1	3	54	166	149	17
x-Kamloops Storm	25	18	1	0	51	155	141	14
x-Quesnel River Rush	19	19	3	3	41	167	186	-19
x-Williams Lake Mustangs	15	22	3	4	37	156	193	-37
e-Chase Heat	12	29	2	1	27	112	178	-66

x-Clinched Playoffs xy-Clinched Division xyz-Clinched Conference xyzp-Clinched best regular season record e-Eliminated from playoff contention

== BCHC Prospects game ==
The BCHC prospects game was the third edition of the game, a matchup between the best young players in the KIJHL and PJHL who formed the BCHC on September 22, 2022. The game is used to showcase the best talent in the league to higher leagues, including the WHL. The Langley Trappers of the PJHL hosted the 2024 game on November 19 at the George Preston Rec. Centre. The team staff was announced on October 30, team KIJHL's head coach was once again Dave Hnatiuk of the Grand Forks Border Bruins, who was the head coach of the team at the two previous games. The assistant coaches were Nick Deschenes of the Kelowna Chiefs, Chad Scharff of the Fernie Ghostriders and Geordie Wudrick of the Creston Valley Thunder Cats. Stephen Piccolo of the Beaver Valley Nitehawks was the team's operations manager and Brian Burdikin, of the Border Bruins, was the athletic trainer and equipment manager. Team PJHL was coached by Cullen Revel (Richmond Sockeyes), Andy Liboiron (Surrey Knights), Jarrett Craig (Abbotsford Pilots) and Caymen Froude (Coastal Tsunami), the team's co-Operations Managers were Derek Bedard (Ridge Meadows Flames) and Will Kump (Richmond Sockeyes). Jordana Robinson (Langley Trappers), Steve Sun (Port Moody Panthers) and Kristalee Walchuk (Abbotsford Pilots) formed the PJHL's Athletic Training & Equipment Management staff. Rosters were announced November 6. Many fans of both the KIJHL and PJHL voiced their displeasure with the concept of the game as many felt that either an inter-league all star game or a Kootenay Conference VS Okanagan Conference all star game would be more enjoyable to watch, especially after the PJHL announced an all-star game of their own, proving that it was possible to have both and all-star game alongside the prospects game.

=== Rosters ===
Team KIJHL		Team PJHL	
Player	Team	Player	Team
Goaltenders
Brenner Fyfe	Kamloops	Josh Vallee	Ridge Meadows
Michael Makowsky	Sicamous	Armaan Kaila	Richmond
Defencemen
Aaron Zulinick	Kamloops	Tyler Blatz	Ridge Meadows
Brett Woodard	100 Mile House	Miller Bruckshaw	Delta
Keiran Thibault	Kamloops	Noah Marshall	Chilliwack
Ben Filippone	Castlegar	Lachlan Staniforth	Chilliwack
Rhett Serfas	Merritt	Ryan Howe	Langley
Levi Dewitt	Sicamous	Nathan Gray	Richmond
Forwards
Asher Lucas	Williams Lake	Lucas Davidson	North Vancouver
Luca D'Amore	Kamloops	Cody Johnston	Abbotsford
Phoenix Flett	Grand Forks	Beaudy Beaudin	Richmond
Berkley Gross	Creston Valley	Jesse Brideau	Chiliwack
Dylan Ruff	Merritt	Lukas Jakubec	Delta
Jaden Rusznack	100 Mile House	Jonah Ussher	White Rock
Ryker Rougeau	Grand Forks	Max Shin	Richmond
Clayton Gillmore	Sicamous	Oliver Nottingham	Coastal
Noah Paulsen	Kamloops	Dalton Toma	Ridge Meadows
Kaelen Swanson	Williams Lake	Deegan Holding	Chilliwack
Brayden Rotach	Castlegar	Avraham Brown	Langley
Luke Davies	Kimberley	Nick Kovich	Richmond

19 November 2024; 18:00	KIJHL Prospects	1-4 (0–2,1-0,0-2)	PJHL Prospects	George Preston Rec. Centre, Langley

Game reference

Brenner Fyfe (Starter)(L), Michael Makowsky
Goalies
Josh Vallee (Starter)(W), Armaan Kaila
Referees:
(Canada) Jagjit Cheema
(Canada) Malcom Simpson
Linesmen:
(Canada) Connor Bradley
(Canada) Isaac La Roy

	0–1	6:37 – O.Nottingham (PP) (B. Beaudin, L. Davidson)
	0–2	10:51 –N. Kovich (M. Shin)
35:43 – A. Zulinick (PP)	1-2
	1-3	46:47 – T. Blatz (PP)(C. Johnston, J. Brideau)
	1-4	53:36 – A. Brown

18 min
Penalties
12 min
23
Shots
46

Aaron Zulinick was named the KIJHL's player of the game. Whilst Cody Johnston received the honor for team PJHL.

== Awards ==
On November 12, 2025 the KIJHL announced the 'Wayne March General Manager of the Year award' to join the existing annual awards. The award was named after Sicamous Eagles co-founder and general manager who died on September 18, 2025. The first recipient of the award was Brad Anstey, General Manager of the Merritt Centennials.

Award	Eddie Mountain Winner	Neil Murdoch Winner	Bill Ohlhausen Winner	Doug Birks Winner	KIJHL Overall Winner
Most Valuable Player	Taylor Haggerty (Fernie)	Levi Astill (Grand Forks)	Tyson Horiachka (Princeton)	Ethan Davey (100 Mile House)	Levi Astill (Grand Forks)
Top Scorer	Taylor Haggerty (Fernie)	Levi Astill (Grand Forks)	Matthew Langdon (Princeton)	Ethan Davey (100 Mile House)	Levi Astill (Grand Forks)
Top Defenceman	Eric Martin (Fernie)	Russell Kosec (Grand Forks)	Grady Sterling-Ponech (Princeton)	Declan Pocock (Williams Lake)	Eric Martin (Fernie)
Top Goaltender	Brendan Smith (Creston Valley)	Connor Stojan (Beaver Valley)	Kael Svenson (Sicamous)	Brenner Fyfe (Kamloops)	Kael Svenson (Sicamous)
Rookie of the Year	Luke Davies (Kimberley)	Brandon Gray (Grand Forks)	Sam Giangualano (Merritt)	Asher Lucas (Williams Lake)	Asher Lucas (Williams Lake)
Most Sportsmanlike Player	Peter Godley (Columbia Valley)	Hunter Hansen (Beaver Valley)	Scott Dyck (Osoyoos)	Cash Anderson (Quesnel)	Cash Anderson (Quesnel)
Coach of the Year	Derek Stuart (Kimberley)	Dave Hnatiuk (Grand Forks)	Wes McLeod (Merritt)	Levi Stuart (100 Mile House)	Dave Hnatiuk (Grand Forks)
General Manager of the Year	Derek Stuart (Kimberley)	Terry Jones (Beaver Valley)	Brad Anstey (Merritt)	Levi Stuart (100 Mile House)	Brad Anstey (Merritt)

== Playoffs ==
The 2025 'Quest for the Teck cup' began on February 28, 2025 with the top four teams in each division making the playoffs, 1st played 4th and 2nd played 3rd in the division semi-finals. The winners met in the division final. The winners of those series met in the conference finals (Eddie Mountain V Neil Murdoch in the Kootenay and Doug Birks V Bill Ohlhausen in the Okanagan/Shuswap). The winners of the conference finals met in the Teck Cup Final. All series were best-of-seven with games 1, 2, 5, and 7 being hosted by the team with the superior regular-season record. This format, which was also used last year, was the same format as the previous season's for the first time since the 2018 and 2019 playoffs. The Grand Forks Border Bruins cruised to their first ever title with a 16–1 record including a ten-game winning streak to start the playoffs.

Division Semi-Finals
EM1	Kimberley	4
EM4	Creston Val.	2
EM2	Fernie	0
EM3	Columbia Val.	4
NM1	Grand Forks	4
NM4	Castlegar	0
NM2	Beaver Valley	4
NM3	Nelson	0
DB1	100 Mile House	4
DB4	Williams Lake	2
DB2	Kamloops	4
DB3	Quesnel	0
BO1	Princeton	4
BO4	Sicamous	1
BO2	Revelstoke	4
BO3	Merritt	1

Division Finals
Kimberley	4
Columbia Val.	1
Grand Forks	4
Beaver Valley	0
100 Mile House	4
Kamloops	2
Princeton	2
Revelstoke	4

Conference Finals
Kimberley	1
Grand Forks	4
100 Mile House	1
Revelstoke	4

2025 KIJHL Teck Cup Championship
Grand Forks	4
Revelstoke	0

== Mowat Cup ==
The Mowat Cup is the British Columbia Jr. A hockey championship between the champions of all the leagues in BC, a new format for the competition was required as the previous format of the winners of the KIJHL, PJHL, and VIJHL plus a fourth host team would no longer be feasible due to the VIJHL becoming an independent league as an affiliate for the BCHL in a manner similar to Jr. B. An announcement was made on February 27, the new format will be a best-thee-of-five series between the league champions of the KIJHL and PJHL, the PJHL champion, Ridge Meadows Flames will host games one and two with the KIJHL champ hosting games three, four and five. However, due to the ice being removed from the arena in Maple Ridge, the games hosted by the Flames were relocated to the George Preston Rec. Centre in Langley home of the PJHL's Trappers and the BCHL's Rivermen.

=== Game 1 ===
Grand Forks @ Ridge Meadows

April 22nd 2025; 19:00	Grand Forks Border Bruins	3-2 (1-0, 2-2, 3-2)	Ridge Meadows Flames	George Preston Rec. Centre, Langley

Game reference
Jasper Tait	Goalies	Matthew Candusso	Referees: Colby Georgsen; Bradon Koop; Linesmen: Taylor Baron; Owen Middleton
6 min	Penalties	8 min	Referees: Colby Georgsen; Bradon Koop; Linesmen: Taylor Baron; Owen Middleton
38	Shots	21	Referees: Colby Georgsen; Bradon Koop; Linesmen: Taylor Baron; Owen Middleton

=== Game 2 ===
Grand Forks @ Ridge Meadows

April 23rd 2025; 19:00	Grand Forks Border Bruins	5-3 (1-2, 2-2, 5-3)	Ridge Meadows Flames	George Preston Rec. Centre, Langley

Game reference
Jasper Tait	Goalies	Matthew Candusso	Referees: Brayden Stewart; Connor McCracken; Linesmen: Chris van Dedventer; Brayden Cameron
14 min	Penalties	8 min	Referees: Brayden Stewart; Connor McCracken; Linesmen: Chris van Dedventer; Brayden Cameron
31	Shots	29	Referees: Brayden Stewart; Connor McCracken; Linesmen: Chris van Dedventer; Brayden Cameron

=== Game 3 ===
Ridge Meadows @ Grand Forks

April 26th 2025; 19:00	Ridge Meadows Flames	5-4 (0-0, 2-3, 5-4)	Grand Forks Border Bruins	Jack Goddard Memorial Arena, Grand Forks

Game reference
Matthew Candusso	Goalies	Jasper Tait	Referees: Matt Hicketts; Ian Walker; Linesmen: Zachary Andersen; Ethan Crawford
4 min	Penalties	10 min	Referees: Matt Hicketts; Ian Walker; Linesmen: Zachary Andersen; Ethan Crawford
23	Shots	39	Referees: Matt Hicketts; Ian Walker; Linesmen: Zachary Andersen; Ethan Crawford

=== Game 4 ===
Ridge Meadows @ Grand Forks

April 27th 2025; 19:00	Ridge Meadows Flames	6-9 (1-3, 3-5, 6-9)	Grand Forks Border Bruins	Jack Goddard Memorial Arena, Grand Forks

Game reference
Matthew Candusso (L)(47:02) Josh Vallee (12:58)	Goalies	Eric Kahl	Referees: Dustin Minty; Derek Hatch; Linesmen: Maninder Cheema; Cody Wanner
23 min	Penalties	27 min	Referees: Dustin Minty; Derek Hatch; Linesmen: Maninder Cheema; Cody Wanner
36	Shots	40	Referees: Dustin Minty; Derek Hatch; Linesmen: Maninder Cheema; Cody Wanner
