= 2019–20 KIJHL season =

American and Canadian ice hockey season

- League: KIJHL
- Sport: Ice hockey
- Duration: September–February
- Games: 49
- Teams: 20
- League champions: Cancelled due to COVID-19

Seasons
- ← 2018–19 2020–21 →

The 2019–20 KIJHL season was the 53rd in league history. The regular season began on September 13, 2019, and ran until February 22nd 2020. The playoffs began the following week, but was cancelled on March 12, 2020, a few hours before puck drop of game 3 of the second round of the playoffs, due to the COVID-19 pandemic.

== Regular season ==
Teams played 49 games throughout the course of the season. Six against each team in the division, three against each team in the other division within the conference, and one against each team in the other conference. The Okanagan division of the Okanagan/Shuswap Conference was renamed to the Bill Ohlhausen Division, named after the recently retired commissioner of the KIJHL who was in power during the expansion to the region.

=== Standings ===
Eddie Mountain division
Team	W	L	OTL	T	Pts	GF	GA
Kimberley Dynamiters	40	6	3	0	83	198	111
Fernie Ghostriders	33	11	3	2	71	216	146
Columbia Valley Rockies	22	18	6	2	56	166	158
Creston Valley Thunder Cats	22	19	6	1	51	168	193
Golden Rockets	21	24	2	1	45	173	186

Neil Murdoch division
Team	W	L	OTL	T	Pts	GF	GA
Beaver Valley Nitehawks	30	11	5	3	68	182	140
Nelson Leafs	29	14	6	0	64	199	156
Spokane Braves	20	23	4	2	46	137	185
Castlegar Rebels	13	30	6	0	32	144	204
Grand Forks Border Bruins	13	31	4	1	31	143	233

Bill Ohlhausen division
Team	W	L	OTL	T	Pts	GF	GA
Kelowna Chiefs	32	12	2	3	69	186	130
Princeton Posse	26	16	5	1	58	175	155
Summerland Steam	21	19	4	1	47	162	174
North Okanagan Knights	17	25	5	1	40	125	187
Osoyoos Coyotes	9	37	2	1	21	126	233

Doug Birks division
Team	W	L	OTL	T	Pts	GF	GA
Revelstoke Grizzlies	39	5	3	1	82	224	108
Chase Heat	30	16	2	1	63	182	139
100 Mile House Wranglers	25	20	2	2	54	170	163
Kamloops Storm	21	26	2	0	44	145	153
Sicamous Eagles	15	29	1	1	32	140	207

== Playoffs ==
Division Semi Finals
Kimberley	4
Creston Valley	1
Fernie	0
Columbia Valley	4
Beaver Valley	4
Castlegar	0
Nelson	4
Spokane	0
Kelowna	4
North Okanagan	1
Princeton	4
Summerland	0
Revelstoke	4
Kamloops	0
Chase	1
100 Mile House	4

Division Finals
Kimberley	2
Columbia Valley	0
Beaver Valley	0
Nelson	2
Kelowna	1
Princeton	1
Revelstoke	1
100 Mile House	1

Conference Finals
Season
Cancelled
Season
Cancelled

2020 Teck Cup Championship
Season
Cancelled

League map
Legend
- Kootenay Conference
- Eddie Mountain Division
- 1 Golden Rockets
- 2 Columbia Valley Rockies
- 3 Fernie Ghostriders
- 4 Kimberley Dynamiters
- 5 Creston Thundercats
- Neil Murdoch Division
- 6 Nelson Leafs
- 7 Castlegar Rebels
- 8 Beaver Valley Nitehawks
- 9 Spokane Braves
- 10 Grand Forks Border Bruins
- Okanagan/Shuswap Conference
- Bill Ohlhausen Division
- 11 Osoyoos Coyotes
- 12 Princeton Posse
- 13 North Okanagan Knights
- 14 Kelowna Chiefs
- 15 Summerland Steam
- Doug Birks Division
- 16 Revelstoke Grizzlies
- 17 Sicamous Eagles
- 18 Chase Heat
- 19 Kamloops Storm
- 20 100 Mile House Wranglers
