= 2017–18 KIJHL season =

American and Canadian ice hockey season

- League: KIJHL
- Sport: Ice hockey
- Duration: September–February
- Games: 47
- Teams: 20
- League champions: Kimberley Dynamiters
- Runners-up: Revelstoke Grizzlies

Seasons
- ← 2016–17 2018–19 →

The 2017–18 KIJHL season was the 51st in league history. The regular season began on September 8, 2017, and continued until February 18, 2018. The playoffs began the following week, and ended when the Kimberley Dynamiters defeated the Revelstoke Grizzlies in six games to win the second championship in franchise history, and the first under the Dynamiters moniker. Due to a fatal amonia leak at the Fernie Memorial Arena, home of the Ghostriders, on October 17, all remaining Ghostriders home games were played at the Elk Valley Leisure Centre in Sparwood, an arena that previously housed the Elk Valley Raiders.

== Regular season ==
Teams played 47 games throughout the course of the season.

=== Standings ===
The final league standings were as follows.

Eddie Mountain division
Team	W	L	OTL	T	Pts	GF	GA
Kimberley Dynamiters	38	7	1	1	88	199	112
Creston Valley Thunder Cats	32	12	1	2	69	225	120
Columbia Valley Rockies	19	21	4	3	41	167	188
Fernie Ghostriders	15	28	3	3	36	153	214
Golden Rockets	3	40	3	1	10	85	269

Neil Murdoch division
Team	W	L	OTL	T	Pts	GF	GA
Nelson Leafs	33	9	3	2	71	164	101
Castlegar Rebels	30	13	2	2	64	199	121
Beaver Valley Nitehawks	27	15	3	2	59	170	127
Grand Forks Border Bruins	15	27	4	1	35	131	177
Spokane Braves	15	28	2	2	34	137	201

Okanagan division
Team	W	L	OTL	T	Pts	GF	GA
Osoyoos Coyotes	32	11	2	2	68	202	129
Kelowna Chiefs	27	15	4	1	59	221	171
Summerland Steam	27	16	3	1	58	173	156
Princeton Posse	17	24	4	2	40	130	177
North Okanagan Knights	14	26	4	3	35	110	1

Doug Birks division
Team	W	L	OTL	T	Pts	GF	GA
Revelstoke Grizzlies	34	8	3	2	73	212	123
Chase Heat	26	19	2	0	54	182	157
100 Mile House Wranglers	24	18	1	4	53	207	179
Kamloops Storm	18	24	2	3	41	146	171
Sicamous Eagles	6	37	2	2	16	90	236

== Playoffs ==
Division Semi Finals
Kimberley	4
Fernie	1
Creston Valley	2
Columbia Valley	4
Nelson	4
Grand Forks	1
Castlegar	4
Beaver Valley	3
Osoyoos	4
Princeton	0
Kelowna	4
Summerland	3
Revelstoke	4
Kamloops	2
Chase	4
100 Mile House	0

Division Finals
Kimberley	4
Columbia Valley	1
Nelson	4
Castlegar	1
Osoyoos	4
Kelowna	2
Revelstoke	4
100 Mile House	3

Conference Finals
Kimberley	4
Nelson	2
Osoyoos	3
Revelstoke	4

2018 Teck Cup Championship
Kimberley	4
Revelstoke	2

League map
Legend
- Kootenay Conference
- Eddie Mountain Division
- 1 Golden Rockets
- 2 Columbia Valley Rockies
- 3 Fernie Ghostriders
- 4 Kimberley Dynamiters
- 5 Creston Thundercats
- Neil Murdoch Division
- 6 Nelson Leafs
- 7 Castlegar Rebels
- 8 Beaver Valley Nitehawks
- 9 Spokane Braves
- 10 Grand Forks Border Bruins
- Okanagan/Shuswap Conference
- Okanagan Division
- 11 Osoyoos Coyotes
- 12 Princeton Posse
- 13 North Okanagan Knights
- 14 Kelowna Chiefs
- 15 Summerland Steam
- Doug Birks Division
- 16 Revelstoke Grizzlies
- 17 Sicamous Eagles
- 18 Chase Heat
- 19 Kamloops Storm
- 20 100 Mile House Wranglers
