= 2018–19 KIJHL season =

American and Canadian ice hockey season

- League: KIJHL
- Sport: Ice hockey
- Duration: September–February
- Games: 49
- Teams: 20
- League champions: Revelstoke Grizzlies
- Runners-up: Kimberley Dynamiters

Seasons
- ← 2017–18 2019–20 →

The 2018–19 KIJHL season was the 52nd in league history. The regular season began on September 7, 2018, and ran until February 24, 2019. The playoffs began the following week, and ended when the Revelstoke Grizzlies won their third championship in franchise history when they defeated the Kimberley Dynamiters 4–1 in the Teck Cup Final.

== Regular season ==
Teams played 49 games throughout the course of the season. Six against each team in the division, three against each team in the other division within the conference, and one against each team in the other conference.

=== Standings ===
The final standings were as follows.

Eddie Mountain division
Team	W	L	OTL	T	Pts	GF	GA
Kimberley Dynamiters	43	4	1	1	88	244	94
Fernie Ghostriders	26	15	4	4	60	168	134
Columbia Valley Rockies	22	21	4	2	50	159	182
Golden Rockets	22	23	5	2	48	152	175
Creston Valley Thunder Cats	10	35	4	0	24	128	219

Neil Murdoch division
Team	W	L	OTL	T	Pts	GF	GA
Nelson Leafs	35	12	0	2	72	200	130
Beaver Valley Nitehawks	27	11	5	3	68	182	140
Grand Forks Border Bruins	13	31	4	1	31	143	233
Spokane Braves	20	23	4	2	46	137	185
Castlegar Rebels	13	30	6	0	32	144	204

Okanagan division
Team	W	L	OTL	T	Pts	GF	GA
Kelowna Chiefs	43	3	2	1	89	265	105
Summerland Steam	25	20	2	2	54	166	155
Princeton Posse	19	25	4	1	43	128	175
Osoyoos Coyotes	17	29	1	1	37	121	191
North Okanagan Knights	16	32	0	0	32	129	197

Doug Birks division
Team	W	L	OTL	T	Pts	GF	GA
Revelstoke Grizzlies	42	6	1	0	83	265	105
100 Mile House Wranglers	25	19	3	2	65	168	141
Sicamous Eagles	17	24	5	3	42	111	164
Kamloops Storm	19	26	2	1	41	122	186
Chase Heat	14	31	2	2	32	146	218

== Playoffs ==
Division Semi Finals
Kimberley	4
Golden	0
Fernie	4
Columbia Valley	0
Nelson	4
Spokane	3
Beaver Valley	4
Grand Forks	0
Kelowna	4
Osoyoos	0
Summerland	4
Princeton	1
Revelstoke	4
Kamloops	0
100 Mile House	4
Sicamous	1

Division Finals
Kimberley	4
Fernie	0
Nelson	2
Beaver Valley	4
Kelowna	4
Summerland	1
Revelstoke	4
100 Mile House	0

Conference Finals
Kimberley	4
Beaver Valley	1
Revelstoke	2
Kelowna	4

2019 Teck Cup Championship
Kimberley	1
Revelstoke	4

League map
Legend
- Kootenay Conference
- Eddie Mountain Division
- 1 Golden Rockets
- 2 Columbia Valley Rockies
- 3 Fernie Ghostriders
- 4 Kimberley Dynamiters
- 5 Creston Thundercats
- Neil Murdoch Division
- 6 Nelson Leafs
- 7 Castlegar Rebels
- 8 Beaver Valley Nitehawks
- 9 Spokane Braves
- 10 Grand Forks Border Bruins
- Okanagan/Shuswap Conference
- Okanagan Division
- 11 Osoyoos Coyotes
- 12 Princeton Posse
- 13 North Okanagan Knights
- 14 Kelowna Chiefs
- 15 Summerland Steam
- Doug Birks Division
- 16 Revelstoke Grizzlies
- 17 Sicamous Eagles
- 18 Chase Heat
- 19 Kamloops Storm
- 20 100 Mile House Wranglers
