= 2023–24 KIJHL season =

American and Canadian ice hockey season

- League: KIJHL
- Sport: Ice hockey
- Duration: September - February
- Games: 44
- Teams: 20
- Streaming partner: flohockey.tv
- League champions: Revelstoke Grizzlies
- Runners-up: Fernie Ghostriders
- Season MVP: Tristan Weill
- Top scorer: Luke Chakrabarti

Seasons
- ← 2022–23 2024–25 →

The 2023–24 KIJHL season was the 57th in league history, beginning on Friday, September 22, 2023, and ending on April 9, 2024, with the Revelstoke Grizzlies defeating the Fernie Ghostriders 7-1 in game four of the Teck Cup Finals to win their second championship in three years, and fifth in franchise history.

== Season highlights ==
The 2024 BCHC was held at the McArthur Park Arena in Kamloops. It was the second annual showcase for scouts to observe players from both the KIJHL and the PJHL. Team PJHL won 5-3.

The Spokane Braves returned after being absent for three seasons due to the COVID-19 pandemic.

In 2023, governing body BC Hockey announced plans to restructure its junior hockey framework. The three Junior B leagues (PJHL, KIJHL and VIJHL) were summarily designated as "Junior A Tier 2", with plans to conduct an independent evaluation of those teams seeking to be promoted to "Junior A Tier 1". It was expected that those teams promoted to Tier 1 would eventually apply for membership in the CJHL. The league expected the evaluations to be completed during the 2024-25 season. In April 2024, the VIJHL announced that it would withdraw from the Hockey Canada framework and become an independent farm league for the BCHL beginning in the 2024-25 season.

== Regular season ==
Teams played a 44-game regular season schedule, including six games against each team within their division, two games against each team in the other division of the same conference, and one game against each team in the other conference.

=== Standings ===
Eddie Mountain division
Team	W	L	OTL	Pts	GF	GA
Fernie Ghostriders	29	11	4	62	163	121
Kimberley Dynamiters	29	13	2	60	171	113
Columbia Valley Rockies	25	14	5	55	149	122
Creston Valley Thunder Cats	21	17	5	47	146	146
Golden Rockets	8	31	5	21	105	187

Neil Murdoch division
Team	W	L	OTL	Pts	GF	GA
Beaver Valley Nitehawks	32	9	3	67	206	111
Grand Forks Border Bruins	28	11	5	61	184	145
Nelson Leafs	24	17	3	51	167	159
Castlegar Rebels	20	19	5	45	135	142
Spokane Braves	11	32	1	23	133	247

Bill Ohlhausen division
Team	W	L	OTL	Pts	GF	GA
Princeton Posse	35	8	1	71	208	96
North Okanagan Knights	18	20	6	42	123	158
Osoyoos Coyotes	16	24	4	36	121	177
Kelowna Chiefs	16	24	4	36	116	157
Summerland Steam	9	29	6	24	74	199

Doug Birks division
Team	W	L	OTL	Pts	GF	GA
Revelstoke Grizzlies	34	8	2	70	193	83
Kamloops Storm	31	11	2	64	167	102
Sicamous Eagles	31	12	1	63	190	126
Chase Heat	12	29	3	27	123	192
100 Mile House Wranglers	11	28	5	27	105	196

Source: "KIJHL team stats 2024–25 regular season". kijhl.ca.

League map
1 Golden Rockets
2 Columbia Valley Rockies
3 Fernie Ghostriders
4 Kimberley Dynamiters
5 Creston Valley Thundercats
6 Nelson Leafs
7 Castlegar Rebels
8 Beaver Valley Nitehawks
9 Spokane Braves
10 Grand Forks Border Bruins
11 Osoyoos Coyotes
12 Princeton Posse
13 North Okanagan Knights
14 Kelowna Chiefs
15 Summerland Steam
16 Revelstoke Grizzlies
17 Sicamous Eagles
18 Chase Heat
19 Kamloops Storm
20 100 Mile House Wranglers

== Awards ==
Award	League Winner	Eddie Mountain Winner	Neil Murdoch Winner	Doug Birks Winner	Bill Ohlhausen Winner
MVP	Nate Murdoch, Kimberley	Nate Murdoch, Kimberley	Kaleb Percival, Beaver Valley	Daniel Kroon, Sicamous	Josh Hader, North Okanagan
Top Scorer	Luke Chakrabarti, Creston Valley	Luke Chakrabarti, Creston Valley	Zach Baumann, Spokane	Owen Dewitt & Hayden Evans, Sicamous	Anmol Garcha, Princeton
Top Defenceman	Max Chakrabarti, Creston Valley	Max Chakrabarti, Creston Valley	Kaleb Percival, Beaver Valley	Mikkel Hrechka, Revelstoke	Lucas Sadownyk, Princeton
Top Goaltender	Jozef Kuchaslo, Revelstoke	Nate Glenn, Columbia Valley	Connor Stojan, Beaver Valley	Jozef Kuchaslo, Revelstoke	Josh Hader, North Okanagan
Rookie of the Year	Owen Dewitt, Sicamous	Carter Velker, Columbia Valley	Zach Baumann, Spokane	Owen Dewitt, Sicamous	Vinay Junek, Princeton
Most Sportsmanlike	Tyson Horiachka, Princeton	Tyson Tokarz, Creston Valley	Dawson Davis, Nelson	Jalen Davidson, Chase	Tyson Horiachka, Princeton
Coach of the Year	Jiri Novak, Revelstoke	Ty Valin, Fernie	Terry Jones, Beaver Valley	Jiri Novak, Revelstoke	Mark Readman, Princeton

Source: "2023–24 KIJHL individual awards". kijhl.ca.

== Playoffs ==
The 2024 playoffs began with 16 teams in competition.

Division Semi Finals
Fernie	4
Creston Valley	1
Kimberley	1
Columbia Valley	4
Beaver Valley	4
Castlegar	0
Grand Forks	4
Nelson	1
Princeton	4
Kelowna	1
North Okanagan	4
Osoyoos	0
Revelstoke	4
Chase	0
Kamloops	4
Sicamous	3

Division Finals
Fernie	4
Columbia Valley	2
Beaver Valley	4
Grand Forks	2
Princeton	4
North Okanagan	3
Revelstoke	4
Kamloops	0

Conference Finals
Fernie	4
Beaver Valley	2
Princeton	3
Revelstoke	4

2024 Teck Cup Championship
Fernie	0
Revelstoke	4
