= 2022–23 KIJHL season =

American and Canadian ice hockey season

- League: KIJHL
- Sport: Ice hockey
- Duration: September – February
- Games: 44
- Teams: 19
- Streaming partner: flohockey.tv
- League champions: Kimberley Dyanimters
- Runners-up: Princeton Posse

Seasons
- ← 2021–22 2023–24 →

The 2022-23 KIJHL season was the 56th in league history. The season began on September 23, 2022, and finished on February 11, 2023, with the playoffs beginning the following week and running until April 10 when the Kimberley Dynamiters defeated the Princeton Posse 3–2 in Princeton to win the Teck Cup Finals 4–3, for the fourth time in franchise history. The season was originally scheduled to feature all 20 teams in the league but the league's sole U.S. franchise, the Spokane Braves withdrew on August 3 resulting with the season continuing with just 19 teams.

== Regular season ==
Teams played 44 games throughout the course of the regular season: six games against each team in the division, two games against each team in the other division within the same conference and one game against each team in the other conference. To make up for the absence of the Spokane Braves, teams in the Doug Birks hosted a sixth game against a Bill Ohlhausen team, the Eddie Mountain division played one extra home and away game within the Division, and the Neil Murdoch would play two extra games against each of the other three teams within the division.

League map

League map
Legend
- Kootenay Conference
- Eddie Mountain Division
- 1 Golden Rockets
- 2 Columbia Valley Rockies
- 3 Fernie Ghostriders
- 4 Kimberley Dynamiters
- 5 Creston Thundercats
- Neil Murdoch Division
- 6 Nelson Leafs
- 7 Castlegar Rebels
- 8 Beaver Valley Nitehawks
- 9 Grand Forks Border Bruins
- Okanagan/Shuswap Conference
- Bill Ohlhausen Division
- 10 Osoyoos Coyotes
- 11 Summerland Steam
- 12 Princeton Posse
- 13 North Okanagan Knights
- 14 Kelowna Chiefs
- Doug Birks Division
- 15 100 Mile House Wranglers
- 16 Revelstoke Grizzlies
- 17 Sicamous Eagles
- 18 Chase Heat
- 19 Kamloops Storm

=== Standings ===
The final standings were as follows.

Eddie Mountain division
| Team | W | L | OTL | Pts | GF | GA |
|---|---|---|---|---|---|---|
| Columbia Valley Rockies | 31 | 9 | 4 | 66 | 218 | 126 |
| Kimberley Dynamiters | 29 | 13 | 2 | 60 | 171 | 113 |
| Golden Rockets | 25 | 16 | 5 | 53 | 175 | 168 |
| Fernie Ghostriders | 23 | 14 | 7 | 53 | 163 | 138 |
| Creston Valley Thunder Cats | 19 | 23 | 2 | 40 | 147 | 189 |

Neil Murdoch division
| Team | W | L | OTL | Pts | GF | GA |
|---|---|---|---|---|---|---|
| Grand Forks Border Bruins | 25 | 16 | 3 | 53 | 146 | 133 |
| Nelson Leafs | 24 | 15 | 5 | 53 | 150 | 137 |
| Beaver Valley Nitehawks | 24 | 17 | 3 | 51 | 192 | 136 |
| Castlegar Rebels | 11 | 28 | 5 | 27 | 103 | 169 |

Bill Ohlhausen division
| Team | W | L | OTL | Pts | GF | GA |
|---|---|---|---|---|---|---|
| Princeton Posse | 31 | 7 | 6 | 68 | 181 | 110 |
| Osoyoos Coyotes | 27 | 13 | 4 | 58 | 188 | 140 |
| North Okanagan Knights | 22 | 16 | 4 | 50 | 143 | 144 |
| Summerland Steam | 14 | 24 | 6 | 34 | 104 | 165 |
| Kelowna Chiefs | 6 | 34 | 4 | 16 | 95 | 205 |

Doug Birks division
| Team | W | L | OTL | Pts | GF | GA |
|---|---|---|---|---|---|---|
| Revelstoke Grizzlies | 30 | 7 | 7 | 67 | 153 | 95 |
| Kamloops Storm | 26 | 13 | 5 | 57 | 145 | 105 |
| Sicamous Eagles | 26 | 15 | 3 | 55 | 158 | 111 |
| 100 Mile House Wranglers | 16 | 24 | 4 | 36 | 111 | 167 |
| Chase Heat | 10 | 30 | 4 | 24 | 93 | 194 |

=== 2022 BCHC prospects game ===
The BCHC held its first annual prospects game in Chilliwack on November 22, 2022, with team KIJHL defeating the PJHL team 4–3 with Jonathan Ward of the Princeton Posse scoring the game-winning goal 2:09 into the third period.

=== Leafs-Nitehawks line brawl ===
On December 31, 2022, all ten players dropped the gloves in a line brawl instigated by the Leafs at the start of the second period of the New Year's Eve Classic between the Neil Murdoch Division Rivals. The brawl was possibly instagted by an open-ice hit on the Leafs' goaltender late in the first or a cross-check to the head of a Leafs player at the buzzer that left his jersey covered in blood, as neither incidents earned a call the referee in charge of the game. A total of 172 penalty minutes were handed out (75 to Beaver Valley, 97 to Nelson). After the game, Leafs' head coach Adam Dibella resigned for his role in the fight and faced harsh criticism from Leafs fans and a harsher suspension from the league. In addition, the league suspended the nine Leafs' players involved for a total of 35 games and the five Nitehawks' players for 9 games. The Leafs would go on to win 3–1.

== Awards ==
| Award | League Winner | Eddie Mountain Winner | Neil Murdoch Winner | Doug Birks Winner | Bill Ohlhausen Winner |
|---|---|---|---|---|---|
| MVP | Luke Chakrabarti, Creston Valley | Luke Chakrabarti, Creston Valley | Nathan Dominici, Beaver Valley | Carter Bettenson, Revesltoke | Jack Henderson, Osoyoos |
| Top Scorer | Luke Chakrabarti, Creston Valley | Luke Chakrabarti, Creston Valley | Spencer Horning, Grand Forks | Ryan Larsen, Kamloops | Jack Henderson, Osoyoos |
| Top Defenceman | Cameron Reid, Kimberley | Cameron Reid, Kimberley | Tyson Lautard, Nelson | Nicholas Hughes, Sicamous | Curtis Gould, Princeton |
| Top Goaltender | Jozef Kuchaslo, Revelstoke | Trystan Self, Kimberley | Connor Stojan, Beaver Valley | Jozef Kuchaslo, Revelstoke | Peyton Trzaska, Princeton |
| Rookie of the Year | Keenan Ingram, Columbia Valley | Keenan Ingram, Columbia Valley | Russell Kosec, Grand Forks | Owen Aura, Kamloops | Austin Seibel, North Okanagan |
| Most Sportsmanlike | Matthew Johnston, North Okanagan | Nick Morin, Golden | Chad Bates, Grand Forks | Jack Mulder, 100 Mile House | Matthew Johnston, North Okanagan |
| Coach of the Year | Mark Readman, Princeton | Chuck Wright, Golden | Dave Hnatiuk, Grand Forks | Nick Deschenes, Sicamous | Mark Readman, Princeton |

== Playoffs ==
The 2023 playoff format was as follows: the top four teams in the Doug Birks, Bill Ohlhausen, and Eddie Mountain Division would make the playoffs as would the top three teams in the Neil Murdoch and the best ranked Kootenay Conference team not already in the playoffs which would be referred to as the "crossover team". In each of the Okanagan Divisions and the Eddie Mountain division the 1st Seed would play 4th and 2nd would play 3rd. In the Neil Murdoch division, if the crossover team was 4th in the Neil Murdoch the format would be the same as the other three divisions. However, if the crossover team was the 5th ranked team in the Eddie Mountain, the 1st seed in the Neil Murdoch would have the choice of Neil Murdoch #3 or Eddie Mountain #5 in the first round. As it happened the Creston Thundercats earned this crossover spot and the Neil Murdoch champion, Grand Forks chose to play them over the Beaver Valley Nitehawks.

Division Semi Finals
Columbia Valley | 2
Fernie | 4
Kimberley | 4
Golden | 1
Grand Forks | 1
Creston | 4
Nelson | 2
Beaver Valley | 4
Princeton | 4
Summerland | 0
Osoyoos | 1
North Okanagan | 4
Revelstoke | 4
100 Mile House | 0
Kamloops | 3
Sicamous | 4

Division Finals
Kimberley | 4
Fernie | 3
Creston | 3
Beaver Valley | 4
Princeton | 4
North Okanagan | 1
Revelstoke | 4
Sicamous | 0

Conference Finals
Kimberley | 4
Beaver Valley | 0
Princeton | 4
Revelstoke | 2

2023 Teck Cup Championship
Kimberley | 4
Princeton | 3
