= 2021–22 KIJHL season =

American and Canadian ice hockey season

- League: KIJHL
- Sport: Ice hockey
- Duration: October – February
- Games: 42
- Teams: 19
- Streaming partner: flohockey.tv
- League champions: Revelstoke Grizzlies
- Runners-up: Nelson Leafs

Seasons
- ← 2020–21 2022–23 →

The 2021–22 KIJHL season was the 55th in league history and the first since the COVID-19 pandemic. The season began on October 1, 2021, and ran until February 19, 2024. The playoffs began February 22 and ran until March 31 when the Revelstoke Grizzlies won 6–4 at home over the Nelson Leafs to win the Teck Cup four games to one, hosting the trophy for the fourth time in franchise history.

== COVID-19 restrictions ==
Due to the ongoing COVID-19 pandemic the Spokane Braves were forced to drop out of the season on August 18 due to obstacles crossing the Canada-US border. In addition no inter-conference games were to be played until the league championship. All on-ice officials, players, and bench staff had to be fully vaccinated prior to the start of the season. Mask mandates, capacity restrictions, and proof of vaccination to enter followed health mandates from the province as the season was played.

== Regular season ==
=== Format changes ===
In the off season the KIJHL changed the rules for how ties would be broken after regulation time, previously two five-minute four-on-four overtime periods were used to determine the winner, if neither team could score the game would end in a tie. This season the league introduced NHL-style tiebreaking, a single five-minute three-on-three overtime would be used instead, if the tie was still not broken a three-round shootout would be used, with extra rounds added as needbe.

League map
Legend
- Kootenay Conference
- Eddie Mountain Division
- 1 Golden Rockets
- 2 Columbia Valley Rockies
- 3 Fernie Ghostriders
- 4 Kimberley Dynamiters
- 5 Creston Thundercats
- Neil Murdoch Division
- 6 Nelson Leafs
- 7 Castlegar Rebels
- 8 Beaver Valley Nitehawks
- 9 Grand Forks Border Bruins
- Okanagan/Shuswap Conference
- Bill Ohlhausen Division
- 10 Osoyoos Coyotes
- 11 Summerland Steam
- 12 Princeton Posse
- 13 North Okanagan Knights
- 14 Kelowna Chiefs
- Doug Birks Division
- 15 100 Mile House Wranglers
- 16 Revelstoke Grizzlies
- 17 Sicamous Eagles
- 18 Chase Heat
- 19 Kamloops Storm

=== Standings ===
The final standings were as follows.

Eddie Mountain division
Team	W	L	OTL	Pts	GF	GA
Kimberley Dynamiters	31	9	2	64	157	84
Columbia Valley Rockies	30	9	3	63	158	123
Fernie Ghostriders	22	15	5	49	123	123
Creston Valley Thunder Cats	19	22	1	39	131	133
Golden Rockets	13	26	3	29	109	169

Neil Murdoch division
Team	W	L	OTL	Pts	GF	GA
Nelson Leafs	31	10	1	63	171	93
Beaver Valley Nitehawks	22	17	3	47	155	144
Castlegar Rebels	16	24	2	34	115	151
Grand Forks Border Bruins	5	34	3	13	79	178

Bill Ohlhausen division
Team	W	L	OTL	Pts	GF	GA
Osoyoos Coyotes	33	3	6	72	210	116
Kelowna Chiefs	26	13	3	55	158	135
Summerland Steam	22	16	4	48	148	163
Princeton Posse	15	24	3	33	124	165
North Okanagan Knights	10	25	7	27	106	166

Doug Birks division
Team	W	L	OTL	Pts	GF	GA
Revelstoke Grizzlies	31	9	2	64	145	84
Kamloops Storm	28	10	4	60	141	91
Chase Heat	20	15	7	47	152	144
Sicamous Eagles	14	25	3	31	111	140
100 Mile House Wranglers	11	29	2	24	85	176

== Awards ==
The season's various award winners were as follows.

Award	League Winner	Eddie Mountain Winner	Neil Murdoch Winner	Doug Birks Winner	Bill Ohlhausen Winner
MVP	Jack Henderson, Osoyoos	Trystan Self, Kimberley	Griffen Ryden, Castlegar	Jacob Biensch, Chase	Jack Henderson, Osoyoos
Top Scorer	Jack Henderson, Osoyoos	Kayde Kinaschuk, Columbia Valley	Hayden Stocks, Beaver Valley	Jacob Biensch, Chase	Jack Henderson, Osoyoos
Top Defenceman	Brandon Gallo, Revelstoke	Cameron Reid, Kimberley	Bryce Sookro, Nelson	Brandon Gallo, Revelstoke	Ty Marchant, Kelowna
Top Goaltender	Trystan Self, Kimberley	Trystan Self, Kimberley	Dylan Marshall, Nelson	Colton Phillips-Watts, Kamloops	Frederick LaRochelle, Kelowna
Rookie of the Year	Kayde Kinaschuk, Columbia Valley	Kayde Kinaschuk, Columbia Valley	Bryce Sookro, Nelson	Zakery Anderson, Kamloops	Tristan Weill, Summerland
Most Sportsmanlike	Matthew Johnston, North Okanagan	Corbin Cockerill, Creston Valley	Tyson Lautard, Nelson	Reid Stumpf, 100 Mile House	Matthew Johnston, North Okanagan
Coach of the Year	Derek Stuart, Kimberley	Derek Stuart, Kimberley	Mario Dibella, Nelson	Geoff Grimwood, Kamloops	Carter Rigby, Osoyoos

== Playoffs ==
The 2022 playoffs began on February 22. The original playoff format would see the top four teams in each division, except the Neil Murdoch which would have three, make the playoffs and the next best team in the Kootenay Conference occupying the final spot in the Neil Murdoch Division playoffs, however after the Grand Forks Border Bruins were eliminated from making the playoffs it became increasingly likely that the Golden Rockets, representing the longest and most costly opponent for the Neil Murdoch Division champions, would move into the Neil Murdoch Division, the KIJHL opted to move the Creston Valley Thunder Cats instead.

Division Semi Finals
Kimberley	4
Golden	0
Columbia Valley	4
Fernie	2
Nelson	4
Castlegar	3
Beaver Valley	4
Creston Valley	3
Revelstoke	4
Sicamous	0
Kamloops	4
Chase	3
Osoyoos	4
Princeton	1
Kelowna	1
Summerland	4

Division Finals
Kimberley	4
Columbia Valley	2
Nelson	4
Beaver Valley	2
Revelstoke	4
Kamloops	2
Osoyoos	4
Summerland	2

Conference Finals
Kimberley	2
Nelson	4
Revelstoke	4
Osoyoos	0

2023 Teck Cup Championship
Nelson	1
Revelstoke	4
