= 2020–21 KIJHL season =

American and Canadian ice hockey season

- League: KIJHL
- Sport: Ice hockey
- Duration: November
- Games: 30-Cancelled after 4
- Teams: 17
- Streaming partner: flohockey.tv
- League champions: Cancelled due to COVID-19

Seasons
- ← 2019–20 2021–22 →

The 2020–21 KIJHL season was the 54th in league history but was temporarily suspended on November 26, 2020, just two weeks into the shortened season. Originally, the league planned to resume play on December 7 but the season was officially cancelled on February 6, 2021, due to the ongoing pandemic.

== Regular season ==
Due to COVID-19 restrictions the regular season was originally scheduled into two phases with teams restricted to cohorts due to the pandemic. The league would proceed with just seventeen teams as the Spokane Braves were unable to play due to COVID-19 restrictions. The Beaver Valley Nitehawks and 100 Mile House Wranglers both opted to pass on the season due to financial concerns

=== Cohort structure ===
League map
Legend
- Kootenay Conference
- Eddie Mountain Division
- 1 Golden Rockets
- 2 Columbia Valley Rockies
- 3 Fernie Ghostriders
- 4 Kimberley Dynamiters
- 5 Creston Thundercats
- Neil Murdoch Division
- 6 Nelson Leafs
- 7 Castlegar Rebels
- 8 Grand Forks Border Bruins
- 9 Osoyoos Coyotes
- Okanagan/Shuswap Conference
- Bill Ohlhausen Division
- 10 Princeton Posse
- 11 Summerland Steam
- 12 Kelowna Chiefs
- 13 North Okanagan Knights
- Doug Birks Division
- 14 Revelstoke Grizzlies
- 15 Sicamous Eagles
- 16 Chase Heat
- 17 Kamloops Storm

==== Phase 1 (12 games) ====
===== Cohort 1-Eddie Mountain =====
- Columbia Valley Rockies
- Fernie Ghostriders
- Kimberley Dynamiters
- Creston Valley Thundercats

===== Cohort 2-Neil Murdoch =====
- Nelson Leafs
- Castlegar Rebels
- Grand Forks Border Bruins
- Osoyoos Coyotes

===== Cohort 3-Shushwap =====
- Golden Rockets
- Sicamous Eagles
- Revelstoke Grizzlies

===== Cohort 4-Doug Birks =====
- Chase Heat
- Kamloops Storm
- North Okanagan Knights

===== Cohort 5-Bill Ohlhausen =====
- Kelowna Chiefs
- Princeton Posse
- Summerland Steam

==== Phase 2a (18 games) ====
===== Cohort 1-Eddie Mountain =====
- Golden Rockets
- Columbia Valley Rockies
- Fernie Ghostriders
- Kimberley Dynamiters

===== Cohort 2-Neil Murdoch =====
- Creston Valley Thundercats
- Nelson Leafs
- Castlegar Rebels
- Grand Forks Border Bruins

==== Phase 2b (8 games) ====
===== Cohort 1-Doug Birks =====
- Revelstoke Grizzlies
- Kamloops Storm
- Chase Heat

===== Cohort 2-Okanagan =====
- Kelowna Chiefs
- North Okanagan Knights
- Sicamous Eagles

===== Cohort 3-Bill Ohlhausen =====
- Osoyoos Coyotes
- Princeton Posse
- Summerland Steam

===== Cohort 1-Doug Birks =====
- Revelstoke Grizzlies
- Sicamous Eagles
- Kamloops Storm

===== Cohort 2-Okanagan =====
- Summerland Steam
- Chase Heat
- North Okanagan Knights

===== Cohort 3-Bill Ohlhausen =====
- Kelowna Chiefs
- Princeton Posse
- Osoyoos Coyotes

==== Phase 2d (2 games) ====
Teams playing in phases 2b and 2c were to play 2 games against regional opponent(s) to complete a thirty-game schedule, these games were unscheduled when the original schedule was released and as such when the season was cancelled the games were not scheduled. Phase 2a was to be played at the same time as phases 2b,2c, and 2d.

=== Standings ===
The Osoyoos Coyotes would move from the Bill Ohlhausen Division to the Neil Murdoch Division to balance the number of teams in each division.

Eddie Mountain division
Team	W	L	OTL	Pts	GF	GA
Columbia Valley Rockies	3	0	0	6	16	6
Fernie Ghostriders	2	1	0	4	10	13
Kimberley Dynamiters	1	1	1	3	13	9
Golden Rockets	0	2	0	0	4	11
Creston Valley Thunder Cats	0	3	0	0	5	16

Neil Murdoch division
Team	W	L	OTL	Pts	GF	GA
Nelson Leafs	3	0	0	6	24	7
Castlegar Rebels	2	1	0	4	14	16
Osoyoos Coyotes	1	1	1	3	10	11
Grand Forks Border Bruins	0	3	0	3	10	11

Bill Ohlhausen division
Team	W	L	OTL	Pts	GF	GA
Summerland Steam	2	1	0	4	9	8
Kelowna Chiefs	2	2	0	4	11	11
Princeton Posse	1	2	0	2	6	7
North Okanagan Knights	0	2	1	1	10	17

Doug Birks division
Team	W	L	OTL	Pts	GF	GA
Chase Heat	2	0	1	5	16	11
Kamloops Storm	2	0	0	4	6	4
Revelstoke Grizzlies	2	0	0	4	15	10
Sicamous Eagles	1	1	0	2	7	10
