= Penticton Lakers =

- City: Penticton, British Columbia
- League: Kootenay International Junior Hockey League
- Conference: Okanagan/Shuswap
- Division: Okanagan
- Founded: 2009–10
- Home arena: South Okanagan Events Centre
- Colours: Purple, gold, black and white
- General manager: (Canada)
- Head coach: (Canada)
- Captain: (Canada)
- Website: www.hockeyacademy.ca/

Franchise history
- 2001–09: Summerland Sting
- 2009-13: Penticton Lakers
- 2013-present: 100 Mile House Wranglers

The Penticton Lakers were a junior 'B' Ice Hockey team based in Penticton, British Columbia, Canada. They were members of the Okanagan Division of the Okanagan/Shuswap of the Kootenay International Junior Hockey League (KIJHL) and were part of the Okanagan Hockey Academy. They played their home games at the South Okanagan Events Centre. They were last coached by Robert Dirk.

The Lakers were relocated to 100 Mile House prior to the start of the 2013-14 KIJHL season due to arena difficulties and poor attendance, largely to blame on superior competition from the Junior A Penticton Vees, and were renamed as the 100 Mile House Wranglers.

== Season-by-season record ==
Note: GP = Games played, W = Wins, L = Losses, T = Ties, OTL = Overtime Losses, Pts = Points, GF = Goals for, GA = Goals against

Records as of February 19, 2012.

Season	GP	W	L	T	OTL	Pts	GF	GA	Finish	Playoffs
2009-10	50	14	32	0	4	32	148	224	6th, Okanagan	Lost in Division Semifinals, 0-3 (Eagles)
2010-11	50	12	37	0	1	25	128	215	4th, Okanagan	Lost in Division Semifinals, 0-4 (Coyotes)
2011-12	52	25	19	1	7	58	170	170	3rd, Okanagan	Lost in Division Semifinals, 3-4 (Posse)

=== Playoffs ===
Records as of March 4, 2012.

Season	Division Semifinals	Division Finals	Conference Finals	KIJHL Championship
2009-10	L, 0-3, Sicamous	—	—	—
2010-11	L, 0-4, Osoyoos	—	—	—
2011-12	L, 3-4, Princeton	—	—	—

== Awards and trophies ==
Rookie of the Year

- Devon Krogh: 2006-2007

Most Sportsmanlike

- Thomas Simkins: 2004-2005
