= Quesnel River Rush =

Canadian junior ice hockey team

- City: Quesnel, British Columbia
- League: KIJHL (2009-2026); BCHC (2026-present)
- Division: Interior
- Founded: 2009
- Home arena: West Fraser Centre
- Colours: Burgundy, Yellow, Grey and Black
- Owner: Tracy Mero
- President: Tracy Mero
- General manager: Logan Maxwell
- Head coach: Logan Maxwell
- Captain: Vacant
- Website: quesnelriverrush.com

Franchise history
- 2009–2024: North Okanagan Knights
- 2024–2026: Quensel River Rush (KIJHL)
- 2026–present: Quensel River Rush (BCHC)

The Quesnel River Rush are a Junior 'A' ice hockey team based in Quesnel, British Columbia, Canada. They are set to compete in the Interior Division in the British Columbia Hockey Conference (BCHC) beginning in the 2026–27 season after playing in the Kootenay International Junior Hockey League (KIJHL). The team plays its home games at the 1,300-seat West Fraser Centre. Before moving to Quesnel in 2024, the team was based in Armstrong, British Columbia and was known as the North Okanagan Knights.

== History ==
The Knights joined the KIJHL in 2009, but finished dead-last in the Okanagan Division with a record of 11–35–0–4, missing the playoffs. In 2010–11, the Knights joined the new Doug Birks Division, but finished last again, losing 4-1 in the first round of the playoffs to Revelstoke. For 2011–12, the Knights improved to third place in the Doug Birks Division, with a record of 35–16–0–1, before losing to Kamloops in the first round of the playoffs. The following year the Knights won the Doug Birks Division for the first time, and reached the league championship series, losing in six games to Castlegar. For 2013–14, the Knights were moved to the Okanagan Division, following the relocation of the Okanagan Division's Penticton Lakers to 100 Mile House. They finished fourth in their new division, but defeated the division champions Summerland Steam in seven games in the first round, before losing to Osoyoos. In 2014–15, the Knights struggled immensely, finishing with a record of 6–41–1–4, and failed to make the playoffs. The following year, the Knights compiled a 14-30-3-0-5 record, finishing fourth in the Okanagan Division. They lost, 0–4, to Osoyoos in the first round.

The North Okanagan Knights relocated to Quesnel, British Columbia, Canada in April 2024.

On April 20, 2026, the River Rush were named as one of 22 teams joining the BCHC, leaving the KIJHL with the remaining 12 teams.

== Season-by-season record ==
=== North Okanagan Knights ===
Note: GP = Games played, W = Wins, L = Losses, T = Ties, OTL = Overtime Losses, PTS = Points, GF = Goals for, GA = Goals against

Season	GP	W	L	T	OTL	PTS	GF	GA	Finish	Playoffs
2009-10	50	11	35	0	4	26	149	250	7th of 7, Okanagan; 15th of 17, KIJHL	Did not qualify
2010–11	50	18	30	1	1	38	146	198	4th of 4, Doug Birks; 14th of 18, KIJHL	Lost Division Semifinals, 1-4 (Grizzlies)
2011-12	52	35	16	0	1	71	202	165	3rd of 5, Doug Birks; 7th of 20, KIJHL	Lost Division Semifinals, 3-4 (Storm)
2012-13	52	34	14	2	2	72	214	149	1st of 5, Doug Birks; 4th of 20, KIJHL	Lost in Finals, 1-4 (Rebels)
2013-14	52	24	26	0	2	50	168	195	4th of 5, Okanagan; 12th of 20, KIJHL	Lost division finals, 1-4 (Coyotes)
2014-15	52	6	41	1	4	17	93	235	5th of 5, Okanagan; 20th of 20, KIJHL	Did not qualify
2015-16	52	14	30	3	5	36	116	159	4th of 5, Okanagan; 16th of 20, KIJHL	Lost Division Semifinals, 0-4 (Coyotes)
2016-17	47	15	29	2	1	33	119	167	4th of 5 Okanagan; 15th of 20 - KIJHL	Lost Division Semifinals, 0-4 (Coyotes)
2017-18	47	14	26	3	4	35	110	174	5th of 5 Okanagan; 16th of 20 - KIJHL	Did not qualify
2018-19	49	16	33	0	0	32	129	197	5th of 5 Okanagan; 17th of 20, KIJHL	Did not qualify
2019-20	49	13	30	1	5	32	110	174	4th of 5 Bill Ohlhausen; 18th of 20, KIJHL	Lost Division Semifinals, 1-4 (Chiefs)
2020–21	3	0	2	0	1	1	10	17	Remaining season cancelled due to COVID-19	
2021–22	42	10	25	0	7	27	106	166	5th of 5 Bill Ohlhausen; 17th of 19, KIJHL	Did not qualify
2022–23	44	22	16	0	6	50	143	144	3rd of 5 Bill Ohlhausen; 13th of 19, KIJHL	Won Division Semifinals, 4-1 (Coyotes); Lost division finals 1-4 (Posse)
2023–24	44	18	20	0	6	42	123	158	2nd of 5, Bill Ohlhausen; 13th of 20, KIJHL	Won Division Semifinals, 4-0 (Coyotes); Lost Division finals 3-4 (Posse)
Quensel River Rush
2024-25	44	19	19	3	3	44	167	186	3rd of 5 Doug Burks Div; 7th of 11 O/S Conf; 12th of 21 -KIJHL	Lost Div Semis, 0-4 (Storm)

== Playoffs ==
Records as of March 18, 2024.

Season	Division Semifinals	Division Finals	Conference Finals	KIJHL Championship
2009–10	Did not qualify			
2010-11	L, 1–4, Revelstoke	—	—	—
2011-12	L, 3–4, Kamloops	—	—	—
2012-13	W, 4–1, Kamloops	W, 4–0, Sicamous	W, 4–3, Osoyoos	L, 1–4, Castlegar
2013-14	W, 4–3, Summerland	L, 1–4, Osoyoos	—	—
2014-15	Did not qualify			
2015-16	L, 0–4, Osoyoos	—	—	—
2016-17	L, 0–4, Osoyoos	—	—	—
2017-18	Did not qualify			
2018-19	Did not qualify			
2019-20	L, 1–4, Kelowna	—	—	—
2020-21	Playoffs cancelled due to coronavirus pandemic			
2021-22	Did not qualify			
2022-23	W, 4–1, Osoyoos	L, 1-4, Princeton	—	—
2023-24	W, 4–0, Osoyoos	L, 3-4, Princeton	—	—
Quesnel River Rush
2024-25	L, 0–4, Kamloops	—	—	—

== Sources ==
- McMillan, Rob (26 January 2024). "LETTER: Junior hockey dream for Quesnel possibly dashed by local gov". Quesnel Cariboo Observer. Black Press Media. Archived from the original on 17 September 2024.
- Peebles, Frank (29 January 2024). "LETTER: Quesnel Kangaroos support idea of Junior hockey, but only if paid $100k". Quesnel Cariboo Observer. Black Press Media. Archived from the original on 10 September 2024.
- Henderson, George (29 January 2024). "Quesnel Kangaroos clear the air over junior hockey proposal". My Cariboo Now. Archived from the original on 31 January 2024.
- Peebles, Frank (31 January 2024). "Financial guarantee is a shot way wide of the Quesnel net: KIJHL". Quesnel Cariboo Observer. Black Press Media. Archived from the original on 3 February 2024.
- Henderson, George (13 February 2024). "Quesnel is one step closer to getting a junior hockey team". My Cariboo Now. Archived from the original on 15 February 2024.
- Kelly, Austin (8 October 2024). "Quesnel Kangaroos take massive win at home opener". Quesnel Cariboo Observer. Black Press Media. Archived from the original on 9 October 2024.
