= Creston Valley Thunder =

Canadian junior ice hockey team

- City: Creston, British Columbia
- League: WIJHL
- Founded: 1992
- Home arena: Johnny Bucyk Arena
- Colours
- General manager: Larry Wintoneak
- Head coach: Larry Wintoneak
- Website: crestonvalleythunder.com

Franchise history
- Since 2026: Creston Valley Thunder

Previous franchise history
- 2000–2026: Creston Valley Thunder Cats (KIJHL)
- 1992–1999: Creston Thunder (RMJHL)

The Creston Valley Thunder are a junior ice hockey franchise and founding member of the Western International Junior Hockey League (WIJHL) based in Creston, British Columbia. The team plays its home games at the Johnny Bucyk Arena.

== History ==
=== 1992–1999: Creston Thunder (RMJHL) ===
The Creston Thunder were founded in 1992 as a Junior 'A' team in the Rocky Mountain Junior Hockey League. By the 1998–99 season, the RMJHL had fallen to four teams and was playing a lot of interleague with the America West Hockey League. The Creston Thunder could not afford the travel and opted to leave the RMJHL, effectively forcing the league to fold, at the end of the 1999 playoffs. The team sat out for the 1999–2000 season to reorganize. Prior to the 2000–01 season, the team was renamed the Creston Valley Thunder Cats and joined the Kootenay International Junior Hockey League.

Statistics
Season	GP	W	L	T	OTL	SOL	Pts	Regular season	Postseason
1993–94	52	25	26	0	0	1	51	3rd in division 6th overall	Lost quarterfinal against Cranbrook (4:1)
1994–95	50	25	24	1	0	0	53	4th in division 4th overall	Lost semifinal against Cranbrook (4:0)
1995–96	58	19	33	0	6	0	40	5th in division 9th overall	Did not qualify
1996–97	60	28	27	0	5	0	61	5th overall	Lost quarterfinal against Nelson (4:3)
1997–98	54	11	40	0	0	3	25	6th overall	Did not qualify
1998–99	45	16	26	0	3	0	35	4th overall	Lost semifinal against Kimberley (4:0)

Source: "Creston Valley Thunder statistics and history". hockeydb.com.

=== 2000–2026: Creston Valley Thunder Cats (KIJHL) ===
In the 2007–2008 season, Joe Martin and Mike Young were hired as co-coaches, with Joe Martin becoming the head coach and general manager at the start of the 2008–2009 season. At the end of the 2010–2011 season Joe Martin moved on to the Merritt Centennials of the BCHL as an assistant coach. The start of the 2011–2012 season seen former Castlegar Rebels Head Coach Brent Heaven take over the head coach / general manager role. The team played a strong competitive season, but lost in the divisional semi-finals against the Kimberly Dynamiters. At the end of the season, Brent assumed the role of assistant coach of the Trail Smoke Eaters in the BCHL.

The Creston Valley Thunder Cats hired newcomer coach Josh Hepditch upon his retirement of semi-pro hockey. Although the Thunder Cats played a high tempo competitive brand of hockey during the 2012–2013 season, the team fell short of making the playoffs. With Josh Hepditch returning for a second season, the Creston Valley Thunder Cats brought an exciting line up of new and returning players that finished first in the Eddie Mountain Division with 80 points, and setting a team record of 39 wins during the campaign. In the first round, the Creston Valley Thunder Cats disposed of the Columbia Valley Rockies in 4 straight games, to meet the Kimberly Dynamiters in the second round. In game seven, the Thunder Cats made up a three-goal deficit in the third period and take the lead with less than 2 minutes in the third in front of a sell out crowd at the Johnny Bucyk Arena. However, the Thunder Cats only won the first game of the Conference finals to lose to the eventual KIJHL Champions Beaver Valley Night Hawks.

With a successful year in the 2013–2014 season, including winning the KIJHL Coach of the Year, Josh Hepditch moved onto the head coach / general manager of the Amherst Wranglers, a Junior A team in the MHL. For the third time in four years, the Thunder Cats were looking for a head coach and general manager, bringing in Jeff Dubois, former head coach / general manager of the Selkirk Saints of the BC Intercollegiate Hockey League. Jeff Dubois had built coach the Selkirk Saints to two back to back championships bringing solid coaching credentials to his new role in as a head coach of the Thunder Cats. In his first two seasons, the teams made the playoffs, losing to the eventual KIJHL Champions the Kimberly Dynamiters in the first round in 2014-2015, and then again to the Kimberly Dynamiters in the second round. Kimberly Dynamiters played in the KIJHL finals, losing to the 100 Mile House Wranglers in the 2015–2016 championship round.

The Creston Valley Thunder Cats organization put together a bid to BC Amateur Hockey in the spring of 2016 to host the Cyclone Taylor Cup, the Provincial Championship for Junior B hockey in British Columbia. The present format of the tournament has the league champions of the Pacific Junior Hockey League (PJHL), the Vancouver Island Junior Hockey League (VIJHL), the Kootenay International Junior Hockey League (KIJHL) and the host team play a round robin format to determine placement in the gold and bronze medal games. In May 2016, BC Amateur Hockey announced that the successful bid for hosting the 2017 Cyclone Taylor Cup was to the Creston Valley, making it the first time the Provincial Championship tournament is played in Creston. The tournament was played April 6 to April 9, 2017. The Thunder Cats finished as bronze medalists in the tournament.

In 2022, the club was fined and placed on probation following an investigation into allegations of hazing.

Statistics
Season	GP	W	L	OTL	SOL	Pts	Regular season	Postseason
2000–01	58	11	41	5	1	28	6th in division	Did not qualify
2001–02	50	16	25	4	5	41	3rd in division	Lost quarterfinal against Kimberley (4:3)
2002–03	50	23	22	1	4	51	3rd in division	Lost quarterfinal against Kimberley (4:3)
2003–04	50	19	28	1	2	41	3rd in division	Lost quarterfinal against Kimberley (4:1)
2004–05	50	21	25	4	0	46	3rd in division	Lost quarterfinal against Columbia Valley (4:2)
2005–06	50	7	43	0	0	14	5th in division	Did not qualify
2006–07	52	25	25	0	2	52	2nd in division	Lost semifinal against Fernie (4:0)
2007–08	52	28	19	0	5	61	2nd in division	Lost quarterfinal against Kimberley (3:1)
2008–09	52	30	12	0	10	70	1st in division	Lost quarterfinal against Kimberley (4:1)
2009–10	50	28	18	0	4	60	2nd in division	Lost semifinal against Fernie (4:0)
2010–11	50	26	19	3	2	57	2nd in division	Lost semifinal against Fernie (4:3)
2011–12	52	30	17	0	5	65	3rd in division	Lost quarterfinal against Kimberley (4:2)
2012–13	52	17	28	0	7	41	5th in division	Did not qualify
2013–14	52	39	11	1	1	80	1st in division	Lost semifinal against Beaver Valley (4:1)
2014–15	52	28	18	1	5	62	3rd in division	Lost quarterfinal against Kimberley (4:1)
2015–16	52	33	15	2	2	70	2nd in division	Lost semifinal against Kimberley (4:0)
2016–17	47	36	9	1	1	74	1st in division 3rd overall	Lost semifinal against Kimberley (4:2)
2017–18	47	32	12	0	1	78	2nd in division 5th overall	Lost quarterfinal against Columbia Valley (4:2)
2018–19	49	10	35	0	4	24	5th in division 20th overall	Did not qualify
2019–20	49	22	20	1	6	51	4th in division 11th overall	Lost quarterfinal against Kimberley (4:1)
2020–21	3	0	3	0	0	0	Season cancelled	
2021–22	42	19	23	1	0	39	3rd in division 12th overall	Lost quarterfinal against Beaver Valley (4:1)
2022–23	44	19	23	1	1	40	5th in division 14th overall	Lost quarterfinal against Grand Forks (4:1)
2023–24	44	21	18	4	1	47	4th in division 11th overall	Lost quarterfinal against Fernie (4:1)
2024–25	44	16	24	4	0	36	4th in division 17th overall	Lost quarterfinal against Kimberley (4:2)
2025–26	44	21	18	0	5	47	4th in division 11th overall	Did not qualify

Source: "KIJHL standings". kijhl.ca.

=== Western International Junior Hockey League ===
In 2026, the club was rebranded as the Creston Valley Thunder following a public consultation. The new name, which received 392 out of the 677 total votes, was a callback to the former RMJHL franchise, the "Creston Thunder". The organization hired a graphic designer to develop a new logo, featuring the team name with a mountain backdrop. The The new team jersey colours were black, gold and white.

The Thundercats, along with 100 Mile House Wranglers, Castlegar Rebels, Chase Heat, Golden Rockets, Kelowna Chiefs, Sicamous Eagles and Spokane Braves, withdrew from the KIJHL to form the independently-sanctioned Western International Junior Hockey League (WIJHL).

== Awards and trophies ==
Coach of the Year

- Rob Boyd: 2003-04 (Divisional)
- Shane Lukinchuk: 2006-07 (Divisional)
- Joe Martin: 2010-11 (Divisional)
- Josh Hepditch: 2013-14 (Divisional and League)
- Jeff Dubois: 2016-17 (Divisional and League)
- Brad Tobin: 2017-18 (Divisional)

Most Sportsmanlike

- Keven Cann: 2009-10 (Divisional)
- Jesse Collins: 2013-14 (Divisional)
- Carson Cartwright: 2014-15 (Divisional)
- Carson Cartwright: 2015-16 (Divisional and League)
- Sebastian Kilcommons: 2016-17 (Divisional)

Most Valuable Player

- Wade Waters: 2007-08 (Divisional)
- Cole Yurkowski: 2008-09
- Jesse Collins: 2011-12 (Divisional)
- Trevor Hanna: 2013-14 (Divisional)
- Sebastian Kilcommons: 2016-17 (Divisional)

Rookie of the Year

- Chris Kostiuk: 2001-02 (Divisional)
- Andrew Wasmuth: 2003-04 (Divisional)
- Trevor Forward: 2011-12 (Divisional)
- Logan Styler: 2013-14 (Divisional)

Top Defenseman

- Colton Grolla: 2008-09
- Sebastian Kilcommons: 2016-17 (Divisional)

Top Goaltender

- James Patterson: 2004-05 (Divisional)
- Wade Waters: 2007-08 (Divisional)
- Kyle Michalovsky: 2013-14 (Divisional and League)
- Brock Lefebvre: 2016-17 (Divisional)

Top Scorer

- Darryl Adams: 2001-02 (Divisional)
- Aaron Jakubec: 2003-04 (Divisional)
- Cole Yurkowski: 2008-09
- Jesse Collins: 2013-14 (Divisional)
- Paxton Malone: 2016-17 (Divisional)

== See also ==
- Creston Clippers
