= Golden Rockets =

Canadian junior ice hockey team

- City: Golden, British Columbia
- League: Kootenay International Junior Hockey League
- Conference: Kootenay
- Division: Eddie Mountain
- Founded: 1991–92
- Home arena: Golden Arena
- Colours: Red, Yellow, Black and White
- President: Lucille Hayward
- General manager: Jared Houseman
- Head coach: Jared Houseman
- Captain: Evan Tsadilas
- Website: goldenrockets.com

Franchise history
- 1991–2005: Golden Rockets
- 2005–2006: Golden Xtreme
- 2006–2008: Golden Jets
- 2008–present: Golden Rockets

The Golden Rockets are a Junior 'A' ice hockey team based in Golden, British Columbia, Canada. They are members of the Eddie Mountain Division of the Kootenay Conference of the Kootenay International Junior Hockey League (KIJHL). They play their home games at Golden Arena, nicknamed the "Plywood Palace". Lucille Hayward is the team's President, Jared Houseman is the General Manager and Head Coach.

The Rockets joined the league in 1991 as an expansion team. In its KIJHL history, the team has won one division playoff title as a member of the Eddie Mountain Division from 1996–2013.

== History ==
=== First Rockets era ===
The Golden Rockets joined the KIJHL in 1991 as an expansion franchise, and finished their debut season with a record of 14–23–1, third in the East Division. They struggled greatly again the following season, with a record of 12–30–0, but finished second in their division due to the three-team division, and the struggles of the Elk Valley Raiders. The following seasons, the Rockets gradually dropped further in the standings as the East Division expanded, finishing third in 1993–94, fourth in 1994–95, and fifth in 1995–96. The following season, the Rockets improved greatly, finishing second in the newly renamed Eddie Mountain Division, with a record of 22–18–1, behind only the Columbia Valley Rockies. The following season, the Rockets dropped to third, with a record of 26-24-0, behind Columbia Valley and the Revelstoke Grizzlies. In 1998–99, the Rockets would finish last in the Eddie Mountain Division, and third last in the league, ahead of only the Spokane Braves and Grand Forks Border Bruins overall. Their form dropped further in 1999–00, finishing with a record of 9–35–2, last in the Eddie Mountain Division. The following year the Rockets struggled again, missing the playoffs for a third consecutive year. In 2001–02, however, the Rockets qualified for the playoffs due to the fact that every team in the Eddie Mountain Division made the playoffs that season, and lost 4–0 to the Rockies in the first round. They struggled again the following season, finishing in last place, and lost 4–3 to Columbia Valley in the first round of the playoffs. They did not qualify for the playoffs for the next two seasons, with a combined record of 25–70–3–2 over that time. For the 2005-06 season, the Rockets changed their name to the Golden Xtreme.

=== Xtreme, Jets, and Rockets ===
The newly renamed Golden Xtreme qualified ended a two-year playoff drought in 2005–06, but fell in the first round to the Fernie Ghostriders, 4–3. The following year, the team was bought by a group headed by National Hockey League legend Bobby Hull and renamed the Golden Jets in honour of Hull's nickname. They missed the playoffs, however, and in 2007-08 the team was re-bought by a community organization and the name reverted to the original Rockets. The team would finish with a record of 13–36–3, missing the playoffs again. In 2008–09, the team would improve to third in the Eddie Mountain Division, finishing with a record of 30–16–6, but lost to Fernie again in the first round. The following season was similar, with the Rockets finishing fourth in their division, before losing to the Ghostriders again. In 2010–11, the Rockets would finish third in their division, before losing to the Creston Valley Thunder Cats in the first round. In this season, Rockets player Joshua MacDonald recorded 78 points in 47 games, a team record still standing. In 2011-12, the Rockets would again lose in the first round, to Fernie for the third time in four years. However, in 2012–13, the Rockets would reach the Conference final, defeating the Kimberley Dynamiters and Fernie Ghostriders en route, before losing to the Castlegar Rebels. However, they failed outright to make the playoffs in 2013–14, winning only 15 games. They returned to the playoffs the following year, but lost handily in the first round to Fernie again. In 2015–16, the Golden Rockets recorded their worst season on record, finishing with a record of 5–43–1–3, failing again to make the playoffs.

After winning a combined 13 games between 2015-2018, the Rockets made a return to the playoffs in 2018-19, where they would face the Kimberley Dynamiters in the first round. The reigning champion Dynamiters would eliminate the Rockets in the playoffs, advancing to the KIJHL Finals before finally falling to the Revelstoke Grizzlies. Despite the disappointing end, the 2018-19 season was one of the team's most successful seasons in the past decade, and the 38-point turnaround was the biggest year-over-year improvement in the KIJHL that season.

== Season-by-season record ==
Note: GP = Games played, W = Wins, L = Losses, T = Ties, OTL = Overtime Losses, Pts = Points, GF = Goals for, GA = Goals against

Records as of February 17, 2024.

Season Results from 1991 to 2008 - GOLDEN Rockets-Xtreme-Jets
Season	GP	W	L	T	OTL	Pts	GF	GA	Finish	Playoffs
GOLDEN ROCKETS
1991-92	38	14	23	1	—	29	223	296	3rd, East	
1992-93	42	12	30	0	—	24	191	277	2nd, East	
1993-94	40	22	18	0	―	44	229	218	3rd, East	Lost in Division Semifinals, 3-4 (Rockies)
1994-95	44	15	26	―	3	33	189	234	4th, East	
1995-96	42	10	32	0	―	20	178	297	5th, East	
1996-97	41	22	18	1	―	45	215	183	2nd, Eddie Mountain	
1997-98	50	26	24	0	―	52	247	250	3rd, Eddie Mountain	
1998-99	52	17	34	1	―	35	154	228	5th, Eddie Mountain	
1999-00	46	9	35	2	―	20	156	223	5th, Eddie Mountain	
2000-01	54	14	37	0	3	31	172	298	5th, Eddie Mountain	Did not qualify
2001-02	50	10	32	5	3	28	148	248	4th, Eddie Mountain	Lost in Division Semifinals, 0-4 (Rockies)
2002-03	50	13	33	3	1	30	144	231	4th, Eddie Mountain	Lost in Division Semifinals, 3-4 (Rockies)
2003-04	50	10	38	1	1	22	162	286	4th, Eddie Mountain	Did not qualify
2004-05	50	15	32	2	1	33	157	210	5th, Eddie Mountain	Did not qualify
GOLDEN XTREME
2005–06	50	24	22	3	1	52	173	189	4th, Eddie Mountain	Lost in Division Semifinals, 3-4 (Ghostriders)
GOLDEN JETS
2006–07	52	13	36	—	3	29	143	257	5th, Eddie Mountain	Did not qualify
2007–08	52	13	36	—	3	29	128	254	4th, Eddie Mountain: East	Did not qualify

Season Results from 2008 return to current season

Note: GP = Games played, W = Wins, L = Losses, OTL = Overtime Losses, SOL = Shootout Losses, D = Defaults, Pts = Points, GF = Goals for, GA = Goals against

Records as of March 3, 2024

Season	GP	W	L	OTL	SOL	Pts	GF	GA	Finish	Playoffs
GOLDEN ROCKETS
2008–09	52	30	16	—	6	66	166	163	3rd, Eddie Mountain	Lost in Division Semifinals, 1-4 (Ghostriders)
2009–10	50	28	22	0	0	56	152	161	4th, Eddie Mountain	Lost in Division Semifinals, 0–4 (Ghostriders)
2010-11	50	22	26	0	2	46	221	233	3rd, Eddie Mountain	Lost in Division Semifinals, 2-4 (Thunder Cats)
2011–12	52	21	25	1	5	48	176	186	4th, Eddie Mountain	Lost in Division Semifinals, 0-4 (Ghostriders)
2012–13	52	31	14	1	6	69	204	176	2nd, Eddie Mountain	Lost in Conference Finals, 0-4 (Rebels)
2013–14	52	15	32	1	4	35	150	218	5th, Eddie Mountain	Did not qualify
2014–15	52	23	24	0	5	51	173	205	4th, Eddie Mountain	Lost Division Semifinals, 1-4 (Ghostriders)
2015–16	52	5	43	1	3	14	106	269	5th, Eddie Mountain	Did not qualify
2016–17	47	5	37	1	4	15	75	208	5 of 5, Eddie Mountain; 20 of 20 KIJHL	Did not qualify
2017–18	47	3	40	1	3	10	85	269	5 of 5, Eddie Mountain; 20 of 20 KIJHL	Did not qualify
2018–19	49	22	23	2	2	48	152	175	4 of 5, Eddie Mountain; 10 of 20 KIJHL	Lost Division Semifinals, 0-4 (Dynamiters)
2019–20	49	20	26	2	1	43	173	186	5th of 5, Eddie Mountain; 10 of 20 KIJHL	Did not qualify
2020–21	2	0	2	0	0	6	16	6	Remaining season cancelled due to COVID-19	
2021–22	42	13	26	0	3	26	109	169	4th of 4, Eddie Mountain; 16th of 19 KIJHL	Lost Division Semifinals, 0-4 (Dynamiters)
2022-23	44	25	16	-	3	53	175	168	3rd, Eddie Mountain	Lost Division Semifinals, 1-4 (Dynamiters)
2023–24	44	11	32	1	0	23	133	247	5th of 5, Eddie Mountain; 20th of 20 KIJHL	Did not qualify
2024–25	44	11	22	7	4	33	119	170	5th of 5, Eddie Mountain; 9th of 10, Kootenay Conf; 19th of 21 KIJHL	Did not qualify
2025–26	44	23	18	3	0	49	152	172	3rd of 5, Eddie Mountain; 5th of 10, Kootenay Conf; 11th of 21 KIJHL	Lost Division Semifinals, 2-4 (Ghostriders)
Moving to Independent Western International Junior Hockey League

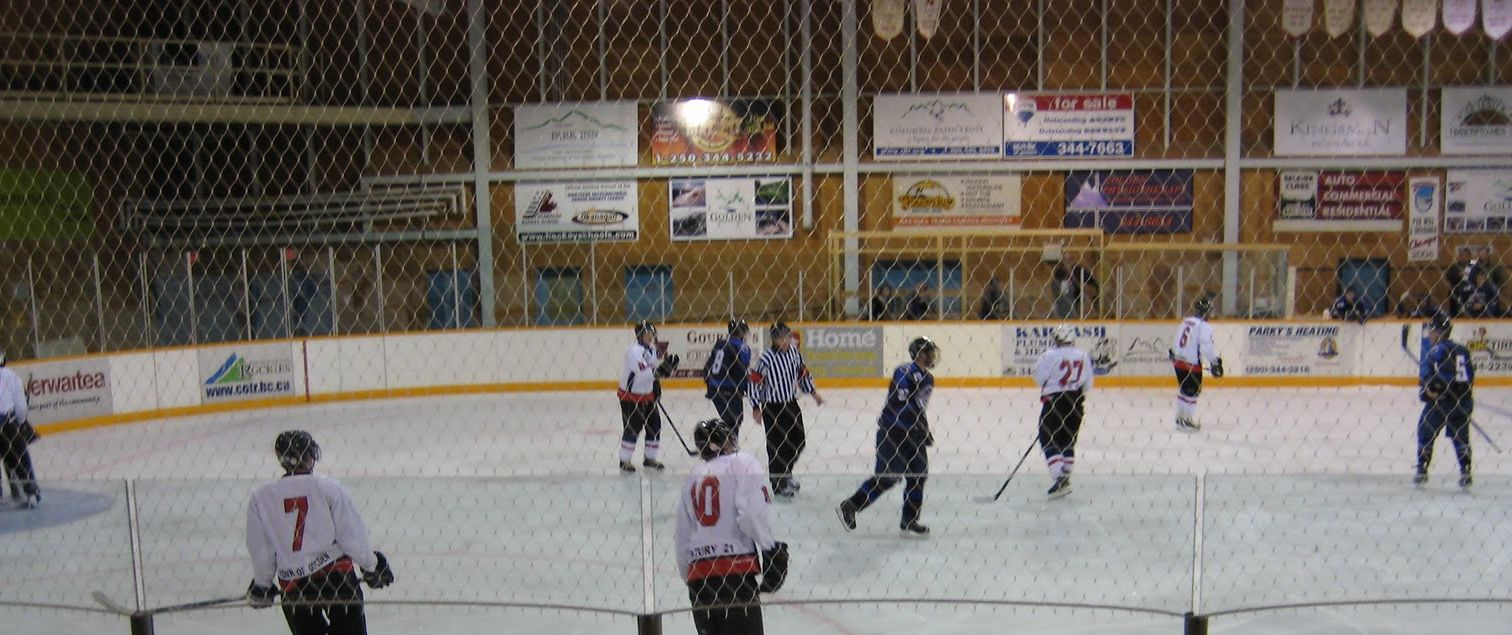
Golden Rockets playing in 2010

=== Playoffs ===
Records as of February 17, 2024.

Golden Xtreme Logo

Season	1st Round	2nd Round	3rd Round	Finals
2000–01	Did not qualify			
2001–02	L, 0-4, Columbia Valley	―	―	―
2002–03	L, 3-4, Columbia Valley	―	―	―
2003–04	Did not qualify			
2004–05	Did not qualify			
2005–06	L, 3-4, Fernie	―	―	―
2006–07	Did not qualify			
2007–08	Did not qualify			
2008–09	L, 1-4, Fernie	—	—	―
2009–10	L, 0-4, Fernie	―	―	―
2010-11	L, 2-4, Creston Valley	—	—	—
2011-12	L, 0-4, Fernie	—	—	—
2012-13	W, 4-0, Kimberley	W, 4-2, Fernie	L, 0-4, Castlegar	—
2013–14	Did not qualify			
2014-15	L, 1-4, Fernie	—	—	—
2015–16	Did not qualify			
2016–17	Did not qualify			
2017–18	Did not qualify			
2018-19	L, 0-4, Kimberley	—	—	—
2019-20	Did not qualify			
2020-21	Playoffs cancelled due to coronavirus pandemic			
2021-22	L, 0-4, Kimberley	—	—	—
2022-23	L, 1-4, Kimberley	—	—	—
2023-24	Did not qualify			
2024-25	Did not qualify			

== Alumni ==
» Paul Armstrong, Prince George Cougars, WHL » Zachary Baba, Nipiwan MJHL » Hans Benson, Nipiwan, MJHL » Trevor Bose, Lebret Eagles, SJHL » Trent Brandvold, Quesnel Millionaires, BCJHL » Chad Cammock, Tri-City Americans, WHL » Darcie Cassie, Senior AAA » Travis Cech, Humboldt Bruins, SJHL » Rohn Christenson, Kimberley Dynamiters, RMJHL » Brandon Cox, Langley BCJHL » Jeremy Chadsey, Quesnel, BCJHL » Lee Dionne, Prince George Spruce Kings RMJHL » Jora Dhami, Douglas College, BCIT » Brad Essex, Merritt Centennials, BCJHL, Peoria ECHL » Mike Fischl, Cranbrook Colts, Mount Royal College, ACAC » Wade Fournier, Williams Lake Mustangs, RMJHL, Louisiana East Coast League » Ryan Ferguson, Kimberley Dynamiters, RMJHL » Alex Greenlay, Williams Lake BCJHL, Trail Smoke Eaters BCJHL » Mike Gratton, Andover, Massachusetts, AHA » Ryan Gillen, Surrey Eagles BCJHL, Prince George Cougars WHL » Jeff Hart, University of Alaska, NCAA » Trevor Hawrys, Kimberly Dynamiters, RMJHL, SAIT » Travis Herlein, Selkirk College, BCIT » Jamie Holden, Merritt Centennials, BCJHL » Darren Ibbottson, Cranbrook Colts RMJHL » Jesse Kallechy, Edmonton Oil Barons, AJHL » Brad Kennedy, Chicago Wolves, ECHL » Brant Kersey, Estevan Bruins, SJHL » Kevin Kotyluk, Nanaimo Clippers BCJHL, Univ of Massachusetts, NCAA » Pierre Landry, Bow Valley, AJHL » Kevin Lapp, Creston RMJHL, Kelowna Rockets, WHL » Mike Lalonde, Prince George Cougars BCJHL, Michigan State University, NCAA » Pat Martel, Senor A New Brunswick » Jarrett Moon, Cranbrook Colts RMJHL » Marshal Macklin, Langley Chiefs BCJHL » Joshua MacDonald, Williams Lake BCJHL » Chris Morseth, Creston Thunder RMJHL » Ryan Minnabarriet, Vernon Vipers, BCJHL » Tyler Moore, Brockville Braves, CJHL » Jesse McLean, Prince George Cougars, WHL » Nic Noseworthy, Dryden Ice Dogs, SIJHL » Adam Nanson, Kimberley Dynamiters, RMJHL » Brian Ouellet, Kimberley Dynamiters, RMJHL » Spencer Pommells, St Albert Steel, AJHL » Chris Pont, University of Alaska, NCAA, Fresno Falcons ECHL » Brent Pockett, Merritt Centennials BCJHL, Quesnel Millionaires BCJHL » Jason Piepmann, Kimberley RMJHL, Bellingham Ice Hawks BCJHL, Mount Royal College, ACAC » Andy Pufal, DEL » Ryan Philpotts, Quesnel Millionaires RMJHL » Craig Roessell, Mount Royal College, ACAC » Matt Ringheim, Estevan Bruins, SJHL » Caleb Roy, Vernon Vipers BCJHL » Greg Saby, Boise Idaho Steelheads, WCL » Darryl Sanford, Williams Lake Mustangs RMJHL, ECHL » Rob Sandrock, Seattle Thunderbirds, WHL » Ryan Schnitzler, DEL » Craig Tressierra, Quesnel Millionaires, BCJHL » Charlie Thermainus, Halifax, MHL » Jade Triebwasser, Canadian Forces St Jean RMC Quebec Drew Whyte, La Ronge Ice Wolves SJHL, Briercrest Clippers ACAC » Tanner Watt, Dryden Ice Dogs, SIJHL » Spencer Wong, Selkirk College, BCIT
