= Williams Lake Mustangs =

Canadian junior ice hockey club

- City: Williams Lake, British Columbia
- League: BCHC
- Division: Interior
- Founded: 2011
- Home arena: Cariboo Memorial Recreation Centre
- Colours: Blue; Grey
- General manager: Tyrel Lucas
- Head coach: Tyrel Lucas
- Website: wlmustangs.ca

Franchise history
- 2011–2024: Summerland Steam
- Since 2024: Williams Lake Mustangs

Previous franchise history
- 2011–2026: KIJHL
- Since 2026: BCHC

The Williams Lake Mustangs are a Junior 'A' ice hockey team based in Williams Lake, British Columbia. They are set to compete in the Interior Division in the British Columbia Hockey Conference (BCHC) beginning in the 2026–27 season after playing in the Kootenay International Junior Hockey League (KIJHL). The team relocated to Williams Lake in 2024 from Summerland where they played as the Summerland Steam from 2011 to 2024.

== History ==
The Summerland Steam debuted as an expansion team in the 2011–12 season of the KIJHL. The town of Summerland previously had a franchise in the KIJHL, called the Summerland Sting, which relocated to Penticton for the 2009-10 KIJHL season, only two seasons before the Steam were founded. In the 1980s, the town was home to the Summerland Buckaroos, a Junior A team in the British Columbia Hockey League. The Buckaroos only lasted five seasons due to continuous losing records. The team had its best post-season run in following the 2015-16 season, winning their division before being defeated by the 100 Mile House Wranglers in the league semi-finals.

The team relocated to Williams Lake in March 2024 and was renamed the Williams Lake Mustangs.

On April 20, 2026, the Mustangs were named as one of 22 teams joining the BCHC, leaving the KIJHL with the remaining 12 teams.

== Season-by-season record ==
=== Summerland Steam ===
Note: GP = Games played, W = Wins, L = Losses, T = Ties, OTL = Overtime Losses, PTS = Points, GF = Goals for, GA = Goals against

Season	GP	W	L	T	OTL	PTS	GF	GA	Finish	Playoffs
2011-12	52	15	35	0	2	32	197	300	5th of 5, Okanagan; 17th of 20, KIJHL	Did not qualify
2012-13	52	21	28	1	2	45	163	202	4th of 5, Okanagan; 14th of 20, KIJHL	Lost Div Semifinals, 2-4 (Chiefs)
2013-14	52	33	15	1	3	70	208	152	1st of 5, Okanagan; 5th of 20, KIJHL	Lost Div Semifinals, 2-4 (Knights)
2014-15	52	28	19	2	3	61	167	141	2nd of 5, Bill Ohlhausen; 8th of 20, KIJHL	Won Div. Semifinal, 4-3 (Chiefs); Lost Div. Finals,2-4 (Coyotes)
2015-16	52	34	16	0	2	70	173	122	2nd of 5, Bill Ohlhausen; 5th of 20, KIJHL	Won Div. Semifinal, 4-3 (Chiefs); Won Div. Finals, 4-2 (Coyotes); Lost Conf Finals, 1-4 (Wranglers)
2016-17	41	29	8	1	3	62	162	103	2nd of 5, Bill Ohlhausen; 4th of 20, KIJHL	Won Div Semifinal, 4-3 (Chiefs); Lost Div Finals, 0-4 (Coyotes)
2017-18	41	27	16	1	3	58	173	156	3rd of 5, Bill Ohlhausen; 9th of 20, KIJHL	Lost Div Semifinal, 4-3 (Chiefs)
2018-19	49	25	20	2	2	54	166	155	2nd of 5, Bill Ohlhausen; 8th of 20, KIJHL	Won Div Semifinal, 4-1 (Posse); Lost Div Finals, 4-1 (Chiefs)
2019-20	49	22	22	1	4	49	162	174	3rd of 5, Bill Ohlhausen; 12th of 20, KIJHL	Lost Div Semifinal, 4-0 (Posse)
2020–21	3	2	1	0	0	4	9	8	Season cancelled	
2021–22	42	22	16	-	4	48	148	163	3rd in division 9th overall	Won quarterfinal against Kelowna (4:1); Lost semifinal against Osoyoos (4:2)
2022–23	44	14	24	-	6	34	104	165	4th in division 16th overall	Lost quarterfinal against Princeton (4:0)
2023–24	44	9	29	5	1	24	74	199	5th in division 18th overall	Did not qualify
2024–25	44	15	22	3	4	37	156	193	4th in division 16th ooverall	Lost quarterfinal against 100 Mile House (4:2)

== Playoffs ==
=== Summerland Steam ===
Season	Division Semifinals	Division Finals	Conference Finals	KIJHL Championship
2011-12	Did not qualify			
2012-13	L, 2-4, Kelowna	—	—	—
2013-14	L, 2-4, North Okanagan	—	—	—
2014-15	W, 4-3, Kelowna	L, 2-4, Osoyoos	—	—
2015-16	W, 4-2, Kelowna	W, 4-2, Osoyoos	L, 1-4, 100 Mile House	—
2016-17	W, 4-3, Kelowna	L, 0-4, Osoyoos	—	—
2017-18	L, 4-3, Kelowna	—	—	—
2018-19	W, 4-1, Princeton	L, 4-1, Kelowna	—	—
2019-20	L, 4-0, Princeton	—	—	—
2020-21	Playoffs cancelled due to coronavirus			
2021-22	W, 4-1, Kelowna	L, 2-4, Osoyoos	—	—
2022-23	L, 0-4, Princeton	—	—	—
2023-24	Did not qualify			
Williams Lake Mustangs
2024-25	L, 2-4, 100 Mile House	—	—	—

== See also ==
- Kootenay International Junior Hockey League
- List of ice hockey teams in British Columbia
- Summerland Sting
- Williams Lake Mustangs (1978–1996)
