= Columbia Valley Rockies =

Canadian junior ice hockey team

- City: Invermere, British Columbia
- League: KIJHL (1978-2026); BCHC (2026-present)
- Division: Kootenay
- Founded: 1978–79
- Home arena: Eddie Mountain Memorial Arena
- Colours: Navy, Orange and White
- President: Brett Holt
- General manager: Tucker Braund
- Head coach: Tucker Braund
- Captain: Vacant
- Website: rockieshockey.ca

Franchise history
- 1978–2026: Columbia Valley Rockies (KIJHL)
- 2026-present: Columbia Valley Rockies (BCHC)

The Columbia Valley Rockies are a Junior 'A' ice hockey team based in Invermere, British Columbia, Canada. They are set to compete in the Kootenay Division in the British Columbia Hockey Conference (BCHC) beginning in the 2026–27 season after playing in the Kootenay International Junior Hockey League (KIJHL). They play their home games at Eddie Mountain Memorial Arena.

The Rockies joined the league in 1978 as an expansion team. In its KIJHL history, the team has won the Keystone Cup twice, in 1989 and 1990; the Cyclone Taylor Cup once, in 1989. The Rockies have won the KIJHL Championship three times, in 1988, 1989 and 1990. They won five division playoff titles as a member of the Eastern Division from 1978-1996 and three division playoff titles as a member of the Eddie Mountain Division from 1996-2012.

== History ==
The team was founded by Eddie Mountain, of whom a KIJHL division was recently named. The team won three straight KIJHL Championships in the late 1980s and in 1989 took home the Cyclone Taylor Cup and the Keystone Cup under the direction of Tom Renney, who is currently an assistant coach of the Detroit Red Wings of the NHL.

On April 20, 2026, the Rockies were named as one of 22 teams joining the BCHC, leaving the KIJHL with the remaining 12 teams.

== Season-by-season record ==
Note: GP = Games played, W = Wins, L = Losses, T = Ties, OTL = Overtime Losses, Pts = Points, GF = Goals for, GA = Goals against

Records as of February 17, 2024.

Season	GP	W	L	T	OTL	Pts	GF	GA	Finish	Playoffs
1978–79	40	18	22	0	―	36	211	246	4th, East	
1979–80	40	18	22	0	―	36	239	250	4th, East	
1980-81	40	19	21	0	―	38	228	236	4th, East	
1981–82	42	25	16	1	―	51	253	224	3rd, East	
1982–83	42	28	13	1	―	57	266	209	2nd, East	
1983-84	42	34	8	0	―	68	298	158	1st, East	
1984-85	42	33	9	0	―	66	309	196	2nd, East	
1985-86	39	23	15	1	―	47	258	233	3rd, East	
1986-87	42	28	14	0	―	56	308	165	3rd, East	
1987-88	42	35	7	0	―	70	315	165	1st, East	KIJHL Champions (Smoke Eaters)
1988-89	44	38	5	1	―	77	341	107	1st, East	KIJHL Champions (Leafs); Cyclone Taylor Cup Champions; Keystone Cup Champions (Tigers)
1989-90	40	35	4	1	―	71	281	120	1st, East	KIJHL Champions (Leafs); Keystone Cup Champions (Bruins)
1990-91	41	35	6	0	―	70	299	120	1st, East	Lost Finals (Smoke Eaters)
1991-92	38	14	22	2	―	30	199	200	2nd, East	
1992-93	42	22	30	0	―	44	256	237	1st, East	Lost Finals (Leafs)
1993-94	40	23	14	3	―	49	239	173	2nd, East	
1994-95	43	27	15	―	1	55	232	209	3rd, East	
1995-96	42	20	22	0	―	40	221	253	4th, East	
1996–97	41	23	17	1	―	47	198	208	1st, Eddie Mountain	Lost Finals (Nitehawks)
1997–98	50	36	14	0	―	72	265	178	1st, Eddie Mountain	
1998-99	52	22	30	0	―	44	184	210	4th, Eddie Mountain	
1999-00	46	32	13	1	―	65	240	172	1st, Eddie Mountain	
2000-01	54	19	34	1	0	39	193	306	4th, Eddie Mountain	Lost Division Semifinals, 0-4 (Grizzlies)
2001-02	50	29	16	4	1	63	234	208	1st, Eddie Mountain	Lost League Semifinals, 0-3 (Nitehawks)
2002–03	50	27	18	3	2	59	176	168	1st, Eddie Mountain	Lost division finals, 2-4 (Dynamiters)
2003–04	50	32	11	6	1	71	228	164	1st, Eddie Mountain	Lost League Semifinals Round-robin, 1-3
2004–05	50	27	13	4	6	64	194	161	2nd, Eddie Mountain	Lost division finals, 3-4 (Dynamiters)
2005–06	50	26	20	0	4	56	200	174	3rd, Eddie Mountain	Lost Division Semifinals, 2-4 (Dynamiters)
2006–07	52	22	26	―	4	48	194	217	4th, Eddie Mountain	Lost Division Semifinals, 0-4 (Ghostriders)
2007–08	52	15	33	―	4	34	137	187	3rd, Eddie Mountain: East	Lost Division Semifinals, 1-3 (Eagles)
2008–09	52	19	24	―	9	47	178	215	5th, Eddie Mountain	Did not qualify
2009–10	50	4	43	1	2	11	115	354	5th, Eddie Mountain	Did not qualify
2010-11	50	11	35	0	4	26	134	243	5th, Eddie Mountain	Did not qualify
2011–12	52	3	48	0	1	7	119	369	5th, Eddie Mountain	Did not qualify
2012–13	52	21	25	0	6	48	160	202	4th, Eddie Mountain	Lost Division Semifinals, 2-4 (Ghostriders)
2013–14	52	13	28	3	8	37	157	230	4th, Eddie Mountain	Lost div semi-finals, 0-4 (Thunder Cats)
2014–15	52	12	34	0	6	30	142	245	5th, Eddie Mountain	Did not qualify
2015–16	52	30	22	0	0	60	203	183	3rd, Eddie Mountain	Lost div semi-finals, 0-4, (Thunder Cats)
2016–17	47	14	29	0	4	32	139	222	4th, Eddie Mountain	Lost div semi-finals, 0-4, (Thunder Cats)
2017–18	47	19	21	3	4	45	167	188	3rd, Eddie Mountain	Won Div Semifinals, 4-2, (Thunder Cats); Lost Div Final 1-4 (Dynamiters)
2018–19	49	22	21	2	4	50	159	182	3rd, Eddie Mountain	Lost div semi-finals, 0-4, (Ghostriders)
2019–20	49	22	19	2	6	52	165	155	3rd, Eddie Mountain	Won Div Semifinals, 4-0, (Ghostriders); Incomplete Div Final 0-2 (Dynamiters); Playoffs cancelled due to covid-19
2020–21	3	3	0	0	0	6	16	6	Remaining season cancelled due to COVID-19	
2021–22	42	30	9	0	3	63	158	123	3rd, Eddie Mountain	Won Div Semifinals, 4-2, (Ghostriders); Lost Div Final 2-4 (Dynamiters)
2022-23	44	31	9	—	4	66	218	126	1st, Eddie Mountain	Lost div semi-finals, 2-4 (Ghostriders)
2023-24	44	25	14	3	2	55	149	122	3rd, Eddie Mountain	Won div semi-finals, 4-1 (Dynamiters); Lost Div Finals, 2-4 (Ghostriders)
2024-25	44	26	16	2	0	54	187	158	3rd of 5, Eddie Mountain; 5th of 10 Kootenay Conf; 8th of 21 KIJHL	Won div semi-finals, 4-0 (Ghostriders); Lost Div Semifinal 1-4 (Dynamiters)

=== Playoffs ===
Records as of March 16, 2024.

Season	1st round	2nd round	3rd round	Finals
2000–01	L, 0-4, Revelstoke	—	—	—
2001–02	W, 4-0, Golden	W, 4-2, Kimberley	L, 0-3, Beaver Valley	—
2002–03	W, 4-3, Golden	L, 2-4, Kimberley	—	—
2003–04	W, 4-0, Princeton	W, 4-1, Kimberley	L, 1-3, Round-robin (Nitehawks) and (Storm)	—
2004–05	W, 4-2, Creston Valley	L, 3-4, Kimberley	—	—
2005–06	L, 2-4, Kimberley	—	—	—
2006–07	L, 0-4, Fernie	—	—	—
2007–08	L, 1-3, Sicamous	—	—	—
2008–09	Did not qualify			
2009–10	Did not qualify			
2010-11	Did not qualify			
2011-12	Did not qualify			
2012–13	L, 2-4, Fernie	—	—	—
2013-14	L, 0-4, Creston Valley	—	—	—
2014–15	Did not qualify			
2015-16	L, 0-4, Creston Valley	—	—	—
2016-17	L, 0-4, Creston Valley	—	—	—
2017-18	W, 4-2, Creston Valley	L, 1-4, Kimberley	—	—
2018-19	L, 0-4, Fernie	—	—	—
2019-20	0-2, Kimberley	Playoffs cancelled due to coronavirus pandemic		
2020-21	Playoffs cancelled due to coronavirus pandemic			
2021-22	W, 4-2, Fernie	L, 2-4, Kimberley	—	—
2022-23	L, 2-4, Fernie	—	—	—
2023-24	W, 4-1, Kimberley	L, 2-4, Fernie	—	—
2024-25	W, 4-0, Fernie	L, 1-4, Kimberley	—	—

=== Cyclone Taylor Cup ===
Year	Gold Medal Game			Bronze Medal Game		
Year	Champions	Score	Finalists	Third Place	Score	Fourth Place
1989	Columbia Valley Rockies; KIJHL	―	―	―	―	―

=== Keystone Cup ===
Keystone Cup Champions
Year	Champions	Runners-Up	Consolation Champions	Host City
1989	(British Columbia) Columbia Valley Rockies	(Saskatchewan) Kinistino Tigers	(Alberta) Stony Plain Flyers	(Manitoba) Gimli, MB
1990	(British Columbia) Columbia Valley Rockies	(Alberta) Calgary Bruins		(British Columbia) Invermere, BC

== Alumni ==
- Doug Barrault
- Taylor Dakers
- Wade Dubielewicz
- Cory Flett
- Marc Garthe
- Logan Koopmans
- Jeff Lank
- Riley Nelson
- Jason Marshall
- Tom Renney
- Craig Stahl

== Awards and trophies ==
Keystone Cup

- 1988-89
- 1989-90

Cyclone Taylor Cup

- 1988-89

KIJHL Championship

- 1987-88
- 1988-89
- 1989-90

Coach of the Year

- Matt Hughes: 2005-06 (Divisional)

Most Sportsmanlike

- Darryl Mcivor: 2003-04 (Divisional)
- Cody Steele: 2005-06 (Divisional)
- Cody Steele: 2006-07 (Divisional)
- Tyler Nypower: 2017-18 (Divisional)

Most Valuable Player

- Andrew Billinghurst: 2001-02 (Divisional)
- Jason Botterill: 2002-03 (Divisional And League)
- Reid Mitchell:2007-08, 2008-2009 (Team)
- Ryan Skytt: 2016-17 (Team)

Rookie of the Year

- Taylor Dakers: 2002-03 (Divisional)
- Trevor Bailey: 2005-06 (Divisional)
- Josh Antunes/Kale Hawryluk: 2017-18 (Team)

Top Goaltender

- Taylor Dakers: 2002-03 (Divisional)
- Tyler Bilton: 2003-04 (Divisional)

Playoff MVP

- Ben Kelsch/Ryan Skytt: 2017-18 (Team)

Top Scorer

- Rocky Mix: 2002-03 (Divisional)
- Brett Bjorkman: 2007-08 (Divisional)

Heart and Hustle

- Brandt Black/Fraser McMann 2017-18: (Team)

Coaches Choice

- Brennan Nelson 2017-18: (Team)

Most Improved

- Hunter Beckett: 2017-18 (Team)

Community Involvement

- Brandt Black: 2017-18 (Team)

Top Defenceman

- Kale Hawryluk: 2017-18 (Team)

Top Defensive Forward

- Brennan Nelson: 2017-18 (Team)

Top Forward

- Mike Dyck 2016-17: (Team)
