= Osoyoos Coyotes =

Canadian junior ice hockey team

- City: Osoyoos, British Columbia
- League: KIJHL (1996-2026); BCHC (2026-present)
- Division: Interior
- Founded: 2010–11
- Home arena: Osoyoos Sunbowl Arena
- Colours: Sedona Red, Desert Sand and White
- Owner: Randy Bedard
- President: Randy Bedard
- General manager: Jackson Playfair
- Head coach: Jackson Playfair
- Captain: Vacant
- Website: www.osoyooscoyotes.com

Franchise history
- 2010–2026: Osoyoos Coyotes (KIJHL)
- 2026-present: Osoyoos Coyotes (BCHC)

The Osoyoos Coyotes are a Junior 'A' Ice Hockey team based in Osoyoos, British Columbia, Canada. They are set to compete in the Interior Division in the British Columbia Hockey Conference (BCHC) beginning in the 2026–27 season after playing in the Kootenay International Junior Hockey League (KIJHL). They play their home games at Osoyoos Sunbowl Arena.

== History ==
In the 2010–11 season, the Coyotes first in the KIJHL, the team finished with a record of 42–2–2–4 (90 pts.), winning the league's regular season title. In the 2010–11 KIJHL playoffs the Coyotes defeated the Penticton Lakers 4–0 in the Division Semifinals, defeated the Kelowna Chiefs 4–0 in the Division Finals, defeated the Revelstoke Grizzlies 4–2 in the Conference Finals, and in the KIJHL Championship Finals the Coyotes defeated the Castlegar Rebels 4–2. Then the Coyotes went into the 2011 Cyclone Taylor Cup. The following season, the Coyotes finished first in the Okanagan Division again, with a record of 31–18–1–2, but lost in the first round to the Kelowna Chiefs. In 2012–13, the Coyotes finished third in the Okanagan Division, with a record of 28–17–0–7, losing in the third round, the Conference finals, to the North Okanagan Knights. The following season the Coyotes finished third again, with a record of 29–22–0–1, and made it to the Conference final again, losing to the Kamloops Storm. In 2014–15, the Coyotes would finish first in the Okanagan Division for the first time in three years, and defeated Princeton and Summerland in the playoffs, before falling again to the Storm. In 2015–16, the Coyotes won the league's regular season title again, with a record of 41–9–1–1, and defeated the North Okanagan Knights in the first round. But it would all come to an end after they lost to the Summerland Steam in six games.

In 2016–17, the Coyotes won their division, and defeated the Knights again in the first round. They would defeat the Summerland Steam in the second round, and advance to play the Chase Heat. In the series against Chase, the Coyotes won the first two games in the best-of-five series, and led Game 3 (in which a Coyotes win would clinch the series) until Chase player Kolten Moore tied the game with 3 seconds left in the third period, and Chase would win in overtime. The Coyotes then took a 1-goal lead deep into the third period, but suffered a similar fate, as Michael Fidanza tied the game for Chase with only 1 second remaining in the game, and the Heat would again prevail in overtime. The Coyotes would then drop Game 5, losing the series and being eliminated. Chase would lose in a series sweep to the Beaver Valley Nitehawks in the league finals. In 2017–18 the Coyotes won their division for a 4th straight year with a record of 32–11–2–2. They defeated the Princeton Posse in 4 games and the Kelowna Chiefs in 6 games. They ultimately lost to the Revelstoke Grizzlies in 7 games in the conference finals. In 2018–19 the Coyotes had one of the worst seasons in franchise history as they finished 4th in their division with a record of 17–29–2–1 and were swept in the first round by the Kelowna Chiefs. During the season the Coyotes retired Judd Repole's number 18 on October 12, 2018. 2019-20 marked the 10th anniversary of the Coyotes and also the worst season in franchise history with a record of 9–36–1–2 and missed the playoffs for the first time in franchise history. On opening night they brought in former captain Steve Sasniyuk to drop a ceremonial puck. The Coyotes would only play four games in the 2020–21 season where they only won one game and were captained by Andrew Smiley. The rest of the season was postponed due to COVID-19 related issues.

In 2021-22 the Coyotes returned to the ice for the first time in nearly a year. Nathan Hannon was named captain and the team had one of its best seasons in franchise history. The team had 71 points in 42 games as they won the Bill Ohlhaunsen division for the first time in franchise history, (it was previously known as the Okanagan division). They also were awarded the Presidents Cup also for the first time in franchise history, (they were regular season champions in 2010-11 but the trophy was introduced in 2018–19). The playoffs at first saw continued success. The coyotes took an early 2–0 series lead on the Posse and never looked back as they took the series in 5. In the second round the Steam came into town and an upset seemed to be brewing. The Coyotes had beaten them in all eight meetings of the regular season but fell down 3-0 early in game one. But thanks to a spirited effort the team came back and won 4–3 in it. In game two they fell behind again by 3 and scored four straight to take a 5–4 lead but the Steam were able to take it in overtime. The steam took game 3 but the Coyotes fought hard and took games 4 and 5 to take a 3–2 lead in the series. In game 6 Zachary Park would with less the a second left in ot to send Osoyoos to the Conference Finals. But there, it would all come crashing down. An injury to Crae Dawson and suspensions to Nathan Hannon, Kaleb Kremp and Payton McDonald-Corea would put the Coyotes in a hole they would never climb out of. Despite fighting hard the offence just could not get going and the Coyotes were swept aside by Revelstoke.

On April 20, 2026, the Coyotes were named as one of 22 teams joining the BCHC, leaving the KIJHL with the remaining 12 teams.

== Season-by-season record ==
Note: GP = Games played, W = Wins, L = Losses, T = Ties, OTL = Overtime Losses, Pts = Points, GF = Goals for, GA = Goals against

Records as of February 17, 2024.

Season	GP	W	L	T	OTL	Pts	GF	GA	Finish	Playoffs
2010–11	50	42	2	2	4	90	257	110	1st, Okanagan	KIJHL Champions, 4–2 (Rebels)
2011–12	52	31	18	1	2	65	244	172	1st, Okanagan	Lost Division Semifinals, 2–4 (Chiefs)
2012–13	52	28	17	0	7	63	205	193	3rd, Okanagan	Lost Conference Finals, 3–4 (Knights)
2013–14	52	29	22	0	1	59	203	180	3rd, Okanagan	Lost Conference Finals, 3–4 (Storm)
2014–15	52	42	7	2	1	87	239	116	1st, Okanagan	Lost Conference Finals, 1–4 (Storm)
2015–16	52	41	9	1	1	84	224	93	1st, Okanagan	Lost Division Finals, 2–4 (Steam)
2016–17	47	37	8	1	1	76	208	111	1st, Okanagan	Lost Conference Finals, 2–3 (Heat)
2017–18	47	32	11	2	2	68	202	129	1st, Okanagan	Lost Conference Finals, 3–4 (Grizzlies)
2018–19	47	17	29	2	1	37	121	191	4th, Okanagan	Lost Division Semifinals, 0–4 (Chiefs)
2019–20	48	9	36	1	2	21	126	233	5th, Bill Ohlhausen	Did not qualify
2020-21	3	1	2	0	0	2	10	11	Rest of Season cancelled	Playoffs cancelled due to COVID-19
2021-22	42	33	3	0	6	72	210	116	1st, Bill Ohlhausen	Lost Conference Finals, 0-4 (Grizzlies)
2022-23	44	27	13	-	4	58	188	140	2nd, Bill Ohlhausen	Lost Division Semifinals, 1-4 (Knights)
2023–24	44	16	24	0	4	36	121	177	3rd, Bill Ohlhausen	Lost Div. Semifinals, 0–4 (Knights)
2024–25	44	15	26	2	1	33	117	182	6 of 6, Bill Ohlhausen; 10 of 11 O/S Conf; 18 of 21 KIJHL	Did not qualify

=== Playoffs ===
Records as of February 27, 2024.

Season	Division Semifinals	Division Finals	Conference Finals	KIJHL Championship
2010–11	W, 4–0, Penticton	W, 4–0, Kelowna	W, 4–2, Revelstoke	W, 4–2, Castlegar
2011–12	L, 2–4, Kelowna	—	—	—
2012–13	W, 4–1, Princeton	W, 4–2, Kelowna	L, 3–4, North Okanagan	—
2013–14	W, 4–0, Kelowna	W, 4–1, North Okanagan	L, 1–4, Kamloops	—
2014–15	W, 4–1, Princeton	W, 4–2, Summerland	L, 1–4, Kamloops	—
2015–16	W, 4–0, North Okanagan	L, 2–4, Summerland	—	—
2016–17	W, 4–0, North Okanagan	W, 4–0, Summerland	L, 2–3, Chase	—
2017–18	W, 4–0, Princeton	W, 4–2, Kelowna	L, 3–4, Revelstoke	—
2018–19	L, 0–4, Kelowna	—	—	—
2019–20	Did not qualify			
2020-21	Playoffs cancelled due to coronavirus pandemic			
2021-22	W, 4–1, Princeton	W, 4–2, Summerland	L, 0–4, Revelstoke	–
2022-23	L, 1–4, North Okanagan	—	—	—
2023-24	L, 0–4, North Okanagan	—	—	—
2024-25	Did not qualify			

=== Cyclone Taylor Cup ===
Season	Bronze Medal Game	Gold Medal Game
2010–11	W, 3–0, Richmond	—
