= Chase Heat =

Canadian junior ice hockey team

- City: Chase, British Columbia
- League: Kootenay International Junior Hockey League
- Conference: Okanagan/Shuswap
- Division: Doug Birks
- Founded: 2011–12
- Home arena: Art Holding Memorial Arena
- Colours: White, Red and Black
- President: Darryl Adamson
- General manager: Nick Deschenes
- Head coach: Nick Deschenes
- Website: chaseheat.com

Franchise history
- 2007–2010: Chase Chiefs
- 2011–present: Chase Heat

The Chase Heat are a Junior ice hockey team based in Chase, British Columbia, Canada. They are members of the NORTH Division of the Western International Junior Hockey League (WIJHL)

They play their home games at the Art Holding Memorial Arena. Steve Smyth is the team's president, and Kris Joyce is the interim head coach and general manager of the franchise.

The Heat joined the original league in 2011 as an expansion team.

== History ==
The 2011–12 Chase Heat entered their first season as a member of the now defunct Kootenay International Junior Hockey League (KIJHL), as an expansion team. Before the Heat, Chase also had a KIJHL team named the Chase Chiefs, before relocating to Kelowna, British Columbia prior to the 2010–11 KIJHL season to become the Kelowna Chiefs.

The 2016–17 season saw the Heat earn their first Doug Birks Division title. Not only did they win their division in the regular season, but also in the playoffs against the Kamloops Storm. The Heat also claimed the Okanagan/Shuswap Conference title after defeating the Osoyoos Coyotes in a best of 5 series, 3–2. The Heat lost to the eventual KIJHL Champion Beaver Valley Nitehawks in a best of 5 series, 0–3.

The Heat, along with 7 other teams, left the KIJHL of their own accord and formed their own Junior League at the beginning of the 2026-2027 season. The 8 original members of the WIJHL were joined by 2 new franchises in Oliver and Enderby BC . The WIJHL is an independent League, affiliated with the BCHL

== Season-by-season record ==
Note: GP = Games played, W = Wins, L = Losses, T = Ties, OTL = Overtime Losses, Pts = Points, GF = Goals for, GA = Goals against

Records as of February 17, 2024.

| Season | GP | W | L | T | OTL | Pts | GF | GA | Finish | Playoffs |
| 2011–12 | 52 | 5 | 45 | 1 | 1 | 12 | 123 | 319 | 5th, Doug Birks | Did not qualify |
| 2012–13 | 52 | 11 | 35 | 3 | 3 | 28 | 124 | 242 | 5th, Doug Birks | Did not qualify |
| 2013–14 | 52 | 27 | 23 | 0 | 2 | 56 | 198 | 181 | 2nd, Doug Birks | Lost div. semi-finals, 1–4 (Wranglers) |
| 2014–15 | 52 | 25 | 19 | 2 | 6 | 58 | 174 | 172 | 2nd, Doug Birks | Lost div. semi-finals, 2–4 (Wranglers) |
| 2015–16 | 52 | 31 | 16 | 3 | 2 | 67 | 176 | 135 | 3rd, Doug Birks | Lost division finals, 2–4 (Wranglers) |
| 2016–17 | 47 | 31 | 12 | 2 | 2 | 66 | 188 | 131 | 1st of 5 Doug Birks; 3rd of 10 – Conf. 6th of 20 – KIJHL | Lost League Finals, 0–3 (Nitehawks) |
| 2017–18 | 47 | 24 | 18 | 0 | 2 | 54 | 182 | 157 | 2nd of 5 Doug Birks; 6th of 10 – Conf. 11th of 20 – KIJHL | Lost div. semi-finals, 0–4 (Wranglers) |
| 2018–19 | 49 | 14 | 31 | 2 | 2 | 32 | 146 | 218 | 5th of 5 Doug Birks; 10th of 10 – Conf. 18th of 20 – KIJHL | Did not qualify for playoffs |
| 2019–20 | 49 | 30 | 16 | 1 | 2 | 63 | 182 | 139 | 2nd of 5 Doug Birks; 3rd of 10 – Conf. 7th of 20 – KIJHL | Lost div. semi-finals, 1–4 (Wranglers) |
| 2020–21 | 3 | 2 | 0 | 0 | 1 | 3 | 15 | 11 | Remaining season cancelled due to COVID-19 | |
| 2021–22 | 42 | 20 | 15 | 0 | 7 | 47 | 152 | 13 | 3rd of 5 Doug Birks; 6th of 10 – Conf. 10th of 19 – KIJHL | Lost div. semi-finals, 3–4 (Kamloops) |
| 2022–23 | 44 | 10 | 30 | – | 4 | 24 | 93 | 194 | 5th of 5 Doug Birks | Did not qualify for playoffs |
| 2023–24 | 44 | 12 | 29 | 0 | 3 | 27 | 123 | 192 | 4rd of 5 Doug Birks; 8th of 10 – Conf. 16th of 19 – KIJHL | Lost div. semi-finals, 0–4 (Grizzlies) |
| 2024–25 | 44 | 12 | 29 | 2 | 1 | 27 | 112 | 178 | 5th of 5 Doug Birks; 11th of 11 – O/S Conf. 20th of 21 – KIJHstyle="background:#eee;"L | Did not qualify for playoffs |
| 2025–26 | 44 | 14 | 29 | 1 | 0 | 29 | 122 | 219 | 4th of 5 Doug Birks; 8th of 11 – O/S Conf. 17th of 21 – KIJHL | Lost div. semi-finals, 0–4 (Storm) |
Moving to Independent Western International Junior Hockey League

=== Playoffs ===
Records as of February 28, 2024.

| Season | Division Semifinals | Division Finals | Conference Finals | KIJHL Championship |
|---|---|---|---|---|
| 2011–12 | Did not qualify | | | |
| 2012–13 | Did not qualify | | | |
| 2013–14 | L, 1–4, 100 Mile House | ― | ― | ― |
| 2014–15 | L, 2–4, 100 Mile House | ― | ― | ― |
| 2015–16 | W, 4–1, Kamloops | L, 2–4, 100 Mile House | ― | ― |
| 2016–17 | W, 4–1, Revelstoke | W, 4–1, Kamloops | W, 3–2, Osoyoos | L, 0–3 Beaver Valley |
| 2018–19 | Did not qualify | | | |
| 2019–20 | L, 1–4, 100 Mile House | — | — | — |
| 2020–21 | Playoffs cancelled due to coronavirus pandemic | | | |
| 2021–22 | L, 3–4, Kamloops | — | — | — |
| 2022–23 | Did not qualify | | | |
| 2023–24 | L, 0–4, Revelstoke | — | — | — |
| 2024–25 | Did not qualify | | | |
