= 100 Mile House Wranglers =

Junior ice hockey club

- City: 100 Mile House
- League: WIJHL
- Division: North
- Founded: 2001
- Home arena: South Cariboo Rec Centre
- Colours: Navy; Gold
- General manager: Levi Stuart
- Head coach: Levi Stuart
- Website: 100milewranglers.com

Franchise history
- 2001–2009: Summerland Sting
- 2009–2013: Penticton Lakers
- Since 2013: 100 Mile House Wranglers

Championships
- League: 2016
- Provincial: 2016
- Regional: 2016

The 100 Mile House Wranglers are a junior ice hockey club and franchise of the Western International Junior Hockey League (WIJHL). The team plays its home games at the South Cariboo Recreation Centre in 100 Mile House, British Columbia.

== History ==
The Wranglers joined the league in 2013 as a relocated team. The franchise originally started as the Summerland Sting in 2001, then relocated to Penticton as the Penticton Lakers in 2009. The Lakers' short-lived era would come to an end when they relocated prior to the 2013–14 season to 100 Mile House to become the Wranglers. In its short KIJHL history, the team has won the Keystone Cup, the Cyclone Taylor Cup and the KIJHL Championship once, in 2016. They won one division playoff title as a member of the Doug Birks Division from 2013 until 2023 and one conference playoff title as a member of the Okanagan/Shuswap Conference from 2013 to 2023.

=== Summerland Sting ===
The start of the new expansion franchise saw the Sting finish third in the Okanagan Shuswap Division in their first year (2001–02 season) and lost to the Revelstoke Grizzlies, 0–4 in the Division Semifinals. In the Sting's eight-year existence, they never advanced past the second round. Due to poor records and attendance, they were relocated prior to the start of the 2009–10 season to Penticton, to become the Penticton Lakers.

=== Penticton Lakers ===
The newly relocated Lakers finished 6th in the Okanagan Division (2009–10 season) and lost 0–3, to the Sicamous Eagles, in the Division Semifinals. The Lakers failed to advance to the Division Finals (second round) in their three-year existence and were eventually relocated to 100 Mile House, to become the Wranglers, because of poor results and attendance.

=== 100 Mile House Wranglers ===
2013–14 season

The Wranglers finished third in the Doug Birks Division as a new relocated team, consequently making the playoffs in their first year in the KIJHL, facing the second seeded-team in their division, the Chase Heat; whom they defeated 4–1 in the opening round. The Wranglers would go on to be swept in the second round by the Kamloops Storm.

2014–15 season

In the 2014–15 season, the Wranglers finished third in their division again and faced the Chase Heat for the second consecutive time in the Division Semifinals. 100 Mile House would defeat the Heat in six games before losing in the second round to the Kamloops Storm in five games.

2015–16 season

In the 2015–16 season, the Wranglers finished atop the Doug Birks Division and went on to the KIJHL final by way of defeating the Revelstoke Grizzlies, the Chase Heat and the Summerland Steam. Representing the Okanagan/Shuswap Conference, the Wranglers defeated the defending-championship Kimberley Dynamiters in five games.

The Wranglers went on to win the 2016 provincial championship Cyclone Taylor Cup in Victoria, BC. The Wranglers defeated the Victoria Cougars in the gold medal game by a final score of 5:4.

The following week, the Wranglers won the regional championship Keystone Cup, defeating the Saskatoon Quakers by a final score of 3:2 in overtime.

2026–27 season

In 2026, the Wranglers and eight other franchises withdrew from the KIJHL and formed the Western International Junior Hockey League (WIJHL).

Note: GP = Games played, W = Wins, L = Losses, T = Ties, D = Defaults, OTL = Overtime Losses, Pts = Points, GF = Goals for, GA = Goals against

Statistics
Season	GP	W	L	T	OTL	SOL	Pts	GF	GA	Finish	Playoffs
2013–14	52	23	21	0	0	8	54	159	176	3rd, Doug Birks	Lost in Division Finals, 0–4 (Storm)
2014–15	52	26	21	0	0	5	57	157	161	3rd, Doug Birks	Lost in Division Finals, 1–4 (Storm)
2015–16	52	33	12	3	0	4	73	177	125	1st, Doug Birks	KIJHL Champions, 4–1 (Dynamiters); Cyclone Taylor Cup Champions (5–4) (Cougars); Keystone Cup Champions (3–2 OT) (Quakers)
2016–17	47	27	12	3	0	5	62	175	137	2nd, Doug Birks	Lost Division Semifinals, 2–4 (Storm)
2017–18	47	24	18	4	0	1	53	207	179	3rd, Doug Birks	Lost Division Finals, 3–4 (Grizzlies)
2018–19	49	25	19	2	0	3	55	168	141	2nd, Doug Birks	Lost Division Finals, 0–4 (Grizzlies)
2019–20	49	25	20	2	0	2	54	170	163	Cancelled	
2020–21	7	5	2	0	0	0	10	18	12	Cancelled	
2021–22	42	11	29	0	1	1	24	84	176	5th, Doug Birks	Did not qualify
2022–23	44	16	24	-	-	4	36	111	167	4th, Doug Birks	Lost Division Semifinals, 0–4 (Grizzlies)
2023–24	44	11	28	0	2	3	27	105	156	5th, Doug Birks	Did not qualify
2024–25	44	25	15	0	1	3	54	166	149	1st, Doug Birks; 4th of 11 Ok/Shu Conf; 9th of 21 KIJHL	Won Div Semifinal (Mustangs); Won Div Finals 4-2 (Storm); Lost Conf Finals 1-4 (Grizzlies)
2025–26	44	10	26	0	5	3	28	118	179	5th, Doug Birks; 11th of 11 Ok/Shu Conf; 20th of 21 KIJHL	Did not qualify

=== Playoffs ===
Season	Division Semifinals	Division Finals	Conference Finals	Teck Cup
2013–14	W, 4–1, Chase	L, 0–4, Kamloops	—	—
2014–15	W, 4–2, Chase	L, 1–4, Kamloops	—	—
2015–16	W, 4–0, Revelstoke	W, 4–2, Chase	W, 4–1, Summerland	W, 4–1, Kimberley
2016–17	L, 2–4, Kamloops	—	—	—
2017–18	W, 4–0, Chase	L, 3–4, Revelstoke	—	—
2018–19	W, 4–1, Sicamous	L, 0–4, Revelstoke	—	—
2019–20	Cancelled			
2020–21	Cancelled			
2021–22	Did not qualify			
2022–23	L, 0–4, Revelstoke	—	—	—
2023–24	Did not qualify			
2024–25	W, 4–2, Williams Lake	W, 4–2, Kamloops	L, 1–4, Revelstoke	—
2025–26	Did not qualify			

== Provincial championships ==
Cyclone Taylor Cup
Year	Round Robin	Record	Place	Semi; Final	Bronze Medal Game	Gold Medal Game
2016	L, Victoria Cougars 2–4; W, Mission City Outlaws 2–1; W, Campbell River 4–3	2–1–0	2nd of 4	n/a	n/a	W, Victoria Cougars 5–4; CYCLONE TAYLOR CUP Champions

== Regional championships ==
Keystone Cup
Season	Round Robin	Record	Standing	Bronze Medal Game	Gold Medal Game
2016	L, Thunder Bay - Ont 0–3; W, Regina - Sask 8–5; W, Peace River - Alta 4–2; W, Peguis - Man 9–3; L, Saskatoon - Sask 4–6	3–2–0	2nd of 6	North Peace Navigators 5OT; Regina Capitals 4	100 Mile House Wranglers 3 OT; Saskatoon Quakers 2 KEYSTONE CUP Champions

Preceded by Campbell River Storm	Keystone Cup Champions; 2016	Succeeded by Wainwright Bisons
