= Kelowna Chiefs =

Canadian junior ice hockey team

- City: Kelowna, British Columbia
- League: Western International Junior Hockey League
- Division: Southern
- Founded: 2010
- Home arena: Rutland Arena
- Colours: Red, Black and White
- Owner: Darren Tymchyshy
- General manager: Rylan Ferster (2025-26)
- Head coach: Rylan Ferster (2025-26)
- Captain: Vacant
- Website: kelownachiefs.com

Franchise history
- 2007–2010: Chase Chiefs
- 2010–present: Kelowna Chiefs

The Kelowna Chiefs are a Junior 'A' ice hockey team based in Kelowna, British Columbia, Canada. They are members of the Southern Division of the Western International Junior Hockey League (WIJHL). They play their home games at Rutland Arena.

== History ==
=== Chase ===
The Chiefs were founded as the Chase Chiefs in 2007. They did not qualify for the playoffs in their opening season, finishing with a record of 26-20-5. The following year, they finished 25-23-4, qualifying for the playoffs, where they lost in the second round to the Sicamous Eagles. In the 2009-10 season, they finished with a record of 26-20-4, finishing third in the Okanagan Division. They defeated the Kamloops Storm in the opening round, 3-1, before bowing out to Revelstoke in the second. The 2009-10 season marked the end of the Chase Chiefs, however, as the franchise relocated to Rutland, in Kelowna for the 2010-11 season. In three seasons, the Chase Chiefs compiled a total record of 77-63-13. They were last coached by Brad Fox before the relocation. However, the town of Chase was awarded an expansion franchise for the KIJHL in 2011-12, only a year after the departure of the Chiefs. The Chase Heat joined the league along with the Summerland Steam in 2011-12.

=== Kelowna ===
The new Chiefs team played in Kelowna for the 2010-11 season, and finished with a record of 26-21-1-0-2 in their opening season, second in the Okanagan Division. They would lose in the second round of the playoffs, 4-0, to the Osoyoos Coyotes. In their second season, the Chiefs finished with an almost identical record, 26-22-0-0-4, finishing fourth in the Okanagan Division. They surprisingly played all the way to the league championship, before being swept 4-0 by the Beaver Valley Nitehawks. The following year, the Chiefs finished with a record of 35-15-1-0-1, first in the Okanagan Division. They were defeated, however, in the second round of the playoffs by Osoyoos again. In 2013-14, the Chiefs finished 2nd in the Okanagan Division, before losing in the first round to Osoyoos again. The next year, the Chiefs finished with a record of 23-24-2-0-2, 2nd in the Okanagan Division. They lost, however, in the first round again, this time to the Summerland Steam. The 2015-16 season was almost identical, with the Chiefs' compiling a record of 24-23-2-2-1, and losing in the first round again to Summerland.

The Chiefs joined the break-away WIJHL in the 25-26 offseason during the provincial re-alignment of junior hockey. Alongside 9 other teams from the KIJHL, Kelowna went independent and affiliated with the BCHL, whilst the remaining Kootenay teams formed the BC Hockey Conference with the PJHL.

== Season-by-season record ==
Note: GP = Games played, W = Wins, L = Losses, T = Ties, OTL = Overtime Losses, PTS = Points, GF = Goals for, GA = Goals against

Season	GP	W	L	T	OTL	PTS	GF	GA	Finish	Playoffs
2010-11	50	26	21	1	2	55	178	176	2nd of 4, Okanagan; 7th of 18, KIJHL	Lost Div Finals, 0-4 (Coyotes)
2011–12	52	26	22	0	4	56	221	208	4th of 5, Okanagan; 13th of 20, KIJHL	Lost finals, 0-4 (Nitehawks)
2012–13	52	35	15	1	1	72	205	135	1st of 5, Okanagan; 3rd of 20, KIJHL	Lost Div Finals, 2-4 (Coyotes)
2013–14	52	31	17	0	4	66	201	170	2nd of 5, Okanagan; 6th of 20, KIJHL	Lost Div Semifinals, 0-4 (Coyotes)
2014–15	52	23	24	2	2	50	161	173	3rd of 5, Bill Olhausen; 14th of 20, KIJHL	Lost Div Semifinals, 3-4 (Steam)
2015–16	52	24	23	2	1	51	144	158	3rd of 5, Bill Olhausen; 12th of 20, KIJHL	Lost Div Semifinals, 2-4 (Steam)
2016–17	47	20	22	2	3	45	157	156	3rd of 5, Bill Olhausen; 13th of 20, KIJHL	Lost Div Semifinals, 3-4 (Steam)
2017–18	47	27	15	1	4	59	221	171	2nd of 5, Bill Olhausen; 8th of 20, KIJHL	Lost Div Finals, 2-4 (Coyotes)
2018–19	49	43	3	1	2	89	276	111	1st of 5, Bill Olhausen; 1st of 20, KJHL	Lost Conference Finals, 2-4 (Grizzlies)
2019–20	49	32	12	3	2	69	186	130	1st of 5, Bill Olhausen; 4th of 20, KIJHL	Playoffs interrupted by COVID-19
2020-21	4	2	2	0	0	4	11	11	Season cancelled due to COVID-19	
2021-22	42	26	13	0	3	55	158	135	2nd of 5, Bill Ohlhausen; 7th of 19, KIJHL	Lost Div Semifinals, 1-4 (Steam)
2022-23	44	6	34	0	3	16	95	205	5th of 5, Bill Ohlhausen; 19th of 19 KIJHL	Did not qualify for playoff season
2023-24	44	16	324	0	1	36	123	192	4th of 5, Bill Ohlhausen; 15th of 20 KIJHL	Lost Div Semifinals, 1-4 (Posse)
2024-25	44	19	21	1	3	42	161	188	5th of 6, Bill Ohlhausen; 8th of 11, O/S Conference; 13th of 21 KIJHL	Did not qualify for playoff season
2025-26	44	26	12	3	3	58	184	159	3rd of 6, Bill Ohlhausen; 4th of 11, O/S Conference; 7th of 21 KIJHL	Lost Div Semifinals, 3-4 (Posse)
Moving to Independent Western International Junior Hockey League

=== Playoffs ===
Season	Division Semifinals	Division Finals	Conference Finals	KIJHL Championship
2010-11	W, 4-3, Princeton	L, 0-4, Osoyoos	—	—
2011-12	W, 4-2, Osoyoos	W, 4-1, Princeton	W, 4-1, Sicamous	L, 0-4, Beaver Valley
2012-13	W, 4-2, Summerland	L, 2-4, Osoyoos	—	—
2013-14	L, 0-4, Osoyoos	—	—	—
2014-15	L, 3-4, Summerland	—	—	—
2015-16	L, 2-4, Summerland	—	—	—
2016-17	L, 3-4, Summerland	—	—	—
2017-18	W, 4-3, Summerland	L, 2-4, Osoyoos	—	—
2018-19	W, 4-0, Osoyoos	W, 4-1, Summerland	L, 2-4, Revelstoke	—
2019-20	W, 4-1, North Okanagan	1-1, Princeton	Playoffs cancelled due to COVID-19	
2020-21	Playoffs not held due to COVID-19			
2021-22	L, 1-4, Summerland	—	—	—
2022-23	Did not qualify			
2023-24	L, 1-4, Princeton	—	—	—
2024-25	Did not qualify			
