= Grand Forks Border Bruins =

Canadian junior ice hockey team

- City: Grand Forks, British Columbia
- League: KIJHL (1969-2026); BCHC (2026-present)
- Division: Kootenay
- Founded: 1969–70
- Home arena: Jack Goddard Memorial Arena
- Colours: Black, gold and white
- Owner: Mark Szynkaruk
- General manager: Dave Hnatiuk
- Head coach: Dave Hnatiuk
- Website: www.borderbruins.ca/

Franchise history
- 1969–2026: Grand Forks Border Bruins (KIJHL)
- 2026-present: Grand Forks Border Bruins (BCHC)

The Grand Forks Border Bruins are a junior ice hockey team based in Grand Forks, British Columbia, Canada. They are set to compete in the Kootenay Division in the British Columbia Hockey Conference (BCHC) beginning in the 2026–27 season after playing in the Kootenay International Junior Hockey League (KIJHL). They play their home games at the Jack Goddard Memorial Arena.

== History ==
The Border Bruins joined the KIJHL in 1969.

Since 2021, the Border Bruins have been owned by Mark Szynkaruk, a local physician in the community of Grand Forks.

On April 28, 2025, the Border Bruins became the first team in KIJHL history to win the Presidents Cup, Kootenay Conference, Teck Cup, and Mowat Cup in a single playoff run after a 9–6 victory over the Ridge Meadows Flames.

On April 20, 2026, the Border Bruins were named as one of 22 teams joining the BCHC, leaving the KIJHL with the remaining 12 teams.

== Season-by-season record ==
Note: GP = Games played, W = Wins, L = Losses, T = Ties, OTL = Overtime Losses, Pts = Points, GF = Goals for, GA = Goals against

Records as of April 28, 2025.

Season	GP	W	L	T	OTL	Pts	GF	GA	Finish	Playoffs
1969–70	32	1	31	0	―	2	67	352	5th, KHL	
1970–71	30	9	21	0	―	18			4th, WKHL	
1971–72	32	9	23	0	―	18	143	247	5th, WKHL	
1972–73	Did not participate									
1973–74	30	14	16	0	―	28	163	206	1st, West	Lost in Finals (Colts)
1974–75	34	14	20	0	―	28	187	201	3rd, West	
1975–76	34	11	23	0	―	22	152	190	4th, West	
1976–77	44	13	31	0	―	26	178	277	5th, West	
1977–78	42	12	29	1	―	25	172	243	5th, West	
1978–79	40	15	25	0	―	30	203	226	3rd, West	
1979–80	40	31	9	0	―	62	332	182	1st, West	
1980–81	40	9	30	1	―	19	216	340	5th, West	
1981–82	42	7	34	1	―	15	193	368	6th, West	
1982–83	42	9	32	1	―	19	210	353	6th, West	
1983–84	40	16	24	0	―	32	227	273	5th, West	
1984–85	40	4	36	0	―	8	199	401	7th, West	
1985–86	42	20	22	0	―	40	247	256	3rd, West	
1986–87	Did not participate									
1987–88	42	3	38	1	―	7	148	436	5th, West	
1988–89	45	6	39	0	―	12	179	389	6th, West	
1989–90	40	22	18	0	―	44	227	195	3rd, West	
1990–91	30	22	7	1	―	45	198	169	4th, West	
1991–92	38	20	16	2	―	42	208	188	3rd, West	
1992–93	42	37	5	0	―	74	336	115	1st, West	
1993–94	40	13	25	2	―	28	192	296	5th, West	
1994–95	44	18	26	―	0	36	191	231	3rd, West	
1995–96	42	23	19	0	―	46	206	170	3rd, West	
1996–97	41	22	18	0	―	45	188	174	3rd, Neil Murdoch	
1997–98	50	12	37	1	―	25	182	282	5th, Neil Murdoch	Did not qualify
1998–99	50	11	36	3	―	25	166	241	6th, Neil Murdoch	Did not qualify
1999–2000	46	18	25	3	―	39	232	241	6th, Neil Murdoch	Did not qualify
2000–01	58	9	44	3	2	23	171	347	7th, Neil Murdoch	Did not qualify
2001–02	50	10	35	2	3	25	148	269	5th, Neil Murdoch	Did not qualify
2002–03	50	15	29	3	2	35	148	219	5th, Neil Murdoch	Did not qualify
2003–04	50	8	32	6	4	26	128	223	5th, Neil Murdoch	Did not qualify
2004–05	50	6	42	0	2	14	128	324	5th, Neil Murdoch	Did not qualify
2005–06	50	4	40	2	4	14	135	302	5th, Neil Murdoch	Did not qualify
2006–07	52	13	32	―	7	33	156	257	5th, Neil Murdoch	Did not qualify
2007–08	52	18	29	―	5	41	164	239	4th, Neil Murdoch: West	Did not qualify
2008–09	52	11	39	―	2	24	132	278	5th, Neil Murdoch	Did not qualify
2009–10	50	6	42	1	1	14	119	284	5th, Neil Murdoch	Did not qualify
2010–11	50	8	41	0	1	17	145	267	5th, Neil Murdoch	Did not qualify
2011–12	52	1	49	0	2	4	106	455	5th, Neil Murdoch	Did not qualify
2012–13	52	8	40	1	3	20	130	273	5th, Neil Murdoch	Did not qualify
2013–14	52	16	32	2	2	36	186	250	5th, Neil Murdoch	Did not qualify
2014–15	52	8	40	1	3	20	129	293	5th, Neil Murdoch	Did not qualify
2015–16	52	23	24	0	5	51	145	184	3rd, Neil Murdoch	Lost in division finals, 1–4 (Nitehawks)
2016–17	47	20	21	3	3	46	173	194	4th, Neil Murdoch	Lost division semifinals, 1–4 (Nitehawks)
2017–18	47	15	27	2	2	35	131	177	4th, Neil Murdoch	Lost in division semifinals, 1–4 (Leafs)
2018–19	49	21	25	1	2	45	184	209	3rd, Neil Murdoch	Lost in division semifinals, 0–4 (Nitehawks)
2019–20	49	13	31	1	4	31	143	233	5th, Neil Murdoch	Did not qualify
2020–21	3	0	3	0	0	0	5	19	Remaining season cancelled due to COVID-19	
2021–22	42	5	34	1	2	13	79	178	5th, Neil Murdoch	Did not qualify
2022–23	44	25	16	—	3	53	146	133	1st, Neil Murdoch	Lost in division semifinal, 1–4 (Thunder Cats)
2023–24	44	28	11	3	2	61	79	178	2nd, Neil Murdoch	Won division semifinal, 4–1 (Leafs); Lost in division finals, 2–4 (Nitehawks)
2024–25	44	33	6	4	1	71	224	117	1st, Neil Murdoch	Won division semifinal 4–0 (Castlegar Rebels); Won division finals 4–0 (Nitehawks); Won conference finals 4–1 (Kimberley Dynamiters} Won league finals 4–0 (Revelstoke Grizzlies} Advance to Provincial Jr A Championships; Won Mowat Cup 4–1 (Ridge Meadows Flames])

=== Playoffs ===
Records as of March 16, 2024.

Season	1st Round	2nd Round	3rd Round	Finals
1997–98	Did not qualify			
1998–99	Did not qualify			
1999–00	Did not qualify			
2000–01	Did not qualify			
2001–02	Did not qualify			
2002–03	Did not qualify			
2003–04	Did not qualify			
2004–05	Did not qualify			
2005–06	Did not qualify			
2006–07	Did not qualify			
2007–08	Did not qualify			
2008–09	Did not qualify			
2009–10	Did not qualify			
2010-11	Did not qualify			
2011–12	Did not qualify			
2012–13	Did not qualify			
2013–14	Did not qualify			
2014–15	Did not qualify			
2015–16	W, 4–2, Castlegar	L, 1–4, Beaver Valley	—	—
2016–17	L, 0–4, Beaver Valley	—	—	—
2017–18	L, 3—4 Nelson	—	—	—
2018–19	L, 0–4 Beaver Valley	—	—	—
2019–20	Did not qualify			
2020–21	Playoffs cancelled due to coronavirus pandemic			
2021–22	Did not qualify			
2022–23	L, 1–4, Creston Valley	—	—	—
2023–24	W, 4–1, Nelson	L, 2–4, Beaver Valley	—	—
2024–25	W, 4–0, Castlegar	W, 4–0, Beaver Valley	W, 4–1, Kimberley Dynamiters	W, 4–0, Revelstoke Grizzlies

== British Columbia Jr A provincial championships ==
Season	Record	Standing	Result
2024–25	Won, 9–6, Ridge Meadows Flames	3–1–0	Champions

== NHL alumni ==
List of team alumni to play in the National Hockey League (NHL):

- Ron Areshenkoff
- Alan Kerr
- Glenn Merkosky
- Steve Passmore
- Rudy Poeschek
- Craig Redmond
- Kevin Sawyer

== Awards and trophies ==
List of awards:

Regular Season Neil Murdoch Division champions

- 2022–23
- 2024–25

Presidents Cup champions

- 2024–25

Kootenay Conference champions

- 2024–25

KIJHL champions

- 2024–25

Mowat Cup champions

- 2024–25

Broadcast of the Year

- Kevin Mckinnon PxP, Cody Thate CC, Les Johnson CO: 2021–22
- Kevin Mckinnon PxP, Cody Thate CC, Les Johnson CO: 2022–23
- Kevin Mckinnon PxP, Cody Thate CC, Les Johnson CO, Bronwen Bird SC: 2023–24

Coach of the Year

- Dave Hnatiuk 2022–23 (Neil Murdoch Div)
- Dave Hnatiuk 2024–25

Most sportsmanlike player

- Neil Eisenhut 1984–85
- Craig Materi 2004–05
- Chad Bates 2022–23 (Neil Murdoch Division)

Most popular player

- Kelly English (1994–95)

Most valuable player

- Peter Smith (2008–09)
- Levi Astill (2024–25)

Top scorer

- Spencer Horning (2022–23, Neil Murdoch Div — 47 Points)
- Levi Astill (2024–25, 91 points)

Rookie of the Year

- Russel Kosec (2022–23, Neil Murdoch Div — 27 points)
- Brandon Gray (2024–25, 53 points)

Top defenceman

- Russel Kosec (2024–25, 42 points)

Most paluable player (playoffs)

- Tyler Burke (2024–25, 38 points in 21 games)
