= Cyclone Taylor Cup =

The Cyclone Taylor Cup tournament serves as the British Columbia Provincial Junior B Hockey Championship. The annual tournament is held amongst the champions of British Columbia's three Junior B ice hockey leagues, as well as a host team. The winner of the Cyclone Taylor Cup moves on to the Western Canada Junior B championship, the Keystone Cup.

The tournament and championship trophy is named after Hockey Hall of Famer Cyclone Taylor, who led the Vancouver Millionaires in goals during their 1915 Stanley Cup Final victory.

== Tournament Organization ==
The tournament is played between four teams in a single round-robin format. The top two teams meet in the championship game.

The 2023 qualifiers are as follows:

| League | Representative |
|---|---|
| Kootenay International Junior Hockey League | Kimberley Dynamiters |
| Pacific Junior Hockey League | Delta Ice Hawks |
| Vancouver Island Junior Hockey League | Oceanside Generals |
| Host (KIJHL) | Revelstoke Grizzlies |

== Cyclone Taylor Cup 2019 ==
In Richmond, British Columbia

Cyclone Taylor Round Robin
| Rank | Team | League | W-L-T | GF | GA |
| 1 | (British Columbia) Campbell River Storm (host) | VIJHL | 0–0–0 | 0 | 0 |
| 2 | (British Columbia) North Vancouver Wolf Pack | PJHL | 0–0–0 | 0 | 0 |
| 3 | (British Columbia) Campbell River Storm | VIJHL | 0–0–0 | 0 | 0 |
| 4 | (British Columbia) tbd | KIJHL | 0–0–0 | 0 | 0 |

=== Round Robin ===
Round Robin
| Game | Away | Score | Home | Score |
April 11, 2019
| 1 | Victoria Cougars | - | (KIJHL) | - |
| 2 | Campbell River Storm | - | North Vancouver Wolf Pack | - |
April 12, 2019
| 3 | (KIJHL) | - | North Vancouver Wolf Pack | - |
| 4 | Victoria Cougars | - | Campbell River Storm | - |
April 13, 2019
| 5 | North Vancouver Wolf Pack | - | Victoria Cougars | - |
| 6 | (KIJHL) | - | Campbell River Storm | - |

=== Championship Round ===
See playoff round below

== Champions ==
=== Playdown Era ===
Bolded are Cyclone Taylor Cup champions. Italics represents runner-up.

After the implementation of the round robin during the 2003–04 season, (Rep) denotes a league runner-up that gained access to the tournament because their league champion was also the tournament host.

Prior to the 2003–04 season, the hosting duties were rotated through the three leagues, with the champions from the other two leagues playing off for the right to meet the host league's champion. The winner would then face the host league's champion in a best-of-three series for the Cyclone Taylor Cup, played over one weekend.

Early Playdowns
| Year | Champion | Finalist | Semi-finalist(s) |
| 1967 | Comox Totems (VI) | | |
| 1968 | Nelson Jr. Maple Leafs (KI) | | |
| 1969 | Fort St. John Golden Hawks (Pc) | | |
| 1970 | Trail Smoke Eaters (KI) | | |
| 1971 | Victoria Cubs (VI) | | |
| 1972 | Nor Wes Caps (PI) | | |
| 1973 | Nor Wes Caps (PI) | | |
| 1974 | Cranbrook Colts (KI) | | |
| 1975 | Cranbrook Colts (KI) | | |
| 1976 | Saanich Braves (VI) | Prince George Spruce Kings (PC) | Cranbrook (KI), |
| 1977 | Quesnel Millionaires (PC) | | |
| 1978 | Quesnel Millionaires (PC) | | |
| 1979 | Quesnel Millionaires (PC) | | |
| 1980 | Kimberley Knights (KI) | | |
3-League Playdowns
| Year | Kootenay | Pacific | Vancouver Island |
| 1981 | Kimberley Knights | **Northwest Americans** | Oak Bay Flyers |
| 1982 | **Cranbrook Colts** | Northwest Americans | Kerry Park Islanders |
| 1983 | Cranbrook Colts | **North Shore Flames** | Oak Bay Flyers |
| 1984 | **Cranbrook Colts** | North Shore Flames | Saanich Braves |
| 1985 | **Cranbrook Colts** | North Shore Flames | Oak Bay Flyers |
| 1986 | **Cranbrook Colts** | Northwest Americans | Kerry Park Islanders |
| 1987 | **Cranbrook Colts** | Burnaby Bluehawks | Juan de Fuca Gulls |
| 1988 | Columbia Valley Rockies | **White Rock Whalers** | Saanich Braves |
| 1989 | **Columbia Valley Rockies** | Abbotsford Pilots | Peninsula Eagles |
| 1990 | Columbia Valley Rockies | **Burnaby Bluehawks** | Kerry Park Islanders |
| 1991 | **Trail Smoke Eaters** | Richmond Sockeyes | Kerry Park Islanders |
| 1992 | Trail Smoke Eaters | **Richmond Sockeyes** | Parksville Generals |
| 1993 | Nelson Leafs | **Coquitlam Warriors** | Kerry Park Islanders |
| 1994 | North Okanagan Kings | **Grandview Steelers** | Kerry Park Islanders |
| 1995 | **Sicamous Eagles** | Port Coquitlam Buckeroos | Comox Valley Glacier Kings |
| 1996 | Castlegar Rebels | **Ridge Meadows Flames** | Saanich Braves |
| 1997 | **Beaver Valley Nitehawks** | Port Coquitlam Buckeroos | Parksville Generals |
| 1998 | Revelstoke Grizzlies | **Ridge Meadows Flames** | Campbell River Storm |
| 1999 | Beaver Valley Nitehawks | Abbotsford Pilots | **Campbell River Storm** |
| 2000 | Nelson Leafs | **Abbotsford Pilots** | Campbell River Storm |
| 2001 | **Beaver Valley Nitehawks** | Delta Ice Hawks | Campbell River Storm |
| 2002 | **Sicamous Eagles** | Abbotsford Pilots | Campbell River Storm |
| 2003 | Beaver Valley Nitehawks | **Richmond Sockeyes** | Campbell River Storm |

=== Round Robin Format ===
| Year | Gold Medal Game | | | Bronze Medal Game | | |
| Year | Champions | Score | Finalists | Third Place | Score | Fourth Place |
|---|---|---|---|---|---|---|
| 2004 | Richmond Sockeyes; PIJHL | **3 – 2** | Campbell River Storm; VIJHL (host) | Peninsula Panthers; VIJHL | | Beaver Valley Nitehawks; KIJHL |
| 2005 | Osoyoos Storm; KIJHL (Host) | **6 – 2** | Beaver Valley Nitehawks; KIJHL | Victoria Cougars; VIJHL | **4 – 2** | Abbotsford Pilots; PIJHL |
| 2006 | Delta Ice Hawks; PIJHL | **4 – 1** | Abbotsford Pilots; PIJHL (Host) | Sicamous Eagles; KIJHL | **5 – 4** | Kerry Park Islanders; VIJHL |
| 2007 | Victoria Cougars; VIJHL (Host) | **4 – 1** | Abbotsford Pilots; PIJHL | Kerry Park Islanders; VIJHL | **4 – 2** | Fernie Ghostriders; KIJHL |
| 2008 | Grandview Steelers; PIJHL | **4 – 3** | Kimberley Dynamiters; KIJHL (Host) | Fernie Ghostriders; KIJHL | **5 – 3** | Victoria Cougars; VIJHL |
| 2009 | Richmond Sockeyes; PIJHL (Host) | **6 – 2** | Nelson Leafs; KIJHL | Oceanside Generals; VIJHL | **5 – 3** | Abbotsford Pilots; PIJHL |
| 2010 | Revelstoke Grizzlies; KIJHL | **4 – 1** | Peninsula Panthers; VIJHL | Aldergrove Kodiaks; PIJHL | **5 – 4** | Oceanside Generals; VIJHL (Host)Kimberley |
| 2011 | Peninsula Panthers; VIJHL | **5 – 3** | Fernie Ghostriders; KIJHL (Host) | Osoyoos Coyotes; KIJHL | **3 – 0** | Richmond Sockeyes; PIJHL |
| 2012 | Abbotsford Pilots; PIJHL (Host) | **3 – 2**; 2OT | Victoria Cougars; VIJHL | Delta Ice Hawks; PIJHL | **5 – 3** | Beaver Valley Nitehawks; KIJHL |
| 2013 | Richmond Sockeyes; PJHL | **4 – 1** | Victoria Cougars; VIJHL | Castlegar Rebels; KIJHL | **5 – 4** | Comox Valley Glacier Kings; VIJHL (Host) |
| 2014 | Beaver Valley Nitehawks; KIJHL | **5 – 2** | Aldergrove Kodiaks; PJHL | Victoria Cougars; VIJHL | **3 – 0** | Nelson Leafs; KIJHL (Host) |
| 2015 | Campbell River Storm; VIJHL | **6 – 5** | Kimberley Dynamiters; KIJHL | Mission City Outlaws; PJHL-(host) | **7 – 0** | North Vancouver Wolf Pack; PJHL |
| 2016 | 100 Mile House Wranglers; KIJHL | **5 – 4** | Victoria Cougars; VIJHL-(host) | Campbell River Storm; VIJHL | **8 – 4** | Mission City Outlaws; PJHL |
| 2017 | Beaver Valley Nitehawks; KIJHL | **6 – 2** | Campbell River Storm; VIJHL | Creston Valley Thunder Cats; KIJHL (Host) | **3 – 0** | Aldergrove Kodiaks; PJHL |
| 2018 | Richmond Sockeyes; PJHL-(host) | **5 - 1** | Delta Ice Hawks; PJHL | Kimberley Dynamiters; KIJHL | **7-1** | Campbell River Storm; VIJHL |
| 2019 | Revelstoke Grizzlies KIJHL | **5 - 1** | Victoria Cougars VIJHL | N. Vancouver Wolf Pack PJHL | **3 - 2** OT | Campbell River Storm VIJHL (Host) |
| 2020 | No Tournament; COVID | | | | | |
| 2021 | No Tournament; COVID | | | | | |
| 2022 | Langley Trappers; PJHL | **4-2** | Delta Ice Hawks; PJHL-(host) | Revelstoke Grizzlies; KIJHL | **4-2** | Peninsula Panthers; VIJHL |
| 2023 | Revelstoke Grizzlies; KIJHL-(host) | **4-1** | Kimberley Dynamiters; KIJHL | Oceanside Generals; VIJHL | **4-2** | Delta Ice Hawks; PJHL |

== Sources ==
- Zillich, Tom (4 April 2022). "Delta hosts B.C.'s top Junior B hockey teams for Cyclone Taylor Cup, starting Thursday". North Delta Reporter. Black Press Media.
