= Westshore Stingers =

- City: Victoria, British Columbia
- League: Vancouver Island Junior Hockey League
- Division: South
- Founded: 2005–06
- Home arena: Bear Mountain Arena
- Colours: Black, gold, silver, white
- Owner(s): (Canada)
- General manager: (Canada)
- Head coach: (Canada)
- Website: eteamz.com/westshorestingers

Franchise history
- 2005-08: Sooke Stingers
- 2008-2011: Westshore Stingers

The Westshore Stingers were a junior "B" ice hockey team based in Victoria, British Columbia, Canada. They were members of the South Division of the Vancouver Island Junior Hockey League (VIJHL). The Stingers played their home games at Bear Mountain Arena. John Butler-Smith was the team's last president and general manager; and Bryan Grant was the last coach.

The team was founded in 2005 in Sooke, British Columbia as the Sooke Stingers until relocating to Victoria in 2008.

== Legacy ==
In the 2008-09 season, the Stingers completed the season without earning a single point, losing all 48 regular season and 4 playoff games in regulation time. Despite multiple losses in overtime in the following season, the losing streak would extend 91 games until the dangerous combination of Jake Nixon, Travis Oickle, and Brandon Krupa led the stingers to their first win since relocating to Bear Mountain Arena. The Westshore Stingers were arguably the worst franchise in the history of organized hockey.

== Controversy ==
On November 22, 2010, before the game vs the Victoria Cougars, the Stingers took the ice for warm-up only to change back into "civilian clothing" to protest the lack of practice time (from 1 practice to 2 practices a week – most teams have 3–5 a week) and other issues with management. After an hour delay of the game, only the threat of suspension coaxed the team onto the ice, where they were beaten 16–0. Two days later, on November 24, as punishment for the protest, Captain Jacob Nixon, Assistant Captain Nolin Weibe and starting goaltender Johnny Webb were released by the club. Stingers GM John Butler-Smith defended the move, saying the club was "dealing in shenanigans and working to be part of the problem, not working to be part of the solution." Nolin Weibe disagreed, saying "We are the players who spoke out for the team and all three of us have been let go. I believe we are being used as scapegoats. Hopefully, the league will step in. I just want to play hockey." This move also left the club with too few players to compete. As a result, the team missed the next 4 games. On December 4, 2010, the league's board of directors met to discuss the situation, and the team was given a 1-year leave of absence from the league. The players were drafted away in a dispersal draft on December 10, 2010. The team has been suspended for the 2011–2012 season. Owner and GM John Butler Smith has relinquished ownership of the team; this also allowed the Kerry Park Islanders to be moved to the South Division. An unnamed person has reportedly put in an ownership bid for the team, but details about money have not been released.

== Season-by-season record ==
Note: GP = Games played, W = Wins, L = Losses, T = Ties, OTL = Overtime Losses, Pts = Points, GF = Goals for, GA = Goals against

Season	GP	W	L	OTL	Pts	GF	GA	Finish	Playoffs
2005-06	42	2	40	0	4	73	348	4th, North	Lost in Division Semifinals, 0-4 (Storm)
2006-07	48	4	40	3	11	120	329	4th, South	
2007-08	48	3	42	3	9	124	330	4th, South	
2008-09	48	0	48	0	0	82	348	4th, South	Lost in Quarterfinals, 0-4
2009–10	48	1	45	1	4	81	330	4th, South	Lost in Quarterfinals, 0-4
2010-11	14	0	14	0	0	15	98	4th, South	Suspended during Regular Season
