= Westshore Wolves =

Junior ice hockey team

- City: Colwood, British Columbia
- League: Vancouver Island Junior Hockey League
- Division: South
- Founded: 2012
- Home arena: The Q Centre
- Colours: Blue, Black, Silver
- General manager: Brian Passmore
- Head coach: Brian Passmore
- Asst. coach: Mark Hall
- Parent club: Langley Rivermen
- Website: westshorewolves.ca

The Westshore Wolves are a junior ice hockey team based in Colwood, British Columbia, Canada. They are a member of the South Division of the Vancouver Island Junior Hockey League (VIJHL). The Wolves entered the VIJHL in 2012, replacing a former franchise, the Westshore Stingers. They play their home games at The Q Centre under head coach Mike Nesbitt. They are the official farm team of the Langley Rivermen.

== History ==
The Wolves were one of two expansion teams in the 2012–13 VIJHL season, the other being the Nanaimo Buccaneers. In three seasons, the Wolves have done relatively well, finishing top three in their division every year. As with many expansion franchises, they have slowly gained momentum and become a strong team within a few years..

In 2024, the VIJHL announced that it would withdraw from the Hockey Canada framework and operate as an independent farm league for the BCHL beginning in the 2024–25 BCHL season. Soon thereafter, the Westshore Wolves became the farm team of the Langley Rivermen.

== Season-by-season record ==
Note: GP - Games Played, W - Wins, L - Losses, T - Ties, OTL - Overtime Losses, Pts - Points, GF - Goals for, GA - Goals against

Season	GP	W	L	T	OTL	Pts	GF	GA	Finish	Playoffs
2012–13	48	28	19	0	1	57	183	189	3rd, South	Lost div. semi-final, 2-4 (Saanich)
2013–14	48	21	19	3	5	50	194	216	3rd, South	Lost div. semi-final, 1-4 (Peninsula)
2014–15	48	29	16	2	1	61	213	204	2nd, South	Won Div. Semifinal, 4.2 Saanich; Lost division final, 4-0 (Victoria)
2015–16	48	15	10	0	3	33	105	115	3rd, South	Lost div. semi-final, 1-4 (Peninsula)
2016–17	48	20	23	2	3	45	148	175	4th of 5 South; 7th of 9 VIJHL	Lost div. semi-final, 2-4 (Victoria)
2017–18	48	25	17	2	3	53	168	168	2nd of 5 South; 4th of 9 VIJHL	Won quarterfinal, 4-1 (Victoria); Lost semifinals, 0-4 (Storm)
2018–19	48	17	22	3	6	43	143	163	4th of 5 South; 6th of 9 VIJHL	Lost div. semi-final, 1-4 (Buccaneers)
2019–20	48	26	18	0	4	174	175	56	3rd of 5 South; 5th of 9 VIJHL	Lost quarterfinals, 1-4 (Peninsula)
2020–21	12	7	4	0	1	55	48	15		Remaining season and playoffs lost due to COVID-19
2021–22	49	28	18	0	3	195	182	59	3rd of 5 South; 5th of 11 VIJHL	Lost quarterfinals, 2-4 (Panthers)
2022–23	48	14	32	1	1	126	199	30	5th of 5 South; 10th of 11 VIJHL	Did not Qualify for post season play
2023–24	48	28	16	3	1	194	140	60	3rd of 5 South; 5th of 11 VIJHL	Lost quarterfinals, 1-4 (Predators)
2024–25	48	29	12	6	1	185	146	65	3rd of 5 South; 5th of 11 VIJHL	Lost Div Semifinals, 0-4 (Panthers)
2025–26	48	34	9	4	0	237	152	72	3rd of 5 South; 3rd of 11 VIJHL	Lost Div Semifinals, 1-4 (Victoria)
