= Victoria Cougars (disambiguation) =

Victoria Cougars may refer to any of several ice hockey teams from Victoria, British Columbia, Canada:

== Active teams ==
- Victoria Cougars (VIJHL), a junior B team in the Vancouver Island Junior Hockey League (1998–present)

== Former teams ==
- Victoria Cougars, a professional team in the Pacific Coast Hockey Association (1911–24) and the Western Canada Hockey League (1924–26, 1925 Stanley Cup champions)
- Victoria Cougars (1949–1961), a minor professional team in the Pacific Coast Hockey League (1949–52) and Western Hockey League (1952–61)
- Victoria Cougars (WHL), a major junior team in the Western Hockey League (1971–94), originally a junior A team in the Pacific Coast Junior Hockey League (1962–67) and British Columbia Junior Hockey League (1967–71)
