= Lake Cowichan Kraken =

Junior ice hockey team in British Columbia

- City: Lake Cowichan
- League: VIJHL
- Division: North
- Founded: 2021
- Home arena: Cowichan Lake Sports Arena
- Colours
- Owners: Luke Armstrong and Harbs Bains
- General manager: Harbs Bains
- Head coach: Dan Lemmon
- Website: krakenhockey.ca

The Lake Cowichan Kraken are a Junior ice hockey team in the Vancouver Island Junior Hockey League based in Lake Cowichan, British Columbia. The team debuted as an expansion franchise in the 2021–22 VIJHL season.

== Team identity ==
The name "Kraken" refers to the mythical sea monster said to appear in the sea between Norway and Iceland. The team chose its name as an homage to the sea monster of local folklore called the Stin’Qua – which was said to dwell in Lake Cowichan – and to the NHL Seattle Kraken, which debuted in the 2021–22 NHL season.

== Arena ==
The teams plays its home games at the Cowichan Lake Sports Arena which opened in 1970. The team set an attendance record of 352 on 5 February 2023 during its home game against the Saanich Predators. A new team dressing room was added in 2023.

== Season-by-season record ==
The team failed to qualify for the post-season during its first three years. In 2024–25, the team finished the regular season in fourth place in their division and were swept in the first round of the playoffs by the first-place Campbell River Storm.

Season-by-season record
Season	GP	W	L	OTL	SOL	T	Pts	Finish	Playoffs
2021–22	51	19	30	1	1	0	40	5th in division 9th overall	Did not qualify
2022–23	48	16	28	2	2	0	36	5th in division 9th overall	Did not qualify
2023–24	48	15	31	0	2	0	32	4th in division 9th overall	Did not qualify
2024–25	48	19	25	3	1	0	42	4th in division 8th overall	Lost first round against Campbell River (4:0)
2025–26	48	14	31	1	2	0	31	6th in division 9th overall	Did not qualify
