= The Q Centre =

Arena in Colwood, British Columbia, Canada

Coordinates: 48°26′40″N 123°27′48″W

- Interactive map of The Q Centre
- Former names: Bear Mountain Arena (2004–2014)
- Location: Colwood, British Columbia, Canada
- Operator: West Shore Parks & Recreation
- Capacity: 2,780 (box lacrosse, curling, ice hockey)

Construction
- Opened: 2004

Tenants
- Victoria Grizzlies (BCHL) (2004–present); Victoria Salmon Kings (ECHL) (2004–2005); Victoria Shamrocks (WLA) (2004–present); Victoria Sr. B Shamrocks (WCSLA) (2022–present); Westshore Wolves (VIJHL) (2012–present); Westshore Bears (PNWJLL) (2007–present)

The Q Centre (formerly Bear Mountain Arena) is in Colwood, British Columbia, Canada. In 2014, the arena was named "The Q Centre" after local radio station CKKQ-FM. The arena opened in February 2004, has 2,300 seats and houses year-round events for hockey and lacrosse. With an additional floor capacity of 860 people and standing room area for up to 480, this premier spectator facility can hold any type of event, from trade shows to major sporting and entertainment events.

The arena is hockey home of the BCHL Victoria Grizzlies. It was the home of the Victoria Salmon Kings for the 2004–05 ECHL season while their future home, the Save-On-Foods Memorial Centre was being built. In the summer months The Q serves as home to the WLA Victoria Shamrocks, Victoria Sr. B Shamrocks of the West Coast Senior Lacrosse Association and Westshore Bears of the Pacific Northwest Junior Lacrosse League. The venue has also hosted BCLA provincial box lacrosse championships.

The venue has hosted one of the biggest World Curling Tour events, the Bear Mountain Arena Curling Classic, annually since 2006. It also played host to the training camps of the Vancouver Canucks in September 2007 and the Tampa Bay Lightning in 2008.

The Q Centre was awarded an NHL pre-season game between the Vancouver Canucks vs San Jose Sharks. This occurred after the Panorama Recreation Centre, in North Saanich, home of the Peninsula Panthers won the 2015 Kraft Hockeyville Grand Prize.
