= Cyclone Taylor (disambiguation) =

Cyclone Taylor was a Canadian professional ice hockey player and civil servant.

It may also refer to:

- Cyclone Taylor Cup, a hockey tournament named after the Canadian hockey player.
- Cyclone Taylor Trophy, an award given each year to the most valuable player on the Vancouver Canucks of the NHL.
