= Trent Knorr =

Canadian ice hockey linesman

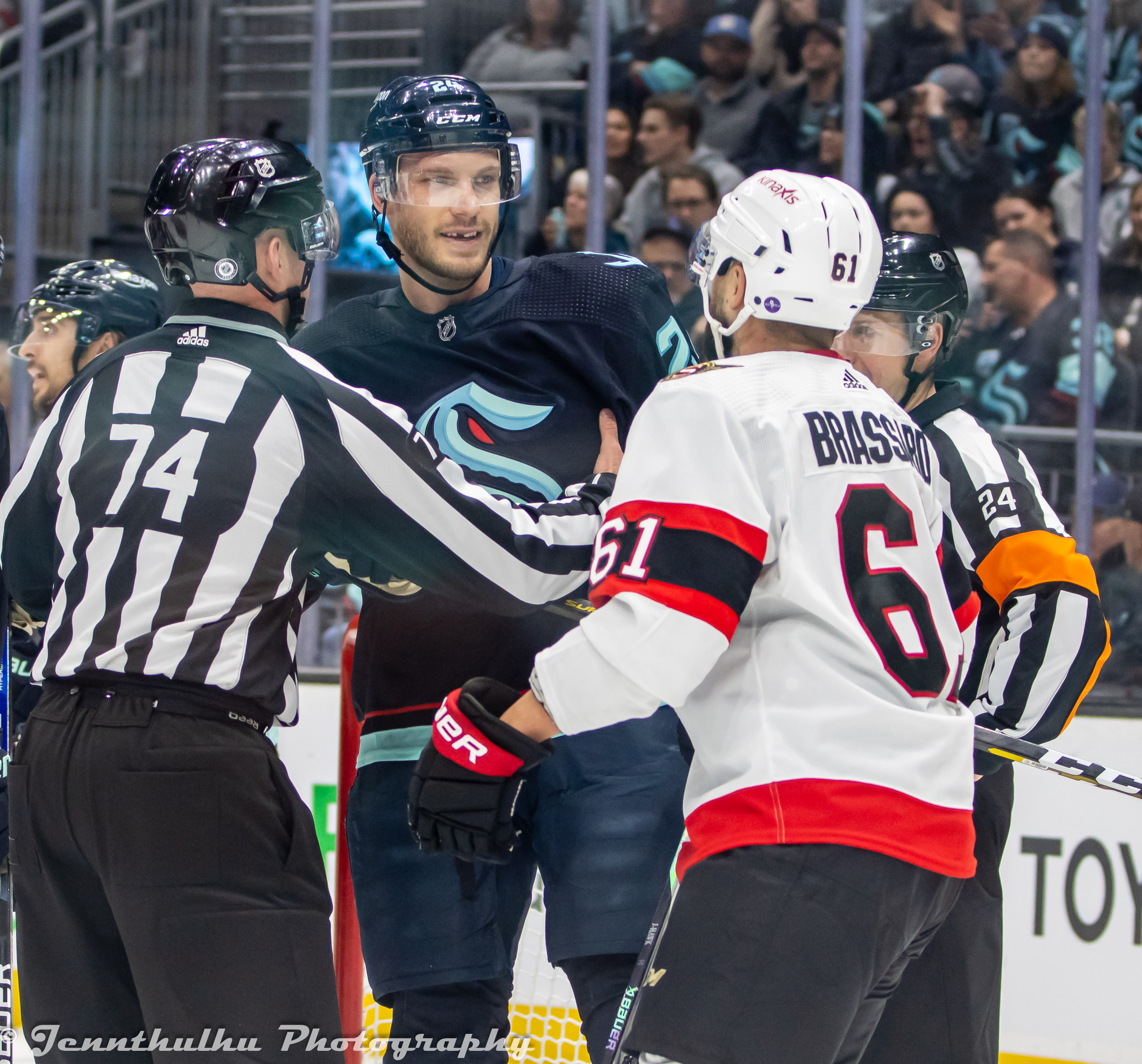
- Knorr separates Jamie Oleksiak and Derick Brassard during a 2023 game
- Born: 1986 (age 38–39); Powell River, British Columbia, Canada
- Occupation: Ice hockey official
- Years active: 2013–present
- Employer: National Hockey League

Trent Knorr is a Canadian ice hockey linesman currently officiating in the National Hockey League. He made his debut during the 2013–14 NHL season, and wears uniform number 74. As of the start of the 2024–25 season, he has worked 696 regular season games and 28 Stanley Cup playoff games.

Knorr worked his first professional game in the ECHL in 2005, at the age of 17.

Knorr worked in the Western Hockey League until 2013. He acted as a linesman at the 2010 Memorial Cup in Brandon, Manitoba.

Knorr made his NHL debut on November 13, 2013, officiating a match-up at the Xcel Energy Center between the Toronto Maple Leafs and Minnesota Wild. He has also worked as a linesman in the 2013-14 NHL season, debuting as such on February 26, 2014 at the Pepsi Center when the Colorado Avalanche took on the Los Angeles Kings; through March 11 he has worked five NHL matches as a linesman. Starting in the 2015-16 season, Knorr works as a full-time NHL linesman.

He is a linesman for the 2024 All Star Skills game.

Knorr played three seasons as a defenceman for the Victoria Cougars of the Vancouver Island Junior Hockey League.
