= Clayton Stoner =

Canadian ice hockey player (born 1985)

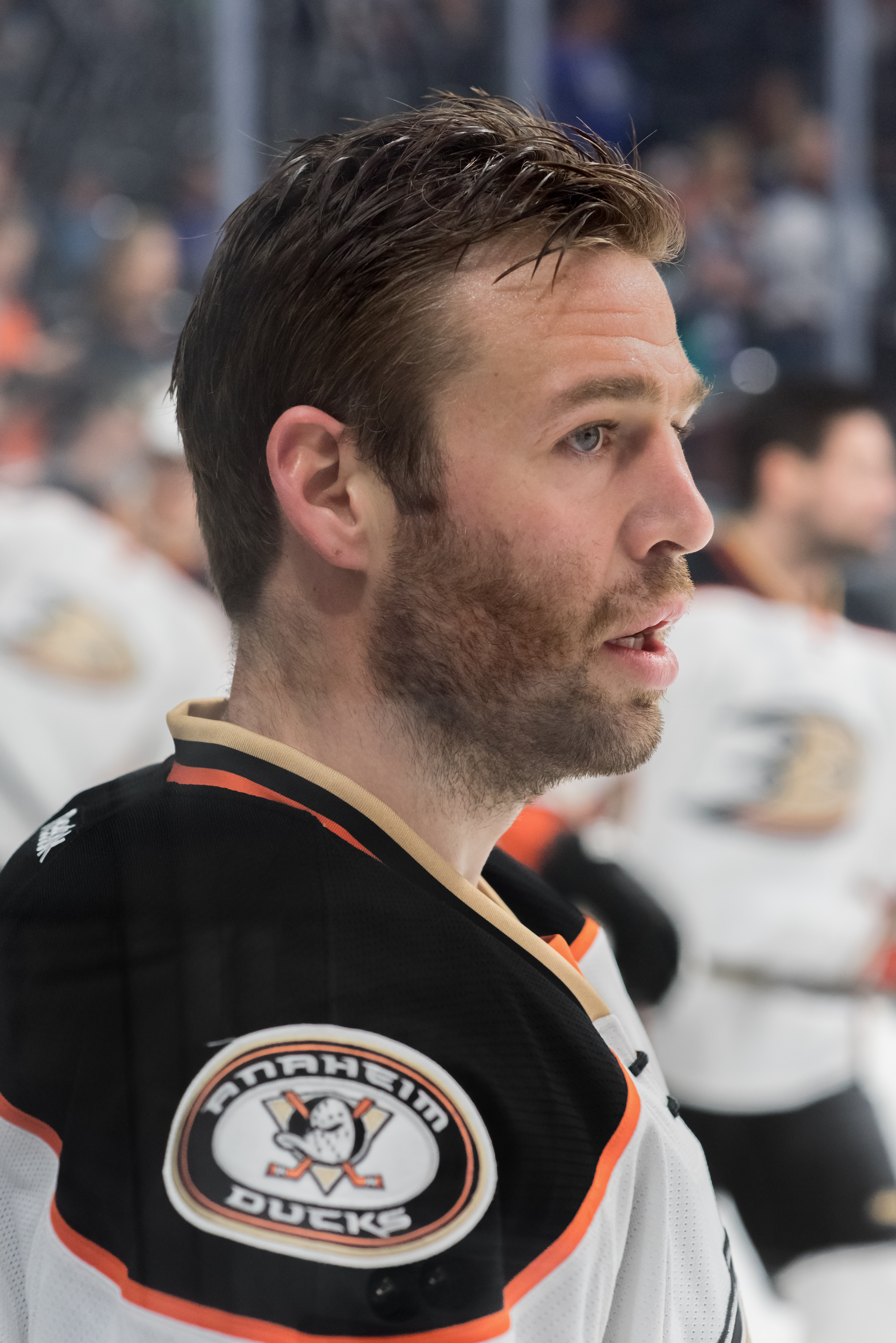
- Stoner with the Anaheim Ducks in 2016
- Born: February 19, 1985 (age 41) Port McNeill, British Columbia, Canada
- Height: 6 ft 4 in (193 cm)
- Weight: 205 lb (93 kg; 14 st 9 lb)
- Position: Defence
- Shot: Left
- Played for: Minnesota Wild; Anaheim Ducks
- NHL draft: 79th overall, 2004; Minnesota Wild
- Playing career: 2005–2017

Clayton Stoner (born February 19, 1985) is a Canadian former professional ice hockey defenceman. He was drafted in the third round, 79th overall, by the Minnesota Wild at the 2004 NHL entry draft. Stoner played his entire career with the Wild and the Anaheim Ducks franchises.

== Playing career ==
=== Amateur ===
Stoner played junior B for the Campbell River Storm of the VIJHL and junior A for the Powell River Kings of the BCHL He then played in the Western Hockey League (WHL) for the Tri-City Americans from 2003–04 to 2004–05. Prior to the beginning of the latter playing season, on June 26, 2004, Stoner was drafted by the Minnesota Wild with the 79th pick of the 2004 NHL entry draft.

=== Professional ===
Stoner began his professional playing career with the American Hockey League (AHL) affiliate of the Wild, the Houston Aeros, where he played for four-and-a-half seasons.

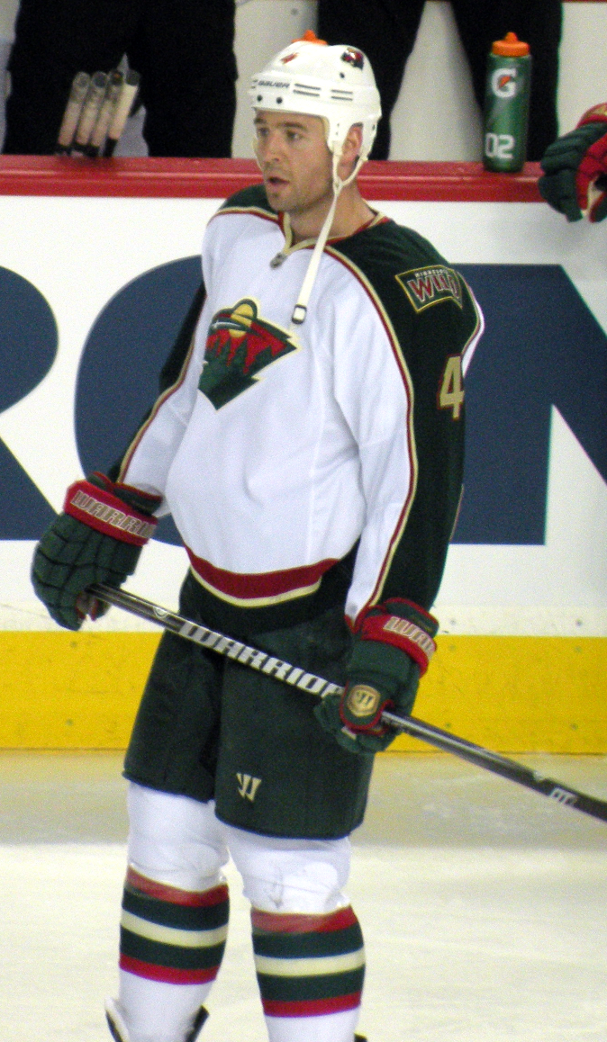
Stoner during his tenure with the Wild.

He eventually made his NHL debut in the 2009–10 season, playing in eight games and registering two assists and 12 penalty minutes. Stoner became an NHL regular beginning in the 2010–11 season, where he participated in 57 games for Minnesota. That season, he scored his first career NHL goal on January 4, 2011, against Johan Hedberg of the New Jersey Devils.

Stoner made headlines in 2014 in a fight against the Edmonton Oilers' Luke Gazdic, where Stoner had his finger in a "L"-shape, apparently dislocated. Nevertheless, Stoner was able to return to game with his finger taped up heavily, nearly engaging in another fight with Matt Hendricks, though the linesman separated the two before any punches were thrown.

On March 18, 2014, Stoner scored his fourth career NHL goal on a breakaway against the New York Islanders. Emerging out of the penalty box as his boarding penalty expired, Wild captain Mikko Koivu sprung him on a breakaway, where Stoner made a deke and slipped the puck past Islanders goaltender Anders Nilsson into the net for his first goal of the season – and his first in nearly two years – to give the Wild a 4–0 lead in an eventual 6–0 win.

During the 2012–13 NHL lock-out, Stoner played for HC '05 Banská Bystrica in the Slovak Extraliga, tallying five points.

On July 1, 2014, Stoner signed as a free agent with the Anaheim Ducks on a four-year, $13 million contract.

Approaching the final year of his contract, Stoner was selected by the Vegas Golden Knights at the 2017 NHL expansion draft on June 21, 2017. He was chosen with the incentive of the Ducks trading fellow defenceman Shea Theodore to the Golden Knights. After attending the Golden Knights inaugural training camp, Stoner suffered a return of his abdomen injury that limited him to just 14 games in the previous season. Approaching the 2017–18 season, Stoner was ruled out indefinitely and placed on the injured reserve list on October 3, 2017.

== Coaching career ==
On June 24, 2019, Stoner was announced to have joined the Vegas Golden Knights organization, accepting a junior development coaching role.

== Personal ==
Stoner made headlines in May 2013 after pictures taken of him on a hunting trip in British Columbia surfaced online, in which he killed a grizzly bear during the trip. The bear was known affectionately as "Cheeky" to local First Nations people. Although Stoner has claimed that hunt was legal, the incident has aroused controversy, as Stoner left the carcass after skinning the bear and removing its hide, as per local hunting regulations. Only residents of British Columbia can receive a license to hunt grizzlies. At the time, Stoner lived for the majority of the year in Minnesota whilst playing for the Wild. ESPN reported that he is accused of two counts of knowingly making a false statement to obtain a hunting license.

Stoner faced separate counts of hunting out of season, hunting without a license and unlawfully possessing dead wildlife related to the shooting of a bear near Bella Bella. A picture, released by Stoner via social media, circulated, showing Stoner proudly sporting the beheaded bear. Stoner was found guilty at a trial in Abbotsford, BC on Wednesday, January 27, 2016. In defence of his actions, Stoner released a public statement stating that he and his family enjoy hunting large game species as a group activity. He was ordered to pay a $10,000 fine for hunting without a proper licence.

== Career statistics ==
			Regular season					Playoffs
Season	Team	League	GP	G	A	Pts	PIM	GP	G	A	Pts	PIM
2000–01	Campbell River Storm	VIJHL	47	4	16	20	57	—	—	—	—	—
2000–01	Powell River Kings	BCHL	1	0	0	0	0	—	—	—	—	—
2001–02	Campbell River Storm	VIJHL	42	12	35	47	199	—	—	—	—	—
2001–02	Powell River Kings	BCHL	4	0	1	1	2	—	—	—	—	—
2002–03	Tri–City Americans	WHL	58	4	12	16	85	—	—	—	—	—
2003–04	Tri–City Americans	WHL	71	7	24	31	109	11	1	1	2	8
2004–05	Tri–City Americans	WHL	60	12	34	46	81	4	0	3	3	2
2005–06	Houston Aeros	AHL	73	6	18	24	92	3	1	1	2	7
2006–07	Houston Aeros	AHL	65	1	6	7	104	—	—	—	—	—
2007–08	Houston Aeros	AHL	56	3	12	15	78	5	0	0	0	2
2008–09	Houston Aeros	AHL	63	2	22	24	81	20	1	4	5	27
2009–10	Houston Aeros	AHL	26	3	7	10	52	—	—	—	—	—
2009–10	Minnesota Wild	NHL	8	0	2	2	12	—	—	—	—	—
2010–11	Minnesota Wild	NHL	57	2	7	9	96	—	—	—	—	—
2011–12	Minnesota Wild	NHL	51	1	4	5	62	—	—	—	—	—
2012–13	HC '05 Banská Bystrica	Slovak	8	1	4	5	16	—	—	—	—	—
2012–13	Minnesota Wild	NHL	48	0	10	10	42	1	0	1	1	0
2013–14	Minnesota Wild	NHL	63	1	4	5	84	13	1	2	3	26
2014–15	Anaheim Ducks	NHL	69	1	7	8	68	16	1	0	1	10
2015–16	Anaheim Ducks	NHL	50	1	5	6	67	1	0	0	0	0
2016–17	Anaheim Ducks	NHL	14	1	2	3	28	—	—	—	—	—
2016–17	San Diego Gulls	AHL	3	1	0	1	12	—	—	—	—	—
AHL totals			286	16	65	81	419	28	2	5	7	36
NHL totals			360	7	41	48	459	31	2	3	5	36

== Awards and honours ==
Award	Year
WHL
West Second All-Star Team	2005
