= Jordie Benn =

Canadian ice hockey player (born 1987)

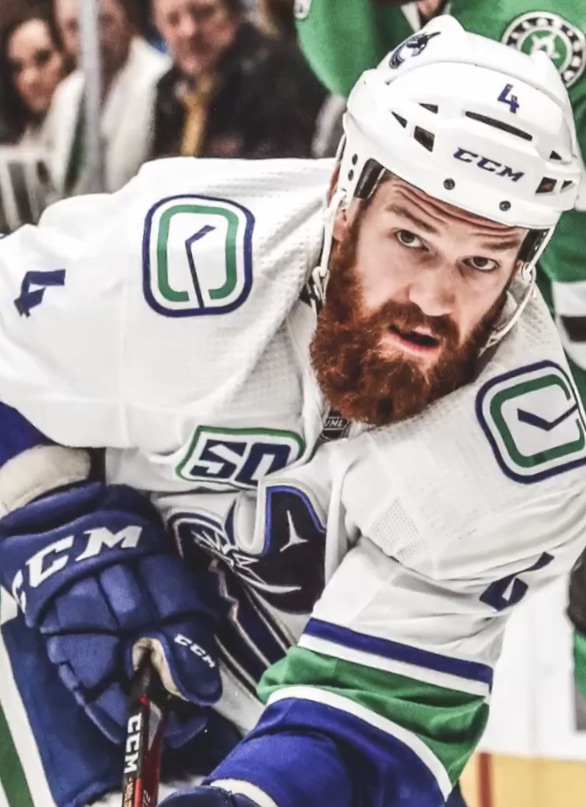
- Benn with the Vancouver Canucks in 2019
- Born: July 26, 1987 (age 39) Victoria, British Columbia, Canada
- Height: 6 ft 1 in (185 cm)
- Weight: 204 lb (93 kg; 14 st 8 lb)
- Position: Defence
- Shot: Left
- Played for: Dallas Stars; Montreal Canadiens; Vancouver Canucks; Winnipeg Jets; Minnesota Wild; Toronto Maple Leafs
- NHL draft: Undrafted
- Playing career: 2008–2024

Phillip Jordan Ellis Benn (born July 26, 1987) is a Canadian former professional ice hockey player. An undrafted defenceman, Benn played for the Dallas Stars, Montreal Canadiens, Vancouver Canucks, Winnipeg Jets, Minnesota Wild and Toronto Maple Leafs. He is the older brother of Dallas Stars captain Jamie Benn.

== Playing career ==
Undrafted, Benn played in the British Columbia Hockey League with the Victoria Grizzlies. Originally signing a letter of intent with the University of Alaska Fairbanks in 2006, Benn deferred and later opted to forgo a collegiate career to remain in Victoria and make his professional debut with the Victoria Salmon Kings of the ECHL in the 2008–09 season. With his younger brother, Jamie Benn, cementing his role as a prominent forward for the Dallas Stars, Benn secured his unconventional pathway up the ranks through the Stars' affiliates in the ECHL and American Hockey League (AHL).

=== Dallas Stars ===
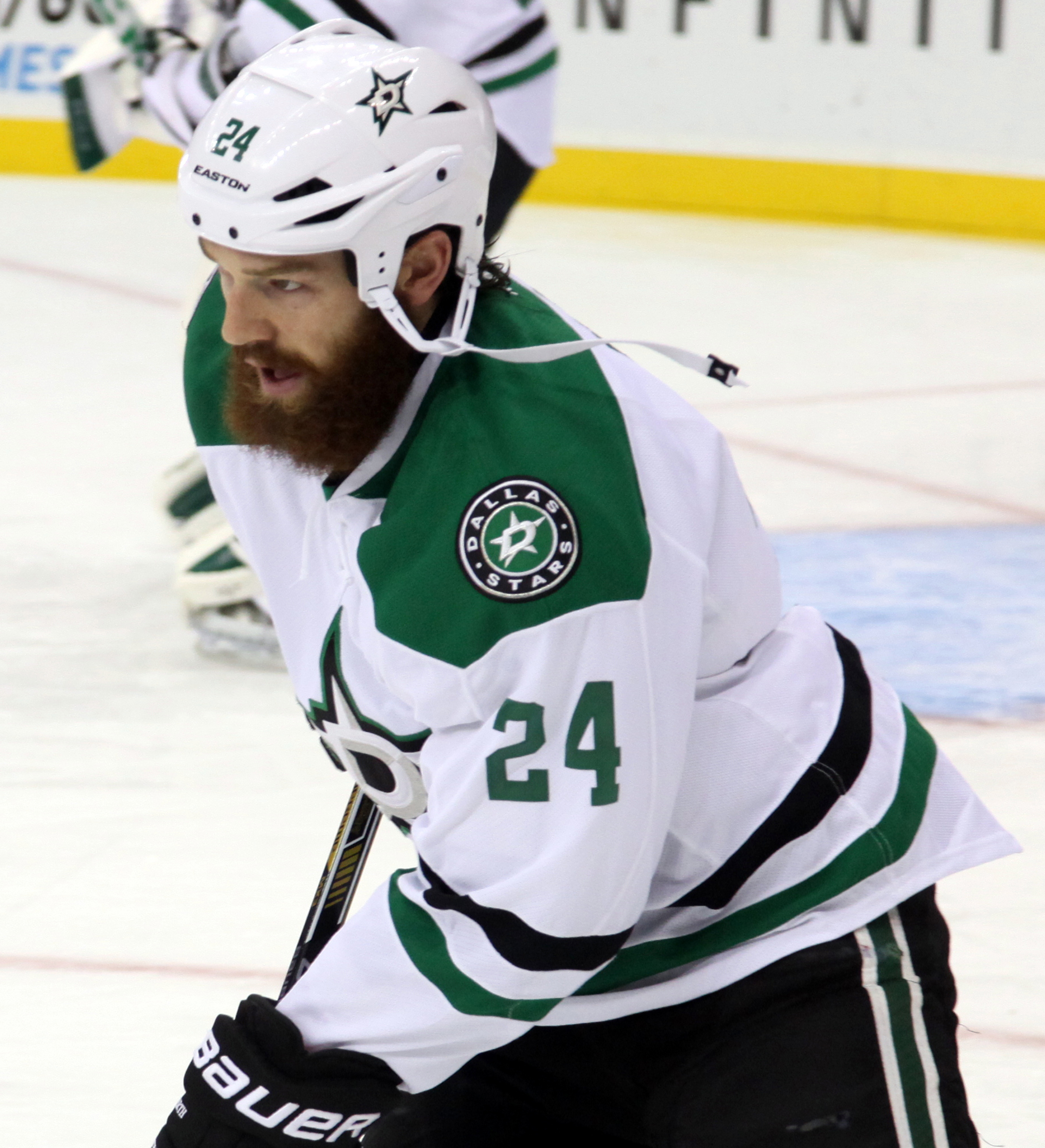
Benn with the Dallas Stars in 2014

After the 2010–11 season with the Texas Stars of the AHL, Benn signed his first NHL contract in agreeing to a one-year, two-way deal with the Dallas Stars on July 2, 2011. In the following 2011–12 season, on January 3, 2012, Benn made his NHL debut against the Detroit Red Wings. He recorded his first NHL point, also assisted on by his brother Jamie, on a goal by Loui Eriksson. As an impending free agent following the 2015–16 season, Benn opted to remain with the Stars, signing a three-year, $3.3 million contract on June 24, 2016.

=== Montreal Canadiens ===
In the midst of the 2016–17 season, Benn's tenure with the Stars came to an end after seven years, as he was traded prior to the deadline to the Montreal Canadiens in exchange for Greg Pateryn and a fourth-round draft pick in 2017 on February 27, 2017. On March 4, 2017, Benn scored his first goal with the Canadiens in a 4–1 victory against New York Rangers in Madison Square Garden.

When playing against his former team the following season against his brother, Benn said:

Obviously there's a bit of a shadow when your brother [Jamie Benn] is the superstar of the Stars," Benn said on Tuesday morning. "I never thought about it like that but obviously everybody could see it. It was nice to get away and just play my game and be myself.

=== Vancouver Canucks ===
On July 1, 2019, Benn returned to his home province, signing as a free agent to a two-year, $4 million contract with the Vancouver Canucks. On February 10, 2020, Benn scored his first goal with the Canucks in a 6–2 win over the Nashville Predators.

=== Winnipeg Jets ===
In his final year under contract with the Canucks in the 2020–21 season, Benn was dealt at the trade deadline to the Winnipeg Jets for a 2021 sixth-round pick on April 12, 2021. In the closing stages of the regular season Benn, was competing with Logan Stanley and Ville Heinola for playing time, registering one assist through eight games. He featured in three playoff contests with the Jets, before ending his tenure with the club following a second-round series defeat to the Montreal Canadiens.

=== Minnesota Wild ===
As a free agent, Benn signed a one-year, $900,000 contract to join his fifth NHL club, the Minnesota Wild, on August 27, 2021. Benn played in 39 games registering one goal and 8 points.

=== Toronto Maple Leafs ===
Again a free agent the following off-season, Benn continued his NHL journey by signing a one-year, $750,000 contract with the Toronto Maple Leafs on July 14, 2022, the second day of free agency. After missing time with a groin injury, Benn played in his first game with the Maple Leafs on November 12, scoring his first goal with the team. On November 23, Benn suffered an upper-body injury in a 2–1 win over the New Jersey Devils. He returned from injury on December 12 and made the starting lineup on December 27, 2022. On February 25, 2023, Benn was placed on waivers for the purpose of sending him to the Maple Leafs AHL affiliate, the Toronto Marlies. He finished the season playing in 12 games for the Maple Leafs, registering two points and 23 games for the Marlies, recording six points.

=== Brynäs IF and retirement ===
As an unrestricted free agent with the completion of his contract with the Maple Leafs, on August 30, 2023, Benn agreed to a professional tryout contract with returning to the Dallas Stars organization for their 2023 training camp, but he was unsuccessful in obtaining a roster slot for the 2023–24 season. He then signed a one-year contract with Brynäs IF of the second-tier Swedish league, HockeyAllsvenskan, on October 14, 2023. Following the 2023–24 season, where Brynäs IF managed to secure promotion, after winning in the playoffs, Benn announced his retirement on September 10, 2024.

== Career statistics ==
			Regular season					Playoffs
Season	Team	League	GP	G	A	Pts	PIM	GP	G	A	Pts	PIM
2003–04	Peninsula Panthers	VIJHL	9	2	3	5	2	—	—	—	—	—
2004–05	Peninsula Panthers	VIJHL	45	5	21	26	35	—	—	—	—	—
2004–05	Victoria Salsa	BCHL	4	0	1	1	6	1	0	0	0	2
2005–06	Victoria Salsa	BCHL	55	5	20	25	61	16	1	5	6	6
2006–07	Victoria Grizzlies	BCHL	53	4	37	41	62	11	1	7	8	22
2007–08	Victoria Grizzlies	BCHL	60	15	32	47	78	11	2	8	10	8
2008–09	Victoria Salmon Kings	ECHL	55	1	11	12	26	3	0	0	0	0
2009–10	Allen Americans	CHL	45	9	9	18	55	20	2	9	11	12
2010–11	Texas Stars	AHL	60	2	10	12	39	1	0	0	0	0
2011–12	Texas Stars	AHL	62	9	23	32	33	—	—	—	—	—
2011–12	Dallas Stars	NHL	3	0	2	2	0	—	—	—	—	—
2012–13	Texas Stars	AHL	43	7	14	21	33	7	0	0	0	10
2012–13	Dallas Stars	NHL	26	1	5	6	10	—	—	—	—	—
2013–14	Dallas Stars	NHL	78	3	17	20	30	6	0	3	3	2
2014–15	Dallas Stars	NHL	73	2	14	16	34	—	—	—	—	—
2015–16	Dallas Stars	NHL	64	3	9	12	21	1	0	0	0	4
2016–17	Dallas Stars	NHL	58	2	13	15	24	—	—	—	—	—
2016–17	Montreal Canadiens	NHL	13	2	0	2	4	6	0	0	0	6
2017–18	Montreal Canadiens	NHL	77	4	11	15	34	—	—	—	—	—
2018–19	Montreal Canadiens	NHL	81	5	17	22	39	—	—	—	—	—
2019–20	Vancouver Canucks	NHL	44	1	6	7	17	7	0	0	0	0
2020–21	Vancouver Canucks	NHL	31	1	8	9	9	—	—	—	—	—
2020–21	Winnipeg Jets	NHL	8	0	1	1	0	3	0	1	1	0
2021–22	Minnesota Wild	NHL	39	1	7	8	10	—	—	—	—	—
2022–23	Toronto Marlies	AHL	23	2	4	6	14	7	0	3	3	0
2022–23	Toronto Maple Leafs	NHL	12	1	1	2	12	—	—	—	—	—
2023–24	Brynäs IF	Allsv	39	3	19	22	16	13	1	6	7	10
NHL totals			607	26	111	137	244	23	0	4	4	12
