= Matt Irwin =

Canadian ice hockey player (born 1987)

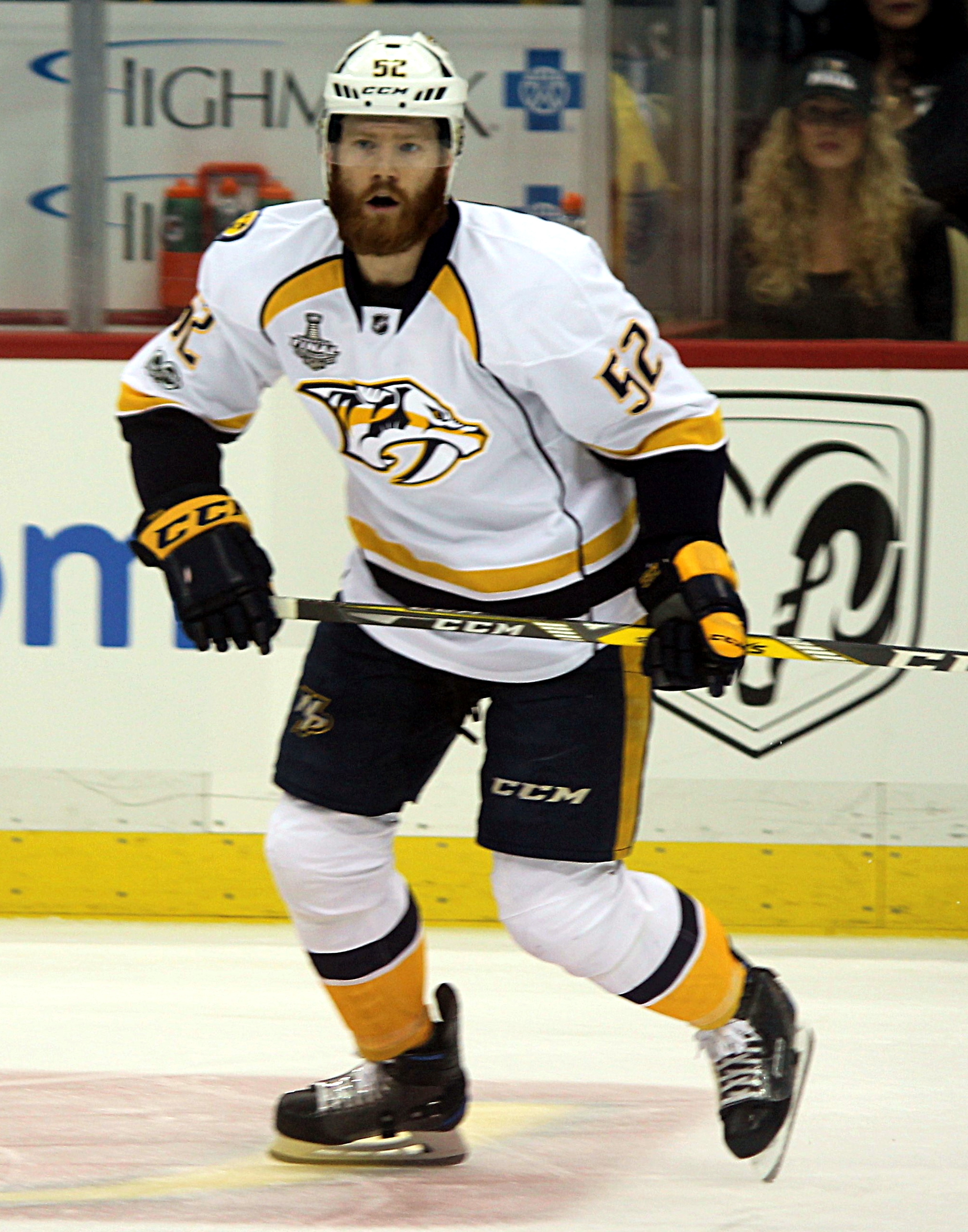
- Irwin with the Nashville Predators in 2017
- Born: November 29, 1987 (age 38) Victoria, British Columbia, Canada
- Height: 6 ft 1 in (185 cm)
- Weight: 207 lb (94 kg; 14 st 11 lb)
- Position: Defense
- Shot: Left
- Played for: San Jose Sharks; Boston Bruins; Nashville Predators; Anaheim Ducks; Buffalo Sabres; Washington Capitals
- NHL draft: Undrafted
- Playing career: 2010–2024

Matthew Irwin (born November 29, 1987) is a Canadian former professional ice hockey defenseman. Irwin played in the National Hockey League (NHL) for the San Jose Sharks, Boston Bruins, Nashville Predators, Anaheim Ducks, Buffalo Sabres and the Washington Capitals.

== Playing career ==
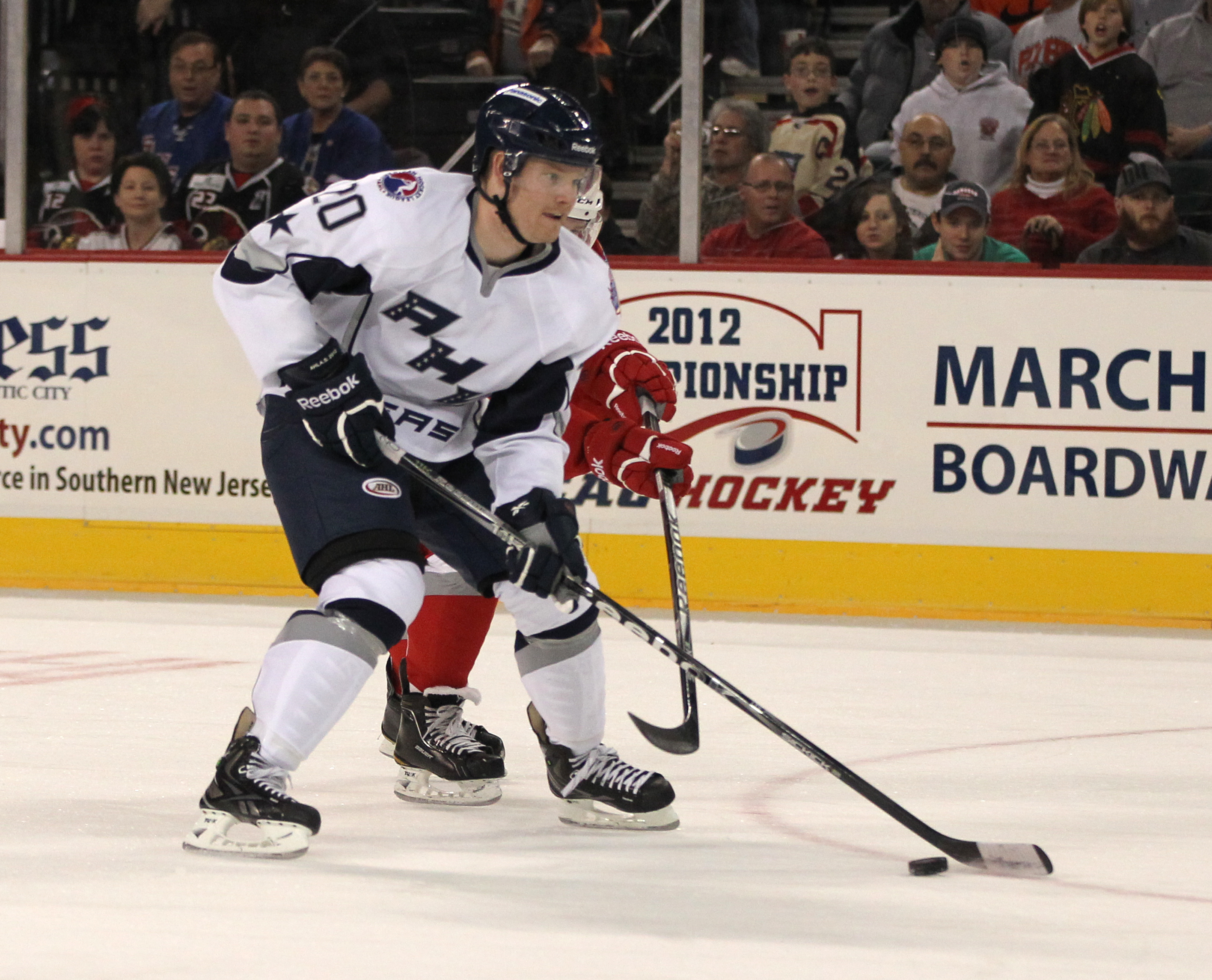
Irwin during the AHL All-Star Game in 2012

=== Amateur ===
He was named best defenceman in the British Columbia Hockey League Coastal Conference two years in a row, 2007 and 2008, while playing for the Nanaimo Clippers. He continued his career playing at the college level for the UMass Minutemen of Hockey East.

=== Professional ===
==== San Jose Sharks ====
As an undrafted free agent, Irwin agreed to a contract with the Worcester Sharks of the AHL. Irwin scored 73 points in his first two seasons, and was signed by parent affiliate, the San Jose Sharks after injuries to Jason Demers and Brent Burns.

Irwin scored his first NHL goal on January 26, 2013 against Semyon Varlamov of the Colorado Avalanche. In 38 games with the Sharks in 2013, Irwin scored six goals and six assists, while averaging 2.1 shots on goal per game, the most by a rookie defenceman.

On April 3, 2013, Irwin signed a two-year, $2 million contract extension with the Sharks.

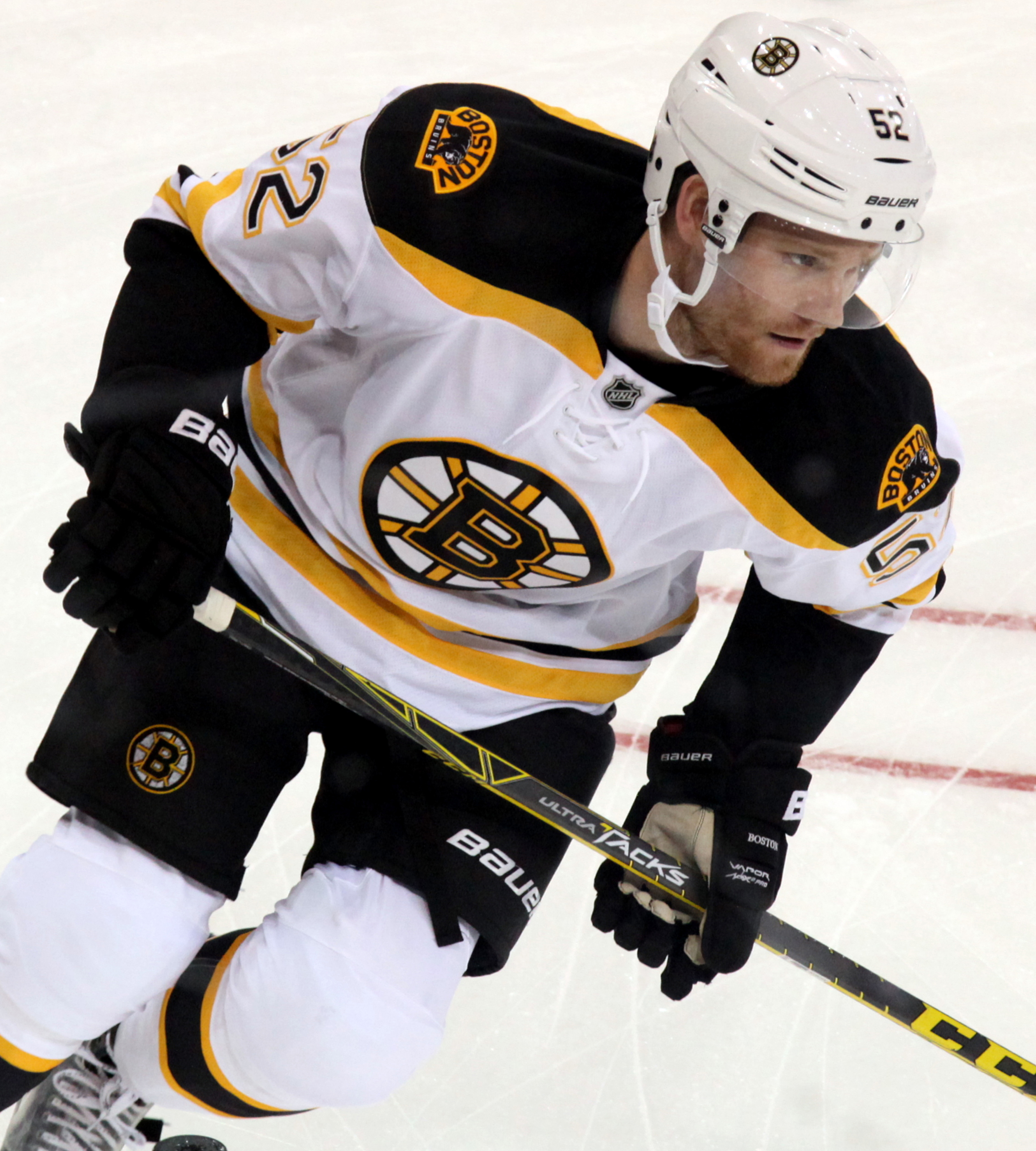
Irwin during his time with the Bruins

==== Boston Bruins ====
On July 10, 2015, Irwin signed a one-year, $800,000 contract with the Boston Bruins. Irwin made the opening-night roster with Boston for the 2015–16 season. On October 11, 2015, Irwin was waived by Boston after a -5 plus/minus in his first two games. He was reassigned to Boston's AHL affiliate, the Providence Bruins, the following day.

==== Nashville Predators ====
On July 1, 2016, having concluded his contract with the Bruins, Irwin left as a free agent to sign a one-year, two-way contract worth $575,000 with the Nashville Predators. After a few months with the team, Irwin was signed to a one-year, $650,000 contract extension. Irwin spent majority of the season with the Predators, recording 14 points in 74 games. Irwin also appeared in 22 games for the team during the 2017 playoffs, where the Predators fell in six games to the Pittsburgh Penguins during the 2017 Stanley Cup Finals.

On January 9, 2018, the Predators re-signed Irwin to a two-year, $1.35 million contract extension.

==== Anaheim Ducks ====
On February 24, 2020, after making 27 appearances with the Predators, Irwin was dealt to the Ducks in exchange for Korbinian Holzer, along with a 2022 sixth-round pick. Irwin featured in 9 games on the Ducks blueline, registering 1 assist, before the season was paused and effectively ended for the Ducks due to the COVID-19 pandemic.

==== Buffalo Sabres ====
As a free agent from the Ducks, Irwin agreed to a one-year, $700,000 contract to join his fifth NHL club in the Buffalo Sabres on October 9, 2020. In the pandemic delayed 2020–21 season, Irwin made 24 regular season appearances on the blueline for the cellar-dwelling Sabres, registering just 2 assists.

==== Washington Capitals ====
Irwin continued his journeyman career in the following off-season, leaving the Sabres to sign as a free agent on a one-year, two-way contract with the Washington Capitals on July 28, 2021.

==== Vancouver Canucks organization and retirement ====
Following two seasons with the Capitals, Irwin left as a free agent and was signed to a one-year, two-way contract with the Vancouver Canucks on July 1, 2023. In his lone season within the Canucks organization, Irwin played exclusively in the AHL with the Abbotsford Canucks, registering 16 points through 65 appearances.

Remaining un-signed into the 2024–25 season, Irwin announced his retirement from professional hockey on November 14, 2024.

== Career statistics ==
			Regular season					Playoffs
Season	Team	League	GP	G	A	Pts	PIM	GP	G	A	Pts	PIM
2004–05	Saanich Braves	VIJHL	46	7	10	17	74	—	—	—	—	—
2004–05	Nanaimo Clippers	BCHL	3	0	0	0	2	—	—	—	—	—
2005–06	Nanaimo Clippers	BCHL	56	3	6	9	41	5	0	1	1	4
2006–07	Nanaimo Clippers	BCHL	60	22	27	49	67	24	10	4	14	18
2007–08	Nanaimo Clippers	BCHL	59	16	37	53	40	14	6	7	13	22
2008–09	UMass Minutemen	HE	31	7	11	18	8	—	—	—	—	—
2009–10	UMass Minutemen	HE	36	7	17	24	16	—	—	—	—	—
2009–10	Worcester Sharks	AHL	3	0	0	0	2	1	0	0	0	0
2010–11	Worcester Sharks	AHL	72	10	21	31	43	—	—	—	—	—
2011–12	Worcester Sharks	AHL	71	11	31	42	48	—	—	—	—	—
2012–13	Worcester Sharks	AHL	35	1	14	15	26	—	—	—	—	—
2012–13	San Jose Sharks	NHL	38	6	6	12	10	11	0	1	1	10
2013–14	San Jose Sharks	NHL	62	2	17	19	35	2	1	0	1	0
2014–15	San Jose Sharks	NHL	51	8	11	19	18	—	—	—	—	—
2015–16	Boston Bruins	NHL	2	0	0	0	0	—	—	—	—	—
2015–16	Providence Bruins	AHL	64	5	25	30	27	2	0	0	0	0
2016–17	Milwaukee Admirals	AHL	4	0	1	1	4	—	—	—	—	—
2016–17	Nashville Predators	NHL	74	3	11	14	26	22	0	2	2	4
2017–18	Nashville Predators	NHL	50	2	6	8	8	12	0	0	0	2
2018–19	Nashville Predators	NHL	44	1	6	7	38	—	—	—	—	—
2019–20	Nashville Predators	NHL	27	0	2	2	11	—	—	—	—	—
2019–20	Anaheim Ducks	NHL	9	0	1	1	4	—	—	—	—	—
2020–21	Buffalo Sabres	NHL	24	0	2	2	19	—	—	—	—	—
2021–22	Washington Capitals	NHL	17	1	3	4	6	—	—	—	—	—
2022–23	Washington Capitals	NHL	61	2	3	5	36	—	—	—	—	—
2023–24	Abbotsford Canucks	AHL	65	5	11	16	33	6	0	0	0	6
NHL totals			461	25	68	93	211	47	1	3	4	10

== Awards and honours ==
Award	Year
BCHL
Coastal Best Defenseman	2007, 2008
College
HE All-Academic Team	2010
AHL
All-Star Game	2012
