= Nanaimo Buccaneers =

- City: Nanaimo, British Columbia
- League: Vancouver Island Junior Hockey League
- Division: North Division
- Founded: 2012-13
- Home arena: Nanaimo Ice Centre (capacity: 400)
- Colours: Yellow, Black, White
- General manager: Bill Bestwick
- Head coach: Tyler Gow
- Asst. coaches: Marcus Beesly; Brett Bestwick
- Website: www.buccaneers.vijhl.com Official Website

Franchise history
- 2012-present: Nanaimo Buccaneers

The Nanaimo Buccaneers are a junior ice hockey team based in Nanaimo, British Columbia. The original Buccaneers were founded and owned by Cliff McNabb, and Jimmy Dawes in 1966-67. They play in the North Division of the Vancouver Island Junior Hockey League. They were one of two expansion teams in 2012 in the VIJHL returning to the league after 30+ years (the other being the Westshore Wolves), and play their home games at the Nanaimo Ice Centre (Rink #1).

== History ==
The current Buccaneers franchise was founded as an expansion team in 2012 along with the Westshore Wolves by Brenda and Phil Levesque. However there was a former Buccaneers franchise founded by Cliff McNabb that operated in the 1960’s. They finished first in the North Division in their first season (2012–13) with 58 points in 48 games, losing in the second round of the playoffs. The following year they finished third in the division, losing in the first round. They finished third again in 2014-15, and lost again in the first round. The 2015/16, 2016/17, 2017/18 & 2018/19 proved to be good years for the Buccaneers having strong regular seasons but not advancing through the second round in the playoffs. After the 2017/18 season the team was sold to Clayton Robinson. 2019/20 was a tough year for the Bucs finishing third in the division and losing in the first round. After the 2019/20 season the team was sold to Carl Ollech. The next couple seasons were short due to the COVID pandemic. After things got back to the normal in the world the Buccaneers went through five very hard seasons two of which the team only had one win the entire season. After the 2021/22 season the team was sold to Nicole Brandenburg. After the first two seasons under her ownership the team hired well known local hockey coach Bill Bestwick as Head Coach and General Manager. Many Nanaimo hockey fans remembered Bill from his time coaching the Nanaimo Clippers. The team improved finishing in 3rd place in the North division but still failing to make the playoffs. After the season Bestwick moved into the General Manager position full time and moving Tyler Gow up to the Head Coach position. The team improved significantly the following season under the hockey leadership of Bestwick and Gow finishing 1st in the North Division and 4th in the league overall, making the playoffs for the first time in six seasons. In the first round Nanaimo took care of business beating the Campbell River Storm in a 4-0 series sweep. Three of the games Nanaimo shutout the Storm. Moving onto the second round the Bucs faced off against the Comox Valley Glacier Kings beating them 4 games to 2, and advancing to the VIJHL final for the first time in franchise history against the Victoria Cougars. Unfortunately after winning the first game of the series the Bucs would go on to lose the next 4. The future looks bright for the Bucs under Head Coach Tyler Gow & assistant coach Brett Bestwick and veteran leadership under General Manager Bill Bestwick, the Bucs will look to improve the next season on their quest for their first championship.

== Season-by-season record ==
Note: GP - Games Played, W - Wins, L - Losses, T - Ties, OTL - Overtime Losses, Pts - Points, GF - Goals for, GA - Goals against

Accurate as of 19 February 2018.

Season	GP	W	L	T	OTL	Pts	GF	GA	Finish	Playoffs
2012-13	48	27	17	0	4	58	167	150	1st, North	Lost in division final (Comox Valley)
2013-14	48	25	19	2	2	54	171	157	3rd, North	Lost in first round (Campbell River)
2014-15	48	22	18	3	5	52	191	196	3rd, North	Lost in first round (Comox Valley)
2015-16	48	22	21	1	4	49	166	162	2nd, North	Lost in division final 0-4 (Campbell River)
2016-17	48	31	16	0	1	63	186	136	2nd of 4 North; 3rd of 9 VIJHL	Lost in division final 1-4 (Campbell River)
2017-18	48	37	9	0	2	76	214	136	2nd of 4 North; 2nd of 9 VIJHL	Won div. quarterfinal 4-0 (Oceanside); Lost Div Semifinals 3-4 (Braves)
2018-19	48	26	18	2	2	84	175	130	2nd of 4 North; 3rd of 9 VIJHL	Won div. quarterfinal 4-1 (Wolves); Lost Div Semifinals 2-4 (Cougars)
2019-20	48	14	28	0	6	132	164	34	3rd of 4 North; 7th of 9 VIJHL	Lost quarterfinals, 2-4 (Storm)
2020-21	12	3	9	0	0	22	71	6		Remaining season and playoffs lost due to COVID-19
2021-22	48	1	43	0	4	94	328	5	6th of 6 North; 11th of 11 VIJHL	Did Not QUALIFY
2022-23	48	5	41	1	1	82	244	12	6th of 6 North; 11th of 11 VIJHL	Did Not QUALIFY
2023-24	48	1	47	0	0	77	330	2	6th of 6 North; 11th of 11 VIJHL	Did Not QUALIFY
2024-25	48	16	26	4	2	136	183	38	5th of 6 North; 9th of 11 VIJHL	Did Not QUALIFY
2025-26	48	33	13	2	0	197	138	68	1st of 6 North; 4th of 11 VIJHL	Won Div. Semifinal 4-0, (Storm); Won Div. Finals. 4-2 (Glacier Kings); Lost League Finals, 1-4 (Cougars}

== Playoffs ==
Accurate as of 29 April 2018.

Season	1st round	2nd round	Finals
2012-13	W, 4-0, Kerry Park	L, 2-4, Comox Valley	-
2013-14	L, 2-4, Campbell River	-	-
2014-15	L, 1-4, Comox Valley	-	-
2015-16	W, 4-0, Comox Valley	L, 0-4, Campbell River	-
2016-17	W, 4-1, Comox Valley	L, 1-4, Campbell River	-
2017-18	W, 4-0, Oceanside	L, 3-4, Saanich	-
