= Saanich Predators =

Canadian junior ice hockey team, based in Saanich, BC

- City: Saanich, British Columbia
- League: VIJHL
- Division: South
- Founded: 1967
- Home arena: George Pearkes Arena
- Colours: Black, Teal, Silver, White
- Owners: Ed Geric and Norm Kelly
- General manager: Cody Carlson
- Head coach: Cody Carlson
- Website: saanichpreds.com

Franchise history
- 1967-2020: Saanich Braves
- 2020-present: Saanich Predators

The Saanich Predators are a Junior ice hockey team based in Saanich, British Columbia, Canada. They are members of the South Division of the Vancouver Island Junior Hockey League (VIJHL). The team changed its name from the Saanich Braves in 2020. They play their home games at George Pearkes Arena.

== History ==
The Braves joined the league in 1967 as an original VIJHL team. In its VIJHL history, the team has won the Cyclone Taylor Cup once, in 1976. The Braves have won the Brent Patterson Memorial Trophy seven times; in 1976, 1978, 1979, 1980, 1984, 1988, and 1996. They won the Andy Hebenton Trophy ten times, as the team with the league's best regular season record in 1975, 1976, 1977, 1978, 1979, 1983, 1987, 1994, 1995, and 1996. The team changed its name from the Saanich Braves to the Saanich Predators in 2020.

== Season-by-season record ==
Note: GP = Games played, W = Wins, L = Losses, T = Ties, OTL = Overtime Losses, Pts = Points, GF = Goals for, GA = Goals against

Season	GP	W	L	T	OTL	Pts	GF	GA	Finish	Playoffs
1999–00	40	6	31	3	-	15	160	268	4th, South	
2000–01	48	3	43	2	-	8	127	317	4th, South	Lost in Division Semifinals, 2-3 (Panthers)
2001–02	48	14	29	5	-	33	173	255	4th, South	Lost in Division Semifinals, 0-3 (Panthers)
2002–03	42	10	29	3	-	23	107	227	3rd, South	Lost in Division Semifinals, 1-4 (Panthers)
2003–04	45	15	27	3	-	33			3rd, South	Lost in Division Semifinals, 1-4 (Cougars)
2004-05	48	19	27	-	1	39	148	184	4th, South	Lost in Division Semifinals, 2-4 (Panthers)
2005-06	42	29	12	-	1	59	227	136	3rd, South	Lost in Division Finals, 1-4 (Islanders)
2006-07	48	18	27	-	2	38	178	230	3rd, South	
2007-08	48	14	33	-	1	29	140	200	3rd, South	
2008-09	48	17	26	-	5	39	144	184	3rd, South	
2009-10	48	26	19	-	3	59	184	161	3rd, South	Lost Division Semifinals, 3-4 (Cougars)
2010–11	44	15	23	-	6	36	132	170	3rd, South	Lost quarterfinals, 2-3 (Glacier Kings)
2011-12	42	21	15	-	6	48	177	149	2nd, South	Won quarterfinals, 4-2 (Storm); Lost semifinals, 3-4 (Panthers)
2012-13	48	30	14	-	4	64	181	140	2nd, South	Won quarterfinals, 4-2 (Glacier Kings); Lost semifinals, 3-4 (Panthers)
2013-14	48	11	34	1	2	25	112	227	5th, South	Lost quarterfinals, 0-4 (Glacier Kings)
2014-15	48	17	25	1	5	40	141	180	3rd, South	Lost div semi-finals, 2-4 (Wolves)
2015-16	48	12	29	2	5	31	133	203	5th, South	Won Wildcard Game 3-2 (Generals); Lost quarterfinals 2-4 (Storm)
2016-17	48	29	15	1	3	62	191	147	2 of 5 Sou; 4 of 9 VIJHL	Lost div semi-finals, 2-4 (Islanders)
2017-18	48	26	17	2	3	57	188	140	1 of 5 Sou; 3 of 9 VIJHL	Won quarterfinals, 4-1 (Islanders); Won semifinals, 4-3 (Buccaneers); Lost League Finals 3-4 (Storm)
2018-19	48	21	17	4	6	77	170	158	3 of 5 Sou; 5 of 9 VIJHL	Won quarterfinals, 4-2 (Islanders); Lost semifinals 0-4 (Storm)
2019-20	48	20	21	0	7	167	192	47	4th of 5 South; 6th of 9 VIJHL	Lost quarterfinals, 0-4 (Cougars)
SAANICH PREDATORS
2020-21	12	4	6	1	1	36	37	10		Remaining season and playoffs lost due to COVID-19
2021-22	52	16	35	0	1	152	253	33	5th of 5 South; 10th of 11 VIJHL	Did not qualify
2022-23	48	26	13	5	4	169	147	61	2nd of 5 South; 5th of 11 VIJHL	Won quarterfinals, 4-2 (Panthers); Won semifinals, 4-2 (Cougars); Lost Finals, 2-4 (Generals)
2023-24	48	33	13	1	1	225	164	68	2nd of 5 South; 3rd of 11 VIJHL	Won Div. semifinals, 4-1(Wolves); Won Div. Finals, 4-3 (Cougars); Won League Finals, 4-1 (Islanders); League champions
2024-25	48	10	35	3	0	135	223	23	5th of 5 South; 11th of 11 VIJHL	Did not qualify
2025-26	48	3	35	3	0	138	240	21	4th of 5 South; 10th of 11 VIJHL	Lost Div. semifinals, 0-4(Panthers)

== British Columbia Jr B Provincial Championships ==
Season	Round Robin	Record	Standing	Bronze Medal Game	Gold Medal Game
2024	Lost, Revelstoke Grizzlies 4-7; Lost, Kimberley Dynamiters 0-4; Lost, Ridge Meadows Flames 2-5	0-3-0	4th of 4	Won - 3-0; Kimberley Dynamiters; Bronze Medalists	n/a

== NHL alumni ==
- Adam Cracknell
- Matt Irwin

== Awards and trophies ==
Cyclone Taylor Cup

- 1975-76

Brent Patterson Memorial Trophy
VIJHL Championship

- 1975-76, 1977–78, 1978–79, 1979–80, 1983–84, 1987–88, 1995–96

Andy Hebenton Trophy
Regular Season Champion

- 1974-75, 1975–76, 1976–77, 1977–78, 1978–79, 1982–83, 1986–87, 1993–94, 1994–95, 1995–96

Grant Peart Memorial Trophy
Least Penalized Team

- 1980-81, 1989–90, 1990–91, 1991–92, 1992–93, 2001–02

Doug Morton Trophy
Leading Scorer

- Rob Coldwell: 1974-75
- Mike Jones: 1986-87
- Garry Elander: 1987-88
- Spencer Goodson: 1994-95
- Mark Johnston: 1997-98
- Ty Jones: 2010-11

Jamie Robertson Trophy
Most Sportsmanlike Player

- Mike Shemilt: 1975-76
- Murray McLaren: 1976-77
- Craig Eversfield: 1981-82
- Roy Clark: 1990-91
- Roy Clark: 1991-92
- 1994-95
- Dean Golbeck: 1996-97
- Trevor Yee: 2008-09

Jamie Benn Trophy
League Most Valuable Player

- Ty Jones: 2010-11

Larry Lamoureaux Trophy
Rookie of the Year

- Spencer Goodson: 1994-95
- A.J. Gale: 2002-03
- Ty Jones: 2008-09
- Jack Palmer: 2010-11

Ray's Sports Centre Trophy
Top Goaltender

- Steve Hanna: 1974-75
- Mike Duch: 1975-76
- Mike Duch: 1976-77
- Steve Hanna: 1977-78
- Marty Wakelyn: 1978-79
- Alf Orton: 1982-83
- Shon Hunter: 1986-87
- Jacob Matychuk: 1992-93
- 1993-94
- Tanner McGaw: 2011-12

Walt McWilliams Memorial Trophy
Unsung Hero

- Steve McKenzie: 1985-86
- Ed Pratt: 1987-88
- Norm Westhaver: 1988-89
