= Peninsula Panthers =

Junior ice hockey team

- City: North Saanich, British Columbia
- League: Vancouver Island Junior Hockey League
- Division: South
- Home arena: Panorama Recreation Centre
- Colours: Black, blue, red, white
- Owners: Richard Murphy; Annie Murphy; Madelyn Murphy-Homer; Ryan Murphy
- General manager: Tyler Stanton
- Head coach: Tyler Stanton
- Affiliates: Peninsula Eagles MHA Trail Smoke Eaters
- Website: panthers-hockey.com

Franchise history
- 1996–1997: Esquimalt Panthers

The Peninsula Panthers are a junior ice hockey team based in North Saanich, British Columbia. They are members of the South Division of the Vancouver Island Junior Hockey League (VIJHL). The Panthers play their home games at Panorama Recreation Centre.

== History ==
The Peninsula Panthers joined the league as an expansion team in 1996, as the Esquimalt Panthers (playing out of the Naden Arena). After one season in Esquimalt, the franchise moved to North Saanich. The team has won the Cyclone Taylor Cup once, in 2011. The Panthers have won the league championship Brent Patterson Memorial Trophy five times: in 1989, 2010, 2011, 2022 and 2025. They won the Andy Hebenton Trophy five times, as the team with the league's best regular season record in 1988, 1989, 2004, 2008 and 2009.

== Season-by-season record ==
Season	GP	W	L	T	OTL	Pts	GF	GA	Finish	Playoffs
1999-00	40	23	15	2	-	48	241	185	2nd, South	Lost League Finals, 2-4 (Storm)
2000-01	46	25	13	8	-	58	233	169	1st, South	Lost division finals, 2-4 (Islanders)
2001-02	48	34	10	4	-	72	264	173	1st, South	Lost Finals, 1-4 (Storm)
2002-03	44	24	20	0	-	48	158	143	2nd, South	Lost division finals, 2-3 (Cougars)
2003-04	45	31	10	4	-	66			1st, South	Lost Finals, 0-3 (Storm)
2004-05	48	35	9		2	72	254	159	1st, South	
2005-06	42	26	15		0	52	189	146	4th, South	Lost Division Semifinals, 3-4 (Islanders)
2006-07	48	22	23		3	47	168	183	2nd, South	Lost division finals, Victoria Cougars 4-1
2007-08	48	28	18		1	57	204	155	2nd, South	
2008-09	48	35	8		5	75	226	140	1st, South	
2009-10	48	38	6		4	80	209	100	1st, South	Brent Patterson Memorial; Trophy Champions
2010-11	44	33	10		1	67	200	111	2nd, South	Brent Patterson Memorial; Trophy Champions - 4-3 (Cougars); Cyclone Taylor Cup Champions
2011-12	42	17	21		4	38	155	194	3rd, South	Won quarterfinals, 4-2 (Generals); Won semifinals, 4-3 (Braves) lost FINALS, 0-4 (Cougars)
2012-13	48	22	23		3	47	151	186	4th, South	Lost quarterfinals, 1-4 (Cougars)
2013-14	48	30	13	2	3	65	207	153	2nd, South	Won quarterfinals, 4-2 (Wolves); Won semifinals, 4-3 (Glacier Kings) lost FINALS, 2-4 (Cougars)
2014-15	48	15	31		2	32	130	203	5th, South	Lost wildcard game, 2-5 - (Generals)
2015-16	48	22	21	1	4	49	151	173	2nd, South	Won Div Semifinals, 4-2 (Wolves); Lost Div. Finals 0-4 (Cougars)
2016-17	48	9	36	0	3	21	127	258	5th of 5 South; 9th of 9 VIJHL	Won wildcard game, 3-1 (Generals); Lost div. semi-final, 0-4 (Storm)
2017-18	48	20	27	0	1	41	139	195	5th of 5 South; 8th of 9 VIJHL	Lost quarterfinals, 1-4 (Storm)
2018-19	48	14	25	4	5	55	127	176	5th of 5 South; 8th of 9 VIJHL	Lost quarterfinals, 3-4 (Storm)
2019-20	48	35	13	0	0	70	219	126	2nd of 5 South; 2nd of 9 VIJHL	Won quarterfinals, 4-1 (Wolves); Div. Semifinal, 0-2 (Cougars) Cancelled due to COVID-19
2020-21	12	3	9	0	0	6	30	49	5th of 5 South; 8th of 9 VIJHL	Season cancelled after 12 games due to COVID-19
2021-22	51	31	14	0	6	68	242	178	2nd of 5 South; 4th of 11 VIJHL	Won quarterfinals, 4-2 (Wolves); Won Div. Final, 4-2 (Islanders); Won League Finals, 4-2 (Generals); VIJHL CHAMPIONS advance to Cyclone Taylor Cup
2022-23	48	25	17	5	1	56	154	160	3rd of 5 South; 6th of 11 VIJHL	Lost quarterfinals, 2-4 (Predators)
2023-24	48	23	23	1	1	48	136	144	5th of 5 South; 8th of 11 VIJHL	Lost quarterfinals, 0-4 (Cougars)
2024-25	48	33	11	3	1	70	191	135	2nd of 5 South; 2nd of 11 VIJHL	Won quarterfinals, 4-1 (Wolves); Won Div. Final, 4-0 (Islanders); Won League Finals, 4-3 (Storm); VIJHL CHAMPIONS
2025-26	48	38	7	3	0	79	272	113	1st of 5 South; 1st of 11 VIJHL	Won Div Semifinal, 4- 0 (Predators); Lost Div Finals 3-4 (Cougars)

== Cyclone Taylor Cup ==
British Columbia Jr B Provincial Championships

- Campbell River VIJHL Champs and Cyclone Taylor "Host". Therefore, Panthers to Cyclone Taylor Cup as VIJHL reps.

Season	Round Robin	Record	Standing	Bronze Medal Game	Gold Medal Game
2004**	?, Richmond Sockeyes ?-? ?, Nelson Leafs ?-? ?, Beaver Valley Nitehawks ?-?	?-?-?	? of 4	W, Beaver Valley Nitehawks ?-? Bronze Medal	n/a
2010	?, Revelstoke Grizzlies ?-? ?, Aldergrove Kodiaks ?-? ?, Oceanside Generals ?-?	?-?-?	? of 4	n/a	L, Revelstoke Grizzlies 1-4; Silver Medal
2011	T, Fernie Ghostriders 3-3; W, Richmond Sockeyes 6-4; T, Osoyoos Coyotes 6-6	1-0-2	2nd of 4	n/a	W, Fernie Ghostriders 5-3; GOLD Medal
2022	L, Langley Trappers 2-6; L, Delta Ice Hawks 7-8; L, Revelstoke Grizzlies 1-2(so)	0-2-1	4th of 4	L, Revelstoke Grizzlies 2-3	-

== Keystone Cup ==
Western Canadian Jr. B Championships(Northern Ontario to British Columbia)
Six teams in round robin play. 1st vs 2nd for gold/silver & 3rd vs. 4th for bronze.

Season	Round Robin	Record	Standing	Bronze Medal Game	Gold Medal Game
2011	W, 1-0 Pilot Butte Storm; L, 2-6 Sherwood Park Crusaders; L, 6-7 Blackfalds Wranglers; W, 13-1 Thunder Bay Northern Hawks; W, 8-3 Arborg Ice Dawgs	3-2-0	3rd of 6	L, 3-5 Pilot Butte Storm	n/a

== NHL alumni ==
- Jamie Benn
- Ryan O'Byrne
- Taylor Ellington
- Greg Scott
- Kyle Greentree
- Mike Hamilton
- Jordie Benn

== Awards and trophies ==
Cyclone Taylor Cup

- 2010-11

Brent Patterson Memorial Trophy
VIJHL Championship

- 1988–89, 2009–10, 2010–11, 2021-22

Andy Hebenton Trophy
Regular Season Champion

- 1987–88, 1988–89, 2003–04, 2007–08, 2008–09

Grant Peart Memorial Trophy
Least Penalized Team

- 1988–89, 1998–99, 2019–20, 2021-22

Jaime Benn Trophy
Most Valuable Player

- Tanner Wort: 2019-20 (86pts: 42g 44a)
- Riley Braun: 2021-22 (120pts: 43g 77a)

Doug Morton Trophy
Leading Scorer

- Greg Wagnor: 1988-89
- Aaron Lloyd: 1996-97
- Daniel Bell: 2007-08 (64pts: 28g 36a)
- Daniel Bell: 2008-09 (78pts: 32g 46a)
- Evan Campbell: 2010-11 (87pts: 37g 50a)
- Tanner Wort: 2019-20 (86pts: 42g 44a)
- Riley Braun: 2021-22 (120pts: 43g 77a)

Jack Kingston Memorial Trophy
Top Defenceman

- Mike Scarborough: 2009-10 (24pts: 3g 21a)
- Matthew Seale: 2021-22 (52pts: 10g 42a)

Jamie Robertson Trophy
Most Sportsmanlike Player

- Greg Wagnor: 1987-88
- Rob Olson: 1988-89
- Gerry Baron: 1990-91
- Craig Zubersky: 1998-99
- Paul Lowden: 2002-03
- Riley Braun: 2019-20

Larry Lamoureaux Trophy
Rookie of the Year

- Jamie Benn: 2005-06 (55pts: 21g 34a)
- Payton Braun: 2021-22 (84pts: 41g 43a)

Ray's Sports Centre Trophy
Top Goaltender

- Grant Sjerven: 1987-88
- Corey Volk: 1989-90
- Scott Ismond: 2006-07
- Andrew Wilson: 2007-08
- Brady Berisoff: 2008-09

Walt McWilliams Memorial Trophy
Unsung Hero

- Dan Lapointe: 1999-00
- Jared Molnar: 2004-05
- Gregory Simpson: 2006-07
- Logan Spiers: 2021-22 (103pts: 36g 67a)

Eddie Kingston Award
Coach of the Year

- Brad Tippett: 2021-22

Most Points in a VIJHL Postseason

- Riley Braun: 2021-22 (36pts: 11g 25a)
