= Victoria Cougars (VIJHL) =

Junior ice hockey team

- City: Esquimalt
- League: Vancouver Island Junior Hockey League
- Division: South
- Founded: 1998–99
- Home arena: Archie Browning Arena
- Colours: Red; Yellow; Black
- General manager: Mike Vandekamp
- Head coach: Mike Vandekamp
- Website: victoriacougars.com

Franchise history
- 1998–present: Victoria Cougars

Championships
- Playoff championships: Brent Patterson Memorial Trophy (VIJHL) – 2005, 2007, 2008, 2012, 2013, 2014, 2016, 2019; Cyclone Taylor Cup – 2007

The Victoria Cougars are a junior ice hockey team based in Victoria, British Columbia, Canada. They are members of the South Division of the Vancouver Island Junior Hockey League (VIJHL). The Cougars play their home games at Archie Browning Arena in Esquimalt.

The Cougars joined the league in 1998 as an expansion team. In its VIJHL history, the team has won the Cyclone Taylor Cup once, in 2007. The Cougars have won the Brent Patterson Memorial Trophy Eight times in 2005, 2007, 2008, 2012, 2013, 2014, 2016 and 2019 as league Playoff Champions. They have also won the Andy Hebenton Trophy nine times, as the team with the league's best regular season record in 2007–08, 2010–11, 2011–12, 2012–13, 2013–14, 2014–15, 2015–16, 2016–17, and 2019–2020.

== History ==
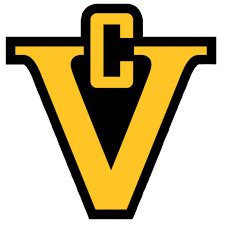
Original emblem of the Victoria Cougars.

In March 2005, the Victoria Cougars won their first Brent Patterson Memorial Trophy, and won the bronze medal at the Cyclone Taylor Cup provincial championships.

They followed that up with their best regular season record in the 2006–07 season, going 39–6–0–3 for 81 points, and a winning percentage of 0.840, second best in the province. In the 2007 playoffs the Cougars won their second VIJHL playoff championship in three years. They then hosted the Cyclone Taylor Cup provincial Junior "B" championships at Esquimalt's Archie Browning Sports Centre, and won the tournament, defeating the Abbotsford Pilots 4–1 to earn the title of the best Junior "B" team in the province in their ninth year of operation.

The Cougars have captured the regular season championship in the 2007–08, 2010–11, 2011–12, 2012–13, 2013–14, 2014–15, 2015–16, 2016–17, and 2019–2020 seasons; they have been in the VIJHL Finals 13 times, capturing eight Brent Patterson Memorial Trophy's. In 2012–13 they set a new league record, winning 45 of 48 games, losing once in regulation and twice in overtime. In the same season former player and current Head Coach, Brody Coulter, set the VIJHL record for points in a season. In 48 games Coulter scored 118 points (39G 79A 2.5 PPG).

In 2025, the franchise was sold to Chris Lynn and Philip Pang. It had previously been owned by the Esquimalt Hockey Society, a non-profit organization. Mike Vandekamp was appointed as general manager and head coach.

== Season-by-season record ==
| Division champions | Regular Season Champions | League champions | Provincial Champions |

| Season | Division | Regular season | | | | | | | | | Playoffs | | | | | |
| Season | Division | GP | W | L | T | OTL | Pts | GF | GA | Result | GP | W | L | GF | GA | Result |
|---|---|---|---|---|---|---|---|---|---|---|---|---|---|---|---|---|
| 1998–99 | South | 40 | 1 | 38 | 1 | — | 3 | 120 | 407 | 4th | | | | | | Lost Division Semifinals |
| 1999–00 | South | 40 | 11 | 22 | 7 | — | 29 | 168 | 219 | 3rd | 4 | 1 | 3 | 14 | 26 | Lost Division Semifinals 1–3 (Panthers) |
| 2000–01 | South | 48 | 23 | 19 | 6 | — | 52 | 233 | 212 | 3rd | 3 | 0 | 3 | 11 | 18 | Lost in Division Semifinals, 0–3 (Islanders) |
| 2001–02 | South | 48 | 23 | 15 | 6 | 4 | 56 | 223 | 209 | 2nd | 4 | 1 | 3 | 13 | 18 | Lost Division Semifinals 1–3 (Islanders) |
| 2002–03 | South | 48 | 27 | 16 | 1 | 4 | 59 | 254 | 191 | 1st | 12 | 7 | 5 | 38 | 41 | Won Division Semifinals 4–0 (Islanders); Won Division Finals 3–2 (Panthers); Lost Finals, 0–3 (Storm) |
| 2003–04 | South | 48 | 28 | 17 | 3 | 0 | 59 | 230 | 186 | 2nd | 11 | 6 | 5 | 40 | 33 | Won in Division Semifinals, 4–1 (Braves); Lost in Division Finals, 2–4 (Panthers) |
| 2004–05 | South | 48 | 29 | 11 | 5 | 3 | 61 | 219 | 145 | 2nd | 13 | 10 | 3 | 66 | 46 | Won in Division Semifinals (Islanders); Won in Division Finals (Panthers); Brent Patterson Memorial Trophy Champions, 2–0 (Storm); Finished 3rd in Cyclone Taylor Cup, 1–2–1 (Final vs Pilots) |
| 2005–06 | South | 42 | 29 | 8 | 2 | 3 | 61 | 231 | 129 | 2nd | 5 | 1 | 4 | 12 | 17 | Lost in Division Semifinals, 1–4 (Braves) |
| 2006–07 | South | 48 | 39 | 6 | 0 | 3 | 81 | 303 | 132 | 2nd | 23 | 16 | 7 | 83 | 36 | Won in Division Semifinals, 4–0 (Stingers); Won in Division Finals, 4–0 (Panthers); Brent Patterson Memorial Trophy Champions, 4–2 (Islanders); Cyclone Taylor Cup Champions, 3–1–0 (Final vs Pilots); Finished 4th in Keystone Cup |
| 2007–08 | South | 48 | 34 | 9 | 2 | 3 | 71 | 226 | 120 | 1st | 19 | 12 | 7 | 82 | 44 | Won in Division Semifinals, 4–0 (Stingers); Won in Division Finals, 4–1 (Panthers); Brent Patterson Memorial Trophy Champions, 4–2 (Islanders); Finished 4th in Cyclone Taylor Cup, 0–4–0 (Final vs Ghostriders) |
| 2008–09 | South | 48 | 34 | 8 | — | 6 | 74 | 236 | 132 | 2nd | 15 | 9 | 6 | 63 | 46 | Won Div. Semifinals 4–1 (Braves); Won in Division Finals, 4–1 (Panthers); Lost in Finals, 1–4 (Generals) |
| 2009–10 | South | 48 | 34 | 7 | — | 7 | 75 | 229 | 141 | 2nd | 14 | 7 | 7 | | | Won in Division Semifinals, 4–3 (Braves); Lost in Division Finals, 3–4 (Panthers) |
| 2010–11 | South | 44 | 33 | 9 | — | 2 | 68 | 202 | 110 | 1st | 10 | 6 | 4 | 26 | 20 | Bye in Quarterfinals; Won Semifinals 3–0 (Generals); Lost in Finals, 3–4 (Panthers) |
| 2011–12 | South | 42 | 36 | 5 | — | 1 | 73 | 200 | 93 | 1st | 13 | 10 | 3 | 60 | 30 | Bye in Quarterfinals; Won Semifinals 4–1 (Islanders); Brent Patterson Memorial Trophy Champions, 4–0 (Panthers); Finished 2nd in Cyclone Taylor Cup, 2–2–0 (Final vs Pilots) |
| 2012–13 | South | 48 | 46 | 1 | — | 2 | 94 | 280 | 98 | 1st | 18 | 14 | 4 | 94 | 42 | Won Division Semifinals 4–1 (Panthers); Won in Division Finals, 4–1 (Braves); Brent Patterson Memorial Trophy Champions, 4–0 (Glacier Kings); Finished 2nd in Cyclone Taylor Cup, 2–2–0 (Final vs Sockeyes) |
| 2013–14 | South | 48 | 35 | 10 | 1 | 2 | 73 | 225 | 92 | 1st | 19 | 14 | 5 | 78 | 36 | Won Div Semifinals 4–0 (Islanders); Won in Division Finals, 4–1 (Storm); Brent Patterson Memorial Trophy Champions, 4–2 (Panthers); Finished 3rd in Cyclone Taylor Cup, 2–2–0 (Final vs Leafs) |
| 2014–15 | South | 48 | 42 | 5 | 1 | | 85 | 256 | 99 | 1st | 12 | 8 | 4 | 66 | 21 | Won Quarterfinals 4–0 (Islanders); Won Semifinals, 4–0 (Wolves); Lost League Finals, 0–4 (Storm) |
| 2015–16 | South | 48 | 41 | 5 | 1 | 1 | 84 | 265 | 88 | 1st | 16 | 12 | 3 | 85 | 42 | Won Quarterfinal 4–0 (Islanders); Won Semifinals, 4–0 (Panthers); Brent Patterson Memorial Trophy Champions, 4–2 (Storm); Cyclone Cup (see below) |
| 2016–17 | South | 48 | 35 | 8 | 0 | 5 | 75 | 208 | 124 | 1st | 18 | 11 | 7 | 60 | 49 | Won Quarterfinals, 4–2 (Wolves); Won Div. Finals, 4–1 (Islanders); Lost League Finals, 3–4 (Storm) |
| 2017–18 | South | 48 | 24 | 21 | 2 | 1 | 51 | 145 | 145 | 3rd | – | – | – | – | – | Lost Quarterfinals, 3–4 (Wolves) |
| 2018–19 | South | 48 | 28 | 12 | 7 | 1 | 99 | 186 | 120 | 1st | 16 | 11 | 4 | 59 | 31 | Won Quarterfinals, 4–1 (Generals); Won Div. Finals, 4–2 (Buchaneers); Won League Finals, 4–1 (Storm); Brent Patterson Memorial Trophy Champions; Cyclone Taylor Cup (see below) |
| 2019–20 | South | 48 | 41 | 6 | 0 | 1 | 83 | 226 | 117 | 1st | 6 | 6 | 0 | 24 | 13 | Playoffs cancelled due to COVID-19 pandemic |
| 2020–21 | South | 13 | 11 | 1 | 0 | 1 | 23 | 61 | 32 | 1st | 0 | 0 | 0 | 0 | 0 | Regular season cancelled due to COVID-19 pandemic. Playoffs were not played. |
| 2021–22 | South | 49 | 35 | 11 | 0 | 3 | 73 | 231 | 131 | 1st | – | – | – | – | – | Lost Quarterfinals, 0–4 (Islanders) |
| 2022–23 | South | 48 | 36 | 11 | 1 | 0 | 73 | 232 | 122 | 2 | – | – | – | – | – | Won Quarterfinals, 4–1 (Islanders); Lost Semifinals, 2–4 (Predators) |
| 2023–24 | South | 48 | 34 | 11 | 2 | 1 | 71 | 232 | 120 | 1st | – | – | – | – | – | Won Div Semifinals, 4–0 (Panthers); Lost Div. Finals, 3-4 (Predators) |
| 2024–25 | South | 48 | 25 | 17 | 2 | 0 | 52 | 174 | 152 | 4/5 Div; 6/11 OA | 6 | 2 | 4 | 23 | 34 | Lost Div Semifinals, 2-4 (Islanders) |
| 2025–26 | South | 48 | 37 | 8 | 3 | 0 | 77 | 237 | 126 | 2/5 Div; 2/11 OA | 17 | 12 | 5 | 52 | 33 | Won Div Semifinals, 4-1 (Wolves); Won Div Finals 4-3 (Panthers); Won League Finals 4-1 (Buccaneers) |

== Provincial Champions ==
| Season | Round Robin | Record | Bronze Medal Game | Gold Medal Game |
| 2005 | N/A | N/A | W, Abbotsford Pilots 4–2 Bronze Medalists | n/a |
| 2007 | N/A | N/A | n/a | W, Abbotsford Pilots 4–1 Gold Medalists |
| 2008 | N/A | N/A | L, Fernie Ghostriders 5–3 4th Place | n/a |
| 2012 | W, Abbotsford Pilots 3–2 W, Beaver Valley Nitehawks 3–0 L, Delta Ice Hawks 7–2 | 2–1 | n/a | L, Abbostford Pilots 3–2 (OT) Silver Medalists |
| 2013 | L, Richmond Sockeyes 5–2 W, Castlegar Rebels 1–0 W, Comox Valley Glacier Kings 6–1 | 2–1 | n/a | L, Richmond Sockeyes 4–1 Silver Medalists |
| 2014 | W, Nelson Leafs 6–1 L, Aldergrove Kodiaks 4–1 L, Beaver Valley Nitehawks 3–0 | 1–2 | W, Nelson Leafs 3–0 Bronze Medalists | n/a |
| 2016* | W, 100 Mile House 4–2; W, Campbell River 5–3; W, Mission City 7–5 | 3–0–0 | n/a | L, 100 Mile House 5–4; Silver Medalists |
| 2019 | W, Revelstoke Grizzlies 4–1 L (OT), Campbell River Storm 3–2 W, N Vancouver Wolf Pack 3–0 | 2–0–0–1 | n/a | L, Revelstoke Grizzlies 5–1 Silver Medalists |

- Victoria Hosted in 2007 and 2016
- Round Robin records only stored online dating back to 2011

== Awards and trophies ==
Cyclone Taylor Cup

- 2006–07

Brent Patterson Memorial Trophy
VIJHL Championship

- 2004–05, 2006–07, 2007–08, 2011–12, 2012–13, 2013–14, 2015–16, 2018–19

Andy Hebenton Trophy
Regular Season Champion

- 2007–08, 2010–11, 2011–12, 2012–13, 2013–14, 2014–15, 2015–16, 2016–17

Grant Peart Memorial Trophy
Least Penalized Team

- 1997–98, 2004–05, 2005–06, 2007–08, 2011–12, 2013–14, 2016–17

Doug Morton Trophy
Leading Scorer

- Daryl Boyer: 1999–00
- Daryl Boyer: 2000–01
- Mark Van Helvoirt: 2001–02
- Karl Carveth: 2004–05
- Michael Hammond: 2005–06
- Steve Axford: 2011–12 (tied with Ty Jones (Braves))
- Brody Coulter: 2012–13
- Sam Mcmullen: 2014–15
- Nathan Looysen: 2015–16

Top Forward
(New award for 2011–12 season)

- Brody Coulter: 2011–12
- Sam Mcmullen: 2014–15
- Nathan Looysen: 2015–16

Jack Kingston Memorial Trophy
Top Defenceman

- Cam Smith: 2005–06
- Jacob Koistinen: 2007–08
- Adam Steenbergen: 2008–09
- Kevan McBean: 2018–19

Jamie Benn Trophy
Most Valuable Player

- Adam Steenbergen: 2009–10
- Brody Coulter: 2012–13
- Sam Mcmullen: 2014–15
- Nathan Looysen: 2015–16

Jamie Robertson Trophy
Most Sportsmanlike Player

- Michael Hammond: 2005–06

Larry Lamoureaux Trophy
Rookie of the Year

- Ryan Fuzi: 2000–01
- Brandon Wong: 2001–02
- Matt Thomson: 2003–04
- Michael Hammond: 2005–06
- Steven Axford: 2007–08
- Samuel Rice: 2008–09

Ray's Sports Centre Trophy
Top Goaltender

- Matt Thomson: 2003–04
- Matt Thomson: 2005–06
- Corey Koop: 2009–10
- Evan Roch 2011–12
- Anthony Ciurro 2015–16

Walt McWilliams Memorial Trophy
Unsung Hero

- Tim Simpson: 2002–03
- Mark Walton: 2012–13
- Mark Walton: 2013–14

Coach of the Year
(New award for 2011–12 season)

- Mark Van Helvoirt 2011–12
