= Oceanside Generals =

- City: Parksville, British Columbia, Canada
- League: Vancouver Island Junior Hockey League
- Division: North
- Founded: 1990
- Home arena: Oceanside Place (Howie Meeker Arena)
- Colours: Blue, Red, white
- Owner: Community Owned
- General manager: (Canada) Rick Hannibal
- Head coach: (Canada) Garrett Dunlop
- Captain: (Canada)
- Website: oceansidegenerals.com

Franchise history
- 1990–2004: Parksville Generals
- 2004–present: Oceanside Generals

Championships
- Playoff championships: 4 1992, 1997, 2009, 2023

The Oceanside Generals are a junior ice hockey team based in Parksville, British Columbia, Canada. They are members of the North Division of the Vancouver Island Junior Hockey League (VIJHL). The team operates as a not for profit society, run by a hockey passionate board of directors. The Generals play their home games at Oceanside Place. Garrett Dunlop is the team's Head Coach.

== History ==
The Generals joined the league in 1990 as an expansion team. In its VIJHL history, the team has won the Brent Patterson Memorial Trophy three times, in 1992, 1997 and 2009. The Generals have won the Andy Hebenton Trophy twice, as the team with the league's best regular season record in 1991 and 1992.

== Season-by-season record ==
Note: GP = Games played, W = Wins, L = Losses, T = Ties, OTL = Overtime Losses, Pts = Points, GF = Goals for, GA = Goals against

Season	GP	W	L	T	OTL	Pts	GF	GA	Finish	Playoff
1999–2000	40	8	29	3	–	19	163	270	4th, North	
2000–01	48	31	13	4	–	66	297	203	2nd, North	Lost in Division Finals, 1–4 (Storm)
2001–02	48	21	23	4	–	46	217	227	2nd, North	Lost in Division Finals, 1–4 (Storm)
2002–03	42	19	19	4	–	42	159	162	3rd, North	Lost in Division Round Robin, 1–4–1 (Storm) and (Glacier Kings)
2003–04					–				3rd, North	Lost in Division Round Robin (Storm) and (Glacier Kings)
2004–05	48	11	30		2	24	145	237	3rd, North	
2005–06	42	11	28		2	24	129	184	3rd, North	Lost in Division Finals, 1–4 (Storm)
2006–07	48	27	17		2	56	208	175	2nd, North	
2007–08	48	31	14		0	62	199	136	1st, North	
2008–09	48	30	15		3	63	189	132	1st, North	Brent Patterson Memorial; Trophy Champions (Cougars)
2009–10	48	24	22		2	50	148	138	2nd, North	
2010–11	44	19	21		4	42	148	165	3rd, North	Won QuarterFinals, 3–2 (Islanders); Lost in Semifinals, 0–3 (Cougars)
2011–12	42	20	20		2	42	144	173	2nd, North	Lost QuarterFinals, 3–4 (Islanders)
2012–13	48	20	25		2	42	157	179	3rd, North	Lost QuarterFinals, 0–4 (Glacier Kings)
2013–14	48	8	37	1	2	19	102	218	4th, North	did not qualify
2014–15	48	7	38	2	1	17	143	283	4th, North	Won Wildcard, 5–2 – (Panthers); Lost QuarterFinals, 0–4 (Storm)
2015–16	48	13	31	1	3	30	147	244	4th, North	Lost Wildcard, 3–2 – (Braves)
2016–17	48	12	33	1	2	27	140	218	4th of 4, North; 8th of 9 VIJHL	Lost Wildcard, 1–3 – (Panthers)
2017–18	48	18	23	1	6	43	143	175	4th of 4, North; 7th of 9 VIJHL	Lost Quarterfinals, 0–4 (Buccaneers)
2018–19	48	18	25	3	2	62	116	143	3rd of 4, North; 7th of 9 VIJHL	Lost Quarterfinals, 1–4 (Cougars)
2019–20	48	31	14	0	3	170	125	65	1st of 4 North; 3rd of 9 VIJHL	Won Quarterfinals, 4–0 (Islanders) incomplete semifinals 0–0 (Storm); Playoffs cancelled due to COVID-19
2020–21	12	7	4	0	1	49	28	15		Remaining season and playoffs lost due to COVID-19
2021–22	49	33	14	0	2	224	145	68	2 of 6nd North; 3rd of 11 VIJHL	Won Quarterfinals, 4–3 (Glacier Kings); Won semifinals 4–0 (Storm); Lost Finals, 2–4 (Panthers)
2022–23	48	41	2	2	2	256	104	86	1 of 6nd North; 1st of 11 VIJHL	Won Quarterfinals, 4–0 (Bombers); Won semifinals 4–1 (Storm); Won Finals, 4–2 (Predators); VIJHL CJHAMPIONS
2023–24	48	27	15	5	1	179	149	59	3 of 6nd North; 6th of 11 VIJHL	Lost Div Semifinals, 2–4 (Glacier Kings)
2024–25	48	12	31	5	0	29	96	200	6th of 6, North; 10th of 11 VIJHL	did not qualify
2025–26	48	28	19	1	0	159	153	57	3 of 6nd North; 5th of 11 VIJHL	Lost Div Semifinals, 0–4 (Glacier Kings)

== Cyclone Taylor Cup ==
British Columbia Jr B Provincial Championships

Season	Round Robin	Record	Standing	Bronze Medal Game	Gold Medal Game
1992	Trail Smoke Eaters; Richmond Sockeyes	?–?–?	3 of 3	n/a	n/a
1997	Beaver Valley Nitehawks; Port Coquitlam Buckeroos	0–2–0	3 of 3	n/a	n/a
2009	?, Richmond Sockeyes ?–? ?, Nelson Leafs ?–? ?, Abbotsford Pilots ?–?	?–?–?	? of 4	W, Abbotsford Pilots 5–3; Bronze Medal	n/a
2010; HOST	?, Revelstoke Grizzlies ?–? ?, Peninsula Panthers ?–? ?, Aldergrove Kodiaks ?–?	?–?–?	? of 4	L, Aldergrove Kodiaks 4–5	n/a
2023	W, Revelstoke Grizzlies 5–1; L, Delta Ice Hawks 4–7; L, Kimberley Dynamiters 3–5	1–2–0	4 of 4	W, Delta Ice Hawks 4–2; Bronze Medal	n/a

== NHL alumni ==
- Kris Mallette

== Awards and trophies ==
Brent Patterson Memorial Trophy
VIJHL Championship

- 1991–92, 1996–97, 2008–09

Andy Hebenton Trophy
Regular Season Champion

- 1990–91, 1991–92

Grant Peart Memorial Trophy
Least Penalized Team

- 2003–04

Doug Morton Trophy
Leading Scorer

- James Startup: 1989–90
- Paul Scorer: 1990–91
- Paul Scorer: 1991–92

Jamie Robertson Trophy
Most Sportsmanlike Player

- Steve Moore: 1993–94
- Joel Corlazzoli: 1999–2000
- Ian Hall: 2006–07
- Taylor Morgan: 2007–08
- Brent Baltus: 2009–10
- Michael Fretz: 2012–13

Ray's Sports Centre Trophy
Top Goaltender

- Cesare Marcellus: 1989–90
- Cesare Marcellus: 1990–91
- Cesare Marcellus: 1991–92
- Brodie Opheim: 1994–95

Walt McWilliams Memorial Trophy
Unsung Hero

- Ian McCann: 1991–92
- Kevin Barabash: 1997–98
- Derek Brown: 2003–04
- Kyle Yamasaki: 2011–12
