= Campbell River Storm =

Canadian junior ice hockey team

- City: Campbell River, British Columbia
- League: Vancouver Island Junior Hockey League
- Division: North
- Founded: 1997
- Home arena: Rod Brind'Amour Arena
- Colours: Black Silver
- Owners: Linda Lahtinen; Brad Smith
- General manager: Lee Stone
- Head coach: Lee Stone

The Campbell River Storm are a junior ice hockey team based in Campbell River, British Columbia, Canada. They are members of the North Division of the Vancouver Island Junior Hockey League (VIJHL). The Storm play their home games at Rod Brind'Amour Arena.

The Storm joined the league in 1997 as an expansion team. In its VIJHL history, the team has won the Cyclone Taylor Cup twice, in 1999 and 2015. The Storm have won the Brent Patterson Memorial Trophy ten times in 1998, 1999, 2000, 2001, 2002, 2003, 2004, 2015, 2017 and 2018. They won the Andy Hebenton Trophy seven times, as the team with the league's best regular season record in 1997, 1998, 2000, 2001, 2002, 2003 and 2018.

In 2015, the Storm became the only team in VIJHL history, to win the VIJHL Championship, The BC Provincial Championship and the Keystone Cup as Western Canada's Junior B champions, all in the same season.

== History ==
The team began play in the 1997–98 season and went on to capture the Patterson Memorial Trophy as playoff champions in its first season. They would win the trophy 6 more times in a row, then reach the finals the following 2 seasons, losing in six games to the Victoria Cougars in 2005, then again in 6 games to the Kerry Park Islanders in 2006.

They have played in 9 Cyclone Taylor Cup tournaments, winning it twice in 1999 and 2015 and silver in 2017. In 2004 they hosted it, losing to the Richmond Sockeyes of the Pacific International Junior Hockey League in the finals. In 2019, they will once again be the hosts of the Cyclone Taylor Cup.

Three times they have played in the Keystone Cup, capturing bronze in 1999 in Thunder Bay, Ontario, taking silver as hosts in 2006, and winning gold in 2015 in Cold Lake, Alberta. They play out of the Strathcona Gardens Complex in Campbell River, in Rod Brind'Amour Arena. They were previously owned and coached by Jim Revenberg, who was selected in the 7th round of the 1989 NHL entry draft by the Vancouver Canucks. Current owners are Linda Lahtinen (2011–Present) and Brad Smith (2025–Present).

== Season-by-season record ==
Note: GP = Games played, W = Wins, L = Losses, T = Ties, OTL = Overtime Losses, Pts = Points, GF = Goals for, GA = Goals against

Season	GP	W	L	T	OTL	Pts	GF	GA	Finish	Playoffs
1999–00	40	24	10	6	-	54	187	144	1st, North	Brent Patterson Memorial; Trophy Champions
2000–01	48	33	10	5	-	71	269	145	1st, North	Brent Patterson Memorial; Trophy Champions, 4-3 (Islanders); Cyclone Taylor Cup Runners-Up (Nitehawks)
2001–02	48	40	4	4	-	84	279	131	1st, North	Brent Patterson Memorial; Trophy Champions, 4-1 (Panthers)
2002–03	43	36	7	0	-	72	267	128	1st, North	Brent Patterson Memorial; Trophy Champions, 3-0 (Cougars); Cyclone Taylor Cup Runners-Up, 1-2 (Sockeyes)
2003–04	48	43	2	1	2	89	368	120	1st, North	Brent Patterson Memorial; Trophy Champions, 3-0 (Panthers)
2004–05	48	33	11		2	68	232	186	1st, North	
2005–06	42	23	16		1	47	168	144	1st, North	Lost in Finals, 2-4 (Islanders)
2006–07	48	26	20		1	53	193	161	3rd, North	
2007–08	48	29	15		3	61	174	123	3rd, North	
2008–09	48	21	24		3	45	161	175	4th, North	
2009–10	48	15	30		3	33	150	212	4th, North	
2010–11	44	9	34		1	19	111	242	4th, North	Lost Quarterfinals, 0-3 (Panthers)
2011–12	42	16	25		1	33	137	187	3rd, North	Lost Quarterfinals, 2-4 (Braves)
2012–13	48	12	33		3	27	150	219	4th, North	Lost Play in Round, 0-1 (Islanders)
2013-14	48	30	14	2	2	64	218	141	2nd, North	Won Quarterfinals, 4-2 (Buccaneers); Lost Div finals, 3-4 (Panthers)
2014-15	48	39	4	1	4	83	280	117	1st North; 2nd VIJHL	Won Div semifinals, 4-0 - (Generals); Won Div finals, 4-1 (Glacier Kings); Won VIJHL Finals, 4-0 (Victoria Cougars) to Cyclone Taylor Cup
2015-16	48	38	6	2	2	80	250	129	1st North; 2nd VIJHL	Won Div semifinals, 4-2 - (Braves); Won Div finals, 4-0 (Buccaneers); Lost League Finals, 2-4 (Cougars)
2016-17	48	34	12	0	2	70	217	126	1st of 4 North; 2nd of 9 VIJHL	Won Div semifinals, 4-0 (Panthers); Won Division Finals, 4-1 (Buccaneers); Won VIJHL Finals, 4-3 (Cougars) to Cyclone Taylor Cup
2017-18	48	36	6	4	2	78	237	95	1st of 4 North; 1st of 9 VIJHL	Won Quarterfinals, 4-1 (Panthers); Won Div semifinals 4-0 (Wolves); Won VIJHL Finals 4-3 (Braves) to Cyclone Taylor Cup
2018-19	48	34	10	3	1	109	207	92	1st of 4 North; 1st of 9 VIJHL	Won Quarterfinals, 4-3 (Panthers); Won Div semifinals 4-0 (Braves) lost VIJHL Finals 1-4 (Cougars)
2019-20	48	29	16	0	3	161	127	61	4th of 4 North; 4th of 9 VIJHL	Won Quarterfinals, 4-2 (Buccaneers) incomplete semifinals 0-0 (Generals); Playoffs cancelled due to covid-19
2020-21	13	11	2	0	0	70	24	22		Remaining season and playoffs lost due to COVID-19
2021-22	46	40	4	0	2	222	98	82	1st of 6 North; 4th of 9 VIJHL	Won Quarterfinals, 4-3 (Bombers); Lost semifinals 0-4 (Generals)
2022-23	48	34	12	1	1	206	137	70	2nd of 6 North; 3rd of 11 VIJHL	Won Quarterfinals, 4-3 (Glacier Kings); Lost semifinals 1-4 (Generals)
2023-24	48	36	10	1	1	248	155	74	1st of 6 North; 1st of 11 VIJHL	Lost Div semifinals, 2-4 (Islanders)
2024-25	48	31	12	5	0	248	188	67	1st of 6 North; 3rd of 11 VIJHL	Won Div semifinals, 4-0 (Kraken); Won Div Finals, 4-2 (Bombers); Lost League Finals 3-4 (Panthers)
2025-26	48	25	21	2	0	171	168	52	4th of 6 North; 7th of 11 VIJHL	Lost Div semifinals, 0-4 (Buccaneers)

== Cyclone Taylor Cup ==
British Columbia Jr B Provincial Championships

Season	Round Robin	Record	Standing	Bronze Medal Game	Gold Medal Game
2015	W, North Vancouver 6-3; OTW, Kimberley 4-3; W, Mission City 3-0	3-0-0	1st of 4	n/a	W, Kimberley 6-5; Cyclone Taylor Cup Champs
2016*	L, Mission City 2-7; L, Victoria 3-5; L, 100 Mile House 3-4	0-3-0	4th of 4	W, Mission City 8-4; Bronze Medalists	did not qualify
2017	L, Beaver Valley 0-6; W, Creston Valley 6-2; OTW, Aldergrove 2-1	1-1-1	2nd of 4	n/a	L, Beaver Valley 6-2 Storm Win Silver Medal
2018	L, Richmond Sockeyes 1-4; OTL, Delta Ice Hawks 2-3; W, Kimberley Dynamiters 9-0	1-1-1	3rd of 4	L, Kimberley Dynamiters 1-7	did not qualify

- - VIJHL Champs Victoria Cougars were Cyclone Cup hosts - Storm advanced as VIJHL representative

== Keystone Cup ==
Western Canadian Jr. B Championships (Northern Ontario to British Columbia)
Six teams in round robin play. 1st vs 2nd for gold/silver & 3rd vs. 4th for bronze.

Year	Round Robin	Record	Standing	SemiFinal	Bronze Medal; Game	Gold Medal; Game
2015	W, Saskatoon - Sask 4-2; W, Cold Lake - Alta 4-2; L, N Edmonton - Alta 4-5; W, Thunder Bay - Ont 5-2; W, Selkirk - Man 6-1	4-1-0	1st of 6	n/a	n/a	W, N Edmonton - Alta 6-3; Keystone Cup Champions

== NHL Alumni ==
- Dylan Garand
- Beck Malenstyn
- Clayton Stoner

== Notable alumni ==
- Colin Blake (All Time Leading Scorer 327 points 2012 - 2017)

== Awards and trophies ==
Cyclone Taylor Cup

- 1998-99, 2014–15

Brent Patterson Memorial Trophy
VIJHL Championship

- 1997-98, 1998–99, 1999–00, 2000–01, 2001–02, 2002–03, 2003–04, 2014–15, 2016–17

Andy Hebenton Trophy
Regular Season Champion

- 1996-97, 1997–98, 1999–00, 2000–01, 2001–02, 2002–03, 2017–18, 2023-24

Grant Peart Memorial Trophy
Least Penalized Team

- 2006-07

Doug Morton Trophy
Leading Scorer

- Jason Jaques: 2002-03
- David Arduin: 2003-04
- Karl Hagg: 2008-09

Jamie Robertson Trophy
Most Sportsmanlike Player

- David Arduin: 2003-04

Larry Lamoureaux Trophy
Rookie of the Year

- Justin Birks: 1999-00

Ray's Sports Centre Trophy
Top Goaltender

- David Klatt: 1996-97
- Davis Parley: 1997-98
- Erick Robertson: 1999-00
- Ryan Riddle: 2000-01
- Justin Foote: 2001-02
- Kyle Blanleil: 2002-03
- Chris Smith: 2016-17

Walt McWilliams Memorial Trophy
Unsung Hero

- Brandon Gee: 1998-99
- Jesse Bachmeier: 2008-09
- Kobe Oishi: 2016-17

Preceded by Beaver Valley Nitehawks	Keystone Cup Champions; 2015	Succeeded by 100 Mile House Wranglers
