= Vancouver Island Junior Hockey League =

Junior ice hockey league

- Sport: Ice hockey
- Founded: 1965
- First season: 1965–66
- No. of teams: 11
- Most recent champion: Victoria Cougars
- Most titles: Campbell River Storm
- Feeder to: BCHL
- Website: www.vijhl.com

The Vancouver Island Junior Hockey League (VIJHL) is a junior ice hockey league of 11 clubs on Vancouver Island. The Brent Patterson Memorial Trophy is awarded annually to the league playoff champion at the end of each season. In 2024, the league decided to withdraw from the Hockey Canada framework and operate as an independent farm league for the BCHL.

== History ==
The most recent provincial Jr. B champions to come from the Vancouver Island Junior Hockey League are the Campbell River Storm in 2015, the Peninsula Panthers in 2011, the Victoria Cougars in 2007, and the Campbell River Storm again in 1999 during their dynasty of the league. The only team in VIJHL history to ever win the Keystone Cup as Western Canadian champions are the 2015 Campbell River Storm. This has been accomplished multiple times by teams in the rival Pacific Junior Hockey League and Kootenay International Junior Hockey League.

In 2012, the VIJHL announced the addition of two new franchises, the Nanaimo Buccaneers and the Westshore Wolves. The Buccaneers are the namesake of a team that played in the VIJHL in the 1970s. The Wolves are not new to the area either, but are replacing an unsuccessful team, the Westshore Stingers, that folded on December 4, 2010. The Lake Cowichan Kraken and Port Alberni Bombers joined the league as expansion franchises in the 2021–22 VIJHL season.

In 2023, governing body BC Hockey announced plans to restructure its junior hockey framework following the departure of its only Junior A league. The three Junior B leagues (PJHL, KIJHL and VIJHL) were summarily designated as "Junior A Tier 2", with plans to conduct an independent evaluation of those teams seeking to be promoted to "Junior A Tier 1". It was expected that those teams promoted to Tier 1 would eventually apply for membership in the CJHL. The league expected the evaluations to be completed during the 2024–25 season.

In April 2024, the league announced that it would withdraw from the Hockey Canada framework and become an independent farm league for the BCHL in the 2024–25 season. Some BCHL clubs acquired an ownership stake in VIJHL clubs after the announcement. However, sources reported that there will be no club-specific affiliations, and that BCHL teams will be allowed to call players up from, or send players down to, any VIJHL team.

== Franchises ==
Map of VIJHL teams
North division
South division

| Division | Team | Home | Arena |
|---|---|---|---|
| North | Campbell River Storm | Campbell River | Rod Brind'Amour Arena |
| North | Comox Valley Glacier Kings | Courtenay | Comox Valley Sports Centre |
| North | Lake Cowichan Kraken | Lake Cowichan | Cowichan Lake Sport Arena |
| North | Nanaimo Buccaneers | Nanaimo | Nanaimo Ice Centre |
| North | Oceanside Generals | Parksville | Oceanside Place |
| North | Port Alberni Bombers | Port Alberni | Alberni Valley Multiplex |
| South | Kerry Park Islanders | Mill Bay | Kerry Park Arena |
| South | Peninsula Panthers | North Saanich | Panorama Recreation Centre |
| South | Saanich Predators | Saanich | George Pearkes Arena |
| South | Victoria Cougars | Esquimalt | Archie Browning Sports Centre |
| South | Westshore Wolves | Colwood | The Q Centre |

== Brent Patterson Memorial Trophy champions ==
| Year | Winning team | Runner up |
|---|---|---|
| 2026 | Victoria Cougars | Nanaimo Buccaneers |
| 2025 | Peninsula Panthers | Campbell River Storm |
| 2024 | Saanich Predators | Kerry Park Islanders |
| 2023 | Oceanside Generals | Saanich Predators |
| 2022 | Peninsula Panthers | Oceanside Generals |
| 2021 | Cancelled due to public health restrictions | |
| 2020 | Cancelled due to public health restrictions | |
| 2019 | Victoria Cougars | Campbell River Storm |
| 2018 | Campbell River Storm | Saanich Braves |
| 2017 | Campbell River Storm | Victoria Cougars |
| 2016 | Victoria Cougars | Campbell River Storm |
| 2015 | Campbell River Storm | Victoria Cougars |
| 2014 | Victoria Cougars | Peninsula Panthers |
| 2013 | Victoria Cougars | Comox Valley Glacier Kings |
| 2012 | Victoria Cougars | Peninsula Panthers |
| 2011 | Peninsula Panthers | Victoria Cougars |
| 2010 | Peninsula Panthers | Comox Valley Glacier Kings |
| 2009 | Oceanside Generals | Victoria Cougars |
| 2008 | Victoria Cougars | Kerry Park Islanders |
| 2007 | Victoria Cougars | Kerry Park Islanders |
| 2006 | Kerry Park Islanders | Campbell River Storm |
| 2005 | Victoria Cougars | Campbell River Storm |
| 2004 | Campbell River Storm | Peninsula Panthers |
| 2003 | Campbell River Storm | Victoria Cougars |
| 2002 | Campbell River Storm | Peninsula Panthers |
| 2001 | Campbell River Storm | Kerry Park Islanders |

| Year | Winning team |
|---|---|
| 2000 | Campbell River Storm |
| 1999 | Campbell River Storm |
| 1998 | Campbell River Storm |
| 1997 | Parksville Generals |
| 1996 | Saanich Braves |
| 1995 | Comox Valley Glacier Kings |
| 1994 | Kerry Park Islanders |
| 1993 | Kerry Park Islanders |
| 1992 | Parksville Generals |
| 1991 | Kerry Park Islanders |
| 1990 | Kerry Park Islanders |
| 1989 | Peninsula Eagles |
| 1988 | Saanich Braves |
| 1987 | Juan de Fuca Gulls |
| 1986 | Kerry Park Islanders |
| 1985 | Oak Bay Flyers |
| 1984 | Saanich Braves |
| 1983 | Oak Bay Flyers |
| 1982 | Kerry Park Islanders |
| 1981 | Oak Bay Flyers |
| 1980 | Saanich Braves |
| 1979 | Saanich Braves |
| 1978 | Saanich Braves |

== 2025 playoffs ==
Quarter Finals
1 | Kerry Park | 4
4 | Victoria | 2
2 | Peninsula | 4
3 | Westshore | 1
1 | Campbell River | 4
4 | Lake Cowichan | 0
2 | Port Alberni | 4
3 | Comox Valley | 0

Semi Finals
1 | Kerry Park | 0
2 | Peninsula | 4
1 | Campbell River | 4
2 | Port Alberni | 2

Finals
2 | Peninsula | 4
1 | Campbell River | 3

== Division Semifinals ==
=== South Division ===
==== (1) Kerry Park Islanders vs. (4) Victoria Cougars ====
| February 25 | Victoria Cougars | 4-8 | Kerry Park Islanders | Kerry Park Arena | Recap |

| February 27 | Kerry Park Islanders | 2-4 | Victoria Cougars | Archie Browning Arena | Recap |

| March 1 | Victoria Cougars | 4-10 | Kerry Park Islanders | Kerry Park Arena | Recap |

| March 2 | Kerry Park Islanders | 7-2 | Victoria Cougars | Archie Browning Arena | Recap |

| March 4 | Victoria Cougars | 3-7 | Kerry Park Islanders | Kerry Park Arena | Recap |

| March 6 | Kerry Park Islanders | 4-2 | Victoria Cougars | Archie Browning Arena | Recap |

| Kerry Park wins series 4-2 |

==== (2) Peninsula Panthers vs. (3) Westshore Wolves ====
| February 24 | Westshore Wolves | 1-3 | Peninsula Panthers | Panorama Recreation Centre | Recap |

| February 26 | Peninsula Panthers | 2-3 | Westshore Wolves | The Q Centre | Recap |

| February 28 | Westshore Wolves | 1-2 | OT | Peninsula Panthers | Panorama Recreation Centre | Recap |

| March 1 | Peninsula Panthers | 5-4 | Westshore Wolves | The Q Centre | Recap |

| March 3 | Westshore Wolves | 2-6 | Peninsula Panthers | Panorama Recreation Centre | Recap |

| Peninsula wins 4-1 |

=== North Division ===
==== (1) Campbell River Storm vs. (4) Lake Cowichan Kraken ====
| February 25 | Lake Cowichan Kraken | 2-7 | Campbell River Storm | Rod Brind'Amour Arena | Recap |

| February 27 | Campbell River Storm | 4-3 | OT | Lake Cowichan Kraken | Cowichan Lake Sports Arena | Recap |

| February 28 | Lake Cowichan Kraken | 1-3 | Campbell River Storm | Rod Brind'Amour Arena | Recap |

| March 2 | Campbell River Storm | 2-1 | Lake Cowichan Kraken | Cowichan Lake Sports Arena | Recap |

| Campbell River wins 4 – 0 |

==== (2) Port Alberni Bombers vs. (3) Comox Valley Glacier Kings ====
| February 26 | Comox Valley Glacier Kings | 0-4 | Port Alberni Bombers | Alberni Valley Multiplex | Recap |

| February 28 | Port Alberni Bombers | 4-3 | Comox Valley Glacier Kings | Comox Valley Sports Centre | Recap |

| March 2 | Comox Valley Glacier Kings | 1-4 | Port Alberni Bombers | Alberni Valley Multiplex | Recap |

| March 4 | Port Alberni Bombers | 4-3 | Comox Valley Glacier Kings | Comox Valley Sports Centre | Recap |

| Port Alberni wins 4-0 |

== Division Finals ==
=== South Division ===
==== (1) Kerry Park Islanders vs. (2) Peninsula Panthers ====
| March 11 | Peninsula Panthers | 5-4 | Kerry Park Islanders | Kerry Park Arena | Recap |

| March 14 | Kerry Park Islanders | 1-7 | Peninsula Panthers | Panorama Recreation Centre | Recap |

| March 15 | Peninsula Panthers | 5-1 | Kerry Park Islanders | Kerry Park Arena | Recap |

| March 17 | Kerry Park Islanders | 3-5 | Peninsula Panthers | Panorama Recreation Centre | Recap |

| Peninsula wins 4-0 |

=== Division/Conference ===
==== (1) Campbell River Storm vs. (2) Port Alberni Bombers ====
| March 11 | Port Alberni Bombers | 1-5 | Campbell River Storm | Rod Brind'Amour Arena | Recap |

| March 13 | Campbell River Storm | 3-1 | Port Alberni Bombers | Alberni Valley Multiplex | Recap |

| March 14 | Port Alberni Bombers | 5-2 | Campbell River Storm | Rod Brind'Amour Arena | Recap |

| March 16 | Campbell River Storm | 3-2 | 2OT | Port Alberni Bombers | Alberni Valley Multiplex | Recap |

| March 18 | Port Alberni Bombers | 5-3 | Campbell River Storm | Rod Brind'Amour Arena | Recap |

| March 20 | Campbell River Storm | 5-3 | Port Alberni Bombers | Alberni Valley Multiplex | Recap |

| Campbell River wins 4-2 |

== Brent Patterson Memorial Trophy Finals ==
=== Peninsula Panthers vs. Campbell River Storm ===
| March 24 | Campbell River Storm | 2-4 | Peninsula Panthers | Panorama Recreation Centre | Recap |

| March 26 | Peninsula Panthers | 4-3 | Campbell River Storm | Rod Brind'Amour Arena | Recap |

| March 28 | Campbell River Storm | 2-1 | 2OT | Peninsula Panthers | Panorama Recreation Centre | Recap |

| March 29 | Peninsula Panthers | 2-5 | Campbell River Storm | Rod Brind'Amour Arena | Recap |

| April 1 | Campbell River Storm | 2-0 | Peninsula Panthers | Panorama Recreation Centre | Recap |

| April 2 | Peninsula Panthers | 4-3 | Campbell River Storm | Rod Brind'Amour Arena | Recap |

| April 4 | Campbell River Storm | 2-3 | OT | Peninsula Panthers | Panorama Recreation Centre | Recap |

| Peninsula wins 4-3 |

== League championships by team ==
| Team | Championships |
|---|---|
| Campbell River Storm | 13 |
| Victoria Cougars | 9 |
| Kerry Park Islanders | 7 |
| Saanich Braves | 6 |
| Peninsula Panthers | 4 |
| Oak Bay Flyers | 3 |
| Parksville Generals | 3 |
| Oceanside Generals | 2 |
| Peninsula Eagles | 1 |
| Saanich Predators | 1 |
| Comox Valley Glacier Kings | 1 |
| Juan de Fuca Gulls | 1 |

== NHL alumni ==
- Jamie Benn
- Jordie Benn
- Matt Ellison
- Dylan Garand
- Matt Irwin
- Trent Knorr
- Beck Malenstyn
- Ryan O'Byrne
- Clayton Stoner

== See also ==
- List of ice hockey teams in British Columbia
