= Comox Valley Glacier Kings =

- City: Courtenay, British Columbia
- League: Vancouver Island Junior Hockey League
- Division: North
- Founded: 1992–93
- Home arena: Comox Valley Sports Centre
- Colours: Blue, Red, Silver, White
- Owner: (Canada) David Webb - Marsha Webb - Iris Churchill
- General manager: (Canada) Curtis Toneff
- Head coach: Curtis Toneff (2024-Present)
- Website: www.comoxvalleyglacierkings.ca

Franchise history
- 1992-Present: Comox Valley Glacier Kings

The Comox Valley Glacier Kings (nicknamed the Yetis) are a junior ice hockey team based in Courtenay, British Columbia, Canada. They are members of the North Division of the Vancouver Island Junior Hockey League (VIJHL). The Glacier Kings play their home games at Comox Valley Sports Centre, which has a capacity of 1,400. David Webb is the team's president. Curtis Toneff is the coach and General Manager, and they are captained by forward Logan Furlong 2023-24. The Glacier Kings were the hosts of the 2013 Cyclone Taylor Cup.

== History ==
The Glacier Kings joined the league in 1992 as an expansion team. In its VIJHL history, the team has won the Brent Patterson Memorial Trophy once, in 1995. The Glacier Kings have won the Andy Hebenton Trophy once, as the team with the league's best regular season record in 1993.

== Season-by-season record ==
Note: GP = Games played, W = Wins, L = Losses, T = Ties, OTL = Overtime Losses, Pts = Points, GF = Goals for, GA = Goals against

Season	GP	W	L	T	OTL	Pts	GF	GA	Finish	Playoffs
1999–00	40	22	11	7	—	51	179	130	2nd, North	
2000-01	48	20	22	6	—	46	198	183	3rd, North	Lost in Division Semifinals, 0-3 (Generals)
2001-02	48	14	30	4	—	32	146	223	3rd, North	Lost in Division Semifinals, 0-3 (Generals)
2002-03	44	25	13	6	—	56	185	160	2nd, North	Lost in Division Finals, 0-3 (Storm)
2003-04					—				2nd, North	Lost in Division Finals (Storm)
2004-05	48	12	31		4	28	173	244	2nd, North	Lost in Division Round Robin, 0-3 (Generals) and (Storm)
2005-06	42	13	23		4	30	154	192	2nd, North	Lost in Division Semifinals, 2-4 (Generals)
2006-07	48	13	33		2	28	172	286	4th, North	
2007-08	48	18	26		4	40	167	215	4th, North	
2008-09	48	26	19		3	55	197	150	3rd, North	
2009-10	48	19	26		3	41	167	169	3rd, North	Lost in Finals, 1-3 (Panthers)
2010-11	44	32	11		1	65	222	128	1st, North	Lost in Semifinals, 0-3 (Panthers)
2011-12	42	21	18		3	45	152	145	1st, North	Lost in Quarterfinals, 3-4 (Islanders)
2012-13	48	22	22		3	47	186	180	2nd, North	Won in Quarterfinals, 4-0 (Generals); Won in Semifinals, 4-2 (Buccaneers); Lost in Finals, 0-4 (Cougars)
2013-14	48	31	14	1	2	65	177	150	1st, North	Won in Quarterfinals, 4-0 (Braves); Lost in Semifinals, 3-4 (Panthers)
2014-15	48	23	19	1	5	52	172	191	2nd, North	Won Div Semifinals, 4-1 (Buccaneers); Lost Div Finals, 1-4 (Storm)
2015-16	48	19	25	0	4	42	166	201	3rd, North	Lost Div Semifinals, 0-4 (Buccaneers)
2016-17	48	21	21	1	5	48	178	198	3rd of 4, North; 5th of 9 VIJHL	Lost Div Semifinals, 1-4 (Buccaneers)
2017-18	48	4	43	1	0	9	97	258	4th of 4, North; 9th of 9 VIJHL	Did not qualify
2018-19	48	4	42	1	1	10	91	273	4th of 4, North; 9th of 9 VIJHL	Did not qualify
2019-20	48	9	36	0	3	88	207	21	2nd of 4 North; 9th of 9 VIJHL	Did not qualify
2020-21	13	4	8	0	1	38	56	9		Remaining season and playoffs lost due to COVID-19
2021-22	49	28	20	0	1	217	160	57	3 of 6 North; 6th of 11 VIJHL	Lost Quarterfinals, 3-4 (Generals)
2022-23	48	29	14	1	4	222	159	63	3 of 6 North; 4th of 11 VIJHL	Lost Quarterfinals, 3-4 (Storm)
2023-24	48	31	15	1	1	208	144	64	2 of 6 North; 4th of 11 VIJHL	Won Div Semifinals, 4-2 (Generals); Lost Semifinals 3-4 (Islanders)
2024-25	48	21	24	3	0	124	155	45	3 of 6 North; 7th of 11 VIJHL	Lost Quarterfinals, 0-4 (Storm)
2025-26	48	26	16	5	1	154	145	58	2nd of 6 North; 5th of 11 VIJHL	Won Div.finals, 4-0 (Generals); Lost Div, Finals 2-4 (Buccaneers)

== NHL alumni ==
- Ty Wishart

== Awards and trophies ==
Brent Patterson Memorial Trophy
VIJHL Championship

- 1994-95
- Playoff MVP - Peter Mattson

Andy Hebenton Trophy
Regular Season Champion

- 1992-93

Grant Peart Memorial Trophy
Least Penalized Team

- 1993-94, 1994–95, 2000–01, 2007–08, 2008–09, 2009–10

Doug Morton Trophy
Leading Scorer

- Craig Pearson: 1992-93
- Justin Denroche: 1993-94

Jamie Robertson Trophy
Most Sportsmanlike Player

- Craig Pearson: 1992-93

Larry Lamoureaux Trophy
Rookie of the Year

- Clayton Lainsbury: 1998-99
- Jackson Garrett: 2006-07
- Trent Murdoch: 2007-08
- Mitch Ball: 2009-10

Walt McWilliams Memorial Trophy
Unsung Hero

- Scott Zaichkowsky: 1994-95
- 1995-96
