= Kerry Park Islanders =

- City: Mill Bay, British Columbia
- League: Vancouver Island Junior Hockey League
- Division: South
- Founded: 1976–77
- Home arena: Kerry Park Recreation Center
- Colours: White, Orange, Navy Blue
- Owner: (Canada) Brandon Cox
- Head coach: (Canada) Jake Ebner
- Asst. coach: (Canada) Dryden Demelo, Amelia Demelo,
- Website: www.kpislanders.com

Franchise history
- 1976–present: Kerry Park Islanders

The Kerry Park Islanders are a junior ice hockey team based in Mill Bay, British Columbia, Canada. They are members of the South Division of the Vancouver Island Junior Hockey League (VIJHL). The Islanders play their home games at Kerry Park Recreation Center. They are coached by Jake Ebner

== History ==
The Islanders joined the then called 'South Vancouver Island Junior B League' in 1976. In its VIJHL history, the team has won the Brent Patterson Memorial Trophy seven times, in 1982, 1986, 1990, 1991, 1993, 1994 and 2006. The Islanders have won the Andy Hebenton Trophy eight times, as the team with the league's best regular season record in 1980, 1982, 1985, 1986, 1990, 1999, 2005 and 2006.

== Season-by-season record ==
Note: GP = Games played, W = Wins, L = Losses, T = Ties, OTL = Overtime Losses, Pts = Points, GF = Goals for, GA = Goals against

Season	GP	W	L	T	OTL	Pts	GF	GA	Finish	Playoffs
1999–00	40	25	7	8	-	58	201	135	1st, South	
2000–01	47	25	17	5	-	55	224	192	2nd, South	Lost in Finals, 3-4 (Storm)
2001–02	48	25	20	3	-	53	202	194	3rd, South	Lost in Division Finals, 1-4 (Panthers)
2002–03	43	10	30	3	-	23	126	232	4th, South	Lost in Division Semifinals, 0-4 (Cougars)
2003–04	46	9	34	3	-	21			4th, South	Lost in Division Semifinals, 1-4 (Panthers)
2004–05	48	20	24		2	42	199	215	3rd, South	
2005–06	42	30	6		4	64	240	132	1st, South	Brent Patterson Memorial; Trophy Champions, 4-2 (Storm)
2006–07	48	40	5		2	82	298	144	1st, North	
2007–08	48	30	15		1	61	195	150	2nd, North	
2008–09	48	28	18		2	58	170	142	2nd, North	
2009–10	48	33	13		2	68	224	141	1st, North	
2010–11	44	20	22		2	42	150	156	2nd, North	Lost in Quarterfinals, 2-3 (Generals)
2011–12	42	16	21		5	37	153	177	4th, South	Won QuarterFinals, 4-3 (Glacier Kings); Lost SemiFinals, 1-4 (Cougars)
2012–13	48	8	36		4	50	143	254	5th, South	Won Play In Round, 1-0 (Storm); Lost in Quarterfinals, 0-4 (Buccaneers)
2013–14	48	17	25	1	5	40	149	211	4th, South	Lost QuarterFinals, 0-4 (Cougars)
2014–15	48	16	27	1	4	37	165	218	4th, South	Lost in Quarterfinals, 0-4 (Cougars)
2015-16	48	22	24	2	0	46	143	190	4th, South	Lost in Quarterfinals, 0-4 (Cougars)
2016-17	48	22	24	1	1	46	157	170	3rd of 5 Sou; 6th of 9 VIJHL	Won Div semifinals, 4-2 (Braves); Lost Div Final, 1-4 (Cougars)
2017-18	48	21	21	0	6	48	147	166	4th of 5 Sou; 6th of 9 VIJHL	Lost Quarterfinals, 1-4 (Braves)
2018-19	48	24	15	3	6	84	186	146	2nd of 5 Sou; 4th of 9 VIJHL	Lost Div Quarterfinals, 2-4 (Braves)
2019-20	48	11	34	0	3	111	127	25	5th of 5 South; 8th of 9 VIJHL	Lost Quarterfinals, 0-4 (Generals)
2020-21	11	5	6	0	0	36	37	10		Remaining season and playoffs lost due to COVID-19
2021-22	50	22	26	0	2	174	191	46	4th of 5 South; 8th of 11 VIJHL	Won Quarterfinals, 4-0 (Cougars); Lost semifinals 2-4 (Panthers)
2022-23	48	21	24	2	1	152	194	45	4th of 5 South; 7th of 11 VIJHL	Lost Quarterfinals, 1-4 (Cougars)
2023-24	48	28	20	0	0	199	156	56	4th of 5 South; 7th of 11 VIJHL	Won Div semifinals, 4-2 (Storm); Won Semifinals 4-3 (Glacier Kings); Lost League Finals 1-4 (Predators)
2024-25	48	37	7	3	1	240	150	78	1st of 5 South; 1st of 11 VIJHL	Won Div Semifinals, 4-2 (Cougars) lost Div Finals 0-4 (Panthers)
2025-26	48	2	46	0	0	93	287	56 4	5th of 5 South; 11th of 11 VIJHL	Did Not Qualify

== NHL alumni ==
- Matt Ellison

== Awards and trophies ==
Brent Patterson Memorial Trophy
VIJHL Championship

- 1981-82, 1985–86, 1989–90, 1990–91, 1992–93, 1993–94, 2005–06

Andy Hebenton Trophy
Regular Season Champion

- 1979-80, 1981–82, 1984–85, 1985–86, 1989–90, 1998–99, 2004–05, 2005–06

Grant Peart Memorial Trophy
Least Penalized Team

- 1981-82, 1982–83, 1983–84, 1985–86, 1987–88, 1996–97, 1999-00, 2002–03

Doug Morton Trophy
Leading Scorer

- Mark Johnson 1981-82
- Mark Johnson 1982-83
- Bob Court: 1985-86
- Brent Scyrup: 1995-96

Jack Kingston Memorial Trophy
Top Defenceman

- Trevor Greco: 2006-07

Jamie Robertson Trophy
Most Sportsmanlike Player

- Dave Bodger: 1982-83
- Bob Court: 1984-85
- John Rankin: 1986-87
- Keegan Young: 2004-05

Larry Lamoureaux Trophy
Rookie of the Year

- Matt Ellison: 1997-98

Ray's Sports Centre Trophy
Top Goaltender

- Jim Lekitschnig: 1979-80
- Peter Hall: 1984-85
- Peter Hall: 1985-86
- 1998-99
- Riley Blinco: 2004-05
- Kiefer Smiley-Didier: 2005-06

Walt McWilliams Memorial Trophy
Unsung Hero

- Clint Whittaker: 1989-90
- Joe Life: 1990-91
- Chad Erickson: 1992-93
- Greg Strom: 1993-94
- Dan Whiteford: 1996-97
- Neil Doherty: 2005-06
- Colin Fernandes: 2007-08
