= 2016–17 KIJHL season =

American and Canadian ice hockey season

- League: KIJHL
- Sport: Ice hockey
- Duration: September–February
- Games: 47
- Teams: 20
- League champions: Beaver Valley Nitehawks
- Runners-up: Chase Heat

Seasons
- ← 2015–16 2017–18 →

The 2016–17 KIJHL season was the 50th in league history. The regular season began on September 9, 2016, and continued until February 19, 2017. The playoffs began the following week, and ended when the Beaver Valley Nitehawks won their eighth championship in franchise history by defeating the Chase Heat four games to zero

== Regular season ==
Teams played 47 games throughout the course of the season.

=== Standings ===
The final league standings were as follows.

Eddie Mountain division
Team	W	L	OTL	T	Pts
Creston Valley Thunder Cats	36	9	1	1	74
Kimberley Dynamiters	33	13	1	0	67
Fernie Ghostriders	26	18	2	1	55
Columbia Valley Rockies	14	29	4	0	32
Golden Rockets	5	37	4	1	15

Neil Murdoch division
Team	W	L	OTL	T	Pts
Beaver Valley Nitehawks	38	5	3	1	80
Castlegar Rebels	30	16	1	0	61
Nelson Leafs	21	21	4	1	47
Grand Forks Border Bruins	20	21	3	3	46
Spokane Braves	8	38	1	0	17

Okanagan division
Team	W	L	OTL	T	Pts
Osoyoos Coyotes	37	8	1	1	76
Summerland Steam	34	9	3	1	72
Kelowna Chiefs	20	22	3	2	45
North Okanagan Knights	15	29	1	2	33
Princeton Posse	12	29	5	1	30

Doug Birks division
Team	W	L	OTL	T	Pts
Chase Heat	31	12	2	2	66
100 Mile House Wranglers	27	12	5	3	62
Kamloops Storm	23	17	6	1	53
Revelstoke Grizzlies	19	25	2	1	41
Sicamous Eagles	10	36	1	0	21

== Playoffs ==
Division Semi Finals
Creston Valley	4
Columbia Valley	0
Kimberley	4
Fernie	2
Beaver Valley	4
Grand Forks	0
Castlegar	2
Nelson	4
Osoyoos	4
North Okanagan	0
Summerland	4
Kelowna	3
Chase	4
Revelstoke	1
100 Mile House	2
Kamloops	4

Division Finals
Creston Valley	2
Kimberley	4
Beaver Valley	4
Nelson	0
Osoyoos	4
Summerland	0
Chase	4
Kamloops	1

Conference Finals
Kimberley	2
Beaver Valley	4
Osoyoos	2
Chase	4

2017 KIJHL Championships
Beaver Valley	4
Chase	0

League map
Legend
- Kootenay Conference
- Eddie Mountain Division
- 1 Golden Rockets
- 2 Columbia Valley Rockies
- 3 Fernie Ghostriders
- 4 Kimberley Dynamiters
- 5 Creston Thundercats
- Neil Murdoch Division
- 6 Nelson Leafs
- 7 Castlegar Rebels
- 8 Beaver Valley Nitehawks
- 9 Spokane Braves
- 10 Grand Forks Border Bruins
- Okanagan/Shuswap Conference
- Okanagan Division
- 11 Osoyoos Coyotes
- 12 Princeton Posse
- 13 North Okanagan Knights
- 14 Kelowna Chiefs
- 15 Summerland Steam
- Doug Birks Division
- 16 Revelstoke Grizzlies
- 17 Sicamous Eagles
- 18 Chase Heat
- 19 Kamloops Storm
- 20 100 Mile House Wranglers
