= Scott Jackson =

Scott Jackson may refer to:

- Scott Jackson (American football) (born 1979), American football player
- Scott Jackson (ice hockey) (born 1987), Canadian ice hockey player
- Scott Jackson (baseball), American baseball coach
- Scott Jackson (Lost), a character on the television series Lost
