= Chase Chiefs =

- City: Chase, British Columbia
- League: Kootenay International Junior Hockey League
- Conference: Okanagan/Shuswap
- Division: Okanagan
- Founded: 2007–08
- Home arena: Art Holding Memorial Arena
- Colours: Red, black, white
- General manager: (Canada) Fred Pittendreigh
- Head coach: (Canada) Brad Fox
- Website: chasechiefs.com

Franchise history
- 2007-10: Chase Chiefs
- 2010-present: Kelowna Chiefs

The Chase Chiefs were a junior 'B' ice hockey team from Chase, British Columbia. They played in the Kootenay International Junior Hockey League. They were founded in 2007 as an expansion team. In 2010, the team moved to Kelowna, to become the Kelowna Chiefs. In 2011 the town of Chase received a second expansion franchise in the KIJHL, the Chase Heat, replacing the Chiefs

== Season-by-season record ==
Note: GP = Games played, W = Wins, L = Losses, T = Ties, OTL = Overtime Losses, Pts = Points, GF = Goals for, GA = Goals against

Records as of February 13, 2010.

Season	GP	W	L	T	OTL	Pts	GF	GA	Finish	Playoffs
2007-08	52	26	20	—	5	57	188	176	4th, Eddie Mountain: West	Did not qualify
2008-09	52	25	23	—	4	54	176	180	3rd, Okanagan	Lost in Conference Semifinals, 3-4 (Eagles)
2009-10	50	26	20	0	4	56	194	165	4th, Okanagan	Lost in Conference Semifinals, 2–4 (Grizzlies)

=== Playoffs ===
Records as of March 6, 2010.

Season	1st Round	2nd Round	3rd Round	Finals
2007–08	Did not qualify			
2008–09	W, 4-4, RRT	L, 3-4, SIC	—	—
2009–10	W, 3-1, KAM	L, 2-4, REV	—	—
