= 2010–11 KIJHL season =

American and Canadian ice hockey season

- League: Kootenay International Junior Hockey League
- Sport: Hockey
- Duration: Preseason; 2010-09-01 – 2010-09-08; Regular season 2010-09-10 – 2011-02-12; Playoffs; 2011-02-14 – 2011-03-26
- Teams: 18
- Finals champions: Osoyoos Coyotes

KIJHL seasons
- 2011–12 KIJHL season

The 2010–11 KIJHL season was the 44th season of the Kootenay International Junior Hockey League. Eighteen teams played 52 games each during the regular season schedule, which started on September 10, 2010 and ended on February 12, 2011.

The playoffs began shortly after the regular season ended, and ended at the end April, with the Osoyoos Coyotes awarded the KIJHL Championship, and a berth in the 2011 Cyclone Taylor Cup, hosted by the Fernie Ghostriders in Fernie, British Columbia, at the Fernie Memorial Arena.

== All-Star Game ==
The 2011 KIJHL All-Star Game was played on January 15, 2011 in Fernie, British Columbia at the Fernie Memorial Arena.

The Kootenay Conference All-Stars defeated the Okanagan/Shuswap Conference All-Stars 10-3.

Mike Wiest (F) of the Castlegar Rebels was the Kootenay Conference Player Of The Game with 3 points and scored the Game Winning Goal.

Garrett Rockafellow (G) of the Revelstoke Grizzlies was the Okanagan/Shuswap Player Of The Game.

== Standings ==
=== Kootenay Conference ===
	Eddie Mountain Division	GP	W	L	T	OTL	GF	GA	Pts
1	Fernie Ghostriders	50	42	5	0	3	265	118	87
2	Creston Valley Thunder Cats	50	26	19	3	2	169	170	57
3	Golden Rockets	50	22	26	0	2	221	233	46
4	Kimberley Dynamiters	50	18	28	2	2	185	234	40
5	Columbia Valley Rockies	50	11	35	0	4	134	243	26

	Neil Murdoch Division	GP	W	L	T	OTL	GF	GA	Pts
1	Castlegar Rebels	50	42	8	0	0	242	120	84
2	Beaver Valley Nitehawks	50	32	13	1	4	202	170	69
3	Nelson Leafs	50	25	22	0	3	173	187	53
4	Spokane Braves	50	21	26	1	2	170	171	45
5	Grand Forks Border Bruins	50	8	41	0	1	145	267	17

=== Okanagan/Shuswap Conference ===
	Doug Birks Division	GP	W	L	T	OTL	GF	GA	Pts
1	Revelstoke Grizzlies	50	40	9	0	1	225	141	81
2	Kamloops Storm	50	24	24	0	2	165	169	50
4	Sicamous Eagles	50	17	27	2	4	167	194	40
3	North Okanagan Knights	50	18	30	1	1	146	198	38

	Okanagan Division	GP	W	L	T	OTL	GF	GA	Pts
1	Osoyoos Coyotes	50	42	2	2	4	257	110	90
2	Kelowna Chiefs	50	26	21	1	2	178	176	55
3	Princeton Posse	50	16	28	3	3	147	203	38
4	Penticton Lakers	50	12	37	0	1	128	215	25

== Playoffs ==
=== Bracket ===
Division Semifinals	Division Finals
EM1	Fernie	4
EM4	Kimberley	0
EM1	Fernie	4
Eddie Mountain Division
EM2	Creston Valley	3
EM2	Creston Valley	4
EM3	Golden	2
Kootenay Conference
NM1	Castlegar	4
NM4	Spokane	1
NM1	Castlegar	4
Neil Murdoch Division
NM2	Beaver Valley	1
NM2	Beaver Valley	4
NM3	Nelson	3
DB1	Revelstoke	4
DB4	North Okanagan	1
DB1	Revelstoke	4
Doug Birks Division
DB2	Kamloops	1
DB2	Kamloops	4
DB3	Sicamous	1
Okanagan Conference
O1	Osoyoos	4
O4	Penticton	0
O1	Osoyoos	4
Okanagan Division
O2	Kelowna	0
O2	Kelowna	4
O3	Princeton	3

Conference Finals
EM1	Fernie	2
NM1	Castlegar	4
DB1	Revelstoke	2
O1	Osoyoos	4

KIJHL Championship Final
NM1	Castlegar	2
O1	Osoyoos	4

== Division Semifinals ==
=== Eddie Mountain Division Semifinals ===
==== (EM1) Fernie Ghostriders vs. (EM4) Kimberley Dynamiters ====
February 15	Fernie Ghostriders	12–3	Kimberley Dynamiters	Fernie Memorial Arena	Recap
Andrew Walton 12 saves / 15 shots		Goalie stats	Kevin Jacyna 44 saves / 56 shots

February 16	Kimberley Dynamiters	1–7	Fernie Ghostriders	Kimberley Civic Centre	Recap
Jeremy Mousseau 35 saves / 42 shots		Goalie stats	Andrew Walton 19 saves / 20 shots

February 19	Fernie Ghostriders	9–3	Kimberley Dynamiters	Fernie Memorial Arena	Recap
Andrew Walton 16 saves / 19 shots		Goalie stats	Jeremy Mousseau 20 saves / 27 shots Wes Mcleod 6 saves / 8 shots

February 20	Kimberley Dynamiters	1–5	Fernie Ghostriders	Kimberley Civic Centre	Recap
Wes Mcleod 31 saves / 35 shots		Goalie stats	Andrew Walton 24 saves / 25 shots

Fernie won series 4–0

==== (EM2) Creston Valley Thunder Cats vs. (EM3) Golden Rockets ====
February 14	Creston Valley Thunder Cats	3–4	Golden Rockets	Johnny Bucyk Arena	Recap
Weston Joseph 38 saves / 42 shots		Goalie stats	James Leonard 31 saves / 34 shots

February 15	Creston Valley Thunder Cats	6-2	Golden Rockets	Johnny Bucyk Arena	Recap
Weston Joseph 36 saves / 38 shots		Goalie stats	James Leonard 28 saves / 34 shots

February 17	Golden Rockets	2–3	OT	Creston Valley Thunder Cats	Golden Arena	Recap
James Leonard 35 saves / 38 shots		Goalie stats		Weston Joseph 27 saves / 29 shots

February 18	Golden Rockets	2–3	Creston Valley Thunder Cats	Golden Arena	Recap
James Leonard 26 saves / 29 shots		Goalie stats	Weston Joseph 37 saves / 39 shots

February 19	Creston Valley Thunder Cats	4-5	Golden Rockets	Johnny Bucyk Arena	Recap
Weston Joseph 33 saves / 38 shots		Goalie stats	Crossland Wass 16 saves / 17 shots James Leonard 5 saves / 8 shots

February 21	Golden Rockets	1-7	Creston Valley Thunder Cats	Golden Arena	Recap
Crossland Wass 14 saves / 18 shots James Leonard 13 saves / 16 shots		Goalie stats	Weston Joseph 23 saves / 24 shots

Creston Valley won series 4–2

=== Neil Murdoch Division Semifinals ===
==== (NM1) Castlegar Rebels vs. (NM4) Spokane Braves ====
February 14	Castlegar Rebels	5–1	Spokane Braves	Castlegar Complex	Recap
Alex Ross 26 saves / 27 shots		Goalie stats	Garrett Barr 33 saves / 38 shots

February 15	Castlegar Rebels	7-6	OT	Spokane Braves	Castlegar Complex	Recap
Alex Ross 21 saves / 27 shots		Goalie stats		Garrett Barr 39 saves / 46 shots

February 17	Spokane Braves	4-0	Castlegar Rebels	Eagles Ice-A-Rena	Recap
Garrett Barr 37 saves / 37 shots		Goalie stats	Alex Ross 25 saves / 28 shots

February 18	Spokane Braves	1–2	OT	Castlegar Rebels	Eagles Ice-A-Rena	Recap
Garrett Barr 38 saves / 40 shots		Goalie stats		Cole Buckley 38 saves / 39 shots

February 20	Castlegar Rebels	6–2	Spokane Braves	Castlegar Complex	Recap
Cole Buckley 29 saves / 31 shots		Goalie stats	Garrett Barr 45 saves / 51 shots

Castlegar won series 4–1

==== (NM2) Beaver Valley Nitehawks vs. (NM3) Nelson Leafs ====
February 15	Beaver Valley Nitehawks	13-2	Nelson Leafs	Beaver Valley Arena	Recap
Mike Vlanich 29 saves / 27 shots		Goalie stats	Marcus Beesley 17 saves / 24 shots Nick Broessler 7 saves / 13 shots

February 16	Beaver Valley Nitehawks	4-2	Nelson Leafs	Beaver Valley Arena	Recap
Mike Vlanich 33 saves / 35 shots		Goalie stats	Marcus Beesley 35 saves / 38 shots

February 18	Nelson Leafs	5-3	Beaver Valley Nitehawks	Nelson Community Complex	Recap
Marcus Beesley 20 saves / 23 shots		Goalie stats	Mike Vlanich 34 saves / 38 shots

February 19	Nelson Leafs	9-1	Beaver Valley Nitehawks	Nelson Community Complex	Recap
Marcus Beesley 26 saves / 27 shots		Goalie stats	Zach Perehudoff 21 saves / 27 shots Mike Vlanich 5 saves / 8 shots

February 21	Beaver Valley Nitehawks	6–3	Nelson Leafs	Beaver Valley Arena	Recap
Mike Vlanich 33 saves / 36 shots		Goalie stats	Marcus Beesley 27 saves / 33 shots

February 22	Nelson Leafs	5-4	Beaver Valley Nitehawks	Nelson Community Complex	Recap
Marcus Beesley 21 saves / 25 shots		Goalie stats	Mike Vlanich 24 saves / 29 shots

February 23	Beaver Valley Nitehawks	4-2	Nelson Leafs	Beaver Valley Arena	Recap
Mike Vlanich 25 saves / 27 shots		Goalie stats	Marcus Beesley 28 saves / 31 shots

Beaver Valley won series 4–3

=== Doug Birks Division Semifinals ===
==== (DB1) Revelstoke Grizzlies vs. (DB4) North Okanagan Knights ====
February 14	Revelstoke Grizzlies	4–0	North Okanagan Knights	Revelstoke Forum	Recap
Tory Caldwell 39 saves / 39 shots		Goalie stats	Chris Hurry 35 saves / 39 shots

February 15	Revelstoke Grizzlies	4-2	North Okanagan Knights	Revelstoke Forum	Recap
Tory Caldwell 31 saves / 33 shots		Goalie stats	Chris Solecki 28 saves / 31 shots Chris Hurry 0 saves / 1 shots

February 17	North Okanagan Knights	2-4	Revelstoke Grizzlies	Nor-Val Centre	Recap
Chris Solecki 20 saves / 24 shots		Goalie stats	Tory Caldwell 20 saves / 22 shots

February 18	North Okanagan Knights	4-3	OT	Revelstoke Grizzlies	Nor-Val Centre	Recap
Chris Solecki 29 saves / 32 shots		Goalie stats		Tory Caldwell 24 saves / 28 shots

February 20	Revelstoke Grizzlies	6–3	North Okanagan Knights	Revelstoke Forum	Recap
Tory Caldwell 17 saves / 20 shots		Goalie stats	Chris Solecki 43 saves / 49 shots

Revelstoke won series 4–1

==== (DB2) Kamloops Storm vs. (DB3) Sicamous Eagles ====
February 14	Kamloops Storm	3-5	Sicamous Eagles	McArthur Park Arena	Recap
Lynden Stanwood 26 saves / 31 shots		Goalie stats	Chris Kingdon 28 saves / 51 shots

February 15	Kamloops Storm	11-2	Sicamous Eagles	McArthur Park Arena	Recap
Lynden Stanwood 30 saves / 32 shots		Goalie stats	Chris Kingdon 44 saves / 53 shots Aaron Brandoli 4 saves / 6 shots

February 17	Sicamous Eagles	1-2	OT	Kamloops Storm	Sicamous & District Recreation Centre	Recap
Chris Kingdon 24 saves / 26 shots		Goalie stats		Lynden Stanwood 29 saves / 30 shots

February 18	Sicamous Eagles	3-5	Kamloops Storm	Sicamous & District Recreation Centre	Recap
Chris Kingdon 22 saves / 25 shots		Goalie stats	Lynden Stanwood 22 saves / 25 shots

February 20	Kamloops Storm	5-4	Sicamous Eagles	McArthur Park Arena	Recap
Lynden Stanwood 24 saves / 28 shots		Goalie stats	Chris Kingdon 29 saves / 34 shots

Kamloops won series 4–1

=== Okanagan Division Semifinals ===
==== (O1) Osoyoos Coyotes vs. (O4) Penticton Lakers ====
February 15	Osoyoos Coyotes	3-2	Penticton Lakers	Osoyoos Sun Bowl	Recap
Kyle Laslo 24 saves / 26 shots		Goalie stats	Jessie Gordichuk 41 saves / 44 shots

February 16	Penticton Lakers	0-6	Osoyoos Coyotes	South Okanagan Events Center	Recap
Jessie Gordichuk 32 saves / 38 shots		Goalie stats	Kyle Laslo 21 saves / 21 shots

February 18	Penticton Lakers	1-6	Osoyoos Coyotes	South Okanagan Events Center	Recap
Jessie Gordichuk 26 saves / 32 shots		Goalie stats	Kyle Laslo 26 saves / 27 shots

February 19	Osoyoos Coyotes	3-1	Penticton Lakers	Osoyoos Sun Bowl	Recap
Kyle Laslo 15 saves / 16 shots		Goalie stats	Jacob Mattes 32 saves / 35 shots

Osoyoos won series 4–0

==== (O2) Kelowna Chiefs vs. (O3) Princeton Posse ====
February 14	Kelowna Chiefs	4-6	Princeton Posse	Rutland Arena	Recap
Conor Barrie 26 saves / 32 shots		Goalie stats	Brett Patchett 30 saves / 34 shots

February 15	Kelowna Chiefs	2-5	Princeton Posse	Rutland Arena	Recap
Jordan Bytelaar 26 saves / 31 shots		Goalie stats	Brett Patchett 31 saves / 33 shots

February 17	Princeton Posse	3-7	Kelowna Chiefs	Princeton & District Arena	Recap
Brett Patchett 24 saves / 30 shots		Goalie stats	Jordan Bytelaar 25 saves / 28 shots

February 18	Princeton Posse	7-6	Kelowna Chiefs	Princeton & District Arena	Recap
Brett Patchett 29 saves / 35 shots		Goalie stats	Jordan Bytelaar 27 saves / 33 shots Conor Barrie 4 saves / 5 shots

February 19	Kelowna Chiefs	6–3	Princeton Posse	Rutland Arena	Recap
Jordan Bytelaar 34 saves / 37 shots		Goalie stats	Brett Patchett 27 saves / 31 shots Brett Patchett 2 saves / 5 shots

February 21	Princeton Posse	1-7	Kelowna Chiefs	Princeton & District Arena	Recap
Sky Buller 27 saves / 30 shots		Goalie stats	Jordan Bytelaar 32 saves / 33 shots

February 22	Kelowna Chiefs	6-4	Princeton Posse	Rutland Arena	Recap
Jordan Bytelaar 36 saves / 41 shots		Goalie stats	Brett Patchett 27 saves / 32 shots

Kelowna won series 4–3

== Division Finals ==
=== Eddie Mountain Division Finals ===
==== (EM1) Fernie Ghostriders vs. (EM2) Creston Valley Thunder Cats ====
February 25	Fernie Ghostriders	3-1	Creston Valley Thunder Cats	Fernie Memorial Arena	Recap
Andrew Walton 20 saves / 21 shots		Goalie stats	Weston Joseph 35 saves / 37 shots

February 26	Fernie Ghostriders	2–5	Creston Valley Thunder Cats	Fernie Memorial Arena	Recap
Andrew Walton 17 saves / 22 shots		Goalie stats	Weston Joseph 29 saves / 31 shots

February 28	Creston Valley Thunder Cats	4-6	Fernie Ghostriders	Johnny Bucyk Arena	Recap
Weston Joseph 34 saves / 38 shots		Goalie stats	Andrew Walton 24 saves / 28 shots

March 1	Creston Valley Thunder Cats	2-1	Fernie Ghostriders	Johnny Bucyk Arena	Recap
Weston Joseph 40 saves / 41 shots		Goalie stats	Andrew Walton 29 saves / 31 shots

March 3	Fernie Ghostriders	3-1	Creston Valley Thunder Cats	Fernie Memorial Arena	Recap
Andrew Walton 23 saves / 24 shots		Goalie stats	Weston Joseph 34 saves / 37 shots

March 4	Creston Valley Thunder Cats	5-4	OT	Fernie Ghostriders	Johnny Bucyk Arena	Recap
Weston Joseph 37 saves / 41 shots		Goalie stats		Andrew Walton 31 saves / 36 shots

March 5	Fernie Ghostriders	3-1	Creston Valley Thunder Cats	Fernie Memorial Arena	Recap
Andrew Walton 24 saves / 25 shots		Goalie stats	Weston Joseph 25 saves / 27 shots

Fernie won series 4–3

=== Neil Murdoch Division Finals ===
==== (NM1) Castlegar Rebels vs. (NM2) Beaver Valley Nitehawks ====
February 25	Castlegar Rebels	6-2	Beaver Valley Nitehawks	Castlegar Complex	Recap
Cole Buckley 18 saves / 20 shots		Goalie stats	Zach Perehudoff 14 saves / 15 shots Mike Vlanich 9 saves / 14 shots

February 26	Castlegar Rebels	6-7	Beaver Valley Nitehawks	Castlegar Complex	Recap
Andrew Walton 17 saves / 22 shots		Goalie stats	Mike Vlanich 32 saves / 38 shots

February 28	Beaver Valley Nitehawks	3-6	Castlegar Rebels	Beaver Valley Arena	Recap
Mike Vlanich 37 saves / 43 shots		Goalie stats	Alex Ross 11 saves / 14 shots

March 1	Beaver Valley Nitehawks	3-4	Castlegar Rebels	Beaver Valley Arena	Recap
Zach Perehudoff 22 saves / 26 shots		Goalie stats	Alex Ross 11 saves / 14 shots

March 3	Castlegar Rebels	4-2	Beaver Valley Nitehawks	Castlegar Complex	Recap
Alex Ross 23 saves / 25 shots		Goalie stats	Mike Vlanich 33 saves / 37 shots

Castlegar won series 4–1

=== Doug Birks Division Finals ===
==== (DB1) Revelstoke Grizzlies vs. (DB2) Kamloops Storm ====
February 24	Revelstoke Grizzlies	6-3	Kamloops Storm	Revelstoke Forum	Recap
Tory Caldwell 29 saves / 32 shots		Goalie stats	Lynden Stanwood 50 saves / 56 shots

February 25	Revelstoke Grizzlies	3-2	Kamloops Storm	Revelstoke Forum	Recap
Tory Caldwell 40 saves / 42 shots		Goalie stats	Lynden Stanwood 50 saves / 53 shots

February 27	Kamloops Storm	7-2	Revelstoke Grizzlies	McArthur Park Arena	Recap
Lynden Stanwood 25 saves / 27 shots		Goalie stats	Tory Caldwell 13 saves / 17 shots Garrett Rockafellow 3 saves / 6 shots

February 28	Kamloops Storm	2-6	Revelstoke Grizzlies	McArthur Park Arena	Recap
Lynden Stanwood 36 saves / 42 shots		Goalie stats	Tory Caldwell 50 saves / 52 shots

March 2	Revelstoke Grizzlies	10-4	Kamloops Storm	Revelstoke Forum	Recap
Tory Caldwell 8 saves / 9 shots Garrett Rockafellow 13 saves / 16 shots		Goalie stats	Lynden Stanwood 20 saves / 26 shots Wade Moyls 22 saves / 26 shots

Revelstoke won series 4–1

=== Okanagan Division Finals ===
==== (O1) Osoyoos Coyotes vs. (O2) Kelowna Chiefs ====
February 25	Osoyoos Coyotes	5-2	Kelowna Chiefs	Osoyoos Sun Bowl	Recap
Kyle Laslo 17 saves / 19 shots		Goalie stats	Jordan Bytelaar 36 saves / 41 shots

February 26	Osoyoos Coyotes	5-0	Kelowna Chiefs	Osoyoos Sun Bowl	Recap
Kyle Laslo 16 saves / 16 shots		Goalie stats	Conor Barrie 35 saves / 40 shots

February 27	Kelowna Chiefs	2-3	2OT	Osoyoos Coyotes	Rutland Arena	Recap
Jordan Bytelaar 40 saves / 43 shots		Goalie stats		Kyle Laslo 27 saves / 29 shots

March 1	Kelowna Chiefs	0-5	Osoyoos Coyotes	Rutland Arena	Recap
Jordan Bytelaar 33 saves / 38 shots		Goalie stats	Kyle Laslo 19 saves / 19 shots

Osoyoos won series 4–0

== Conference Finals ==
=== Kootenay Conference Final ===
==== (EM1) Fernie Ghostriders vs. (NM1) Castlegar Rebels ====
March 7	Fernie Ghostriders	4-8	Castlegar Rebels	Fernie Memorial Arena	Recap
Andrew Walton 18 saves / 24 shots Fraser Abdallah 10 saves / 12 shots		Goalie stats	Alex Ross 27 saves / 31 shots

March 8	Fernie Ghostriders	5-2	Castlegar Rebels	Fernie Memorial Arena	Recap
Andrew Walton 20 saves / 22 shots		Goalie stats	Alex Ross 34 saves / 39 shots Cole Buckley 2 saves / 2 shots

March 10	Castlegar Rebels	5-3	Fernie Ghostriders	Castlegar Complex	Recap
Alex Ross 33 saves / 36 shots		Goalie stats	Andrew Walton 24 saves / 28 shots

March 12	Castlegar Rebels	3-1	Fernie Ghostriders	Castlegar Complex	Recap
Alex Ross 31 saves / 32 shots		Goalie stats	Andrew Walton 29 saves / 31 shots

March 14	Fernie Ghostriders	4-2	Castlegar Rebels	Fernie Memorial Arena	Recap
Andrew Walton 21 saves / 23 shots		Goalie stats	Alex Ross 26 saves / 30 shots

March 15	Castlegar Rebels	5-2	Fernie Ghostriders	Castlegar Complex	Recap
Alex Ross 19 saves / 21 shots		Goalie stats	Andrew Walton 20 saves / 25 shots

Castlegar won series 4–2

=== Okanagan Conference Final ===
==== (O1) Osoyoos Coyotes vs. (DB1) Revelstoke Grizzlies ====
March 6	Osoyoos Coyotes	2-8	Revelstoke Grizzlies	Osoyoos Sun Bowl	Recap
Kyle Laslo 17 saves / 23 shots Shanson Lunny 8 saves / 10 shots		Goalie stats	Tory Caldwell 38 saves / 40 shots

March 7	Osoyoos Coyotes	3-2	OT	Revelstoke Grizzlies	Osoyoos Sun Bowl	Recap
Kyle Laslo 25 saves / 27 shots		Goalie stats		Tory Caldwell 27 saves / 30 shots

March 9	Revelstoke Grizzlies	1-2	Osoyoos Coyotes	Revelstoke Forum	Recap
Tory Caldwell 41 saves / 43 shots		Goalie stats	Kyle Laslo 28 saves / 29 shots

March 10	Revelstoke Grizzlies	2-1	2OT	Osoyoos Coyotes	Revelstoke Forum	Recap
Tory Caldwell 59 saves / 60 shots		Goalie stats		Kyle Laslo 49 saves / 51 shots

March 12	Osoyoos Coyotes	4-2	Revelstoke Grizzlies	Osoyoos Sun Bowl	Recap
Kyle Laslo 29 saves / 31 shots		Goalie stats	Tory Caldwell 30 saves / 34 shots

March 13	Revelstoke Grizzlies	2-4	Osoyoos Coyotes	Revelstoke Forum	Recap
Tory Caldwell 42 saves / 46 shots		Goalie stats	Kyle Laslo 49 saves / 51 shots

Osoyoos won series 4–2

== KIJHL Championship Final ==
=== (O1) Osoyoos Coyotes vs. (NM1) Castlegar Rebels ===
March 19	Osoyoos Coyotes	2-1	Castlegar Rebels	Osoyoos Sun Bowl	Recap
Kyle Laslo 25 saves / 26 shots		Goalie stats	Alex Ross 23 saves / 25 shots

March 20	Osoyoos Coyotes	3-2	Castlegar Rebels	Osoyoos Sun Bowl	Recap
Kyle Laslo 23 saves / 25 shots		Goalie stats	Alex Ross 26 saves / 29 shots

March 22	Castlegar Rebels	2-1	OT	Osoyoos Coyotes	Castlegar Complex	Recap
Alex Ross 19 saves / 20 shots		Goalie stats		Kyle Laslo 29 saves / 31 shots

March 23	Castlegar Rebels	2-0	Osoyoos Coyotes	Castlegar Complex	Recap
Alex Ross 21 saves / 21 shots		Goalie stats	Kyle Laslo 26 saves / 28 shots

March 25	Osoyoos Coyotes	4-2	Castlegar Rebels	Osoyoos Sun Bowl	Recap
Kyle Laslo 26 saves / 28 shots		Goalie stats	Alex Ross 34 saves / 37 shots

March 26	Castlegar Rebels	1-7	Osoyoos Coyotes	Castlegar Complex	Recap
Alex Ross ?? saves / ?? shots		Goalie stats	Kyle Laslo ?? saves / ?? shots

Osoyoos won series 4–2

== KIJHL awards ==
2010–11 KIJHL awards
Award	Recipient(s)
KIJHL Championship	Osoyoos Coyotes
Regular Season Champions	Osoyoos Coyotes (42-2-2-4, 90 Pts.)
Regular Season Kootenay Champions	Fernie Ghostriders (42-5-0-3, 87 Pts.)
Regular Season Okanagan/Shuswap Champions	Osoyoos Coyotes (42-2-2-4, 90 Pts.)
Regular Season Eddie Mountain Champions	Fernie Ghostriders (42-5-0-3, 87 Pts.)
Regular Season Neil Murdoch Champions	Castlegar Rebels (42-8-0-0, 84 Pts.)
Regular Season Doug Birks Champions	Revelstoke Grizzlies (40-9-0-1, 81 Pts.)
Regular Season Okanagan Champions	Osoyoos Coyotes (42-2-2-4, 90 Pts.)
Top Defenceman	Jeff Zmurchyk (Fernie Ghostriders)
Most Sportsmanlike	Ryon Sookro (Beaver Valley Nitehawks)
Most Valuable	Scott Morisseau (Fernie Ghostriders)
Top Rookie	Shane Hanna (Osoyoos Coyotes)
Coach of the year	Ken Law (Osoyoos Coyotes)
Top Scorer	Scott Morisseau (Fernie Ghostriders)
Top Goaltender	Kyle Laslo (Osoyoos Coyotes)

== Player stats ==
=== Scoring leaders ===
The following players led the league in points at the conclusion of the regular season.

GP = Games played; G = Goals; A = Assists; Pts = Points; PIM = Penalty minutes

Player	Team	GP	G	A	Pts	PIM
Scott Morisseau	Fernie Ghostriders	50	42	55	97	30
Thomas Abenante	Fernie Ghostriders	47	28	64	92	114
Thierry Martine	Osoyoos Coyotes	50	45	46	91	53
Stefan Jensen	Osoyoos Coyotes	50	46	41	87	63
Joshua MacDonald	Golden Rockets	47	36	42	78	70
Tyler Fairall	Golden Rockets	50	41	35	76	48
Cale Wright	Fernie Ghostriders	45	33	39	72	78
Ryan Aynsley	Castlegar Rebels	38	32	39	71	73
Zachary Thompson	Grand Forks Border Bruins	49	34	29	63	48
Darrell Boldon	Kimberley Dynamiters	50	33	30	63	80

=== Leading goaltenders ===
The following goaltenders led the league in goals against average at the end of the regular season.

GP = Games played; Min = Minutes played; W = Wins; L = Losses; T = Ties; GA = Goals against; SO = Shutouts; SV% = Save percentage; GAA = Goals against average

Player	Team	GP	Min	W	L	T	GA	SO	SV%	GAA
Kyle Laslo	Osoyoos Coyotes	38	2,258	32	3	2	72	7	.933	1.91
Alex Ross	Castlegar Rebels	20	1,179	17	3	0	40	3	.921	2.04
Fraser Abdallah	Fernie Ghostriders	23	1,272	19	3	0	44	1	.911	2.08
Andrew Walton	Fernie Ghostriders	32	1,907	25	6	0	73	4	.912	2.30
Garrett Rockafellow	Revelstoke Grizzlies	22	1,114	15	5	0	53	1	.911	2.85
Mckinlee Baum	Spokane Braves	16	824	7	7	0	40	0	.896	2.91
Cole Buckley	Castlegar Rebels	32	1,805	25	4	1	89	1	.900	2.96
Ryan Waldhaus	Creston Valley Thunder Cats	16	887	10	4	0	45	1	.894	3.04
Mike Vlanich	Beaver Valley Nitehawks	34	1,999	21	10	1	104	2	.903	3.12
Lynden Stanwood	Kamloops Storm	36	1,999	18	15	1	106	5	.912	3.18

== Playoff player stats ==
=== Scoring leaders ===
The following players led the league in points at the conclusion of the playoffs.

GP = Games played; G = Goals; A = Assists; Pts = Points; PIM = Penalty minutes

Player	Team	GP	G	A	Pts	PIM
Scott Morisseau	Fernie Ghostriders	17	15	19	34	10
Ryan Aynsley	Castlegar Rebels	21	15	17	32	24
Thomas Abenante	Fernie Ghostriders	16	9	22	31	20
Luke Richardson	Fernie Ghostriders	17	8	19	27	8
Bruce Silvera	Revelstoke Grizzlies	16	13	12	25	6
Thierry Martine	Osoyoos Coyotes	19	10	13	23	22
Brad Friedrich	Revelstoke Grizzlies	16	7	15	22	12
Spencer Brodt	Castlegar Rebels	21	13	8	21	60
Taylor Anderson	Castlegar Rebels	20	9	11	20	36
Jamie Vlanich	Castlegar Rebels	21	4	16	20	8

=== Leading goaltenders ===
The following goaltenders led the league in goals against average at the end of the playoffs.

GP = Games played; Min = Minutes played; W = Wins; L = Losses; T = Ties; GA = Goals against; SO = Shutouts; SV% = Save percentage; GAA = Goals against average

Player	Team	GP	Min	W	L	T	GA	SO	SV%	GAA
Kyle Laslo	Osoyoos Coyotes	19	1,161	15	4	0	31	3	.941	1.60
Tory Caldwell	Revelstoke Grizzlies	16	959	10	6	0	39	1	.929	2.44
Weston Joseph	Creston Valley Thunder Cats	13	787	7	6	0	34	0	.926	2.59
Cole Buckley	Castlegar Rebels	6	242	3	1	0	11	0	.913	2.72
Alex Ross	Castlegar Rebels	18	1,015	11	6	0	48	1	.897	2.84
Andrew Walton	Fernie Ghostriders	17	1,012	10	7	0	48	0	.885	2.85
Jordan Bytelaar	Kelowna Chiefs	10	548	4	4	0	34	0	.897	3.72
Lynden Stanwood	Kamloops Storm	10	588	5	5	0	38	0	.891	3.88
Chris Solecki	North Okanagan Knights	4	242	1	3	0	16	0	.882	3.97
Garrett Barr	Spokane Braves	5	302	1	4	0	20	1	.906	3.97

== Suspensions ==
Date	Name	Team	Offense	Length
January 31, 2011	Josh Garneau	Fernie Ghostriders	Gross misconduct.	3 Games
February 3, 2011	Mike McCance	Kamloops Storm	Multiple game misconducts.	2 Games
February 5, 2011	Mikel Brewer	Grand Forks Border Bruins	Game misconduct issued in last 10 minutes of the game.	1 Game
February 5, 2011	Brett Dallen	Kamloops Storm	Checking to head and a game misconduct.	2 Games
February 5, 2011	Josh Rasmussen	Kamloops Storm	Game misconduct issued in last 10 minutes of the game.	1 Game
February 5, 2011	Dylan Richardson	Kamloops Storm	Checking from behind and a game misconduct.	2 Games
February 5, 2011	Catlin McLeod	Kelowna Chiefs	Multiple fights in the same stoppage.	1 Game
February 5, 2011	Branden Redschlag	Kelowna Chiefs	Game misconduct issued in last 10 minutes of the game.	1 Game
February 5, 2011	Jason Bell	Osoyoos Coyotes	Checking from behind and match penalties.	4 Games
February 5, 2011	Jake Newton	Osoyoos Coyotes	Multiple fights in the same stoppage.	1 Game
February 5, 2011	Tim Martens	Princeton Posse	Game misconduct issued in last 10 minutes of the game.	1 Game
February 5, 2011	Nick Farmer	Spokane Braves	Game misconduct issued in last 10 minutes of the game.	1 Game
February 5, 2011	Joe Martin (Coach)	Creston Valley Thunder Cats	To many fights in a game.	4 Games
February 5, 2011	Brock Ward	Creston Valley Thunder Cats	Multiple fights in the same stoppage and a game misconduct.	3 Games
February 5, 2011	Kane Dawe	Creston Valley Thunder Cats	Game misconduct issued in last 10 minutes of the game.	1 Game
February 5, 2011	Jordan Johnson	Creston Valley Thunder Cats	Game misconduct issued in last 10 minutes of the game.	1 Game
February 5, 2011	Weston Joseph (Goalie)	Creston Valley Thunder Cats	Multiple fights, Goaltender fighting.	2 Games
February 5, 2011	Will Verner (Coach)	Fernie Ghostriders	To many fights in a game.	2 Games
February 5, 2011	Marty Wicks	Fernie Ghostriders	Game misconduct issued in last 10 minutes of the game.	1 Game
February 5, 2011	Jeff Zmurchyk	Fernie Ghostriders	Game misconduct issued in last 10 minutes of the game.	1 Game
February 5, 2011	Andrew Walton (Goalie)	Fernie Ghostriders	Multiple fights, Goaltender fighting.	3 Games
February 6, 2011	Steven Garcia	Penticton Lakers	Gross misconduct.	3 Games
February 7, 2011	Zachary Baba	Fernie Ghostriders	Gross misconduct.	6 Games
February 12, 2011	Kurt Torbohm	Kamloops Storm	Game misconduct issued in last 10 minutes of the game.	1 Game
February 12, 2011	Jordan McCallum	Penticton Lakers	Match penalty.	3 Games
February 15, 2011	Olli Dickson	Kimberley Dynamiters	Major goaltender interference.	2 Games
February 15, 2011	Steven Pantazopoulos	North Okanagan Knights	2 game misconducts issued in last 10 minutes of the game.	2 Games
February 16, 2011	Cody Boekestyn	Kimberley Dynamiters	Game misconduct issued in last 10 minutes of the game.	1 Game
February 16, 2011	Rylan Duley	Kimberley Dynamiters	Game misconduct issued in last 10 minutes of the game.	1 Game
February 16, 2011	Senate Patton	Kimberley Dynamiters	Match penalty.	3 Games
March 14, 2011	Connor Morgan	Fernie Ghostriders	Checking from behind & game misconduct.	1 Game

== Trades ==
April 1, 2010	To Columbia Valley Rockies Matt MacDonald; Darrell Boldon	To Fernie Ghostriders Future considerations
April 9, 2010	To Kerry Park Islanders (VIJHL) Kaydon Trumbley	To Fernie Ghostriders Future considerations
April 30, 2010	To Creston Valley Thunder Cats Lukas Simpson	To Peninsula Panthers (VIJHL) Future considerations
May 31, 2010	To Fernie Ghostriders Tyrell Turgeon	To Peninsula Panthers (VIJHL) Zach Fridella
June 3, 2010	To Fernie Ghostriders Matthew Johnson	To Squamish Wolfpack (PIJHL) Future considerations
July 13, 2010	To Fernie Ghostriders Sean Maktaak	To Creston Valley Thunder Cats Future considerations
July 15, 2010	To Abbotsford Pilots (PIJHL) Chris Vinette	To Grand Forks Border Bruins Future considerations
July 15, 2010	To Kerry Park Islanders (VIJHL) Jake Newman	To Grand Forks Border Bruins Future considerations
July 23, 2010	To Fernie Ghostriders Jamie Vlanich	To Golden Rockets Future considerations
August 1, 2010	To Fernie Ghostriders Jordie Cool	To Kelowna Chiefs Future considerations
August 4, 2010	To Grand Forks Border Bruins Zack Maclellan; Jordan Groenheyde	To Columbia Valley Rockies Jake Halderman
August 17, 2010	To Oceanside Generals (VIJHL) Matt Dixon	To Creston Valley Thunder Cats Future considerations
August 30, 2010	To Kamloops Storm Brody Moen	To Creston Valley Thunder Cats Future considerations
September 2, 2010	To Grand Forks Border Bruins Joey Cormano	To Campbell River Storm (VIJHL) Future considerations
September 2, 2010	To Fernie Ghostriders Scott Morisseau	To Beaver Valley Nitehawks Future considerations
September 3, 2010	To Creston Valley Thunder Cats Ryan Garber	To Grand Forks Border Bruins Future considerations
September 9, 2010	To Kimberley Dynamiters Soren Hills	To Grand Forks Border Bruins Chad Filatoff; Tyler McDowell
September 15, 2010	To Fernie Ghostriders Thomas Abenante	To Beaver Valley Nitehawks Future considerations
September 15, 2010	To Kerry Park Islanders (VIJHL) Hayden Capuozzo	To Fernie Ghostriders Future considerations
September 15, 2010	To Spokane Braves RJ Preisser	To Fernie Ghostriders Future considerations
September 15, 2010	To North Peace Navigators (NWJHL) Kevin Monfette; Jared Cardinal	To Fernie Ghostriders Future considerations
September 20, 2010	To Mission Icebreakers (PIJHL) Lukas Simpson	To Creston Valley Thunder Cats Future considerations
September 20, 2010	To Osoyoos Coyotes Brandon Watson	To Grand Forks Border Bruins Future considerations
September 28, 2010	To Southern Oregon Spartans (NORPAC) Dean Wilson	To Fernie Ghostriders Future considerations
September 28, 2010	To Columbia Valley Rockies Kevan Mikkelsen; Devin Bell	To Fernie Ghostriders Future considerations
October 5, 2010	To Kelowna Chiefs Quinn Gallacher	To North Okanagan Knights Future considerations
October 7, 2010	To Fernie Ghostriders Conner Morgan	To Oceanside Generals (VIJHL) Stephen Wolff
October 8, 2010	To Strathmore Wheatland Kings (HJHL) Ross Fox	To Fernie Ghostriders Future considerations
October 14, 2010	To Nelson Leafs Kyle Alexander	To Flin Flon Bombers (SJHL) Cash
October 19, 2010	To Beaver Valley Nitehawks Keanan Patershuk; Daniel Bishop; Nick Perez	To Fernie Ghostriders Completes the future considerations owed to the Beaver Valley Nighthawks for Thomas Abenante (Sep. 15 trade)
October 21, 2010	To Sicamous Eagles David Harrison	To Kelowna Chiefs Future considerations
October 26, 2010	To Grand Forks Border Bruins Cody Larsen	To Revelstoke Grizzlies Future considerations
November 9, 2010	To Kimberley Dynamiters Darrell Bolden	To Columbia Valley Rockies Cash
November 9, 2010	To Kimberley Dynamiters Rick Soo	To North Okanagan Knights Cash
November 15, 2010	To Creston Valley Thunder Cats Brandon Parrone	To Osoyoos Coyotes Mattew Guerts
November 15, 2010	To Creston Valley Thunder Cats Weston Joseph	To Princeton Posse Cameron Weir
November 24, 2010	To North Okanagan Knights Thomas Swales	To Osoyoos Coyotes Future considerations
November 29, 2010	To Sicamous Eagles Max Mois	To Comox Valley Glacier Kings (VIJHL) Future considerations
November 30, 2010	To Fernie Ghostriders Andrew Walton	To Castlegar Rebels Mike Wiest; Jamie Vlanich
November 30, 2010	To Saanich Braves (VIJHL) Zach Traverse	To Fernie Ghostriders Future considerations
December 1, 2010	To Osoyoos Coyotes Matt Ridley	To Castlegar Rebels Future considerations
December 2, 2010	To Creston Valley Thunder Cats Brandon Formosa	To Sicamous Eagles Future considerations
December 25, 2010	To Fernie Ghostriders Luke Richardson	To Kelowna Chiefs Future considerations
January 7, 2011	To Creston Valley Thunder Cats Brandon Formosa	To Nelson Leafs Future considerations
January 10, 2011	To Spokane Braves Luke Richardson	To Creston Valley Thunder Cats Future considerations

== See also ==
- 2010 in ice hockey
- 2011 in ice hockey
- Kootenay International Junior Hockey League
