= Revelstoke Grizzlies =

Canadian junior ice hockey team

- City: Revelstoke, British Columbia
- League: Kootenay International Junior Hockey League
- Division: Interior
- Founded: 1993–94
- Home arena: Revelstoke Forum
- Colours
- Owner: Revelstoke Grizzlies Hockey Society
- General manager: Ryan Parent
- Head coach: Jiri Novak
- Website: revelstokegrizzlies.com

Franchise history
- 1993–2026: Revelstoke Grizzlies (KIJHL)
- 2026-present: Revelstoke Grizzlies (BCHC)

The Revelstoke Grizzlies are a Junior ice hockey team based in Revelstoke, British Columbia, Canada. They are set to compete in the Interior Division in the British Columbia Hockey Conference (BCHC) beginning in the 2026–27 season after playing in the Kootenay International Junior Hockey League (KIJHL). They play their home games at Revelstoke Forum.

== History ==
The Grizzlies were founded in 1993. They have won the KIJHL championship 5 times: in 1998, 2010, 2019, 2022, and 2024. The Grizzlies went on to win provincial championships in 2010, 2019, 2023 and 2024, and the Western Canada regional championship Keystone Cup in 2010.

On April 20, 2026, the Grizzlies were named as one of 22 teams joining the BCHC, leaving the KIJHL with the remaining 12 teams.

Statistics
Season	GP	W	L	T	OTL	Pts	GF	GA	Finish	Playoffs
1993–94	40	12	26	2	0	26	189	287	4th in division	Lost first round
1994–95	44	5	39	0	0	10	171	319	5th in division	Did not qualify
1995–96	42	21	21	0	0	42	240	224	3rd in division	Lost first round
1996–97	42	20	21	1	0	41	191	202	4th in division	Lost first round
1997–98	50	34	15	1	0	69	288	194	2nd in division	Won final against Osoyoos
1998–99	52	31	19	2	0	64	245	201	3rd in division	Lost final against Beaver Valley
1999–00	46	24	20	2	0	50	214	194	4th in division	Lost first round
2000–01	54	45	7	2	0	92	321	145	1st in division	Lost final against Beaver Valley (4:0)
2001–02	50	35	10	4	1	75	278	149	2nd in division	Lost quarterfinal against Sicamous (4:1)
2002–03	50	15	28	6	1	37	159	236	4th in division	Lost first round against Sicamous (4:0)
2003–04	50	19	27	1	3	42	184	230	4th in division	Lost first round against Kamloops (4:0)
2004–05	50	30	17	1	2	63	221	182	3rd in division	Lost quarterfinal against Kamloops (4:0)
2005–06	50	27	21	2	0	56	186	172	3rd in division	Lost first round against Kamloops (4:0)
2006–07	52	27	23	2	0	56	189	188	3rd in division	Lost quarterfinal against Kamloops (4:0)
2007–08	52	35	14	3	0	73	212	145	1st in division	Lost semifinal against Kamloops (4:3)
2008–09	52	20	30	2	0	42	141	170	5th in division	Lost in round robin (0-7-1)
2009–10	50	35	9	1	5	76	226	147	1st in division	Won final against Nelson (4:1); Won provincial final against Peninsula Panthers (4:1); Won regional final against Tri-Town Thunder (5:3)
2010–11	50	40	9	0	1	81	225	141	1st in division	Lost semifinal against Osoyoos (4:2)
2011–12	52	37	11	0	4	78	275	165	1st in division	Lost first round against Sicamous (4:3)
2012–13	52	27	21	3	1	58	190	181	1st in division	Lost first round against Sicamous (4:1)
2013–14	52	9	39	0	4	22	128	299	5th in division	Did not qualify
2014–15	52	24	21	2	5	55	166	168	5th in division	Did not qualify
2015–16	52	22	25	2	3	49	142	150	4th in division	Lost first round against 100 Mile (4:0)
2016–17	47	19	25	1	2	41	139	162	4th in division 14th overall	Lost first round against Chase (4:1)
2017–18	47	34	8	2	3	73	212	123	1st in division 2nd overall	Lost final against Kimberley (4:1)
2018–19	49	42	6	0	1	85	265	105	1st in division 3rd overall	Won final against Kimberley (4:1)
2019–20	49	39	6	1	3	82	224	108	1st in division 2nd overall	Won first round against Kamloops (4:0); Playoffs cancelled
2020–21	2	2	0	0	0	4	15	5	Season cancelled	
2021–22	42	31	9	0	2	64	145	84	1st in division 2nd overall	Won first round against Sicamous (4:0); Won quarterfinal against Storm (4:2); Won semifinal against Coyotes (4:0); Won final against Nelson (4:1)
2022–23	44	30	7	3	4	67	153	95	1st in division 2nd overall	Won first round against 100 Mile (4:0); Won quarterfinal against Sicamous (4:0); Lost semifinal against Princeton (4:2)
2023–24	44	34	8	0	2	70	193	83	1st in division 2nd overall	Won first round against Chase (4:0); Won quarterfinal against Kamloops (4:0); Won semifinal against Princeton (4:3); Won final against Fernie (4:0)
2024–25	44	32	7	1	4	69	173	109	2nd in division 3rd overall	Won first round against Merritt (4:1); Won quarterfinal against Princeton (4:2); Won semifinal against 100 Mile (4:1); Lost final against Grand Forks (4:0)

=== Playoffs ===
Records as of April 9, 2024.

Season	1st Round	2nd Round	3rd Round	Finals
1999–00	Playoff statistics not available			
2000–01	W, 4–0, Columbia Valley	W, 4–3, Sicamous	—	L, 0–4, Beaver Valley
2001–02	W, 4–0, Summerland	L, 1–4, Sicamous	—	—
2002–03	L, 0–4, Sicamous	—	—	—
2003–04	L, 0–4, Osoyoos	—	—	—
2004–05	W, 4–3, Sicamous	L, 0–4, Osoyoos	—	—
2005–06	L, 0–4, Osoyoos	—	—	—
2006–07	W, 4–2, Summerland	L, 0–4, Kamloops	—	—
2007–08	Bye	W, 4–3, Sicamous	L, 3–4, Kamloops	—
2008–09	L, 0-7-1, Round-robin	—	—	—
2009–10	Bye	W, 4-2 Chase	W, 4-0 Princeton	W, 4-1 Nelson
2010-11	W, 4–1, North Okanagan	W, 4–1, Kamloops	L, 2–4, Osoyoos	—
2011-12	L, 3–4, Sicamous	—	—	—
2012-13	L, 1–4, Sicamous	—	—	—
2013-14	Did not qualify			
2014-15	Did not qualify			
2015-16	L, 0–4, 100 Mile House	—	—	—
2017-18	W, 4–2, Kamloops	W, 4–3, 100 Mile House	W, 4–3, Osoyoos	L, 2-4 Kimberley
2018-19	W, 4–0, Kamloops	W, 4–0, 100 Mile House	W, 4–2, Kelowna	W, 4–1, Kimberley
2019-20	W, 4–0, Kamloops	2-0, 100 Mile House	Cancelled due to COVID-19	
2020-21	Playoffs cancelled due to the coronavirus pandemic			
2021-22	W, 4–0, Sicamous	W, 4–2, Kamloops	W, 4–0, Osoyoos	W, 4–1, Nelson
2022-23	W, 4-0, 100 Mile House	W, 4-0, Sicamous	L, 2-4, Princeton	—
2023-24	W, 4-0, Chase	W, 4-0, Kamloops	W, 4-3, Princeton	W, 4-0, Fernie
2024-25	W, 4-1, Merritt	W, 4-2, Princeton	W, 4-1, 100 Mile House	L, 0-4, Grand Forks

Notes

1. Prior to the 2001-02 KIJHL playoffs, there was three rounds only (Division Semifinals, Division Finals and Finals).

=== Cyclone Taylor Cup ===
British Columbia Jr. B Provincial Hockey Championships

Season	Round Robin	Record	Standing	Bronze Medal Game	Gold Medal Game
2010	L, Peninsula Panthers, 1-5; T, Aldergrove Kodials, 3-3; W, Oceanside Generals, 5-1	1-1-1	2nd of 4	n/a	W, Peninsula 4-1; Cyclone Taylor Cup Champions
2019	L, Victoria Cougars 1-4; W, North Van Wolfpack 5-1; W, Campell River Storm 3-2	2-1-0	2nd of 4	n/a	W, Victoria Cougars 5-1; Cyclone Taylor Cup Champions
2022	L, Langley Trappers, 1-3; L, Delta Ice Hawks, 0-2; W, Peninsula Panthers, 2-1 (SO)	0-2-1	3rd of 4	W, Delta 3-2; Bronze Medal	n/a
2023; HOST	L, Oceanside Generals, 1-5; W, Kimberley Dynamiters, 4-1; W, Delta Ice Hawks, 5-2 (SO)	2-1-0	1st of 4	n/a	W, Kimberley Dynamiters, 4-1; Cyclone Taylor Cup Champions

=== Keystone Cup ===
WESTERN CANADA, Jr. B National Championships

Records as of April 18, 2010.

Season	Bronze Medal Game	Gold Medal Game
2009–10	n/a	W, 5–3, Tri-Town

=== Mowat Cup ===
Established 2024 - KIJHL - PJHL - VIJHL prompted from Jr. B to Jr A

Season	Round Robin	Record	Standing	Bonze Medal Game	Gold Medal Game
2024	W, Ridge Meadows, 2-1; W, Kimberley Dynamiters, 3-1; W, Saanich, 7-4	4-0-0	1st of 4	n/a	W, Ridge Meadows, 3-2 (OT) Mowat Cup Champions

== Awards and trophies ==
Top Defenseman

- Caleb Roy: 2009-2010
- Caleb Roy (Overall Winner): 2009-2010
- Shawn Shackleton: 2007-2008

2014-15 Nii Noi Tetteh

Most Sportsmanlike

- Faiz Khan: 2009-2010
- Faiz Khan (Overall Winner): 2009-2010

Coach of the Year

- Troy Mick: 2009-2010
- Troy Mick (Overall Winner): 2009-2010
- Brad Fox: 2006-2007

Top Goaltender

- Andrew Parent: 2009-2010
- Jordan Barry: 2007-2008

2014-15 Aidan Doak

Rookie of the Year

- David Skagen: 2007-2008

2014-15 Steven Fiust

== Sources ==
- Cooper, Alex (14 February 2011). "Grizzlies ready for playoffs after winning final regular season games". Revelstoke Review. Black Press Media.
- Cooper, Alex (4 April 2012). "Mounting financial losses cited as reason for sale of Revelstoke Grizzlies". Revelstoke Review. Black Press Media.
- Cooper, Alex (13 June 2014). "Revelstoke Grizzlies purchased by new ownership group". Revelstoke Review. Black Press Media.
- Brouwer, Barb (16 September 2024). "Revelstoke Grizzlies ask council for earlier ice time". Revelstoke Review. Black Press Media.
- Lindquist, Evert (17 July 2025). "Revelstoke Grizzlies get late home opener, new defender for 2025-26". Revelstoke Review. Black Press Media.

Preceded by Richmond Sockeyes	Keystone Cup Champions; 2010	Succeeded by Blackfalds Wranglers
