= Kimberley Dynamiters =

Dynamiters or Kimberley Dynamiters may refer to:

The Kimberley Dynamiters may refer to:

- Kimberley Dynamiters (WKHL), an ice hockey team that played 1932–1942 in the West Kootenay League and the Alberta-British Columbia Senior League
- Kimberley Dynamiters (WIHL), an ice hockey team that played 1946–1981 in the Western International Hockey League
- Kimberley Dynamiters (KIJHL), the Canadian 'B' Junior ice hockey team that currently plays in the Kootenay International Junior Hockey League and used to play in the RMJHL and AWHL
