= Kamloops Storm =

Canadian junior ice hockey team

- City: Kamloops, British Columbia
- League: KIJHL (1996-2026); BCHC (2026-present)
- Division: Interior
- Founded: 1996–97
- Home arena: MacArthur Island Arena
- Colours: Blue, Red, Silver and Tan
- President: Matt Kolle
- General manager: Matt Kolle
- Head coach: Andrew Fisher
- Captain: Vacant
- Website: www.kamloopsstormhockey.com

Franchise history
- 1996–1997: Osoyoos Rebels
- 1997–2001: Osoyoos Heat
- 2001–2006: Osoyoos Storm
- 2006–2026: Kamloops Storm
- 2026–present: Kamloops Storm (BCHC)

The Kamloops Storm are a Junior 'A' ice hockey team based in Kamloops, British Columbia, Canada. They are set to compete in the Interior Division in the British Columbia Hockey Conference (BCHC) beginning in the 2026–27 season after playing in the Kootenay International Junior Hockey League (KIJHL). They play their home games at MacArthur Island Olympic Arena.

The Storm played in Osoyoos, British Columbia until 2006, when they were moved to Kamloops. The 2006–07 season was the first one played in Kamloops.

== History ==
The Storm won the 2004–05 KIJHL Championship, but were eliminated by the Sicamous Eagles in the 2005–06 playoffs.

The Storm also won the Keystone Cup in 2004–05.

In the 2006–07 season the Kamloops Storm went on to capture the regular season Division banner and also the playoff division banner before losing to the Fernie Ghostriders in the League Semi Finals.

The Kamloops Storm lost in the Finals to the Fernie Ghostriders 2–4 in the KIJHL 2007–08 season.

In the 2008–09 season the Kamloops Storm went to the KIJHL playoff finals, but lost to the Nelson Leafs 0–4.

The Kamloops Storm battled to the KIJHL playoff finals again for the 2013–14 season only to drop the series to the Beaver Valley Nitehawks 2–4.

On April 20, 2026, the Storm were named as one of 22 teams joining the BCHC, leaving the KIJHL with the remaining 12 teams.

== Season-by-season record ==
Note: GP = Games played, W = Wins, L = Losses, T = Ties, OTL = Overtime Losses, D = Defaults, Pts = Points, GF = Goals for, GA = Goals against

Records as of February 17, 2024.

Season	GP	W	L	D	OTL	Pts	GF	GA	Finish	Playoffs
2006–07	52	30	18	0	4	64	204	171	1st, Okanagan Shuswap	Lost in League Semifinals, 0–3 (Ghostriders)
2007–08	52	29	21	0	2	60	184	148	2nd, Eddie Mountain: West	Lost in Finals, 2–4 (Ghostriders)
2008–09	52	35	13	0	4	74	214	141	1st, Okanagan	Lost in Finals, 0–4 (Leafs)
2009–10	50	22	21	0	7	51	178	195	5th, Okanagan	Lost in Conference Quarterfinals, 1–3 (Chiefs)
2010–11	50	24	24	0	2	50	165	169	2nd, Doug Birks	Lost in Division Finals, 1–4 (Grizzlies)
2011–12	52	35	10	1	6	77	236	166	2nd, Doug Birks	Lost in Division Finals, 3–4 (Eagles)
2012–13	52	18	28	2	4	42	167	191	4th, Doug Birks	Lost in Division Semifinals, 1–4 (Knights)
2013–14	52	42	9	0	1	85	247	145	1st, Doug Birks	Lost in Finals, 2–4 (Nitehawks)
2014–15	52	33	17	0	2	68	195	135	1st, Doug Birks	Lost in Finals, 2–4 (Dynamiters)
2015–16	52	32	14	2	4	70	160	128	2nd, Doug Birks	Lost in Division Semifinals, 1–4 (Heat)
2016–17	47	23	17	1	6	53	153	137	3rd of 5 Doug Birks; 10th of 20 - KIJHL	Won Div Semifinals, 4–2 (100 Mile House); Lost Division Finals, 1–4 (Heat)
2017–18	47	18	24	3	2	41	146	171	4th of 5 Doug Birks; 13th of 20 - KIJHL	Lost in Div Semifinals, 2–4 (Grizzlies)
2018–19	49	19	27	1	2	41	122	186	4th of 5 Doug Birks; 15th of 20 - KIJHL	Lost Div Semifinals, 0-4 (Grizzlies)
2019–20	49	22	26	0	1	45	145	153	4th of 5 Doug Birks; 14th of 20 - KIJHL	Lost in Div Semifinals, 0–4 (Grizzlies)
2020–21	2	2	0	0	0	4	6	4	Remaining season cancelled due to COVID-19	
2021–22	42	28	10	0	4	60	141	91	2nd of 5 Doug Birks; 6th of 19 - KIJHL	Won Div Semifinals, 4-3 (Heat); Lost Division Finals, 2–4 (Grizzlies)
2022–23	44	26	13	-	5	57	145	105	2nd, Doug Birks	Lost Div Semifinals, 3-4 (Eagles)
2023–24	44	31	11	1	1	64	146	102	2nd of 5 Doug Birks; 6th of 19 - KIJHL	Won Div Semifinals, 4-3 (Eagles); Lost Div. Final, 0-4 (Grizzlies)
2024–25	44	25	18	1	0	51	155	141	2nd of 5 Doug Birks; 5th of 11 O/S Conf; 10th of 21 - KIJHL	Won Div Semifinals, 4-0 (River Rush); Lost Div. Final, 2-4 (Wranglers)

=== Playoffs ===
Records as of March 12, 2024.

Season	1st Round	2nd Round	3rd Round	Finals
2006–07	W, 4–1, Sicamous	W, 4–0, Revelstoke	L, 0–3, Fernie	—
2007–08	W, 3–1, Summerland	W, 4–0, Princeton	W, 4–3, Revelstoke	L, 2–4, Fernie
2008–09	W, 4–2–2, round-robin	W, 4–0, Princeton	W, 3–2, Sicamous	L, 0–4, Nelson
2009–10	L, 1–3, Chase	—	—	—
2010–11	W, 4–1, Sicamous	L, 1–4, Revelstoke	—	—
2011–12	W, 4–3, North Okanagan	L, 3–4, Sicamous	—	—
2012–13	L, 1–4, North Okanagan	—	—	—
2013–14	W, 4–1, Sicamous	W, 4–0, 100 Mile House	W, 4–1, Osoyoos	L, 2–4, Nitehawks
2014–15	W, 4–1, Sicamous	W, 4–1, 100 Mile House	W, 4–1, Osoyoos	L, 2–4, Kimberley
2015–16	L, 1–4, Chase	—	—	—
2016–17	W, 4–2, 100 Mile House	L, 1–4, Chase	—	—
2017–18	L, 2–4, Revelstoke	—	—	—
2018–19	L, 0-4, Revelstoke	—	—	—
2019–20	L, 0-4, Revelstoke	—	—	—
2020–21	Playoffs cancelled due to coronavirus pandemic			
2021–22	W, 4-3, Chase	L, 2-4, Revelstoke	—	—
2022–23	L, 3-4, Sicamous	—	—	—
2023-24	W, 4-3, Sicamous	L, 0-4, Revelstoke	—	—
2024-25	W, 4-0, Quesnel	L, 2-4, 100 Mile House	—	—

== NHL alumni ==
- Chuck Kobasew
- John Ludvig

== Awards and trophies ==
Most Valuable Player

- Anthony Manfredi: 2007–2008
- Anthony Manfredi: 2006–2007
- Jeff Taylor: 2005–2006
- Kyle Thompson: 2004–2005

Top Goaltender

- Anthony Manfredi: 2007–2008
- Anthony Manfredi: 2006–2007
- Ray Nunes: 2004–2005

Top Scorer

- Jassi Sangha: 2007–2008
- Jassi Sangha: 2006–2007
- Jeff Taylor: 2005–2006
- Kyle Thompson: 2004–2005

Top Rookie

- Keaton Gordon: 2014–2015

Most Sportsmanlike

- Lundy Trenaman: 2006–2007

Coach of the year

- Jim Liebel: 2004–2005

Kamloops Storm Team Picture 2013–2014

Kamloops Storm Team Picture 2014–2015

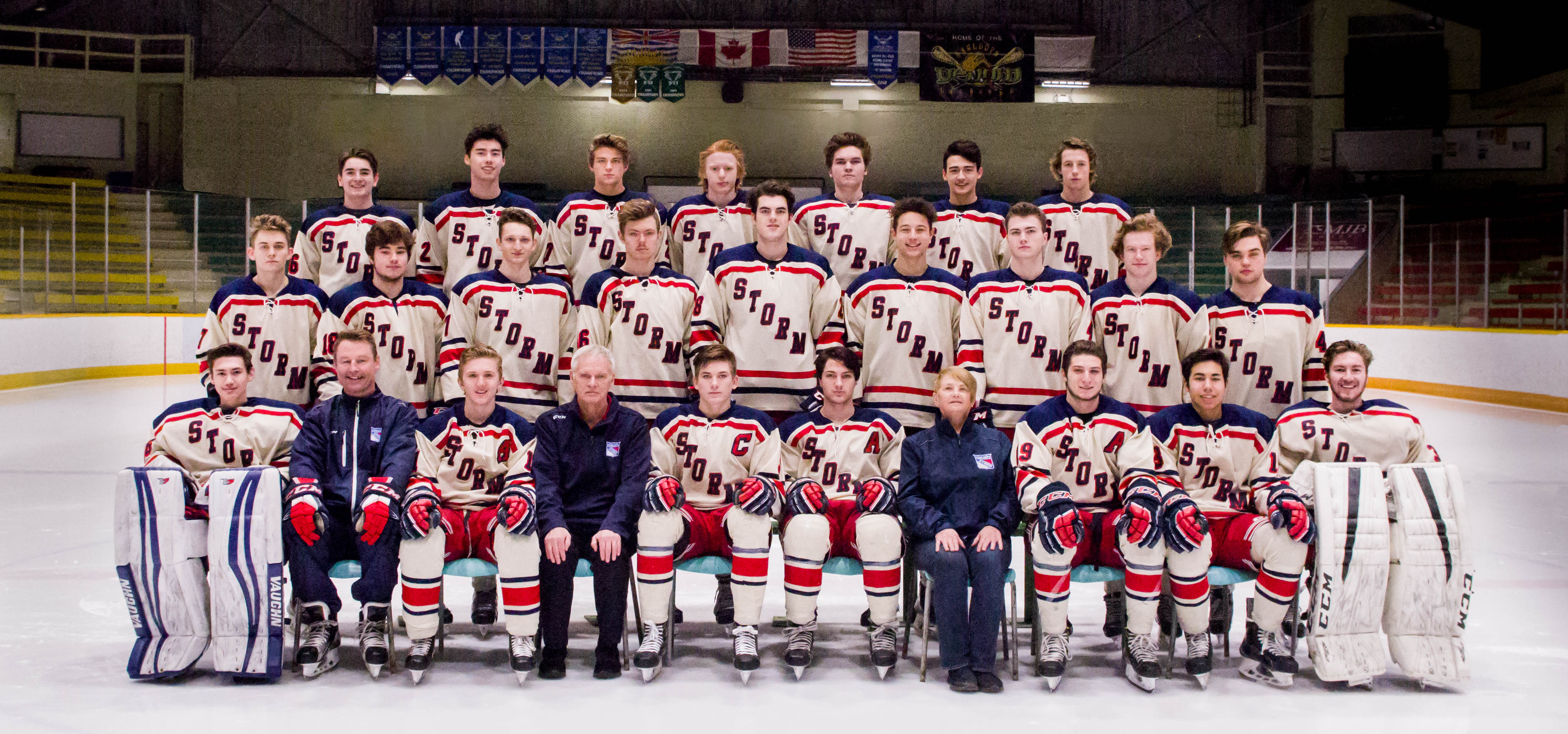
Kamloops Storm Team Picture 2017–2018
