= Beaver Valley Nitehawks =

Canadian junior ice hockey team

- City: Fruitvale, British Columbia
- League: KIJHL (1981-2026); BCHC (2026-present)
- Division: Kootenay
- Founded: 1981–82
- Home arena: Beaver Valley Arena
- Colours: Navy, Orange and White
- President: Steve Piccolo
- General manager: Terry Jones
- Head coach: Terry Jones
- Captain: William Ray
- Website: bvnitehawks.com

Franchise history
- 1981–2026: Beaver Valley Nitehawks (KIJHL)
- 2026-present: Beaver Valley Nitehawks (BCHC)

Championships
- Playoff championships: Keystone Cup: 2014; Cyclone Taylor Cup: 2017, 2014, 2001, 1997; KIJHL: 2017, 2014, 2012, 2004, 2003, 2001, 1999, 1997

The Beaver Valley Nitehawks are a Junior 'A' ice hockey team based in Fruitvale, British Columbia, Canada. They are set to compete in the Kootenay Division in the British Columbia Hockey Conference (BCHC) beginning in the 2026–27 season after playing in the Kootenay International Junior Hockey League (KIJHL).. They play their home games at Beaver Valley Arena. Steve Piccolo is the team's president, and Terry Jones has been the general manager and coach since 2015.

The Nitehawks joined the league in 1981 as an expansion team. In its KIJHL history, the team has won the Keystone Cup once in 2014; the Cyclone Taylor Cup four times, in 1997, 2001, 2014, and 2017; and have won the KIJHL Championship eight times, in 1997, 1999, 2001, 2003, 2004, 2012, 2014, and 2017. They won nine division playoff titles as a member of the Neil Murdoch Division from 1996 to 2014 and one conference playoff title as a member of the Kootenay Conference from 2007 to 2014.

The Nitehawks have retired five players' jerseys in their team history—Rocky Dickson (2), Barrett Jackman (6), Adam Deadmarsh (12), Sam Swanson (29) and Cody Franson (88).

== Team history ==
=== 1979-1981: KIJHL Application ===
The idea of starting a junior hockey team in Fruitvale was born when Shirley Levesque, manager of the Beaver Valley Midgets, and Darrell Dickson, their coach, hosted a Beaver Valley Minor Hockey Tournament. During this tournament they noticed people from the valley, who had never before been inside the 10-year-old building, coming to games at six in the morning to watch the young talent. This was a good indication that there were many local hockey fans just waiting for some exciting and entertaining hockey; Darrell suggested to Shirley that they start a junior team, and the work began.

They had to convince the Kootenay International Junior Hockey League that there were enough young hockey players in the area to warrant another junior team. This was not an easy task, as many KIJHL teams at the time were situated within a half-hour of Fruitvale, and a new team might cause them to lose players they had counted on—but it was also appealing: they knew that rivalries would begin, bringing new fans to their arenas. Since BVMH was one of the strongest minor hockey programs around at the time, it seemed fitting they should have their own junior team to go with it.

Once the KIJHL accepted, an executive was formed consisting of Darrell Dickson, Shirley Levesque, Roy Taylor, Noel Smith and Stuart McPhee. There was a contest to choose the name, and when Robbie Taylor of Fruitvale suggested Nitehawks the executive knew they had a winner. Kim Campbell of Trail designed the hawk for the jersey crest, the first coaches were Tom Gawryletz and Murry Price, Darrell Dickson was the manager, and the trainers were Barry Marshall and Leo Campeau.

=== 1981–82 ===
The 1981-82 KIJHL season saw the first Beaver Valley Nitehawks hit the ice, led by captain Tyler Bolduc. The first year was very successful: the team went into a wild playoff with the Trail Smoke Eaters, and additional bleachers had to be brought into the arena for these exciting games. The Nitehawks were up two games to none, but when Trail came back to win the series they set the tempo of rivalry for years to come.

=== 1982-present ===
Over the next three decades the Nitehawks won their division championship nine times, the KIJHL championship five times (in 1997, 1999, 2001, 2003, 2004 and 2012), and two provincial championships for the Cyclone Taylor Cup (in 1997 and 2001). When they won the Cup in 2001, their playoff win–loss record was a perfect 16-0.

Entering the 2013-14 KIJHL Playoffs, the Nitehawks have made nineteen consecutive playoff appearances since the 1995-96 season; winning six-out-of-nine KIJHL Championships and winning one-out-of-four Cyclone Taylor Cups in that span.

They set a record in junior hockey for the longest winning streak, which started in the 1997 season and ended in the 1998 season after 39 straight wins. Many players receive scholarships and continue on to play college hockey but, of course, the pride of Fruitvale and the Nitehawks is Adam Deadmarsh, who not only won the World Cup of Hockey with Team USA but also brought the coveted Stanley Cup home to the Beaver Valley Arena in 1996. Other players drafted by the NHL teams were Ed Cristofoli from the 1983 team, Neil Eisenhut from the 1985 team, and Barrett Jackman from the 1997 team.

On April 20, 2026, the Nitehawks were named as one of 22 teams joining the BCHC, leaving the KIJHL with the remaining 12 teams.

== Season-by-season record ==
Note: GP = Games played, W = Wins, L = Losses, T = Ties, D = Defaults, OTL = Overtime Losses, Pts = Points, GF = Goals for, GA = Goals against

Final records as of February 17, 2024.

Season	GP	W	L	T	D	OTL	Pts	GF	GA	Finish	Playoffs
1981-82	42	19	23	0	―	―	38	211	270	4th, West	Lost to Trail
1982-83	42	21	20	1	―	―	43	235	232	2nd, West	
1983-84	40	25	14	1	―	―	51	237	219	2nd, West	
1984-85	40	13	27	0	―	―	26	204	255	6th, West	
1985-86	40	12	28	0	―	―	24	201	288	5th, West	
1986-87	42	4	38	0	―	―	8	157	383	4th, West	
1987-88	42	15	27	0	―	―	30	205	230	4th, West	
1988-89	45	24	21	0	―	―	48	205	223	3rd, West	
1989-90	40	16	24	0	―	―	32	169	220	6th, West	
1990-91	40	24	16	0	―	―	48	209	163	3rd, West	
1991-92	38	21	14	3	―	―	45	200	191	2nd, West	
1992-93	42	16	26	0	―	―	32	226	306	5th, West	
1993-94	40	18	21	1	―	―	37	206	262	3rd, West	Lost to Nelson
1994-95	44	14	28	―	―	2	32	172	203	5th, West	
1995-96	42	14	27	1	―	―	29	159	228	4th, West	Lost to Castlegar
1996-97	41	26	11	4	―	―	54	193	147	1st, Neil Murdoch	KIJHL Champions (Rockies); Cyclone Taylor Cup Champions
1997-98	50	29	18	3	―	―	61	228	204	1st, Neil Murdoch	
1998-99	50	37	11	2	―	―	76	219	139	1st, Neil Murdoch	KIJHL Champions (Grizzlies)
1999-00	46	30	13	3	―	―	63	287	174	2nd, Neil Murdoch	Lost in Division Finals (Leafs)
2000-01	58	45	7	3	―	3	96	338	180	1st, Neil Murdoch	KIJHL Champions, 4-0 (Grizzlies); Cyclone Taylor Cup Champions (Storm)
2001-02	50	37	9	3	―	1	78	266	138	1st, Neil Murdoch	Lost in Finals, 1-3 (Eagles)
2002-03	50	42	7	1	―	0	85	269	118	1st, Neil Murdoch	KIJHL Champions, 3-0 (Eagles)
2003-04	50	39	9	2	―	0	80	239	133	1st, Neil Murdoch	KIJHL Champions, 1-0 (Storm)
2004-05	50	35	10	3	―	2	75	255	143	1st, Neil Murdoch	Lost in Finals, 1-4 (Storm)
2005-06	50	35	10	3	―	2	75	263	159	1st, Neil Murdoch	Lost in Finals, 1-4 (Eagles)
2006-07	52	35	14	―	―	3	73	229	162	2nd, Neil Murdoch	Lost in Division Finals, 2-4 (Leafs)
2007-08	52	32	12	―	―	8	72	211	175	2nd, Neil Murdoch: West	Lost in Conference Finals, 2-4 (Ghostriders)
2008-09	52	26	16	―	―	6	58	182	170	3rd, Neil Murdoch	Lost in Division Semifinals, 2-4 (Rebels)
2009-10	50	23	22	1	―	4	51	202	203	4th, Neil Murdoch	Lost in Division Semifinals, 3–4 (Leafs)
2010-11	50	32	13	1	―	4	69	202	170	2nd, Neil Murdoch	Lost in Division Finals, 1-4 (Rebels)
2011-12	52	42	7	0	―	3	87	323	154	1st, Neil Murdoch	KIJHL Champions, 4-0 (Chiefs)
2012-13	52	33	15	3	―	1	70	228	160	2nd, Neil Murdoch	Lost in Division Finals, 3-4 (Rebels)
2013-14	52	38	10	1	―	3	80	229	143	2nd, Neil Murdoch	KIJHL Champions, 4-2 (Storm); Cyclone Taylor Cup Champions (Kodiaks); Keystone Cup Champions (Pilots)
2014-15	52	35	12	1	0	4	75	208	152	1st, Neil Murdoch	Lost in Conference Finals, 1-4 (Dynamiters)
2015-16	52	34	11	4	0	3	75	224	150	1st, Neil Murdoch	Lost in Conference Finals, 1-4 (Dynamiters)
2016-17	47	38	5	1	0	3	80	218	105	1st, Neil Murdoch	KIJHL Champions, 3-0 (Heat); Cyclone Taylor Cup Champions (6-2) (Storm)
2017-18	47	27	15	2	0	3	59	170	127	3rd, Neil Murdoch	Lost in Div Semifinal 3-4 (Rebels)
2018-19	49	27	17	3	0	2	59	187	153	3rd of 5, Neil Murdoch; 6th of 20 KIJHL	Lost Div Final 1-4 (Dynamiters)
2019–20	49	22	19	2	0	6	52	165	155	3 of 5, Eddie Mountain; 10 of 20 KIJHL	Won Div Semifinals, 4-0, (Ghostriders); Incomplete Div Final 0-2 (Nelson); Playoffs cancelled due to covid-19
2020–21	Inactive this season										
2021–22	42	22	17	0	0	3	47	155	144	2nd of 5, Eddie Mountain; 10th of 19 KIJHL	Won Div Semifinals, 4-3, (Thunder Cats); Lost Div Final 2-4 (Leafs)
2022–23	44	24	17	1	2	0	51	129	136	3rd of 4, Neil Murdoch; 12th of 19 KIJHL	Won Div Semifinals, 4-2, (Leafs); Won Div Final 4-3 (Thunder Cats); Lost Conf Finals, 0-4 (Dynamiters)
2023–24	44	32	9	0	3	0	67	206	111	1st of 5, Neil Murdoch; 3rd of 20 KIJHL	Won Div Semifinals, 4-0, (Rebels); Won Div Final 4-2 (Border Bruins); Lost Conf Finals 2-4 (Ghostriders)
2024–25	44	30	11	3	0	0	63	176	115	2nd of 5, Neil Murdoch; 3rd of 10 Kootenay Conf; 5th of 21 KIJHL	Won Div Semifinals, 4-0, (Leafs); Lost Div Final 0-4 (Border Bruins)

=== Playoffs ===
Records as of March 30, 2024.

Season	1st Round	2nd Round	3rd Round	Finals
1999–00	W, 4-3, Osoyoos	L, Nelson	—	—
2000–01	W, 4-0, Nelson	W, 4-0, Osoyoos	—	W, 4-0, Revelstoke
2001–02	W, 4-0, Spokane	W, 4-1, Castlegar	W, 3-0, Columbia Valley	L, 1-3, Sicamous
2002–03	W, 4-1, Castlegar	W, 4-3, Nelson	W, 3-0, Kimberley	W, 3-0, Sicamous
2003–04	W, 4-0, Castlegar	W, 4-0, Spokane	W, 2-1, Round-robin	W, 1-0, Osoyoos
2004–05	W, 4-0, Nelson	W, 4-1, Castlegar	W, 3-0, Kimberley	L, 1-4, Osoyoos
2005–06	W, 4-0, Spokane	W, 4-0, Nelson	W, 3-0, Fernie	L, 1-4, Sicamous
2006–07	W, 4-3, Castlegar	L, 2-4, Nelson	—	—
2007–08	W, 3-0, Castlegar	W, 4-3, Nelson	L, 2-4, Fernie	—
2008–09	L, 2-4, Castlegar	—	—	―
2009–10	L, 3-4, Nelson	―	―	―
2010-11	W, 4-3, Nelson	L, 1-4, Castlegar	—	—
2011-12	W, 4-1, Spokane	W, 4-3, Castlegar	W, 4-1, Fernie	W, 4-0, Kelowna
2012-13	W, 4-2, Nelson	L, 3-4 Castlegar	—	—
2013–14	W, 4-0 Castlegar	W, 4-2, Nelson	W, 4-1, Creston Valley	W 4-2, Kamloops
2014-15	W, 4-1, Nelson	W, 4-0, Castlegar	L, 1-4, Kimberley	—
2015–16	W, 4-0, Nelson	W, 4-1, Grand Forks	L, 1-4, Kimberley	―
2016–17	W, 4-0, Grand Forks	W, 4-0, Nelson	W, 3-2, Kimberley	W, 3-0, Chase
2017-18	L, 3-4, Castlegar	—	—	—
2018-19	W, 4-0, Grand Forks	W, 4-2, Nelson	L, 1-4, Kimberley	—
2019-20	W, 4-0, Castlegar	Playoffs cancelled due to coronavirus pandemic		
2020-21	Playoffs cancelled due to coronavirus pandemic			
2021-22	W, 4-3, Creston Valley	L, 2-4, Nelson	—	—
2022-23	W, 4-2, Nelson	W, 4-3, Creston Valley	L, 0-4, Kimberley	—
2023-24	W, 4-0, Castlegar	W, 4-2, Grand Forks	L, 2-4, Fernie	—
2024-25	W, 4-0, Nelson	L, 0-4, Grand Forks	—	—

=== Cyclone Taylor Cup ===
Year	Finals	Semifinals
2001	W, Campbell River	W, 2-0, Delta
2003	—	L, 0-2, Campbell River

Season	Round Robin	Record	Standing	Bronze Medal Game	Gold Medal Game
2004	-, - , 0-0 -, - , 0-0 -, - , 0-0	?-?-?	unknown of 4	L, Peninsula4-7	n/a
2012	-, - , 0-0 -, - , 0-0 -, - , 0-0	?-?-?	unknown of 4	L, Delta 3-5	n/a
2014	L, Aldergrove 1-4; T, Nelson 2-2; W, Victoria 3-0	1-1-1	2nd of 4	n/a	W, Aldergrove 5-2; Cyclone Taylor Cup Champions
2017; HOST	W, Campbell River 6-0; L, Aldergrove 3-5; W, Creston Valley 6-2	2-1-0	1st of 4	n/a	W, Campbell River 6-2; Cyclone Taylor Cup Champions

== Keystone Cup history ==
Western Canadian Jr. B Championships (Northern Ontario to British Columbia)
Six teams in round robin play. 1st vs 2nd for gold/silver; 3rd vs 4th for bronze.

Year	Round Robin	Record	Standing	Bronze Medal Game	Gold Medal Game
2001	L, Ridge Meadows 3-7; T, Assiniboia 1-1; W, Edmonton 5-3; W, St. Malo 10-4; W, Westfort 7-0	3-1-1	3rd of 6	W, Edmonton 5-3; Bronze Medalist	tbd
2014	W, Abbotsford 10-2; W, Saskatoon 5-1; W, Blackfalds 5-1; W, Selkirk 3-0; W, Thunder Bay 4-0	5-0-0	1st of 6	n/a	W, Abbotsford 5-1; Keystone Champions
2017	T, Wainwright 3-3; W, Arborg 9-1; W, Nipigon 10-2; W, Regina 6-1; W, Peguis 8-2	4-0-1	1st of 6	n/a	OT LOst, 3-4 Wainwright; Silver Medalist

== NHL alumni ==
- Craig Cunningham
- Adam Deadmarsh
- Neil Eisenhut
- Cody Franson
- Barret Jackman
- Connor Jones
- Kevin Koopman
- Steve McCarthy

== Awards and trophies ==
Cyclone Taylor Cup (4)

- 1997, 2001, 2014, 2017

Keystone Cup (1)

- 2014

KIJHL Championship (8)

- 1996-97, 1998–99, 2000–01, 2002–03, 2003–04, 2011–12, 2013–14,
  2016-17

Coach of the Year

- Terry Jones: 2002-03, 2004–05, 2005-06 (Divisional)
- Terry Jones: 2011-12 (Divisional and League)

Most Sportsmanlike

- Tyler Waycott: 2003-04 (Divisional)
- Kyle St. Denis: 2005-06 (Divisional)
- Ryon Sookro: 2010-11 (Divisional and League)
- Chris DerochieL 2011-12 (Divisional)
- Ryan Edwards 2013-14 (Divisional and League)
- Michael Pruss: 2014-2015 (Divisional)

Most Valuable Player

- Jake Morissette: 2001-02 (Divisional)
- Kevin Koopman: 2005-06 (Divisional)
- Craig Martin: 2011-12 (Divisional)
- Dallas Calvin: 2012-13 (Divisional)
- Mitch Foyle: 2014-2015 (Divisional)

Rookie of the Year

- Conner Jones: 2006-07 (Divisional)
- Kellen Jones: 2006-07 (Divisional)
- Steve Koshey: 2007-08 (Divisional)
- Dallas Calvin: 2010-11(Divisional)
- Craig Martin: 2011-12 (Divisional)
- Connor Brown-Maloski: 2012-13 (Divisional)
- Ross Armour: 2014-2015 (Divisional)

Top Goaltender

- Louis Menard: 2002-03 (Divisional)
- Ryan Riddle: 2003-04 (Divisional)
- Michael Persson: 2004-05 (Divisional)
- Justin Mulholland: 2005-06 (Divisional)
- Patrick Sullivan: 2006-2007 (Divisional)
- Hunter Young: 2019-20 (Divisional and Leaque)

Top Scorer

- Jake Morissette: 2001-02 (Divisional)
- Scott Morisseau: 2009-10 (Divisional and League)
- Chris Derochie: 2011-12 (Divisional)

More about their team records can be found on their website.

Preceded by Richmond Sockeyes	Keystone Cup Champions; 2014	Succeeded by Campbell River Storm
