= Fernie Ghostriders =

Canadian junior ice hockey team

- City: Fernie, British Columbia
- League: KIJHL (2004-2026); BCHC (2026-present)
- Division: Kootenay
- Founded: 1991 (RMJHL)
- Home arena: Fernie Memorial Arena
- Colours: Black, Red, Silver and White
- President: Mike Casault
- General manager: Chad Scharff
- Head coach: Chad Scharff
- Asst. coach: Ben Sherven
- Captain: Liam Breakenridge
- Website: fernieghostriders.com

Franchise history
- 1991–1999: Fernie Ghostriders (RMJHL)
- 1999–2003: Fernie Ghostriders (AWHL)
- 2003–2004: Fernie Ghostriders (NAHL)
- 2004–2026: Fernie Ghostriders (KIJHL)
- 2026–present: Fernie Ghostriders (BCHC)

The Fernie Ghostriders are a Junior 'A' ice hockey team based in Fernie, British Columbia, Canada. They are set to compete in the Kootenay Division in the British Columbia Hockey Conference (BCHC) beginning in the 2026–27 season after playing in the Kootenay International Junior Hockey League (KIJHL). They play their home games at the Fernie Memorial Arena in Fernie, British Columbia. Mike Casault is the team's president. Chad Scharff is the head coach and general manager.

The Ghostriders joined the KIJHL in 2004 as an expansion team, after they played Junior 'A' in the RMJHL from 1991 to 1999; the AWHL from 1999 to 2003; and the NAHL in 2003–04. In its RMJHL history, the team has won one division playoff title as a member of the Kootenay Division from 1991–1996. In its AWHL history, the Ghostriders have won the Bourne Cup once, in 1999. In its KIJHL history, the team has won the KIJHL Championship twice, in 2007 and 2008. They won two division playoff titles as a member of the Eddie Mountain Division from 2004–2007, one playoff title as a member of the Eastern Division of the Neil Murdoch Conference from 2007–2008 and four consecutive playoff titles as a member of the Eddie Mountain Division from 2008–2012; one conference playoff title as a member of the Kootenay Conference from 2007–2012.

The Ghostriders takes its name from the Ghost Rider, an iconic shadow that appears on Mount Hosmer and is visible from the city. Mount Hosmer appears on the team's current and past logo.

== Team history ==
Ghostriders Alternate Logo

Ghostriders win the 2007 KIJHL Championship

2007 KIJHL Championship Photo

=== 1991–1999: RMJHL ===
The Ghostriders began in 1991 as one of the charter members of the Southern Division of the now defunct Rocky Mountain Junior Hockey League (RMJHL). The Ghostriders missed the 1993 season but came back with a vengeance, capturing the Southern Division in 1994. In 1996, after not qualifying to make the playoffs the year prior, the Ghostriders dramatically improved, making it to the Finals before losing to the history-rich Prince George Spruce Kings, four games to one. The following year, looking for vengeance after losing the RMJHL Championship the year before, the Ghostriders once again made it to the Finals, this time being swept 4–0 to the regular season lead-leading Cranbrook Colts. In 1998, after making it to the Finals two years in a row they got beat 4–1 in the semifinals by the Colts. The next year the Ghostriders made it to the last RMJHL Finals, losing to the league-leading Kimberley Dynamiters 4–2.

=== 1999–2003: AWHL ===
When the RMJHL folded in 1999 the Ghostriders moved to the America West Hockey League (AWHL), winning the championship in 2000, and made an appearance in the Gold Cup National Championship. The Ghostriders were US Junior National Gold Cup bronze medal winners in 2002.

=== 2003–2004: NAHL ===
They played in the North American Hockey League (NAHL) for one season before their move down, but their franchise rights were sold to a Kalamazoo, Michigan based group.

=== 2004–2008: KIJHL – Immediate success ===
In 2004 the Ghostriders moved down to the Kootenay International Junior Hockey League (KIJHL), opting to be a large fish in the Junior 'B' pond rather than a small fish in the Junior 'A' pond. The Ghostriders immediately made a mark on the KIJHL, finishing third overall in 2006 and winning their division. The Ghostriders won the 2007 championship in come-from-behind fashion on home ice against the Nelson Leafs, but did not fare as well in the 2007 Cyclone Taylor Cup, losing all of their games. The following year they won the championship again, this time on the road in Kamloops against the Kamloops Storm and also winning bronze in the 2008 Cyclone Taylor Cup against the Victoria Cougars, the 2008 Vancouver Island Junior Hockey League (VIJHL) Brent Patterson Memorial Trophy Champions.

=== 2008–2014: Success continues ===
In 2009 with the Ghostriders looking for a three-peat, the Fernie-based squad made it to the semifinals of the KIJHL, only to lose to the Nelson Leafs in the best of five series. The next year they made it all the way to the Kootenay Conference Final, but only to lose to the Nelson Leafs 4–1 in the best of seven series. In 2011 the Ghostriders once again made it to the Conference Final, but they lost 4–2 against the Castlegar Rebels. Looking for redemption after the Ghostriders lost to the Rebels in the third round of the playoffs, they hosted the 2011 Cyclone Taylor Cup, the BC junior 'B' provincial championships making it to the gold medal game, in front of a sold-out crowd at the Fernie Memorial Arena, only to lose to the VIJHL Brent Patterson Memorial Trophy Champions, the Peninsula Panthers, the same score the Ghostriders beat the Victoria Cougars for bronze in the 2008 Cyclone Taylor Cup, 5–3. The following year after winning the division playoff title and advancing to the third round of the playoffs for the seventh consecutive year, the Ghostriders lost in the Conference Final once again, this time losing to the regular season lead-leading and 2012 KIJHL Champions, the Beaver Valley Nitehawks, 4–1. In 2013, the Golden Rockets ended the Ghostriders' streak of seven consecutive playoff division titles, where they prevailed over the Ghostriders, 4–2, in the Division Finals.

=== 2014–present ===
After a disappointing early exit from the 2013–14 playoffs, the Ghostriders brought Craig Mohr back to Fernie as head coach and general manager, the club's coach for the 2004–05 and 2005–06 seasons. The Ghostriders finished the 2014–15 regular season at the top of the Eddie Mountain division and second overall in the league, before defeating the Golden Rockets in the first round of playoffs. The division finals saw the Ghostriders pitched against the Kimberley Dynamiters, where an exciting series culminated in Kimberley taking the division playoff title in six games. The Dynamiters progressed to eventually win the 2014–15 KIJHL Championship and placed second in the Cyclone Taylor Cup. The 2015–16 Ghostriders roster featured a younger side than in past years, with a strong local contingent and Cole Keebler as captain. After battling a plague of injuries throughout the regular season, the Ghostriders faced the defending league champion Dynamiters in the first round of playoffs and were defeated in five games. 2016–17 was another strong season for the club winning 26 games good enough for 2nd place in the Division, but the team would fall to the Dynamiters in 6 games in the first round.

2017–18 was a struggling year for the team both on and off the ice. The team was only able to win 15 games, their worst record since their arrival to the KIJHL. The club would part ways with Craig Mohr following this season and hire Jeff Wagner the team's new Head Coach/GM. 2018–19 saw the team return to form, finishing second in the Division and fifth in the League. This was followed up by a second in Division and third in League finish in 2019–20.

On April 20, 2026, the Ghostriders were named as one of 22 teams joining the British Columbia Hockey Conference, leaving the KIJHL with the remaining 12 teams.

=== Fernie Memorial Arena disaster ===
On Tuesday, October 17, 2017, an ammonia leak at the Fernie Memorial Arena killed three workers (two City of Fernie employees and one CIMCO refrigeration employee from Calgary) during the Ghostriders' regular season. The City of Fernie declared a state of emergency and evacuated the area for days. The team was relocated to the Elk Valley Leisure Centre in Sparwood, British Columbia, for the remainder of the 2017–18 KIJHL season. The City of Fernie decided to replace ammonia for a synthetic refrigerant prior to the 2018–19 season, allowing the Fernie Memorial Arena to reopen.

== Season-by-season record ==
Note: GP = Games played, W = Wins, L = Losses, T = Ties, OTL = Overtime Losses, Pts = Points, GF = Goals for, GA = Goals against

Records as of February 17, 2024.

Season	GP	W	L	T	OTL	Pts	GF	GA	Finish	Playoffs
1991-92	52	26	24	2	—	54	267	294	3rd, Kootenay	Lost in Division Semifinals, 0-4 (Colts)
1992-93	did not participate									
1993-94	52	19	32	—	1	39	212	158	4th, Kootenay	Lost in Division Semifinals, 0-4 (Dynamiters)
1994-95	52	15	37	—	0	30	199	352	6th, Kootenay	did not qualify
1995-96	58	32	24	—	2	66	282	260	3rd, Kootenay	Lost in Finals, 1-4 (Spruce Kings)
1996-97	60	31	26	—	3	65	267	252	3rd, RMJHL	Lost in Finals, 0-4 (Colts)
1997-98	54	25	27	—	2	52	219	303	3rd, RMJHL	Lost in Semifinals, 1-4 (Colts)
1998-99	45	27	18	—	0	54	164	165	2nd, RMJHL	Lost in Finals, 2-4 (Dynamiters)
1999-00	58	48	8	—	2	98	273	139	1st, AWHL	Bourne Cup Champions
2000-01	60	31	25	—	4	66	210	210	6th, AWHL	Lost in Conference Quarterfinals (Bulls)
2001-02	56	37	16	—	3	77	256	189	3rd, AWHL	Lost in Finals (Icedogs) bronze medal at gold cup championship
2002-03	56	23	29	—	4	50	191	220	5th, North	
2003–04	56	12	38	—	6	30	146	270	7th, West	did not qualify
2004-05	50	17	28	1	4	39	167	220	4th, Eddie Mountain	Lost in Division Semifinals, 2-4 (Dynamiters)
2005-06	50	35	9	3	3	76	223	137	1st, Eddie Mountain	Lost in League Semifinals, 0-3 (Nitehawks)
2006-07	52	38	10	—	4	80	254	245	1st, Eddie Mountain	KIJHL Champions, 4-2 (Leafs)
2007-08	52	32	17	—	3	67	184	145	1st, Neil Murdoch	KIJHL Champions, 4-2 (Storm)
2008-09	52	30	15	—	7	67	172	153	2nd, Eddie Mountain	Lost in League Semifinals, 0-3 (Leafs)
2009-10	50	41	7	1	1	84	243	103	1st, Eddie Mountain	Lost in Conference Finals, 1–4 (Leafs)
2010-11	50	42	5	0	3	87	265	118	1st, Eddie Mountain	Lost in Conference Finals, 2-4 (Rebels)
2011-12	52	35	12	0	5	75	237	148	1st, Eddie Mountain	Lost in Conference Finals, 1-4 (Nitehawks)
2012-13	52	35	13	1	3	74	195	152	1st, Eddie Mountain	Lost in Division Finals, 2-4 (Rockets)
2013-14	52	24	22	0	6	54	173	175	3rd, Eddie Mountain	Lost in Division Semifinals, 1-4 (Dynamiters)
2014-15	52	37	11	1	3	78	234	151	1st, Eddie Mountain	Lost division finals, 2-4 (Dynamiters)
2015-16	52	27	20	0	5	59	169	148	4th, Eddie Mountain	Lost Division Semifinals, 1-4 (Dynamiters)
2016-17	47	26	18	1	2	55	185	151	3rd, Eddie Mountain	Lost Division Semifinals, 2-4 (Dynamiters)
2017-18	47	15	28	1	3	34	153	214	4th, Eddie Mountain	Lost Division Semifinals, 1-4 (Dynamiters)
2018-19	49	26	18	4	4	60	168	134	2nd of 5, Eddie Mountain; 5th of 20 KIJHL	Won Division Semifinals, 4-0 (Rockies); Lost Division Semifinal 0-4 (Dynamiters)
2019–20	49	33	11	3	2	81	216	146	2nd of 5, Eddie Mountain; 3rd of 20 KIJHL	Lost div semi-finals, 0-4, (Rockies)
2020–21	3	2	1	0	0	10	13	4	Remaining season cancelled due to COVID-19	
2021–22	42	22	15	0	5	49	123	123	3rd of 4, Eddie Mountain; 8th of 19 KIJHL	Lost div semi-finals, 2-4, (Rockies)
2022–23	44	23	14	5	2	53	163	138	4th of 5, Eddie Mountain; 11th of 19 KIJHL	Won Div Semifinals, 4-2, (Rockies); Lost Div, 3-4 (Dynamiters)
2023–24	44	29	11	3	1	62	163	121	1st, Eddie Mountain; 6th of 20 KIJHL	Won div semi-finals, 4-1, (Thunder Cats); Won Div Finals, 4-2 (Rockies); Won Conf Finals 4-2 (Nitehawks); Lost League Finals 0-4 (Grizzlies)
2024–25	44	28	10	4	2	62	172	130	2nd of 5, Eddie Mountain; 4th of 10 Kootenay Conf; 6th of 21 KIJHL	Lost Div Semifinals, 0-4, (Rockies)
2025-26	44	24	15	3	2	53	133	118	2nd of 5, Eddie Mountain Div. 4th of 10 Kootenay Conf. 10th of 21 KIJHL	Div. Semifinals vs. Kimberley

=== Playoffs ===
Records as of April 9, 2024.

Season	1st round	2nd round	3rd round	Finals
1991–92	L, 0-4, Cranbrook	—	—	—
1992–93	Did not participate			
1993–94	L, 0-4, Kimberley	—	—	—
1994–95	Did not qualify			
1995–96	W, 4-0, Nelson	W, 4-0, Kimberley	—	L, 1-4, Prince George
1996–97	W, 4-2, Castlegar	W, 4-0, Kimberley	—	L, 0-4, Cranbrook
1997–98	Bye	L, 1-4, Cranbrook	—	—
1998–99	W, 4-3, Nelson	—	—	L, 2-4, Kimberley
1999–03	Playoff statistics not available			
2003–04	Did not qualify			
2004–05	L, 2-4, Kimberley	—	—	—
2005–06	W, 4-3, Golden	W, 4-3, Kimberley	L, 0-3, Beaver Valley	—
2006–07	W, 4-0, Columbia Valley	W, 4-0, Creston Valley	W, 3-0, Kamloops	W, 4-2, Nelson
2007–08	Bye	W, 4-3, Kimberley	W, 4-2, Beaver Valley	W, 4-2, Kamloops
2008–09	W, 4-1, Golden	W, 4-1, Kimberley	L, 0-3, Nelson	—
2009–10	W, 4-0, Golden	W, 4-0, Creston Valley	L, 1-4, Nelson	—
2010-11	W, 4-0, Kimberley	W, 4-3, Creston Valley	L, 2-4, Castlegar	—
2011-12	W, 4-0, Golden	W, 4-3, Kimberley	L, 1-4, Beaver Valley	—
2012-13	W, 4-2, Columbia Valley	L, 2-4, Golden	—	—
2013-14	L, 1-4, Kimberley	—	—	—
2014-15	W, 4-1, Golden	L, 2-4, Kimberley	—	—
2015-16	L, 1-4, Kimberley	—	—	—
2016-17	L, 2-4, Kimberley	—	—	—
2017-18	L, 1-4, Kimberley	—	—	—
2018-19	W, 4-0, Columbia Valley	L, 0-4, Kimberley	—	—
2019-20	L, 4-0, Columbia Valley	—	—	—
2020-21	Playoffs cancelled due to coronavirus pandemic			
2021-22	L, 4-2 Columbia Valley	—	—	—
2022-23	W, 4-2 Columbia Valley	L, 4-3 Kimberley	—	—
2023-24	W, 4-1, Creston Valley	W, 4-2, Columbia Valley	W, 4-2, Beaver Valley	L, 0-4, Revelstoke
2024-25	L, 0-4, Columbia Valley	—	—	—

Notes

1. The RMJHL playoffs had three playoff rounds.
2. The final 1998-99 RMJHL playoffs had two playoff rounds.

=== Cyclone Taylor Cup ===
Records as of March 3, 2017.

Season	Gold Medal Game	Bronze Medal Game
2006-07	Statistics not available	
2007-08	—	W, 5-3, Victoria
2010–11	L, 3-5, Peninsula	—

Notes

1. The Ghostriders hosted the 2011 Cyclone Taylor Cup, in Fernie, British Columbia, at the Fernie Memorial Arena.

== Alumni ==
- Frank Banham
- Lloyd Cook
- Josh Teves
- Wade Dubielewicz
- Ron Huston
- Jace Coyle
- David LeNeveu
- Dan Smith
- Scott Ford

== Captains ==
- Liam Breakenridge: 2026-27
- Ben Skarsen: 2025-26
- Taylor Haggerty: 2023-24; 2024-25
- Scott Sinclair: 2022-23
- Kyle Klein: 2021-22
- Sawan Gill: 2020-21
- Dylan Defosse: 2019-20
- Keelan Saworski: 2018-19
- Mitch Titus: 2017-18
- Alex Cheveldave: 2016-17
- Cole Keebler: 2015-16
- Dylan Robertson: 2014-15
- Ben Primeau: 2013-14
- Josh McKissock: 2012-13
- Ty Morton: 2011-12
- Thomas Abenante/Jeff Zmurchyk: 2010-11
- Tim Crawley: 2009-10
- Scotty Traverse: 2007-08; 2008–09
- Kiel Klapp: 2005-06; 2006–07
- Dean Smith: 2004-05

== Awards and trophies ==
Bourne Cup

- 1999-00

Gold Cup championship

- 2002 Bronze medal winners

KIJHL Championship

- 2006-07
- 2007-08

Coach of the Year

- Craig Mohr: 2004-05 (Divisional)
- William Verner: 2007-08 (Divisional)
- William Verner: 2009-10 (Divisional)
- Craig Mohr: 2014-15 (Divisional)
- Jeff Wagner: 2018-19 (Divisional)

Most Sportsmanlike

- Martin Crouteau: 2004-05 (Divisional)

Most Valuable Player

- Martin Croteau: 2006-07 (Divisional)
- Dave McIvor: 2008-09 (Divisional)
- Jason Greenwell: 2009-10 (Divisional)
- Scott Morisseau: 2010-11 (Divisional and League)

Rookie of the Year

- Trevor Hertz: 2006-07 (Divisional)
- Brendan Hawryluk: 2009-10 (Divisional)

Top Defenceman

- Scott Anderson: 2009-10 (Divisional)
- Jeff Zmurchyk: 2010-11 (Divisional and League)

Top Goaltender

- Zak Smith: 2005-06 (Divisional)
- David Tetrault: 2006-07 (Divisional)
- Jason Greenwell: 2009-10 (Divisional and League)
- Andrew Walton: 2010-11 (Divisional)
- Jeff Orser: 2014-15 (Divisional)
- Ethan Fitzgerald: 2019-20 (Divisional)

Top Scorer

- Jesse Niemi: 2009-10 (Divisional)
- Scott Morisseau: 2010-11 (Divisional and League)
