= Sicamous Eagles =

Canadian junior ice hockey team

- City: Sicamous, British Columbia
- League: Kootenay International Junior Hockey League
- Conference: Okanagan/Shuswap
- Division: Bill Ohlhausen
- Founded: 1994–95
- Home arena: Sicamous & District Recreation Centre
- Colours: Red, Navy, White
- President: Dave Strle
- General manager: Shawn Webb
- Head coach: Shawn Webb
- Captain: Nick Wright
- Website: www.sicamouseagles.com/

Franchise history
- 1994–present: Sicamous Eagles

The Sicamous Eagles are a Junior 'A' Ice Hockey team based in Sicamous, British Columbia, Canada. They are members of the Bill Ohlhausen Division of the Okanagan/Shuswap Conference of the Kootenay International Junior Hockey League (KIJHL). They play their home games at Sicamous & District Recreation Centre.

== History ==
=== 1994–2003: Early years ===
The Eagles were founded in 1994, and finished their first season with a record of 36–8. They would win the KIJHL championship over the Castlegar Rebels in the playoffs. The following year, they would finish with a similar record of 35–6–1, losing to Castlegar in the finals again. In 1996–97, they finished third in the Eddie Mountain Division, with a record of 21–21. The following year, they finished fourth in their division, losing in the first round of the playoffs. In 1998–99, they improved to second in the Eddie Mountain Division, behind only the North Okanagan Kings. In 1999–00, they finished second in their division again, and lost to the Nelson Leafs in the league championship. The following year, the Eagles were finished second in their division again, before losing in the second round of the playoffs to the Revelstoke Grizzlies. In 2001–02, the Eagles won the KIJHL championship for the second time, led by the KIJHL's most accomplished alumnus, Shea Weber. They defeated the Beaver Valley Nitehawks 3–1 in the final. They then went on to win the Keystone Cup as British Columbia's top Junior B team. They would win the regular season title again the following year, but lost to Beaver Valley in the championship.

Eagles old logo

=== 2003–present: Recent history ===
The Eagles finished second in the Okanagan-Shushwap Division for the 2003–04 season, with a record of 31–12–4–3, losing in the Division finals to Osoyoos. They lost in the first round the following season to Revelstoke. But in 2005–06, the Eagles won the league title for a third time, defeating Beaver Valley in the final again. The Eagles have yet to win another league title. The 2006–07 Eagles suffered a considerable drop in form, finishing fourth in the Okanagan-Shushwap Division, and losing in the first round to the Kamloops Storm. The following year, the divisions of the KIJHL were re-organized, and the Eagles were moved to the Eddie Mountain Conference, East Division. They finished second in their division, but lost in the Division finals to the Revelstoke Grizzlies. In 2008–09, the league was again re-sorted, and the Eagles finished second in the new Okanagan Division. They would lose in the first round to Kamloops. The following season, they finished third in the Okanagan Division, before losing in the second round to the Princeton Posse. In 2010–11, the Eagles were sorted into the new Doug Birks Division, and finished third again, losing to Kamloops in the first round. The following season, the Eagles would finish fourth in their division, and lost in the second round to the Kelowna Chiefs. In 2012–13, the Eagles improved to second in the Doug Birks Division, losing to the North Okanagan Knights in the Division final. 2013–14 saw the Eagles drop to fourth in the Division again, losing 4–1 in the opening round to the Kamloops Storm. The next season would see an identical result, with the Eagles fourth and losing 4–1 to Kamloops, and this marked the first time in franchise history that the Eagles lost in the first round of the playoffs in two consecutive years. Another franchise low occurred in 2015–16, as the Eagles missed the playoffs for the first time in their history, compiling a 10–34–2–6 record, fifth in the Doug Birks Division.

== Season-by-season record ==
Note: GP = Games played, W = Wins, L = Losses, T = Ties, OTL = Overtime Losses, SOL = Shootout Losses, D = Defaults, Pts = Points, GF = Goals for, GA = Goals against

Season	GP	W	L	T	SOL	Pts	GF	GA	Finish	Playoffs
1994–95	44	36	8	—	0	72	261	144	1st, East	KIJHL Champions; Cyclone Taylor Cup Champions
1995–96	42	35	6	1	—	71	299	140	1st, East	Lost in Finals (Rebels)
1996–97	42	21	21	0	—	42	192	186	3rd, Eddie Mountain	
1997–98	50	21	27	2	—	44	190	225	4th, Eddie Mountain	
1998–99	52	31	19	2	—	64	218	197	2nd, Eddie Mountain	
1999–00	46	28	14	4	—	60	210	164	2nd, Eddie Mountain	Lost in Finals (Leafs)
2000–01	54	35	16	1	2	73	283	196	2nd, Eddie Mountain	Lost in Division Finals, 3–4 (Grizzlies)
2001–02	50	43	5	1	1	88	330	148	1st, Okanagan Shuswap	KIJHL Champions, 3–1 (Nitehawks); Cyclone Taylor Cup Champions; Keystone Cup Champions
2002–03	50	42	5	1	2	87	257	114	1st, Okanagan Shuswap	Lost in Finals, 0–3 (Nitehawks)
2003–04	50	31	12	4	3	69	240	146	2nd, Okanagan Shuswap	Lost in Division Finals, 1–4 (Storm)
2004–05	50	32	16	1	1	66	218	158	2nd, Okanagan Shuswap	Lost in Division Semifinals, 3–4 (Grizzlies)
2005–06	50	42	6	1	1	86	250	122	1st, Okanagan Shuswap	KIJHL Champions, 4–1 (Nitehawks)
2006–07	52	20	24	8	—	48	170	201	4th, Okanagan Shuswap	Lost in Division Semifinals, 1–4 (Storm)
2007–08	52	23	26	3	—	49	156	176	2nd, Eddie Mountain: East	Lost in Division Finals, 3–4 (Grizzlies)
2008–09	52	26	20	6	—	58	184	177	2nd, Okanagan	Lost in League Semifinals, 2–3 (Storm)
2009–10	50	31	15	0	4	66	214	165	3rd, Okanagan	Lost in Division Finals, 0–4 (Posse)
2010–11	50	17	27	2	4	40	167	194	3rd, Doug Birks	Lost in Division Semifinals, 1–4 (Storm)
2011–12	52	22	28	1	1	46	188	189	4th, Doug Birks	Lost in Conference Finals, 1–4 (Chiefs)
2012–13	52	32	13	3	4	71	203	154	2nd, Doug Birks	Lost in Division Finals, 0–4 (Knights)
2013–14	52	23	26	0	3	49	159	170	4th, Doug Birks	Lost in Division Semifinals, 1–4 (Storm)
2014–15	52	26	23	1	2	55	158	176	4th, Doug Birks	Lost in Division Semifinals, 1–4 (Storm)
2015–16	52	10	34	2	6	28	124	224	5th, Doug Birks	Did not qualify
2016–17	47	10	36	0	1	21	104	234	5th of 5 Doug Birks; 18th of 20 – KIJHL	Did not qualify
2017–18	47	6	37	2	2	16	90	236	5th of 5 Doug Birks; 19th of 20 – KIJHL	Did not qualify
2018–19	49	17	24	3	5	42	111	164	3rd of 5 Doug Birks; 14th of 20 – KIJHL	Lost Division Semifinals, 1–4 (Wranglers)
2019–20	49	15	32	1	1	32	140	207	5th of 5 Doug Birks; 17th of 20 – KIJHL	Did not qualify
2020–21	2	1	1	0	0	2	7	10	Remaining season cancelled due to COVID-19	
2021–22	42	14	25	0	3	31	111	140	4th of 5 Doug Birks; 15th of 20 – KIJHL	Lost Division Semifinals, 0–4 (Grizzlies)
2022–23	44	26	15	0	3	55	158	111	3rd of 5 Doug Birks; 17th of 19 – KIJHL	Won Division Semifinals, 4–3 (Storm); Lost Divisionfinal, 0–4 (Grizzlies)
2023–24	44	31	12	0	1	63	190	126	3rd of 5 Doug Birks; 5th of 20 – KIJHL	Lost Division Semifinals, 3–4 (Storm)
2024–25	44	22	16	6	0	50	163	146	4th of 6 Ohlhausen Div; 6th of 11 O/S Conf; 11th of 21 – KIJHL	Lost Division Semifinals, 1–4 (Posse)
2025–26	44	12	28	2	2	28	133	205	6th of 6 Bill Ohlhausen; 10th of 11 O/S Conf; 19th of 21 – KIJHL	Did not qualify
Moving to Independent Western International Junior Hockey League

=== Playoffs ===
Records as of March 4, 2024.

Season	1st Round	2nd Round	3rd Round	Finals
1999–00	Playoff statistics not available			
2000–01	W, 4–1, North Okanagan	L, 3–4, Revelstoke	—	—
2001–02	W, 4–0, Enderby	W, 4–1, Revelstoke	Bye	W, 3–1, Beaver Valley
2002–03	W, 4–0, Revelstoke	W, 4–0, Summerland	Bye	L, 0–3, Beaver Valley
2003–04	W, 4–0, Summerland	L, 1–4, Osoyoos	—	—
2004–05	L, 3–4, Revelstoke	—	—	—
2005–06	W, 4–0, Princeton	W, 4–1, Osoyoos	Bye	W, 4–1, Beaver Valley
2006–07	L, 1–4, Kamloops	—	—	—
2007–08	W, 3–1, Columbia Valley	L, 3–4, Revelstoke	—	—
2008–09	W, 5–2–1, Round-robin	W, 4–3, Chase	L, 2–3, Kamloops	—
2009–10	W, 3–0, Penticton	L, 0–4, Princeton	—	—
2010–11	L, 1–4, Kamloops	—	—	—
2011–12	W, 4–3, Revelstoke	W, 4–3, Kamloops	L, 1–4, Kelowna	—
2012–13	W, 4–1, Revelstoke	L, 0–4, North Okanagan	—	—
2013–14	L, 1–4, Kamloops	—	—	—
2014–15	L, 1–4, Kamloops	—	—	—
2015–16	Did not qualify			
2016–17	Did not qualify			
2017–18	Did not qualify			
2018–19	L, 1–4, 100 Mile House	—	—	—
2019–20	Did not qualify			
2020–21	Playoffs cancelled due to coronavirus pandemic			
2021–22	L, 0–4, Revelstoke	—	—	—
2022–23	W, 4–3, Kamloops	L, 0–4, Revelstoke	—	—
2023–24	L, 3–4, Kamloops	—	—	—
2024–25	L, 1–4, Princeton	—	—	—

Notes

1. Prior to the 2001–02 KIJHL playoffs, there was three rounds only (Division Semifinals, Division Finals and Finals).

== NHL alumni ==
- Kris Beech
- Scott Jackson
- Andrew Ebbett
- Shea Weber
- Deryk Engelland
- Andrew Kozak
- Adrian Veideman

== Awards and trophies ==
Keystone Cup

- 2001–02

Cyclone Taylor Cup

- 1994–95
- 2001–02

KIJHL Championship

- 1994–95
- 2001–02
- 2005–06

Coach of the Year

- Blair Robinson: 2005–06
- Blair Robinson: 2007–08

Most Sportsmanlike

- Ryan Bulach: 2005–06
- Tyler Krause: 2007–08

Most Valuable

- Mark Arnold: 2010–11

Top Goaltender

- Chad Trouton: 2005–06

Top Rookie

- Dustin Sylvester: 2004–05
- Ryan Bulach: 2005–06
