= Princeton Posse =

Canadian junior ice hockey team

- City: Princeton, British Columbia
- League: KIJHL (2002-2026); BCHC (2026-present)
- Division: Interior
- Founded: 1991
- Home arena: Princeton & District Multipurpose Arena
- Colours: Vivid Burgundy, Black and Tan
- President: Randy McLean
- General manager: Mark McNaughton
- Head coach: Colin Minardi (2025-26)
- Captain: Vacant
- Website: princetonposse.org

Franchise history
- 1991–2001: North Okanagan Kings
- 2001–2002: Enderby Ice Kings
- 2002–2026: Princeton Posse (KIJHL)
- 2026–present: Princeton Posse (BCHC)

The Princeton Posse are a Junior ice hockey team based in Princeton, British Columbia, Canada. They are set to play in the British Columbia Hockey Conference (BCHC) beginning in the 2026–27 season after being part of the Kootenay International Junior Hockey League (KIJHL). They play their home games at Princeton & District Multipurpose Arena.

== Season-by-season record ==
Note: GP = Games played, W = Wins, L = Losses, T = Ties, OTL = Overtime Losses, PTS = Points, GF = Goals for, GA = Goals against

Season	GP	W	L	T	OTL	PTS	GF	GA	Finish	Playoffs
2002–03	50	13	29	4	4	34	175	223	5th, Okanagan Shuswap	Did not qualify
2003–04	50	15	27	7	1	38	184	242	5th, Okanagan Shuswap	Lost Division Semifinals, 0–4 (Rockies)
2004–05	50	5	40	1	4	15	138	302	5th, Okanagan Shuswap	Did not qualify
2005–06	50	15	32	0	3	33	153	237	4th, Okanagan Shuswap	Lost Division Semifinals, 0–4 (Eagles)
2006–07	52	18	30	4	0	40	155	204	5th, Okanagan Shuswap	Did not qualify
2007–08	52	29	18	5	0	63	171	159	1st, Eddie Mountain	Lost division finals, 0–4 (Storm)
2008–09	52	25	23	4	0	47	163	195	4th, Okanagan	Lost division finals, 0–4 (Storm)
2009–10	50	31	13	0	6	68	221	173	2nd, Okanagan	W, DivisionFinals 4–0, Sicamous; Lost Conference Finals, 0–4 (Grizzlies)
2010–11	50	16	28	3	3	38	147	203	3rd, Okanagan	Lost Division Semifinals, 3–4 (Chiefs)
2011–12	52	28	19	1	4	61	217	196	2nd, Okanagan	Lost division finals, 1–4 (Chiefs)
2012–13	52	34	16	0	2	70	203	135	2nd, Okanagan	Lost Division Semifinals, 1–4 (Coyotes)
2013–14	52	16	30	0	6	38	180	235	5th, Okanagan	Did not qualify
2014–15	52	22	25	3	2	49	146	149	4th, Okanagan	Lost Division Semifinals, 1–4 (Coyotes)
2015–16	52	9	32	2	2	22	94	207	5th of 5, Okanagan; 19th of 20, KIJHL	Did not qualify
2016–17	47	12	29	1	5	30	99	164	5th of 5, Okanagan; 17th of 20, KIJHL	Did not qualify
2017–18	47	17	24	2	4	40	130	177	4th of 5, Okanagan; 14th of 20, KIJHL	Lost Division Semifinals, 0–4 (Coyotes)
2018–19	49	19	25	1	4	43	128	175	3rd of 5, Okanagan; 12th of 20, KIJHL	Lost Division Semifinals, 1–4 (Steam)
2019–20	47	27	16	1	5	60	175	155	2nd of 5, Bill Ohlhausen; 8th of 20, KIJHL	Won Division Semifinals, 4-0 (Steam); Incomplete Div Final 1-1 (Chiefs); Playoffs cancelled due to covid-19
2020–21	3	1	2	0	0	2	6	7	season cancelled due to COVID-19	
2021–22	42	15	24	0	3	33	124	165	4th of 5, Bill Ohlhausen; 14th of 19, KIJHL	Lost Division Semifinals, 1-4 (Coyotes)
2022–23	44	31	7	3	3	68	181	110	1st of 5, Bill Ohlhausen; 1st of 19, KIJHL	Won Division Semifinals, 4-0 (Steam); Won Division Final 4-1 (Knights); Won Conference Finals 4-2 (Grizzlies); Lost League Finals 3-4(Dynamiters)
2023–24	44	35	8	0	1	71	208	96	1st of 5, Bill Ohlhausen; 1st of 20, KIJHL	Won Division Semifinals, 4-1 (Chiefs); Won Div. Finals, 4-3 (Knights); Lost Conference Finals 3-4 (Grizzlies)
2024–25	44	33	7	3	1	70	192	99	1st of 5, Bill Ohlhausen; 1st of 11 O/S Conf; 2nd of 21	Won Division Semifinals, 4-1 (Eagles); Lost Div. Finals, 2-4 (Grizzlies)

== Notable alumni ==
- Connor McGarry - Aurora Tigers, OJHL - won Canadian National Jr. A title (Royal Bank Cup)
- Cody Devitt - Yorkton Terriers, SJHL - signed pro with Rocky Mountain Rage of the Central Hockey League
- Chad Hohmann – Seattle Thunderbirds, WHL, York University
- Jordan Kerr - Dauphin Kings, MJHL
- Seth Armitage - Utah State Aggies, ACHA
- David Wyman - Utah State Aggies, ACHA
- Jamie Sparkes - Brockville Braves, CCHL
- Micah Anderson - Westside Warriors, BCHL
- Brad Davis - Penticton Vees, BCHL
- Jesse Tresierra - Langley Chiefs, BCHL
- Evan Karembelas – Powell River Kings, BCHL
- Michael Bunting – Notre Dame Hounds SJHL
- Mike Salter - Fort William North Stars, SIJHL
- Eric Galbraith - Quesnel Millionaires, BCHL
- Jordan Lane - Moncton Wildcats, QMJHL
- Liam Darragh - Chilliwack Bruins, WHL
- Alex Young - Alaska Avalanche NAHL
- Brett VanRiper – Portage College, ACAC
- Brenden Stephen – Everett Silvertips, WHL Trinity Western University
- Brad Goss – Langley Chiefs, BCHL - Team Rookie of Year Award winner.
- Andrew Walsh – Langley Chiefs, BCHL
- Scott Ramsay – Chilliwack Bruins, WHL
- Jeremy Wagner – Hannover Indians, Oberliga, Germany
- Logan Johnston – Penticton Vees, BCHL
- Kyle L’Arrivee – Mount Royal College, ACAC
- Kieran Friesen – Edmonton Oil Kings, WHL
- Dylan McKinlay – Chilliwack Bruins, WHL (Drafted by Minnesota Wild in 2010)
- Michael Garteig – Powell River Kings, BCHL
- Spencer Brooks – Portage College, ACAC
- Matt Chomyc – Yorkton Terriers, SJHL
- Nate Rempel – Lloydminster Bobcats, AJHL
- Jaden Fodchuk – Cranbrook Bucks, British Columbia Junior Hockey League | Simon Fraser University
