= Scott Jackson (ice hockey) =

Canadian ice hockey player

- Born: February 5, 1987 (age 39) Salmon Arm, British Columbia, Canada
- Height: 6 ft 3 in (191 cm)
- Weight: 213 lb (97 kg; 15 st 3 lb)
- Position: Defence
- Shot: Left
- Played for: Tampa Bay Lightning
- NHL draft: 37th overall, 2005; St. Louis Blues
- Playing career: 2008–2012

Scott Jackson (born February 5, 1987) is a Canadian former professional ice hockey defenceman who played in one game for the Tampa Bay Lightning of the National Hockey League (NHL). He was selected by the St. Louis Blues in the second round (37th overall) of the 2005 NHL entry draft.

== Playing career ==
Signed as a free agent on July 3, 2008 by the Tampa Bay Lightning, Jackson was called up to the "Bolts" from the American Hockey League's Norfolk Admirals on April 11, 2010. Jackson went on to make his NHL debut later that day when the Lightning visited the Florida Panthers in the final game of the 2009-10 regular season.

== Career statistics ==
=== Regular season and playoffs ===
			Regular season					Playoffs
Season	Team	League	GP	G	A	Pts	PIM	GP	G	A	Pts	PIM
2002–03	Sicamous Eagles	KIJHL	45	2	20	22	20	—	—	—	—	—
2002–03	Seattle Thunderbirds	WHL	2	0	0	0	2	—	—	—	—	—
2003–04	Seattle Thunderbirds	WHL	66	4	9	13	17	—	—	—	—	—
2004–05	Seattle Thunderbirds	WHL	72	6	16	22	46	12	1	2	3	4
2005–06	Seattle Thunderbirds	WHL	57	3	23	26	48	7	1	4	5	12
2006–07	Seattle Thunderbirds	WHL	71	4	31	35	52	11	0	5	5	9
2007–08	Seattle Thunderbirds	WHL	58	6	17	23	44	12	2	2	4	8
2008–09	Norfolk Admirals	AHL	34	0	4	4	14	—	—	—	—	—
2008–09	Mississippi Sea Wolves	ECHL	3	1	0	1	2	—	—	—	—	—
2009–10	Norfolk Admirals	AHL	72	1	14	15	32	—	—	—	—	—
2009–10	Tampa Bay Lightning	NHL	1	0	0	0	0	—	—	—	—	—
2010–11	Norfolk Admirals	AHL	68	1	4	5	47	6	0	0	0	0
2011–12	Norfolk Admirals	AHL	66	0	8	8	53	14	0	1	1	15
AHL totals			240	2	30	32	146	20	0	1	1	15
NHL totals			1	0	0	0	0	—	—	—	—	—

=== International ===
Year	Team	Event	GP	G	A	Pts	PIM
2004	Canada Pacific	U17	6	0	3	3	0
Junior totals			6	0	3	3	0

== See also ==
- List of players who played only one game in the NHL
