= Kimberley Dynamiters (BCHC) =

Canadian junior ice hockey team

- City: Kimberley, British Columbia
- League: KIJHL (2001-2026); BCHC (2026-present)
- Conference: Kootenay
- Division: Eddie Mountain
- Founded: 1972–73
- Home arena: Kimberley Civic Centre
- Colours: Red, Black and White
- President: James Leroux
- General manager: Derek Stuart
- Head coach: Derek Stuart
- Captain: Callan Valstar
- Website: www.kimberleydynamiters.ca/

Franchise history
- 1972–1990: Kimberley Knights
- 1991–2001: Kimberley Dynamiters (RMJHL)
- 2001–2026: Kimberley Dynamiters (KIJHL)
- 2026-present: Kimberley Dynamiters (BCHC)

The Kimberley Dynamiters are a Junior 'A' Ice Hockey team based in Kimberley, British Columbia, Canada. They are set to compete in the Kootenay Division in the British Columbia Hockey Conference (BCHC) beginning in the 2026–27 season after playing in the Kootenay International Junior Hockey League (KIJHL). They play their home games at Kimberley Civic Centre.

The team began play in 1991, in the Rocky Mountain Junior Hockey League. Kimberley also had a team, the Knights, in the KIJHL between 1972 and 1989.

== History ==
The Kimberley Dynamiters name was previously used by Kimberley's now defunct senior hockey clubs that played in the WKHL, the ABCSL, and the WIHL between 1932 and 1981.

The Kimberley Knights won the KIJHL in 1979/80 and the same year won the Cyclone Taylor Cup. Later, as the Dynamiters, Kimberley won the Rocky Mountain Junior Hockey League championship in 1994 and 1999 as a Junior 'A' team. Under head Coach Jerry Bancks who previously coached the Junior 'A' team to a Rocky Mountain championship, The Dynamiters won the 2014/15 KIJHL Championship against the Kamloops Storm in a seven-game series 4 games to 2, They also placed second at the Cyclone Taylor Cup losing to the eventual Western Canadian Champions Campbell River Storm.

Captain Jason Richter was named divisional most valuable player and top scorer for division and league, Jordan Busch was named top Defenseman in the Eddie Mountain division while Coy Prevost was awarded Divisional Rookie of the year. Goaltender Tyson Brouwer was awarded the Playoff most valuable player.

On April 20, 2026, the Dynamiters were named as one of 22 teams joining the BCHC, leaving the KIJHL with the remaining 12 teams.

== Season-by-season record ==
Note: GP = Games played, W = Wins, L = Losses, T = Ties, OTL = Overtime Losses, Pts = Points, GF = Goals for, GA = Goals against

Records as of February 17, 2024.

Season	GP	W	L	T	OTL	Pts	GF	GA	Finish	Playoffs
1972–73	30	11	18	1	—	23	143	181	3rd, East	
1973–74	30	17	12	1	—	35	203	157	2nd, East	
1974–75	34	10	24	0	—	20	179	228	3rd, East	
1975–76	34	21	12	1	—	43	193	158	2nd, East	
1976–77	44	19	23	2	—	40	188	203	3rd, East	
1977–78	42	15	27	0	—	30	182	232	4th, East	
1978–79	40	24	14	2	—	50	251	196	3rd, East	
1979–80	40	28	11	1	—	57	252	192	2nd, East	KIJHL Champions (Smoke Eaters)
1980–81	40	28	11	1	—	57	234	166	2nd, East	
1981–82	42	25	14	3	—	53	262	217	2nd, East	
1982–83	42	15	27	0	—	30	197	248	5th, East	
1983–84	42	19	23	0	—	38	236	242	3rd, East	
1984–85	42	13	28	1	—	27	229	326	5th, East	
1985–86	37	6	31	0	—	12	156	310	5th, East	
1986–87	42	6	36	0	—	12	156	359	4th, East	
1987–88	42	17	24	1	—	35	220	241	4th, East	
1988–89	43	23	19	1	—	47	212	206	3rd, East	
1989–90	40	7	33	0	—	14	189	296	5th, East	
1990–91	Did Not Participate									
Season	GP	W	L	T	SOL	Pts	GF	GA	Finish	Playoffs
1991–92	52	15	35	2	—	32	218	276	4th, Kootenay	Lost Div. Semifinals, 0–4 (Smoke Eaters)
1992–93	52	32	20	—	0	64	274	224	2nd, Kootenay	Lost Div. Semifinals, 2–4 (Colts)
1993–94	52	40	9	—	3	83	339	178	1st, Kootenay	RMJHL Champions, 4–1 (Huskies)
1994–95	52	26	25	—	1	53	263	255	3rd, Kootenay	Lost Div. Semifinals, 0–4 (Colts)
1995–96	58	30	25	—	3	63	244	268	4th, Kootenay	Lost Div. Finals, 0–4 (Ghostriders)
1996–97	60	26	34	—	0	52	243	282	6th, RMJHL	Lost Semifinals, 0–4 (Ghostriders)
1997–98	54	49	5	—	0	98	419	196	1st, RMJHL	Lost Finals, 3–4 (Colts)
1998–99	45	28	14	—	3	59	188	159	1st, RMJHL	RMJHL Champions, 4–2 (Ghostriders)
1999–00	58	30	24	—	4	64	223	204	5th, AWHL	
Season	GP	W	L	OTL	SOL	Pts	GF	GA	Finish	Playoffs
2000–01	60	34	24	2	0	70	221	227	4th, AWHL	
Season	GP	W	L	T	OTL	Pts	GF	GA	Finish	Playoffs
2001–02	50	21	20	4	5	51	195	206	2nd, Eddie Mountain	Lost in Division Finals, 2–4 (Rockies)
2002–03	50	24	19	6	1	55	216	173	2nd, Eddie Mountain	Lost in League Semifinals, 0–3 (Nitehawks)
2003–04	50	19	23	6	2	46	216	217	2nd, Eddie Mountain	Lost in Division Finals, 1–4 (Rockies)
2004–05	50	31	15	0	4	66	238	194	1st, Eddie Mountain	Lost in League Semifinals, 0–3 (Nitehawks)
2005–06	50	28	15	5	2	63	225	162	2nd, Eddie Mountain	Lost in Division Finals, 3–4 (Ghostriders)
Season	GP	W	L	OTL	D	Pts	GF	GA	Finish	Playoffs
2006–07	52	22	26	4	0	48	189	227	3rd, Eddie Mountain	Lost in Division Semifinals, 3–4 (Thunder Cats)
2007–08	52	25	21	6	0	56	206	192	3rd, Neil Murdoch: East	Lost in Division Finals, 3–4 (Ghostriders)
2008–09	52	28	17	7	0	63	193	183	4th, Eddie Mountain	Lost in Division Finals, 1–4 (Ghostriders)
Season	GP	W	L	T	OTL	Pts	GF	GA	Finish	Playoffs
2009–10	50	26	19	1	4	57	175	149	3rd, Eddie Mountain	Lost in Division Semifinals, 2–4 (Thunder Cats)
2010–11	50	18	28	2	2	40	185	234	4th, Eddie Mountain	Lost in Division Semifinals, 0–4 (Ghostriders)
2011–12	52	36	14	1	1	74	279	162	2nd, Eddie Mountain	Lost in Division Finals, 3–4 (Ghostriders)
2012–13	52	26	25	0	1	53	171	194	3rd, Eddie Mountain	Lost in Division Semifinals, 0–4 (Rockets)
2013–14	52	41	7	0	4	86	176	157	2nd, Eddie Mountain	Lost in Division Finals, 3–4 (Thunder Cats)
2014–15	52	32	15	2	3	69	226	124	2nd, Eddie Mountain	KIJHL Champions, 4–2 (Storm)
2015–16	52	29	21	2	0	60	211	109	1st, Eddie Mountain	Lost Finals, 1–4 (Wranglers)
2016–17	47	33	13	1	1	67	211	141	2 of 5 Eddie Mountain; 5th of 20 KIJHL	Lost Division Finals, 2–3 (Nitehawks)
2017–18	47	38	7	1	1	78	199	112	1 of 5 Eddie Mountain; 1st of 20 KIJHL	KIJHL Champions, 4–2 (Grizzlies) advance to Cyclone Taylor Cup
2018–19	49	43	4	1	1	88	244	94	1 of 5 Eddie Mountain; 2nd of 20 KIJHL	Won Div Semifinals 4–0 (Rockets); Won Div Finals 4–0 (Ghostriders); Won Conf Finals 4–1 (Nitehawks); Lost League Finals 1–4 (Grizzlies)
2019–20	49	40	6	0	3	83	198	111	1 of 5 Eddie Mountain; 1st of 20 KIJHL	Won Div Semifinals 1–4 (Thunder Cats); Incomplete Div Final 2–0 (Rockies); Playoffs cancelled due to COVID-19
2020–21	3	1	1	1	0	3	13	9	Remaining season cancelled due to COVID-19	
2021–22	42	31	9	0	2	64	157	84	1 of 4 Eddie Mountain; 4th of 19 KIJHL	Won Div Semifinals 4–0 (Thunder Cats); Won Div Final 4–2 (Rockies); Lost Conf finals 2–4 (Leafs)
2022–23	44	28	10	2	4	62	136	106	2 of 5 Eddie Mountain; 2nd of 19 KIJHL	Won Div Semifinals 4–1 (Rockets); Won Div Finals 4–3 (Ghostriders); Won Conf Finals 4–0 (Nitehawks); Won League Finals 4–3 (Princeton Posse) advance to Cyclone Taylor Cup
2023–24	44	29	13	0	2	60	171	113	2 of 5 Eddie Mountain; 8th of 20 KIJHL	Lost Div Semifinals 1-4 (Rockies); Advance to Mowat Cup as HOSTS
2024–25	44	32	9	0	3	67	191	142	1 of 5 Eddie Mountain; 4th of 21 KIJHL	Won Div Semifinals 4-2 (Thunder Cats); Won Div Final 4–1 (Rockies); Lost Conf finals 2–4 (Border Bruins)

=== Playoffs ===
Records as of February 29, 2024.

Season	1st Round	2nd Round	3rd Round	Finals
1991–92	L, 0–4, Trail	—	—	—
1992–93	L, 2–4, Cranbrook	—	—	—
1993–94	W, 4–0, Fernie	W, 4–1, Cranbrook	—	W, 4–1, Fort St. John
1994–95	L, 0–4, Cranbrook	—	—	—
1995–96	W, 4–2, Cranbrook	L, 0–4, Fernie	—	—
1996–97	W, 4–3, Cranbrook	L, 0–4, Fernie	—	—
1997–98	Bye	W, 4–0, Nelson	—	L, 3–4, Cranbrook
1998–99	W, 4–0, Creston Valley	—	—	W, 4–2, Fernie
1999–01	Playoff statistics not available			
2001–02	W, 4–3, Creston Valley	L, 2–4, Columbia Valley	—	—
2002–03	W, 4–3, Creston Valley	W, 4–2, Columbia Valley	L, 0–3, Beaver Valley	—
2003–04	W, 4–1, Creston Valley	L, 1–4, Columbia Valley	—	—
2004–05	W, 4–2, Fernie	W, 4–3, Columbia Valley	L, 0–3, Beaver Valley	—
2005–06	W, 4–2, Columbia Valley	L, 3–4, Fernie	—	—
2006–07	L, 3–4, Creston Valley	—	—	—
2007–08	W, 3–1, Creston Valley	L, 3–4, Fernie	—	—
2008–09	W, 4–1, Creston Valley	L, 1–4, Fernie	—	—
2009–10	L, 2–4, Creston Valley	—	—	—
2010–11	L, 0–4, Fernie	—	—	—
2011–12	W, 4–2, Creston Valley	L, 3–4, Fernie	—	—
2012–13	L, 0–4, Golden	—	—	—
2013–14	W, 4–1, Fernie	L, 3–4, Creston Valley	—	—
2014–15	W, 4–1, Creston Valley	W, 4–2, Fernie	W, 4–1, Beaver Valley	W, 4–2, Kamloops
2015–16	W, 4–1, Fernie	W, 4–0, Creston Valley	W, 4–1, Beaver Valley	L, 1–4, 100 Mile House
2016–17	W, 4–2, Fernie	W, 4–2, Creston Valley	L, 2–3, Beaver Valley	—
2017–18	W, 4–1, Fernie	W, 4–1 Columbia Valley	W, 4–2, Nelson	W, 4–2 Revelstoke
2018–19	W, 4–0, Golden	W, 4–0, Fernie	W, 4–1, Beaver Valley	L, 1–4 Revelstoke
2019–20	W, 4–1, Creston Valley	2–0, Columbia Valley	Remainder cancelled due to COVID-19	
2020–21	Playoffs cancelled due to coronavirus pandemic			
2021–22	W, 4–0, Golden	W, 4–2, Columbia Valley	L, 2–4, Nelson	—
2022-23	W, 4–1, Golden	W, 4–3, Fernie	W, 4–0, Beaver Valley	W, 4–3, Princeton
2023-24	L, 1–4, Columbia Valley	—	—	—
2024-25	W, 4–2, Creston Valley	W, 4–1, Columbia Valley	L, 1–4, Grand Forks	—

Notes

1. The RMJHL playoffs had three rounds.
2. The final 1998–99 RMJHL playoffs had two rounds.

=== Mowat Cup ===
Season	Championship Series
1993–94	L, 0–3, Kelowna
1998–99	L, 1–3, Vernon

=== Cyclone Taylor Cup ===
Year	Gold Medal Game			Bronze Medal Game		
Year	Champions	Score	Finalists	Third Place	Score	Fourth Place
2008	Grandview Steelers; PIJHL	4–3	Kimberley Dynamiters; KIJHL	Fernie Ghostriders; KIJHL	5–3	Victoria Cougars; VIJHL

Season	Round Robin	Record	Standing	Bronze Medal Game	Gold Medal Game
2015	W, Mission City Outlaws 2–1; OTL, Campbell River Storm 3–4; OTW, N. Vancouver Wolf Pack 5–4	2–0–1	2nd of 4	n/a	L, Campbell River 5–6; Silver Medalists
2018	L, Delta Ice Hawks 0–3; W, Richmond Sockeyes 6–1; L, Campbell River Storm 0–9	1–2–0	4th of 4	W, Campbell River Storm 7–1; Bronze Medalists	n/a
2023	W, Delta Ice Hawks 2–1; L, Revelstoke Grizzlies 1–4; W, Oceanside Generals 5–3	2–1–0	2nd of 4	n/a	L, Revelstoke Grizzlies 1-4; Silver Medalists

== Mowat Cup ==
Established 2024 - KIJHL - PJHL - VIJHL prompted from Jr. B to Jr A

Season	Round Robin	Record	Standing	Bronze Medal Game	Gold Medal Game
2024; HOST	L, Ridge Meadows 0-7; L, Revelstoke 1-3; W, Saanich 4-0	1-2-0	4th of 4	L, Saanich, 0-3	n/a

Notes

1. The Kimberley Dynamiters hosted the 2008 Cyclone Taylor Cup in Kimberley, British Columbia, at the Kimberley Civic Centre.

== NHL alumni ==
- Jim Hiller
- Larry Giroux
- Mike McBain
- Spence Tatchell
- Jason McBain
- Drayson Bowman
- Norm Larson
- Jim McCrimmon
- Gord Turlick
- Don Campbell
- Seth Martin
- Jack Pratt
- Jason Wiemer
- Jack Forsey
- Ken McAuley
- Dave Scatchard
- Marty Zoborosky
- Carter Bancks

== Awards and trophies ==
Most Sportsmanlike

- Leo Keefer: 2008–2009
- Leo Keefer: 2007–2008
- James Jowsey: 2014–2015

Top Scorer

- Tommy Latouche-Gauvin: 2007–2008
- Mike Whitequills: 2006–2007
- Chris Kostiuk: 2005–2006
- Chris Kostiuk: 2004–2005
- Jason Richter: 2014–2015
- Eric Buckely: 2015–2016

Most Valuable Player

- Chris Kostiuk: 2005–2006
- Chris Kostiuk: 2004–2005
- Jason Richter: 2014–2015
- Tyson Brouwer: 2015–2016

Rookie of the year

- Drayson Bowman: 2004–2005
- Coy Prevost: 2014–2015
- George Bertoia: 2015–2016
