= List of ice hockey teams in Manitoba =

The following is a list of ice hockey teams in Manitoba, past and present. It includes the league(s) they play for, and championships won.

== Professional ==
=== National Hockey League ===
Current teams
Team	City	Established	Stanley Cups	Notes
Winnipeg Jets	Winnipeg	2011	0	Founded in 1999 as the Atlanta Thrashers

Former teams
Team	City	Years active	Stanley Cups	Notes
Winnipeg Jets	Winnipeg	1979–1996	0	Founded in 1972 as a World Hockey Association franchise; Became Phoenix Coyotes in 1996

=== World Hockey Association ===
Team	City	Years active	Avco Cups	Notes
Winnipeg Jets (1972–1996)	Winnipeg	1972–1979	3	Joined the NHL in 1979

=== American Hockey League ===
Team	City	Established	Calder Cups	Notes
Manitoba Moose	Winnipeg	2001	0	Founded in 1996 as an IHL franchise, existed as St. John's IceCaps from 2011–2015

=== International Hockey League ===
Team	City	Years active	Turner Cups	Notes
Manitoba Moose	Winnipeg	1996–2001	0	Founded in 1994 as the Minnesota Moose; joined AHL in 2001

=== Western Hockey League (1952–1974) ===
Team	City	Years active	Lester Patrick Cups	Notes
Brandon Regals	Brandon	1955–1957	1	
Winnipeg Warriors (minor pro)	Winnipeg	1955–1961	1	

== Junior ==
=== Western Hockey League ===
Current teams
Team	City	Established	President's Cups	Memorial Cups	Notes
Brandon Wheat Kings	Brandon	1968	3	0	

Former teams
Team	City	Years active	President's Cups	Memorial Cups	Notes
Flin Flon Bombers (WHL)	Flin Flon	1967–1978	2	0	Became Edmonton Oil Kings in 1978
Winnipeg Jets (WHL)	Winnipeg	1967–1973	0	0	Became the Winnipeg Clubs in 1973
Winnipeg Clubs	Winnipeg	1973–1976	0	0	Became the Winnipeg Monarchs in 1976
Winnipeg Ice	Winnipeg	2019–2023	0	0	Founded in 1996 as Edmonton Ice; became the Wenatchee Wild in 2023
Winnipeg Monarchs (WHL)	Winnipeg	1976–1977	0	0	Became the Calgary Wranglers (WHL) in 1977
Winnipeg Warriors	Winnipeg	1980–1984	0	0	Became the Moose Jaw Warriors in 1984

=== Manitoba Junior Hockey League ===
Current Teams
Team	City	Established	League titles	ANAVET Cups	Nat'l Jr. A Titles	Notes
Dauphin Kings	Dauphin	1967	7	1	0	
Neepawa Titans	Neepawa	1989	0	0	0	formerly Neepawa Natives (1989–2021)
Niverville Nighthawks	Niverville	2022	1	0	1	
Northern Manitoba Blizzard	The Pas	1996	5	1	0	
Portage Terriers	Portage la Prairie	1942	10	2	2	original club 1942–1947; reestablished in 1967
Selkirk Steelers	Selkirk	1966	11	3	1	
Steinbach Pistons	Steinbach	1988	3	1	0	relocated from Beausejour in 2009
Swan Valley Stampeders	Swan River	1999	0	0	0	
Virden Oil Capitals	Virden	1956	4	1	0	relocated from Winnipeg in 2012
Waywayseecappo Wolverines	Waywayseecappo	1999	0	0	0	
Winkler Flyers	Winkler	1973	3	0	0	
Winnipeg Blues	Winnipeg	1930	17	2	0	formerly Fort Garry/Winnipeg South Blues, see Winnipeg Monarchs (1930–1978)
Winnipeg Freeze	Winnipeg	2020	0	0	0	

Former Teams
Team	City	Years active	League titles	ANAVET Cups	Abbott Cups	Nat'l Jr. A titles	Notes
Beausejour Blades	Beausjour	2007–2009	0	0	0	0	became Steinbach Pistons
Brandon Elks/Wheat Kings	Brandon	1936–1967	8	0	1	0	
Brandon Travellers	Brandon	1973–1980	0	0	0	0	
CUAC Blues	Winnipeg	1939–1945	0	0	0	0	
East Kildonan Bisons	East Kildonan	1940–1942	0	0	0	0	
Elmwood Maple Leafs	Winnipeg	1933–1940	3	2	1	0	
Elmwood Millionaires	Winnipeg	1924–1931	6	0	1	0	
Fort Rouge Wanderers	Winnipeg	1917–1918	0	0	0	0	
Kildonan North Stars	Winnipeg	1967–1990	1	0	0	0	
Manitoba Bisons	Winnipeg	1921–1937	1	0	0	0	
Selkirk Fishermen (MJHL)	Selkirk	1917–1935	2	1	1	0	
Southeast Thunderbirds/Blades	Winnipeg/Sagkeeng	1988–2007	0	0	0	0	became Beausejour Blades
St. Boniface Athletics	St. Boniface	1939–1945	0	0	0	0	
St. Boniface Canadiens	St. Boniface	1952–1967	5	0	1	0	became Kildonan Stars
St. Boniface Saints	Winnipeg	1967–2000	3	1	0	0	became Winnipeg Saints
St. Boniface Seals	St. Boniface	1934–1939	1	0	1	1	
St. James Canadians/St. James Orioles	Winnipeg	1935–1945	1	0	0	0	became Winnipeg Canadiens
St. James Canadians	Winnipeg	1956–2003	5	0	1	1	
St. Vital Greyhounds	St. Vital	1924–1931	0	0	0	0	
Steinbach Hawks	Steinbach	1985–1988	0	0	0	0	
Thompson King Miners	Thompson	1975–1978	0	0	0	0	
Winnipeg Argonauts	Winnipeg	1917–1927	0	0	0	0	
Winnipeg Barons	Winnipeg	1952–1957	0	0	0	0	
Winnipeg Black Hawks	Winnipeg	1947–1952	0	0	0	0	became Winnipeg Barons
Winnipeg Canadiens	Winnipeg	1946–1952	0	0	0	0	became St. Boniface Canadiens
Winnipeg Junior Falcons	Winnipeg	1920–1942	1	0	1	1	
Winnipeg Monarchs (1930–1978)	Winnipeg	1930–1978	10	0	5	3	became Fort Garry Blues
Winnipeg Pilgrims	Winnipeg	1918–1929	0	0	0	0	
Winnipeg Rangers (1939–1957)	Winnipeg	1939–1947	2	0	2	2	became Winnipeg Black Hawks
Winnipeg Rangers (1956–1967)	Winnipeg	1956–1967	2	0	0	0	became St. Boniface Saints
Winnipeg Saints	Winnipeg	2000–2012	0	0	0	0	became Virden Oil Capitals
Wolseley Flyers	Winnipeg	1942–1943	0	0	0	0	

=== Saskatchewan Junior Hockey League ===
Team	City	Established	League titles	ANAVET Cup	Western Canada Cups	Nat'l Jr. A Titles	Notes
Flin Flon Bombers	Flin Flon	1978	1	1	0	0	

=== Capital Region Junior Hockey League ===
Team	City	Established	League titles	Notes
Altona Maroons	Altona	2026	0	
Arborg Ice Dawgs	Arborg	2006	0	Former member of KJHL (2006–2018)
Beausejour Comets	Beausejour	2022	0	
La Broquerie Habs	La Broquerie	2024	1	
Lundar Falcons	Lundar	2010	0	Former member of KJHL (2010–2018)
North Winnipeg Satelites	Winnipeg	1980	0	Former member of MJBHL/KJHL (1980–2018)
Selkirk Fishermen	Selkirk	1918	3	Former member of MJBHL/KJHL (1977–2018)
St. Malo Warriors	St. Malo	1963	2	Former member of MJBHL/KJHL (1977–2018)

=== Keystone Junior Hockey League ===
Team	City	Established	Keystone Cup	Notes
Cross Lake Islanders	Cross Lake	2005	0	Folded in 2010, rejoined in 2015
Fisher River Hawks	Fisher River	2014	0	Folded in 2018
NCN Flames	Nisichawayasihk	2019	0	
Norway House North Stars	Norway House	2005	0	
Peguis Juniors	Peguis	1994	0	
OCN Storm	Opaskwayak	2012	1	

=== Hanover Tache Junior Hockey League ===
Team	Town	League titles
Grunthal Red Wings	Grunthal	3
La Broquerie Habs	La Broquerie	5
Lorette Comets	Lorette/Île-des-Chênes	1
Mitchell Mohawks	Mitchell	2
Niverville Clippers	Niverville	1
Red River Mudbugs	St. Jean Baptiste	0
Springfield Xtreme	Oakbank	0
Steinbach Huskies	Steinbach	8

=== Manitoba Major Junior Hockey League ===
Team	Town
Charleswood Hawks	Winnipeg
Fort Garry/Fort Rouge Twins	Winnipeg
Pembina Valley Twisters	Morris
River East Royal Knights	Winnipeg
St. Boniface Riels	Winnipeg
St. James Canucks	Winnipeg
St. Vital Victorias	Winnipeg
Raiders Junior Hockey Club	Winnipeg
Stonewall Jets	Stonewall
Transcona Railer Express	Winnipeg

== Semi-professional, senior and amateur ==
=== Senior ===
Team	City	Years active	Allan Cups	Runners up	Notes
Brandon HC	Brandon			1921	
Ile des Chenes North Stars	Île-des-Chênes		2003		2009 Allan Cup host (as Steinbach North Stars)
South East Prairie Thunder	Steinbach/Winnipeg	2004–2020	2012, 2015	2009, 2016	2016 Allan Cup host
St. Boniface Mohawks	Winnipeg	1967–1994		1968, 1973, 1981, 1983, 1989, 1994	
Steinbach Huskies	Steinbach	Since 1935		1979	
University of Manitoba Bisons	Winnipeg	1919	1928		
Warroad Lakers	Warroad, Minnesota	1946–1997	1994, 1995, 1996	1997	
Winnipeg 61st Battalion	Winnipeg		1916		
Winnipeg Falcons	Winnipeg		1920		Won the 1920 Olympic gold medal
Winnipeg Hockey Club	Winnipeg		1913, 1931		
Winnipeg Maroons	Winnipeg		1964	1961, 1963	
Winnipeg Monarchs	Winnipeg	1906–1936	1915		1935 World Ice Hockey Champions
Winnipeg Selkirks	Winnipeg			1919, 1924	
Winnipeg Victorias	Winnipeg		1911, 1912	1917	
Winnipeg Ypres	Winnipeg			1918	

=== Stanley Cup Challenge Era ===
Team	City	Years active	League titles	Stanley Cups	Notes
Winnipeg Maple Leafs	Winnipeg	1890s–1900s		-	
Winnipeg Victorias	Winnipeg			3	

=== University ===
Brandon University Bobcats	Brandon	Years active	University Cups	Notes
Manitoba Bisons (men's ice hockey)	Winnipeg	Since 1919	1	
Manitoba Bisons (women's ice hockey)	Winnipeg	Since 2000	0	

=== Western Women's Hockey League ===
Team	City	Years active	League titles	Notes
Manitoba Maple Leafs	Winnipeg	2010–2014	0	Continued as an independent club after WWHL folded in 2012

== League, regional and national championships ==
Championship	Times won	Description
Stanley Cup	3	Canadian amateur champion
Avco World Trophy	3	World Hockey Association champion
Lester Patrick Cup	2	Western Hockey League champion
President's Cup	5	Western Hockey League champion
Memorial Cup	9	Canadian Major-Junior national champion
Allan Cup	12	Canadian senior national champion
ANAVET Cup	15 (Note: Includes win by the Flin Flon Bombers of the SJHL)	Manitoba/Saskatchewan Junior "A" regional championship
Centennial Cup	4	CJHL national championship
Keystone Cup	2	Western Canada Junior "B" champion
University Cup	1	CIS national men's university champion
Telus Cup	2	Canadian men's under-18 championship
Esso Cup	2	Canadian women's under-18 championship

== See also ==
- Hockey Manitoba
