= Keystone Cup =

Western Canada junior ice hockey championship founded 1983

- Sport: Ice hockey
- Awarded for: Junior B hockey champions of: Western Canada (1983–2017); Manitoba/Northwestern Ontario (2018–2022); Central Canada (2023–present)
- Country: Canada

History
- Most wins: Assiniboia Southern Rebels 3; Kinistino Tigers 3
- Most recent: St. Paul Canadiens
- Website: keystonecup.ca

The Keystone Cup is the Junior B ice hockey championship and trophy for Western Canada. From 1983 to 2017, the championship was the culmination of the champions of 12 hockey leagues in British Columbia, Alberta, Saskatchewan, Manitoba, and Northwestern Ontario. In 2018, citing costs for travel and accommodations, British Columbia, Alberta and Saskatchewan withdrew from competition for the Keystone Cup, making it a championship between Manitoba and Northwestern Ontario.

There is no national championship for Junior B hockey in Canada, but similar championships are held in Southern Ontario (Sutherland Cup), Ottawa District (Barkley Cup), Quebec (Coupe Dodge), and Atlantic Canada (Don Johnson Memorial Cup)—leaving five teams at the end of each year with a shared claim to being the best Junior B team in Canada.

== History ==
The Keystone Cup was donated to the Canadian Amateur Hockey Association by Keystone Sports from Selkirk, Manitoba. The inaugural tournament took place in 1983 in Portage la Prairie, Manitoba, and was won by the Selkirk Fishermen of the Manitoba Junior B Hockey League.

The championship is determined through a round-robin of the winner of the Cyclone Taylor Cup in British Columbia, the winner of the Russ Barnes Trophy in Alberta, the winner of the Athol Murray Trophy in Saskatchewan, the Keystone Junior Hockey League, and the William Ryan Trophy in Northwestern Ontario. In previous years, the winner of the Keystone Junior B League would have had to go through the Manitoba Provincial Junior B Hockey Championship, but in 2004 their only competition, the Northwest Junior Hockey League, folded. The same thing happened in the William Ryan Trophy Championship for the Thunder Bay Junior B League, as their only competition, the North of Superior Junior B Hockey League, folded in 2004.

For the 2018 edition of the tournament in Thunder Bay, Ontario, teams from British Columbia and Alberta pulled out of the event. NEAJBHL President Ned Graling cited economic concerns while Kamloops Storm general manager Barry Dewar made claims about playing conditions and accommodations in Manitoba and Northwestern Ontario. The Prairie Junior Hockey League followed British Columbia and Alberta and also withdrew from the 2018 Keystone Cup bringing it to a cross-border clash between the Keystone Junior Hockey League and the Lakehead Junior Hockey League, won by the host Northern Hawks. In mid-November 2019 the teams of the Prairie Junior Hockey League of Saskatchewan decided to send their provincial champion as their representative to the 2020 Keystone Cup. However, the 2020 competition was cancelled as part of the effort to minimize the COVID-19 pandemic.

== Central Canada Cup 2024 ==
In Flin Flon, Manitoba – PBCN Selects host team

Round Robin
| Team | League | W-L-T | GF | GA |
| St. Paul Canadiens | NEAJHL | 4-0-0 | 25 | 10 |
| Current River Storm | LJHL | 2-1-1 | 23 | 15 |
| Saskatoon Royals | PJHL | 2-1-1 | 22 | 21 |
| PBCN Selects | Host | 1-3-0 | 8 | 22 |
| Peguis Juniors | KJHL | 0-4-0 | 11 | 21 |

=== Round Robin ===
Round Robin
| Game | Away | Score | Home | Score |
April 17, 2024
| 1 | Peguis | 2 | St. Paul | 5 |
| 2 | Saskatoon | 6 | Current River | 6 |
| 3 | PBCN | 4 | Peguis | 2 |
April 18, 2024
| 4 | PBCN | 2 | Saskatoon | 5 |
| 5 | Current River | 3 | St. Paul | 6 |
| 6 | Peguis | 5 | Saskatoon | 6 |
| 7 | St. Paul | 7 | PBCN | 0 |
| 8 | Current River | 8 | Peguis | 1 |

=== Championship Round ===
Championship Round
| Game | Away | Score | Home | Score |
| Championship | Saskatoon | 1 | St. Paul | 3 |

== 2024 Roll of Representatives ==
- KJHL (Man) — host PBCN Selects
- KJHL (Man) — KJHL playoff champion Peguis Juniors
- PJHL (Sask) — regular season champion Saskatoon Royals
- LJHL (Ont) — playoff champion Current River Storm
- NEAJHL (Alta) — regular season champion St. Paul Canadiens

== Champions ==
Keystone Cup Champions
| Year | Champions | Runners-Up | Consolation Champions | Host City |
|---|---|---|---|---|
Pre-Keystone Cup Era
| 1978 | Quesnel Millionaires | Saskatoon Quakers | -- |
| 1979 |
| 1980 | Transcona Railers | Selkirk Fishermen | Notre Dame Hounds | Winnipeg, MB |
| 1981 | Transcona Railers | Northwest Americans | Hudson Bay Saints | Winnipeg, MB |
| 1982 | Saskatoon Quakers | Hudson Bay Saints | Transcona Railers | Hudson Bay, SK |
Keystone Cup Era
| 1983 | Selkirk Fishermen | Saskatoon Wesleys | Thunder Bay Hornets | Portage la Prairie, MB |
| 1984 | Portage la Prairie Terriers | Selkirk Fishermen | Thunder Bay Hornets | Schreiber, ON |
| 1985 | Vermilion Tigers | North Winnipeg Satelites | Nipawin Hawks | Nipawin, SK |
| 1986 | Vermilion Tigers | Prince Albert North Stars | North Winnipeg Satelites | Winnipeg, MB |
| 1987 | Calgary Bruins | Vermilion Tigers | | Vermilion, AB |
| 1988 | Warman Valley Crusaders | Columbia Valley Rockies | North Winnipeg Satelites | Saskatoon, SK |
| 1989 | Columbia Valley Rockies | Kinistino Tigers | Stony Plain Flyers | Gimli, MB |
| 1990 | Columbia Valley Rockies | Calgary Bruins | Kinistino Tigers | Invermere, BC |
| 1991 | Kinistino Tigers | Lloydminster Bandits | Stony Plain Flyers | Stony Plain, AB |
| 1992 | Kinistino Tigers | Saskatoon Chiefs | Selkirk Fishermen | Kinistino, SK |
| 1993 | Lloydminster Bandits | Kinistino Tigers | Selkirk Fishermen | Selkirk, MB |
| 1994 | Kinistino Tigers | Selkirk Fishermen | Fort William Hurricanes | Thunder Bay, ON |
| 1995 | Lloydminster Bandits | Regina Capitals | Fort William Hurricanes | Lloydminster, SK |
| 1996 | Assiniboia Southern Rebels | St. Albert Merchants | Ridge Meadows Flames | Sicamous, BC |
| 1997 | Grenfell Storm | St. Malo Warriors | Saskatoon Royals | Grenfell, SK |
| 1998 | Ridge Meadows Flames | Lloydminster Bandits | Hearst Elans | Winnipeg, MB |
| 1999 | Fort William Hurricanes | Edmonton Royals | Campbell River Storm | Thunder Bay, ON |
| 2000 | Edmonton River Kings | Airdrie Thunder | Abbotsford Pilots | Airdrie, AB |
| 2001 | Assiniboia Southern Rebels | Ridge Meadows Flames | Beaver Valley Nitehawks | Maple Ridge, BC |
| 2002 | Sicamous Eagles | Spruce Grove Regals | Assiniboia Southern Rebels | Assiniboia, SK |
| 2003 | Assiniboia Southern Rebels | Spruce Grove Regals | Richmond Sockeyes | Portage la Prairie, MB |
| 2004 | Regina Capitals | Richmond Sockeyes | Red Deer Vipers | Schreiber, ON |
| 2005 | Osoyoos Storm | Saskatoon Royals | Medicine Hat Cubs | Medicine Hat, AB |
| 2006 | Red Deer Vipers | Campbell River Storm | Delta Ice Hawks | Campbell River, BC |
| 2007 | Saskatoon Royals | Fort Qu'Appelle Fort Knox | Winnipeg Saints | Fort Qu'Appelle, SK |
| 2008 | Sherwood Park Knights | Norway House North Stars | Grandview Steelers | Selkirk, MB |
| 2009 | Richmond Sockeyes | Thunder Bay Wolverines | Saskatoon Royals | Thunder Bay, ON |
| 2010 | Revelstoke Grizzlies | Tri-Town Thunder | Kamloops Storm | Kamloops, BC |
| 2011 | Blackfalds Wranglers | Sherwood Park Knights | Pilot Butte Storm | Sherwood Park, AB |
| 2012 | Abbotsford Pilots | Thunder Bay Northern Hawks | Whitecourt Wolverines | Saskatoon, SK |
| 2013 | Richmond Sockeyes | Saskatoon Royals | Okotoks Bisons | St. Malo, MB |
| 2014 | Beaver Valley Nitehawks | Abbotsford Pilots | Blackfalds Wranglers | Abbotsford, BC |
| 2015 | Campbell River Storm | North Edmonton Red Wings | Saskatoon Quakers | Cold Lake, AB |
| 2016 | 100 Mile House Wranglers | Saskatoon Quakers | North Peace Navigators | Regina, SK |
| 2017 | Wainwright Bisons | Beaver Valley Nitehawks | Regina Capitals | Arborg, MB |
| 2018 | Thunder Bay Northern Hawks | Peguis Juniors | Thunder Bay Fighting Walleye | Thunder Bay, ON |
| 2019 | Thunder Bay Northern Hawks | Thunder Bay Fighting Walleye | Cross Lake Islanders | Peguis, MB |
| 2020 | Cancelled due to COVID-19 pandemic in Canada | | | Thunder Bay, ON |
| 2021 | Cancelled due to COVID-19 pandemic in Canada |
| 2022 | Competition not scheduled | | | - |
Central Canada Cup Era
| Year | Champions | Runner-up | Championship result | Host City |
| 2023 | OCN Storm | Schrieber Falcons | 6-3 | Thunder Bay, ON |
| 2024 | St. Paul Canadiens | Saskatoon Royals | 3-1 | Flin Flon, MB |

== Most Top 3 Finishes by Province (since 1999) ==
Keystone Cup medal count by Province
| Region | Gold | Silver | Bronze | Total |
| British Columbia | 9 | 5 | 7 | 21 |
| Alberta | 5 | 6 | 6 | 17 |
| Saskatchewan | 4 | 5 | 5 | 14 |
| Ontario | 3 | 3 | 1 | 7 |
| Manitoba | 0 | 3 | 2 | 5 |
