= Baldy Northcott Trophy =

Canadian Provincial Junior Ice Hockey Trophy

The Baldy Northcott Trophy or Manitoba Provincial Junior B Hockey Championship is a Canadian ice hockey series to determine the Manitoba representative at the Keystone Cup - the Western Canada Junior "B" hockey championship.

== History ==
First awarded by Hockey Manitoba in 1940, the Baldy Northcott Trophy is named after the former professional player Baldy Northcott. He coached the Winnipeg Rangers for one season capturing the 1941 Memorial Cup. Northcott is a member of the Manitoba Hockey Hall of Fame. The trophy is given to the winners of the Junior B championship in Manitoba, Canada.

Several Junior B leagues have participated in the provincial championship over the years. NorMan Junior Hockey League champion Flin Flon Bombers defeated Manitoba Junior B Hockey League winner Trainscona Railers in four games in the 1978 series.

Eastman Junior B Hockey League champion Mitchell Mohawks represented their league in 1986 losing to the North Winnipeg Satelites in two-straight games. From 1999 to 2004 the trophy was contested between the MJBHL and Northwest Junior Hockey League.

Since 2005, the champion of the Keystone Junior Hockey League has stood uncontested as Provincial titlist as the NJHL dissolved in 2004.

== Champions ==
Baldy Northcott Finals
Year	Winner	Runner-up	Result
1978	Flin Flon Bombers (NorMan)	Transcona Railers	3-1
1979	Transcona Railers	Steinbach Millers	4-2*
1980	Transcona Railers (MJBHL)	Brandon Junior B's	3-0
1981	Brandon Junior B's	Transcona Railers (MJBHL)	3-2
1982	Transcona Railers	Selkirk Fishermen	4-0*
1983	Selkirk Fishermen		4-1*
1984	Selkirk Fishermen	Portage Terriers	4-0*
1985	North Winnipeg Satelites	Portage Terriers	4-0*
1986	North Winnipeg Satelites (MJBHL)	Mitchell Mohawks (EJBHL)	2-0
1987	Oak Bluff Raiders	North Winnipeg Satelites	4-1*
1988	North Winnipeg Satelites	Selkirk Fishermen	4-3*
1989	North Winnipeg Satelites	Oak Bluff Raiders	4-1*
1990	Beausejour Comets	North Winnipeg Satelites	4-3*
1991	Selkirk Fishermen	Gimli Vikings	4-0*
1992	Selkirk Fishermen	Ste. Anne Aces	4-1*
1993	Selkirk Fishermen	Ste. Anne Aces	4-1*
1994	Selkirk Fishermen	Brandon Stingers	4-1*
1995	St. Malo Warriors	Selkirk Fishermen	4-1*
1996	Peguis Juniors	St. Malo Warriors	4-2*
1997	St. Malo Warriors	Peguis Juniors	4-1*
1998	Peguis Juniors	Stonewall Jets	4-0*
1999	Selkirk Fishermen (MJBHL)	Pine Creek Warriors (NJHL)	2-0
2000	St. Malo Warriors (MJBHL)	Norway House North Stars (NJHL)	2-0
2001	St. Malo Warriors (MJBHL)	Norway House North Stars (NJHL)	3-0
2002	NCN Flames (NJHL)	North Winnipeg Satelites (MJBHL)	3-0
2003	Selkirk Fishermen (MJBHL)	NCN Flames (NJHL)	6-5
2004	Norway House North Stars (NJHL)	North Winnipeg Satelites (MJBHL)	6-2

Note: Most Baldy Norcott Finals were a best-of three series. The 2003 and 2004 tournaments were a one-game final.

* = MJBHL Carillon Cup Finals winner was awarded the Baldy Norcott Trophy.

== See also ==
- Hockey Manitoba
- Keystone Junior Hockey League
- Northwest Junior Hockey League
