= Thunder Bay Northern Hawks =

- City: Thunder Bay, Ontario, Canada
- League: Lakehead Junior Hockey League
- Founded: 1999
- Home arena: Fort William Gardens
- Colors: Black, Green, and White
- Owners: Scott and Kris Kellaway
- Head coach: Frank Filice

The Thunder Bay Northern Hawks are a Canadian Junior ice hockey team based in Thunder Bay, Ontario. They play in the Lakehead Junior Hockey League, formerly the Thunder Bay Junior B Hockey League.

The Northern Hawks are 12-time Thunder Bay Junior B and Northern Ontario Junior B champions. Thunder Bay are the 2018 Keystone Cup Western Canadian Junior B champions and were runners-up in 2012.

== History ==
The Northern Hawks joined the Thunder Bay Junior B/Juvenile/AAA League in the fall of 1999 playing out of Norwest Arena. The team lost in the Juvenile AAA final to the Thunder Bay Wolves that first season. The 2000-01 season saw the Northern Hawks win the Juvenile AAA Championship and move onto the Ontario Hockey Federation Juvenile AAA championship in Newmarket, Ontario. The Northern Hawks would capture a silver medal at the OHF event, one of Thunder Bay's strongest showings ever.

With the creation of the Superior International Junior Hockey League (SIJHL), the Northern Hawks moved up to Junior B for the 2001-02 season. The Northern Hawks were Brewers Cup champions in 2003. They won the Junior C tournament in 2003 against comparable teams from across Western Canada, defeating the Airdrie Thunder for the gold medal.

In 2004 the Hawks won their first Thunder Bay Junior B Hockey League championship and would capture the William Ryan Trophy (Northern Ontario Regional Junior B Hockey Championship) to advance to the Keystone Cup.

=== 2003-04 ===
The Thunder Bay Northern Hawks finished off the 2003-04 season with one of the best records in Thunder Bay junior hockey history, finishing an undefeated season at 22-0-2. They went on to win the 2004 playoff championship as well defeating the Wawa Travellers of the North of Superior Junior B Hockey League to win the Northern Ontario Regional Junior B Hockey Championship and earn the right to compete for the Keystone Cup.

The 2004 Keystone Cup was hosted by the Aguasabon River Rats of the North of Superior League and Schreiber, Ontario. In the first game, the Northern Hawks throttled Aguasabon 9-3. In the second game, the Hawks tied the Regina Capitals 4-4. Next, the Hawks lost to the Norway House North Stars 6-4, but returned the next game with a 3-1 win over the Red Deer Vipers. The fifth game of the round robin for the Northern Hawks was against the Richmond Sockeyes. Needing a victory to play for the gold medal, the game resulted in a tie. The Northern Hawks faced Red Deer again in their tournament finale, this time for the tournament's bronze medal. The Thunder Bay Northern Hawks lost the game 7-5. From this loss to the end of the 2008 Keystone Cup, no TBJBHL team won a game at the Keystone Cup tournament.

=== 2004-05 ===
The Northern Hawks finished second overall in the 2004-05 season to the Aguasabon River Rats. The River Rats defected from the folding North of Superior League. In the league semifinal, the Northern Hawks defeated the Nipigon Elks 3-games-to-1. This set up a final between the Hawks and River Rats. The Northern Hawks defeated the River Rats 4-games-to-1 to win the league championship. With no other leagues in the region, the Northern Hawks were crowned Northern Ontario Jr. B champions and went on to the 2005 Keystone Cup in Medicine Hat, Alberta.

At the tournament, the first game for the Northern Hawks was a 4-1 loss to the Selkirk Fishermen. Next, the Hawks lost 8-5 to the Medicine Hat Cubs. In the third game, the Hawks were defeated by the Osoyoos Storm 6-2. After that, the Northern Hawks lost to both the Calgary Stampeders and the Saskatoon Royals to close out their tournament winless.

=== 2008-09 ===
The Northern Hawks finished the 2008-09 season in second place in the Thunder Bay Junior B league. With a 14-15-1 record, the Northern Hawks had to begin the 2009 playoffs with a semifinal series against the Nip-Rock Elks, sweeping the series in three games. In the league final, the Northern Hawks were swept in four-straight games by the K&A Wolverines. Because the Wolverines were hosting the Keystone Cup in 2009, the Northern Hawks earned a spot as the Hockey Northwestern Ontario branch representative.

At the Keystone Cup, the Hawks faced the Wolverines in the opening game, losing 6-1. Later that night, the Northern Hawks lost 5-2 to the Prairie Junior Hockey League's Saskatoon Royals. The next day, the Northern Hawks lost to the Keystone Junior Hockey League's St. Malo Warriors 6-2. On the third day, the Northern Hawks lost 6-1 to the North Eastern Alberta Junior B Hockey League's Lloydminster Bandits, which eliminated them from medal contention. In the final round robin game, the Hawks lost 4-2 to the Pacific International Junior Hockey League's Richmond Sockeyes, who would eventually win the Keystone Cup in double overtime over the K&A Wolverines.

=== 2011-12 ===
The Northern Hawks finished first in the league with a 30-2-0 record. They blasted the Schreiber Falcons 3-games-to-none in a lopsided semifinal and then defeated the Nipigon Elks 4-games-to-1 to win the Thunder Bay championship in a hard-fought series. The Northern Hawks shipped out to Saskatoon, Saskatchewan for the 2012 Keystone Cup. Despite leading 3-1 at one point, the Northern Hawks lost their first game to the Abbotsford Pilots of the Pacific International Junior Hockey League 7-4. The Northern Hawks then went on a tear, defeating the host Saskatoon Royals 6-3, Keystone Junior Hockey League's Arborg Ice Dawgs 7-5, North West Junior Hockey League's Whitecourt Wolverines 7-4, and the Prairie Junior Hockey League's Pilot Butte Storm 3-1 to earn a berth into the gold medal game with a 4-1-0 record. After four hard-fought victories, the Northern Hawks fell to the Pilots in the gold medal game 9-1. The Northern Hawks' silver medal is the league's second in four seasons after failing to medal from 2000 until the Wolverines won silver in 2009.

=== 2013-14 ===
The Northern Hawks finished first in the league again with only one regular season loss and one playoff loss. They took out the Schreiber Falcons 4-games-to-none in the semifinals. They then went on to demolish the Stars in the finals, 4-games-to-1, earning a berth into the Keystone Cup in Abbotsford BC. Opening the tournament with a win over Manitoba branch champion, Selkirk Fishermen 2-1, the Hawks next defeated the Saskatoon Quakers 4-3. The Hawks would fall to the Abbotsford Pilots, Beaver Valley Nite Hawks, and Blackfalds Wranglers in the round robin. Finishing fourth the Hawks earned a spot into the bronze medal game, where they came up short and lost 4-3, ending the tournament in 4th place.

=== 2014-15 ===
Winning their sixth-straight TBJBHL championship with a record of 28-1-1, the Northern Hawks swept the Schreiber Falcons and Thunder Bay North Stars in four games each series. At the Keystone Cup, Thunder Bay would go 2-2-1 in round robin play to earn their spot in the Bronze Medal Game. In a goal-filled game the Northern Hawks would fall to the Saskatoon Quakers 5-4 to finish in fourth place at the Western Canada Junior B championship.

== Season-by-season standings ==
Season	GP	W	L	T	OTL	Pts	GF	GA	Results	Playoffs
2000-01	30	9	16	5	-	23	-	-	4th, TBJBHL	
2001-02	22	2	19	1	-	5	-	-	3rd, TBJBHL	
2002-03	24	10	10	4	-	24	-	-	3rd, TBJBHL	
2003-04	24	22	0	2	-	46	196	52	1st, TBJBHL	Won TBJBHL Finals, 4-0 (Maroons) 4th at Keystone Cup
2004-05	24	13	7	4	-	30	126	83	2nd, TBJBHL	Won TBJBHL Finals, 3-1 (River Rats) 6th at Keystone Cup
2005-06	30	14	13	3	-	31	178	130	3rd, TBJBHL	Lost finals, 3-4 (Wolverines)
2006-07	30	20	4	6	-	46	212	101	2nd, TBJBHL	Lost finals, 3-4 (Wolverines)
2007-08	30	20	6	4	-	44	197	98	2nd, TBJBHL	Lost finals, 2-4 (Wolverines)
2008-09	30	14	15	1	-	29	120	115	2nd, TBJBHL	Lost finals, 0-4 (Wolverines) 6th at Keystone Cup
2009-10	30	27	3	0	-	54	222	81	1st, TBJBHL	Won TBJBHL Finals; 4-0 (Stars) 6th at Keystone Cup
2010-11	30	25	3	2	-	52	196	81	1st, TBJBHL	Won TBJBHL Finals; 4-0 (Stars) 6th at Keystone Cup
2011-12	32	30	2	0	-	60	258	65	1st, TBJBHL	Won TBJBHL Finals; 4-1 (Elks) Silver at Keystone Cup
2012-13	32	27	4	1	-	55	270	65	1st, TBJBHL	Won TBJBHL Finals, 4-0 (Elks) 5th at Keystone Cup
2013-14	30	27	1	2	-	56	186	31	1st, TBJBHL	Won TBJBHL Finals, 4-1 (Stars) 4th at Keystone Cup
2014-15	30	28	1	1	-	57	189	51	1st, TBJBHL	Won semifinals, 4-0 (Falcons); Won TBJBHL Finals, 4-0 (Stars); 4th at Keystone Cup
2015-16	30	21	6	2	-	44	159	77	2nd, TBJBHL	Won semifinals, 4-1 (Elks); Won TBJBHL Finals 4-2 (Stars); 6th at Keystone Cup
2016-17	30	17	8	5	-	39	178	105	2nd, LJHL	Won semifinals, 4-0 (Falcons); Lost LJHL Finals 1-4 (Elks)
2017-18	28	14	7	7	-	35	218	116	2nd, LJHL	Won semifinals, 4-3 (Elks); Won LJHL Finals 4-1 (Fighting Walleye) Won Keystone Cup
2018-19	30	23	6	1	-	47	218	90	1st of 4	Won semifinals, 4-0 (Falcons); Won LJHL Finals 4-1 (Fighting Walleye); Won Keystone Cup
2019-20	27	19	5	1	2	41	453	91	1st of 4	Playoffs cancelled due to COVID-19
2020-21	Season cancelled due to COVID-19									
2021-22	18	6	7	1	4	17	66	65	3rd of 4	Won semifinals, 4-1 (Falcons); Lost LJHL Finals, 1-4 (Bandits)
2022-23	24	15	7	0	2	32	115	76	2nd of 5	Won semifinals, 4-3 (Storm); Won LJHL Finals, 4-2 (Falcons); Advance to Central Canada Cup as host
2023-24	24	14	9	0	1	29	111	101	3rd of 5	Won semifinals, 4-2 (Falcons); Lost LJHL Finals 0-4 (Storm)
2024-25	22	15	7	0	0	30	101	84	2nd of 5	Lost semifinals, 0-3 (Falcons)
2025-26	24	17	7	0	0	34	135	101	2nd of 5	Won semifinals, 3-2 (Bandits); Lost League Finals 0-3 (Storm)

== Western Canadian Jr. B Championships ==
(Northern Ontario to British Columbia)
After 2017 only (Northern Ontario and Manitoba)

Year	Round Robin	Record	Standing	Semifinal	Medal Game
KEYSTONE CUP
2014	W, Selkirk 2-1; L, Abbotsford 1-5; W, Saskatoon 4-3; L, Blackfalds 4-8; L, Beaver Valley 0-4	2-3-0	4th of 6		
2015	T, Selkirk 3-3; W, Cold Lake 3-1; L, Saskatoon 3-4; L, Campbell Rvr 2-5; W, N Edmonton 5-1	2-2-1	4th of 6		
2016	W, 100 Mi Hse 3-0; L, North Peace 2-4; L, Regina 1-4; L, Saskatoon 0-14; L, Peguis 4-8	1-5-0	6th of 6		
2018^{(A)}	W, St. Malo Warriors 7-1; W, Peguis Juniors 6-5; W, Thunder Bay Fighting Walleye 9-3	3-0-0	1st of 4	none	W, Peguis Juniors 5-2; Keystone Cup champions
2019^{(A)}	W, Cross Lake Islanders 13-4; W, Peguis Juniors 3-2; W, Thunder Bay Fighting Walleye 4-3	3-0-0	1st of 4	W, Cross Lake Islanders 7-0	W, Thunder Bay Fighting Walleye 4-2; Keystone Cup champions
CENTRAL CANADA CUP
Year	Round Robin	Record	Standing	Semifinal	Medal Game
2023; Host	L, Shreiber Falcons 4-5; W, OCN Storm 3-1; L, Peguis Juniors 0-15	1-2-0	3rd of 4	L, Shreiber Falcons 1-3	

- ^{(A)}BC, Alta, & Sask did not send teams to Keystone Cup. Playoff: 2nd vs 3rd; loser bronze medalist, winner vs 1st for gold.
