= North Winnipeg Satelites =

- City: Winnipeg, Manitoba
- League: Capital Region Junior Hockey League
- Founded: 1980
- Home arena: Billy Mosienko Arena
- Colours: Black, white, yellow
- General manager: Don Gibson
- Head coach: Murry Monkman

Championships
- Playoff championships: 8 (1983, 1985, 1986, 1988, 1989, 2002, 2003, 2006)

The North Winnipeg Satelites are a junior "B" ice hockey team based in Winnipeg, Manitoba. They are members of the Capital Region Junior Hockey League (CRJHL).

== History ==
Founded in 1980, the North Winnipeg Satelites found much success early on winning the league title five times (1983, 1985, 1986, 1988, 1989) in the 80s. The Satelites went on to capture the Baldy Northcott Trophy four of five times. They would repeat the feat again in 2006. They would finish second in 1985 at the Keystone Cup hosted in Nipawin,Sask, and third in Winnipeg in 1986, and Saskatoon in 1988.

The team was a member of the Keystone Junior Hockey League until 2018. For the 2018–19 season the Satellites were one of five teams that departed the Keystone Junior Hockey League to establish the Capital Region Junior Hockey League.

== Season-by-season record ==
Note: GP = Games played, W = Wins, L = Losses, T = Ties, OTL = Overtime Losses, Pts = Points, GF = Goals for, GA = Goals against

Season	GP	W	L	T	OTL	Pts	GF	GA	Finish	Playoffs
1981–82	27	12	15	0	---	24	174	186	5th of 9	Lost quarterfinals 2–1 vs St. Claude Knights
1982–83									1st of 8	Won semifinals vs St. Claude Knights; Won finals 4–1 vs Selkirk Fishermen
1983–84									5th of 7	DNQ
1984–85	30	16	14	0	---	32	240	197	4th of 8	Won semifinals 3–2 vs Selkirk Fishermen; Won finals 4–0 vs Portage Terriers
1985–86	24	18	6	0	---	36	196	120	1st of 6	Won semifinals 4–0 vs Beausejour Comets; Won finals vs Portage Terriers
1986–87	28	21	6	1	---	43	208	130	1st of 10	Won semifinals 3–1 vs North Interlake United; Lost finals 1–4 vs Oak Bluff Raiders
1987–88	35	29	6	0	---	58	275	116	1st of 8	Won semifinals 3–0 vs Oak Bluff Raiders; Won finals 4–3 vs Selkirk Fishermen
1988-89	35	32	3	0	---	64	366	153	1st of 8	Won semifinals 3–1 vs Gimli Vikings; Won finals 4–1 vs Oak Bluff Raiders
1989–90	28	19	9	0	---	38	212	123	3rd of 10	Won quarterfinals vs St. Boniface Saints Won semifinals 4–1 vs Selkirk Fishermen Lost finals 3–4 vs Beausejour Comets
1990–91	35	22	13	0	---	44	262	209	2nd of 8	Lost semifinals 2–4 vs Gimli Vikings
1991–92	36	18	16	2	---	38	202	178	5th of 10	Lost quarterfinals 1–3 vs Red River Rockets
1992–93	32	12	17	1	2	27	164	201	6th of 9	Won quarterfinals vs Beausejour Comets Lost semifinals 0–3 vs Selkirk Fishermen
1993–94						29			4th of 5, East 5th of 9, MJBHL	Lost quarterfinals vs Selkirk Fishermen
1994–95	34	10	19	1	4	25	158	229	8th of 10	Lost quarterfinals 0–3 vs Brandon Stingers
1995–96	32	11	20	0	1	23	155	197	7th of 8	Lost quarterfinals vs Peguis Juniors
1996–97	32	10	19	1	2	23	170	198	6th of 8	Won quarterfinals 3–0 vs Brandon Stingers Lost semifinals 0–4 vs St. Malo Warriors
1997–98	32	13	14	1	4	31	154	173	5th of 8	Lost quarterfinals vs St. Malo Warriors
1998–99	32	19	7	2	4	44	194	146	3rd of 9	Won quarterfinals 3–1 vs Carman Knights Lost semifinals 2–3 vs Stonewall Jets
1999–00	32	17	13	0	2	36	159	148	5th of 9	Won quarterfinals 3–1 vs Selkirk Fishermen Lost semifinals 2–4 vs St. Malo Warriors
2000–01	36	7	24	1	4	19	134	224	7th of 7	Lost quarterfinals vs St. Malo Warriors
2001–02	36	19	14	1	2	41	191	143	4th of 7	Won quarterfinals 3–1 vs St. Malo Warriors; Won semifinals 4–3 vs St. Claude Knights; Won finals 4–0 vs Selkirk Fishermen
2002–03	32	22	8	1	1	46	201	105	3rd of 8	Won quarterfinals 3–0 vs Sagkeeng Hawks; Won semifinals 4–3 vs St. Claude Knights; Won finals 4–1 vs Selkirk Fishermen
2003–04	34	21	13	0	0	42	136	120	2nd of 6	Won semifinals 4–1 vs Peguis Juniors Lost finals 0–4 vs Selkirk Fishermen
2004–05	36	14	22	0	0	28	119	121	6th of 7	Lost quarterfinals 0–2 vs Norway House North Stars
2005–06	36	20	12	1	3	44	—	—	2nd of 7	Won quarterfinals 3–0 vs St. Malo Warriors; Won semifinals 4–1 vs Peguis Juniors; Won finals 4–2 vs Selkirk Fishermen
2006–07	40	22	12	0	6	50	191	154	3rd of 9	Won quarterfinals 4–2 vs Arborg Ice Dawgs; Lost semifinals 3–4 vs Selkirk Fishermen
2007–08	40	20	18	0	2	42	171	158	6th of 9	Won quarterfinals 3–1 vs Selkirk Fishermen; Lost semifinals 0–4 vs St. Malo Warriors
2008–09	36	26	8	0	2	54	201	127	2nd of 8	Won quarterfinals 3–0 vs Cross Lake Islanders; Lost semifinals 0–3 vs Selkirk Fishermen
2009–10	32	17	10	0	5	39	153	114	5th of 8	Won quarterfinals 3–1 vs St. Malo Warriors; Lost semifinals 2–4 vs Selkirk Fishermen
2010–11	32	23	7	0	2	48	153	90	2nd of 8	Won quarterfinals 3–0 vs Lundar Falcons; Lost semifinals 3–4 vs Arborg Ice Dawgs
2011–12	36	19	15	0	2	40	133	142	4th of 7	Won quarterfinals 3–1 vs Peguis Juniors; Lost semifinals 1–4 vs Arborg Ice Dawgs
2012–13	36	16	18	0	2	34	140	156	6th of 9	Lost first round 0–3 vs Selkirk Fishermen
2013–14	34	20	12	1	1	42	161	111	2nd, South 4th of 8, KJHL	Won division semifinals 3–1 vs St. Malo Warriors; Lost division finals 2–4 vs Selkirk Fishermen
2014–15	32	20	11	0	1	41	180	131	4th of 9	Lost quarterfinals 1–3 vs OCN Storm
2015–16	34	11	22	0	1	23	120	165	5th of 5, South; 8th of 10, KJHL	Lost Survivor Series 1–2 vs Arborg Ice Dawgs
2016–17	34	15	18	0	1	31	149	164	3rd of 4, South; 7th of 10, KJHL	Lost quarterfinals 0–3 vs Arborg Ice Dawgs
2017–18	34	15	17	0	2	32	137	152	4th of 4, South; 7th of 10, KJHL	Lost quarterfinals 0–3 vs Peguis Juniors

Capital Region Junior Hockey League
Season	GP	W	L	T	OTW	OTL	Pts	GF	Finish	Playoffs
2018–19	32	13	14	0	2	3	46	113	3rd of 5	Won semifinals 4–2 vs Arborg Ice Dawgs; Lost finals 2–4 vs Selkirk Fishermen
2019–20	32	2	28	0	1	1	9	57	5th of 5	Lost Survivor Series 0–2 vs Arborg Ice Dogs
2020–21	7	1	6	0	0	0	3	14	5th of 5	League play suspended in November due to COVID-19
2021–22	32	9	21	0	1	1	30	71	4th of 5	Lost Survivor Series 0–2 vs (Lundar Falcons)
2022–23	30	4	25	0	0	1	13	71	4th of 6	Lost Survivor Series 1-3 vs (Arborg Ice Dawgs)
2023–24	30	7	19	0	1	3	26	85	6th of 6	Lost Quarterfinals 2-3 vs (Lundar Falcons)
2024–25	30	3	26	0	1	0	80	175	7th of 7	Lost Quarterfinals 0-3 vs (Beausejour Comets)
2025–26	30	3	24	0	1	2	13	109	7th of 7	Lost Quarterfinals 0-3 vs (Beausejour Comets)

== Keystone Cup ==
Western Canadian Jr. B Championships (Northern Ontario to British Columbia)
Six teams in round-robin play. 1st vs. 2nd for gold/silver & 3rd vs. 4th for bronze.

Year	Round-robin	Record	Standing	Bronze medal game	Gold medal game
1988	W, Edmonton Allied Flyers, 8-2; W, Saskatoon Quakers, 6-2; L, Warman Valley Crusaders, 0-7; L, Columbia Valley Rockies, 2-6	2–2–0	3rd	W, Edmonton Allied Flyers, 6-4	—
2006	W, Thunder Bay Wolverines, 6–4; L, Saskatoon Royals, 4–5; L, Campbell River Storm, 1–2; L, Delta Ice Hawks, 3–14; T, Red Deer Vipers, 0–0	1–3–1	5th of 6	—	—
