= Fisher River Hawks =

- City: Fisher River, Manitoba
- League: Keystone Junior Hockey League
- Founded: 2014
- Home arena: Bryden Cocrane Sr. Sports Complex
- Colours: Polar night blue, white, black
- Owner(s): Fisher River Cree Nation

Franchise history
- 2014–2019: Fisher River Hawks

The Fisher River Hawks were a Junior "B" ice hockey team based in Fisher River, Manitoba. They were members of the Keystone Junior Hockey League (KJHL). The franchise was founded in 2014.

== History ==
Fisher River Cree Nation was approved for a Junior B hockey team by the KJHL in April 2014. The community of Fisher River officially named their new franchise hockey team the Fisher River Hawks. The team play all home games at the Bryden Cochrane Sr. Sports Complex.

The Fisher River Hawks played their first regular season game on October 17, 2014, against the Peguis Juniors. The Hawks won their first league game on November 19, 2014, defeating the Lundar Falcons 3–2.

The 2015–16 season was the first playoff appearance for the Hawks, winning their first playoff game 15–10 over the Norway House North Stars. They would lose the next two games and were eliminated.

In October 2018 the Hawks announced they were taking a one-year leave of absence from the league.

== Season-by-season record ==
Note: GP = Games played, W = Wins, L = Losses, T = Ties, OTL = Overtime Losses, Pts = Points, GF = Goals for, GA = Goals against, PCT = Winning Percentage

Season	GP	W	L	T	OTL	Pts	GF	GA	Finish	Playoffs
2014–15	32	2	30	0	0	4	57	287	9th of 9	Did not qualify
2015–16	34	8	25	0	1	17	174	267	4th of 5, North; 9th of 10, KJHL	Lost Survivor Series, 1–2 (North Stars)
2016–17	34	9	24	0	1	19	170	316	3rd of 3, Central; 9th of 10, KJHL	Did not qualify
2017–18	34	4	28	0	1	10	106	286	3rd of 3, Central; 10th of 10, KJHL	Did not qualify

== Franchise records ==
- Most goals in a season: Darryl Thaddeus, 20 (2014–15)
- Most assists in a season: Darryl Thaddeus, 9 (2014–15), Jared Thickfoot, 9 (2014–15)
- Most points in a season: Darryl Thaddeus, 29 (2014–15)
- Most penalty minutes in a season: Brent Courchene, 117 (2014–15)
- Most goals in a season, defenceman: Arnie Mason, 1 (2014–15)
- Most points in a season, defenceman: Arnie Mason, 4 (2014–15)
- Most goals in a season, rookie: Darryl Thaddeus, 20 (2014–15)
- Most assists in a season, rookie: Darryl Thaddeus, 9 (2014–15), Jared Thickfoot, 9 (2014–15)
- Most points in a season, rookie: Darryl Thaddeus, 29 (2014–15)
- Most wins in a season: Ryan Bruyere, 1 (2014–15)
- Most shutouts in a season: N/A
