= NJHL =

NJHL may refer to:

- National Junior Hockey League (Canada), Canada
- National Junior Hockey League, Russia
- Noralta Junior Hockey League, Alberta, Canada
- NorMan Junior Hockey League, Manitoba, Canada
- Northern Junior Hockey League, United States
- North West Junior Hockey League, Alberta/British Columbia, Canada
- Northwest Junior Hockey League (Manitoba), Canada
