= Capital Region Junior Hockey League =

Canadian junior ice hockey league

- Commissioner: Chris Poponick
- Founded: 2018
- No. of teams: 8
- Recent champions: La Broquerie Habs (2026)
- Website: crjhl.com

The Capital Region Junior Hockey League (CRJHL) is a junior B ice hockey league in the province of Manitoba, Canada. The league, sanctioned by Hockey Manitoba, began play for 2018–19 season.

== History ==
The CRJHL was formed in 2018 when five teams from the Keystone Junior Hockey League (KJHL) withdrew to form a new league. These five clubs, all located within an hour-and-a-half drive of Winnipeg, cited the long travel distance to northern Manitoba, where the KJHL's other six teams are located, as the main reason for leaving to create the new league. The split resulted in litigation, with the remaining KJHL teams alleging that the decision to form a new league was racially motivated. The remaining KJHL teams filed a complaint with governing body, Hockey Manitoba, which ruled that the new league had breached the organization's constitution when it did not give proper notice to the KJHL. Moreover, it ruled that former KJHL players would need a release to play in the new league and there would be a $500 fee. The KJHL applied to the Court of Queen's Bench of Manitoba for an injunction halting the CRJHL's inaugural season, and seeking damages for alleged breaches of contracts with players. The court denied the request for injunction, finding that the KJHL teams had not exhausted their appeals through Hockey Manitoba and couldn't prove the split would cause irreparable harm to the league.

The Selkirk Fishermen defeated the North Winnipeg Satelites in six games to capture the first-ever CRJHL championship in 2019. The Fishermen, who defeated the Arborg Ice Dawgs in five games, were set to defend that title in 2020 against the St. Malo Warriors, but the finals were cancelled due to the COVID-19 pandemic.

The 2020–21 CRJHL season began in October 2020 with games played with spectator limits before provincial-wide restrictions forced the cancellation of the remainder of the season.

In 2024, the St. Malo Warriors became the second club to win the league championship.

== Teams ==
The league has expanded thrice since it began with 5 teams in 2018. The Beausejour Comets joined in the 2022–23 CRJHL season, and the La Broquerie Habs debuted in the 2024–25 CRJHL season. The Altona Maroons joined as an expansion franchise in 2026–27.

Franchises
Team	City/Area	Arena	Founded
Altona Maroons	Altona	Millennium Exhibition Centre	2026
Arborg Ice Dawgs	Arborg	Arborg & District Arena	2006
Beausejour Comets	Beausejour	Beausejour Sportsplex	2022
La Broquerie Habs	La Broquerie	HyLife Centre	2024
Lundar Falcons	Lundar	Lundar Arena	2010
North Winnipeg Satelites	Inkster East Neighbourhood	Billy Mosienko Arena	1980
Selkirk Fishermen	Selkirk	Selkirk Recreation Complex	1917
St. Malo Warriors	St. Malo	St. Malo Arena	1993

== League championships ==
CRJHL champions
Year	Playoff winner	Runner-up	Result
2019	Selkirk Fishermen	North Winnipeg Satelites	4-2
2020	Not awarded		
2021	Not awarded		
2022	Selkirk Fishermen	Arborg Ice Dogs	4-0
2023	Selkirk Fishermen	St. Malo Warriors	4-1
2024	St. Malo Warriors	Beausejour Comets	4-2
2025	St. Malo Warriors	Beausejour Comets	4-3
2026	La Broquerie Habs	Selkirk Fishermen	4-1
