= Darren Helm =

Canadian ice hockey player (born 1987)

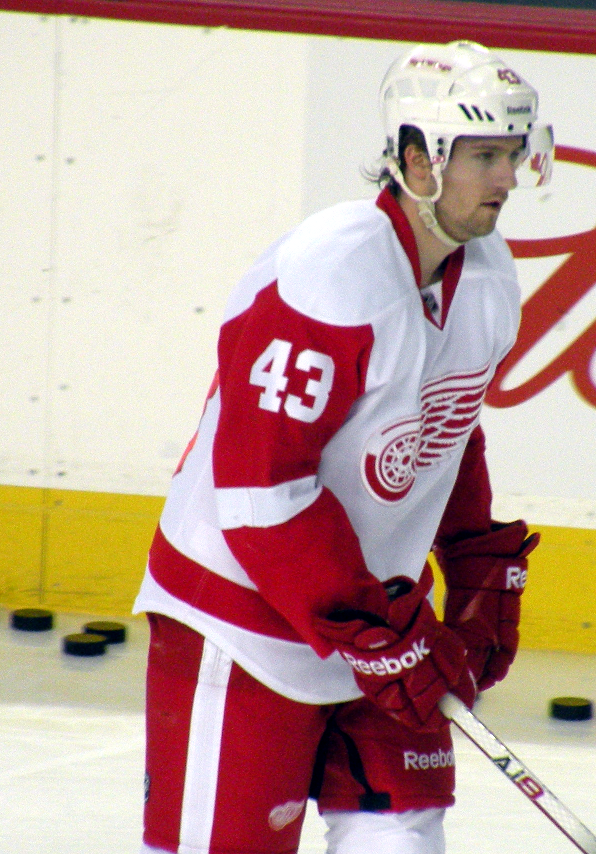
- Helm with the Detroit Red Wings in January 2012
- Born: January 21, 1987 (age 39) St. Andrews, Manitoba, Canada
- Height: 5 ft 11 in (180 cm)
- Weight: 192 lb (87 kg; 13 st 10 lb)
- Position: Centre / Left wing
- Shot: Left
- Played for: Detroit Red Wings; Colorado Avalanche
- NHL draft: 132nd overall, 2005; Detroit Red Wings
- Playing career: 2007–2023

Darren Helm (born January 21, 1987) is a Canadian former professional ice hockey player. He played for the Detroit Red Wings and the Colorado Avalanche, winning the Stanley Cup in 2008 and again in 2022.

== Playing career ==
=== Junior ===
Helm started his junior playing career with the Selkirk Fishermen of the Keystone Junior Hockey League (KJHL). He led the league in scoring for the 2003–04 season with 73 points in 34 games, en route to helping the Fishermen to a league championship. He also appeared in six games for the Selkirk Steelers of the Junior A Manitoba Junior Hockey League (MJHL) that season.

The following season, in 2004–05, Helm went on to play for the Medicine Hat Tigers of the Western Hockey League, beginning a three-year major junior career. Following a 24-point WHL rookie season, which was complemented by two goals and six assists in thirteen playoff games, Helm was drafted by the Detroit Red Wings in the fifth round, 132nd overall, of the 2005 NHL entry draft. His second season in the WHL was much more productive as he led his team in scoring with 79 points in 70 games. He also helped the Tigers win the regular season title with a 47-16-9 record for 103 points. While the Tigers swept the first two rounds of the playoffs that season, they lost the semifinals to the Moose Jaw Warriors. On September 27, 2006, Helm signed a three-year entry-level contract with the Red Wings. Nevertheless, he returned to the Tigers for a third and final WHL season in 2006–07 to help lead the team to an Ed Chynoweth Cup as league champions, defeating the Vancouver Giants in a seven-game final round. Earning a berth in the 2007 Memorial Cup, Helm and the Tigers then finished as runner-up to the Giants, who hosted the tournament.

=== Professional ===
==== Detroit Red Wings (2007–2021) ====
In 2007–08, Helm started his professional playing career and was assigned by the Red Wings to their American Hockey League (AHL) affiliate, the Grand Rapids Griffins. Near the end of the season, he was called up to Detroit and played his first NHL game on March 13, 2008. Helm remained with the Red Wings for their 2008 playoff run, centering the fourth line, and scored his first NHL goal on May 10, 2008, during game two of the Western Conference finals against the Dallas Stars. He contributed 2 goals and 2 assists in 18 playoff games, helping the Red Wings to the franchise's 11th Stanley Cup.

Despite being able to stick with the NHL club for the last part of his professional rookie season, Helm returned to the AHL in 2008–09. After appearing in 16 regular season games for the Red Wings, however, he was called up once again for the first game of the 2009 playoffs. During game seven of the Western Conference semifinal series against the Anaheim Ducks, Helm scored a crucial goal on a breakaway to give the Wings a 2–0 lead. The Wings won the game and advanced to the Western Conference Finals against the Chicago Blackhawks, where he scored the series-winning goal in overtime of game five. With the goal, Helm became the first player in NHL history to score five playoff goals before scoring a regular season goal. He increased his total to six playoff goals before scoring a regular season goal, extending his record.

For the 2009–10 NHL season, Helm was placed as the regular fourth line centre. His speed and determination led Detroit Red Wings coach Mike Babcock to name Helm as "probably our best player from start to finish." He had a notable game on New Year's Eve of 2009, when he scored two short-handed goals in a single outing against the Colorado Avalanche. Following the season, the Red Wings signed Helm to a two-year contract extension worth $1.825 million. The contract has an annual cap hit of $912,500.

Helm has developed a reputation of being one of the league's top defensive players, as well as one of the fastest. During the 2010–11 NHL season Helm stepped into a more consistent scoring role, setting career highs in all statistics. During the 2011 playoffs coach Mike Babcock named Helm "an elite player, probably not a fourth-line player"

On June 19, 2012, Helm signed a four-year, $8.5 million contract extension with the Detroit Red Wings.

During the Red Wings 2012-13 training camp, Helm was diagnosed with a chronic back condition that forced him to miss all but one game in the 2012–13 season and much of the first half of the 2013–14 season.

On March 29, 2014, Helm recorded his first career hat-trick in a game against the Toronto Maple Leafs.

On July 1, 2016, Helm signed a five-year, $19.25 million contract extension with the Red Wings. Helm spent 14 years with the Red Wings, appearing in 744 regular-season games and recording 112 goals and 139 assists. His 744 regular season games with Detroit ranks 17th overall in the history of the franchise. He said he had "mixed emotions" about leaving Detroit, as he had "been here for a long time. I've raised a family here." Helm was also the last remaining member of Detroit's 2008 Stanley Cup Championship team.

==== Colorado Avalanche (2021–2023) ====
On July 29, 2021, the Colorado Avalanche signed Helm to a one-year, $1 million contract for the 2021–22 season. After recording 7 goals and 8 assists through 68 regular season games in a fourth-line role with the Avalanche, the team entered the 2022 Stanley Cup playoffs with the second-best record in the league, but also a recent history of faltering in the second round of the playoffs. After sweeping the Nashville Predators, the Avalanche faced the St. Louis Blues in the second round. In game six of the second round, with the game tied and seemingly heading to overtime, Helm scored a goal with 5.6 seconds left in regulation to send the Avalanche to the Western Conference Final for the first time since 2002. The Avalanche defeated the Edmonton Oilers in the conference finals to advance to the Stanley Cup Final, the third Finals appearance of Helm's career. The Avalanche went on to defeat the two-time defending champion Tampa Bay Lightning in six games, Helm's second Cup win.

On July 13, 2022, Helm was re-signed by the Avalanche to a one-year, $1.25 million contract extension for the 2022–23 season.

On July 5, 2023, Helm retired from playing professional hockey after missing most of the season due to injury.

== International play ==
Medal record

Representing Canada

Ice hockey

World Junior Championships
Gold medal – first place	2007 Canada	

Helm participated in the 2007 World Junior Ice Hockey Championships for Team Canada; playing on the second and third lines, he won a gold medal.

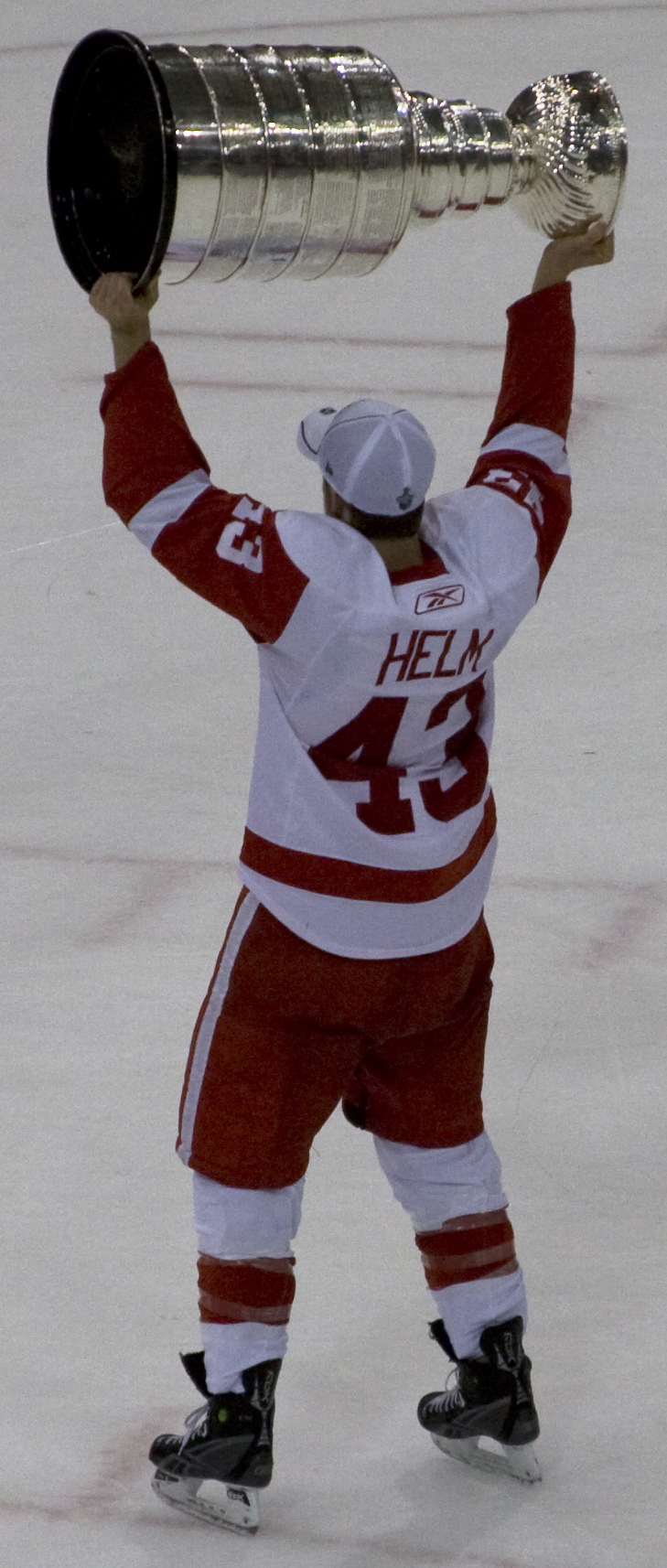
Helm celebrates with the Stanley Cup in June 2008.

== Career statistics ==
=== Regular season and playoffs ===
			Regular season					Playoffs
Season	Team	League	GP	G	A	Pts	PIM	GP	G	A	Pts	PIM
2003–04	Selkirk Fishermen	MJBHL	34	39	32	71	34	—	—	—	—	—
2003–04	Selkirk Steelers	MJHL	6	0	3	3	0	—	—	—	—	—
2004–05	Medicine Hat Tigers	WHL	72	10	14	24	27	13	2	6	8	10
2005–06	Medicine Hat Tigers	WHL	70	41	38	79	37	13	5	4	9	2
2006–07	Medicine Hat Tigers	WHL	59	25	39	64	53	23	10	12	22	14
2007–08	Grand Rapids Griffins	AHL	67	16	15	31	30	—	—	—	—	—
2007–08	Detroit Red Wings	NHL	7	0	0	0	2	18	2	2	4	2
2008–09	Grand Rapids Griffins	AHL	55	13	24	37	24	—	—	—	—	—
2008–09	Detroit Red Wings	NHL	16	0	1	1	4	23	4	1	5	4
2009–10	Detroit Red Wings	NHL	75	11	13	24	18	12	1	0	1	4
2010–11	Detroit Red Wings	NHL	82	12	20	32	16	11	3	3	6	8
2011–12	Detroit Red Wings	NHL	68	9	17	26	12	1	0	0	0	0
2012–13	Detroit Red Wings	NHL	1	0	0	0	2	—	—	—	—	—
2013–14	Grand Rapids Griffins	AHL	2	0	0	0	0	—	—	—	—	—
2013–14	Detroit Red Wings	NHL	42	12	8	20	14	5	0	1	1	0
2014–15	Detroit Red Wings	NHL	75	15	18	33	12	7	0	3	3	4
2015–16	Detroit Red Wings	NHL	77	13	13	26	32	5	1	0	1	6
2016–17	Detroit Red Wings	NHL	50	8	9	17	20	—	—	—	—	—
2017–18	Detroit Red Wings	NHL	75	13	18	31	39	—	—	—	—	—
2018–19	Detroit Red Wings	NHL	61	7	10	17	20	—	—	—	—	—
2019–20	Detroit Red Wings	NHL	68	9	7	16	37	—	—	—	—	—
2020–21	Detroit Red Wings	NHL	47	3	5	8	10	—	—	—	—	—
2021–22	Colorado Avalanche	NHL	68	7	8	15	14	20	2	3	5	12
2022–23	Colorado Avalanche	NHL	11	0	0	0	4	1	0	0	0	0
NHL totals			823	119	147	266	256	103	13	13	26	40

=== International ===
Year	Team	Event	Result	GP	G	A	Pts	PIM
2007	Canada	WJC	1st place, gold medalist(s)	6	2	0	2	10
Junior totals				6	2	0	2	10

== Awards and honours ==
Award	Year
WHL
East First All-Star Team	2006
East Second All-Star Team	2007
CHL Memorial Cup All-Star Team	2007
NHL
Stanley Cup champion	2008, 2022
