= Northwest Junior Hockey League (Manitoba) =

NJHL Emblem

The Northwest Junior Hockey League is a defunct Junior "B" ice hockey league in Manitoba, Canada, sanctioned by Hockey Canada. The league's only provincial rival, the Manitoba Junior B Hockey League, still exists as the Keystone Junior Hockey League.

In the 13-season history of the league NJHL teams would go on to win the Baldy Northcott Trophy three times: Norway House North Stars (2001, 2004) and NCN Flames (2002).

== Teams ==
Logo	Team	Centre
	Cross Lake Islanders	Cross Lake
	NCN Flames	Nelson House
	Norway House North Stars	Norway House
	OCN Storm	The Pas
	Split Lake Warriors	Split Lake
	Tataskweyak Cree Juniors	Tataskweyak

== Champions ==
NJHL Playoff winners
Season	Champion	Runner-up	Result
1992	Norway House North Stars		
1993	Norway House North Stars		
1994	Norway House North Stars		
1995	Cross Lake Islanders		
1996	Norway House North Stars		
1997	Norway House North Stars		
1998	Pine Creek Warriors		
1999	Pine Creek Warriors		
2000	Norway House North Stars		
2001	Norway House North Stars	NCN Flames	4-2
2002	NCN Flames	Norway House North Stars	4-1
2003	NCN Flames	Norway House North Stars	4-0
2004	Norway House North Stars	NCN Flames	4-0
