= Arborg Ice Dawgs =

Junior ice hockey team

- City: Arborg, Manitoba
- League: CRJHL
- Founded: 2006
- Home arena: Arborg & District Arena
- Colours: Navy blue, white, black, yellow
- General manager: Lloyd Barylski
- Head coach: Derric Gulay (2025)

The Arborg Ice Dawgs are a Junior ice hockey team based in Arborg, Manitoba and a member of the Capital Region Junior Hockey League. The team was founded in 2006 and a member of the Keystone Junior Hockey League (KJHL) until 2018.

They have qualified for three Manitoba Provincial Finals, winning two Manitoba Provincial Junior B Hockey Championship in their history in 2010–11 and 2011–12.

For the 2018–19 season the Ice Dawgs were one of five teams that departed the Keystone Junior Hockey League and established the Capital Region Junior Hockey League.

== Season-by-season record ==
Note: GP = Games played, W = Wins, L = Losses, T = Ties, OTL = Overtime Losses, Pts = Points, GF = Goals for, GA = Goals against, PCT = Winning Percentage

Season	GP	W	L	T	OTL	Pts	GF	GA	Pct	Finish	Playoffs
2006–07	40	8	19	2	1	39	188	194	0.487	6th	
2007–08	40	27	12	0	1	55	224	149	0.688	2nd	
2008–09	0	0	0	0	0	0	0	0	0.000		
2009–10	32	21	9	0	2	44	197	124	0.688	2nd	Lost in Manitoba Provincial; 3–4 (Fishermen)
2010–11	32	22	9	0	1	45	193	135	0.703	3rd	Manitoba Provincial Junior B Hockey Championship 4–1 (North Stars)
2011–12	36	26	10	0	0	52	218	149	0.722	1st	Manitoba Provincial Junior B Hockey Championship 4–0 (North Stars)
2012–13	36	27	7	0	2	56	219	117	0.778	2nd	Keystone Junior B Hockey Semifinals; 1–4 (Fishermen)
2013–14	34	21	11	0	2	44	175	115	0.647	2nd North	Lost League Finals, 1–4 (Fishermen)
2015–16	34	17	15	0	2	36	149	131	0.529	4th South	Won Survivor Series, 2–1 (Satelites); Lost Div. Semifinals, 0–3 (Fishermen)
2016–17	32	24	10	0	0	48	206	114	0.705	1st of 3, Central; 2nd of 10, KJHL	Won Quarterfinals, 3–0 (Satelites); Won Semifinals, 4–1 (Storm); Lost League Finals, 2–4 (Juniors)
2017–18	34	19	11	0	4	42	234	107	0.809	2nd of 3, Central; 4th of 10, KJHL	Lost Quarterfinals, 2-3 (Falcons)
2017–18	34	19	11	0	4	42	234	107	0.809	2nd of 3, Central; 4th of 10, KJHL	Lost Quarterfinals, 2-3 (Falcons)

CAPITAL REGION JUNIOR HOCKEY LEAGUE
Season	GP	W	L	T	OTW	OTL	Pts	GF	GA	Pct	Finish	Playoffs
2018–19	32	14	15	1	1	1	46	106	132	0.479	2nd of 5 CRJHL	Lost Semifinals, 2-4 (Satelites)
2019–20	32	11	18	0	1	2	37	108	145	0.385	4th of 5 CRJHL	Won Play In, 2-0 (Satelites); Lost SemiFinals, 1-4 (Fishermen)
2020–21	7	2	2	0	1	2	10	22	21	0.476	3rd of 5 CRJHL	League play suspended in November due to COVID-19
2021–22	32	19	10	0	2	1	62	169	109	0.646	2nd of 5 CRJHL	Won SemiFinals, 4-0 (Warriors); Lost Finals, 0-4 (Fishermen)
2022–23	30	15	12	0	2	1	50	105	94	0.556	3rd of 6 CRJHL	Won QuarterFinals, 3-1 (Satelites); Lost Semifinals, 3-4 (Warriors)
2023–24	30	8	18	1	1	2	29	90	148	0.322	6th of 6 CRJHL	Lost QuarterFinals, 0-3 (Comets)
2024–25	30	7	22	0	1	0	22	91	164	0.256	6th of 7 CRJHL	Lost QuarterFinals, 0-3 (Falcons)
2025–26	30	7	18	2	3	0	28	112	153	0.311	5th of 7 CRJHL	Lost QuarterFinals, 1-3 (Habs)

== Keystone Cup ==
Western Canadian Jr. B Championships (Northern Ontario to British Columbia)
Six teams in round-robin play. 1st vs. 2nd for gold/silver & 3rd vs. 4th for bronze.

Year	Round-robin	Record	Standing	Bronze medal game	Gold medal game
2011	T, Thunder Bay Northern Hawks, 3–3; L, Pilot Butte Storm, 2–3; L, Sherwood Park Knights, 0–7; L, Blackfalds Wranglers, 5–8; L, Peninsula Panthers, 3–8	0–4–1	6th of 6	—	—
2012	L, Whitecourt Wolverines, 3–8; W, Pilot Butte Storm, 2–1; L, Abbotsford Pilots, 0–10; L, Thunder Bay Northern Hawks, 5–7; L, Saskatoon Royals, 2–5	1–4–0	5th of 6	—	—
2017; Host	W, Peguis Juniors, 7–2; L, Regina Capitals, 3–12; L, Beaver Valley Nitehawks, 1–9; L, Wainwright Bisons, 0–5; W, Nipigon Elks, 9–4	2–3–0	4th of 6	L, Regina Capitals, 2–6	—

== Team information ==
=== Team captains ===
- Brennan Zasitko, 2006–2007
- Myles Willis, 2007–2008
- Mackenzie Jones 2009–2010
- Bryant Gudmundson 2010–2011
- Brock McMahon 2012–2013
- Ryan Pochailo 2016–2017
- Derric Gulay 2017–2019
- Josh Roche 2019–2021
- Jack Einarson 2021–2022
- Tre Strachan 2022–2023
- N/A 2023–2024
- Tyson Barylski 2024–2025

=== Coaches ===
- Dave Sigvaldason, 2006–2008
- Ray Neufeld & Kevin Campbell 2008–2009
- Jim Werbicki 2009–2012
- Ron Schalk 2012–2015
- Cody Didychuk 2015–2017
- Jim Werbicki 2017–2020
- Murray Monkman 2020–2022
- Scott Wong 2022–Present
