= Selkirk Recreation Complex =

Indoor ice arena and community centre in Selkirk, Manitoba, Canada

- Interactive map of Selkirk Recreation Complex
- Location: 180 Easton Drive; Selkirk, Manitoba
- Coordinates: 50.1606°N 96.8898°W
- Operator: City of Selkirk
- Capacity: 2,751 (hockey)

Construction
- Opened: 1992

Tenants
- Selkirk Steelers (MJHL) 1992-present Selkirk Fishermen (KJHL) 1992-present

Website
- cityofselkirk.com

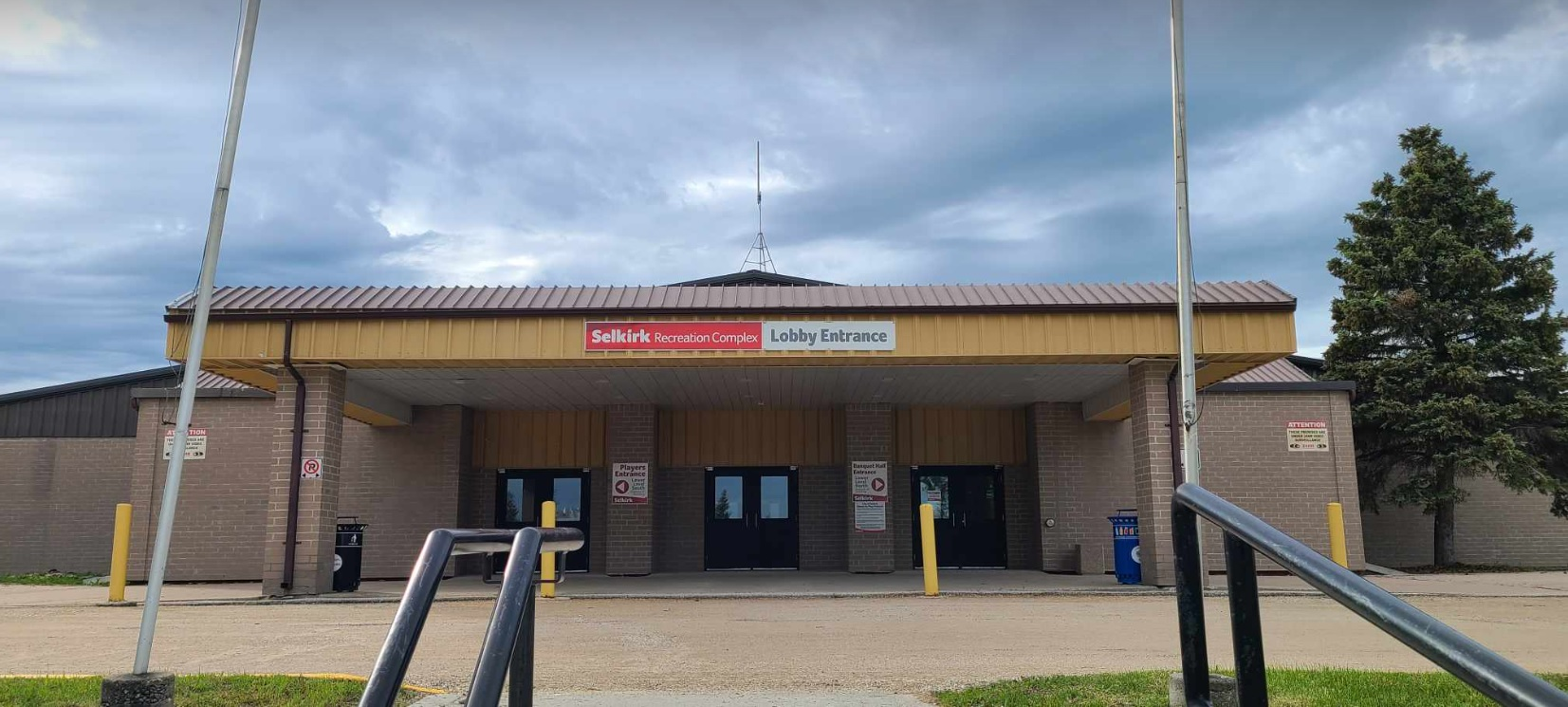

The Selkirk Recreation Complex is an indoor ice hockey, figure skating arena and community centre located in Selkirk, Manitoba, Canada.

The city-owned facility, which opened in 1992, features a 2,751-seat arena and 500-person banquet hall. Its primary tenants are the Selkirk Steelers of the Manitoba Junior Hockey League, the Selkirk Fishermen of the Keystone Junior Hockey League, the Selkirk Figure Skating Club and Selkirk's minor hockey program.

== Major events ==
The complex has hosted a number of major International Ice Hockey Federation (IIHF) events in co-operation with the City of Winnipeg, including select games of the 1999 World Junior Hockey Championships and the 2007 Women's World Hockey Championships.

In December 2001 and January 2002, Selkirk and the neighbouring town of Stonewall co-hosted the World Under-17 Hockey Challenge, an annual international minor hockey tournament organized by Hockey Canada. The United States defeated Canada's Team Pacific to win the gold medal.

In April 2009, Selkirk hosted the Telus Cup, the Canadian national midget hockey championship, with the Winnipeg Thrashers as the host team. The Notre Dame Hounds defeated the Calgary Buffaloes 4–0 in the championship game to win the gold medal, which was broadcast live on TSN.
