= Keystone Junior Hockey League =

Junior ice hockey league

- President: Marcel Fontaine
- Former name: Manitoba Junior 'B' Hockey League (1977–2004)
- Founded: 1977
- No. of teams: 5
- Associated titles: Baldy Northcott Trophy; Keystone Cup
- Recent champions: OCN Storm (2026)
- Most successful club: Selkirk Fishermen
- Website: keystonejr.ca

The Keystone Junior Hockey League (KJHL) is a Junior 'B' ice hockey league in Manitoba, Canada. It was formerly known as the Manitoba Junior 'B' Hockey League (1977–2004).

== History ==
The KJHL champion used to play the champion of the Northwest Junior Hockey League (NJHL) for the Baldy Northcott Trophy. Since the demise of the NJHL in 2004, the KJHL has been the only Junior 'B' league in the province; thus its champion has been awarded the provincial title. The provincial champion moves on to compete for the Western Canadian Junior 'B' championship, the Keystone Cup.

In 2018, five southern teams of the KJHL announced they were leaving and forming their own league, the Capital Region Junior Hockey League (CRJHL). The five departing clubs Arborg Ice Dawgs, Lundar Falcons, North Winnipeg Satelites, Selkirk Fishermen and St. Malo Warriors cited travel costs as well as parents expressing concerns for bus travel in light of the 2018 Humboldt Broncos bus tragedy. The Fisher River Hawks also announced they would be taking a one-year leave of absence from the league.

The league added another team after their 2019 AGM with the NCN Flames joining for the 2019–20 season. NCN Flames last competed in the Northwest Junior Hockey League in 2004 winning two league championships and one Baldy Northcott Trophy (2002).

The Peter Ballantyne Cree Nation PBCN Selects joined as an expansion franchise in 2022, and the Waywayseecappo Wild joined as an expansion franchise in 2023. The league announced at the beginning of the 2024–25 season that both teams were taking a one-year leave of absence due to "unfortunate and unforeseen circumstances", but that both teams would return in the 2025–26 season.

== Teams ==
Team	Home	Arena	Active since
Cross Lake Islanders	Cross Lake	Cross Lake Sports Complex	2006
NCN Flames	Nelson House	Gilbert McDonald Arena	2019
Norway House North Stars	Norway House	Kinosao Sipi Multiplex	2004
OCN Storm	Opaskwayak Cree Nation	Gordon Lathlin Memorial	2012
Peguis Juniors	Peguis	Peguis Multiplex	1994

=== Defunct teams ===
- Arborg Ice Dawgs (2006–2018)
- Brandon Stingers (1991–1999)
- Carberry Plainsmen (1989–1992)
- Central Plains Feathermen (1994–1995)
- Ebb & Flow Flyers (1998–2000; 2002–2003)
- Fisher River Hawks (2014–2018)
- Gimli Vikings (1978–1998)
- Kewatin Canucks (1982–1984)
- Lorette Roadrunners (1986–1987)
- Lundar Falcons (2010–2018)
- North East Comets (1980–1983)
- Beausejour Comets (1984–1996)
- North Lake United (1986–1994)
- North Winnipeg Satelites (1980–2018)
- Oak Bluff Raiders (1986–1990)
- Pine Creek Warriors (1999–2000)
- Pineview Saints (1981–1982; 1983–1985)
- Portage Terriers (1981–1987)
- Red River Rockets (1989–1994)
- Sagkeeng Braves (1994–1997)
- Sagkeeng Hawks (2001–2008; 2010–2011)
- Sanford Titans (2008–2010)
- Selkirk Fishermen (1977–2018)
- Souris Elks (1993–1996)
- St. Boniface Seals (1998–2005)
- Winnipeg Saints (2005–2008)
- St. Claude Knights (1981–1984; 1986–1992; 1996–1997; 2000–2003)
- St. Malo Warriors (1994–2018)
- Ste. Anne Aces (1991–1993)
- Ste. Rose Royals (1992–1994)
- Steinbach Millers (1974–1979; 1981–1983)
- Stonewall Jets (1997–2001)
- Transcona Railers (1977–1982)
- Two Nation River Hawks (2006–2009)
- PBCN Selects (2022–2024)
- Waywayseecappo Wild (2023–2024)

== Champions ==
- 1978 - Transcona Railers
- 1979 - Transcona Railers
- 1980 - Transcona Railers
- 1981 - Transcona Railers
- 1982 - Transcona Railers
- 1983 - North Winnipeg Satelites
- 1984 - Selkirk Fishermen
- 1985 - North Winnipeg Satelites
- 1986 - North Winnipeg Satelites
- 1987 - Oak Bluff Raiders
- 1988 - North Winnipeg Satelites
- 1989 - North Winnipeg Satelites
- 1990 - Beausejour Comets
- 1991 - Selkirk Fishermen
- 1992 - Selkirk Fishermen
- 1993 - Selkirk Fishermen
- 1994 - Selkirk Fishermen
- 1995 - St. Malo Warriors
- 1996 - Peguis Juniors
- 1997 - St. Malo Warriors
- 1998 - Peguis Juniors
- 1999 - Selkirk Fishermen
- 2000 - St. Malo Warriors
- 2001 - St. Malo Warriors
- 2002 - North Winnipeg Satelites
- 2003 - North Winnipeg Satelites
- 2004 - Selkirk Fishermen
- 2005 - Selkirk Fishermen
- 2006 - North Winnipeg Satelites
- 2007 - Winnipeg Saints
- 2008 - Norway House North Stars
- 2009 - St. Malo Warriors
- 2010 - Selkirk Fishermen
- 2011 - Arborg Ice Dawgs
- 2012 - Arborg Ice Dawgs
- 2013 - Peguis Juniors
- 2014 - Selkirk Fishermen
- 2015 - Selkirk Fishermen
- 2016 - Peguis Juniors
- 2017 - Peguis Juniors
- 2018 - Peguis Juniors
- 2019 - Peguis Juniors
- 2020 - Not awarded
- 2021 - Not awarded
- 2022 - Peguis Juniors
- 2023 - Peguis Juniors
- 2024 - Peguis Juniors
- 2025 - OCN Storm
- 2026 - OCN Storm

== Notable alumni ==
- Darren Helm (2003–04) – Selkirk Fishermen
- Brady Keeper (2012–13) – Norway House North Stars

== See also ==
- List of ice hockey teams in Manitoba
