= Beausejour Sportsplex =

Coordinates: 50.0531°N 96.5030°W

- Interactive map of Beausejour Sportsplex
- Location: Beausejour, Manitoba, Canada
- Capacity: 1,100 (ice hockey)

Construction
- Opened: 2002

Tenants
- Beausejour Beavers (MSHL) 2002-2016; Beausejour Blades (MJHL) 2007-2009; Beausejour Shock (HTJHL) 2010-2013; Eastman Selects (MU18HL) 2009-2025; Beausejour Comets (CRJHL) 2022-present

Website
- townofbeausejour.ca

The Beausejour Sportsplex (formerly Sun Gro Centre) is a multi-purpose recreation complex located in the town of Beausejour, Manitoba. The complex features a 1,100 seat ice hockey arena, a curling club, an outdoor pool, and an indoor walking track.

The complex opened in 2002 and was completed at a cost of $2.75 million. The project was primarily funded by the taxpayers of Beausejour and the Rural Municipality of Brokenhead. The federal government contributed $250,000. The naming rights to the facility were sold to Sun Gro Horticulture.

The Beausejour Sportsplex is the home arena for the Eastman Selects of the Manitoba Midget 'AAA' Hockey League and the Beausejour Comets of the Capital Region Junior Hockey League. Previously, the Beausejour Sportsplex also hosted the Beausejour Beavers of the Manitoba Senior Hockey League and the Beausejour Blades of the Manitoba Junior Hockey League. Beausejour's minor hockey and ringette teams also play their home games at the arena.

The Beausejour Sportsplex has hosted three Manitoba provincial curling championships – the 2004 Scott Tournament of Hearts, the 2011 Safeway Championship, and the 2016 Manitoba Scotties Tournament of Hearts.
