= Verna Kirkness =

Cree scholar and indigenous language proponent

Verna Jane Kirkness
- Born: 1967 (age 58–59); Fisher River Cree Nation, Manitoba
- Citizenship: Canadian
- Education: B.A (1974); B.Ed. (1976); Master of Education (1980)
- Alma mater: University of Manitoba
- Employer: University of British Columbia
- Awards: Order of Canada (1998), Order of Manitoba (2007), Queen's Golden Jubilee Medal (2003)

Verna Jane Kirkness, CM OM (born 1935 in Fisher River Cree Nation, Manitoba) is a Cree scholar, pioneer and lifelong proponent of indigenous language, culture and education who has been influential in Canadian indigenous education policy and practice. She is an associate professor emeritus at the University of British Columbia and resides in Winnipeg. Kirkness has received numerous awards for her outstanding contributions spanning five decades including the Order of Canada in 1998. Kirkness had an important impact on Canadian indigenous education policy and practice. She is the author of "numerous books and articles on the history of Indigenous education." The University of Manitoba's Verna J. Kirkness Science and Engineering Education Program was established in 2009 and in November 2013 a native studies colloquium honoured her as a national leader in education.

== Early years ==
Kirkness attended a private high school in the 1950s, 160 kilometres away from Fisher River with her tuition paid by the Women's Missionary Society of Canada.

== Education ==
Kirkness graduated from the Manitoba Normal School with a Teaching Certificate in 1959. She completed her B.A (1974), B.Ed. (1976) and Master of Education (1980) at the University of Manitoba.

== Career ==
With her teaching certificate in 1959, Kirkness began to teach in a residential school. She taught elementary school in the Manitoba public school system then worked as principal in First Nations schools. While acting as the "first cross-cultural consultant for the Manitoba Department of Education Curriculum Branch" and Elementary School Supervisor with Frontier School Division from 1967 to 1970, Kirkness launched a language immersion program in Cree and Ojibwa in several Manitoba schools.

== Manitoba Indian Brotherhood ==
In the early 1970s, she was the first education director for the Manitoba Indian Brotherhood—now known as the Assembly of Manitoba Chiefs—and then the National Indian Brotherhood where she played a pivotal role in the publication of the two quintessential policy documents, "Wahbung: Our Tomorrows" (1971) and "Indian Control of Indian Education" (1972). "These two major works have shaped First Nations education in Canada for more than 40 years."

=== Wahbung: Our Tomorrows ===
Kirkness participated in the development and implementation of the Manitoba Indian Brotherhood (MIB)'s 1971 position paper entitled "Wahbung: Our Tomorrows"—written in opposition to then-Prime Minister Pierre Elliott Trudeau's 1969 White Paper which proposed the abolition of the Indian Act. The federal government at the time argued that the Indian Act was discriminatory and that the special legal relationship between Aboriginal peoples and the Canadian state should be dismantled in favour of equality, in accordance with Trudeau's vision of a "just society." The federal government proposed that by eliminating "Indian" as a distinct legal status, the resulting equality among all Canadians would help resolve the problems faced by Aboriginal peoples. After opposition from many Aboriginal leaders—including the MIB—the white paper was abandoned in 1970.

== National Indian Brotherhood ==
Kirkness also participated in the development of the landmark 1972 national policy—the first written policy on Indian education—entitled "Indian Control of Indian Education"—which the Chiefs of the National Indian Brotherhood adopted and then presented to then-Minister of Indian Affairs and Northern Development—Jean Chrétien—on December 21, 1972.

== University of British Columbia ==
When Kirkness joined the faculty at the University of British Columbia in 1981, she was appointed director of the Native teacher education program where she "worked to extend new programs, support services and cultural enrichment to Aboriginal students," providing leadership for the Native Teacher Education Program (NITEP) and creating the Ts’kel Graduate Program. Kirkness became the first director of UBC's First Nations House of Learning in 1985 and she was also instrumental in the conception and construction of the First Nations Longhouse which opened on the campus in 1993."

== Canadian Indigenous Languages and Literacy Development Institute (CILLDI) ==
She was also an inspiration and a catalyst for the creation of Canadian Indigenous Languages and Literacy Development Institute (CILLDI) in 1999.—an intensive annual "summer school for Indigenous language activists, speakers, linguists, and teachers"—hosted at the University of Alberta, Edmonton In her 2008 presentation to the United Nations, Priscilla Settee described how "Cree scholars and language specialists, Dr. Freda Ahenakew and Dr. Verna Kirkness ... helped inspire the development of the CILLDI."

== Awards and honours ==
Kirkness has received numerous awards, including the "Outstanding Educator of British Columbia award (1990), the Golden Eagle Feather Award from the Professional Native Women's Association and the Canadian Youth Education Excellence Prize as Canada's Educator of the Year. She received the Aboriginal Achievement Award for her work in 1994. She has also been awarded the Order of Canada (1998) Order of Manitoba (2007), Queen's Golden Jubilee Medal (2003) as well as honorary degrees from UBC (1994), University of Western Ontario (1992) and Mount St. Vincent (1990), and the University of Manitoba (2008)."

The Verna J. Kirkness Science and Engineering Education Program at the University of Manitoba, was founded in 2009 in her honour with a mandate to "[i]ncrease the number of First Nations, Métis and Inuit students graduating from science and engineering programs in Canada." This Program has since been expanded to other universities across Canada.

== Publications ==
Kirkness has "written and edited eight books and is published extensively in academic journals" including her 2013 autobiography entitled Creating Space: My Life and Work in Indigenous Education. The title referred to her work at UBC in "terms of access and support to enable Aboriginal students to enter any of the faculties was a way to make space in higher learning." Like the Lakota scholar Vine Deloria, Verna argued that "Aboriginal history, values, and knowledge are not just for Natives."

== Linguistic discourse ==
"Kirkness maintains that language is key to identity, and Aboriginal people are more likely to maintain their identity if governments give the same support to Indigenous languages as they have to French language retention: Language is the principal means whereby culture is accumulated, shared and transmitted from one generation to another. Language expresses the uniqueness of a group's world view."

— Kirkness 1998:4 cited in Settee 2007:107

In her 2007 doctoral dissertation Patricia Settee identified Kirkness along with Cree scholar Dr. Freda Ahenakew (1999) and Finnish linguist and educator, Tove Skutnabb-Kangas, as the three main contributors to new scholarship on linguistic discourse. Settee noted that this new scholarship on linguistic, cultural and critical political discourse- that establishes "necessary varied theoretical and practical strands" represented "Indigenous world views and methodologies" and integrating storytelling. Settee's PhD literature review discussed "cultural and linguistic knowledge that builds on the work of Cree linguists Ahenakew and Kirkness and the Canadian Indigenous Languages and Literacy Development Institute (CILLDI) at the University of Alberta.
