= Sanford Titans =

Sanford Titans
League	Keystone Junior Hockey League
Founded	2008
History	Sanford Titans; 2008–2010
Home Arena	Sanford Ice Centre
City	Sanford, Manitoba
Team Colours	Black, Maroon, Silver, Vegas Gold
President	
General Manager	Mike Demidiuk

The Sanford Titans were a junior "B" ice hockey team based in Sanford, Manitoba, and members of the Keystone Junior Hockey League (KJHL). The franchise was founded in 2008.

== Coaches ==
- Mike Demidiuk, 2008–
