= La Broquerie Habs =

Junior ice hockey club

- City: La Broquerie
- League: CRJHL
- Founded: 2024
- Home arena: HyLife Centre
- Colours
- Head coach: Dan Taillefer
- Website: habsjrb.ca

Championships
- League: 2026

The La Broquerie Habs are a junior ice hockey club and franchise of the Capital Region Junior Hockey League (CRJHL). The team plays its home games at the HyLife Centre in La Broquerie, Manitoba.

== Team identity ==
The "La Broquerie Habs" team name has a history dating back to 1948 and has been used by multiple teams over the years, and is also the name of the La Broquerie minor hockey association. In January 2024, the community celebrated the "75th anniversary of La Broquerie Habs hockey." The scheduled events included a friendly game between Montreal Canadiens alumni and local La Broquerie hockey alumni. The community had similarly celebrated the 40th, 45th, 50th and 65th milestone anniversaries. Following the announcement that the CRJHL had approved an expansion franchise in La Broquerie, local media reported, "There was no question what the new CRJHL team in La Broquerie would be called."

== Arena ==
The team plays its home games at the HyLife Center in La Broquerie. The building has a seating capacity of 379, plus standing room for 121. It opened in 1978, and expanded in 2015. The building underwent extensive renovations in 2023 when it became the temporary home of the Steinbach Pistons during the 2023–24 MJHL season.

== History ==
In their first season, the Habs played 30 games, securing 13 wins, 15 losses, and 2 overtime losses, accumulating 41 points and finishing 4th in the league standings. Their inaugural campaign concluded with a quarterfinal loss in the postseason against the Selkirk Fishermen.

In the 2025–26 season, the Habs took the league championship defeating the Selkirk Fishermen 4 games to 3 in the final.

Statistics
Season	GP	W	L	T	OTW	OTL	Pts	GF	GA	Pct	Regular season	Playoffs
2024–25	30	13	15	0	0	2	41	115	123	.456	4th place	Lost quarterfinal against Selkirk (3:1)
2025–26	30	16	11	0	1	2	52	120	101	.578	2nd place	Won quarterfinal against North Winnipeg (3:0); Won semifinal against St. Malo (4:2); Won final against Selkirk (4:3)
