= Lundar Falcons =

Junior ice hockey team

- City: Lundar, Manitoba
- League: CRJHL
- Founded: 2010
- Home arena: Lundar Arena
- Colours
- General manager: Brad Drews
- Head coach: Tyler Medeiros
- Website: lundarfalcons.com

The Lundar Falcons are a Junior ice hockey team based in Lundar, Manitoba. Home games are played at Lundar Arena.

== History ==
Lundar Falcons were formed for the 2010–11 season as a member of the Keystone Junior Hockey League, where they competed until 2018.

The team had one of their best seasons in 2012–13 under then head coach Arnie Caplan, who helped guide the team to its first finish above .500 mark. Caplan would go on to coach at Portage College and Waywayseecappo Wolverines.

For the 2018-19 season the Falcons were one of five teams that departed the Keystone Junior Hockey League and established the Capital Region Junior Hockey League. Despite finishing last in the regular season the Falcons won five games in the playoffs before losing to eventual league champion Selkirk Fishermen in Game 7.

== Season-by-season record ==
Note: GP = Games played, W = Wins, L = Losses, T = Ties, OTL = Overtime Losses, Pts = Points, GF = Goals for, GA = Goals against

Records as of 2017–18 regular season.

Season	GP	W	L	T	OTL	Pts	GF	GA	Pts %	Finish	Playoffs
2010–11	32	5	27	0	0	10	109	277	0.156	7th	Lost Quarterfinals, 3–0
2011–12	36	12	23	0	1	25	159	195	0.347	6th	Lost Quarterfinals, 3–1
2012–13	36	18	14	0	4	40	187	182	0.556	5th	Lost Quarterfinals, 1–3 (Warriors)
2013–14	34	8	24	0	2	18	126	217	0.265	4th, South	Lost Div. Semifinals, 0–3 (Fishermen)
2014–15	32	8	22	0	2	18	105	157	0.281	8th	Lost Quarterfinals, 1–3 (Fishermen)
2015–16	34	16	13	0	5	37	148	137	0.544	3rd of 5, South; 5th of 10, KJHL	Lost Semifinals, 2–3 (Warriors)
2016–17	34	9	24	0	1	19	122	178	0.279	3rd of 4, South; 8th of 10, KJHL	Lost Quarterfinals, 0–3 (Warriors)
2017–18	34	17	13	0	4	38	153	139	0.559	2nd of 4, South; 5th of 10, KJHL	Won Quarterfinals, 3-2 (Ice Dawgs); Lost Semifinals, 0-4 (Juniors)

CAPITAL REGION JUNIOR HOCKEY LEAGUE
Season	GP	W	L	T	OTW	OTL	Pts	GF	GA	Pct	Finish	Playoffs
2018–19	32	8	16	2	3	3	35	120	142	0.365	5th of 5 CRJHL	Won Survivor Series, 2-1 (Warriors); Lost Semifinals, 3-4 (Fishermen)
2019–20	32	14	15	0	1	2	46	132	130	0.479	3rd of 5 CRJHL	Lost Semifinals, 3-4 Warriors)
2020–21	6	3	1	0	1	1	12	26	14	0.667	2nd of 5 CRJHL	League play suspended in November due to COVID-19
2021–22	32	8	22	1	0	1	26	97	166	0.271	5th of 5 CRJHL	Won Survivor Series, 2-0 (Satelites); Lost Semifinals, 0-4 (Fishermen)
2022–23	30	8	17	3	0	2	32	83	115	0.356	4th of 6 CRJHL	Won Survivor Series, 3-0 (Comets); Lost Semifinals, 0-4 (Fishermen)
2023–24	30	11	12	0	5	2	45	106	89	0.500	3rd of 6 CRJHL	Won Survivor Series, 3-2 (Satelites); Lost Semifinals, 0-4 (Warriors)
2024–25	30	17	11	0	2	0	55	107	100	0.611	3rd of 7 CRJHL	Won Quarterfinals, 3-0 (Ice Dawgs); Lost Semifinals, 1-4 (Comets)
2025–26	30	5	19	0	3	3	24	136	188	0.267	6th of 7 CRJHL	Lost Quarterfinals, 2-3 (Fishermen)

== Team records ==
=== Team scoring leaders ===
These are the top point-scorers season by season.

Note: Pos = Position; GP = Games played; G = Goals; A = Assists; Pts = Points

Player	Seasons	Pos	GP	G	A	Pts
Michael LaFreniere	2010-2011	F	27	21	27	48
Michael LaFreniere	2011-2012	F	34	29	30	59
Darryl Flett	2012-2013	F	35	27	37	64
Tyler Medeiros	2013-2014	F	32	15	20	35
Storm Swan	2014-2015	F	28	15	13	28
Bryce Horning	2015-2016	F	32	41	25	66
Landon Gray	2016-2017	F	27	29	26	55
Landon Gray	2017-2018	F	17	31	14	45
Eric Miller	2018-2019	F	26	13	12	25
TBD	2019-2020	?	0	0	0	0

=== Individual records ===
Season

- Most goals in a season: Bryce Horning, 41 (2015–16)
- Most assists in a season: Daryl Flett, 37 (2012–13)
- Most points in a season: Bryce Horning, 66 (2015–16)
- Most points in a season, defenseman: Roy Ettawacapo, 34 (2012–13)
- Most points in a season, rookie: Bryce Horning, 66 (2015-16)
- Most penalty minutes in a season: Orrin Hogue, 190 (2013-14)
- Most wins in a season: Derrick Pietsch, 11 (2012–13)

Playoffs

- Most goals in a playoff season: Michael LaFreniere, 4 (2011–12)
- Most assists in a playoff season: Michael LaFreniere, 5 (2011–12)
- Most points in a playoff season: Michael LaFreniere, 9 (2011–12)
- Most points in a playoff season, defenseman: Orrin Hogue, 2 (2010–11)
- Most points in a playoff season, rookie: unknown
- Most wins in a playoff season: Christopher Lesage, 5 (2018-19)
