= St. Malo Warriors =

Junior ice hockey club

St. Malo Junior Warriors
- City: St. Malo, Manitoba
- League: CRJHL
- Founded: 1994
- Home arena: St. Malo Arena
- Colours: Green; Red
- General manager: Ralph Collette
- Head coach: Patrick Trudeau

Franchise history
- 1994–2018: KJHL
- Since 2018: CRJHL

Championships
- KJHL: 1995; 1997; 2000; 2001; 2009
- CRJHL: 2024; 2025

The St. Malo Warriors are a junior ice hockey club and franchise of the Capital Region Junior Hockey League (CRJHL). The team plays its home games at the St. Malo Arena in St. Malo, Manitoba.

The club was a member of the Keystone Junior Hockey League (KJHL) until 2018. For the 2018–19 season the Warriors were one of five teams that departed the Keystone Junior Hockey League and established the Capital Region Junior Hockey League.

The Warriors have six league championships to their credit, first winning the KJHL title in 1995. The team first medaled at the Keystone Cup in 1997 when they claimed silver after losing to host Grenfell Storm in the championship game.

As KJHL champion, the Warriors traveled to Thunder Bay in 2009 for the Keystone Cup. They finished the round robin with one win in five games, failing to qualify for the medal round.

St. Malo hosted the Keystone Cup in 2013, losing all five round robin games.

The Warriors returned to the Keystone in 2018 as playoff runner-up along with the champion Peguis Juniors in a border battle with the Lakehead Junior Hockey League champion and runner up. They would win one of three games and did not qualify for the playoff round.

St. Malo Warriors claimed their first CRJHL title in 2024 defeating the Beausejour Comets in six games. After dropping the first two games of the series, the Warriors won four straight games to win their first league championship in 15 years.

== Season-by-season records ==
Note: GP = Games played, W = Wins, L = Losses, T = Ties, OTL = Overtime Losses, Pts = Points, GF = Goals for, GA = Goals against, PCT = Winning Percentage

Season	GP	W	L	T	OTL	Pts	GF	GA	PCT	Finish	Playoffs
2004–05	36	24	11	1	0	49	213	110	.681	2nd	
2005–06	36	12	23	0	1	25	—	—	.347	7th	
2006–07	40	20	19	0	1	41	211	207	.512	4th	
2007–08	40	28	11	0	1	57	260	162	.713	1st	KJHL finalists
2008–09	36	22	10	0	4	48	217	149	.667	4th	KJHL Champions; Keystone Cup: 5th (1–4–0)
2009–10	32	19	9	0	4	42	186	112	.656	4th	
2010–11	32	18	13	0	1	37	176	115	.578	6th	
2011–12	36	8	24	0	4	20	112	192	.278	7th	
2012–13	36	22	12	0	2	46	207	153	.639	4th	Lost semi-finals
2013–14	34	14	17	1	2	31	133	154	.456	3rd of 4, South; 5th of 8, KJHL	Lost div. semi-finals
2014–15	32	15	16	0	1	31	158	155	.484	6th	Won quarter-finals, 3–2 (Ice Dawgs); Lost semi-finals, 0–4 (Fishermen)
2015–16	34	21	10	0	3	45	162	128	.662	2nd of 5, South; 4th of 10, KJHL	Won div. semi-finals, 3–2(Falcons); Lost div. finals, 2–4 (Fishermen)
2016–17	34	24	9	0	1	49	233	137	.721	1st of 4, South; 1st of 10, KJHL	Won quarter-finals, 3–0 (Falcons); Lost semi-finals, 3–4 (Juniors)
2017–18	34	16	13	0	5	37	149	125	.544	3rd of 4, South; 6th of 10, KJHL	Won quarter-finals, 3–1 (Storm); Won semi-finals, 4–3 (Fishermen); Lost league finals, 1–4 (Juniors)

CAPITAL REGION JUNIOR HOCKEY LEAGUE
Season	GP	W	L	T	OTW	OTL	Pts	Pct	GF	GA	Finish	Playoffs
2018–19	32	14	17	0	0	1	43	0.448	120	142	4th of 5	Lost Survivor Series, 1-2 (Falcons)
2019–20	32	22	6	0	3	1	73	0.760	143	73	2nd of 5	Won semi-finals, 4–0 (Falcons); DNF finals 0-0, (Fishermen); Playoff suspended due to COVID-19
2020–21	5	2	3	0	0	0	6	0.400	19	17	4th of 5	League play suspended in November due to COVID-19
2021-22	32	11	17	1	1	2	38	0.396	98	130	3rd of 5	Lost semi-finals, 0–4 (Ice Dawgs)
2022-23	30	21	6	2	0	1	68	0.765	141	73	2nd of 6	Won semi-finals, 4-3 (Ice Dawgs); Lost league finals 1-4 (Fishermen)
2023-24	30	18	10	1	1	0	57	0.633	120	87	2nd of 6	Won semi-finals, 4-0 (Falcons); Won league finals, 4-2 (Comets)
2024-25	30	24	5	0	1	0	74	0.822	186	79	1st of 7'	Won semi-finals, 4-1 (Fishermen); Won league finals, 4-3 (Comets)
2025-26	30	22	5	0	3	0	72	0.800	154	81	1st of 7'	Lost semi-finals, 2-4 (Habs)

== Regional championships ==
Year	Round-robin	Record	Standing	Bronze medal game	Gold medal game
2009	L, Saskatoon Royals, 1–7; L, Thunder Bay Wolverines, 4–5; W, Thunder Bay Northern Hawks, 6–2; L, Richmond Sockeyes, 0–5; L, Lloydminster Bandits, 3–4	1–4–0	5th of 6	Did not advance	
2013; Host	L, Peguis Juniors, 4–10; L, Thunder Bay Northern Hawks, 1–7; L, Richmond Sockeyes, 1–9; L, Okotoks Bisons, 2–3; L, Saskatoon Royals, 2–7	0–5–0	6th of 6	Did not advance	
2018	L, Thunder Bay Northern Hawks, 1–7; W, Thunder Bay Fighting Walleye, 3–1; L, Peguis Juniors, 1–8	1–2–0	4th of 4	Did not advance	
