= Altona Maroons =

Junior ice hockey club

- City: Altona, Manitoba
- League: CRJHL
- Founded: 2026
- Home arena: Sunflower Gardens
- Colours
- General manager: Scott Cherewayko
- Head coach: Mark Thiessen
- Website: altonamaroonsjrb.ca

The Altona Maroons Junior B Hockey Club is a junior ice hockey club and franchise of the Capital Region Junior Hockey League (CRJHL). The team plays its home games at the Sunflower Gardens arena in Altona, Manitoba.

The club was established as an expanion franchise in 2026, however, the "Altona Maroons" name has historical significance to the local community. The defunct Altona Maroons senior ice hockey club was a charter member of the South Eastern Manitoba Hockey League (SEMHL) from 1951–2024.

== Sources ==
- Anthony, Dave (18 December 2025). "Altona Maroons poised enter CRJHL in 2026-27". PembinaValleyOnline.
- Anthony, Dave (5 March 2026). "Altona Maroons announce coaches for upcoming season". PembinaValleyOnline.
- "CRJHL welcomes Altona Maroons as 8th franchise". crjhl.com. Capital Region Junior Hockey League. 27 April 2026.
- Anderson, Gavin (11 October 2026). "Hockey Night in Altona returns as Maroons host franchise home opener". PembinaValleyOnline.
