= Sagkeeng Hawks =

Sagkeeng Hawks
City	Fort Alexander, Manitoba
Address	Box 9 Fort Alexander, Manitoba R0E 0P0
League	Keystone Junior Hockey League
Founded	1998
History	Sagkeeng Hawks; 1998–2011
Home Arena	Sagkeeng Arena Multiplex
Colours	Black, White and Red
Manager	Paul Guimond
Head coach	Henry Guimond Sr.
Team Captain	Larry Canard
Keystone Cups	0
League Titles	0

Sagkeeng Hawks were a junior "B" ice hockey team based in Fort Alexander, Manitoba, Canada, and members of the Keystone Junior Hockey League (KJHL).
