= Beausejour Comets =

Junior ice hockey team in Manitoba, Canada

- City: Beausejour, Manitoba
- League: CRJHL
- Founded: 2022
- Home arena: Beausejour Sportsplex
- Colours
- General manager: Curt Ramsden
- Head coach: Troy Kennedy
- Website: beausejourcomets.com

The Beausejour Comets are a Junior ice hockey team based in Beausejour, Manitoba in the Capital Region Junior Hockey League.

The team finished its inaugural 2022–23 regular season tied for 4th place (out of 6) with the Lundar Falcons. The Comets were subsequently eliminated from the playoffs by the Lundar Falcons after losing 3 games straight in the first round. The team finished the 2023–24 regular season tied for 3rd place (out of 7) with the Lundar Falcons. The Comets fared better in the post-season while making it to the final round before ultimately losing to the St. Malo Warriors in 6 games. In 2024–25, the Comets finished the regular season in second place and reached the final round of the playoffs before losing to the first-place St. Malo Warriors in seven games.

Statistics
Season	GP	W	L	T	OTW	OTL	Pts	Finish	Playoffs
2022–23	30	8	16	1	2	3	32	4th overall	Lost quarterfinal against Falcons (3:0)
2023–24	30	14	14	0	1	1	45	3rd overall	Won quarterfinal against Ice Dawgs (3:0); Won semifinal against Fishermen (4:1); Lost final against Warriors (4:2)
2024–25	30	22	5	0	1	2	70	2nd overall	Won quarterfinal against Satelites (3:0); Won semifinal against Falcons (4:1); Lost final against Warriors (4:3)
2025–26	30	23	6	0	1	0	71	2nd overall	Won quarterfinal against North Winnipeg (3:0); Lost semifinal against Selkirk (4:1)
