= Fisher River Cree Nation =

First Nation in Canada

Fisher River Cree Nation ᐅᒉᑯ ᓰᐱᐩ ocêko-sîpiy Band number: 264
- Fisher River Cree Nation Manitoba
- Coordinates: 51°26′20″N 97°22′00″W
- Country: Canada

Government
  - Type: First Nations Council
  - Chief: David Crate
  - Councillors: Delaney Mason, Hillary Murdock, Darrell Thaddeus, Barry Wilson
- Time zone: UTC-6 (CST)
  - Summer (DST): UTC-5 (CDT)
- Postal code span: R0C 1S0
- Area code: 204
- Website: Official Website
- Box 367, Koostatak, MB, R0C 1S0

Fisher River (Cree: ᐅᒉᑯ ᓰᐱᐩ, ocêko-sîpiy) is a Cree First Nations reserve located approximately 193 km north of Manitoba's capital city, Winnipeg. The Fisher River Cree Nation is composed of two reserves; Fisher River 44 and Fisher River 44A. The reserve population is 1,945, and the off reserve population is 1,934, for a total of 3,879 band members as of June 2017. Fisher River is 15,614 acres (6,319 hectares).

Fisher River is named after the fisher, a North American mammal which belongs to the same family as weasels and skunks.

The chief of Fisher River is David Crate.

== History ==
=== Norway House ===
Norway House

The Fisher River Cree Nation were among the hundreds of Cree who began trading at Norway House—the administrative centre for Rupert’s Land—the watershed stretching from Hudson Bay to the eastern slopes of the Rocky Mountains and trading hub of Hudson's Bay Company. Furs from Great Slave Lake were traded at Norway House for goods such as metal and cloth from England. By 1875 there were 800 Cree people—mainly from the Hayes and Nelson River systems—living at the Norway House settlement with hundreds employed by the HBC. By the 1870s, the natural resources area around Norway House had been depleted and the Hudson's Bay Company scaled back its operations. In 1869 the Government of Canada took over the vast area controlled by the HBC.

=== From York boats to steamboats ===
In the 1870s, when the Hudson's Bay Company replaced York boats with steamboat transportation on Lake Winnipeg, the 200 Cree who operated the York boats in the inland waterways for the HBC lost their jobs.

=== Rossville mission ===
In 1840 the Methodists established the Rossville mission—the first Methodist mission station West of Lake Superior in British North America—and by 1875 most Christian Crees lived near the Rossville mission. It was established in 1810 on the eastern channel of the Nelson River just below the northern outlet of Lake Winnipeg.' Six years later, it had grown into a village, consisting of about thirty houses and a church. In the 1870s As the economic situation deteriorated for the Rossville Cree, local missionaries encouraged them to locate further inland on lands more favourable for agriculture and other traditional activities. HBC Chief Factor Roderick Ross reported to James A. Graham that during the 1870s the village of Rossville was in a chronic state of starvation and needed assistance from the HBC Post. This situation was relieved only when its "surplus population" of 180 Cree moved to Fisher River in 1877 and 1888. The HBC earned $1000 in revenue by assisting with the move.

== Treaty 5 ==
In 1874, representatives of the Christian Indians of Rossville, led by Chief David Rundle, wrote the federal government requesting support to move to their southernmost hunting region around Grassy Narrows and the present day White Mud River.

Southern hunting region

"In 1874, Chief David Rundle and a group of Rossville maskekomowak wrote to Lieutenant-Governor Alexander Morris stating their intention to and requesting assistance to relocate further south to Grassy Narrows/White Mud River region on the western shore of Lake Winnipeg. They had family there already, and the land and fisheries were good."

In the summer of 1875 they were denied because the land was being reserved for an Icelandic settlement. The government instead offered them land at the mouth of the Fisher River. Unlike other Treaty No.5 bands who received 160 acres per family, Fisher River only received 100 acres per family.

In 1875, the Government of Canada had granted a 57.9 kilometres (36.0 mi) strip of land along the western shore of Lake Winnipeg between Boundary Creek and White Mud River inclusive of Hecla Island to Icelandic immigrants who established a settlement in what is now Gimli in the fall of 1875. A severe smallpox epidemic erupted in 1876 originating from the second wave of hundreds of Icelandic settlers resulting in hundreds of deaths as it quickly spread to the indigenous First Nation population including the nearby Sandy Bar Band first nation community at Riverton. The newly formed Council of Keewatin imposed severe restrictions on the fur trade with furs and trading posts burnt to prevent the spread of smallpox and no possibility of compensation. The epidemic and quarantine postponed the move until the summer of 1877 when 43 families—representing 200 people made the 200 mile journey south to the present day Fisher River Reserve.

"Treaty No.5 was negotiated at Norway House on September 24, 1875 by Chief David Rundle and Councillors James Cochrane, Harry Constatag (Koostatak) and Charles Pisequinip on behalf of the Norway House Band. Charles Pisequinip remained in Norway House when the rest relocated to Fisher River." Then-Lieutenant Governor Alexander Morris represented the Queen in signing Treaty 5 with the Saulteaux and Swampy Cree non-treaty band governments and peoples around Lake Winnipeg in the District of Keewatin.^{[D]} The Christian Indians of Rossville under David Rundle were granted the land on the present reserve at Fisher River.

Upon arrival on the reserve lands "the people built homes and divided up the land to be used for farming...In addition to farming, the people took part in the seasonal labour provided by the fishing and lumber industries.2 Throughout the 1880s many more families from northern Manitoba joined the original settlers.3 In 1908, the band signed the adhesions to Treaty Number Five which brought more people into the band."

== Culture ==
Fisher River Cree Nation cultural activities used to include family oriented activities such as dancing, square dances, jigging, fiddling, sports events, and movie nights.

=== Treaty days ===
Historically, on treaty days, each person would receive five dollars as well as food supplies from the federal government. Families would gather by the Fisher River and camp in large canvas trappers' tents. Treaty day activities included sports competitions and games, trade booths, and dances. "Treaty days were the most anticipated recreational event of the year. When families came together to share and celebrate it created a strong community atmosphere."

=== Pow wow ===
Fisher River holds an annual Ada Wilson "Grey Cloud Woman" Memorial Pow Wow in August "with dancers from across North America in a large arbour beautifully constructed from logs. The pow wow was renamed in 2006 to honour Ada Wilson, a well respected community member."

== Past chiefs ==
- David Rundle: Treaty 5 Signatory 1875
- John Cochrane: 1905–1917
- Joseph Everett: 1917–1921
- Moses McKay: 1921–1922
- Daniel Cochrane: 1922–1925
- James Murdock: 1926–1931
- Jeremiah Rundle: 1931–1937
- James Murdock: 1938–1940
- Alex Hudson: 1940–1945

Before the election of 1945, previous lists are read to the best understanding.

- James Murdock: 1945–1953
- Charles Sinclair: 1953–1959
- Solomon Mallett: 1959–1963
- George Sinclair: 1963–1965
- Isaac Cochrane: 1965–1967
- Solomon Mallett: 1967–1969
- Charles Sinclair: 1969–1973
- Wesley Hart: 1973–1989
- David Crate: 1989–1991
- Lorne Cochrane: 1991–1995
- David Crate: 1995–2001
- Sam Murdock: 2001–2003
- David Crate: 2003–present

== Notable people ==
- KC Adams, mixed-media artist
- Jeffrey Ansloos, Cree scholar, Indigenous psychologist, researcher of Indigenous youth suicide, and children's book author
- Verna Kirkness CM OM (born 1935 Fisher River Cree Nation, scholar and Indigenous language advocate
- Stan McKay, Christian clergy, first Indigenous moderator of the United Church of Canada
- Kent Monkman (born 13 November 1965, St Marys, ON), visual and performance artist

== Notes ==
Fisher River Cree Nation has a radio station that operates a First Nations Community radio programming at 103.5 FM with the call sign CJFR-FM.

== See also ==
- Fisher River Hawks
