= Selkirk Fishermen =

Junior ice hockey club

- City: Selkirk, Manitoba
- League: CRJHL
- Founded: 1917
- Home arena: Selkirk Recreation Complex
- Colours
- Website: selkirkjrbfishermen.ca

The Selkirk Fishermen are a junior ice hockey club and franchise of the Capital Region Junior Hockey League (CRJHL). The team plays its home games at the Selkirk Recreation Complex in Selkirk, Manitoba.

== History ==
The Fishermen won the Abbott Cup in 1920, making them the Junior Champion for Western Canada and earning a playoff against the George Richardson Memorial Trophy winning Eastern Champion for the Memorial Cup. The Fishermen lost the Memorial Cup competition against the Toronto Canoe Club Paddlers.

Since 1978, the Fishermen have won a province-leading 11 Baldy Northcott Trophy championships as Manitoba Junior B champions.

In 1983, the Fishermen made history in Portage la Prairie, Manitoba, by defeating the Saskatoon Wesleys of the North Saskatchewan Junior B Hockey League to win the inaugural Keystone Cup championship. To this day, they are one of only two champions to have ever come out of Manitoba.

Keystone Junior Hockey League statistics
Season	GP	W	L	T	OTL	Pts	GF	GA	PCT	Finish	Playoffs
2004–05	36	26	10	0	0	52	182	96	.722	1st	Won Provincials; Keystone Cup: 4th in Round-robin; Lost Bronze medal game
2005–06	36	23	12	1	0	47	—	—	.653	1st	Lost in Provincial Finals
2006–07	40	30	8	0	2	62	185	122	.775	2nd	Lost in Provincial Finals
2007–08	40	26	11	2	1	55	217	94	.688	3rd	Lost in 1st round Hosted Western Canadian; Jr. B Championships; 3rd in Round-robin; Lost Bronze medal game
2008–09	36	24	10	0	2	50	168	117	.694	3rd	Lost in Provincial Finals
2009–10	32	29	3	0	0	58	201	98	.906	1st	Won Provincials; Keystone Cup: 5th
2010–11	32	24	7	0	1	49	197	74	—	1st of 8	Lost in semi-finals
2011–12	32	23	10	0	2	48	147	110	.667	2nd of 8	Lost in semi-finals
2012–13	36	23	11	0	2	48	163	99	.667	3rd of 9	Lost in finals
2013–14	34	25	7	0	2	52	176	116	.765	1st of 4, South; 2nd of 8, KJHL	KJHL Champions; Keystone Cup: 6th (0–5–0)
2014–15	32	24	7	0	1	49	204	97	.766	1st of 9	Won quarter-finals, 3–1 (Falcons); Won semi-finals, 4–0 (Warriors); Won League Finals, 4–3 (Juniors)
2015–16	34	26	6	0	2	54	140	94	.794	1st of 5, South; 3rd of 10, KJHL	Won Div Semi-finals, 3–0 (Ice Dawgs); Won Div. Finals, 4–2 (Warriors); Lost League Finals, 0–4 (Juniors)
2016–17	34	24	10	0	0	48	205	83	.706	2nd of 4, South; 4th of 10, KJHL	Lost quarter-finals, 1–3 (Juniors)
2017–18	34	28	3	0	3	59	163	88	.868	1st of 4, South; 1st of 10, KJHL	Won quarter-finals, 3–0 (Islanders); Lost semi-finals, 3-4 (Warriors)

The team was a member of the Keystone Junior Hockey League until 2018. For the 2018-19 season the Fishermen were one of five teams that departed the Keystone Junior Hockey League and established the Capital Region Junior Hockey League. In the initial season the Fishermen became the first league and playoff champions.

Capital Region Junior Hockey League statistics
Season	GP	W	L	T	OTW	OTL	Pts	GF	GA	Pct	Finish	Playoffs
2018–19	32	20	7	1	3	1	68	157	94	0.708	1st of 5 CRJHL	won Semifinals, 4-3 (Falcons); Won League Finals, 4-2 (Satelites); CGJHL CHAMPIONS
2019–20	32	23	5	0	2	2	75	153	72	0.781	1st of 5 CRJHL	won Semifinals, 4-1 (Ice Dawgs): League Finals, 0-0 (Warriors); Playoff cancelled
2020–21	5	4	0	0	0	1	14	18	6	0.933	1st of 5 CRJHL	Cancelled
2021–22	32	27	3	0	1	1	83	158	54	0.865	1st of 5 CRJHL	won Semifinals, 4-0 (Falcons); Won League Finals, 4-0 (Ice Dawgs); Capital Region Champions
2022–23	30	24	4	0	1	1	73	124	48	0.822	1st of 6 CRJHL	won Semifinals, 4-0 (Falcons); Won League Finals, 4-1 (Warriors); Capital Region Champions (x3)
2023–24	30	20	5	2	1	2	66	123	71	0.733	1st of 6 CRJHL	Lost Semifinals, 1-4 (Comets)
2024–25	30	12	14	0	1	3	66	104	100	0.456	5th of 7 CRJHL	Won Quarterfinals, 3-1 (Habs); Lost Semifinals, 1-4 (Warriors)
2025–26	30	17	10	0	1	2	55	123	98	0.611	3rd of 7 CRJHL	Won Quarterfinals, 3-2 (Falcons); Won Semifinals, 4-1 (Comets); Lost League Finals, 1-4 (Habs)

== Regional championships ==
Western Canadian Jr. B Championships (Northern Ontario to British Columbia)
Six teams in round-robin play. 1st vs. 2nd for gold/silver & 3rd vs. 4th for bronze.

Year	Round-robin	Record	Standing	Bronze Medal Game	Gold Medal Game
1983	vs. Thunder Bay vs. Saskatoon vs. Portage la Prairie	Data missing		—	KEYSTONE CHAMPIONS
1994	W, Kinistino, 4–2; T, Westfort, 3–3; T, Fort William, 6–6; W, North Okanagan, 6–3; W, Sherwood Park	3–0–2	1st of 6	—	L, Kinistino, 3–5; Silver Medal
1999	W, Hearst, 4–3; L, Assiniboia, 1–14; L, Edmonton, 4–9; L, Campbell River, 1–17; L, Fort William	1–3–0	5th of 6	—	—
2003	T, St. Claude, 2–2; W, Nipigon, 9–3; T, Assiniboia, 4–4; W, Spruce Grove, 5–4; L, Richmond, 0–5	2–1–2	4th of 6	L, Richmond, 4–9	—
2005	W, Thunder Bay, 4–1; L, Osoyoos, 4–7; L, Medicine Hat, 2–4; T, Calgary; W, Saskatoon	2–2–1	4th of 6	OTL, Medicine Hat, 2–3	—
2010	L, Tri-Town, 0–1; W, Revelstoke, 3–1; L, Abbotsford, 5–7; T, Thunder Bay, 6–6; L, Kamloops, 1–7	1–3–1	5th of 6	—	—
2014	L, Thunder Bay, 1–2; L, Saskatoon, 0–3; L, Abbotsford, 5–7; L, Beaver Valley, 0–3; L, Blackfalds, 3–6	0–5–0	6th of 6	—	—
2015	T, Thunder Bay Northern Hawks, 3–3; L, Saskatoon Quakers, 1–4; L, Cold Lake Ice, 0–10; L, North Edmonton Red Wings, 1–7; L, Campbell River Storm, 1–6	0–4–1	6th of 6	—	—
