= OCN Storm =

Junior ice hockey club

- City: Opaskwayak Cree Nation
- League: KJHL
- Founded: 2012
- Home arena: Gordon Lathlin Memorial
- Colours
- General manager: Alan Burrell
- Head coach: Ethan Constant

Championships
- League: 2025; 2026
- Regional: 2023

The OCN Storm Junior B Hockey Club is a junior ice hockey club and franchise of the Keystone Junior Hockey League (KJHL). The team plays its home games at the Gordon Lathlin Memorial Centre in Opaskwayak Cree Nation.

== History ==
OCN Storm were founded in 2012. In their inaugural season, the Storm won just two games out of 36, finishing last in the league standings, thus missing the playoffs. The following season they improved their record to 12–21–0–1, finishing third in the new four-team North Division. They fell in the first round of the playoffs being swept by the Arborg Ice Dawgs.

In their third season of 2014–15 the Storm finished fifth in the league and won their first-ever playoff series against the North Winnipeg Satelites. OCN was eliminated in the second round by the Peguis Juniors.

The league again split into two divisions for 2015–16 season. OCN Storm met up with the Juniors in a rematch of the previous season, coming out short dropping the series 4 games to 2.

In the 2016–17 season the Storm clinched the newly realigned North Division. After eliminating the Cross Lake Islanders in four games OCN were knocked out in the second round by the Central Division winner Arborg Ice Dawgs.

The Storm repeated as North Division champs in 2017–18, but were eliminated by the Arborg Ice Dawgs in the quarterfinal.

In the 2018–19 season the OCN Storm were one of the four active teams in the Keystone Junior Hockey League. The Storm finished second in the league, but were upset in the semifinals by the Peguis Juniors losing the series 3 games to 2.

In the 2024–25 season the OCN Storm finished fourth in the league and upset the Peguis Juniors in 4 games.

Statistics
Season	GP	W	L	T	OTL	Pts	GF	GA	Finish	Playoffs
2012–13	36	2	33	0	1	5	91	280	9th of 9	Did not qualify
2013–14	34	12	21	0	1	25	126	204	3rd of 4, North 6th of 8, KJHL	Lost division semifinals, 0–3 (Ice Dawgs)
2014–15	32	19	13	0	0	38	136	121	5th of 9	Won quarterfinals, 3–1 (Satelites); Lost semifinals, 1–4 (Juniors)
2015–16	34	26	6	0	1	53	271	123	2nd of 5, North; 2nd of 10, KJHL	Won division semifinals, 3–1 (Islanders); Lost division finals, 2–4 (Juniors)
2016–17	34	22	9	0	3	47	318	204	1st of 3, North; 3rd of 10, KJHL	Won quarterfinals, 3–1 (Islanders); Lost semifinals, 1–4 (Ice Dawgs)
2017–18	34	25	6	0	3	53	274	136	1st of 3, North; 3rd of 10, KJHL	Lost quarterfinals, 1–3 (Warriors)
2018–19	28	19	9	0	0	38	180	126	2nd of 4	Lost semifinals, 2–3 (Juniors)
2019–20	34	20	12	0	0	40	231	179	2nd of 5, KJHL	Cancelled
2020–21	Season cancelled									
2021–22	32	16	14	0	2	34	173	179	3rd of 5, KJHL	Lost Semi Finals, 0-2 (Flames)
2022–23	34	25	8	0	1	51	212	156	1st of 6, KJHL	Won Semi Finals, 3-2 (Flames); Lost League Finals, 1-4 (Peguis Juniors) (Advance to Central Canada Cup; Regular Season Champs)
2023–24	36	19	15	0	2	40	231	189	5th of 7, KJHL	Lost Quarterdinals, 1-2 (Islanders)North Stars
2024–25	34	15	17	0	2	32	168	163	4th of 5, KJHL	Won Quarterdinals, 2-0(Islanders); Won Semifinals 3-1 (Flames); Won League Finals 3-1 (Peguis Juniors) (Advance to Central Canada Cup)
2025–26	34	25	5	1	3	53	195	127	1st of 5, KJHL	Won Semifinals 3-0 (Islanders); Won League Finals 4-2 (North Stars) (Advance to Central Canada Cup)

== Regional championships ==
Year	Round-robin	Record	Standing	Semifinal game	Championship game
2023	L, Thunder Bay Northern Hawks, 1-3; T, Schrieber Falcons, 2-2; L, Peguis Juniors, 1-6	0–2–1	4th of 4	W, Peguis Juniors, 7-1	W, Schrieber Falcons 6-3; Central Canada Champions
2025	W, Wetaskiwin Icemen, 7-5; L, St. Paul Canadiens, 3-6; L, Current River Storm, 1-9; L, Saskatoon Royals, 3-8	1–0-3	5th of 5	did not qualify	did not qualify
2026	OTW, Current River Storm, 4-3; OTL, Saskatoon Royals, 5-6; L, Wetaskiwin Icemen, 3-5; L, Regina Capitals , 8-10	0–2-2	5th of 5	did not qualify	did not qualify

== See also ==
- List of ice hockey teams in Manitoba

== Sources ==
- "KJHL Stats 2024–25". www.eliteprospects.com.
- "Keystone Junior 'B' Hockey League". www.keystonejr.ca.
