= Cross Lake Islanders =

- City: Cross Lake, Manitoba
- League: Keystone Junior Hockey League
- Division: North
- Founded: 2006
- Home arena: Cross Lake Sports Complex
- Colours: Black, orange, white
- Owner: Pimicikamak Okimawin
- General manager: Vaughn Blacksmith
- Head coach: Dennis Trout

The Cross Lake Islanders are a junior "B" ice hockey team based in Cross Lake, Manitoba. They are members of the Keystone Junior Hockey League (KJHL). The Islanders compete out of the Cross Lake Sports Arena, a 1,200-seat facility.

== History ==
Originally formed in 2006, the Islanders ceased operations after four seasons in the KJHL. The team struggled to be competitive in each of its first four seasons, winning just 22 games.

After a five-year hiatus, the club returned to the league in 2015. Former Islanders player Harley Garrioch, who played college hockey at Neumann University in Philadelphia, returned home to lead the club.

== Season-by-season ==
Note: GP = Games played, W = Wins, L = Losses, T = Ties, OTL = Overtime Losses, Pts = Points, GF = Goals for, GA = Goals against

Season	GP	W	L	T	OTL	GF	GA	Pts	Finish	Playoffs
2006–07	40	6	32	1	1	14	191	343	9th	Did not qualify
2007–08	40	7	30	0	3	17	184	378	8th	Lost quarterfinals
2008–09	36	7	25	0	4	18	158	263	8th	Lost quarterfinals
2009–10	32	2	30	0	0	4	116	401	8th	Lost quarterfinals
2015–16	34	15	19	0	0	30	224	216	3rd of 5, North; 7th of 10, KJHL	Lost semifinals, 1–3 (Storm)
2016–17	34	18	15	0	1	37	199	185	2nd of 3, North; 6th of 10, KJHL	Lost quarterfinals, 1–3 (Storm)
2017–18	34	13	20	0	1	27	210	210	2nd of 3, North; 8th of 10, KJHL	Lost quarterfinals, 0–3 (Fishermen)
2018–19	28	21	6	0	1	43	230	157	1st of 4, KJHL	Won semifinals, 3-0 (North Stars); Lost finals 3-4 (Juniors)
2019–20	32	16	16	0	0	32	198	205	4 of 5, KJHL	Won quarterfinals, 2-0 (North Stars); Playoffs cancelled due to COVID
2020–21	Season lost due to COVID-19 pandemic									
2021–22	32	7	22	0	3	17	147	284	5 of 5, KJHL	Lost quarterfinals, 0-2 (North Stars)
2022–23	34	5	27	0	2	12	153	283	6 of 6, KJHL	Lost play in, 0-2 (Selects)
2023–24	36	15	18	0	3	33	144	180	4 of 7, KJHL	Won quarterfinals, 2-1 (Storm); Lost semifinals 2-3 (Juniors)
2024–25	34	12	17	2	3	27	135	176	5 of 5, KJHL	Lost play in, 0-3 (Storm)
2025–26	34	6	26	0	2	14	143	205	5 of 5, KJHL	Won play in, 2-1 (Flames); Lost semifinals, lost 0-3 (Storm)

== Coaches ==
- Angus McDonald
- Nigel Sette
- Morgan Blacksmith
- Harley Garrioch
- Trent Spence
- Jeff Monias
- Dennis Trout
