= Peguis Juniors =

Junior ice hockey team

- League: KJHL
- Founded: 1994
- Home arena: Peguis Multiplex
- Colours
- Head coach: Marty Favel
- Website: peguisjuniors.wordpress.com

Franchise history
- 1994–2006: Peguis Juniors
- 2006–2009: Two Nations River Hawks
- 2009–present: Peguis Juniors

Championships
- League champions: 10

The Peguis Juniors are a junior "B" ice hockey team based in Peguis, Manitoba. They are members of the Keystone Junior Hockey League (KJHL). The franchise was founded in 1994.

== History ==
In 2006, Fisher River Cree Nation partnered with Peguis for three seasons. The team was renamed Two Nations River Hawks.

The Juniors played in the Peguis Arena, but on the early morning of February 19, 2007, the arena was lost to fire. After the fire the Juniors looked for a new arena to play their home games and from 2007 to 2011 the team played all their home games at the Fisher Branch Arena in Fisher Branch, Manitoba. In 2011–12 season, they played all their home games in Fisher River, Manitoba, at the Fisher River Arena.

== Season-by-season records ==
Note: GP = Games played, W = Wins, L = Losses, T = Ties, OTL = Overtime Losses, Pts = Points, GF = Goals for, GA = Goals against

Manitoba Junior B Hockey League
Season	GP	W	L	T	OTL	Pts	GF	GA	Finish	Playoffs
1994-95	34	22	12	0	0	45	205	174	5th	Quarterfinal Loss
1995-96	32	25	7	0	0	51	238	156	2nd	Champion
1996-97	32	22	8	2	0	46	301	175	2nd	Final Loss
1997–98	32	27	5	0	0	54	239	137	1st	Champion
1998–99	32	17	14	1	0	35	204	177	4th	Quarterfinal Loss
1999–00	32	19	12	1	0	39	207	183	3rd	Quarterfinal Loss
2000–01	36	24	11	0	1	49	200	163	3rd	Semifinal Loss
2001–02	36	21	14	0	1	43	199	157	3rd	Semifinal Loss
2002–03	32	18	12	1	1	38	183	131	4th	Semifinal Loss
2003–04	33	19	13	0	1	39	161	123	3rd	Season Cancelled

Keystone Junior Hockey League
Season	GP	W	L	T	OTL	Pts	GF	GA	Finish	Playoffs
2004–05	36	17	14	0	5	39	191	192	4th	Lost semifinals
2005–06	36	17	18	0	1	35	—	—	5th	Lost semifinals
2006–07	40	19	19	—	2	40	198	229	5th	Lost semifinals
2007–08	40	16	24	0	0	32	175	219	7th	Lost quarterfinals
2008–09	36	12	17	0	7	31	138	160	6th	Lost quarterfinals
2009–10	32	21	10	—	1	43	196	147	3rd	Lost semifinals
2010–11	32	16	10	1	5	38	184	144	5th	Lost quarterfinals
2011–12	36	17	16	0	3	37	172	188	5th	Lost quarterfinals
2012–13	36	33	2	0	1	67	282	128	1st	Won finals
2013–14	34	29	3	0	2	60	240	106	1st of 4, North; 1st of 8, KJHL	Lost divisional finals
2014–15	32	22	9	0	1	45	242	156	2nd of 9	Won quarterfinals, 3–1 (North Stars); Won semifinals, 4–0 (Storm); Lost finals, 3–4 (Fishermen)
2015–16	34	28	4	0	2	58	295	118	1st of 5, North; 1st of 10, KJHL	Won semifinals, 3–0 (North Stars); Won division finals, 4–2 (Storm); Won finals, 4–0 (Fishermen)
2016–17	34	23	10	0	1	47	248	164	2nd of 3, Central; 5th of 10, KJHL	Won quarterfinals, 3–1 (Fishermen); Won semifinals, 4–3 (Warriors); Won finals, 4–2 (Ice Dawgs)
2017–18	34	27	6	0	1	55	234	107	1st of 3, Central; 2nd of 10, KJHL	Won quarterfinals, 3–0 (Satelites); Won semifinals, 4–0 (Falcons); Won finals, 4–1 (Warriors)
2018–19	28	12	12	0	1	25	154	141	3rd of 4	Won semifinals, 4–1 (Storm); Won finals, 4–3 (Islanders)
2019–20	32	18	13	---	1	37	211	162	3rd of 5	Playoffs cancelled
2020–21	Season cancelled									
2021–22	32	26	5	0	1	53	268	147	1st of 5, KJHL	Won semifinals, 3–0 (North Stars); Won finals, 4-2 (Flames)
2022–23	34	24	9	0	1	49	211	135	2nd of 6, KJHL	Won semifinals, 3–0 (Selects); Won finals, 4-1 (Storm)
2023–24	36	29	5	0	2	60	267	176	1st of 7, KJHL	Won semifinals, 3-2 (Islanders); Won finals, 4-0 (PBCN Selects)
2024–25	34	18	14	0	2	38	166	163	3rd of 5, KJHL	Won semifinals, 3–0 (North Stars); Lost finals, 1-4 (OCN Storm)
2025–26	36	15	17	0	2	32	170	201	3rd of 5, KJHL	Lost semifinals, 1-3 (North Stars)

== Western Canadian Jr. B Championships ==
Keystone Cup
Year	Round-robin	Record	Standing	Bronze medal game	Gold medal game
2013	W, St. Malo Warriors, 10–4; L, Saskatoon Royals, 2–3; W, Thunder Bay Northern Hawks, 3–2; W, Okotoks Bisons, 5–3; L, Richmond Sockeyes, 1–8	3–2–0	3rd of 6	L, Okotoks Bisons, 4–11	—
2016	L, North Peace Navigators, 3–7; L, Regina Capitals, 5–9; L, Saskatoon Quakers, 2–9; L, 100 Mile House Wranglers, 3–9; W, Thunder Bay Northern Hawks, 8–4	1–5–0	5th of 6	—	—
2017	L, Arborg Ice Dawgs, 2–7; W, Nipigon Elks, 4–3; L, Regina Capitals, 0–10; T, Wainwright Bisons, 5–5; L, Beaver Valley Nitehawks, 2–8	1–5–1	5th of 6	—	—
2018	L, Thunder Bay Fighting Walleye, 2–7; L, Thunder Bay Northern Hawks, 5–6; W, St. Malo Warriors, 8–1	1–2–0	2nd of 4	W, Thunder Bay Fighting Walleye, 6–3	Lost Thunder Bay Northern Hawks 2–5; Silver medalists
CENTRAL CANADA CUP
Year	Round-robin	Record	Standing	Semifinal Game	Gold Medal Game
2023	W, Thunder Bay Northern Hawks, 15-0; W, Schrieber Falcons, 5-1; W, OCN Storm, 6-1	3–0–0	1st of 4	L, OCN Storm, 1-7	—
2024	L, St. Paul Canadiens, 5-2; L, Saskatoon Royals, 5-6; L, PBCN Selects, 2-4; L, Current River Storm, 2-6	0–4–0	5th of 5	—	—

== Franchise records ==
These are the top-ten point, goal, and assist scorers in franchise history.

Note: Pos = Position; GP = Games played; G = Goals; A = Assists; Pts = Points

Points
Player	GP	G	A	Pts
SPENCE, Tyrome	108	158	131	289
FLETT, Quinton	126	80	173	253
NEAULT, Waylon	164	131	117	248
MURDOCK, Lyle	87	122	122	244
GARSON, Mervin	125	107	134	241
KIRKNESS, Presley	117	84	132	216
McPHERSON, Brody	148	93	114	207
SUTHERLAND, Dwight	130	79	127	206
DANIELS, Ethan	79	88	99	187
COCHRANE, Ralph	130	44	142	186

Goals
Player	G
SPENCE, Tyrome	158
NEAULT, Waylon	131
MURDOCK, Lyle	122
GARSON, Mervin	107
McPHERSON, Brody	93
DANIELS, Ethan	88
McKAY, Tyler	86
KIRKNESS, Presley	84
FLETT, Quinton	80
SUTHERLAND, Dwight	79

Assists
Player	A
FLETT, Quinton	173
COCHRANE, Ralph	142
GARSON, Mervin	134
KIRKNESS, Presley	132
SPENCE, Tyrome	131
SUTHERLAND, Dwight	127
MURDOCK, Lyle	122
NEAULT, Waylon	117
McPherson, Brody	114
SUTHERLAND, Spencer	111

=== Single-season leaders ===
- Most goals in a season: Tyrome Spence, 74 (2019-20)
- Most assists in a season: Ethan Daniels, 65 (2019-20)
- Most points in a season: Tyrome Spence, 121 (2019-20)
- Most penalty minutes in a season: Brody McPherson, 217 (2024-25)
- Most goals in a season, defenceman: Joseph Sutherland, 21 (2014–15)
- Most points in a season, defenceman: Joseph Sutherland, 46 (2014–15) Ralph Cochrane, 46 (2013-14)
- Most wins in a season: Keifer Tacan, 26 (2015-16)
- Most shutouts in a season: Bobby Lavis, 5

=== Team captains ===
- Quinton Flett, 2019-2020
- Devon Garson, 2016-2017
- Ralph Cochrane, 2013-2014
- Spencer Sutherland, 2012-2013
- Jarrett Cochrane, 2011–2012
- Derrick Sinclair, 2009–2011
- Neil Stevenson, 2007–2008
- Mervin Garson, 2004–2007
- Allan Thompson 1999–2004

=== Head coaches ===
- Marty Favel
- Jason Smith
- Michael Spence 2016–2020
- Farron Cochrane 2004–2016
