= Norway House North Stars =

Ice hockey team in Manitoba, Canada

Norway House North Star
- City: Norway House, Manitoba
- League: Keystone Junior Hockey League
- Founded: 1991
- Home arena: Kinosao Sipi Multiplex
- Colours: Black, Yellow, green, white
- Owner: Norway House Cree Nation
- General manager: Skylar Tait-Reaume
- Head coach: Skylar Tait-Reaume
- Media: Nomvd Media

Franchise history
- 1991–present: Norway House North Stars

Championships
- League champions: 1

The Norway House North Stars are a junior "B" ice hockey team based in Norway House, Manitoba. They are the oldest members of the Keystone Junior Hockey League (KJHL).

== History ==
The franchise was founded in 1991 and competed in the Northwest Junior Hockey League. The North Stars captured eight (1992, 1993, 1994, 1996, 1997, 2000, 2001, 2004) NJHL championships in 13 seasons of the league before joining the KJHL for the 2004–05 season.

Brady Keeper played one season (2012–13) with the North Stars as a 16-year old. Keeper would advance to play three seasons with the OCN Blizzard then two seasons at the University of Maine. On March 18, 2019 Keeper signed an entry-level contract with the Florida Panthers.

== Season-by-season record ==
Note: GP = Games played, W = Wins, L = Losses, T = Ties, OTL = Overtime Losses, Pts = Points, GF = Goals for, GA = Goals against

Season	GP	W	L	T	OTL	Pts	GF	GA	Finish	Playoffs
2000–01	24	18	6	0	---	36	168	91	1st of 3	Won Finals, 4–2 vs NCN Flames
2001–02	24	17	7	0	0	34	210	138	2nd of 4	Won Semifinals, 3–1 vs OCN Storm Lost Finals, 1–4 vs NCN Flames
2002–03	23	18	5	0	0	36	221	112	1st of 5	Won Semifinals, 3–0 vs Cross Lake Islanders Lost Finals, 0–4 vs NCN Flames
2003–04	31	28	2	0	1	57	279	118	1st of 5	Won Semifinals, 3–0 vs Cross Lake Islanders Won Finals, 4–0 vs NCN Flames
2004–05	36	24	11	1	0	49	178	134	3rd of 7	Won Quarterfinals, 2–0 vs North Winnipeg Satelites Lost Semifinals, 1–4 vs St. Malo Warriors
2005–06	36	19	16	1	0	39	—	—	4th of 7	Lost Quarterfinals, 0–3 vs Peguis Juniors
2006–07	40	15	22	0	3	33	192	228	8th of 9	Lost Quarterfinals, 3–4 vs Winnipeg Saints
2007–08	40	24	13	2	1	51	207	154	4th of 8	Won Quarterfinals, 3–1 vs St. Boniface Seals Won Semifinals, 4–1 vs Arborg Ice Dawgs Won Finals, 3–2 vs St. Malo Warriors
2008–09	36	19	17	0	0	38	176	215	5th of 8	Lost Quarterfinals, 0–3 vs St. Malo Warriors
2009–10	32	14	13	0	5	33	207	169	6th of 8	Lost Quarterfinals, 2–3 vs Peguis Juniors
2010–11	32	18	11	1	2	39	192	135	4th of 8	Won Quarterfinals, 3–2 vs Peguis Juniors Won Semifinals, 4–2 vs Selkirk Fishermen Lost Finals, 1–4 vs Arborg Ice Dawgs
2011–12	36	21	14	0	1	43	184	149	3rd of 8	Won Quarterfinals, 3–1 vs Lundar Falcons Won Semifinals, 4–2 vs Selkirk Fishermen Lost Finals, 0–2* vs Arborg Ice Dawgs
2012–13	36	11	24	0	1	23	175	274	7th of 9	Lost Quarterfinals vs Arborg Ice Dawgs
2013–14	34	6	25	0	3	15	142	255	4th of 4, North; 7th of 8, KJHL	Lost Div. Semifinals, 0–3 vs Peguis Juniors
2014–15	32	13	17	0	2	36	163	206	7th of 9	Lost Quarterfinals, 1–3 vs Peguis Juniors
2015–16	34	1	33	0	0	1	90	393	5th of 5, North; 10th of 10, KJHL	Won Survivor Series, 2–1 Fisher Ruver Hawks; Lost Div. Semifinals, 0–3 vs Peguis Juniors
2016–17	34	2	32	0	0	4	94	405	3rd of 3, North; 10th of 10, KJHL	Did not qualify
2017–18	34	6	27	0	1	13	113	327	3rd of 3, North; 10th of 10, KJHL	Did not qualify
2018–19	28	4	24	0	0	8	104	244	4th of 4	Lost Semifinals, 0–3 vs Peguis Juniors
2019–20	32	3	28	0	1	7	106	330	5th of 5	Lost 1st Round, 0–2 vs Cross Lake Islanders
2020–21	season lost due to covid									
2021–22	32	10	21	0	1	20	162	217	4th 5, KJHL	Won QuarterFinals 2-0, (Islanders); Lost SemiFinals 0-3 (Juniors)
2022–23	34	11	20	0	3	25	214	259	5th 6, KJHL	Lost QuarterFinals 0-2, (Flames)
2023–24	36	16	20	0	0	32	188	212	6th 7, KJHL	Lost QuarterFinals 0-2 (Flames)
2024–25	34	15	15	0	4	34	167	184	3rd 5, KJHL	Lost SemiFinals 0-4 (Juniors)
2025–26	34	25	9	0	0	50	195	127	2nd 5, KJHL	Won SemiFinals 4-0 (Juniors); Lost League Finals 2-4 (Storm)

* = forfeited series after refusing to play home games at a neutral site

== Keystone Cup ==
Western Canadian Jr. B Championships (Northern Ontario to British Columbia)
Six teams in round-robin play. 1st vs. 2nd for gold/silver & 3rd vs. 4th for bronze.

Year	Round-robin	Record	Standing	Bronze medal game	Gold medal game
2008	L, Selkirk Fishermen, 0–3; W, Thunder Bay Wolverines, 5–1; T, Pilot Butte Storm, 5–5; W, Sherwood Park Knights, 4–3; W, Grandview Steelers, 2–1	3–1–1	2nd of 6	—	L, Sherwood Park Knights, 3–5; Silver Medal
