= T.G. Smith Arena =

Ice hockey arena in Steinbach, Manitoba

Coordinates: 49.5270°N 96.6815°W

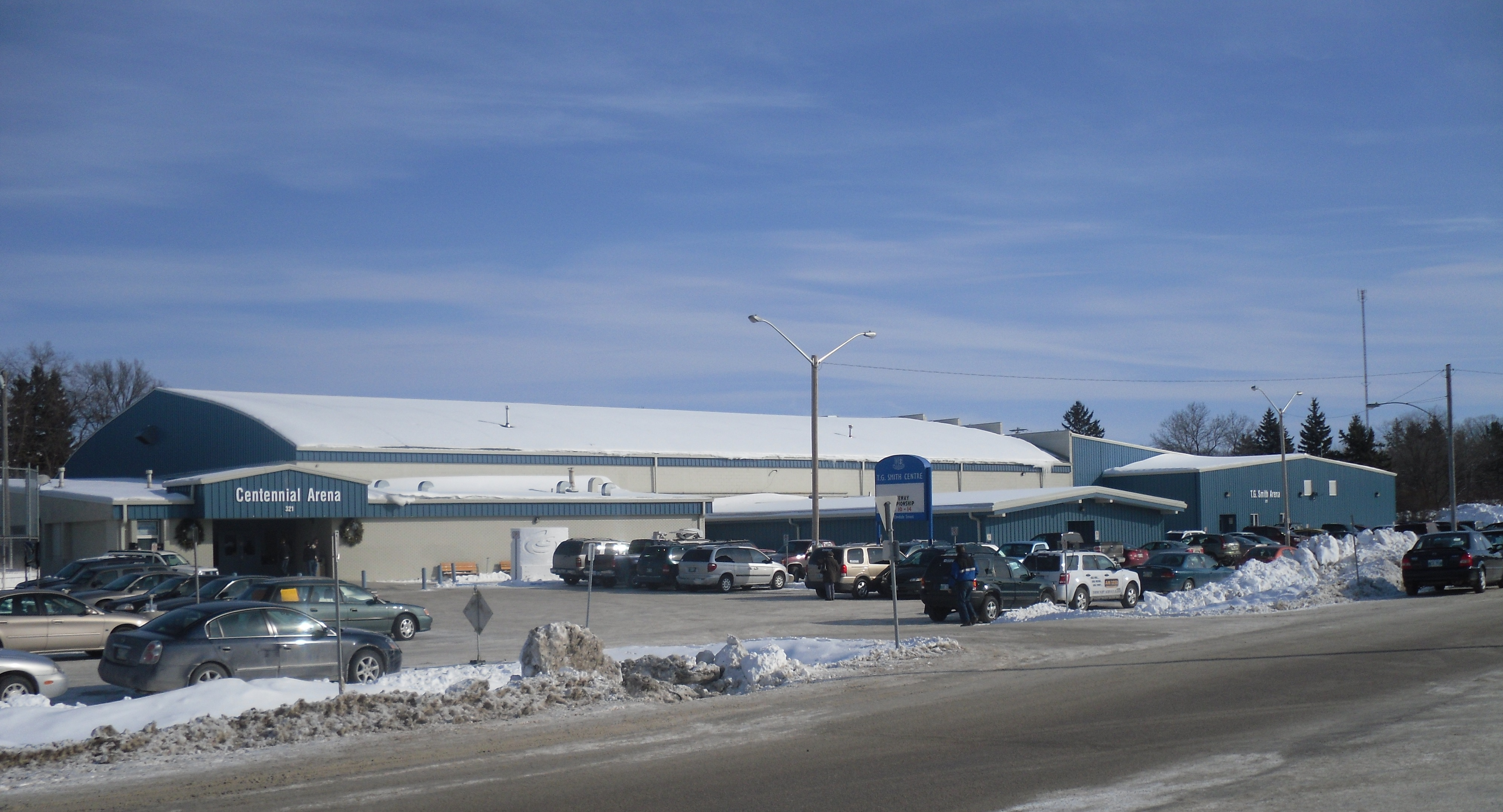
- Former Centennial Arena (left) and the T.G. Smith Arena on the right coloured blue.
- Interactive map of T.G. Smith Arena
- Former names: Steinbach Centennial Arena (1967-1995); T.G. Smith Centre (1995-2023)
- Location: 321 Elmdale Street; Steinbach, Manitoba R5G 0E8; Canada
- Operator: City of Steinbach
- Capacity: 300

Construction
- Opened: 1967
- Expanded: 1995
- Demolished: 2023 (partial)

Tenants
- Steinbach Huskies (HTHL/CASHL/MEHL/CSHL) 1967-present; Steinbach Jr. Huskies (HTJHL) 1987-present; Steinbach Pistons (MJHL) 2009-2023; SRSS Sabres (WHSHL) 2013-present; East Steinbach Eagles (HTHL) 1967-1987; Steinbach Millers (MJBHL) 1974-1983; Steinbach Hawks (MJHL) 1985-1988; Eastman Selects (MMAAAHL) 1997-2009; South East Prairie Thunder (Sr. AAA) 2006-2016; Steinbach North Stars (Sr. AAA) 2007-2010

Website
- www.steinbach.ca

The T.G. Smith Arena is an ice hockey arena in Steinbach, Manitoba, Canada It is adjacent to the site of the Southeast Event Centre, which opened in 2025. The Steinbach Curling Club is also adjacent to the arena.

== History ==
Prior to 2023, the T.G. Smith Arena was part of the T.G. Smith Centre. The original part of the complex was the Steinbach Centennial Arena, opened in 1967 and accommodated up to 1,250 spectators (seated and standing room combined). A second indoor rink was constructed in the mid-1990s after which the entire complex was named after the T.G. Smith Centre, after a local banker and supporter of local sport programs. The Centennial Arena was demolished in June 2023 to make way for the new Southeast Events Centre, leaving the existing arena as the remaining part of the complex. It has a capacity of approximately 300.

The T.G. Smith Centre was the home of the Steinbach Pistons of the Manitoba Junior Hockey League from 2009 to 2023 and the Steinbach Huskies junior and senior hockey teams. The T.G. Smith Arena continues to host the community's minor hockey, ringette, and figure skating programs.

== Events ==
In Senior 'AAA' hockey, the T.G. Smith Centre played host to two Allan Cup national senior "AAA" championships: the Steinbach North Stars, active from 2007 to 2010, hosted the 2009 event, while the South East Prairie Thunder hosted in 2016. It also hosted the ninth place game of the 2002 World Under-17 Hockey Challenge, in which Germany defeated Finland. Aside from hockey, the T.G. Smith Centre has hosted two Manitoba Provincial Curling Championships (2006, 2010).

In March 2019, the T.G. Smith Centre hosted Rogers Hometown Hockey, the first time the program was hosted by a southeastern Manitoba community.

=== List of major events ===
- 1979 Allan Cup Western Canadian Finals
- 2002 Air Canada Cup Western Regional Championship
- 2006 Safeway Select
- 2009 Allan Cup
- 2010 Safeway Select
- 2013 Turnbull Cup Finals
- 2015 Turnbull Cup Finals
- 2016 Allan Cup
- 2016 Turnbull Cup Finals
- 2017 Telus Cup Western Regional Championship
- 2018 Esso Cup Western Regional Championship
- 2018 Turnbull Cup Finals
- 2018 ANAVET Cup
