= Mitchell, Manitoba =

Mitchell
- Local urban district
- Location of Mitchell in Manitoba
- Coordinates: 49°32′03″N 96°45′43″W
- Country: Canada
- Province: Manitoba
- Region: Eastman
- Rural Municipality: Hanover

Government
  - MP (Provencher): Ted Falk (CPC)
  - MLA (Steinbach): Kelvin Goertzen (PC)

Area
  - Total: 4.08 km^{2} (1.58 sq mi)
- Elevation: 268 m (879 ft)

Population (2021)
  - Total: 3,136
  - Density: 768.7/km^{2} (1,991/sq mi)
- Time zone: UTC-6 (CST)
  - Summer (DST): UTC-5 (CDT)

Mitchell is a local urban district and population centre located in the Rural Municipality of Hanover, Manitoba, Canada. It is located three kilometers west of Steinbach, Manitoba along Provincial Highway 52. The community has a population of 3,136 as of 2021, making Mitchell the 19th largest population centre in Manitoba.

== History ==
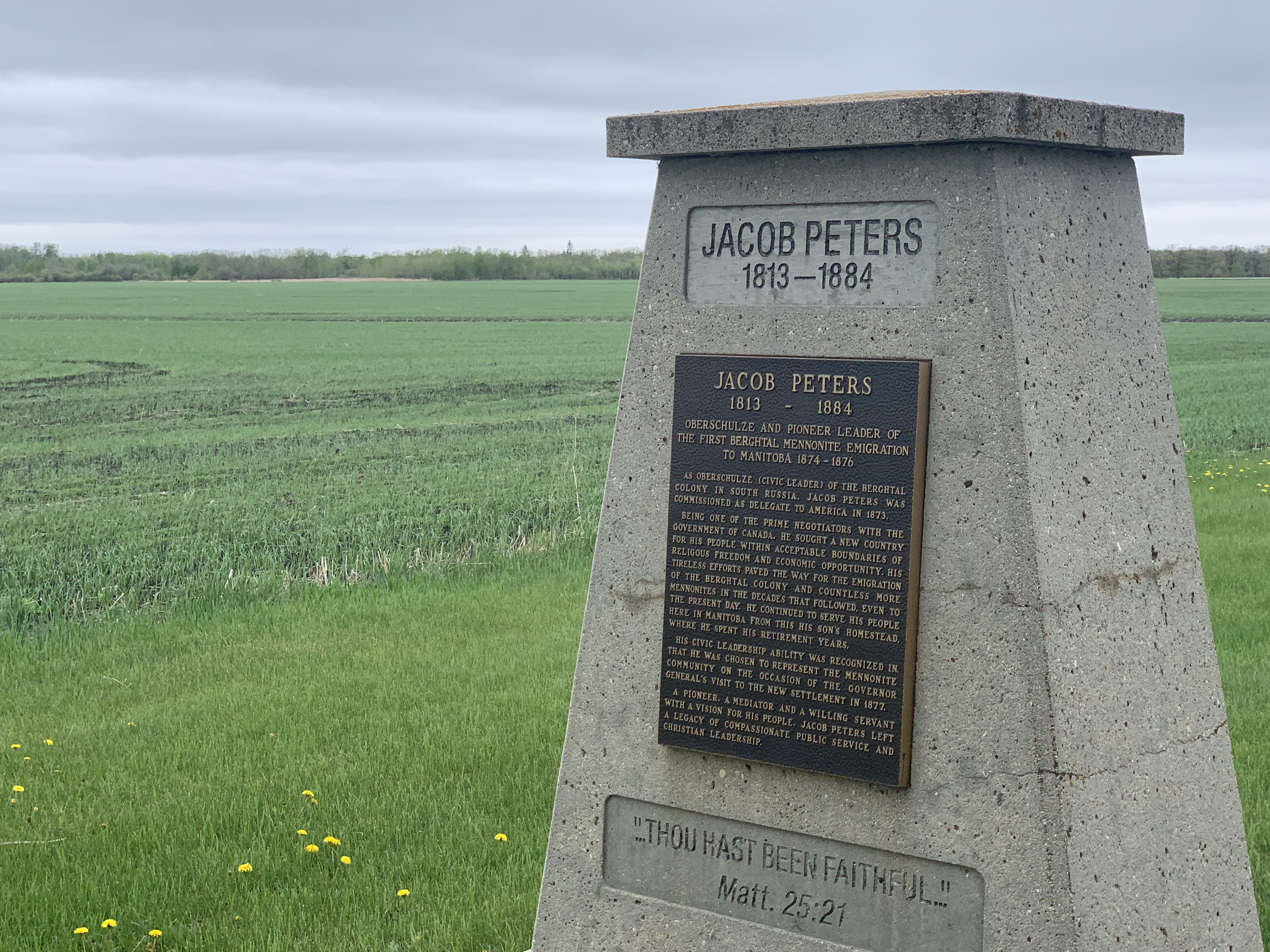
Cairn honouring oberschulz Jacob Peters at Vollwerk Cemetery in Mitchell

The area that is now known as Mitchell were originally lands of the nomadic Ojibway-speaking Anishinabe people. On 3 August 1871 the Anishinabe people signed Treaty 1 and moved onto reserves such as the Brokenhead Indian Reserve and Roseau River Anishinabe First Nation Reserve.

The area was then settled by Russian Mennonite settlers in the 1874. At that time there were dozens of villages in the East Reserve. Three of them, Vollwerk, Ebenfeld, and Reichenbach, were eventually absorbed into the new community of Mitchell, which was renamed after the surrounding school district established in 1919. The Canadian government deliberately chose English names for the school districts, such as Mitchell, Bothwell, Randolph and others in an attempt to assimilate the Mennonites into Canadian culture and eventually some of these communities, such as Mitchell, abandoned the original German names and adopted the new English names as their community names.

Vollwerk (which later became Mitchell) was the home of obserschulz (reeve) Jacob Peters, who led the Mennonite delegation to Canada and was a signatory of the Privilegium. A cairn and gravestone honouring him can be found at the historic Vollwerk Cemetery on Reichenbach Road in Mitchell. The Stahn family, who sold much of the land that would eventually become the modern day community of Mitchell, are also honoured at the Vollwerk Cemetery.

== Education ==
The Mitchell School District was established in 1919. A one-room schoolhouse served the community until the 1950s, when another room has added to handle increasing student enrollment. In 1968, the school district was dissolved and became part of the newly formed Hanover School Division, after which students from Mitchell were required to attend school in Steinbach. The school division has since constructed new elementary and middle schools in Mitchell and only high school students from the Mitchell area are presently required to attend school in Steinbach.

== Recreation ==
Mitchell has a full range of community-run recreational facilities, including an indoor arena, baseball fields, soccer pitches, and tennis courts.

The Mitchell Arena was built in 1979 and is home to community's ice hockey teams, nicknamed the Mitchell Mustangs, which play in various Eastman Minor Hockey leagues. The Mitchell Mustangs have been members of the Hanover Tache Junior Hockey League since 1987 and previously played in the Manitoba Junior 'B' Hockey League. The Mustangs has also fielded senior teams in the past that played in the Hanover-Tache and Carillon Senior Hockey Leagues.

== Businesses and services ==
Mitchell's close proximity to the city of Steinbach means residents mostly shop and conduct business at the latter. However, Mitchell does have several of its own businesses and services, such as a Co-op gas bar and convenience store, a second convenience store, a number of churches, an auto repair business, and an assortment of home-based business.

== Government ==
Mitchell is designated as a local urban district (LUD) within the Rural Municipality of Hanover whose administrative offices are located 1.5 kilometers east of the community. An elected LUD committee, consisting of three members plus the Ward 2 Councillor for Hanover, reports to the municipal council. The community and surrounding area is part of the Steinbach (provincial) and Provencher (federal) electoral districts.

== Demographics ==
Population Growth
| Year | Pop. | ±% |
|---|---|---|
| 2001 | 1,055 | — |
| 2006 | 1,492 | +41.4% |
| 2011 | 1,656 | +11.0% |
| 2016 | 2,523 | +52.4% |
| 2021 | 3,136 | +24.3% |

In the 2021 Census of Population conducted by Statistics Canada, Mitchell had a population of 2,828 living in 858 of its 883 total private dwellings, a change of 24.1% from its 2016 population of 2,279. With a land area of 3.3 km^{2} (1.3 sq mi), it had a population density of 857.0/km^{2} (2,219.5/sq mi) in 2021.
