= Southeast Event Centre =

Multi-use indoor arena in Steinbach, Manitoba

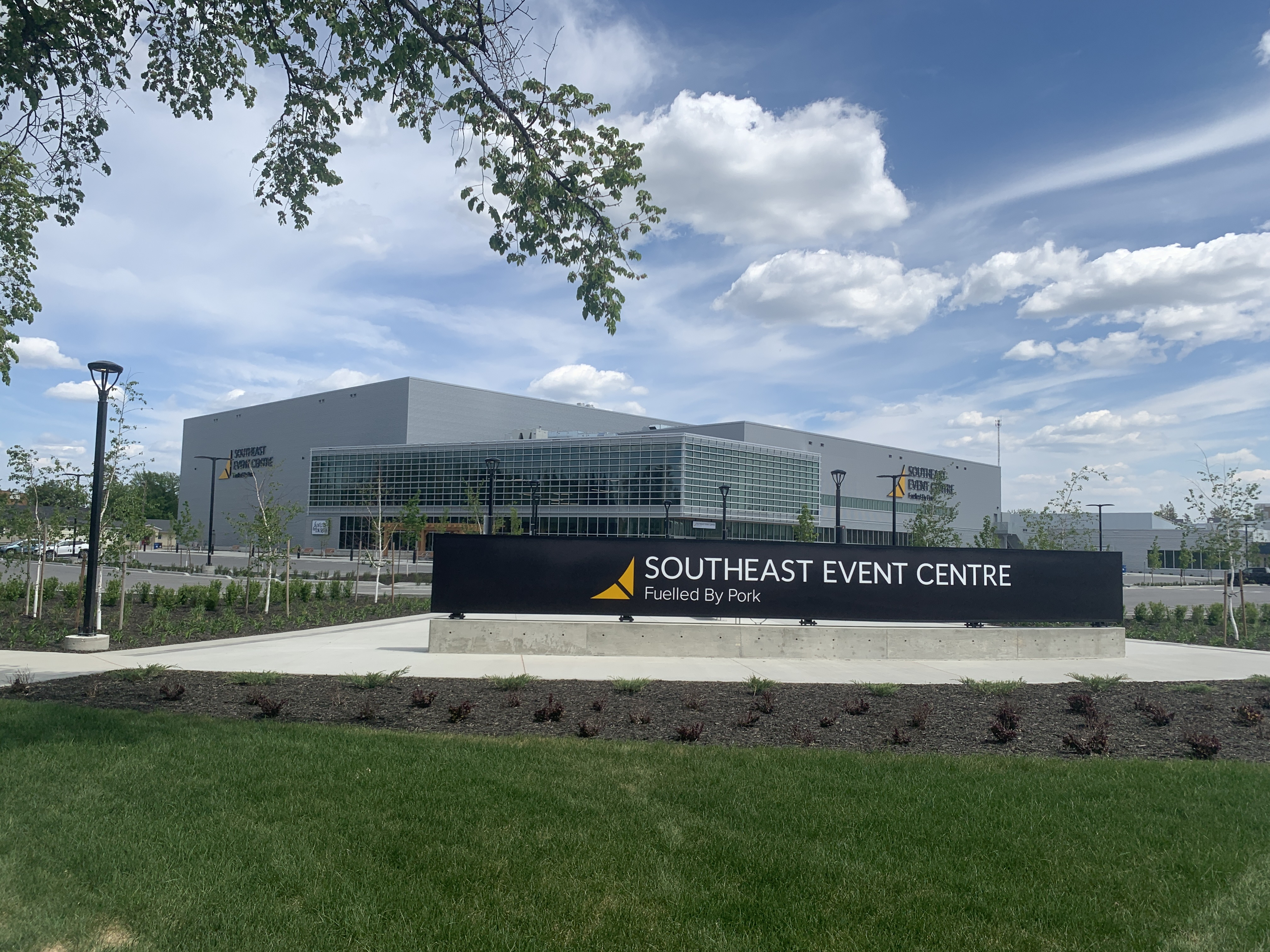
- Interactive map of Southeast Event Centre
- Location: 321 Elmdale Street; Steinbach, Manitoba, CAN
- Coordinates: 49.5268°N 96.6810°W
- Owner: City of Steinbach
- Capacity: 2,400 (Hockey); 4,000 (Concerts/Events)
- Surface: Multi-surface

Construction
- Groundbreaking: January 27, 2023
- Opened: March 14, 2025
- Cost: $74.3 million
- Architect: Verne Reimer Architecture Inc.

Tenants
- Steinbach Pistons (MJHL) (2025–present); Eastman Selects (MU18HL) 2025-present

Website
- www.southeasteventcentre.ca

The Southeast Event Centre is a hockey arena and multi-purpose facility located in downtown Steinbach, Manitoba, Canada.

Its main 2,400-seat rink is the home to the Steinbach Pistons of the Manitoba Junior Hockey League. The 112,000 square foot facility also includes a public gym, restaurant, walking track and other facilities. It is adjacent to the smaller T.G. Smith Arena, the Steinbach Curling Club, and a movie theatre.

Construction began in 2023, with the arena opening in 2025. The cost of construction was estimated to be $74.3 million. The arena replaced the Centennial Arena, built in 1967 and demolished in 2023.

== Events ==
=== Curling ===
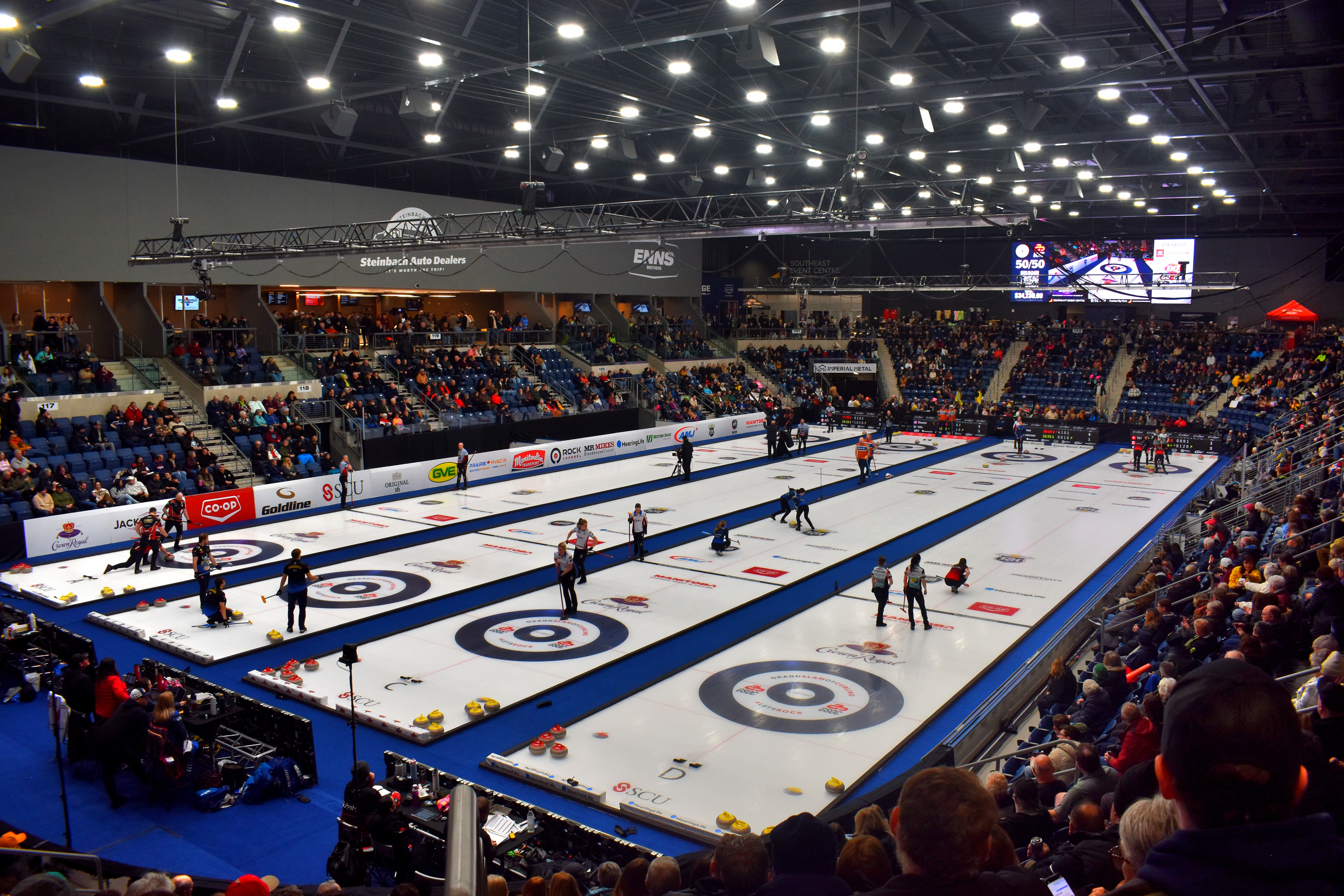
A view inside the Southeast Event Centre during the 2026 Players` Championship.

In January 2026, the Southeast Event Centre hosted the Players' Championship of the Grand Slam of Curling. The championships were won by the Ross Whyte team of Scotland and the Silvana Tirinzoni team of Switzerland.
