= Springfield Xtreme =

- City: Oakbank, Manitoba
- League: Hanover Tache Junior Hockey League
- Founded: 1988
- Home arena: Oakbank ONE Insurance Arena
- General manager: Paul Francis
- Head coach: Kevin Augustine
- Website: www.Xtreme-hockey.com

The Springfield Xtreme are a junior 'C' club based in Oakbank, Manitoba. Established in 1988, the team competes in the Hanover Tache Junior Hockey League.

Springfield captured their first league championship in 2017 defeating Red River Mudbugs in six games.

== Season-by-season ==
Note: GP = Games played, W = Wins, L = Losses, OTL = Overtime Losses, SOL = Shootout Losses, Pts = Points

Season	GP	W	L	OTL	SOL	Pts	Finish	Playoffs
2008–09	24	14	9	1	0	29	4th of 8	Lost semifinals vs Red River 4–1
2009–10	24	15	8	0	1	31	3rd of 8	Lost semifinals vs Steinbach Huskies 3–2
2010–11	24	16	8	0	0	32	4th of 9	Lost quarterfinals vs Steinbach Huskies 3–2
2011–12	27	14	11	2	0	30	6th of 10	Lost quarterfinals vs Grunthal 3–0
2012–13	24	17	6	0	1	35	3rd of 9	Lost semifinals vs Steinbach Huskies 4–0
2013–14	21	9	12	2	0	20	5th of 8	Lost semifinals vs Grunthal 4–0
2014–15	22	10	11	1	0	21	5th of 7	Lost semifinals vs Steinbach Huskies 4–0
2015–16	20	10	7	1	2	23	4th of 6	Won semifinals vs Steinbach Huskies 4–0; Lost finals vs Lorette 2–4
2016–17	24	17	7	0	0	34	2nd of 7	Won quarterfinals vs Mitchell 3–2; Won semifinals vs Steinbach Huskies 4–0; Won finals vs Red River 4–2
2017–18	25	19	5	0	1	39	2nd of 6	Lost semifinals vs St. Adolphe 0–4
2018–19	24	12	10	1	1	26	3rd of 7	Won quarterfinals vs St. Adolphe 3–2; Won semifinals vs Lorette 4–2; Lost finals vs Red River 1–4
2019–20	25	23	3	1	1	46	1st of 6	Won semifinals vs Steinbach 4–1; Led finals vs Lorette 1–0 (Cancelled due to COVID-19)
2020–21	2	2	0	0	0	4	2nd of 9	Season suspended/cancelled due to COVID-19
2021–22	20	14	4	0	2	30	2nd of 6	Won semifinals vs Steinbach 4–3; Lost finals vs Lorette COMETS 3–4
2022–23	24	16	7	0	1	33	3rd of 7	Won quarterfinals vs Landmark BLUES 3–0; Lost semifinals vs Red River MUDBUGS 3–4
2023–24	28	23	4	0	1	47	2nd of 7	Won quarterfinals vs Landmark BLUES 3–0; Won semifinals vs Lorette COMETS 4-0; Lost finals vs Steinbach HUSKIES 0-4
2024–25	25	23	1	0	1	47	1st of 5 East; 1st of 10 League	Won Div Semifinals vs Ste Anne ACES 3–0; Won Div Finals vs Steinbach HUSKIES 4-1; Lost Finals vs Niverville CLIPPERS 2-4

== See also ==
- List of ice hockey teams in Manitoba
