= 2017 Telus Cup =

Tournament details
- Venue: CN Centre in Prince George, BC
- Dates: April 24 – 30, 2017
- Teams: 6

Final positions
- Champions: Cape Breton West Islanders
- Runners-up: Blizzard du Séminaire Saint-François
- Third place: Mississauga Rebels

Tournament statistics
- Scoring leader: Maxime Collin

Awards
- MVP: Jacob Hudson

The 2017 Telus Cup was Canada's 39th annual national midget 'AAA' hockey championship, contested April 24 – 30, 2017 at the CN Centre in Prince George, British Columbia. The Cape Breton West Islanders defeated the Blizzard du Séminaire Saint-François 5-4 in overtime to win the gold medal, becoming the first team from Atlantic Canada to win a national midget championship.

== Teams ==
Result	Team	Region	City
1st place, gold medalist(s)	Cape Breton West Islanders	Atlantic	Port Hood, Nova Scotia
2nd place, silver medalist(s)	Blizzard du Séminaire Saint-François	Quebec	Saint-Augustin-de-Desmaures, Quebec
3rd place, bronze medalist(s)	Mississauga Rebels	Central	Mississauga, Ontario
4	Regina Pat Canadians	West	Regina, Saskatchewan
5	Leduc Oil Kings	Pacific	Leduc, Alberta
6	Cariboo Cougars	Host	Prince George, BC

== Round robin ==
Pos	Team	Pld	W	L	D	GF	GA	GD	Pts
1	Mississauga Rebels	5	3	1	1	13	8	+5	7
2	Blizzard du Séminaire Saint-François	5	3	2	0	16	12	+4	6
3	Regina Pat Canadians	5	2	2	1	18	17	+1	5
4	Cape Breton West Islanders	5	2	3	0	11	12	−1	4
5	Leduc Oil Kings	5	2	3	0	16	18	−2	4
6	Cariboo Cougars	5	1	2	2	11	18	−7	4

Tiebreaker: Head-to-head record, most wins, highest goal differential.

Schedule and Results
Game	Away team	Score	Home team	Score	Notes	Date
1	Cape Breton	2	Séminaire Saint-François	1	Final	April 24
2	Mississauga	5	Regina	2	Final	April 24
3	Cariboo	1	Leduc	4	Final	April 24
4	Mississauga	4	Séminaire Saint-François	0	Final	April 25
5	Leduc	1	Cape Breton	4	Final	April 25
6	Regina	3	Cariboo	3	Final	April 25
7	Leduc	4	Mississauga	1	Final	April 26
8	Séminaire Saint-François	3	Regina	2	Final	April 26
9	Cariboo	4	Cape Breton	3	Final	April 26
10	Regina	6	Leduc	4	Final	April 27
11	Cape Breton	0	Mississauga	1	Final	April 27
12	Séminaire Saint-François	6	Cariboo	1	Final	April 27
13	Cape Breton	2	Regina	5	Final	April 28
14	Séminaire Saint-François	3	Leduc	6	Final	April 28
15	Mississauga	2	Cariboo	2	Final	April 28

== Playoffs ==
Game	Away team	Score	Home team	Score	Notes	Date
Semi 1	Regina	3	Séminaire Saint-François	4	OT Final	April 29
Semi 2	Cape Breton	2	Mississauga	1	Final	April 29
Bronze	Regina	1	Mississauga	4	Final	April 30
Gold	Cape Breton	5	Séminaire Saint-François	4	OT Final	April 30

== Individual awards ==
- Most Valuable Player: Jacob Hudson (Cape Breton)
- Top Scorer: Maxime Collin (Séminaire Saint-François)
- Top Forward: Dillon Hamaliuk (Leduc)
- Top Defensive Player: Jeremy Gervais (Cariboo)
- Top Goaltender: Christian Purboo (Mississauga)
- Most Sportsmanlike Player: Maxime Collin (Séminaire Saint-François)
- Esso Scholarship: Dylan MacDonald (Cape Breton)

== Road to the Telus Cup ==
=== Atlantic Region ===
Cape Breton West Islanders advance by winning tournament played March 30–April 2, 2017 in Miramichi, New Brunswick.

Round Robin
Pos	Qualification	Team	Pld	W	L	D	GF	GA	GD	Pts
1	NSMMHL	Cape Breton West Islanders	4	3	1	0	20	11	+9	6
2	NBPEIMMHL	Moncton Flyers	4	3	1	0	18	11	+7	6
3	NLMMHL	St. John's Maple Leafs	4	3	1	0	18	11	+7	6
4	Host	Miramichi Rivermen	4	1	3	0	13	24	−11	2
5	NBPEIMMHL	Kensington Wild	4	0	4	0	5	17	−12	0

Championship Game
Away team	Score	Home team	Score
Moncton	2	Cape Breton	3

=== Québec ===
Blizzard du Séminaire Saint-François advance by winning Quebec Midget AAA Hockey League championship series.

Best-of-7 series
Pos	Team	Pld	W	L	GF	GA	GD
1	Blizzard du Séminaire Saint-François	4	4	0	14	9	+5
2	Estacades de Trois-Rivières	4	0	4	9	14	−5

=== Central Region ===
Mississauga Rebels advance by winning tournament played March 26–April 2, 2016 in Sudbury, Ontario.

Round Robin
Pos	Qualification	Team	Pld	W	L	D	GF	GA	GD	Pts
1	GTHL	Mississauga Rebels	5	3	0	2	19	10	+9	8
2	Alliance	Windsor Jr. Spitfires	5	4	1	0	21	11	+10	8
3	Host	Sudbury Nickel Capital Wolves	5	2	1	2	19	14	+5	6
4	GNML	North Bay Trappers	5	2	3	0	13	22	−9	4
5	OMHA	Oakville Rangers	5	1	2	2	20	13	+7	4
6	HEO	Cornwall Colts	5	0	5	0	4	26	−22	0

Playoff Round
Game	Away team	Score	Home team	Score
SF 1	Sudbury	2	Windsor	3
SF 2	North Bay	1	Mississauga	3
Final	Windsor	0	Mississauga	4

=== West Region ===
Regina Pat Canadians advance by winning tournament played March 30–April 2, 2017 at the T.G. Smith Centre in Steinbach, Manitoba.

Round Robin
Pos	Qualification	Team	Pld	W	L	D	GF	GA	GD	Pts
1	SMAAAHL	Regina Pat Canadians	3	3	0	0	13	4	+9	6
2	HNO	Thunder Bay Kings	3	2	1	0	10	8	+2	4
3	Host	Eastman Selects	3	1	2	0	9	14	−5	2
4	MMAAAHL	Winnipeg Wild	3	0	3	0	6	12	−6	0

Championship Game
Away team	Score	Home team	Score
Thunder Bay	2	Regina	4

=== Pacific Region ===
Series not played: Leduc Oil Kings advance automatically as Cariboo Cougars are the national host team.

Best-of-3 series
Pos	Qualification	Team	Pld	W	L	GF	GA	GD
-	AMHL	Leduc Oil Kings	0	0	0	0	0	0
-	BCMMHL	Cariboo Cougars	0	0	0	0	0	0

== See also ==
- Telus Cup
