= Mitchell Mustangs =

Canadian junior 'C' ice hockey team

Mitchell Mustangs/Mohawks
- City: Mitchell, Manitoba
- League: Hanover Tache Junior Hockey League Eastman Minor Hockey Association
- Founded: 1988
- Home arena: Mitchell Arena
- Colours: Blue, White, Red
- General manager: Jason Fehr
- Head coach: T Doerksen
- Captain: N/A

The Mitchell Mohawks were a Canadian junior 'C' ice hockey team based in Mitchell, Manitoba until 2019. A senior team with the same name also competed in the Carillon Senior Hockey League until 2013. The minor hockey organization (U7-U18) changed its name from Mitchell Mohawks to Mitchell Mustangs in 2020. The junior team, established in 1988, competed in the Hanover Tache Junior Hockey League. The team has won two league championships. After going on hiatus for two seasons (2012–14) the team returned to league play for the 2014–15 season and has again been on hiatus since the end of the 2018–2019 season. The 2024-25 season marked a return of a Mitchell team to the HTJHL with the entry of the Mitchell Mustangs.

== HTJHL Championships ==
- 1992–93
- 2003–04

(2006–07, 2007-08 Finalists)

== Season-by-season ==
Note: GP = Games played, W = Wins, L = Losses, OTL = Overtime Losses, SOL = Shootout Losses, Pts = Points

Season	GP	W	L	OTL	SOL	Pts	Finish	Playoffs
2003-04	24	17	7	0	0	34	1st of 8	Defeated Springfield in Final 4 - 3
2008-09	24	13	9	1	0	28	1st of 8	lost quarterfinals vs Springfield 3-0
2009-10	24	5	18	1	0	11	8th of 8	lost quarterfinals vs Lorette 3-0
2010-11	24	12	10	1	1	26	6th of 9	lost quarterfinals vs Red River 3-2
2011-12	27	10	17	0	0	20	7th of 10	lost quarterfinals vs Lorette 3-1
2014–15	22	2	19	1	0	5	7th of 7	lost quarterfinals vs Steinbach 3-0
2015-16	20	6	13		1	13	6th of 6	Lost quarterfinals vs Red River 0-3
2016-17	24	5	16	2	1	13	7th of 7	lost quarterfinals vs Springfield 2-3
2017-18	25	8	17			16	5th of 6	Lost quarterfinals vs Comets 1-3
2018-19	24	7	16	1		15	6th of 7	Lost quarterfinals vs Springfield 2-3
Mitchell Mustangs
2024-25	26	15	10	1	0	31	3rd of 5 East Div; 4th of 10 HTJHL	Lost Div Semis 0-3 Steinbach
2025-26	30	21	9	0	0	42	3rd of 11 HTJHL	Won Div Quarters 3-1 Aces; Lost Semifinals 2-4 Extreme

== Senior Mohawks ==
The Senior Mohawks were co-founders of the CSHL in 2003. The team became the first champion to represent the league at the Allan Cup by winning the first two CSHL championships. After five seasons, the club went on hiatus for three seasons from 2008 to 2011, but returned for the 2011–12 and 2012–13 seasons. The team again went on hiatus in 2013. The Senior Mohawks were previously members of the Hanover-Tache Hockey League.

=== CSHL Championships ===
- 2003-04
- 2004-05

=== Season-by-season ===
Note: GP = Games played, W = Wins, L = Losses, OTL = Overtime Losses, SOL = Shootout Losses, Pts = Points

Season	GP	W	L	OTL	SOL	Pts	Finish	Playoffs
2011-12	24	13	7	2	2	30	3rd of 7	lost semifinals vs Niverville 4-1 (best-of 7)
2012-13	21	13	8	0	0	26	3rd of 8	lost quarterfinals vs St. Malo 3-0 (best-of 5)

== See also ==
- List of ice hockey teams in Manitoba
