= CSHL =

CSHL may refer to:

- Carillon Senior Hockey League, a defunct ice hockey league in Manitoba
- Central States Hockey League, a former name of the North American 3 Hockey League, an ice hockey league in the United States
- Club Sportif de Hammam-Lif, a football club in Tunisia
- Cold Spring Harbor Laboratory, a scientific research centre in New York
- Como-Harriet Streetcar Line, a heritage line in Minneapolis, United States
