= Jonathan Filewich =

Canadian ice hockey player

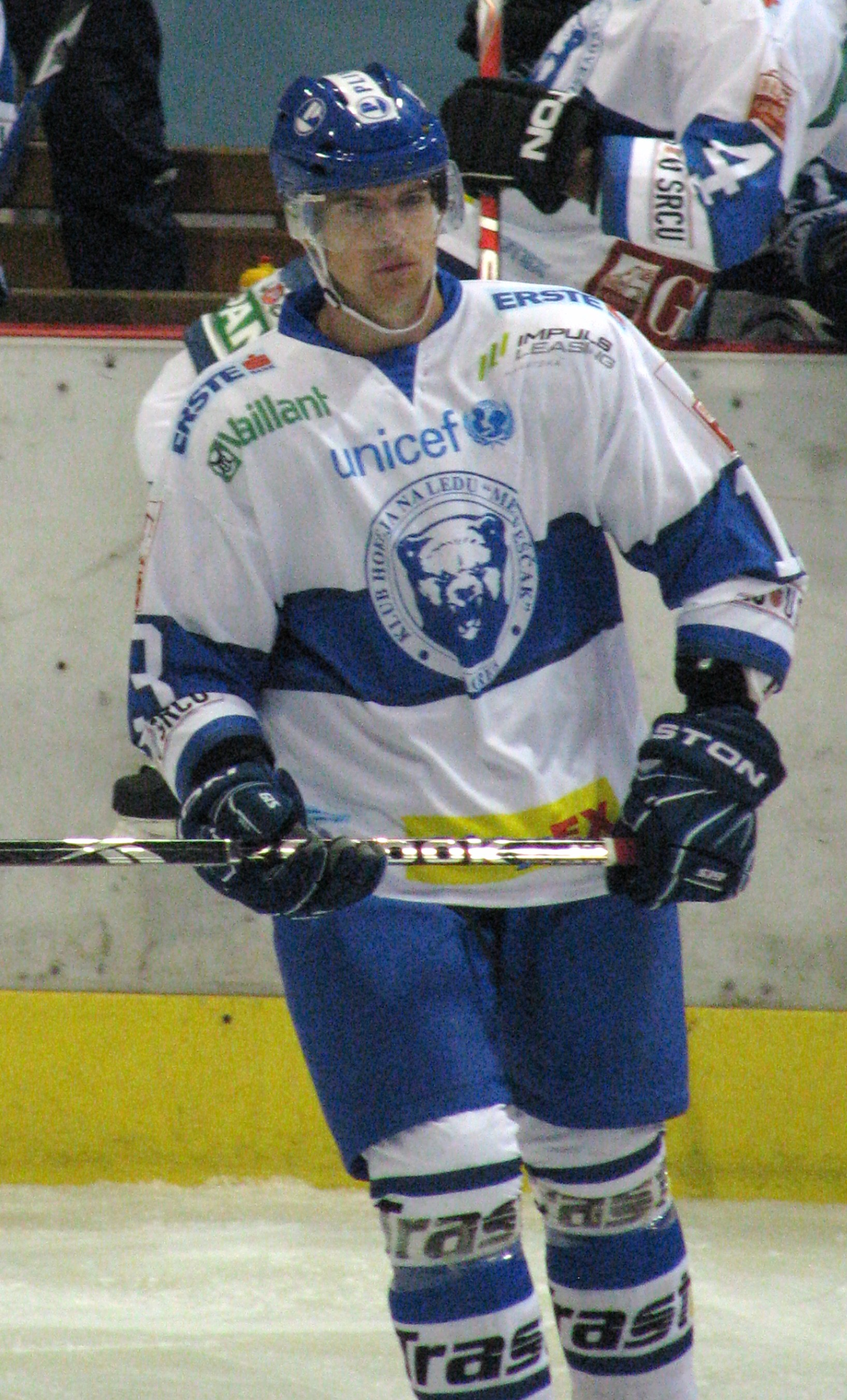
- Born: October 2, 1984 (age 41) Kelowna, British Columbia, Canada
- Height: 6 ft 2 in (188 cm)
- Weight: 208 lb (94 kg; 14 st 12 lb)
- Position: Right wing
- Shot: Right
- Played for: EC Red Bull Salzburg; KHL Medveščak Zagreb; Pittsburgh Penguins
- National team: Canada
- NHL draft: 70th overall, 2003; Pittsburgh Penguins
- Playing career: 2005–2011

Jonathan Filewich (born October 2, 1984) is a Canadian former professional ice hockey player of Croatian ancestry Filewich was born in Kelowna, British Columbia.

== Playing career ==
Filewich was drafted 70th overall in the 2003 NHL entry draft by the Pittsburgh Penguins. After playing six seasons in the Western Hockey League with the Prince George Cougars and the Lethbridge Hurricanes, he began his professional career with the Wilkes-Barre/Scranton Penguins, Pittsburgh's AHL affiliate, in the 2005–06 season. He participated in the 2007 AHL All-Star Game at Ricoh Coliseum in Toronto, Ontario and assisted on one of Team Canada's goals in a 7-6 defeat to the Planet USA All-Stars.

On January 20, 2008, Jonathan was recalled from the AHL to play with the big club, the Pittsburgh Penguins. Wearing the number 34 on his jersey, he amassed a total of five games, with his NHL debut being played against the Washington Capitals on January 21. One highlight of his stint in the NHL was his 10 minutes and 47 seconds of time on ice in a 4–2 win over the New Jersey Devils. Jonathan was sent back down to Wilkes-Barre/Scranton in early February, just after the all-star break.

On December 19, 2008, he was traded from the Penguins to the St. Louis Blues for a conditional sixth round draft pick in 2010. Filewich was assigned to AHL affiliate, the Peoria Rivermen, for the duration of the season and didn't debut with the Blues. On June 30, 2009, he was tendered a contract with St. Louis but failed to agree to terms. On October 2, 2009, he left North America and signed with EC Red Bull Salzburg of the Austrian Hockey League. In the 2009–10 season, he posted 32 points in 45 games, as Salzburg went on to win the Championship.

On June 7, 2010, he signed as a free agent to a one-year contract with fellow EBEL team KHL Medveščak Zagreb.

After two seasons in Europe, Filewich retired from professional hockey after the 2010-11 EBEL season. During his final years as a professional hockey player, Filewich often worked on correspondence courses while in the team hotel and while travelling on the bus. Filewich graduated from Brandon University in spring 2013 with a degree in physical education and has said he would like to become a teacher.

After retiring from professional hockey, Filewich played senior hockey for the Souris Elks of the Tiger Hills Hockey League. In 4 seasons, Filewich scored 71 goals, and recorded 80 assists over a 71 game career.

== Career statistics ==
=== Regular season and playoffs ===
			Regular season					Playoffs
Season	Team	League	GP	G	A	Pts	PIM	GP	G	A	Pts	PIM
1998–99	Sherwood Park Flyers AAA	AMBHL	39	26	43	72	90	—	—	—	—	—
1999–2000	Sherwood Park Kings AAA	AMHL	33	28	20	48	59	—	—	—	—	—
1999–2000	Prince George Cougars	WHL	3	0	0	0	2	—	—	—	—	—
2000–01	Prince George Cougars	WHL	61	9	16	25	32	—	—	—	—	—
2001–02	Prince George Cougars	WHL	66	13	19	32	23	7	2	0	2	2
2002–03	Prince George Cougars	WHL	51	27	27	54	45	5	1	1	2	2
2003–04	Prince George Cougars	WHL	72	30	25	55	52	—	—	—	—	—
2004–05	Lethbridge Hurricanes	WHL	68	42	38	80	26	5	1	1	2	2
2005–06	Wilkes–Barre/Scranton Penguins	AHL	73	22	14	36	40	11	6	4	10	6
2006–07	Wilkes–Barre/Scranton Penguins	AHL	80	30	26	56	38	11	4	2	6	8
2007–08	Wilkes–Barre/Scranton Penguins	AHL	71	10	21	31	44	14	1	2	3	2
2007–08	Pittsburgh Penguins	NHL	5	0	0	0	0	—	—	—	—	—
2008–09	Wilkes–Barre/Scranton Penguins	AHL	19	2	2	4	6	—	—	—	—	—
2008–09	Peoria Rivermen	AHL	49	5	10	15	12	7	2	1	3	6
2009–10	EC Red Bull Salzburg	AUT	45	11	21	32	28	18	4	1	5	14
2010–11	KHL Medveščak Zagreb	AUT	44	13	10	23	26	4	1	0	1	12
2012–13	Souris Elks	THHL	15	24	24	48	4	—	—	—	—	—
2013–14	Souris Elks	THHL	19	24	27	51	6	—	—	—	—	—
2014–15	Souris Elks	THHL	18	21	20	41	10	4	2	3	5	2
2015–16	Souris Elks	THHL	21	20	23	43	18	—	—	—	—	—
2016–17	Souris Elks	THHL	13	6	10	16	4	8	4	3	7	0
AHL totals			292	69	73	142	140	43	13	9	22	22
NHL totals			5	0	0	0	0	—	—	—	—	—

=== International ===
Year	Team	Event	Result	GP	G	A	Pts	PIM
2002	Canada	WJC18	6th	8	4	3	7	22
Junior totals				8	4	3	7	22
