= Hanover Tache Junior Hockey League =

- Sport: Ice hockey
- First season: 1987-88
- President: Darrell Lupky
- No. of teams: 11
- Country: Canada
- Most recent champion: Niverville Clippers (2025)
- Most titles: Steinbach Huskies (10)
- Website: htjhl.com

The Hanover Tache Junior Hockey League is a junior ice hockey league in Manitoba, Canada, sanctioned by Hockey Manitoba. It is the only Junior 'C' league in Manitoba, and as such, league champions are also named provincial Junior 'C' champions.

== History ==
The HTJHL operates exclusively in the southeastern part of the province. It was created in 1987 to complement the now-defunct senior level Hanover-Taché Hockey League, which was succeeded by the Carillon Senior Hockey League.

The number of teams has fluctuated throughout the years, with a high of ten teams competing in 2011-12.

Île-des-Chênes Elks had much success during their 17-season tenure winning the league title six times.

Steinbach Huskies are the most successful club claiming the HTJHL championship ten times (1989, 1990, 2005, 2006, 2007, 2009, 2012, 2014, 2023, 2024).

== Teams ==
Team	Centre	Home arena	Year Joined
East St Paul Gators	East St Paul	East St Paul Arena	2023
Grunthal Red Wings	Grunthal	Grunthal Arena	2024
Landmark Blues	Landmark	Landmark Arena	1987
*Lorette Comets	Lorette	Lorette Community Complex/Île-des-Chênes Arena	2004
Macdonald Swarm	Macdonald	Sanford Recreation Centre	2021
Mitchell Mustangs	Mitchell	Mitchell Arena	2024
Niverville Clippers	Niverville	Niverville Arena	2008
Red River Mudbugs	St. Jean Baptiste	St. Jean Arena	2008
Springfield Xtreme	Oakbank	Oakbank ONE Insurance Arena	1988
Ste. Anne Jr. Aces	Ste. Anne	Ste. Anne Arena	1987
Steinbach Huskies	Steinbach	T.G. Smith Centre	2024
Warren 67's	Warren	Access Credit Union Arena	2025

* = team on hiatus

=== Former/Inactive teams ===
- Beausejour-Brokenhead Shock (2010–2013)
- Grunthal Red Wings (1987–2017; 2018–2021; 2024-present)
- Île-des-Chênes Elks (1987–2004)
- La Broquerie Habs (1987–2005; 2006–09; 2011–14; 2020–21)
- Landmark Blues (1987–1995; 2020–present)
- Mitchell Mohawks (1988–2019)
- Niverville Clippers - (2008-2015; 2020-present)
- Northeast Ice
- Red River Rockets - became Red River Mudbugs
- St. Adolphe Hawks (1999–2008; 2016–18; 2020–21)
- Ste. Anne Aces (1991–2007)(2024-present)
- St. Pierre 59ers (2009–2014)

== League champions ==
Season	Champion	Runner-up	Result	Regular-season winner	W–L–OTL–SOL
1987–88	Landmark Blues				
1988–89	Steinbach Huskies				
1989–90	Steinbach Huskies				
1990–91	Île-des-Chênes Elks				
1991–92	Île-des-Chênes Elks				
1992–93	Mitchell Mohawks				
1993–94	Niverville Clippers				
1994–95	Île-des-Chênes Elks				
1995–96	La Broquerie Habs				
1996–97	La Broquerie Habs				
1997–98	Île-des-Chênes Elks				
1998–99	Île-des-Chênes Elks				
1999–00	La Broquerie Habs				
2000–01	Île-des-Chênes Elks	Steinbach Huskies	4–0	Île-des-Chênes Elks	24-0-0-0
2001–02	La Broquerie Habs	Mitchell Mohawks	4–2	La Broquerie Habs	
2002–03	La Broquerie Habs	Mitchell Mohawks	4–1	La Broquerie Habs	
2003–04	Mitchell Mohawks	Springfield Xtreme	4–3	Springfield Xtreme	
2004–05	Steinbach Huskies				
2005–06	Steinbach Huskies				
2006–07	Steinbach Huskies				
2007–08	Grunthal Red Wings				
2008–09	Steinbach Huskies	Red River Mudbugs	4–1	Steinbach Huskies	15-8-0-1
2009–10	Lorette Comets	Red River Mudbugs	4–3	Lorette Comets	20-4-0-0
2010–11	Grunthal Red Wings	Lorette Comets	4–3	Grunthal Red Wings	19-4-0-1
2011–12	Steinbach Huskies	Lorette Comets	4–1	Lorette Comets Steinbach Huskies	22-4-0-1 22-4-1-0
2012–13	Grunthal Red Wings	Steinbach Huskies	4–2	Grunthal Red Wings	24-0-0-0
2013–14	Steinbach Huskies	Grunthal Red Wings	4–0	Grunthal Red Wings	20-1-0-0
2014–15	Grunthal Red Wings	Steinbach Huskies	4–0	Grunthal Red Wings	21-1-0-0
2015–16	Lorette Comets	Springfield Xtreme	4–2	Steinbach Huskies	14-4-0-2
2016–17	Springfield Xtreme	Red River Mudbugs	4–2	Red River Mudbugs	18-6-0-0
2017–18	Red River Mudbugs	St. Adolphe Hawks	4–0	Red River Mudbugs	15-9-1-0
2018–19	Red River Mudbugs	Springfield Xtreme	4–1	Red River Mudbugs	21-2-0-1
2019–20	no champion	---	---	Springfield Xtreme	21-3-1-0
2020–21	no champion	---	---	---	---
2021–22	Lorette Comets	Springfield Xtreme	4–3	Lorette Comets	16-2-2-0
2022–23	Steinbach Huskies	Red River Mudbugs	4–0	Steinbach Huskies	21-2-0-0
2023–24	Steinbach Huskies	Springfield Xtreme	4–0	Steinbach Huskies	24-2-2-0
2024–25	Niverville Clippers	Springfield Xtreme	4–2	Springfield Xtreme	23-1-21-0
2025–26	MacDonald Swarm	Springfield Xtreme	4–1	MacDonald Swarm	29-1-0-0

Results by team
Club	Wins	First championship won	Last championship won	Runners-up	Last championship lost	Total championship appearances
Steinbach Huskies	10	1988-89	2023-24	2	2014-15	12
Lorette Comets/Île-des-Chênes Elks	9	1990-91	2021-22	5	2011-12	14
La Broquerie Habs	5	1995-96	2002-03	0	–	5
Grunthal Redwings	3	2010-11	2014-15	1	2013-14	4
Red River Mudbugs	2	2017-18	2018-19	5	2022-23	7
Mitchell Mohawks	2	1993-94	2003-04	2	2002-03	4
Niverville Clippers	2	1993-94	2024-25	0	–	2
Springfield Xtreme	1	2016-17	2016-17	7	2025-26	8
MacDonald Swarm	1	2025-26	2025-26	1	–	1
Landmark Blues	1	1987-88	1987-88	0	–	1

Note teams in italics are no longer active.

== See also ==
- Hanover-Taché Hockey League
- Carillon Senior Hockey League
