= Fred Marples =

Canadian sports executive (1885–1945)

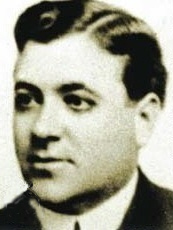
- Born: January 27, 1885; Winnipeg, Manitoba, Canada
- Died: January 17, 1945 (aged 59); Toronto, Ontario, Canada
- Occupations: Merchant, businessman
- Known for: Canadian Olympic Committee; Canadian Amateur Hockey Association; Manitoba Amateur Hockey Association
- Family: Stan Marples (brother)
- Awards: Manitoba Hockey Hall of Fame

Frederick Paul Henry Marples (January 27, 1885 – January 17, 1945) was a Canadian sports executive in ice hockey and athletics. He was president of the Winnipeg Monarchs team which won Winnipeg Amateur Hockey League championships in 1914 and 1915, and the Allan Cup as senior ice hockey champions of Canada. His operation of a reserve team to support the Monarchs led to debates on player eligibility for the Allan Cup and calls for a national governing body of hockey. As the secretary-treasurer of the Winnipeg Amateur Hockey League, he helped establish both the Manitoba Amateur Hockey Association (MAHA) and the Canadian Amateur Hockey Association (CAHA) in 1914; then served as secretary-treasurer of the MAHA from 1914 to until 1934, and as secretary of the CAHA from 1926 to 1945. He sought to grow the game in rural regions of Manitoba, promote minor ice hockey as a source of future senior players, to keep players in junior ice hockey until age 21, and was against the exodus of amateur players to professional teams.

Marples was an athlete in his younger days and won the relay event at the 1909 Canadian Track and Field Championships with a team from the Winnipeg North End Amateur Athletic Club. He later served as secretary-treasurer of the club, then as a track and field official for the Amateur Athletic Union of Canada, the 1928 Summer Olympics, and the 1930 British Empire Games. As the secretary-treasurer of the Canadian Olympic Committee from 1922 to 1936, he urged Canadians and provincial governments to support fundraising efforts for athletes at international competitions, and led efforts to establish the Manitoba Citizens' Olympic Committee in 1932. He served as the head of mission for the Canadian delegation at the 1936 Winter Olympics in Germany, which saw the Canada men's national ice hockey team fail to win the gold medal amid disagreements on the eligibility of players and how the medals were determined. He was posthumously inducted as an individual into the builder category of the Manitoba Hockey Hall of Fame, and was inducted into both the Manitoba Sports Hall of Fame and the Manitoba Hockey Hall of Fame as a member of the Winnipeg Monarchs.

== Early life and Winnipeg athletics ==
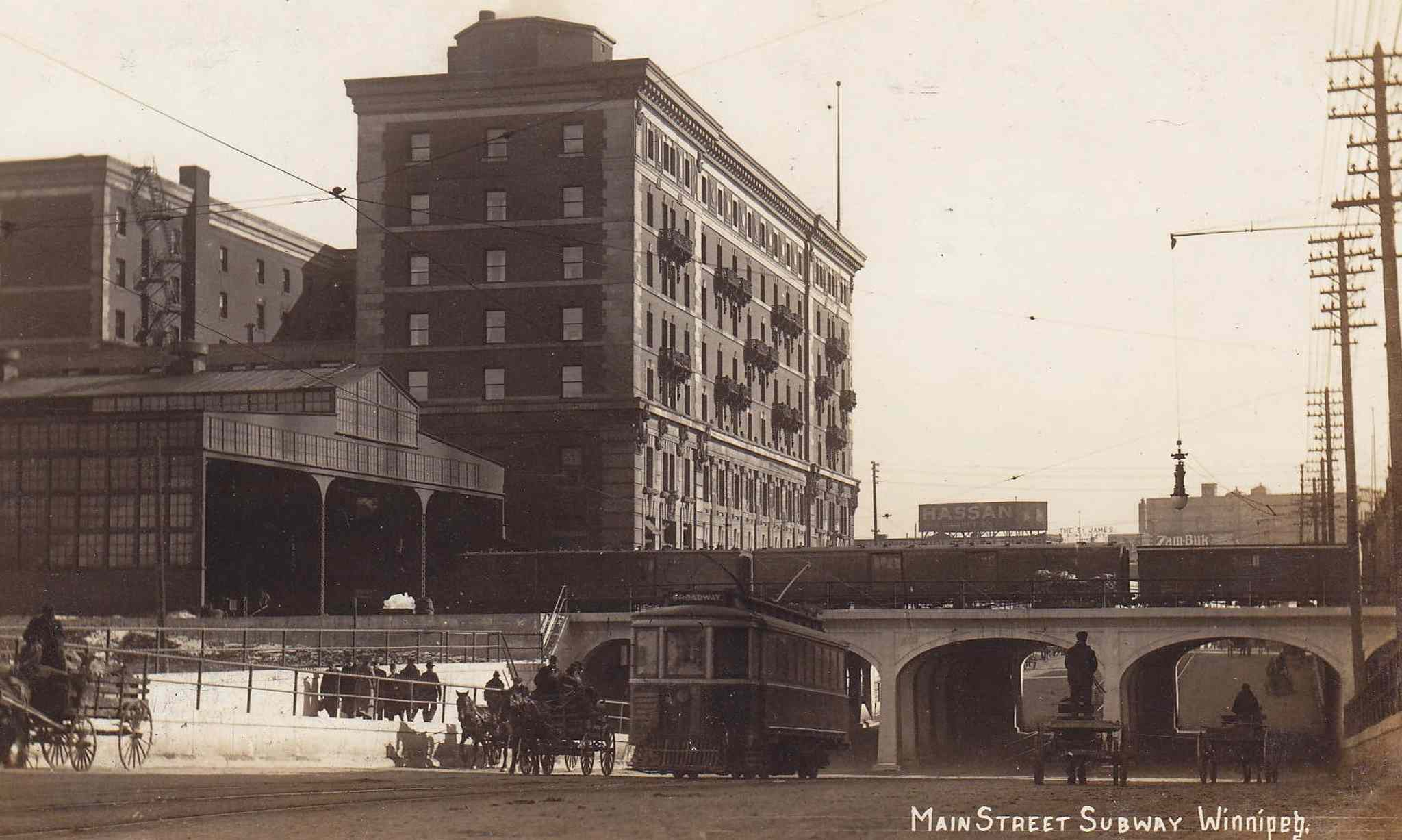
Main Street in North End, Winnipeg, c. 1910

Frederick Paul Henry Marples was born on January 27, 1885, in Winnipeg, Manitoba. He grew up in a family of ten boys and one girl, raised by parents Francis William Marples and Katherine Marples. Marples was an all-round athlete in his younger days. He ran on a Winnipeg North End Athletic Club team which won the relay event at the 1909 Canadian Track and Field Championships held in Winnipeg. The team included his brother Herb and had won all fifteen of its races as of 1910. Marples also played recreational curling with the Winnipeg North End Athletic Club.

Marples was elected secretary-treasurer of the Winnipeg North End Amateur Athletic Club in 1909, and helped co-ordinate its running events and track and field meets. He was a regular on-course judge and a track and field official for events held by the club and the Amateur Athletic Union of Canada (AAU of C). He was the club's delegate to meetings of the Manitoba branch of the AAU of C, was elected first vice-president of the branch in 1914, and sat on the organizing committee for the 1915 Canadian Track and Field Championships held in Winnipeg.

In 1922, Marples resigned from the Winnipeg North End Athletic Club to focus his efforts on Canadian national teams and the Olympic Games. He remained involved as an on-course judge for the club's races, and was made honorary vice-president of the club in 1926.

== Manitoba hockey executive ==
=== Early hockey career ===
Marples became an ice hockey executive during the 1909–10 season, when he was appointed secretary of the Winnipeg Monarchs. The Monarchs were a senior ice hockey team which played in the Winnipeg Amateur Hockey League, and included his brother Stan Marples. As secretary, Marples co-ordinated exhibition tours by the Monarchs in the United States in 1910 and 1912.

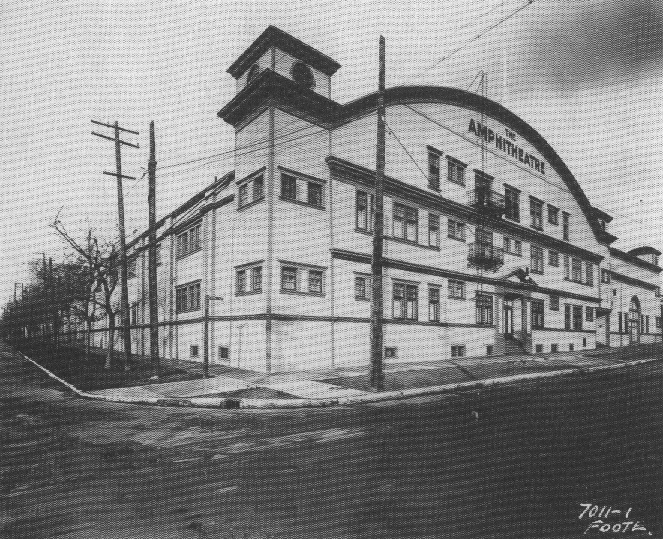
Winnipeg Amphitheatre

The Monarchs merged with the Winnipeg Strathconas as of the 1912–13 season due to struggles in finding ice time, and elected Marples as their president. He was also elected as the secretary-treasurer of the Winnipeg Amateur Hockey League in which the Monarchs played. He arranged extra time at the Winnipeg Amphitheatre for practices and games, and felt that it would improve the chances of the Monarchs winning the Allan Cup. The decision to use the Amphitheatre caused a rift within the league which had an agreement in the previous season to play all games at the Winnipeg Auditorium. Marples and the Monarchs felt that the league did not have the authority to bind any club to any single rink, and that the Amphitheatre had better amenities for the players and spectators. League president W. F. Taylor cast a tie-breaking vote to uphold the agreement to play all games at the Auditorium.

=== 1913–14 season and the Allan Cup ===
The Winnipeg Tribune wrote that the leadership of Marples and Taylor had brought peace and financial stability to the Winnipeg Amateur Hockey League, and both were re-elected to the same positions for the 1913–14 season. Marples advocated for the league to appoint a board of on-ice officials to avoid in-season arguing over the selection of officials. The league approved of the proposal by Marples, appointed a board of referees in advance of the season, and chose to play its games at both the Amphitheatre and the Auditorium.

Marples resurrected the Strathconas senior team and entered them into the Independent Amateur Hockey League, in addition to operating the Monarchs in the Winnipeg Amateur Hockey League. He felt it necessary to give the younger players more opportunities to practice and play in order to develop talent, secured more ice time and operated the Strathconas as a reserve team to support the Monarchs. The Monarchs won the Winnipeg Amateur Hockey League regular season title and were chosen to defend the first challenge for the 1914 Allan Cup on behalf of the league.

The Allan Cup trophy

The Winnipeg Amateur Hockey League debated whether or not players from the Strathconas were in a lower level of hockey and eligible to be a reserve player. Trustees for the Allan Cup also struggled to determine player eligibility since there was no authoritative national body to classify leagues by the level of play. When Allan Cup trustee William Northey ruled that Dick Irvin of the Strathconas was ineligible to compete, the Monarchs refused to defend the Allan Cup. Marples considered the Strathconas to be a reserve team for the Monarchs and that the decision was unfair to his team. After three days of negotiating, the Monarchs agreed to play without Irvin in a one-game Allan Cup challenge versus the Kenora Thistles, instead of the customary two-game series decided on total goals scored. The Monarchs won by a 6–2 score versus the Kenora Thistles, then lost the second Allan Cup challenge in a one-game final by a 5–4 score to the Regina Victorias.

Players on the Winnipeg Monarchs were presented with motorcycles as gifts after the Allan Cup playoffs. The action was criticized by members of the Manitoba branch of the AAU of C for being against amateur principles and promoting professionalism, despite that the AAU of C constitution did not forbid gifts. Marples defended the action and stated that he and the club would ensure the players did not exchange or sell the motorcycles for profit.

=== Founding the MAHA and the CAHA ===
The Winnipeg Amateur Hockey League met with Allan Cup trustees in June 1914, and agreed on the need to form a national commission to govern ice hockey in Canada and competition for the trophy. The meeting formed a provisional Manitoba Hockey Commission with Marples appointed as its secretary. Marples sent letters to other clubs and leagues in Canada and advocated for establishment of the national commission. He was formally elected secretary of the Manitoba Hockey Commission in July 1914, and assisted in drawing up recommendations for a constitution.

The Canadian Amateur Hockey Association (CAHA) was established on December 4, 1914, in a meeting at the Château Laurier in Ottawa. Marples represented the Winnipeg Monarchs at the meeting, in which Winnipeg Amateur Hockey League president W. F. Taylor was elected president of the CAHA. The new association adopted of a constitution, established by-laws and competition rules which included player registration and eligibility, recognized the Allan Cup as its championship trophy, and affiliated with the AAU of C to exclude professionals from amateur hockey.

The Manitoba Hockey Commission met later in December 1914, and changed its name to become the Manitoba Amateur Hockey Association (MAHA) to align with the CAHA. The MAHA ratified the player registration rules put in place by the CAHA to maintain amateurism and exclude professionals, and sought to expand within Manitoba by recruiting existing leagues to join.

=== 1914–15 season and the Allan Cup ===
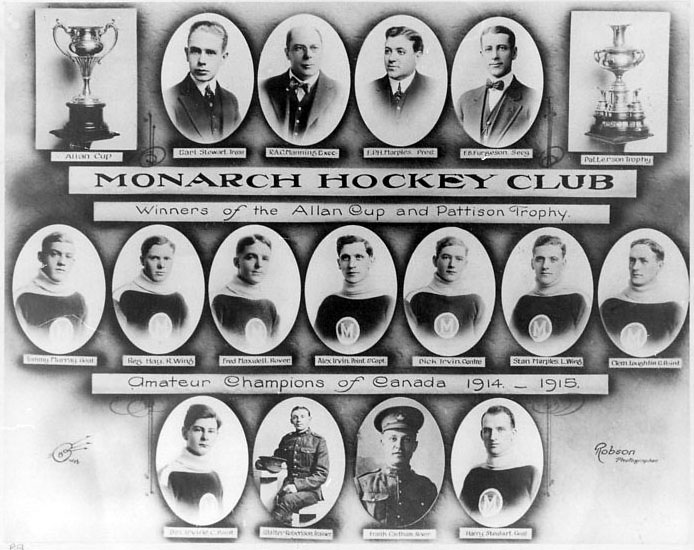
Winnipeg Monarchs team collage in 1915

Before the 1914–15 season, a separate organization named the Strathcona Hockey Club was formed. Marples condemned the new club and stated that the Monarchs had already incorporated the Strathcona name into their club. He felt that the gift of motorcycles to the Monarchs had upset members on the Strathconas who then broke away to form their own club. He vowed to continue the Strathconas under the same management and was recognized by the Winnipeg Independent Hockey League as the representative for the Strathconas.

Marples returned as secretary of the Winnipeg Amateur Hockey League which agreed to register players according to the Allan Cup's eligibility rules. The Winnipeg Monarchs repeated as league champions in the 1914–15 season. In the 1915 Allan Cup playoffs, the Monarchs defeated the Winnipeg Falcons by a total score of 27–14, defeated Fort William by a total score of 16–10, the defeated Edmonton by a total score of 17–8 to reach the final series. The Monarchs defeated the Melville Millionaires by a 4–2 score, and won the 1915 Allan Cup by a two-game total score of 7–6.

=== World War I and patriotic hockey ===
Marples remained as secretary-treasurer of the Winnipeg Amateur Hockey League until the end of the 1919–20 season. He felt that the league's greatest achievement as of 1915, was the establishment of the CAHA and Taylor being elected the first president. The league saw a decrease in the number of senior hockey players during World War I. Marples urged the league to operate during the 1915–16 season to support patriotic fundraising for the war effort, but felt that the CAHA should have temporarily suspended the national championship as of the 1916 Allan Cup. The MAHA approved the Winnipeg Amateur Hockey League for the season with reduced expenses and profits donated to patriotic fundraising efforts.

The Winnipeg Amateur Hockey League renamed itself the Winnipeg Amateur Patriotic Hockey League for the 1916–17 season, and provided a place for teams of soldiers to play including the Winnipeg 61st Battalion. As the MAHA secretary, Marples sought clarity on the eligibility of soldiers in the league for the Allan Cup. CAHA secretary W. A. Hewitt deemed that competitions only involving soldiers would not affect an athlete's amateur or professional status, but that only strictly amateur teams could compete for the Allan Cup.

The Winnipeg Amateur Patriotic Hockey League became the Winnipeg Military Hockey League during the 1917–18 season. Its teams were named for battles fought during World War I, which included the Monarchs temporarily named Ypres and managed by Marples. The Monarchs reverted to their old name as of the 1918–19 season, and resumed competing for the Allan Cup with Marples continuing as president of the team.

=== 1920s and 1930s ===
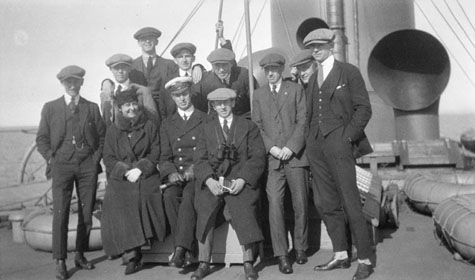
Winnipeg Falcons en route to the 1920 Olympics

Marples served as secretary-treasurer of the MAHA until 1934, and represented the association as a delegate to meetings of the CAHA and the Manitoba branch of the AAU of C.

On behalf of the MAHA, Marples accompanied the Winnipeg Falcons on their trip to Toronto that resulted in winning the 1920 Allan Cup. He convinced Winnipeg City Council to assist with travel expenses to Europe, after the Falcons were chosen to represent Canada in ice hockey at the 1920 Summer Olympics in Belgium. The Falcons then became the first gold medalists in ice hockey at the Olympic Games.

When five players from the Brandon Wheat City Hockey Club senior team suddenly departed after the 1920–21 season ended, Marples stated that it put the players under suspicion of professionalism, but the MAHA could not do anything unless there was proof of players being paid to play or a residency rule violation. In June 1921, Marples and other MAHA officials met with CAHA president W. R. Granger to investigate into charges of professionalism in amateur hockey. The CAHA subsequently established a national registrar and a committee to investigate registrations and reduce the number of players transferring between teams.

The MAHA suspended the Winnipeg Falcons and the Winnipeg Selkirks for the 1923–24 season due to rumors of playing in an international league with team in the United States, which Marples later felt was a mistake by the MAHA. The two Winnipeg teams instead played in the Central Canada Hockey League with senior teams in the Thunder Bay Amateur Hockey Association, which the MAHA considered to be an unaffiliated outlaw league. The MAHA established the Manitoba Senior Hockey League for the 1924–25 season, and Marples sought to include the teams from the Thunder Bay Amateur Hockey Association. Due to ongoing disagreements on which teams were admitted to the Manitoba Senior Hockey League and the 1926–27 season schedules, Marples and MAHA president Abbie Coo formed a committee with team representatives to oversee the league.

Marples advocated for timely submission of registrations to track player transfers, and began enforcing May 15 as a deadline for transfer requests when the CAHA approved the set date as of the 1927–28 season. When the MAHA decreased to only two senior teams by the 1928–29 season due to competition from professional leagues, Marples sought to promote the midget and juvenile age groups in minor ice hockey to provide a source of future senior players. He wanted to see an agreement reached with professional leagues that kept players in junior ice hockey leagues until age 21 before signing a contract, and to grow the game in rural regions of Manitoba when MAHA registrations declined during the Great Depression.

When the Manitoba Women's Amateur Hockey Association was established in 1933, Marples sat on its advisory committee to co-ordinate women's hockey in Manitoba. After he resigned as secretary-treasurer in 1934, the MAHA did not fill the position until the general meeting in 1936.

== National hockey executive ==
Marples served as the secretary-treasurer of the CAHA from 1922 to 1924, appointed by the president Toby Sexsmith. The secretary-treasurer was an ex-officio non-voting member of the executive who was granted an honorarium to cover expenses. The CAHA generated most of its income from gate receipts during the Allan Cup playoffs, and Marples oversaw CAHA expenditures as approved by an agreement with the cup's trustees.

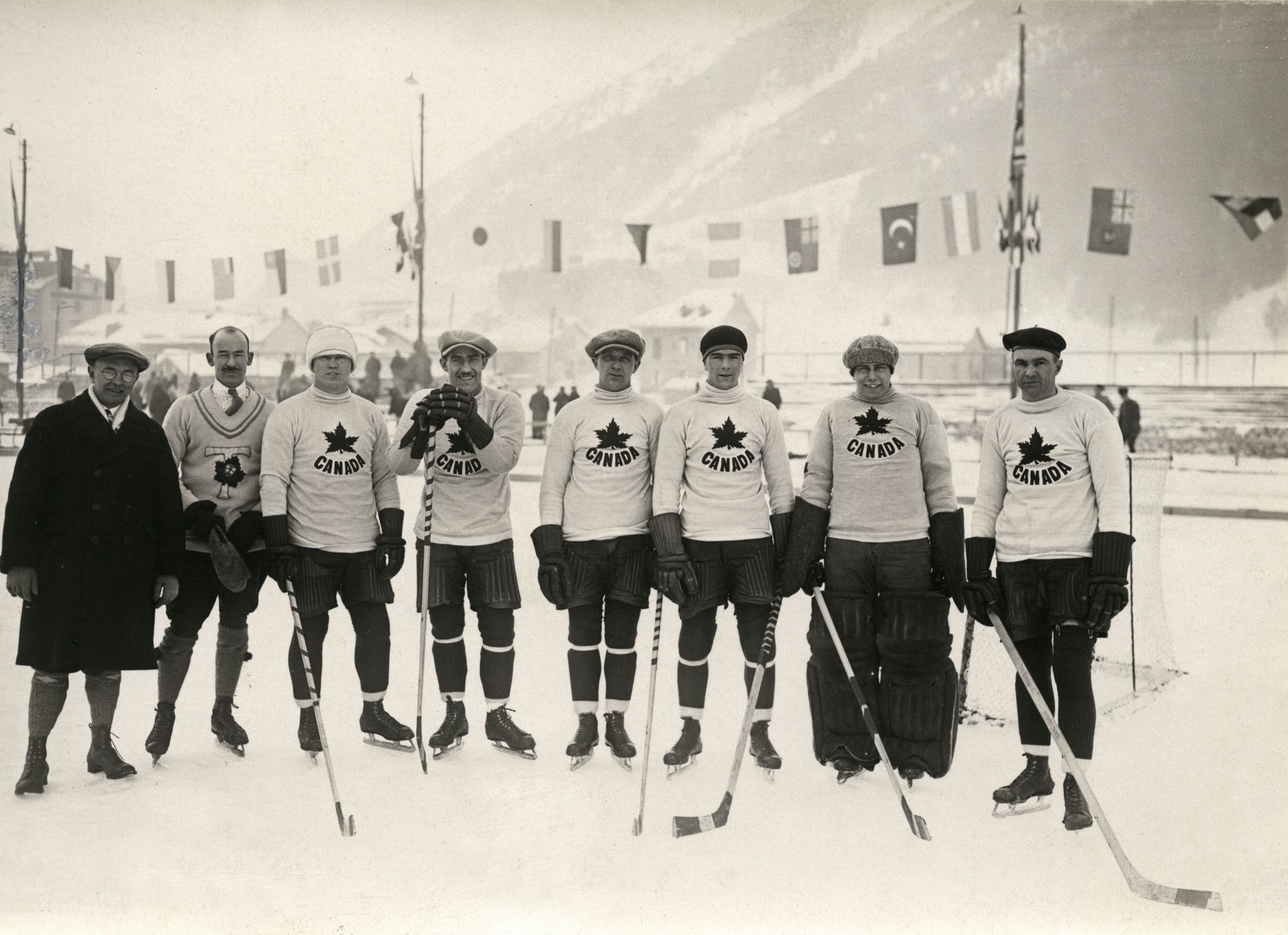
Toronto Granites representing Canada at the 1924 Winter Olympics

When ice hockey at the 1924 Winter Olympics was scheduled to be played during late January and early February, Marples doubted that Canada would be represented since the proposed dates overlapped with the Allan Cup playoffs. The CAHA chose the Toronto Granites who won the 1923 Allan Cup to represent Canada instead of participating in the 1924 Allan Cup competition. Marples and the CAHA supported the Canada men's national ice hockey team by paying C$2,000 in travel expenses and the Granites won Canada's second gold medal in Olympic hockey.

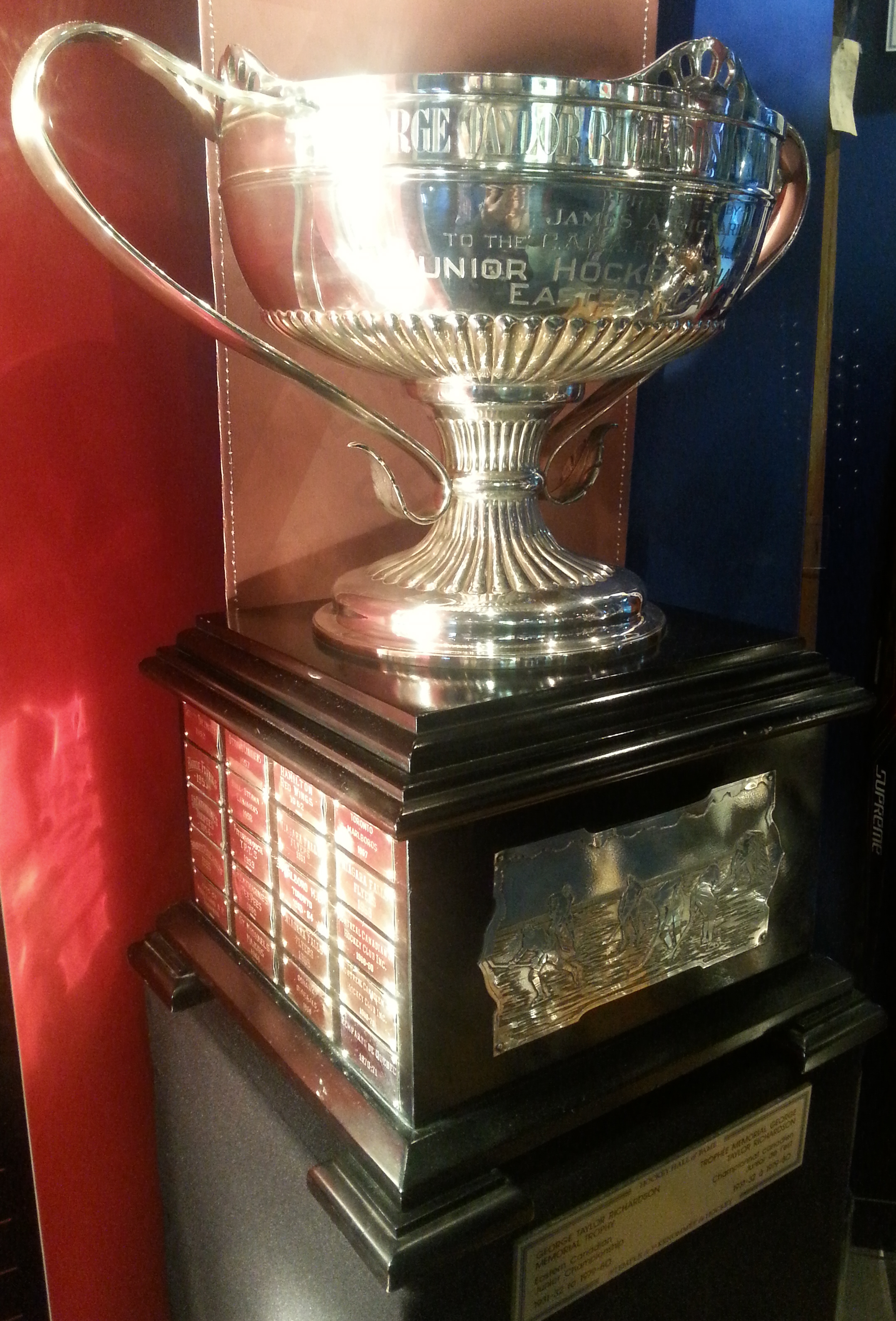
George Richardson Memorial Trophy

In 1924, Marples was succeeded as secretary-treasurer by Dave Gill. Marples was subsequently named to the CAHA registration committee in 1925, then served as the CAHA secretary again from 1926 to 1945. In 1929, the secretary and registrar-treasurer were made permanent positions on the CAHA executive committee. When the George Richardson Memorial Trophy was established in 1932, Marples was named of three trustees of the cup which was annually awarded to the junior hockey champion of Eastern Canada.

In 1930, the CAHA was faced with the new situation of players returning from professional tryouts without signing a contract. The CAHA agreed that any player who had not received remuneration could be reinstated as an amateur, with Marples handling amateur reinstatement requests as the secretary. The CAHA later changed its position due to losing players to professional teams, and suspended any amateurs who tried out with professional teams. Marples summarized the decision by stating that amateur teams within the CAHA should not be a "feeding ground" for professional leagues. Then CAHA president Jack Hamilton lauded the work of Marples and W. A. Hewitt and said, "These men are untiring in their work, are capable and, above all, real sportsmen. When the CAHA loses either or both — and we trust that it will not be for many years — their places will be hard to fill".

Marples reported that the CAHA lost approximately $7,000 by covering expenses for the national team to the 1936 Olympics. In September 1936, he announced that the CAHA's financial reserves had been further depleted during the Great Depression and that only $1,400 remained to cover expenses during the 1936–37 season playoffs. He and the CAHA decreed that the location of Allan Cup and Memorial Cup games would be chosen based on the greatest profit from gate receipts and reduced travel expenses. The Winnipeg Tribune journalist Ralph Allen felt that the smaller cities in Canada would suffer as a result of the financial shortage, and criticized the CAHA for creating the problem by being self indulgent, spending too much on team travel, and by covering expenses for delegates to attend meetings.

In April 1937, the position of CAHA secretary was made a non-permanent part of the executive. Marples was appointed by the subsequent presidents each year to be the secretary until 1945.

In April 1939, the CAHA observed its silver jubilee at the Royal Alexandra Hotel in Winnipeg. Marples was one of the speakers giving a tribute to the CAHA where 11 of 13 past presidents were the guests of honour. The financial situation had improved by 1939, and Marples oversaw the CAHA assuming full responsibility to finance a national ice hockey team as of the 1940 Winter Olympics.

== Canadian Olympic Committee ==
Marples served as the secretary-treasurer of the Canadian Olympic Committee from 1922 to 1936, and represented the CAHA on the committee. He also served on the AAU of C committees for women's athletics, legislation, and the Canadian Track and field championships.

=== 1924 Summer Olympics ===
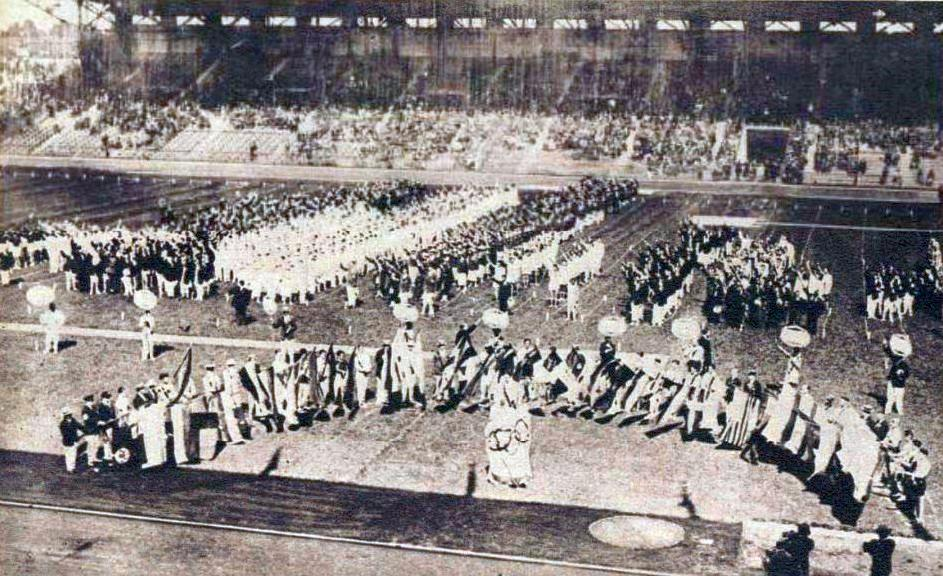
Opening ceremonies of the 1924 Summer Olympics at Stade Olympique de Colombes

In January 1924, Marples announced that sending the Canadian Olympic team to the 1924 Summer Olympics would cost $40,000. He stated that unless the Canadian Olympic Committee could raise $20,000 to $25,000 within a couple months, the national team would be small and not representative of Canadian athletics. He felt that it was the duty of all Canadian citizens to ensure the strongest possible national team was sent the Olympics, and urged contributions from individuals, organizations, and provincial governments.

Canada sent 65 competitors to France to compete in eight Olympic sports. Marples reported that it cost $460 to send each athlete to France, but the Canadian Olympic Committee still had financial reserves despite being approximately $1100 over budget. The AAU of C praised Marples and Canadian Olympic Committee executives for their efforts and assembling the Canadian Olympic team.

=== 1925 to 1932 ===
In December 1925, Marples was part of a delegation of amateur sports organizations who met with Duncan Lloyd McLeod, the Municipal Commissioner of Manitoba, and appealed for the amusement tax on gate receipts of amateur sporting events be repealed.

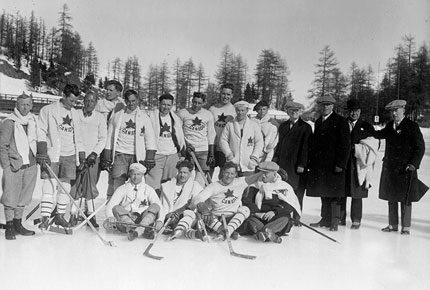
The Toronto Varsity Blues men's ice hockey team representing Canada at the 1928 Winter Olympics

Marples was treasurer of the Canadian national team which won the gold medal in ice hockey at the 1928 Winter Olympics. He sat on the selection committee for the Canadian track and field team at the 1928 Summer Olympics, and travelled with the Olympic team aboard SS Albertic to the Netherlands. He also served as an on-field official in athletics events at the 1928 Summer Olympics and later at the 1930 British Empire Games.

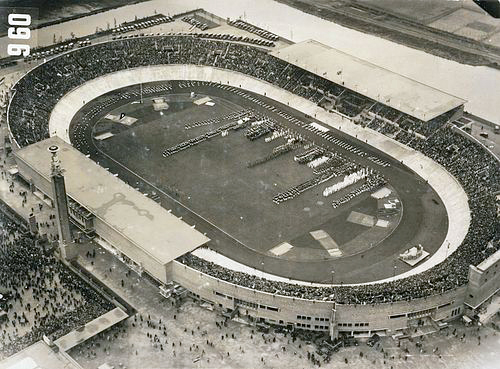
1928 Olympic Stadium in Amsterdam

Marples advocated for the establishment of a club in Winnipeg to support local athletes and raise funds to send them to the Canadian championships and Olympic trials. He emulated the success of the Hamilton Olympic Club which hosted the 1930 British Empire Games and was chairman of the committee to establish a constitution for the Winnipeg club.

Marples was the chairman of a committee of local sports organizations which hosted a banquet for the Winnipeg Hockey Club who won the 1931 Allan Cup, and the Elmwood Millionaires who won the 1931 Memorial Cup. He served as the manager of the Winnipeg Hockey Club when they represented Canada in ice hockey at the 1932 Winter Olympics, then arranged a victory banquet in Winnipeg after the team won the gold medal.

The Manitoba Citizens' Olympic Committee was established in April 1932, with Marples elected as its secretary. He arranged a series of four sporting exhibition events on behalf of the committee to prepare athletes and raise money for the 1932 Summer Olympics. He was part of a group of eight delegates from the Canadian Olympic Committee who lobbied Edgar Nelson Rhodes, the Canadian Minister of Finance, for funds to cover travel expenses for Canadian athletes to the Olympics.

=== 1936 Winter Olympics ===
The Port Arthur Bearcats team was chosen to represent Canada in ice hockey at the 1936 Winter Olympics and was strengthened by additional players from across Canada. The Canadian Olympic Committee and the CAHA removed four members of the Halifax Wolverines from the team after the players were reported to have asked for money to take care of their families while playing in Europe. Marples denied that there had been any agreement to take care of the players' families while they were at the Olympics, and that the Halifax players had left the team voluntarily because they could not get what they wanted in terms of money. The Maritime Amateur Hockey Association was upset with the dismissal of the players and accused the CAHA of misappropriating gate receipts from the 1935 Allan Cup held in Halifax. Marples replied that $11,000 was taken in gate receipts, but that the CAHA spent $6,000 towards transportation and lodging of the visiting teams to Halifax for the finals.

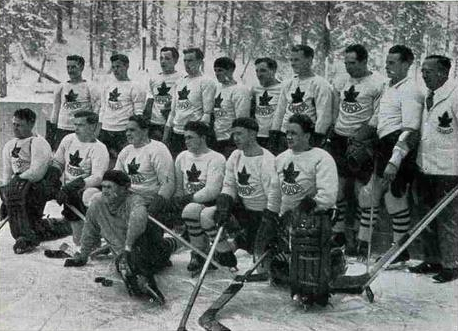
Canada men's national ice hockey team at the 1936 Winter Olympics

Marples was the head of mission for the Canadian delegation to the 1936 Winter Olympics in Germany and oversaw all travel arrangements. He accompanied the national hockey team to Europe aboard RMS Duchess of Atholl, and felt that the 1936 team would be stronger than the 1932 gold medalists. Journalist Lou Marsh reported that the CAHA did not have any representation on the international board of hockey referees, that no Canadian or American referee went with the team to Europe, and that Marples chose to accept only Europeans refereeing during the Olympics.

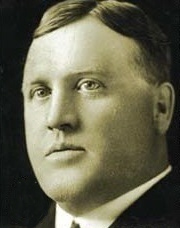
E. A. Gilroy

On the night before the Olympic hockey tournament began, the Ligue Internationale de Hockey sur Glace (LIHG) ruled that Jimmy Foster and Alex Archer were ineligible to play for the Great Britain national team since the players had violated the CAHA's transfer rules by departing for Great Britain without permission. Great Britain's manager Bunny Ahearne contested that international rules at the time allowed a player to leave a country without obtaining permission and that Canada was afraid of losing to Great Britain. Marples and CAHA president E. A. Gilroy were perturbed by accusations that Canada was being unsportsmanlike due to the suspensions, and insisted that the eligibility question had been brought up against their will to give Canada a bad name. Marples and Gilroy maintained that the suspensions had resulted from a CAHA protest to the LIHG in September 1935 rather than any last-minute action. The Canadian Press reported that Canadian officials agreed to lift the suspensions on Foster and Archer after "considerable pressure had been brought to bear on Canadian officials by British Olympic higher-ups".

Great Britain defeated Canada by a 2–1 score during the second round of the tournament, with the loss carried over to the final round which determined the standings for the Olympic medals. After the loss, Marples and Gilroy protested to LIHG president Paul Loicq who denied that the rules were changed. Loicq reiterated that participating nations were briefed on the format twice, and that Canada had only attended one of the two meetings. Canada placed second overall and received the silver medal, while Great Britain ended Canada's streak of winning every gold medal in Olympic hockey as of 1932. The failure to win gold and understand the system used led to the CAHA being heavily scrutinized by the players and the media in Canada. When the national team returned from Europe, players were resentful and bitter towards the CAHA for a lack of leadership. Kenneth Farmer stated that with respect to the playoffs system, Marples and Gilroy were "blissfully unaware of what it was all about". Ralph St. Germain stated that if Canada was seen as unsportsmanlike, "It was largely due to the incessant blustering and bickering of our officials".

=== 1936 Summer Olympics ===
In preparation for the 1936 Summer Olympics in Germany, Marples urged for branches of the AAU of C to raise funds to make the Canadian Olympic team as large as it could be. He stated that the Government of Canada would contribute $10,000 towards the national team, and that the Canadian Olympic Committee sought to maximize profits from the 1936 Canadian Track and Field Championships to provide additional funding for the Olympic team.

== Personal life ==
Marples married his wife Ida c. 1907 – c. 1910, and they had one son, James, born in 1911. Marples's mother was killed at the St. Vital Fair, on August 15, 1924, and the subsequent MAHA executive meeting that month was postponed.

As a merchant, he operated the butcher shop, Marples' Quality Meats, originally on North Main Street then later on Osborne Street in Winnipeg. In politics, he was appointed by the Winnipeg Conservative Association to organize the newly created Winnipeg North federal electoral district in 1914. He moved to Toronto in 1934, was involved in a brokerage business prior to World War II, then became a business partner in machine tool manufacturing.

Marples died in Toronto on January 17, 1945, after having a heart attack. His funeral was held in Winnipeg on January 22, 1945, followed by interment in Elmwood Cemetery in Winnipeg.

== Honours and legacy ==
The CAHA and the MAHA both observed a moment of silence for Marples at their general meetings following his death. CAHA president Frank Sargent said that Marples' death "was a great blow to the CAHA and a great loss to the Canadian hockey world". He felt that Marples was "one of the best officers the CAHA ever had", and had "always found him a guiding and valuable influence".

In 1989, Marples was posthumously inducted as an individual into the builder category of the Manitoba Hockey Hall of Fame. In 2004, he was inducted into both the Manitoba Sports Hall of Fame and the Manitoba Hockey Hall of Fame, as a member of the Winnipeg Monarchs team that won the Allan Cup in 1915.
