= Ryan White (ice hockey) =

Canadian ice hockey player (born 1988)

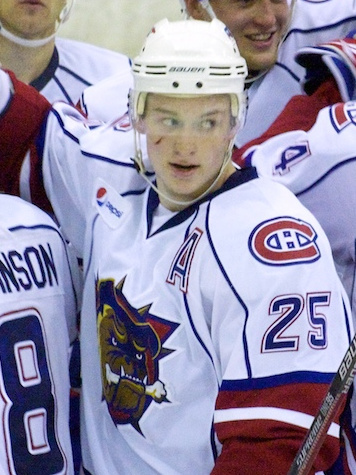
- White during his time with the Hamilton Bulldogs
- Born: March 17, 1988 (age 38) Brandon, Manitoba, Canada
- Height: 6 ft 0 in (183 cm)
- Weight: 200 lb (91 kg; 14 st 4 lb)
- Position: Centre
- Shot: Right
- Played for: Montreal Canadiens; Philadelphia Flyers; Arizona Coyotes; Minnesota Wild
- NHL draft: 66th overall, 2006; Montreal Canadiens
- Playing career: 2008–2021

Ryan White (born March 17, 1988) is a Canadian former professional ice hockey centre. He was selected in the third round, 66th overall, by the Montreal Canadiens in the 2006 NHL entry draft. White also played for the Philadelphia Flyers, Arizona Coyotes and Minnesota Wild.

== Playing career ==
White grew up playing in the Brandon minor hockey system before graduating to the AAA midget level. In his first and only year of AAA, White led his Wheat Kings team to a gold medal at the 2004 Telus Cup.

White spent four seasons, from 2004–05 to 2007–08, in the Western Hockey League with the Calgary Hitmen. He was drafted by the Montreal Canadiens in the third round, 66th overall, in the 2006 NHL entry draft. Following his WHL career, White was assigned to the Canadiens' minor league affiliate, the Hamilton Bulldogs of the American Hockey League (AHL), where he recorded 29 points in 80 games as a rookie in 2008–09.

White made his NHL debut in a call-up to the Montreal Canadiens on November 5, 2009 against the Boston Bruins, recording an assist. He was called up once again for a game against the Ottawa Senators the following month on December 8. After playing in the first period of that game, he was pulled from the game after the NHL noticed he was playing, despite the Canadiens not having properly reported his call-up to the league before the 5 p.m. deadline.

White scored his first NHL goal as part of a Gordie Howe hat trick during a game against the Minnesota Wild on March 20, 2011.

On August 7, 2014, having left the Canadiens organization as a free agent, White signed a one-year, two-way contract with the Philadelphia Flyers.

On July 1, 2016, White signed as a free agent to a one-year deal with the Arizona Coyotes. Adding a physical presence in a depth role to the Coyotes, White added 7 goals and 13 points in 46 games during the 2016–17 season, before he was traded alongside Martin Hanzal and a fourth-round pick in 2017, to the Minnesota Wild in exchange for a 1st-round pick in 2017, 2nd-round pick in 2018, conditional 4th-round pick in 2019, and Grayson Downing on February 26, 2017.

On August 29, 2017, the Vancouver Canucks signed White to a PTO in order to attend training camp. However, on October 7, he was released by the Canucks. With the 2017–18 season underway, White signed a professional tryout contract with the Boston Bruins on October 10. After practicing and travelling with the Bruins for nearly a month, White and the Bruins agreed on a mutual release from his PTO on November 6.

On November 17, 2017, White secured an initial PTO contract with the San Diego Gulls of the AHL, affiliate to the Anaheim Ducks. White appeared in 21 games with the Gulls for 9 points before he was released from his PTO on February 8, 2018. The following day, White was signed to the Iowa Wild on a Standard Player Contract (SPC), marking a return of sorts within the Minnesota Wild organization. He completed the season with Iowa, finishing with 2 goals and 8 points in 23 games.

Remaining as an unsigned free agent into the 2018–19 season, White again continued his professional career in the AHL, securing a professional try-out contract with home province club, the Manitoba Moose, on October 27, 2018.

Approaching the 2019–20 season, White as an unsigned free agent returned to the Manitoba Moose, attending training camp. On October 4, 2019, he was signed to a professional tryout contract in making the opening night roster.

After beginning the 2020–21 season with the Boissevain Border Kings of the Tiger Hills Hockey League (THHL), White signed with the Wichita Thunder of the ECHL on March 30, 2021. He made his debut with the Thunder the following day, April 1.

== Personal life ==
After retiring from playing professional hockey White became assistant coach of the Winkler Flyers of the Manitoba Junior Hockey League. In February, 2022 his son Gordie was diagnosed with diffuse intrinsic pontine glioma, a rare and difficult to treat cancer. A GoFundMe page raised more than $200,000 for his treatment.

== Career statistics ==
=== Regular season and playoffs ===
			Regular season					Playoffs
Season	Team	League	GP	G	A	Pts	PIM	GP	G	A	Pts	PIM
2004–05	Calgary Hitmen	WHL	63	9	14	23	95	12	2	1	3	26
2005–06	Calgary Hitmen	WHL	72	20	33	53	121	13	3	4	7	18
2006–07	Calgary Hitmen	WHL	72	34	55	89	97	18	6	8	14	36
2007–08	Calgary Hitmen	WHL	68	28	44	72	98	16	6	11	17	8
2008–09	Hamilton Bulldogs	AHL	80	11	18	29	68	6	3	1	4	9
2009–10	Hamilton Bulldogs	AHL	62	17	17	34	173	19	4	5	9	47
2009–10	Montreal Canadiens	NHL	16	0	2	2	16	—	—	—	—	—
2010–11	Hamilton Bulldogs	AHL	33	3	9	12	77	13	2	6	8	37
2010–11	Montreal Canadiens	NHL	27	2	3	5	38	7	0	0	0	2
2011–12	Montreal Canadiens	NHL	20	0	3	3	61	—	—	—	—	—
2011–12	Hamilton Bulldogs	AHL	4	4	1	5	26	—	—	—	—	—
2012–13	Montreal Canadiens	NHL	26	1	0	1	67	3	1	0	1	23
2013–14	Montreal Canadiens	NHL	52	2	4	6	50	—	—	—	—	—
2014–15	Lehigh Valley Phantoms	AHL	11	1	2	3	39	—	—	—	—	—
2014–15	Philadelphia Flyers	NHL	34	6	6	12	30	—	—	—	—	—
2015–16	Philadelphia Flyers	NHL	73	11	5	16	101	6	1	0	1	28
2016–17	Arizona Coyotes	NHL	46	7	6	13	70	—	—	—	—	—
2016–17	Minnesota Wild	NHL	19	2	1	3	14	3	0	0	0	4
2017–18	San Diego Gulls	AHL	21	3	6	9	52	—	—	—	—	—
2017–18	Iowa Wild	AHL	23	2	6	8	57	—	—	—	—	—
2018–19	Manitoba Moose	AHL	27	5	2	7	57	—	—	—	—	—
2019–20	Manitoba Moose	AHL	21	2	1	3	87	—	—	—	—	—
2020–21	Boissevain Border Kings	THHL	1	0	0	0	0	—	—	—	—	—
2020–21	Wichita Thunder	ECHL	25	4	5	9	82	2	1	0	1	0
AHL totals			282	48	62	110	636	38	9	12	21	93
NHL totals			313	31	30	61	447	19	2	0	2	57

=== International ===
Year	Team	Event	GP	G	A	Pts	PIM
2005	Canada Western	U17	6	2	9	11	6
Junior totals			6	2	9	11	6

== Awards and honours ==
Award	Year
WHL
East Second All-Star Team	2008
East First All-Star Team	2007
