= Steinbach Huskies =

- City: Steinbach, Manitoba
- League: Junior Huskies; Hanover Tache Junior Hockey League; Senior Huskies; Carillon Senior Hockey League
- Founded: 1920s
- Home arena: T.G. Smith Centre
- Colours: Blue, Black, White

The Steinbach Huskies are a junior and senior ice hockey club based in Steinbach, Manitoba, Canada.

== Senior Huskies ==
Founded in the 1920s, the Senior Huskies have played in several leagues over the years: the Hanover-Tache Hockey League (1953–2003), Manitoba Eastern Hockey League (1969–1977), the Central Amateur Senior Hockey League (1977–1985) and currently the Carillon Hockey League.

In 1978–79, the Huskies captured the Allan Cup Western Canadian title before losing in the national finals.

In 1992–93, the Huskies beat the Niverville Clippers to win the Hanover-Tache Hockey League Championship.

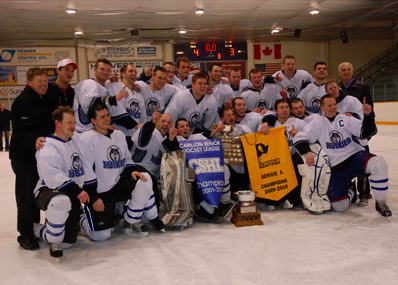
Steinbach Senior Huskies (2009–2010)

The Senior Huskies joined the Carillon Senior Hockey League (CSHL) in 2004 and played in every season, except for leaves of absence taken for the 2006–07, 2017–18, and 2018–19 seasons. They have captured three league championships and also one Manitoba Provincial Senior 'A' championship (2009–10).

=== CSHL Championships ===
- 2009–10
- 2010–11
- 2014–15

== Junior Huskies ==
The Junior Huskies are a founding member of the Hanover Tache Junior Hockey League. The team has won a league-best ten championships, which also makes them ten-time Provincial Junior 'C' champions, as the HTJHL is the only junior 'C' league sanctioned by Hockey Manitoba.

=== HTJHL Championships ===
- 1988–89
- 1989–90
- 2004–05
- 2005–06
- 2006–07
- 2008–09
- 2011–12
- 2013–14
- 2022-23
- 2023-24

== See also ==
- List of ice hockey teams in Manitoba
