= Steinbach Curling Club =

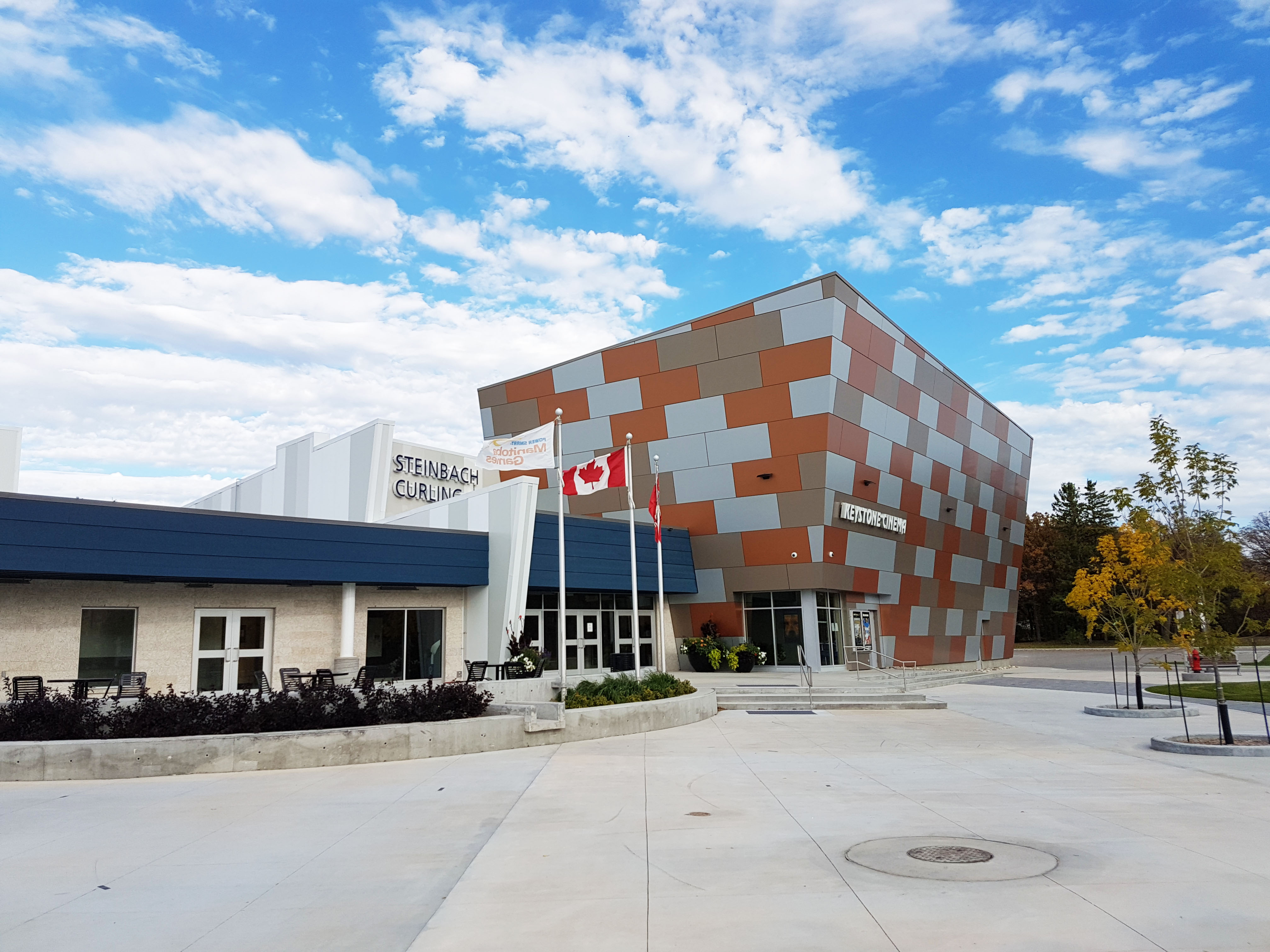
Steinbach Curling Club on the left.

The Steinbach Curling Club is located in Steinbach, Manitoba, Canada. The curling club began in 1948 and was incorporated in 1963.

Its current building opened in October 2014 is located adjacent to the T.G. Smith Centre. The new five-sheet rink replaced the old four-sheet rink located across the street. The former building was torn down by the City of Steinbach in May 2014 to create parking space for Steinbach Credit Union.

The Steinbach Curling Club is the original home of the three-time Manitoba curling champions and one-time Brier winners Vic Peters and Chris Neufeld.
