= Hockey Manitoba =

Canadian amateur ice hockey governing body

- Sport: Ice hockey
- Jurisdiction: Manitoba
- Founded: 1914 as the Manitoba Hockey Commission
- Affiliation: Hockey Canada
- Headquarters: Winnipeg

Official website
- www.hockeymanitoba.ca/information/executive/

Hockey Manitoba is the governing body of amateur ice hockey in the province of Manitoba, Canada. Hockey Manitoba was founded in 1914 as the Manitoba Amateur Hockey Association and is a branch affiliate of Hockey Canada.

As part of its mandate, Hockey Manitoba oversees junior and senior hockey (excluding major junior), minor hockey (through its ten regional branches), provincial championships, officiating programs, and skill development programs for coaches and players, in conjunction with member leagues and minor hockey associations.

== History ==
=== Formation and early years ===
The Allan Cup trophy

Members of the Winnipeg Amateur Hockey League met on June 23, 1914, agreed to form a provisional Manitoba Hockey Commission to oversee hockey in Manitoba, and sought to merge into a national commission when such a body became established. The suggestion to form a governing body for hockey in Canada was made by Claude C. Robinson, the trustee for the Allan Cup in Western Canada, and was echoed by similar calls from The Winnipeg Tribune and the Winnipeg Free Press. During the 1914 Allan Cup playoffs earlier in the year, the Winnipeg Amateur Hockey League and Allan Cup trustees debated the eligibility of players based on whether leagues were senior ice hockey, or a lower level of intermediate hockey, and struggled without an authoritative national body to classify leagues.

On July 7, 1914, the Manitoba Hockey Commission was founded, with Winnipeg Amateur Hockey League executives W. F. Taylor and Fred Marples elected as the first president and secretary-treasurer respectively. Marples and Robinson sent letters to other clubs and leagues in Canada and advocated for establishment of the national commission. In November 1914, the commission laid plans for a national meeting, sought for the Allan Cup to be recognized as the championship trophy for amateur hockey in Canada, and that the national commission be the authority to decide on which leagues and players were eligible. The Canadian Amateur Hockey Association (CAHA) was founded on December 4, 1914, with Taylor elected as its first president, and the Allan Cup was chosen to represent the CAHA championship.

Taylor presided over the first annual meeting of the Manitoba Hockey Commission on December 26, 1914, which saw its named changed to become the Manitoba Amateur Hockey Association (MAHA) to align with the CAHA. The MAHA ratified the player registration rules put in place by the CAHA to maintain amateurism and exclude professionals, and sought to expand within Manitoba by recruiting existing leagues to join.

During World War I, the MAHA joined other athletic organizations in Manitoba to form an Athletic Patriotic Committee to support the war effort in Canada, and arranged sporting events for patriotic fundraising. Taylor was re-elected president of the MAHA in November 1915 and continued hockey in Manitoba to support the patriotic fund.

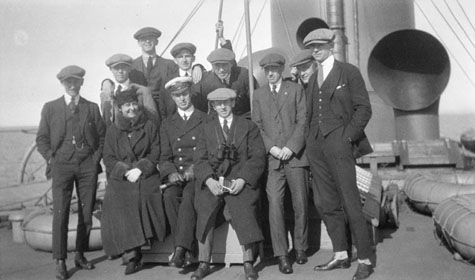
Winnipeg Falcons en route to the 1920 Olympics

The Winnipeg Falcons won the 1920 Allan Cup and were chosen to represent Canada in ice hockey at the 1920 Summer Olympics in Belgium. The Falconsbecame the first gold medalists in ice hockey at the Olympic Games, and were feted with a banquet arranged by the MAHA upon the team's return to Winnipeg.

In the early years of the MAHA, schedules for the Manitoba Senior Hockey League were handled by the operators of the rinks. After disagreements on schedules for the 1922–23 season, president Toby Sexsmith reserved the right for the MAHA to decide on which teams would participate in the league after Winnipeg Amphitheatre ownership was unable to get an agreement on a league schedule.

=== 1927 to 1934 ===
E. A. Gilroy was elected president in 1927. A letter by him was published in the Winnipeg Free Press, in which he reiterated his commitment to expanding senior ice hockey in Manitoba, and restoring it to the prominence it had before rosters were depleted by professional teams. He was open to university teams participating in the Manitoba Senior Hockey League, wanted to work with owners of the Winnipeg Amphitheatre on schedules, and address concerns of attendance figures and travel costs to games outside of Winnipeg. He also sought to keep teams based in the MAHA as opposed to playing in neighbouring districts such as the Thunder Bay Amateur Hockey Association.

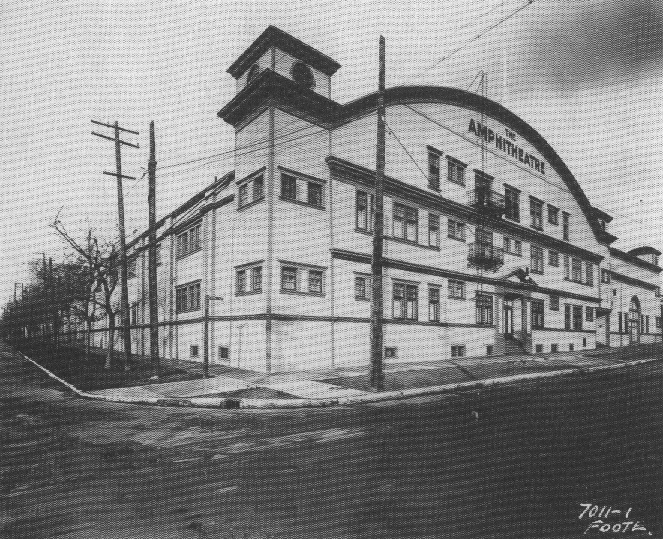
Winnipeg Amphitheatre

The 1927–28 season had the greatest number of hockey teams in Manitoba at the time, with the most growth in rural areas. Gilroy advocated for support of leagues based in rural areas to grow interest in the game, and since those teams could not raise funds to travel long distances to play in larger cities. He wanted to shorten the provincial playoffs system which extended play into poor ice conditions later in the season. As growth increased, he sought to educate teams and players in Manitoba that registration requirements including transfers between clubs would be enforced in the 1928–29 season, and published letters in newspapers advising of changes to consistent with new amateur regulations across Canada.

The MAHA implemented upper and lower divisions in the Manitoba Senior Hockey League for the 1929–30 season, and received more applications from teams in Winnipeg than ice availability could support. The MAHA arranged for all of the upper division teams to play in Winnipeg to reduce travel costs, and expanded the lower division with teams from Brandon, Elkhorn, Souris, and Virden.

The MAHA faced a revolt from teams in the Manitoba Senior Hockey League before the 1932–33 season, when the Winnipeg Hockey Club, the Winnipeg Falcons and the Selkirk Hockey Club withdrew and formed a commercial league in protest of the Brandon Wheat City Hockey Club being admitted. Gilroy announced that any player taking part in the new commercial league would be suspended from the MAHA, and be ineligible for the Allan Cup playoffs. After a week of negotiations, an agreement was reached where the Winnipeg Monarchs and Winnipeg Hockey Club merged, and the Manitoba Senior Hockey League operated with four teams including Brandon. Gilroy retired as president in 1934, after his tenure oversaw continued growth of the association and improvement of finances.

=== 1945 to 1950 ===
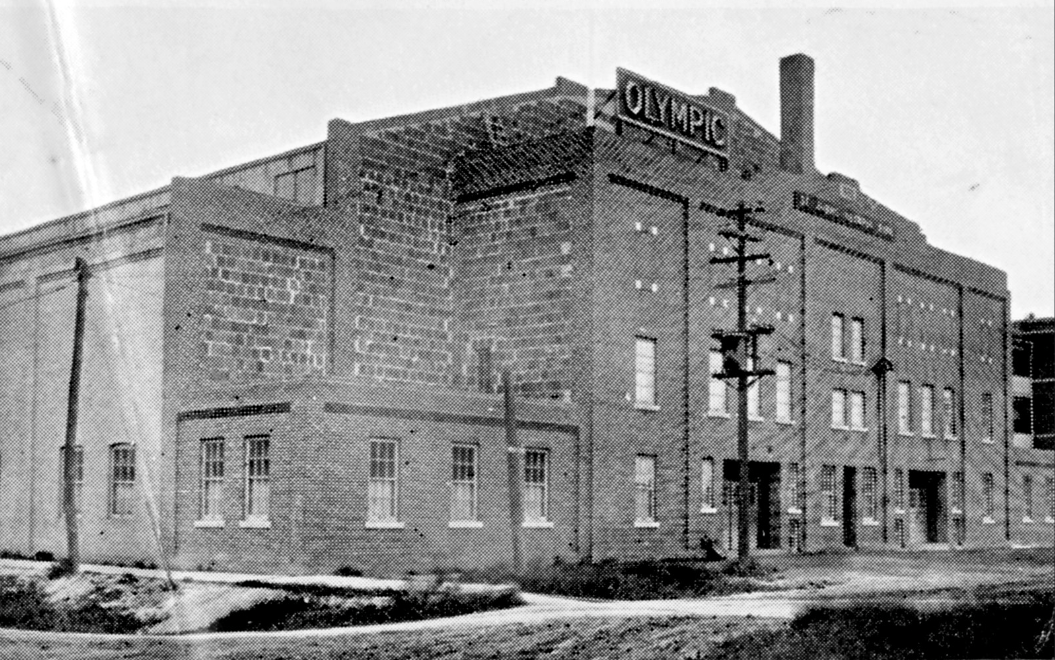
Olympic Rink

Jimmy Dunn served as president from 1945 to 1950. He was immediately faced with an ultimatum from the north division teams of the Manitoba Junior Hockey League (MJHL) who threatened to withdraw from the MAHA unless several demands were met. The teams felt that the south division was given preferential treatment, and sought to equally share games at the larger Winnipeg Amphitheatre and the profits from gate receipts. The north division complained about the lack of available ice time for practices and the deplorable dressing room conditions at the Olympic Rink, and felt that the MAHA had an obligation to make the upgrades if the rink would not. The Winnipeg Tribune reported that the concerns had developed over years of mismanagement and that Dunn committed the MAHA to discussing issues openly instead of closed-door meetings without the local press invited. After negotiations broke down, three junior teams withdrew and the MJHL operated with five teams in one division. Despite the loss of teams, MAHA registrations grew by more than 600 players and profits increased sixfold.

The stronger MJHL teams — the Winnipeg Rangers, Winnipeg Monarchs, Brandon Wheat Kings and Portage Terriers — were sponsored by National Hockey League clubs and wanted to form an "A" division and play all games at the Winnipeg Amphitheatre for the 1946–47 season, and relegate all other teams to the "B" division at the Olympic Rink. The four teams were also opposed to any other teams being added to their division. The Winnipeg Tribune felt that these teams had pursued their own selfish interests with disregard for the general welfare of the league, and that creating the division would perpetuate the previous issues unless Dunn could negotiate a "minor miracle". Dunn and the MAHA executive chose to include the St. James Orioles as a fifth team in the "A" division after being convinced that the team was soundly operated and would be able to compete.

The MAHA implemented a 10-minute overtime period for all tied games as of the 1946–47 season. During the same season, the MAHA executive encouraged construction of community rinks and targeted rural regions of Manitoba for growth. The MAHA also divided the juvenile, midget and bantam age groups of minor hockey into tiers, to give teams based in rural Manitoba an opportunity to enter the provincial playoffs at a lower calibre than urban teams. The MAHA established a "C" division of the MJHL to play at the Olympic Rink and retain more players who had graduated from minor hockey. Dunn felt that the 1947–48 season had been the most successful yet, praised rural communities for building rinks, and sought more rural leagues to operate for the whole season instead of forming a team solely for the provincial playoffs.

By the 1949–50 season, registrations with the MAHA had grown to exceed 4,000 players and included 125 teams outside of Winnipeg for the intermediate and minor hockey playoffs. Grants by the MAHA for the development of minor ice hockey in Manitoba grew from C$1,525 in 1946, to more than $6,000 by the end of the 1949–50 season. The Winnipeg Free Press wrote that Dunn's presidency coincided with the MAHA's biggest growth and best financial situation that was driven by profits from the junior ice hockey playoffs.

=== 1958 to 1963 ===
Earl Dawson was elected president in 1958. The MAHA had its greatest registration to date and sought to reimburse teams in rural Manitoba for the cost of developing players lost to the MJHL who in turn profited by selling players to professional teams. Dawson planned to promote and raise funds for minor ice hockey with a Minor Hockey Week in January 1959. Five years later, the MAHA had grown to be the country's third largest provincial association by registration and spent more per capita to develop minor ice hockey than other provinces in Canada. Journalist Laurie Artiss stated that the Rural Minor Hockey Council established by Dawson had succeeded in reversing the decline of hockey in rural Manitoba by enforcing geographical limits on where the bigger cities could claim players, which resulted in players staying in smaller towns and gave more children a chance to play locally.

Dawson and the MAHA sought a better financial arrangement with the Saskatchewan Amateur Hockey Association to recuperate the costs of developing minor hockey players and on-ice officials in Flin Flon, after the Flin Flon Bombers affiliated with the Saskatchewan Junior Hockey League (SJHL) instead of the MJHL. When the Brandon Wheat Kings also wanted to play in the SJHL, the MAHA renegotiated the financial arrangement to prevent the loss of another team to an out-of-province league. In December 1961, a fire destroyed the home arena of the Prince Albert Mintos of the SJHL, and the MAHA allowed the team to move to Dauphin, Manitoba, and levied a fee of 10 per cent of ticket sales to cover lost revenue for displacing the existing senior team in Dauphin.

=== 1964 to present ===
In the 2024–25 season, Hockey Canada and its four western affiliates – BC Hockey, Hockey Alberta, Hockey Saskatchewan and Hockey Manitoba – piloted the Western Canadian Development Model (WCDM). Under the WCDM, junior leagues adopted most of the Western Hockey League rulebook, excluding some sections, and restrictions on 15-year-old affiliate players in the Western Hockey League were loosened. Players that will be 18-years of age or older in the calendar year are allowed to choose whether to use full-face protection or half-face protection, whilst younger players will be required to use full-face protection.

The WCDM was expanded in the 2025–26 season to include the following rules changes:

- Western Junior A teams will be permitted to register up to five U.S.-born players at one time on their active roster, a decrease from the previous six.
- 16- and 17-year-old U.S.-born players who have been drafted, listed or signed by a WHL team will be eligible to be rostered by any Western Junior A team.
- Each Western Junior A team will be eligible to roster one 16- or 17-year-old player whose parent(s) reside(s) outside of their province or region, if the player has been drafted, listed or signed by a WHL team
  - Up to a maximum of 23 such players across all Western Junior A teams, or one player from each WHL team.
- Out-of-province players who participate in the Canadian Sport School Hockey League (CSSHL) will be eligible to affiliate with Western Junior A teams in their school's respective province or region.
- No more than eight players born in a province not participating in the WCDM may be registered on the active roster of a Western Junior A team.

=== MAHA executives ===
Notable executives of the MAHA:

Presidents:

- W. F. Taylor (1914–1916)
- Toby Sexsmith (1921–1923)
- E. A. Gilroy (1927–1934)
- Jimmy Dunn (1945–1950)
- Earl Dawson (1958–1963)
- Frank McKinnon (1970–1975)

Vice-presidents:

- Claude C. Robinson (1916–1917)

Secretary-treasurers:

- Fred Marples (1914–1934)

== Leagues ==
Senior

- South Eastern Manitoba Hockey League
- Tiger Hills Hockey League

Junior

- Manitoba Junior Hockey League (Junior 'A')
- Capital Region Junior Hockey League (Junior 'B')
- Keystone Junior Hockey League (Junior 'B')
- Hanover Tache Junior Hockey League (Junior 'C')
- Manitoba Major Junior Hockey League (Junior 'OA')

Minor Hockey

- Manitoba U-18 'AAA' Hockey League
- Manitoba Female Hockey League

Women's

- Manitoba Women's Junior Hockey League
- Winnipeg Women's Hockey League

=== Defunct ===
- Carillon Senior Hockey League (Senior)
- Hanover-Tache Hockey League (Senior)
- Manitoba Senior Hockey League (1946–1972) (Senior)
- Manitoba Senior Hockey League (2007–2016) (Senior)
- Central Manitoba Junior Hockey League (Junior A')
- NorMan Junior Hockey League (Junior 'A')
- Northwest Junior Hockey League (Junior 'B')

== Provincial championships ==
- Turnbull Cup (Junior 'A')
- Baldy Northcott Trophy (Junior 'B')
- Pattison Cup (Senior 'AAA')
- Manitoba Senior 'A' Provincial Championship (Senior 'A')
- Jack Forsyth League Trophy (Midget 'AAA')
- Hockey Manitoba Cup (Adult Recreational)

== Regional minor hockey associations ==
Region	Main Centre(s)
Hockey Brandon	Brandon
Central Plains Minor Hockey Association	Portage la Prairie
Eastman Minor Hockey Association	Beausejour, Ste. Anne, Steinbach
Interlake Minor Hockey Association	Arborg, Gimli, Stonewall
Norman Minor Hockey Association	Thompson, Flin Flon, The Pas
Parkland Minor Hockey Association	Dauphin, Swan River
Pembina Minor Hockey Association	Morden, Winkler
Westman South Minor Hockey Association	Souris, Virden
Hockey Winnipeg	Winnipeg, Selkirk
Yellowhead Minor Hockey Association	Minnedosa, Neepawa

== See also ==
- List of ice hockey teams in Manitoba
- Manitoba Hockey Association
