= Manitoba U-18 'AAA' Hockey League =

- Sport: Ice hockey
- Founded: 1985
- First season: 1985–86
- No. of teams: 12
- Most recent champion: Winnipeg Wild
- Most titles: Winnipeg Wild (13)
- Related competitions: Telus Cup
- Website: mbu18aaahockey.ca

The Manitoba U-18 'AAA' Hockey League (MU18HL), formerly the Manitoba Midget 'AAA' Hockey League, is an ice hockey league in the province of Manitoba, Canada. It is the highest level of minor hockey in the province. The league operates under the supervision of Hockey Manitoba.

== History ==
The league was founded in 1985 and provides elite hockey players in Manitoba the opportunity to play at a high level of competition. The league is heavily scouted by the Western Hockey League, Junior 'A' teams, and NCAA programs. A number of players have gone to play in these leagues and the majority of Manitobans playing professional hockey have played in the 'AAA' league.

== Teams ==
All teams are regionally based and are operated by Hockey Manitoba's regional minor hockey associations, with the exception of the Kenora Thistles, who are affiliated with Hockey Northwestern Ontario. The Winnipeg region has the option to field multiple teams. Players for each of the teams are selected from the local minor hockey associations within their respective regions.

Team	Centre	League Titles	National Titles	First Season	Previous Team Name
Brandon Midget Wheat Kings	Brandon	4	1	1985–86	
Central Plains Capitals	Portage la Prairie	0	0	1989–90	
Eastman Selects	Steinbach	3	0	1986–87	
Interlake Lightning	Teulon	0	0	1985–86	Interlake Raiders (1985–88)
Kenora Thistles	Kenora, ON	1	0	1986–87	Kenora Boise (1986–95), Kenora Stars (1995-04)
Norman Northstars	Thompson	1	0	1986–87	
Parkland Rangers	Dauphin	0	0	1990–91	
Pembina Valley Hawks	Morden	3	0	1985–86	
Southwest Cougars	Souris	2	0	1985–86	
Winnipeg Bruins	Winnipeg	0	0	2017–18	
Winnipeg Thrashers	Winnipeg	3	1	1993–94	Winnipeg Sharks (1993-04)
Winnipeg Wild	Winnipeg	13	0	1985–86	Winnipeg Saints (1985–89), Winnipeg Warriors (1989-03)
Yellowhead Chiefs	Shoal Lake	1	0	1987–88	

=== Former Teams ===
- Parkland Stars (1985–87)
- River East Royals (1985–87)
- St. James Canadians (1985–87)
- Winnipeg Stars (1986–87), Winnipeg Hawks (1987-03)
- Winnipeg Monarchs (1985–89; 1992–94), Winnipeg Mavericks (1989–92)

== League Champions ==
The league champion is awarded the Jack Forsyth Trophy, which is named after a former league commissioner. The MU18HL playoffs are also to determine the provincial championship for Manitoba (teams based outside of Manitoba are not eligible for the Manitoba championship).

Year	Jack Forsyth Trophy winner	Runner-up	Telus Cup West Regional
1986	Winnipeg Saints	Pembina Valley Hawks	
1987	Winnipeg Saints	Southwest Cougars	
1988	Winnipeg Saints	Southwest Cougars	
1989	Eastman Selects	Yellowhead Chiefs	
1990	Winnipeg Mavericks	Brandon Wheat Kings	
1991	Winnipeg Hawks	Norman Northstars	Winner
1992	Winnipeg Hawks	Brandon Wheat Kings	
1993	Kenora Boise (Note: The 1993 league champion (Kenora) was a team based outside of Manitoba; the Manitoba championship was awarded to the runners-up (Winnipeg Hawks).)	Winnipeg Hawks	
1994	Yellowhead Chiefs	Winnipeg Hawks	
1995	Brandon Wheat Kings	Parkland Rangers	
1996	Norman Northstars	Yellowhead Chiefs	
1997	Pembina Valley Hawks	Eastman Selects	
1998	Southwest Cougars	Pembina Valley Hawks	
1999	Southwest Cougars	Pembina Valley Hawks	
2000	Eastman Selects	Winnipeg Warriors	
2001	Winnipeg Warriors	Pembina Valley Hawks	
2002	Eastman Selects	Winnipeg Sharks	
2003	Brandon Wheat Kings	Winnipeg Sharks	
2004	Brandon Wheat Kings	Winnipeg Thrashers	Winner
2005	Winnipeg Wild	Pembina Valley Hawks	
2006	Winnipeg Thrashers	Pembina Valley Hawks	
2007	Brandon Wheat Kings	Winnipeg Thrashers	
2008	Winnipeg Thrashers	Pembina Valley Hawks	Winner
2009	Winnipeg Wild	Winnipeg Thrashers	
2010	Pembina Valley Hawks	Eastman Selects	
2011	Winnipeg Thrashers	Southwest Cougars	Winner
2012	Winnipeg Wild	Southwest Cougars	
2013	Winnipeg Wild	Winnipeg Thrashers	
2014	Winnipeg Wild	Eastman Selects	
2015	Pembina Valley Hawks	Brandon Wheat Kings	
2016	Winnipeg Wild	Eastman Selects	
2017	Winnipeg Wild	Yellowhead Chiefs	
2018	Winnipeg Wild	Brandon Wheat Kings	
2019	Brandon Wheat Kings	Winnipeg Wild	
2020	no champion (Note: Playoffs cancelled due to coronavirus pandemic)		
2021	no champion		
2022	Winnipeg Wild	Brandon Wheat Kings	
2023	Winnipeg Wild		
2024	Brandon Wheat Kings	Winnipeg Wild	Runner Up
2025	Winnipeg Wild	Brandon Wheat Kings	
2026	Winnipeg Bruins	Brandon Wheat Kings	

== Telus Cup Playoffs ==
The Manitoba champion earns a berth to the West Regional Championship and competes against the champions from Saskatchewan and Northwestern Ontario. The winner advances to the national Telus Cup, known as the Air Canada Cup until 2003 .

MU18HL teams have hosted the national championships three times: the Brandon Wheat Kings in 1994, the Winnipeg Thrashers in 2009 (in Selkirk), and the Kenora Stars in 2004. Winnipeg hosted the inaugural national championship in 1979, before the MU18HL was formed.

=== National Championship Appearances ===
- 1991 – Winnipeg Hawks representing West Region
- 1994 – Brandon Wheat Kings as host team
- 2004 – Kenora Stars as host team; Brandon Wheat Kings representing West Region Gold Medalist
- 2008 – Winnipeg Thrashers representing West Region Silver Medalist
- 2009 – Winnipeg Thrashers as host team
- 2011 – Winnipeg Thrashers representing West Region Gold Medalist

== Alumni ==
=== National Hockey League Players ===
- Mark Kolesar
- Tyler Arnason
- Arron Asham
- Drew Bagnall
- Cam Barker
- Rick Berry
- Troy Bodie
- Lonny Bohonos
- Madison Bowey
- Dustin Boyd
- Sven Butenschon
- Matt Calvert
- Brad Chartrand
- Riley Cote
- Nigel Dawes
- Cody Eakin
- Pat Falloon
- Eric Fehr
- Morgan Geekie
- Chay Genoway
- Scott Glennie
- Lee Goren
- Travis Hamonic
- Darren Helm
- Shane Hnidy
- Brett Howden
- Quinton Howden
- Daemon Hunt
- Trevor Kidd
- Brendan Leipsic
- Brett Lernout
- Cameron Mann
- Derek Meech
- Marty Murray
- Chris Nielsen
- Colton Orr
- Nolan Patrick
- Calvin Pickard
- Chet Pickard
- Chris Pronger
- Sean Pronger
- James Reimer
- Mike Richards
- Russ Romaniuk
- Aaron Rome
- Travis Sanheim
- Mark Stone
- Michael Stone
- Jonathan Toews
- Ian White
- Ryan White
- Colin Wilson

=== Other ===
- Corey Koskie, former Major League Baseball player
- Daren Millard, sportscaster
