= 2004 Telus Cup =

2004 National Midget Championship
Tournament details
- Venue: Kenora Recreation Centre in Kenora, ON
- Dates: April 18–25, 2004
- Teams: 6

Final positions
- Champions: Brandon Wheat Kings
- Runners-up: Riverains du Collège Charles-Lemoyne
- Third place: Red Deer Chiefs

Tournament statistics
- Scoring leader: Francis Paré (11G 3A 14P)

Awards
- MVP: Francis Paré

The 2004 National Midget Championship was Canada's 26th annual national midget 'AAA' hockey championship, played April 18–25, 2004 at Kenora, Ontario. The Brandon Wheat Kings defeated the Riverains du Collège Charles-Lemoyne 2-1 in overtime to win their first and only national title. It also marked the first time that a Manitoba team was the national midget champion.

This was the only season that Hockey Canada did not have a sponsor for the national midget championship. From 1979 to 2003, it was known as the Air Canada Cup. Later in 2004, a new sponsor would be found and the midget championship would be renamed the Telus Cup.

== Teams ==
Result	Team	Region	City
1st place, gold medalist(s)	Brandon Wheat Kings	West	Brandon, MB
2nd place, silver medalist(s)	Riverains du Collège Charles-Lemoyne	Quebec	Sainte-Catherine, QC
3rd place, bronze medalist(s)	Red Deer Optimist Chiefs	Pacific	Red Deer, AB
4	Kenora Stars	Host	Kenora, ON
5	Cornwall Thunder	Atlantic	Cornwall, PE
6	Toronto Marlboros	Central	Toronto, ON

== Round robin ==
=== Standings ===
Pos	Team	Pld	W	L	D	GF	GA	GD	Pts
1	Riverains du Collège Charles-Lemoyne	5	5	0	0	29	12	+17	10
2	Red Deer Optimist Chiefs	5	4	1	0	19	14	+5	8
3	Brandon Wheat Kings	5	2	2	1	18	17	+1	5
4	Kenora Stars	5	1	3	1	8	19	−11	3
5	Cornwall Thunder	5	1	4	0	16	23	−7	2
6	Toronto Marlboros	5	1	4	0	16	21	−5	2

=== Scores ===
- Red Deer 6 - Brandon 5 (OT)
- Collège Charles-Lemoyne 5 - Cornwall 2
- Toronto 5 - Kenora 1
- Collège Charles-Lemoyne 5 - Brandon 4 (OT)
- Red Deer 3 - Toronto 1
- Kenora 5 - Cornwall 2
- Collège Charles-Lemoyne 6 - Toronto 2
- Brandon 5 - Cornwall 3
- Red Deer 4 - Kenora 1
- Cornwall 7 - Toronto 5
- Collège Charles-Lemoyne 5 - Red Deer 3
- Brandon 0 - Kenora 0
- Red Deer 3 - Cornwall 2 (OT)
- Brandon 4 - Toronto 3
- Collège Charles-Lemoyne 8 - Kenora 1

== Playoffs ==
=== Semi-finals ===
- Collège Charles-Lemoyne 2 - Kenora 1
- Brandon 6 - Red Deer 2

=== Bronze-medal game ===
- Red Deer 5 - Kenora 2

=== Gold-medal game ===
- Brandon 2 - Collège Charles-Lemoyne 1 (OT)

== Individual awards ==
- Most Valuable Player: Francis Paré (Collège Charles-Lemoyne)
- Top Scorer: Francis Paré (Collège Charles-Lemoyne)
- Top Forward: Tyler Dittmer (Brandon)
- Top Defenceman: Jeff Termineski (Toronto)
- Top Goaltender: Tyler Gordon (Kenora)
- Most Sportsmanlike Player: Kyle Dorowicz (Red Deer)

== See also ==
- Telus Cup
