= Hanover-Taché Hockey League =

The Hanover-Taché Hockey League was a senior/intermediate ice hockey league that operated in southeastern Manitoba, Canada, from 1953 to 2005.

The league's name was derived from the two municipalities (Hanover and Taché) where several of its teams were located. Among the league's more notable clubs were the Île-des-Chênes North Stars (2003 Allan Cup champions) and Steinbach Huskies (1979 Allan Cup finalists).

Many of the league's former clubs now play in the Carillon Senior Hockey League, which was formed in 2003.

== Teams ==
- Grunthal Red Wings
- East St. Paul Kings
- Île-des-Chênes North Stars
- La Broquerie Habs
- Landmark Dutchmen
- Mitchell Mohawks
- Niverville Clippers
- Pine Falls Paper Kings
- St. Adolphe Hawks
- Ste. Anne Aces
- St. Jean Royals
- St. Malo Warriors
- St. Pierre Canadiens
- St. Pierre 59ers
- East Steinbach Eagles
- Steinbach Huskies
- Warroad Lakers

== See also ==
- Carillon Senior Hockey League
- Hanover Tache Junior Hockey League
