= Tiger Hills Hockey League =

Canadian senior ice hockey league

The logo used by the Tiger Hills Hockey League.

The Tiger Hills Hockey League (THHL) is a senior ice hockey league that operates in the southwestern region of Manitoba, Canada. The league was formed on October 6, 1982, and first began play in the 1983-1984 hockey season.

It operates under the sanction of Hockey Manitoba, the provincial branch of Hockey Canada. The league champion advances to the Manitoba Senior 'A' Provincial Championship.

Select regular season and playoff games are broadcast on Boissevain-based radio station CJRB.

== Teams ==
=== Active teams ===
- Boissevain Border Kings
- Carberry Plainsmen
- Cartwright Clippers
- Deloraine Royals
- Gladstone Lakers
- Hartney Blues
- Killarney Shamrocks
- MacGregor Wild
- Melita Bisons
- Miniota/Elkhorn C-Hawks
- Minnedosa Bombers
- Neepawa Farmers
- Rivers Jets
- Souris Elks
- Pilot Mound Pilots
- Virden Oil Kings
- Wawanesa Jets

=== Defunct or inactive teams ===
- Baldur Barons
- Carberry Plainsmen
- Cartwright-Baldur Clippers
- Glenboro Nordics
- Holland Rockets
- Shilo Stags
- Swan Lake Cougars

 Gladstone Lakers

== League champions ==
=== Year ===	=== Team ===
1983/1984	Baldur Barons
1984/1985	Pilot Mound Pilots
1985/1986	Pilot Mound Pilots
1986/1987	Baldur Barons
1987/1988	Pilot Mound Pilots
1988/1989	Pilot Mound Pilots
1989/1990	Wawanesa Jets
1990/1991	Holland Rockets
1991/1992	Holland Rockets
1992/1993	Holland Rockets
1993/1994	Killarney Shamrocks
1994/1995	Cartwright-Baldur Clippers
1995/1996	Holland Rockets
1996/1997	Carberry Plainsmen
1997/1998	Holland Rockets
1998/1999	Glenboro Nordics
1999/2000	Not Awarded
2000/2001	Pilot Mound Pilots
2001/2002	Pilot Mound Pilots
2002/2003	Pilot Mound Pilots
2003/2004	Pilot Mound Pilots
2004/2005	Pilot Mound Pilots
2005/2006	Gladstone Lakers
2006/2007	Gladstone Lakers
2007/2008	Pilot Mound Pilots
2008/2009	Swan Lake Cougars
2009/2010	Swan Lake Cougars
2010/2011	Neepawa Farmers
2011/2012	Killarney Shamrocks
2012/2013	Souris Elks
2013/2014	Deloraine Royals
2014/2015	Deloraine Royals
2015/2016	Killarney Shamrocks
2016/2017	Killarney Shamrocks
2017/2018	Gladstone Lakers
2018/2019	Boissevain Border Kings
2019/2020	No champion named (Covid-19)
2020/2021	No champion named (Covid-19)
2021/2022	Boissevain Border Kings
2022/2023	Miniota/Elkhorn C-Hawks
2023/2024	Miniota/Elkhorn C-Hawks
