= 1979 Allan Cup =

Canadian senior ice hockey championship

The Allan Cup trophy

The 1979 Allan Cup was the Canadian senior ice hockey championship for the 1978–79 season. The final was contested by the Petrolia Squires of Ontario and the Steinbach Huskies of Manitoba, the Eastern and Western Canadian champions respectively. The series was played in Sarnia, Ontario, with the Squires winning four games to one to capture the Allan Cup for the first time.

== Teams ==
The Petrolia Squires represented the Eastern Canadian side of the Allan Cup final, while the Steinbach Huskies represented the West.

The Squires played their home games during the series at Sarnia Arena rather than in Petrolia. A 2024 account of the team's championship notes that the Sarnia arena was larger than the arena in Petrolia.

The Steinbach Huskies were the 1978–79 Allan Cup Western finalists from Manitoba. Steinbach Sports Heritage lists the 1978–79 Huskies as Allan Cup finalists.

== Final series ==
The final was played as a best-of-seven series in Sarnia. Petrolia won the series four games to one.

1979 Allan Cup final
Game	Date	Home	Score	Away	Notes
1	April 29, 1979	Petrolia Squires	6–5	Steinbach Huskies	
2	April 30, 1979	Petrolia Squires	7–3	Steinbach Huskies	OT
3	May 1, 1979	Steinbach Huskies	5–4	Petrolia Squires	
4	May 2, 1979	Petrolia Squires	7–1	Steinbach Huskies	
5	May 4, 1979	Petrolia Squires	6–1	Steinbach Huskies	

The Squires won the first two games before Steinbach won Game 3. Petrolia then won the fourth and fifth games to take the championship. The fifth game, played on May 4 at Sarnia Arena, gave Petrolia its first Allan Cup championship.

The series scores were 6–5, 7–3 in overtime, 5–4, 7–1 and 6–1 in favour of Petrolia.

== Result ==
The Petrolia Squires defeated the Steinbach Huskies four games to one and won the 1979 Allan Cup. It was the first Allan Cup championship in the history of the Squires.
