= Carillon Senior Hockey League =

Canadian men's ice hockey league

- Sport: ice hockey
- First season: 2003-04
- Folded: 2022
- No. of teams: 2
- Last champion: Ste. Anne Aces (2019)
- Most titles: Ste. Anne Aces (5)
- Related competitions: Manitoba Senior 'A' Provincial Championship
- Website: cshl.info

Carillon Senior Hockey League was a Canadian senior men's ice hockey league that played out of southeastern Manitoba. It was affiliated with Hockey Manitoba, the provincial branch of Hockey Canada.

== History ==
The league was created in 2003 on the premise that local teams should have local players. The existing senior league at the time, the Hanover-Taché Hockey League (HTHL), included a large number of imported players. During its first season, the CSHL was operated as an independent league and did not have accreditation from Hockey Manitoba. Three teams competed that season (Landmark Dutchmen, Mitchell Mohawks, Ste. Anne Aces) with Mitchell winning the championship.

In its second season, the CSHL was accepted by Hockey Manitoba. The league doubled to six teams, with the Grunthal Red Wings, St. Adolphe Hawks and Steinbach Huskies being accepted. Mitchell once again won the championship.

Prior to the third season, the rival HTHL folded, and two teams joined the CSHL: the La Broquerie Habs and St. Malo Warriors. This brought the league total of teams to eight. The La Broquerie Habs defeated the Ste Anne Aces in four-straight games to claim the league championship.

In its fourth season, the Steinbach Huskies went on hiatus while the Landmark Dutchmen folded, leaving the league with six teams yet again. The La Broquerie Habs defeated Ste. Anne in five games to claim their second straight league title. In provincial competition, the La Broquerie Habs won the Manitoba Senior 'A' provincial championship.

The Steinbach Huskies rejoined the league for the 2007-08 season, while Grunthal Red Wings went on hiatus. This season produced a new champion, the Ste. Anne Aces, who defeated St. Malo in seven games to become the champions.

The following season, it was the St. Malo Warriors that ended a 21-year championship drought and captured their first CSHL title. The final was a rather quick series as St. Malo won in five games, winning the cup at home against the Ste. Anne Aces. The 2008-09 season was a special year for hockey in St. Malo as both the Senior Warriors and the Junior 'B' Warriors of the Keystone Junior Hockey League captured their respective titles in the same year for the first time in the town's history.

In 2009-10 season, the Steinbach Huskies won both the CSHL championship and the Manitoba Provincial 'A' Championship. The Huskies followed up their provincial championship by defeating La Broqerie in the seventh game of the finals the following day. Captain Mike Martens scored with 3:13 left in the third period to clinch the victory. The championship was a first for the Steinbach team in the CSHL, and the first local league title since the Huskies won the Hanover-Tache Hockey League in 1993-94. The Huskies repeated as champions the following season.

In only their second season in the CSHL, the Niverville Clippers captured their first league title in 2012, sweeping La Broquerie in four games.

The CSHL's last season of play was 2019-20. After two cancelled seasons due to the coronavirus pandemic, the league formally ceased operations in 2022.

== Teams ==
- Grunthal Redwings (2004-20)
- Ile des Chênes North Stars (2020-22)
- La Broquerie Habs (2005-19)
- Lac du Bonnet Blues (2005-19)
- Landmark Dutchmen (2003-06)
- Mitchell Mohawks (2003-13)
- Niverville Clippers (2010-13)
- Red River Wild (2010-22)
- Springfield 98s (2012-17)
- Steinbach Huskies (2004-19)
- St. Adolphe Hawks (2004-09)
- St Malo Warriors (2005-16)
- Ste. Anne Aces (2003-22)

== Champions ==
Each season, the winner of the playoffs is crowned league champion. The CHSL champion compete against Manitoba's other senior league champions for the Manitoba Senior 'A' Provincial Championship.

| Season | CSHL Champion | Runner-up | Result | Manitoba Senior Provincial result |
|---|---|---|---|---|
| 2003-04 | Mitchell Mohawks | Landmark | | |
| 2004-05 | Mitchell Mohawks | | | |
| 2005-06 | La Broquerie Habs | Ste. Anne Aces | | |
| 2006-07 | La Broquerie Habs | Ste. Anne Aces | | Champion |
| 2007-08 | Ste. Anne Aces | St. Malo Warriors | | |
| 2008-09 | St. Malo Warriors | Ste. Anne Aces | | |
| 2009-10 | Steinbach Huskies | La Broquerie Habs | 4-3 | Champion |
| 2010-11 | Steinbach Huskies | Niverville Clippers | 4-0 | |
| 2011-12 | Niverville Clippers | La Broquerie Habs | 4-0 | |
| 2012-13 | Red River Wild | La Broquerie Habs | 4-3 | 0-2 |
| 2013-14 | Red River Wild | Steinbach Huskies | 4-2 | 1-1; semifinalist |
| 2014-15 | Steinbach Huskies | Grunthal Red Wings | 4-0 | |
| 2015-16 | Ste. Anne Aces | Steinbach Huskies | 4-2 | 1-2 |
| 2016-17 | Ste. Anne Aces | Red River Wild | 4-3 | |
| 2017-18 | Ste. Anne Aces | Grunthal Red Wings | 4-2 | |
| 2018-19 | Ste. Anne Aces | Grunthal Red Wings | 4-2 | |
| 2019-20 | no champion (Note: Grunthal and Ste. Anne tied 2-2 when remainder of the championship series was cancelled by Hockey Manitoba due to COVID-19 outbreak) | | | |
| 2020-21 | no champion (Note: Season cancelled due to COVID-19 pandemic) | | | |
| 2021-22 | no champion | | | |

== See also ==
- Hanover-Taché Hockey League
- Hanover Tache Junior Hockey League
