= 2015 Esso Cup =

Tournament details
- Venue: Red Deer Arena in Red Deer, AB
- Dates: April 19–25, 2015
- Teams: 6

Final positions
- Champions: Sudbury Lady Wolves
- Runners-up: Red Deer Chiefs
- Third place: Saskatoon Stars

Tournament statistics
- Scoring leader: Sophie Shirley

Awards
- MVP: Sophie Shirley

2015 Esso Cup was Canada's seventh national women's midget hockey championship, played April 19–25, 2015 at Red Deer, Alberta. The Sudbury Lady Wolves defeated the host Red Deer Chiefs 2-1 in the final to win the gold medal. The Saskatoon Stars won the bronze medal.

== Teams ==
Result	Team	Region	City
1st place, gold medalist(s)	Sudbury Lady Wolves	Ontario	Sudbury, ON
2nd place, silver medalist(s)	Red Deer Chiefs	Host	Red Deer, AB
3rd place, bronze medalist(s)	Saskatoon Stars	Western (SK)	Saskatoon, SK
4	Central Plains Capitals	Western (MB)	Portage la Prairie, MB
5	Edmonton Thunder	Pacific	Edmonton, AB
6	Moncton Rockets	Atlantic	Moncton, NB

== Round robin ==
Pos	Team	Pld	W	OTW	OTL	L	GF	GA	GD	Pts
1	Sudbury Lady Wolves	5	4	0	0	1	22	10	+12	12
2	Saskatoon Stars	5	4	0	0	1	20	11	+9	12
3	Red Deer Chiefs	5	2	1	0	2	13	13	0	8
4	Central Plains Capitals	5	2	0	2	1	14	9	+5	8
5	Edmonton Thunder	5	1	1	0	3	9	10	−1	5
6	Moncton Rockets	5	0	0	0	5	5	30	−25	0

Schedule and Results
Game	Away team	Score	Home team	Score	Notes
1	Saskatoon	2	Sudbury	3	Final
2	Central Plains	0	Edmonton	1	SO Final
3	Moncton	1	Red Deer	4	Final
4	Saskatoon	3	Central Plains	2	Final
5	Sudbury	9	Moncton	1	Final
6	Red Deer	2	Edmonton	0	Final
7	Moncton	1	Central Plains	6	Final
8	Edmonton	3	Saskatoon	5	Final
9	Sudbury	7	Red Deer	2	Final
10	Edmonton	4	Moncton	1	Final
11	Central Plains	4	Sudbury	1	Final
12	Red Deer	2	Saskatoon	3	Final
13	Edmonton	1	Sudbury	2	Final
14	Moncton	1	Saskatoon	7	Final
15	Central Plains	2	Red Deer	3	SO Final

== Playoffs ==
Game	Away team	Score	Home team	Score	Notes
Semi 1	Central Plains	0	Sudbury	3	Final
Semi 2	Red Deer	2	Saskatoon	1	SO Final
Bronze	Central Plains	1	Saskatoon	5	Final
Gold	Red Deer	1	Sudbury	2	Final

== Individual awards ==
- Most Valuable Player: Sophie Shirley (Saskatoon)
- Top Scorer: Sophie Shirley (Saskatoon)
- Top Forward: Karli Shell (Sudbury)
- Top Defenceman: Tamara McVannel (Central Plains)
- Top Goaltender: Danika Ranger (Sudbury)
- Most Sportsmanlike Player: Nara Elia (Saskatoon)

== Road to the Esso Cup ==
=== Atlantic Region ===
The Moncton Rockets advanced to the Esso Cup by winning tournament held April 2 – 5 at the Red Ball Internet Centre in Moncton, New Brunswick.

Round Robin
Pos	Qualification	Team	Pld	W	L	D	GF	GA	GD	Pts
1	Host	Moncton Rockets	4	4	0	0	19	6	+13	8
2	NSFMAAAHL	Metro	4	3	1	0	7	5	+2	6
3	NBFMAAAHL	Miramichi Northern Stars	4	2	2	0	13	13	0	4
4	PEIMMHL	Mid Isle Wildcats	4	1	3	0	11	18	−7	2
5	HNL	Western Warriors	4	0	4	0	7	15	−8	0

Medal Round
Game	Away team	Score	Home team	Score
Bronze	Mid Isle	6	Miramichi	5
Gold	Metro	1	Moncton	2

=== Quebec ===
Quebec withdrew from Esso Cup competition for the second consecutive year. Hockey Canada awarded this berth to the Western region.

=== Ontario ===
The Sudbury Lady Wolves advanced to the Esso Cup by winning the OWMA championship played April 9 – 12, 2015 at Toronto, Ontario

Playoffs
Game	Away team	Score	Home team	Score
Quarterfinals
QF 1	Sault Ste. Marie	1	Stoney Creek	0
QF 2	Sudbury	1	Whitby	0
QF 3	Aurora	3	Waterloo	1
QF 4	Saugeen-Maitland	2	Oakville	1
Semifinals
SF 1	Saugeen-Maitland	3	Sault Ste. Marie	2
SF 2	Aurora	1	Sudbury	2
Medal Games
Bronze	Aurora	2	Sault Ste. Marie	3
Gold	Sudbury	4	Saugeen-Maitland	1

=== Western Region ===
The Central Plains Capitals and Saskatoon Stars both advanced to the Esso Cup. The Saskatchewan assumed the regular Western region position and Manitoba took Quebec's spot.

Best-of-3 series
Pos	Qualification	Team	Pld	W	L	GF	GA	GD
–	MFMHL	Central Plains Capitals	0	0	0	0	0	0
–	SFMAAAHL	Saskatoon Stars	0	0	0	0	0	0

=== Pacific Region ===
The Edmonton Thunder advanced to the Esso Cup by winning best-of-3 played April 3 – 5 at Edmonton, Alberta.

Best-of-3 series
Pos	Qualification	Team	Pld	W	L	GF	GA	GD
1	AMMFHL	Edmonton Thunder	2	2	0	6	3	+3
2	BCFMAAAHL	Northern Cougars	2	0	2	3	6	−3

== See also ==
- Esso Cup
