= 2018 Esso Cup =

Tournament details
- Venue: Lunenburg County Lifestyle Centre in Bridgewater, NS
- Dates: April 22–28, 2018
- Teams: 6

Final positions
- Champions: St. Albert Slash
- Runners-up: Saskatoon Stars
- Third place: Pionnières de Lanaudière

Tournament statistics
- Scoring leader: Mackenna Parker

Awards
- MVP: Mackenna Parker

The 2018 Esso Cup was Canada's tenth national women's midget hockey championship, contested April 22–28, 2018 at Bridgewater, Nova Scotia. This was the first time the championship has held in Nova Scotia. The St. Alberta Slash of Alberta defeated the Saskatoon Stars 2–1 in the gold medal game to defend their national title.

== Teams ==
Result	Team	Region	City
1st place, gold medalist(s)	St. Albert Slash	Pacific	St. Albert, AB
2nd place, silver medalist(s)	Saskatoon Stars	Western	Saskatoon, SK
3rd place, bronze medalist(s)	Pionnièeres le Lanaudière	Quebec	Repentigny, QC
4	Brampton Canadaettes	Ontario	Brampton, ON
5	Metro	Host	Halifax, NS
6	Northern Selects	Atlantic	Westville Road, NS

== Round robin ==
Pos	Team	Pld	W	OTW	OTL	L	GF	GA	GD	Pts
1	Saskatoon Stars	5	5	0	0	0	23	3	+20	15
2	St. Albert Slash	5	3	1	0	1	22	9	+13	11
3	Brampton Canadaettes	5	1	2	0	2	19	20	−1	7
4	Pionnieeres De Lanaudiere	5	2	0	1	2	11	17	−6	7
5	Northern Selects	5	1	0	1	3	12	19	−7	4
6	Metro	5	0	0	1	4	5	24	−19	1

Schedule and Results
Game	Away team	Score	Home team	Score	Notes
1	Saskatoon	5	Brampton	0	Final
2	Lanaudière	2	St. Albert	3	Final (SO)
3	Northern	3	Metro	1	Final
4	Saskatoon	3	Lanaudière	0	Final
5	Brampton	5	Northern	4	Final (SO)
6	Metro	0	St. Albert	8	Final
7	Northern	2	Lanaudière	4	Final
8	St. Albert	1	Saskatoon	4	Final
9	Brampton	4	Metro	3	Final (SO)
10	St. Albert	4	Northern	1	Final
11	Lanaudière	2	Brampton	8	Final
12	Metro	0	Saskatoon	6	Final
13	St. Albert	6	Brampton	2	Final
14	Northern	2	Saskatoon	5	Final
15	Lanaudière	3	Metro	1	Final

== Playoffs ==
Game	Away team	Score	Home team	Score	Notes
Semi 1	Lanaudiere	1	Saskatoon	5	Final
Semi 2	Brampton	1	St. Albert	2	Final (OT)
Bronze	Lanaudiere	2	Brampton	1	Final
Gold	St. Albert	2	Saskatoon	1	Final

Statistics and game summaries available from HockeyCanada.com

== Individual awards ==
- Most Valuable Player: Mackenna Parker (Saskatoon)
- Top Scorer: Mackenna Parker (Saskatoon)
- Top Forward: McKenzie Hewett (St. Albert)
- Top Defenceman: Ashley Messier (Saskatoon)
- Top Goaltender: Sarah Vanier (Lanaudière)
- Most Sportsmanlike Player: Paige Whaley (Brampton)

== Road to the Esso Cup ==
=== Atlantic Region ===
Northern Selects advance by winning regional championship played March 29–April 1, 2018 at Mount Pearl, Newfoundland and Labrador.

Round Robin
Pos	Qualification	Team	Pld	W	OTW	OTL	L	GF	GA	GD	Pts
1	NSFMAAAHL	Northern Selects	4	4	0	0	0	28	7	+21	12
2	NBFMAAAHL	Northern Lightning	4	1	2	0	1	18	17	+1	7
3	PEIMMHL	Mid Isle Wildcats	4	2	0	1	1	8	5	+3	7
4	HNL	Western Warriors	4	1	0	1	2	13	19	−6	4
5	Host	Eastern Ice Breakers	4	0	0	0	4	5	24	−19	0

Championship Game
Away team	Score	Home team	Score
Northern Lightning	1	Northern Selects	7

=== Quebec ===
Pionnièeres le Lanaudière advance by winning LHFDQ Midget AAA championship played April 13–15, 2018.

Playoffs
Game	Away team	Score	Home team	Score
Semifinals
Semi 1	Chaudière-Appalache	0	Triolet	5
Semi 2	Lanaudière	3	Estrie	1
Medal Games
Final	Triolet	1	Lanaudière	2

=== Ontario ===
Brampton Canadettes advance by winning Ontario Women's Hockey Association championship played April 5–8, 2018 at Toronto, Ontario

Playoffs
Game	Away team	Score	Home team	Score
Semifinals
Semi 1	Brampton Canadaettes	1	Waterloo Ravens	0
Semi 2	Oakville Hornets	5	Toronto Aeros	0
Medal Games
Final	Brampton Canadaettes	2	Oakville Hornets	1

=== Western Region ===
Saskatoon Stars advance by winning regional championship played April 6–7, 2018 at the T.G. Smith Centre in Steinbach, Manitoba.

Best-of-3 series
Pos	Qualification	Team	Pld	W	L	GF	GA	GD
1	SFMAAAHL	Saskatoon Stars	2	2	0	13	2	+11
2	MFMHL	Eastman Selects	2	0	2	2	13	−11

=== Pacific Region ===
St. Albert advanced by winning regional championship played April 6–8, 2018 at Richmond, British Columbia. Best-of-3 series

Best-of-3 series
Pos	Qualification	Team	Pld	W	L	GF	GA	GD
1	AMMFHL	St. Albert Slash	3	2	1	7	6	+1
2	BCFMAAAHL	Greater Vancouver Comets	3	1	2	6	7	−1

== See also ==
- Esso Cup
