= 2016 Esso Cup =

Tournament details
- Venue(s): Crescent Point Place in Weyburn, Saskatchewan
- Dates: April 17–23, 2016
- Teams: 6

Final positions
- Champions: Brantford Ice Cats
- Runners-up: Express du Richelieu
- Third place: Rocky Mountain Raiders

Tournament statistics
- Scoring leader: Nicole Kelly

Awards
- MVP: Nicole Kelly

The 2016 Esso Cup was Canada's eighth national women's midget hockey championship, contested April 17–23, 2016 at Weyburn, Saskatchewan. The Brantford Ice Cats from Ontario captured the national championship with a 10-3 victory over Québec's Express du Richelieu in the gold medal game. The Rocky Mountain Raiders of Alberta won the bronze medal game.

== Teams ==
Result	Team	Region	City
1st place, gold medalist(s)	Brantford Ice Cats	Ontario	Brantford, ON
2nd place, silver medalist(s)	Express du Richelieu	Quebec	Richelieu, Quebec
3rd place, bronze medalist(s)	Rocky Mountain Raiders	Pacific	De Winton, AB
4	Saskatoon Stars	Western	Saskatoon, SK
5	Weyburn Gold Wings	Host	Weyburn, SK
6	Metro Boston Pizza	Atlantic	Halifax, NS

== Round robin ==
Pos	Team	Pld	W	OTW	OTL	L	GF	GA	GD	Pts
1	Rocky Mountain Raiders	5	3	0	1	1	10	7	+3	10
2	Brantford Ice Cats	5	3	0	1	1	16	12	+4	10
3	Saskatoon Stars	5	3	0	0	2	12	10	+2	9
4	Express du Richelieu	5	2	1	0	2	14	14	0	8
5	Weyburn Gold Wings	5	0	2	0	3	11	15	−4	4
6	Metro Boston Pizza	5	1	0	1	3	6	11	−5	4

Schedule and Results
Game	Away team	Score	Home team	Score	Notes
1	Richelieu	1	Metro	0	Final
2	Brantford	1	Rocky Mountain	2	Final
3	Saskatoon	2	Weyburn	0	Final
4	Metro	2	Rocky Mountain	0	Final
5	Richelieu	2	Saskatoon	4	Final
6	Weyburn	2	Brantford	4	Final
7	Rocky Mountain	3	Saskatoon	1	Final
8	Brantford	4	Metro	0	Final
9	Richelieu	5	Weyburn	3	Final
10	Saskatoon	2	Brantford	3	Final
11	Rocky Mountain	3	Richelieu	2	Final
12	Weyburn	3	Metro	2	OT Final
13	Richelieu	5	Brantford	4	SO Final
14	Saskatoon	2	Metro	1	Final
15	Weyburn	3	Rocky Mountain	2	OT Final

== Playoffs ==
Game	Away team	Score	Home team	Score	Notes
Semi 1	Saskatoon	0	Brantford	4	Final
Semi 2	Richelieu	4	Rocky Mountain	3	SO Final
Bronze	Saskatoon	0	Rocky Mountain	3	Final
Gold	Brantford	10	Richelieu	3	Final

== Individual awards ==
- Most Valuable Player: Nicole Kelly (Brantford)
- Top Scorer: Nicole Kelly (Brantford)
- Top Forward: Nicole Kelly (Brantford)
- Top Defenceman: Paige Cohoon (Brantford)
- Top Goaltender: Kate Lloyd (Rocky Mountain)
- Most Sportsmanlike Player: Léonie Philbert (Richelieu)

== Road to the Esso Cup ==
=== Atlantic Region ===
Tournament held March 31–April 3, 2016 at MacLauchlan Arena in Charlottetown, PEI.

Round Robin
Pos	Qualification	Team	Pld	W	OTW	OTL	L	Pts
1	NSFMAAAHL	Metro Boston Pizza	4	3	1	0	0	11
2	NBFMAAAHL	Moncton Rockets	4	2	0	1	1	7
3	PEIMMHL	Kings County Kings	4	0	1	2	1	4
4	HNL	Western	4	0	2	0	2	4
5	Host	Central Storm	4	0	1	2	1	4

Championship Game
Away team	Score	Home team	Score
Moncton Rockets	0	Metro Boston Pizza	4

=== Quebec ===
LHFDQ Midget AAA championship played April 2–3, 2016.

Playoffs
Game	Away team	Score	Home team	Score
Semifinals
Semi 1	Citadelles de al Capitale-Nationale	2	Express du Richelieu	4
Semi 2	Hartangs du Troilet	1	Élles de l'Estrie	2
Medal Games
Final	Élles de l'Estrie	2	Express du Richelieu	5

=== Ontario ===
The OWMA midget championship played April 7–10, 2016 at Toronto, Ontario

Playoffs
Game	Away team	Score	Home team	Score
Semifinals
Semi 1	Stoney Creek Sabres	1	Toronto Aeros	2
Semi 2	Brantford Ice Cats	2	Whitby Wolves	1
Medal Games
Final	Brantford Ice Cats	1	Toronto Aeros	0

=== Western Region ===
Best-of-3 series played April 1 – 2, 2016 at Shoal Lake, Manitoba

Best-of-3 series
Pos	Qualification	Team	Pld	W	L	GF	GA	GD
1	SFMAAAHL	Saskatoon Stars	2	2	0	5	2	+3
2	MFMHL	Yellowhead Chiefs	2	0	2	2	5	−3

=== Pacific Region ===
Best-of-3 series played April 1 – 2, 2016 at Prince George, British Columbia.

Best-of-3 series
Pos	Qualification	Team	Pld	W	L	GF	GA	GD
1	AMMFHL	Rocky Mountain Raiders	2	2	0	6	0	+6
2	BCFMAAAHL	Northern Capitals	2	0	2	0	6	−6

== See also ==
- Esso Cup
