= 2014 Esso Cup =

Tournament details
- Venue: Gateway Ice Centre in Hamilton, ON
- Dates: April 20–26, 2014
- Teams: 6

Final positions
- Champions: Weyburn Gold Wings
- Runners-up: Edmonton Thunder
- Third place: Sudbury Lady Wolves

Tournament statistics
- Scoring leader: Karli Shell

Awards
- MVP: Alexandra Poznikoff

The 2014 Esso Cup was Canada's sixth annual national women's midget hockey championship, which was held April 20–26, 2014 at Hamilton, Ontario. The Weyburn Gold Wings of Saskatchewan defeated the Edmonton Thunder of Alberta to win the gold medal. With the second-place finish, the Thunder continued their streak by taking home a medal for the fifth consecutive year.

== Teams ==
Result	Team	Region	City
1st place, gold medalist(s)	Weyburn Gold Wings	Western	Weyburn, SK
2nd place, silver medalist(s)	Edmonton Thunder	Pacific-AB	Edmonton, AB
3rd place, bronze medalist(s)	Sudbury Lady Wolves	Ontario	Sudbury, ON
4	Stoney Creek Sabres	Host	Stoney Creek, ON
5	Fraser Valley Phantom	Pacific-BC	Langley, BC
6	Moncton Rockets	Atlantic	Moncton, NB

Note: The Pacific region was awarded a second spot in this year's Esso Cup as Quebec did not participate.

== Round robin ==
=== Standings ===
Pos	Team	Pld	W	OTW	OTL	L	GF	GA	GD	Pts
1	Stoney Creek Sabres	5	4	0	1	0	19	8	+11	13
2	Weyburn Gold Wings	5	4	0	0	1	14	10	+4	12
3	Sudbury Lady Wolves	5	3	0	0	2	16	10	+6	9
4	Edmonton Thunder	5	1	1	0	3	13	15	−2	5
5	Fraser Valley Phantom	5	1	0	0	4	12	15	−3	3
6	Moncton Rockets	5	1	0	0	4	11	27	−16	3

=== Scores ===
Sunday, April 20

- Weyburn 2 - Sudbury 1
- Edmonton 1 - Fraser Valley 0
- Stoney Creek 8 - Moncton 1

Monday, April 21

- Weyburn 4 - Edmonton 2
- Sudbury 5 - Moncton 1
- Stoney Creek 3 - Fraser Valley 0

Tuesday, April 22

- Moncton 5 - Edmonton 4
- Weyburn 3 - Fraser Valley 2
- Stoney Creek 2 - Sudbury 1

Wednesday, April 23

- Fraser Valley 7 - Moncton 2
- Sudbury 3 - Edmonton 2
- Stoney Creek 3 - Weyburn 2

Thursday, April 24

- Sudbury 6 - Fraser Valley 3
- Weyburn 3 - Moncton 2
- Edmonton 4 - Stoney Creek 3

== Playoffs ==
Semifinals
4	Edmonton	2
1	Stoney Creek	1
3	Sudbury	0
2	Weyburn	3

Gold Medal Game
4	Edmonton	1
2	Weyburn	2
Bronze Medal Game
3	Sudbury	3
1	Stoney Creek	2

== Individual awards ==
- Most Valuable Player: Alex Poznikoff (Edmonton)
- Top Scorer: Karli Shell (Sudbury)
- Top Forward: Karli Shell (Sudbury)
- Top Defenceman: Jessica Healey (Edmonton)
- Top Goaltender: Jane Kish (Weyburn)
- Most Sportsmanlike Player: Claire Merrick (Stoney Creek)

== Road to the Esso Cup ==
=== Atlantic Region ===
Tournament held April 3 – 6 at Deer Lake, Newfoundland and Labrador.

Round Robin
Pos	Qualification	Team	Pld	W	L	D	GF	GA	GD	Pts
1	NBMAAAFHL	Moncton Rockets	4	3	0	1	14	3	+11	7
2	NSFMAAAHL	East Hants Penguins	4	2	1	1	12	4	+8	5
3	PEIFMAAAHL	King's County Kings	4	2	2	0	9	9	0	4
4	HNL	NL Central	4	1	2	1	5	6	−1	3
5	Host	NL Western	4	0	3	1	3	21	−18	1

Bronze Medal Game

Kings County 3 - NL Central 1 (OT)

Gold Medal Game

Moncton 2 - East Hants 1
Moncton advanced to Esso Cup

=== Quebec ===
Quebec elected to withdraw from this year's competition. Hockey Canada awarded this berth to the Pacific Region.

=== Ontario ===
Ontario Women's Hockey Association Championship played April 10 – 13, 2014 at Toronto, Ontario

Quarterfinals
Whitby Wolves	2
Toronto Aeros	1
Scarborough Sharks	0
Sudbury Lady Wolves	2
Oakville Hornets	1
Thunder Bay Queens	2
Clarington Flames	0
Stoney Creek Sabres	5

Semifinals
Whitby Wolves	0
Sudbury Lady Wolves	1
Thunder Bay Queens	1
Stoney Creek Sabres	2

Final
Sudbury Lady Wolves	3
Stoney Creek Sabres	0

Sudbury advanced to Esso Cup

=== Western Region ===
Best-of-3 played April 4–6 at Weyburn, Saskatchewan.

Best-of-3 series
Pos	Qualification	Team	Pld	W	L	GF	GA	GD
1	SFMAAAHL	Weyburn Gold Wings	3	2	1	9	4	+5
2	MFMHL	Pembina Vallay Hawks	3	1	2	4	9	−5

Weyburn advanced to Esso Cup

=== Pacific Region ===
Rank	Qualification	Team
1	AMMFHL	Edmonton Thunder
2	BCFMAAAHL	Fraser Valley Phantom

The Pacific region was awarded two spots in this year's Esso Cup as the Quebec region did not field a team.
Edmonton and Fraser Valley advanced to Esso Cup

== See also ==
- Esso Cup
