= 2017 Esso Cup =

Tournament details
- Venue: Access Events Centre in Morden, MB
- Dates: April 23–29, 2017
- Teams: 6

Final positions
- Champions: St. Albert Slash
- Runners-up: Harfangs du Triolet
- Third place: Durham West Lightning

Tournament statistics
- Scoring leader: Kate Gallant

Awards
- MVP: Halle Oswald

The 2017 Esso Cup was Canada's ninth national women's midget hockey championship, contested April 23–29, 2017 at Morden, Manitoba. This was the first time that the Esso Cup tournament was played in Manitoba. All games were played at the 1,200-seat Huron Window Corporation Arena, located inside Morden's Access Events Centre. The St. Albert Slash won the gold medal with a 1-0 overtime victory over the Harfangs du Triolet.

== Teams ==
Result	Team	Region	City
1st place, gold medalist(s)	St. Albert Slash	Pacific	St. Albert, AB
2nd place, silver medalist(s)	Harfangs du Triolet	Quebec	Sherbrooke, QC
3rd place, bronze medalist(s)	Durham West Lightning	Ontario	Pickering, ON
4	Pembina Valley Hawks	Host	Morden, MB
5	Prince Albert Bears	Western	Prince Albert, SK
6	Mid Isle Wildcats	Atlantic	Summerside, PE

== Round robin ==
Pos	Team	Pld	W	OTW	OTL	L	GF	GA	GD	Pts
1	St. Albert Slash	5	5	0	0	0	23	7	+16	15
2	Harfangs du Triolet	5	3	0	0	2	14	9	+5	9
3	Pembina Valley Hawks	5	3	0	0	2	13	6	+7	9
4	Durham West Lightning	5	2	0	0	3	18	17	+1	6
5	Prince Albert Bears	5	2	0	0	3	11	14	−3	6
6	Mid Isle Wildcats	5	0	0	0	5	4	30	−26	0

Schedule and Results
Game	Away team	Score	Home team	Score	Notes
1	Durham West	1	Triolet	4	Final
2	Mid Isle	0	St. Albert	6	Final
3	Pembina Valley	2	Prince Albert	1	Final
4	Mid Isle	1	Triolet	4	Final
5	Prince Albert	1	Durham West	5	Final
6	St. Albert	2	Pembina Valley	1	Final
7	Prince Albert	6	Mid Isle	1	Final
8	Triolet	3	St. Albert	4	Final
9	Pembina Valley	4	Durham West	1	Final
10	St. Albert	4	Prince Albert	0	Final
11	Durham West	8	Mid Isle	1	Final
12	Triolet	0	Pembina Valley	1	Final
13	Durham West	3	St. Albert	7	Final
	Triolet	2	Prince Albert	3	Final
15	Mid Isle	1	Pembina Valley	6	Final

== Playoffs ==
Game	Away team	Score	Home team	Score	Notes
Semi 1	Durham West	0	St. Albert	1	Final
Semi 2	Pembina Valley	1	Triolet	2	Final
Bronze	Durham West	4	Pembina Valley	1	Final
Gold	Triolet	0	St. Albert	1	OT Final

== Individual awards ==
- Most Valuable Player: Halle Oswald (Pembina Valley)
- Top Scorer: Kate Gallant (Durham West)
- Top Forward: Chloe Gendreau (Triolet)
- Top Defenceman: Katelyn Heppner (Pembina Valley)
- Top Goaltender: Camryn Drever (St. Albert)
- Most Sportsmanlike Player: Kate Gallant (Durham West)

== Road to the Esso Cup ==
=== Atlantic Region ===
Mid Isle Wildcats advance by winning regional tournament March 30–April 2, 2017.

Round Robin
Pos	Qualification	Team	Pld	W	L	D	GF	GA	GD	Pts
1	NSFMAAAHL	Northern Selects	4	4	0	0	21	11	+10	8
2	PEIMMHL	Mid Isle Wildcats	4	3	1	0	15	9	+6	6
3	HNL	Western Warriors	4	1	3	0	17	22	−5	2
4	NBFMAAAHL	Moncton Rockets	4	1	3	0	11	16	−5	2
5	Host	ProCresting Penguins	4	1	3	0	11	17	−6	2

Championship Game
Away team	Score	Home team	Score
Mid Isle	2	Northern	0

=== Quebec ===
LHFDQ Midget AAA championship was played April 14–16, 2017.

Playoffs
Game	Away team	Score	Home team	Score
Semifinals
Semi 1	Triolet	2	Lac St-Louis	1
Semi 2	Estrie	1	Richelieu	2
Medal Games
Final	Triolet	3	Richelieu	2

=== Ontario ===
The OWMA midget championship was played April 6–9, 2017 at Toronto, Ontario

Playoffs
Game	Away team	Score	Home team	Score
Semifinals
Semi 1	Chatham	0	Toronto	1
Semi 2	Durham West	2	Whitby	0
Medal Games
Final	Durham West	3	Toronto	1

=== Western Region ===
Prince Albert Bears advance by winning series played March 31–April 2, 2017 in Prince Albert, Saskatchewan (series location alternates by province each year).

Best-of-3 series
Pos	Qualification	Team	Pld	W	L	GF	GA	GD
1	SFMAAAHL	Prince Albert Bears	2	2	0	13	10	+3
2	MFMHL	Westman Wildcats*	2	0	2	10	13	−3

=== Pacific Region ===
St. Albert Slash advance by winning series played March 31–April 2, 2017 in St. Albert, Alberta (series location alternates by province each year).

Best-of-3 series
Pos	Qualification	Team	Pld	W	L	GF	GA	GD
1	AMMFHL	St. Albert Slash	2	2	0	5	2	+3
2	BCFMAAAHL	Greater Vancouver Rockets	2	0	2	2	5	−3

== See also ==
- Esso Cup
