= 2022 Esso Cup =

Sports Championship Cup

The 2022 Esso Cup is the women's Midget AAA national championship of Canada. This is the 13th edition of the tournament.

== Awarding of Tournament ==
The event is to be hosted by the Prince Albert Bears. The original winning bid was announced on September 28, 2018 for the 2020 tournament. As part of a May 22, 2020 announcement Prince Albert was announced as the 2021 tournament host. The 2022 host was announced on May 18, 2021.

== Change of Dates and event site ==
On March 22nd Hockey Canada announced the relocation of tournament to a central location in Alberta. The tournament will now be held May 16-22, 2022. The Prince Albert Bears will still qualify as the host team. Hockey Canada also announced they will work with the intended host to have the event hopefully in the not to distant future. The dates of the tournament was also done to give each region sufficient time to complete a tradition regional playdown schedule. The event would be held primarily at the Pason Centennial Arena in Okotoks, Alberta with the Scott Seaman Sports Rink in Foothills County, Alberta being used as a secondary venue due to the 2022 Telus Cup being held in the same venues at the same time.

== Qualifying ==
Qualifying includes 93 teams from all ten provinces.

=== Host ===
- Prince Albert Bears

=== Atlantic Region ===
Qualifier:Northern Selects

==== Participating Leagues ====
- Hockey Newfoundland and Labrador
- Maritime Major Female Hockey League
- Prince Edward Island Female Midget AAA Hockey League

=== Eastern Region (Quebec) ===
Qualifier: Reparts Richelieu

- Hockey Québec

=== Central Region (Ontario) ===
Qualifier: Durham West Jr. Lightning

- Ontario Women's Hockey Association

=== Western Region ===
Qualifier: Notre Dame Hounds Female AAA

==== Participating Leagues ====
- Manitoba Female Midget Hockey League
- Saskatchewan Female U18 AAA Hockey League

=== Pacific Region ===
Qualifier: Fraser Valley Rush

==== Participating Leagues ====
- Alberta Female Hockey League U18 AAA
- BC Elite Hockey League-Female U18 AAA

== Schedule/Results ==
May 16th

- Durham West Jr. Lightning 6-2 Prince Albert Bears
- Notre Dame Hounds Female AAA 2-1 Northern Selects (ot)
- Reparts Richelieu 1-4 Fraser Valley Rush

May 17th

- Durham West Jr. Lightning 3-1 Northern Selects
- Prince Albert Bears 9-1 Reparts Richelieu
- Fraser Valley Rush 2-0 Notre Dame Hounds Female AAA

May 18th

- Northern Selects 6-2 Reparts Richelieu
- Fraser Valley Rush 5-6 Prince Albert Bears
- Notre Dame Hounds Female AAA 3-4 Durham West Jr. Lightning

May 19th

- Northern Selects 4-5 Fraser Valley Rush (so)
- Reparts Richelieu 3-9 Durham West Jr. Lightning
- Prince Albert Bears 2-4 Notre Dame Hounds Female AAA

May 20th

- Fraser Valley Rush 2-5 Durham West Jr. Lightning
- Notre Dame Hounds Female AAA 4-2 Reparts Richelieu
- Prince Albert Bears 0-2 Northern Selects

== Standings ==
Standings
Rank	Team	W-OW-OL-L	GF	GA	Pts
1	(Ontario) Durham West Jr. Lightning	5-0-0-0	27	11	15
2	(British Columbia) Fraser Valley Rush	2-1-0-2	18	16	8
3	(Saskatchewan) Notre Dame Hounds Female AAA	2-1-0-2	13	11	8
4	(Nova Scotia) Northern Selects	2-0-2-1	14	12	8
5	(Saskatchewan) Prince Albert Bears	2-0-0-3	19	21	6
6	(Quebec) Reparts Richelieu	0-0-0-5	12	32	0

== Semifinals ==
May 21st

- Durham West Jr. Lightning 4-0 Northern Selects
- Fraser Valley Rush 3-1 Notre Dame Hounds Female AAA

== Championship Game ==
May 22nd

- Durham West Jr. Lightning 3-0 Fraser Valley Rush

Unlike previous years there was no bronze medal game.

== Links ==
- Tournament website
