= National Women's Under-18 Championship =

- Formerly: Women's Under-18 Hockey Challenge
- Sport: Ice hockey
- First season: 2001
- Most recent champion: Ontario Red (2024)
- Most titles: Ontario Red (14)
- Broadcaster: TSN
- Sponsor: Hockey Canada
- Website: HockeyCanada.ca

The National Women's Under-18 Championship is a Canadian women's ice hockey tournament held by Hockey Canada for provincial and regional teams with individual players being selected by its member branches. It is one of two national championships for female minor hockey in Canada, the other being the Esso Cup, which is a competition for club teams.

== History ==
During its early years, the tournament was known as the Women's Under-18 Hockey Challenge and was not an annual event. The inaugural tournament was held in February 2001 in Trois-Rivières, Quebec. It was a six team tournament that featured regional teams: West (Manitoba/Saskatchewan), Quebec, Atlantic, Pacific (British Columbia/Alberta), and Ontario split into red and blue teams. The second Under-18 Challenge took place in January 2005 at Salmon Arm, British Columbia. This time the four western provinces entered separate teams, but the Atlantic provinces remained together.

In 2005, Hockey Canada restructured the Under-18 Challenge, moving to November and renaming it the National Women's Under-18 Championship. The first was held in November 2005, the same calendar year as the previous tournament. Both 2005 championships were won by the Ontario Red team.

The tournament is now held each year in November, but is skipped every fourth season when the women's hockey competition at the Canada Winter Games takes its place. Ontario teams have won every gold medal at this event. Notable alumni of this tournament are Canadian national team veterans Marie-Philip Poulin, Natalie Spooner, and Sarah Fillier.

== Results ==
Year	Gold Medal	Silver Medal	Bronze Medal	Location
2001	Ontario Red	Quebec	West	Trois-Rivières, QC
2005	Ontario Red	Quebec	British Columbia	Salmon Arm, BC
2005	Ontario Red	Quebec	Atlantic	Salmon Arm, BC
2007	Ontario Red	Quebec	Manitoba	Trois-Rivières, QC
2008	Ontario Red	Quebec	Manitoba	Greater Napanee, ON
2009	Ontario Red	Ontario Blue	Quebec	Surrey, BC
2011	Ontario Red	Quebec	Manitoba	Saguenay, QC
2012	Ontario Blue	Manitoba	Ontario Red	Dawson Creek, BC
2013	Ontario Red	Ontario Blue	Alberta	Calgary, AB
2015	Ontario Red	Manitoba	Ontario Blue	Huntsville, ON
2016	Ontario Red	Quebec	British Columbia	Regina, SK
2017	Ontario Red	Ontario Blue	British Columbia	Quebec City, QC
2019	Ontario Red	Saskatchewan	Quebec	Winkler/Morden, MB
2020	Cancelled	Cancelled	Cancelled	Dawson Creek, BC
2021	Cancelled	Cancelled	Cancelled	Dawson Creek, BC
2023	Ontario Red	Quebec	British Columbia	Dawson Creek, BC
2024	Ontario Red	Quebec	British Columbia	Quispamsis, NB

Notes
1. The 2004-05 and 2005-06 tournaments were held in the same calendar year as a result of Hockey Canada rescheduling the event from February to November.

== Most valuable player ==
Year	Name	Team
2005	Laura Fridfinnson	Manitoba
2007	Audrey Cournoyer	Quebec
2008	Marie-Philip Poulin	Quebec
2009	Meghan Dufault	Manitoba
2011	Jaimie McDonell	Ontario Red
2012	Halli Krzyzaniak	Manitoba
2013	Rebecca Leslie	Ontario Red
2015	Amy Potomak	British Columbia
2016	Amy Potomak	British Columbia
2017	Sarah Fillier	Ontario Red
2019	Ashley Messier	Saskatchewan
2023	Sara Manness	Manitoba
2024	Maxine Cimoroni	Ontario Red

== See also ==
- Esso Cup
