= Alexander Lawrence =

Alexander Lawrence may refer to:

- Alexander Atkinson Lawrence Jr. (1906–1979), US federal judge
- Alexander Lawrence (politician) (died 1899), Scottish-born politician in Manitoba, Canada
- Sir Alexander Waldemar Lawrence, 4th Baronet (1874–1939), British solicitor and politician
- Alexander M. Lawrence, sailing schooner in the New York pilot boat service
