= 2012 Esso Cup =

Tournament details
- Venue: MacLauchlan Arena in Charlottetown, PE
- Dates: April 22–28, 2012
- Teams: 6

Final positions
- Champions: Pembina Valley Hawks
- Runners-up: Thunder Bay Queens
- Third place: Edmonton Thunder

Tournament statistics
- Scoring leader: Michela Cava

Awards
- MVP: Michela Cava

The 2012 Esso Cup was Canada's fourth annual national women's midget hockey championship, which was played April 22–28, 2012 at MacLauchlan Arena inside the CARI Complex on the University of Prince Edward Island campus in Charlottetown, Prince Edward Island. The Pembina Valley Hawks from Manitoba won the gold medal with a 4–2 victory over the Thunder Bay Queens in the championship game. The Edmonton Thunder captured a medal for the third consecutive year by winning the bronze.

== Teams ==
Result	Team	Region	City
1st place, gold medalist(s)	Pembina Valley Hawks	West	Morden, MB
2nd place, silver medalist(s)	Thunder Bay Queens	Ontario	Thunder Bay, ON
3rd place, bronze medalist(s)	Edmonton Thunder	Pacific	Edmonton, AB
4	Metro Boston Pizza	Atlantic	Halifax Regional Municipality, NS
5	Capital District Cyclones	Host	Charlottetown, PE
6	Rebelles de Saguenay-Lac-St-Jean	Quebec	Saguenay, QC

== Round robin ==
=== Standings ===
Pos	Team	Pld	W	OTW	OTL	L	GF	GA	GD	Pts
1	Thunder Bay Queens	5	5	0	0	0	36	9	+27	15
2	Pembina Valley Hawks	5	3	1	0	1	15	8	+7	11
3	Edmonton Thunder	5	2	0	2	1	10	9	+1	8
4	Metro Boston Pizza	5	2	0	0	3	13	14	−1	6
5	Capital District Cyclones	5	1	0	0	4	8	27	−19	3
6	Rebelles de Saguenay-Lac-St-Jean	5	0	1	0	4	6	21	−15	2

=== Scores ===
- Metro 5 - Saguenay-Lac-St-Jean 1
- Pembina Valley 1 - Edmonton 0 (SO)
- Thunder Bay 12 - Capital District 1
- Pembina Valley 4 - Saguenay-Lac-St-Jean 0
- Thunder Bay 6 - Edmonton 1
- Metro 5 - Capital District 2
- Thunder Bay 8 - Saguenay-Lac-St-Jean 1
- Pembina Valley 2 - Metro 1
- Edmonton 4 - Capital District 0
- Thunder Bay 5 - Metro 2
- Saguenay-Lac-St-Jean 2 - Edmonton 1 (SO)
- Pembina Valley 4 - Capital District 2
- Edmonton 4 - Metro 0
- Thunder Bay 5 - Pembina Valley 4
- Capital District 3 - Saguenay-Lac-St-Jean 2

== Playoffs ==
Semifinals
4	Metro	2
1	Thunder Bay	4
3	Edmonton	1
2	Pembina Valley	2

Gold Medal Game
2	Pembina Valley	4
1	Thunder Bay	2
Bronze Medal Game
4	Metro	1
3	Edmonton	4

== Individual awards ==
- Most Valuable Player: Michela Cava (Thunder Bay)
- Top Scorer: Michela Cava (Thunder Bay)
- Top Forward: Jessica Gazzola (Thunder Bay)
- Top Defenceman: Madison Hutchinson (Pembina Valley)
- Top Goaltender: Brittni Mowat (Pembina Valley)
- Most Sportsmanlike Player: Breanna Lanceleve (Metro)

== Road to the Esso Cup ==
=== Atlantic Region ===
Regional tournament held March 29–31 in Bathurst, New Brunswick

Round Robin
Pos	Team	Pld	W	L	D	GF	GA	GD	Pts
1	Metro Boston Pizza	4	4	0	0	16	4	+12	8
2	Moncton Rockets	4	3	1	0	19	5	+14	6
3	Northern Stars	4	2	2	0	12	7	+5	4
4	Capital District Cyclones	4	1	3	0	11	14	−3	2
5	Tri-Pen Ice	4	0	4	0	3	31	−28	0

Championship Game
Moncton	2
Metro	3

Metro advances to Esso Cup

=== Quebec ===
Dodge Cup Midget Championship held April 12–15, 2012 at Laval, Quebec

Quarterfinals
Richelieu	0
Saguenay-Lac-St-Jean	5
Outaouais	2
Bas St-Laurent	4
Laurentides-Lanaudière	1
Estrie	6
Lac St-Louis	1
QC-Chaud-Appalaches	2

Semifinals
Saguenay-Lac-St-Jean	3
Bas St-Laurent	0
Estrie	3
QC-Chaud-Appalaches	1

Final
Saguenay-Lac-St-Jean	2
Estrie	1

Saguenay-Lac-St-Jean wins Dodge Cup and advances to Esso Cup

=== Ontario ===
Ontario Women's Hockey Association Championship held April 13–15, 2012 at Vaughan, Ontario

Quarterfinals
Mississauga	0
Toronto Leaside	3
Waterloo	3
Stoney Creek	1
Kanata	2
North Bay	0
Oakville	0
Thunder Bay	3

Semifinals
Toronto Leaside	2
Waterloo	3
Kanata	1
Thunder Bay	2

Final
Waterloo	0
Thunder Bay	5

Thunder Bay advances to Esso Cup

=== Western Region ===
Best-of-3 series played April 6–8, 2012 at Wilcox, Saskatchewan

Best-of-3 series
Pos	Team	Pld	W	L	GF	GA	GD
1	Pembina Valley Hawks	2	2	0	5	3	+2
2	Notre Dame Hounds	2	0	2	3	5	−2

Pembina Valley advances to Esso Cup

=== Pacific Region ===
Best-of-3 series played April 6–8, 2012 at Surrey, British Columbia

Best-of-3 series
Pos	Team	Pld	W	L	GF	GA	GD
1	Edmonton Thunder	2	2	0	6	3	+3
2	Fraser Valley Phantom	2	0	2	3	6	−3

Edmonton advances to Esso Cup

== See also ==
- Esso Cup
