= Ashley Messier =

Canadian ice hockey player

- Born: March 27, 2002 (age 24) Wilcox, Saskatchewan, Canada
- Height: 160 cm (5 ft 3 in)
- Position: Defence
- Shoots: Right
- PWHL team: Vancouver Goldeneyes
- National team: Canada
- NHL draft: 61, 2026; Vancouver Goldeneyes
- Playing career: 2020–present

Ashley Anne Messier is a Canadian ice hockey defender, currently playing for the University of Minnesota Duluth in the NCAA.

== Career ==
From 2016 to 2019, she played for the Saskatoon Stars in the Saskatchewan Female Midget AAA Hockey League, winning the SFMAAAHL championship twice and being named the league's best defender in 2019. She was named top defender at the 2018 and 2019 Esso Cups. She then spent the 2019-20 season at Bishop Kearney High School in the United States, winning a state U19 title with the school's Selects Hockey Academy.

She has committed to Cornell University for the 2020-21 season, studying in the College of Agriculture and Life Sciences and the SC Johnson College of Business.

Ashley Messier was selected by the Vancouver Goldeneyes in the 6th and final round, 61st overall, in the 2026 PWHL Draft.

== International career ==
She played for Canada at the 2020 IIHF World Women's U18 Championship in Slovakia, notching two points in five games as the country won silver. She had previously taken part in the American U18 Select Player Development Camp and played for the US in the U18 Summer Series against Canada before discovering that she was ineligible to continue with the American national team as she had never played for an American club.

== Personal life ==
Messier is the daughter of former NHL player Joby Messier. She is a dual Canada-US citizen.
