= Morden (electoral district) =

Defunct provincial electoral district in Manitoba, Canada

Morden is a former provincial electoral district of Manitoba, Canada, which was represented in the Legislative Assembly of Manitoba from 1888 to 1914. The district was centred on the town of Morden in the southernmost part of the province.

After 1914, the district was merged into Morden and Rhineland.

== Members of the Legislative Assembly ==
Name	Party	Took office	Left office
Alexander Lawrence	Liberal	1888	1892
Thomas Duncan	Liberal	1892	1899
John Ruddell	Conservative	1899	1906
George Ashdown	Conservative	1906	1907
Benjamin McConnell	Liberal	1907	1914

== See also ==
- List of Manitoba provincial electoral districts
- Canadian provincial electoral districts
