= Decor Cabinets =

Canadian cabinet manufacturing company

Decor Cabinets Ltd
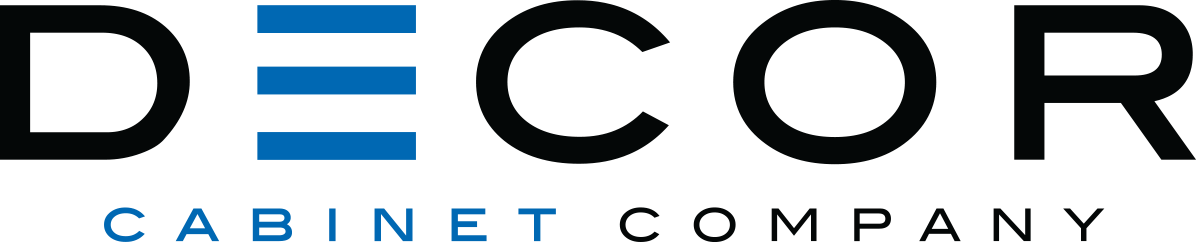
- Decor Cabinet Ltd Logo
- Company type: Private
- Industry: Cabinet manufacturing
- Founded: Portage la Prairie, Canada (1977)
- Headquarters: Morden, Manitoba, Canada
- Area served: Canada and U.S.
- Products: Custom kitchen and bath vanities
- Brands: Talora, Zonavita, Sorrento, Allura, Fina, Burton Allen, DreamRooms and Cynergi
- Revenue: $249 million
- Number of employees: 531
- Website: decorcabinets.com

Decor Cabinets Ltd (also known as the Decor Cabinet Company) is a Manitoba based manufacturer of custom kitchen, bath and specialty cabinetry.

In 2018, The FDMC 300 group ranked Decor as the 120th largest furniture manufacturer in North America. This publication covers trends and news that affect small cabinet shops to large woodworking plants in North America.

Decor Cabinets currently employs more than 500 people between its head office, production plant and showroom.

== History ==
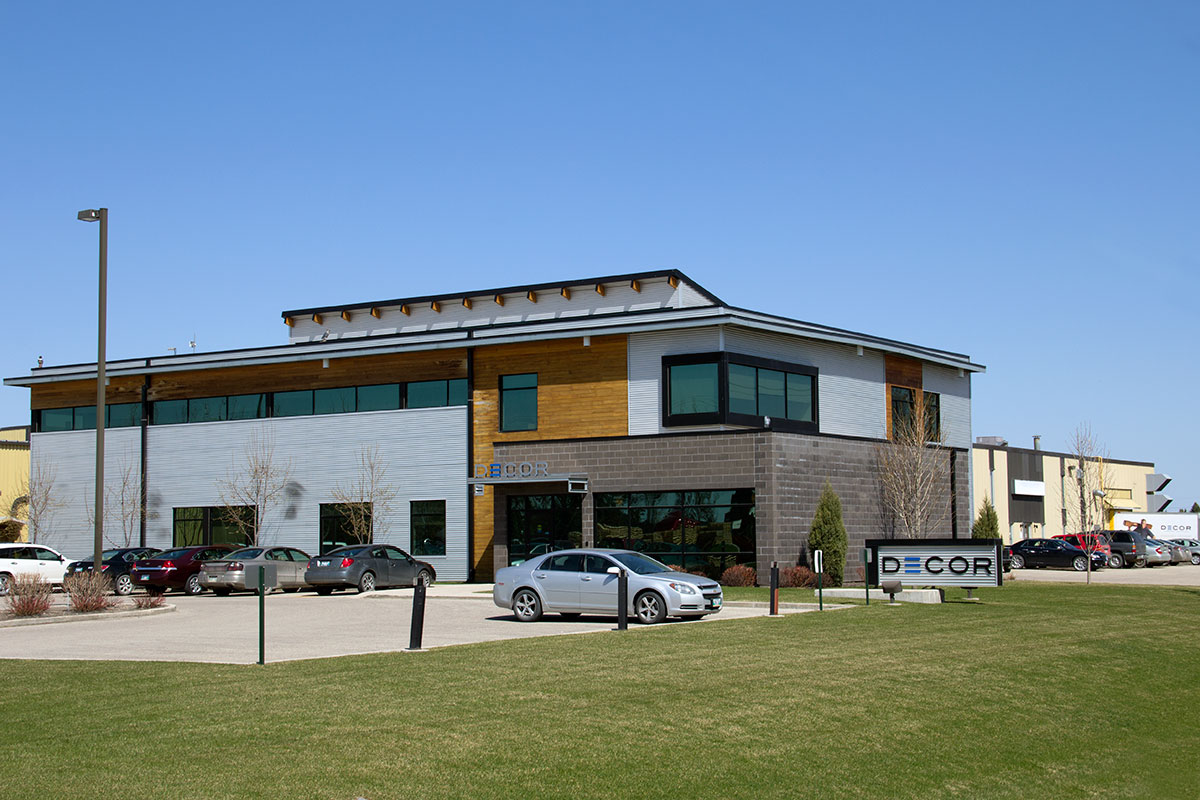
Decor Cabinets Ltd headquarters in Morden, Manitoba, Canada

Decor Cabinets Ltd., founded by Larry and Sylvia Dick n 1977, began producing framed cabinets in a two-car garage near Winnipeg, Manitoba, then moved to Portage la Prairie, Manitoba, a few months later.

The company produced framed and frameless products for several years and then moved exclusively into frameless production. In 1985 the company shifted its focus to custom frameless products with full access cabinetry. In 1990 Decor moved to its current location in Morden, Manitoba.

The company was able to gain market share despite fierce competition and the housing market crash in the U.S. that started in 2008.

== The company ==
Decor Cabinets is owned by Stan and Connie Pauls. Its dealer network includes four Canadian provinces and 33 U.S. states.
