= John Ruddell =

Canadian politician

John Henry Ruddell
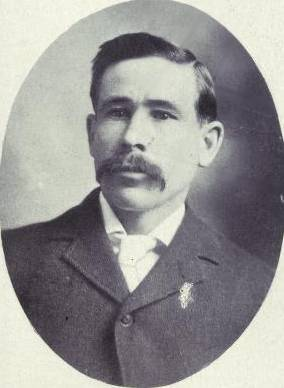

Member of the Legislative Assembly of Manitoba for Morden
- In office 1900–1906
- Succeeded by: George Ashdown

Personal details
- Born: 1859; Halton County, Canada West
- Died: April 17, 1906

John Henry Ruddell (1859 – April 17, 1906) was a harness maker, realtor and political figure in Manitoba. He represented Morden from 1900 to 1906 in the Legislative Assembly of Manitoba as a Conservative.

He was born in Halton County, Canada West, the son of George Ruddell and Christina Stewart, and came to Manitoba in the early 1880s to establish a harness-making business in Nelson. Ruddell later moved to Morden, where he established a real estate firm. He also served as mayor of Morden.

The town of Ruddell, Saskatchewan may have been named after him.
