= 2009 Esso Cup =

Tournament details
- Venue(s): Max Bell Centre in Calgary, AB
- Dates: April 19–25, 2009
- Teams: 5

Final positions
- Champions: Westman Wildcats
- Runners-up: Scarborough Sharks
- Third place: Calgary Flyers

Awards
- MVP: Brittany Styner

The 2009 Esso Cup was Canada's inaugural national women's midget hockey championship, played April 19–25, 2009 at the Max Bell Centre in Calgary, Alberta. The Westman Wildcats from Manitoba defeated the Scarborough Sharks from Ontario to win the first gold medal. The host Calgary Flyers defeated their provincial rival, the Edmonton Thunder, to take the bronze. Calgary's Brittany Styner was named the tournament's most valuable player.

== Teams ==
Result	Team	Region	City
1st place, gold medalist(s)	Westman Wildcats	Western	Souris, MB
2nd place, silver medalist(s)	Scarborough Sharks	Ontario	Toronto (Scarborough), ON
3rd place, bronze medalist(s)	Calgary Flyers	Host	Calgary, AB
4	Edmonton Thunder	Pacific	Edmonton, AB
5	Northern Stars	Atlantic	Bathurst, NB

Note: Quebec did not participate in the first Esso Cup

== Round robin ==
=== Standings ===
Pos	Team	Pld	W	OTW	OTL	L	GF	GA	GD	Pts
1	Calgary Flyers	4	4	0	0	0	22	6	+16	8
2	Westman Wildcats	4	3	0	0	1	13	10	+3	6
3	Edmonton Thunder	4	2	0	0	2	13	8	+5	4
4	Scarborough Sharks	4	1	0	0	3	8	14	−6	2
5	Northern Stars	4	0	0	0	4	3	21	−18	0

=== Scores ===
- Westman 3 - Edmonton 1
- Calgary 6 - Scarborough 0
- Edmonton 5 - Scarborough 1
- Calgary 6 - Northern 1
- Westman 6 - Northern 0
- Calgary 4 - Edmonton 2
- Scarborough 4 - Northern 2
- Calgary 6 - Westman 3
- Edmonton 5 - Northern 0
- Scarborough 3 - Westman 1

== Playoffs ==
=== Semi-finals ===
- Westman 3 - Edmonton 2
- Scarborough 4 - Calgary 2

=== Bronze-medal game ===
- Calgary 3 - Edmonton 2

=== Gold-medal game ===
- Westman 5 - Scarborough 2

== Individual awards ==
- Most Valuable Player: Brittany Styner (Calgary)
- Top Forward: Brittany Esposito (Edmonton)
- Top Defence: Brigette Lacquette (Westman)
- Top Goaltender: Emily Blakely (Northern)
- Most Sportsmanlike Player: Erin Lally (Calgary)

== Road to the Esso Cup ==
=== Atlantic Region ===
Regional Tournament held March 26–29, 2009

==== Round robin ====
Pos	Team	Pld	W	L	D	GF	GA	GD	Pts
1	Northern Stars	4	4	0	0	29	10	+19	8
2	Metro Boston Pizza	4	3	1	0	16	15	+1	6
3	Western	4	2	2	0	17	17	0	4
4	Capital District Cyclones	4	1	3	0	13	17	−4	2
5	Cape Breton Screaming Eagles (H)	4	0	4	0	9	25	−16	0

(H) Hosts

===== Championship Game =====
- Northern 3 - Metro 1

Northern advances to Esso Cup

=== Quebec ===
Quebec did not field a team in this year's Esso Cup

=== Ontario ===
Ontario Women's Hockey Association Championship held March 27–28, 2009

==== Semi-finals ====
- Scarborough 2 – Sudbury 1
- Whitby 2- Saugeen-Maitland 1

===== Championship Game =====
- Scarborough 2 - Whitby 1

Scarborough advances to Esso Cup

=== Western Region ===
Best-of-3 series played April 3–5, 2009

Prince Albert Bears vs Westman Wildcats

- Game 1: Westman 5 - Prince Albert 2
- Game 2: Westman 2 - Prince Albert 1

Westman wins series and advances to Esso Cup

=== Pacific Region ===
Best-of-3 series played April 3–5, 2009

Vancouver Fusion vs Edmonton Thunder

- Game 1: Edmonton 2 - Vancouver 0
- Game 2: Edmonton 2 - Vancouver 0

Edmonton wins series and advances to Esso Cup

== See also ==
- Esso Cup
