= Whitecap Resources Centre =

Indoor arena in Saskatchewan, Canada

Coordinates: 49.6659°N 103.8605°W

- The Colosseum
- Interactive map of Whitecap Resources Centre
- Former names: Weyburn Colosseum (1960-2008); Crescent Point Place (2008-2025)
- Location: 327 Mergens St. Weyburn, SK
- Owner: City of Weyburn
- Operator: City of Weyburn
- Capacity: 1,495

Construction
- Opened: 1960

Tenant
- Weyburn Red Wings (SJHL) (1961–present)

Whitecap Resources Centre (formerly Crescent Point Place) is an indoor multi-use arena in Weyburn, Saskatchewan. Located in the city's agricultural grounds, it is the home arena of the Weyburn Red Wings of the Saskatchewan Junior Hockey League (SJHL), and is host of the Saskatchewan Oil and Gas Show.

== History ==
The venue originally opened as the Weyburn Colosseum. In 2008, naming rights were acquired by Crescent Point Energy (now Veren, Inc.), renaming it Crescent Point Place. The naming rights helped to fund a series of renovations, such as updated dressing rooms, additional seating, and new luxury boxes. In 2010, the arena and adjacent Tom Zandee Sports Arena underwent additional renovations, including an updated lobby.

In November 2024, the arena was temporarily closed after an ammonia leak in the new ice plant that had been installed the previous year.

In August 2025, it was announced that the arena would be renamed Whitecap Resources Centre as part of the acquisition of Veren by Whitecap Resources. The naming rights will last for at least one year.

== Notable events ==
The arena has hosted concerts featuring performers such as Dean Brody and Volbeat.

The arena hosted the 2016 Esso Cup, the Canadian women's midget hockey championship.

The arena hosts the biennial Saskatchewan Oil and Gas Show; the arena floor and adjacent Tom Zandee Sports Arena are used as indoor convention space, while outdoor exhibits are housed on the agricultural grounds.
