= Morden-Winkler =

Provincial electoral district in Manitoba, Canada

Coordinates: 49.18767°N 98.02631°W

Manitoba electoral district

Provincial electoral district
- Legislature: Legislative Assembly of Manitoba
MLA
Carrie Hiebert
Progressive Conservative
- District created: 2008
- First contested: 2011
- Last contested: 2023

Demographics
- Population (2016): 22,000
- Electors (2019): 14,813
- Area (km²): 75
- Pop. density (per km²): 293.3

Morden-Winkler is a provincial electoral district of Manitoba, Canada. It was created by redistribution in 2008 and was created out of part of Pembina.

The riding includes the cities of Winkler and Morden. The riding's population in 2006 was 19,505. As of 2018, the riding's population is estimated to be around 25,000.

== Members of the Legislative Assembly ==
| Assembly | Years | Member | Party |
|---|---|---|---|
Riding created from Pembina
| 40th | 2011-2016 | Cameron Friesen | Progressive Conservative |
| 41st | 2016–2019 | Cameron Friesen | Progressive Conservative |
| 42nd | 2019–2023 | Cameron Friesen | Progressive Conservative |
| 43rd | 2023–present | Carrie Hiebert | Progressive Conservative |

== Election results ==
=== 2023 ===
2023 Manitoba general election
| Party | Candidate | Votes | % | ±% | Expenditures |
|---|---|---|---|---|---|
| Progressive Conservative | Carrie Hiebert | 5,135 | 73.47 | -7.39 | $13,788.39 |
| New Democratic | Ken Friesen | 1,600 | 22.89 | +18.06 | $1,413.79 |
| Liberal | Mattison Froese | 254 | 3.63 | -0.03 | $0.00 |
| Total valid votes/expense limit | | 6,989 | 99.33 | – | $61,890.00 |
| Total rejected and declined ballots | | 47 | 0.67 | – | |
| Turnout | | 7,036 | 44.32 | -6.87 | |
| Eligible voters | | 15,875 | | | |
| Progressive Conservative hold | | Swing | | -12.72 | |
Source(s) Source: Elections Manitoba

=== 2019 ===
2019 Manitoba general election
| Party | Candidate | Votes | % | ±% | Expenditures |
|---|---|---|---|---|---|
| Progressive Conservative | Cameron Friesen | 6,109 | 80.86 | -2.2 | $12,339.21 |
| Green | Mike Urichuk | 804 | 10.64 | +0.8 | $129.20 |
| New Democratic | Robin Dalloo | 365 | 4.83 | +1.7 | $0.00 |
| Liberal | David Mintz | 277 | 3.67 | -0.3 | $0.00 |
| Total valid votes | | 7,555 | 99.63 | – | |
| Rejected | | 28 | 0.37 | | |
| Turnout | | 7,583 | 51.19 | | |
| Eligible voters | | 14,813 | | | |
| Progressive Conservative hold | | Swing | | -1.5 | |
Source(s) Source: Manitoba. Chief Electoral Officer (2019). Statement of Votes for the 42nd Provincial General Election, September 10, 2019 (PDF) (Report). Winnipeg: Elections Manitoba. "Candidate Election Returns". Elections Manitoba. Elections Manitoba.

=== 2016 ===
2016 provincial election redistributed results
| Party | % |
|---|---|
| Progressive Conservative | 83.1 |
| Green | 9.8 |
| Liberal | 4.0 |
| New Democratic | 3.1 |

2016 Manitoba general election
| Party | Candidate | Votes | % | ±% | Expenditures |
|---|---|---|---|---|---|
| Progressive Conservative | Cameron Friesen | 6,598 | 85.04 | -0.49 | $14,748.12 |
| Green | Mike Urichuk | 667 | 8.60 | – | $979.50 |
| Liberal | Benjamin Bawdon | 279 | 3.60 | 0.59 | $41.45 |
| New Democratic | Elizabeth Lynch | 215 | 2.77 | -8.69 | $793.14 |
| Total valid votes | | 7,759 | – | – | |
| Rejected | | 34 | – | | |
| Eligible voters / turnout | | 15,006 | 51.93 | 11.15 | |
Source(s) Source: Manitoba. Chief Electoral Officer (2016). Statement of Votes for the 41st Provincial General Election, April 19, 2016 (PDF) (Report). Winnipeg: Elections Manitoba. "Election Returns: 41st General Election". Elections Manitoba. 2016.

=== 2011 ===
2011 Manitoba general election
| Party | Candidate | Votes | % | Expenditures |
|---|---|---|---|---|
| Progressive Conservative | Cameron Friesen | 4,918 | 85.53 | $20,100.34 |
| New Democratic | Aaron McDowell | 659 | 11.46 | $0.00 |
| Liberal | Daniel Woldeyohanis | 173 | 3.01 | $0.00 |
| Total valid votes | | 5,750 | – | |
| Rejected | | 39 | – | |
| Eligible voters / turnout | | 14,195 | 40.78 | |
Source(s) Source: Manitoba. Chief Electoral Officer (2011). Statement of Votes for the 40th Provincial General Election, October 4, 2011 (PDF) (Report). Winnipeg: Elections Manitoba. "Election Returns: 40th General Election". Elections Manitoba. 2011.

== See also ==
- List of Manitoba provincial electoral districts
- Canadian provincial electoral districts
