= Benjamin McConnell =

Canadian politician

Benjamin James McConnell
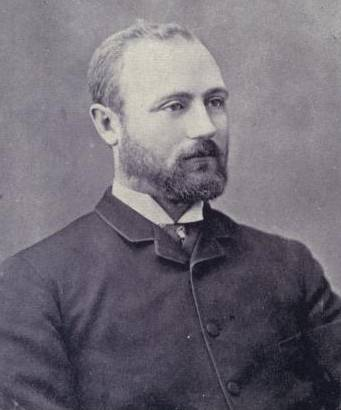

Member of the Legislative Assembly of Manitoba for Morden
- In office 1907–1914

Personal details
- Born: September 28, 1861 Renfrew County, Ontario
- Died: February 15, 1923 (aged 61) Winnipeg, Manitoba

Benjamin James McConnell (September 28, 1861—February 15, 1923) was a politician in Manitoba, Canada. He served in the Legislative Assembly of Manitoba from 1907 to 1914, as a member of the Liberal Party.

McConnell was born in Point Alexander, north Renfrew County, Canada West (now Ontario), the son of Benjamin McConnell and Catherine Melville. He was educated at Pembroke, and studied medicine at Queen's University in Kingston. He moved to Manitoba in 1881 to practice medicine, first settling in Nelson, and then moving to Morden in 1885. McConnell married Catherine Pollock Fraser in 1884. He served as provincial coroner for ten years and was president of the Manitoba College of Physicians and Surgeons and of the Southern Manitoba Medical Association. McConnell retired from the practice of medicine in 1902. He also owned the Morden Woollen Mill and a large farm.

He was first elected to the Manitoba legislature in the 1907 provincial election, defeating Conservative incumbent George Ashdown by 90 votes in the Morden constituency. He was re-elected in the 1910 election. Both elections were won by the Conservatives, and McConnell served as an opposition member for his entire tenure in the legislature. He did not seek re-election in 1914.

McConnell died at home in Winnipeg, aged 61.

His former residence in Morden was designated a municipal heritage building.
