= Cameron Friesen =

Canadian politician

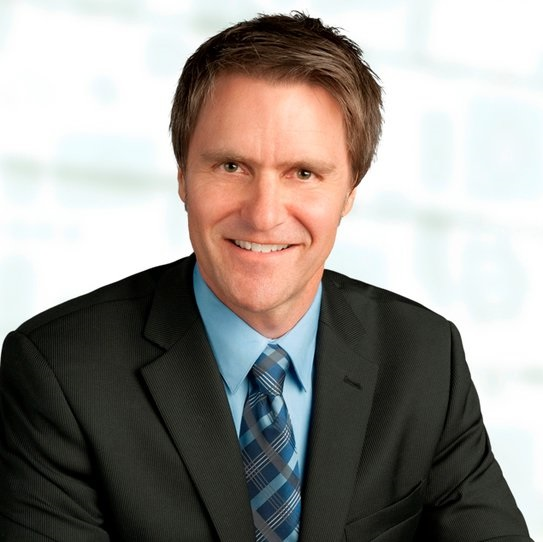

Manitoba Minister of Finance
- In office January 18, 2022 – January 30, 2023
- Premier: Heather Stefanson
- Preceded by: Scott Fielding
- Succeeded by: Cliff Cullen
- In office May 3, 2016 – August 1, 2018
- Premier: Brian Pallister
- Preceded by: Greg Dewar
- Succeeded by: Scott Fielding

Manitoba Minister of Justice and Attorney General
- In office January 5, 2021 – January 18, 2022
- Premier: Brian Pallister; Kelvin Goertzen; Heather Stefanson
- Preceded by: Cliff Cullen
- Succeeded by: Kelvin Goertzen

Minister of Health, Seniors and Active Living
- In office August 1, 2018 – January 5, 2021
- Premier: Brian Pallister
- Preceded by: Kelvin Goertzen
- Succeeded by: Heather Stefanson

Member of the Legislative Assembly of Manitoba for Morden-Winkler
- In office October 4, 2011 – February 3, 2023
- Preceded by: First Member
- Succeeded by: Carrie Hiebert

Personal details
- Born: Morden, Manitoba
- Party: Progressive Conservative
- Education: Canadian Mennonite University; University of Manitoba; University of British Columbia; University of Winnipeg
- Occupation: Teacher

Cameron Scott Friesen is a Canadian politician and was a member of the Legislative Assembly of Manitoba for Morden-Winkler. A member of the Progressive Conservative Party of Manitoba, he was first elected in the 2011 provincial election, and re-elected in 2016 and 2019.

Friesen was the Manitoba Minister of Finance from May 3, 2016 until August 1, 2018 and served a second term from January 18, 2022 until January 30, 2023. He was appointed Minister of Health, Seniors and Active Living on August 1, 2018. During his tenure as Minister of Health, Seniors and Active Living, Friesen has faced several criticisms for his handling of the COVID-19 pandemic. He was appointed Minister of Justice and Attorney General on January 5, 2021.

Friesen announced his resignation as Minister of Finance in January 2023, and shortly thereafter on February 3, 2023 he resigned his seat as MLA for Morden-Winkler to seek the federal nomination in Portage—Lisgar after Candice Bergen announced the previous fall that she would not be seeking reelection in the 45th Canadian federal election. He lost the nomination to Branden Leslie.

== Health minister ==
In November 2020 he questioned the motivation of more than 200 experts who raised concerns regarding the seriousness of COVID-19. At the time, he claimed he had things under control. After he refused to apologize, opposition MLAs including New Democratic Party health critic Uzoma Asagwara and Liberal Party leader Dougald Lamont called on him to resign.

== Electoral record ==
2019 Manitoba general election: Morden-Winkler
Party	Candidate	Votes	%	±%	Expenditures
Progressive Conservative	Cameron Friesen	6,109	80.86	-2.2	$12,339.21
Green	Mike Urichuk	804	10.64	+0.8	$129.20
New Democratic	Robin Dalloo	365	4.83	+1.7	$0.00
Liberal	David Mintz	277	3.67	-0.3	$0.00
Total valid votes		7,555	99.63	–	
Rejected		28	0.37		
Turnout		7,583	51.19		
Eligible voters		14,813			
Progressive Conservative hold		Swing		-1.5	
Source(s) Source: Manitoba. Chief Electoral Officer (2019). Statement of Votes for the 42nd Provincial General Election, September 10, 2019 (PDF) (Report). Winnipeg: Elections Manitoba. "Candidate Election Returns". Elections Manitoba. Elections Manitoba.

2016 Manitoba general election: Morden-Winkler
Party	Candidate	Votes	%	±%	Expenditures
Progressive Conservative	Cameron Friesen	6,598	85.04	-0.49	$14,748.12
Green	Mike Urichuk	667	8.60	–	$979.50
Liberal	Benjamin Bawdon	279	3.60	0.59	$41.45
New Democratic	Elizabeth Lynch	215	2.77	-8.69	$793.14
Total valid votes		7,759	–	–	
Rejected		34	–		
Eligible voters / turnout		15,006	51.93	11.15	
Source(s) Source: Manitoba. Chief Electoral Officer (2016). Statement of Votes for the 41st Provincial General Election, April 19, 2016 (PDF) (Report). Winnipeg: Elections Manitoba. "Election Returns: 41st General Election". Elections Manitoba. 2016.

2011 Manitoba general election: Morden-Winkler
Party	Candidate	Votes	%	Expenditures
Progressive Conservative	Cameron Friesen	4,918	85.53	$20,100.34
New Democratic	Aaron McDowell	659	11.46	$0.00
Liberal	Daniel Woldeyohanis	173	3.01	$0.00
Total valid votes		5,750	–	
Rejected		39	–	
Eligible voters / turnout		14,195	40.78	
Source(s) Source: Manitoba. Chief Electoral Officer (2011). Statement of Votes for the 40th Provincial General Election, October 4, 2011 (PDF) (Report). Winnipeg: Elections Manitoba. "Election Returns: 40th General Election". Elections Manitoba. 2011.
