= George Ashdown =

Canadian politician (1851–1939)

Member of the Legislative Assembly of Manitoba for Morden
- In office 1906–1907
- Preceded by: John Ruddell
- Succeeded by: Benjamin McConnell

Personal details
- Born: April 8, 1851 Etobicoke, Canada West
- Died: May 14, 1939 (aged 88) Winnipeg, Manitoba
- Party: Conservative Party of Manitoba

George Ashdown (April 8, 1851 - May 14, 1939) was a Canadian politician, who represented the electoral district of Morden in the Legislative Assembly of Manitoba from 1906 to 1907.

Born in Etobicoke, Canada West in 1851, he moved to Winnipeg, Manitoba in 1872 to work in the hardware store of his brother, future Winnipeg mayor James Ashdown. In 1891 he moved to Morden to open his own hardware store, which he operated for 20 years. He served two terms as mayor of Morden in the early 1900s.

Following the death in office of Morden's MLA John Ruddell in 1906, Ashdown was selected as the Conservative Party's candidate for the resulting by-election. As the opposition Liberal Party did not nominate a candidate by the close of nominations on May 18, Ashdown was acclaimed to office on that date.

Ashdown ran again in the 1907 election, but was defeated by Benjamin McConnell of the Liberals.

Following his defeat, he retired from the Morden store in 1911, returning to Winnipeg and working in real estate and as manager of his brother's store. He died in Winnipeg on May 14, 1939.
