= 2010 Esso Cup =

Tournament details
- Venue(s): Co-operators Centre at Evraz Place in Regina, SK
- Dates: April 18–24, 2010
- Teams: 6

Final positions
- Champions: Thunder Bay Queens
- Runner-up: Notre Dame Hounds
- Third place: Edmonton Thunder

Tournament statistics
- Scoring leader(s): Brienna Gillanders

Awards
- MVP: Kaitlyn Tougas

The 2010 Esso Cup was Canada's second annual national women's midget hockey championship, played April 18–24, 2010 at the Co-operators Centre at Evraz Place in Regina, Saskatchewan. The Thunder Bay Queens defeated the Notre Dame Hounds 4–3 in the gold medal game to win their first Esso Cup title. Thunder Bay's Kaitlyn Tougas was named the tournament's most valuable player.

== Teams ==
Result	Team	Region	City
1st place, gold medalist(s)	Thunder Bay Queens	Ontario	Thunder Bay, ON
2nd place, silver medalist(s)	Notre Dame Hounds	West	Wilcox, SK
3rd place, bronze medalist(s)	Edmonton Thunder	Pacific	Edmonton, AB
4	Regina Rebels	Host	Regina, SK
5	Moncton Rockets	Atlantic	Moncton, NB
6	Remparts du Richelieu	Quebec	Richelieu, QC

== Round robin ==
=== Standings ===
Pos	Team	Pld	W	OTW	OTL	L	GF	GA	GD	Pts
1	Thunder Bay Queens	5	4	0	0	1	19	8	+11	12
2	Notre Dame Hounds	5	3	1	0	1	20	15	+5	11
3	Regina Rebels	5	2	1	0	2	12	10	+2	8
4	Edmonton Thunder	5	1	1	1	2	11	15	−4	6
5	Moncton Rockets	5	1	0	2	2	13	17	−4	5
6	Remparts du Richelieu	5	1	0	0	4	10	19	−9	3

=== Scores ===
- Moncton 4 - Richelieu 1
- Notre Dame 5 - Edmonton 2
- Thunder Bay 2 - Regina 1
- Notre Dame 5 - Richelieu 3
- Edmonton 3 - Thunder Bay 2
- Regina 4 - Moncton 2
- Thunder Bay 5 - Richelieu 1
- Notre Dame 4 - Moncton 3 (OT)
- Regina 2 - Edmonton 1 (OT)
- Thunder Bay 5 - Moncton 2
- Richelieu 4 - Edmonton 3
- Notre Dame 4 - Regina 2
- Edmonton 3 - Moncton 2 (SO)
- Thunder Bay 5 - Notre Dame 1
- Regina 3 - Richelieu 1

== Playoffs ==
=== Semi-finals ===
- Thunder Bay 2 – Edmonton 1
- Notre Dame 5 – Regina 0

=== Bronze-medal game ===
- Edmonton 5 – Regina 1

=== Gold-medal game ===
- Thunder Bay 4 – Notre Dame 3

== Individual awards ==
- Most Valuable Player: Kaitlyn Tougas (Thunder Bay)
- Top Scorer: Brienna Gillanders (Notre Dame)
- Top Forward: Janik Robichaud (Moncton)
- Top Defenceman: Riana Magee (Edmonton)
- Top Goaltender: Samantha Langford (Regina)
- Most Sportsmanlike Player: Kaitlyn Quarrell (Thunder Bay)

== Road to the Esso Cup ==
=== Atlantic Region ===
Regional Tournament held March 18–20, 2010

==== Round robin ====
Pos	Team	Pld	W	L	D	GF	GA	GD	Pts
1	Moncton Rockets	4	4	0	0	48	3	+45	8
2	Metro Boston Pizza	4	3	1	0	26	9	+17	6
3	Western	4	2	2	0	21	30	−9	4
4	Western Wind	4	1	3	0	8	30	−22	2
5	Central (H)	4	0	4	0	11	38	−27	0

(H) Hosts

==== Championship Game ====
- Moncton 4 – Metro 1

Moncton advances to Esso Cup

=== Quebec ===
Dodge Cup Midget Championship held March 31 – April 4, 2010

==== Semi-finals ====
- Bas St-Laurent 1 – Québec 0
- Richelieu 3 – Lac St-Louis 1

==== Championship Game ====
- Richelieu 4 – Bas St-Laurent 1

Richelieu wins Dodge Cup and advances to Esso Cup

=== Ontario ===
Ontario Women's Hockey Association Championship held April 9–11, 2010

==== Semi-finals ====
- Stoney Creek 2 – Brampton 0
- Thunder Bay 3 - Willowdale 0

==== Championship Game ====
- Thunder Bay 1 – Stoney Creek 0

Thunder Bay wins championship and advances to Esso Cup

=== Western Region ===
Best-of-3 series played April 2–4, 2010

Notre Dame Hounds vs Pembina Valley Hawks

- Game 1: Notre Dame 4 - Pembina Valley 3
- Game 2: Notre Dame 3 - Pembina Valley 2

Notre Dame wins series and advances to Esso Cup

=== Pacific Region ===
Best-of-3 series played April 2–4, 2010

Thompson-Okanagan Rockets vs Edmonton Thunder

- Game 1: Edmonton 5 - Thompson-Okanagan 0
- Game 2: Edmonton 3 - Thompson-Okanagan 0

Edmonton wins series and advances to Esso Cup

== See also ==
- Esso Cup
