= Canadian Fossil Discovery Centre =

Coordinates: 49.1978°N 98.0949°W

- Established: 1971
- Location: Morden, Manitoba, Canada
- Type: history museum
- Director: Adolfo Cuetara
- Website: www.discoverfossils.com

The Canadian Fossil Discovery Centre, formerly known as the Morden and District Museum, is a fossil museum located in Morden, Manitoba, in the lower level of the Access Events Centre. The museum currently houses the largest collection of marine reptile fossils in Canada.

== Collections ==
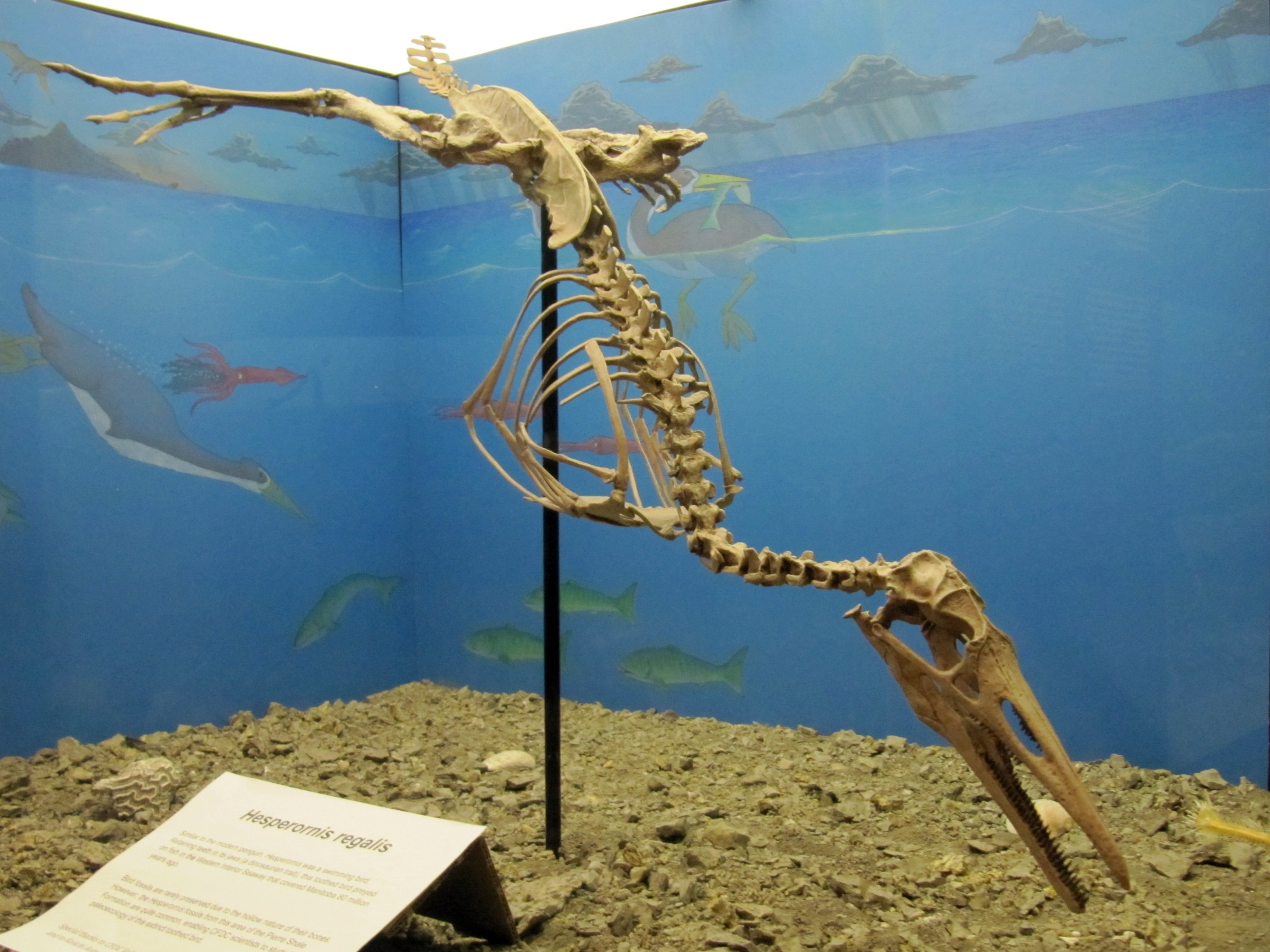
Hesperornis regalis exhibit

Field excavations occur along the Manitoba Escarpment area of the Pembina Hills in the Red River Valley. Most fossils that are collected are from the Pembina and Millwood Members of the Pierre Shale.

The Discovery Centre also houses numerous specimens of the Cretaceous squid Tusoteuthis longa; these specimens represent the northernmost known occurrence of these molluscs in the Cretaceous seas of North America. (Nicholls and Isaak, 1987).

The centre houses the world's largest publicly exhibited mosasaur of the species Tylosaurus pembinensis, Bruce. Bruce received a Guinness World Record on August 22, 2014 and was featured in the 2015 Guinness Book of World Records.

The Museum is affiliated with the Canadian Museums Association, Canadian Heritage Information Network, and Virtual Museum of Canada.

== Programs ==
The Discovery Centre offers school programs, guided tours, summer day camps, paleo tours, fossil dig programs and much more. The museum has a large database of research information pertaining to the fossil collection from the Late Cretaceous Period.

The prized specimen is Bruce, a 43-foot (13 m) long mosasaur fossil, the largest publicly displayed mosasaur in the world.

Fossil dig programs continue each summer, from May to October, along the Manitoba Escarpment. A short necked plesiosaur specimen 26 feet (7.9 m) long was excavated in 2004/5, and the former executive director Anita Janzic has published two scientific abstracts on the specimen and its stomach contents. (Janzic 2007; Janzic 2006)

== Plans ==
The Canadian Fossil Discovery Centre is in the early fundraising stages to build a new museum.

Details of the entire fossil collection have been digitized and uploaded to the internet in a groundbreaking move to provide access to the fossil collection to paleontology researchers and students worldwide. Other projects include a series of 4 education kits for grades K - 12, which will bring the museum content and subject matter into the Manitoba school curriculum.

== Multimedia ==
The film producer, David Rabinovitch of Fleetwood Films has produced a 4-minute introductory film, a 20-minute educational film and is working to secure funding to produce a documentary film. The film will include the story of how 'Bruce' the huge mosasaur on display in the museum gallery was discovered on the Manitoba Escarpment, was then excavated and brought to the City of Morden; and how this started the Canadian Fossil Discovery Centre back in 1971.

== Research ==
Scientific research is at an all-time high in the museum departments of vertebrate paleontology and geology. Current research is focused on marine paleoecology of the Western Interior Seaway, stomach contents of plesiosaurs, stratigraphic cartography and the use of ArcGIS along with geochemical analysis of the bentonite stringers located in the upland region of Pembina Mountain. Visiting researchers from Japan, China, England and the United States are also assisting us with various other research endeavors relating to the marine waters of the Late Cretaceous Period in Manitoba.

The Canadian Fossil Discovery Centre hosts the bi-annual Manitoba Paleontology Symposium to help facilitate awareness of this research and the overall advancement of paleontological research within the province and throughout the various communities of Canadian paleontology.

In 2016 Keiichi Aotsuka announced the discovery of a new species of marine bird from the collection of the centre named Hesperornis lumgairi.

== Honours ==
The Canadian Fossil Discovery Centre was given the status of a "Manitoba Star Attraction" in 2005 by Travel Manitoba.

In late 2014 the Guinness World Records awarded the museum with a record for Largest Publicly Displayed Mosasaur: Bruce. The record was added to the 2016 print edition of the Guinness World Records.

In 2015 Canada Post released a stamp based on the museum's Bruce Mosasaur as part of a five stamp Dino Series.

In 2015 the centre was instrumental in establishing the mosasaur as the official fossil emblem of the province of Manitoba.

In 2016 the Canadian Fossil Discovery Centre became the seventh Signature Museum in the province of Manitoba.
