= Alex Poznikoff =

Canadian ice hockey forward

- Born: May 16, 1997 (age 29) Edmonton, Alberta, Canada
- Height: 5 ft 3 in (160 cm)
- Weight: 130 lb (59 kg; 9 st 4 lb)
- Position: Forward
- Shoots: Right
- PWHL team Former teams: Montreal Victoire; Alberta Pandas
- National team: Canada
- Playing career: 2015–present
Medal record
Women's ice hockey
Representing Canada
Universiade
Silver medal – second place	2017 Almaty

Alexandra Poznikoff (born May 16, 1997) is a Canadian professional ice hockey player for the Montreal Victoire of the Professional Women's Hockey League (PWHL).

== Playing career ==
Poznikoff played on boy's youth hockey teams until her mid-teens. She was named MVP of the 2014 Esso Cup, after scoring 10 points in 7 games and winning a silver medal.

She played for the Alberta Pandas of the University of Alberta, where she scored 125 points in 125 games. She was named USports Player of the Year in 2019, the first Alberta Pandas player to win the award in a decade. She suffered a broken leg halfway through her final season, when she was leading the conference in scoring. She was able to return in time for the national playoffs, before they were cancelled by the COVID-19 pandemic.

After graduating, she joined the PWHPA for the 2020–21 season.

=== International ===
Poznikoff represented Canada at the 2017 Winter Universiade, scoring three points in five games helping the Canadians to win the silver medals.

== Career statistics ==
			Regular season					Playoffs
Season	Team	League	GP	G	A	Pts	PIM	GP	G	A	Pts	PIM
2015-16	Alberta Pandas	U Sports	28	11	5	16	14	–	–	–	–	–
2016-17	Alberta Pandas	U Sports	24	13	12	25	12	–	–	–	–	–
2017-18	Alberta Pandas	U Sports	28	12	11	23	10	5	2	1	3	2
2018-19	Alberta Pandas	U Sports	27	15	22	37	6	4	3	0	3	0
2019-20	Alberta Pandas	U Sports	18	9	15	24	10	3	1	0	1	2
2020-21	Independent	PWHPA	–	–	–	–	–	–	–	–	–	–
U Sports totals			125	60	65	125	52	12	6	1	7	4

== Personal life ==
Poznikoff is a member of the LGBTQ community and became engaged to long-term partner Janelle Froehler, former fellow Alberta Pandas player, in October 2024.
