= Thomas Duncan (Canadian politician) =

Canadian politician

Thomas Duncan (ca 1850 – October 27, 1910) was a Scottish-born blacksmith and political figure in Manitoba. He represented Morden from 1892 to 1899 in the Legislative Assembly of Manitoba as a Liberal.

He was born in Tannadice, Forfarshire and educated in Kirriemuir. Duncan came to Canada in 1871, coming west to Manitoba in 1874. He served as mayor of Nelson from 1886 to 1887 and as warden for North Dufferin from 1884 to 1885.

After he retired from politics in 1899, Duncan was employed with the Canadian immigration department. His job brought him to Syracuse, New York, where he died of typhoid pneumonia in 1910.
