= Carrie Hiebert =

Canadian politician

Carrie Hiebert MLA

Member of the Legislative Assembly of Manitoba for Morden-Winkler
- Incumbent
- Assumed office October 3, 2023
- Preceded by: Cameron Friesen

Personal details
- Born: August 30
- Party: Progressive Conservative
- Education: Red River College Polytechnic

Carrie Hiebert is a Canadian politician, who was elected to the Legislative Assembly of Manitoba in the 2023 Manitoba general election. She represents the district of Morden-Winkler as a member of the Progressive Conservative Party of Manitoba.

Prior to being elected, Hiebert worked for Conservative MP Candice Bergen and for PC MLA Cameron Friesen.

On October 24, 2023, she was appointed as the Shadow Minister for Housing, Addictions and Homelessness.

== Electoral record ==
2023 Manitoba general election: Morden-Winkler
Party	Candidate	Votes	%	±%	Expenditures
Progressive Conservative	Carrie Hiebert	5,135	73.47	-7.39	$13,788.39
New Democratic	Ken Friesen	1,600	22.89	+18.06	$1,413.79
Liberal	Mattison Froese	254	3.63	-0.03	$0.00
Total valid votes/expense limit		6,989	99.33	–	$61,890.00
Total rejected and declined ballots		47	0.67	–	
Turnout		7,036	44.32	-6.87	
Eligible voters		15,875			
Progressive Conservative hold		Swing		-12.72	
Source(s) Source: Elections Manitoba
