= Alexander Lawrence (politician) =

Canadian politician

Alexander Lawrence (c. 1847 – August 4, 1899) was a Scottish-born farmer and political figure in Manitoba. He represented Morden from 1888 to 1892 in the Legislative Assembly of Manitoba as a Liberal.

He was born in Kinross-shire, the son of John Lawrence, and was educated in Scotland and England. In 1880, Lawrence married Margaret Bond. He died in Gretna, Manitoba at the age of 52.
