= Alexander Waldemar Lawrence =

British solicitor (1874–1939)

Sir Alexander Waldemar Lawrence, 4th Baronet (18 May 1874 – 1 September 1939) was a British solicitor and politician.

General election January 1910: Norwood
Party	Candidate	Votes	%	±%
Conservative	Harry Samuel	6,958	57.3	
Liberal	Alexander Waldemar Lawrence	5,180	42.7	
Majority		1,778	14.6	
Turnout				
Conservative hold		Swing	+3.3	

Baronetage of the United Kingdom
Preceded by Henry Waldemar Lawrence	Baronet (of Lucknow); 1908–1939	Succeeded by Henry Waldemar Lawrence
