= Esso Cup =

Canadian women's under-18 ice hockey championship

- Current season, competition or edition: 2026 Esso Cup
- Sport: Ice hockey
- First season: 2008-09
- Most recent champion: Red Deer Sutter Fund Chiefs (2026)
- Most titles: St. Albert Slash (3)
- Broadcasters: TSN (English); RDS (French)
- Sponsors: Hockey Canada; Esso
- Website: https://www.hockeycanada.ca/en-ca/national-championships/women/u18-club

The Esso Cup is the Canadian national women's under-18 ice hockey club championship, sponsored by Esso. It is an annual event, sanctioned by Hockey Canada, that takes place each April. The current champions are the Red Deer Sutter Fund Chiefs, who won the 2026 Esso Cup in Dieppe, New Brunswick.

== History ==
The forerunner to the Esso Cup was the Esso Women's Hockey Nationals, which was the Canadian senior women's championship from 1982 to 2008. With the evolution of the Nationals into a professional tournament, Hockey Canada elected to discontinue it in 2008 and replace it with a national female U18 championship known as the Esso Cup.

The inaugural Esso Cup was played in April 2009 in Calgary, Alberta. The Westman Wildcats from Souris, Manitoba, were the first gold medalists. The St. Albert Slash of Alberta are the only team to win the event multiple times.

== Format ==
The Esso Cup follows Hockey Canada's standard six-team national championship format. Branch champions compete in regional playoffs; the regional winners and a predetermined host team then compete for the national championship. In years when not all regions have participated in the Esso Cup, another region has been allowed to send a second team to keep the field at six teams. The exception to this was in 2022 when regional playoffs were cancelled and all branch champions were promoted directly to the national championship.

The Esso Cup uses the IIHF points system for the round robin, which awards three points for a win in regulation time. If the game is decided in overtime or a shootout, the winning team receives two points and the losing team receives one. No points are awarded for losing a game in regulation time. After the round robin is complete, the top four teams (by points) qualify for the playoff round.

Each year's gold medal game is televised nationally on TSN and RDS.

== Winners and hosts ==
Esso Cup
| Year | Gold Medal | Silver Medal | Bronze Medal | Location |
|---|---|---|---|---|
| 2009 | Westman Wildcats | Scarborough Sharks | Calgary Flyers | Calgary, AB |
| 2010 | Thunder Bay Queens | Notre Dame Hounds | Edmonton Thunder | Regina, SK |
| 2011 | Notre Dame Hounds | Edmonton Thunder | Toronto Aeros | St. Albert, AB |
| 2012 | Pembina Valley Hawks | Thunder Bay Queens | Edmonton Thunder | Charlottetown, PE |
| 2013 | LHFDQ North | North Bay Ice Boltz | Edmonton Thunder | Burnaby, BC |
| 2014 | Weyburn Goldwings | Edmonton Thunder | Sudbury Lady Wolves | Hamilton, ON |
| 2015 | Sudbury Lady Wolves | Red Deer Sutter Fund Chiefs | Saskatoon Stars | Red Deer, AB |
| 2016 | Brantford Ice Cats | Express du Richelieu | Rocky Mountain Raiders | Weyburn, SK |
| 2017 | St. Albert Slash | Harfangs de Triolet | Durham West Lightning | Morden, MB |
| 2018 | St. Albert Slash | Saskatoon Stars | Pionnières de Lanaudière | Bridgewater, NS |
| 2019 | St. Albert Slash | Sudbury Lady Wolves | Stony Creek Sabres | Sudbury, ON |
| 2020 | cancelled (Note: Hockey Canada cancelled the 2020 and 2021 Esso Cups in response to the COVID-19 pandemic) | | | Prince Albert, SK |
| 2021 | cancelled | | | Lloydminster, AB |
| 2022 | Durham West Lightning | Fraser Valley Rush | | Okotoks, AB |
| 2023 | Stoney Creek Sabres | Fraser Valley Rush | Regina Rebels | Prince Albert, SK |
| 2024 | Regina Rebels | North York Storm | Edmonton Jr. Oilers | Vernon, BC |
| 2025 | Edmonton Jr. Oilers | Saskatoon Stars | North York Storm | Lloydminster, SK |
| 2026 | Red Deer Sutter Fund Chiefs | Stoney Creek Sabres | Northern Selects | Dieppe, New Brunswick |

== All-time results by region ==
Medals by Region
| Region | Branches | Gold | Silver | Bronze |
|---|---|---|---|---|
| Ontario | Ontario, Eastern Ontario, Northwestern Ontario | 5 | 5 | 4 |
| Western | Manitoba, Saskatchewan | 5 | 2 | 2 |
| Pacific | British Columbia, Alberta | 4 | 4 | 4 |
| Québec | Quebec | 1 | 2 | 1 |
| Host | | 0 | 2 | 1 |
| Atlantic | New Brunswick, Nova Scotia, Prince Edward Island, Newfoundland and Labrador | 0 | 0 | 1 |

As of 2025-26 season
Note: The Quebec region has not participated every year. In such years, a second team from another region has qualified in their place.

== See also ==
- Telus Cup
- National Women's Under-18 Championship
- Esso Women's Hockey Nationals
