= Morden, Manitoba =

Morden
- City
- City of Morden
- Seal
- Motto: City of Discovery
- City boundaries

- Location of Morden
- Coordinates: 49°11′31″N 98°06′02″W
- Country: Canada
- Province: Manitoba
- Region: Pembina Valley
- Rural Municipality: Stanley
- Established: 1882
- Incorporated: 1895 (village); 1903 (town); 2012 (city)

Government
  - Mayor: Nancy Penner
  - Governing Body: Morden City Council
  - MP (Portage—Lisgar): Branden Leslie
  - MLA (Morden-Winkler): Carrie Hiebert

Area
  - Total: 12.44 km^{2} (4.80 sq mi)

Population (2021)
  - Total: 9,929
  - Density: 401/km^{2} (1,040/sq mi)
- Time zone: UTC-6 (CST)
  - Summer (DST): UTC-5 (CDT)
- Forward sortation area: R6M
- Website: www.morden.ca

Morden is a city located in the Pembina Valley region of southern Manitoba, Canada, near the United States border. It is about 11 km (6.8 mi) west of the neighbouring city of Winkler and they are often referred to as Manitoba's Twin Cities. Morden, which is surrounded by the Rural Municipality of Stanley, is the eighth largest and fastest-growing city in Manitoba. According to Statistics Canada, the city had a population of 9,929 in 2021, an increase of 14.5% from 2016, making it Manitoba's fastest growing city.

== History ==
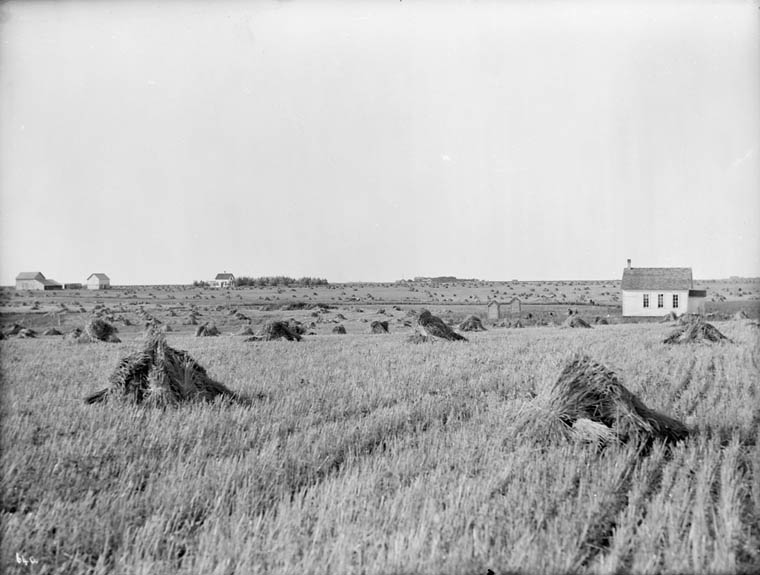
A school house from before 1923.

Morden was founded in 1882, when the Canadian Pacific Railway built a railway line crossing the Dead Horse Creek (called Le Cheval Mort by the French fur traders) at a place then known as Cheval. This spot became a popular resting place as it was ideal to provide water for drinking and locomotives. The settlement was renamed "Morden", after Alvey Morden, on whose family's land the community was established. Morden was incorporated as a municipality on January 1, 1882. The Manitoba government granted Morden town status in 1903 and later city status in 2012.

== Geography ==
=== Climate ===
Morden has a humid continental climate (Köppen climate classification Dfb, USDA Plant Hardiness Zone 3a) with hot summers and cold winters. The average high in July is 25.6 °C (78.1 °F) and the average low is 14.3 °C (57.7 °F). Since the Morden area experiences some of the warmest temperatures in Manitoba, it has become a centre for agricultural and horticultural research. Since 1915, the city has been home to the Morden Research and Development Centre, which is operated by the Government of Canada. The average high in January is −10.0 °C (14.0 °F) and the average low is −19.1 °C (−2.4 °F). The highest temperature ever recorded in Morden was 111 °F (43.9 °C) on 11 July 1936. The coldest temperature ever recorded was −42.0 °C (−43.6 °F) on 16 January 1993.

Climate data for Morden CDA, 1981–2010 normals, extremes 1904–present
Month	Jan	Feb	Mar	Apr	May	Jun	Jul	Aug	Sep	Oct	Nov	Dec	Year
Record high °C (°F)	13.9 (57.0)	14.4 (57.9)	28.3 (82.9)	36.5 (97.7)	42.2 (108.0)	40.6 (105.1)	43.9 (111.0)	40.6 (105.1)	40.0 (104.0)	33.5 (92.3)	24.4 (75.9)	17.8 (64.0)	43.9 (111.0)
Mean daily maximum °C (°F)	−10.0 (14.0)	−6.3 (20.7)	−0.3 (31.5)	10.6 (51.1)	19.3 (66.7)	23.4 (74.1)	25.6 (78.1)	25.6 (78.1)	19.2 (66.6)	10.9 (51.6)	−0.8 (30.6)	−8.3 (17.1)	9.1 (48.4)
Daily mean °C (°F)	−14.6 (5.7)	−10.7 (12.7)	−4.3 (24.3)	4.9 (40.8)	12.7 (54.9)	17.6 (63.7)	20.0 (68.0)	19.5 (67.1)	13.4 (56.1)	6.0 (42.8)	−4.6 (23.7)	−12.3 (9.9)	4.0 (39.2)
Mean daily minimum °C (°F)	−19.1 (−2.4)	−15.1 (4.8)	−8.3 (17.1)	−0.9 (30.4)	6.0 (42.8)	11.8 (53.2)	14.3 (57.7)	13.2 (55.8)	7.7 (45.9)	1.0 (33.8)	−8.3 (17.1)	−16.2 (2.8)	−1.2 (29.8)
Record low °C (°F)	−42.0 (−43.6)	−41.7 (−43.1)	−37.8 (−36.0)	−22.2 (−8.0)	−15.0 (5.0)	−2.7 (27.1)	−0.6 (30.9)	−1.1 (30.0)	−12.2 (10.0)	−20.5 (−4.9)	−34.0 (−29.2)	−37.8 (−36.0)	−42.0 (−43.6)
Average precipitation mm (inches)	18.8 (0.74)	18.9 (0.74)	22.5 (0.89)	34.6 (1.36)	58.4 (2.30)	92.9 (3.66)	79.4 (3.13)	70.8 (2.79)	44.5 (1.75)	49.9 (1.96)	29.9 (1.18)	20.2 (0.80)	540.8 (21.29)
Average rainfall mm (inches)	0.4 (0.02)	2.4 (0.09)	8.6 (0.34)	21.7 (0.85)	56.4 (2.22)	92.9 (3.66)	79.4 (3.13)	70.8 (2.79)	44.1 (1.74)	42.9 (1.69)	4.7 (0.19)	2.2 (0.09)	426.5 (16.79)
Average snowfall cm (inches)	19.0 (7.5)	16.5 (6.5)	13.9 (5.5)	13.1 (5.2)	2.0 (0.8)	0.0 (0.0)	0.0 (0.0)	0.0 (0.0)	0.4 (0.2)	7.0 (2.8)	25.6 (10.1)	18.0 (7.1)	115.6 (45.5)
Average precipitation days (≥ 0.2 mm)	10.9	8.9	9.2	7.1	10.6	14.2	12.4	10.2	9.1	9.7	8.7	10.8	121.8
Average rainy days (≥ 0.2 mm)	0.78	1.1	3.3	5.1	10.3	14.2	12.4	10.2	9.1	8.0	2.3	0.65	77.4
Average snowy days (≥ 0.2 cm)	10.5	8.2	6.7	3.0	0.33	0.0	0.0	0.0	0.17	2.3	7.1	10.2	48.6
Mean monthly sunshine hours	108.5	129.2	161.3	226.9	266.6	270.8	300.7	285.4	192.7	150.4	92.4	93.0	2,277.8
Percentage possible sunshine	40.2	45.3	43.8	55.2	56.2	55.9	61.5	64.0	50.8	44.8	33.5	36.2	49.0
Source: Environment Canada

== Demographics ==
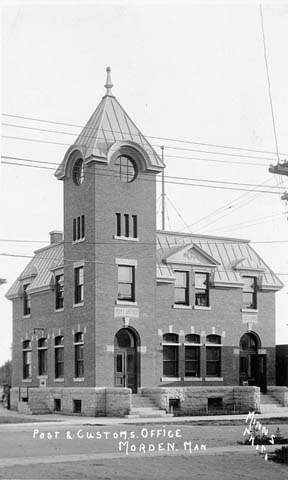
Post office circa 1914

Historical population
Year	Pop.	±%
1901	1,522	—
1911	1,130	−25.8%
1921	1,268	+12.2%
1931	1,416	+11.7%
1941	1,427	+0.8%
1951	1,862	+30.5%
1961	2,793	+50.0%
1996	5,689	+103.7%
2001	6,159	+8.3%
2006	6,571	+6.7%
2011	7,812	+18.9%
2016	8,668	+11.0%
2021	9,929	+14.5%

In the 2021 Census of Population conducted by Statistics Canada, Morden had a population of 9,929 living in 3,995 of its 4,162 total private dwellings, a change of 14.5% from its 2016 population of 8,668. With a land area of 16.29 km^{2} (6.29 sq mi), it had a population density of 609.5/km^{2} (1,578.6/sq mi) in 2021.

Panethnic groups in the City of Morden (2001−2021)
Panethnic group	2021		2016		2011		2006		2001	
Panethnic group	Pop.	%	Pop.	%	Pop.	%	Pop.	%	Pop.	%
European (Note: Statistic includes all persons that did not make up part of a visible minority or an indigenous identity.)	8,320	85.73%	7,900	93%	7,195	93.87%	6,100	93.92%	5,810	96.03%
Southeast Asian (Note: Statistic includes total responses of "Filipino" and "Southeast Asian" under visible minority section on census.)	485	5%	45	0.53%	0	0%	25	0.38%	50	0.83%
Indigenous	480	4.95%	335	3.94%	315	4.11%	265	4.08%	130	2.15%
Latin American	135	1.39%	35	0.41%	15	0.2%	0	0%	0	0%
South Asian	105	1.08%	25	0.29%	40	0.52%	0	0%	0	0%
African	85	0.88%	95	1.12%	25	0.33%	25	0.38%	10	0.17%
East Asian (Note: Statistic includes total responses of "Chinese", "Korean", and "Japanese" under visible minority section on census.)	30	0.31%	35	0.41%	0	0%	50	0.77%	20	0.33%
Middle Eastern (Note: Statistic includes total responses of "West Asian" and "Arab" under visible minority section on census.)	30	0.31%	30	0.35%	30	0.39%	40	0.62%	30	0.5%
Other/multiracial (Note: Statistic includes total responses of "Visible minority, n.i.e." and "Multiple visible minorities" under visible minority section on census.)	0	0%	0	0%	0	0%	0	0%	0	0%
Total responses	9,705	97.74%	8,495	98%	7,665	98.12%	6,495	98.84%	6,050	98.23%
Total population	9,929	100%	8,668	100%	7,812	100%	6,571	100%	6,159	100%
Note: Totals greater than 100% due to multiple origin responses

== Arts and culture ==
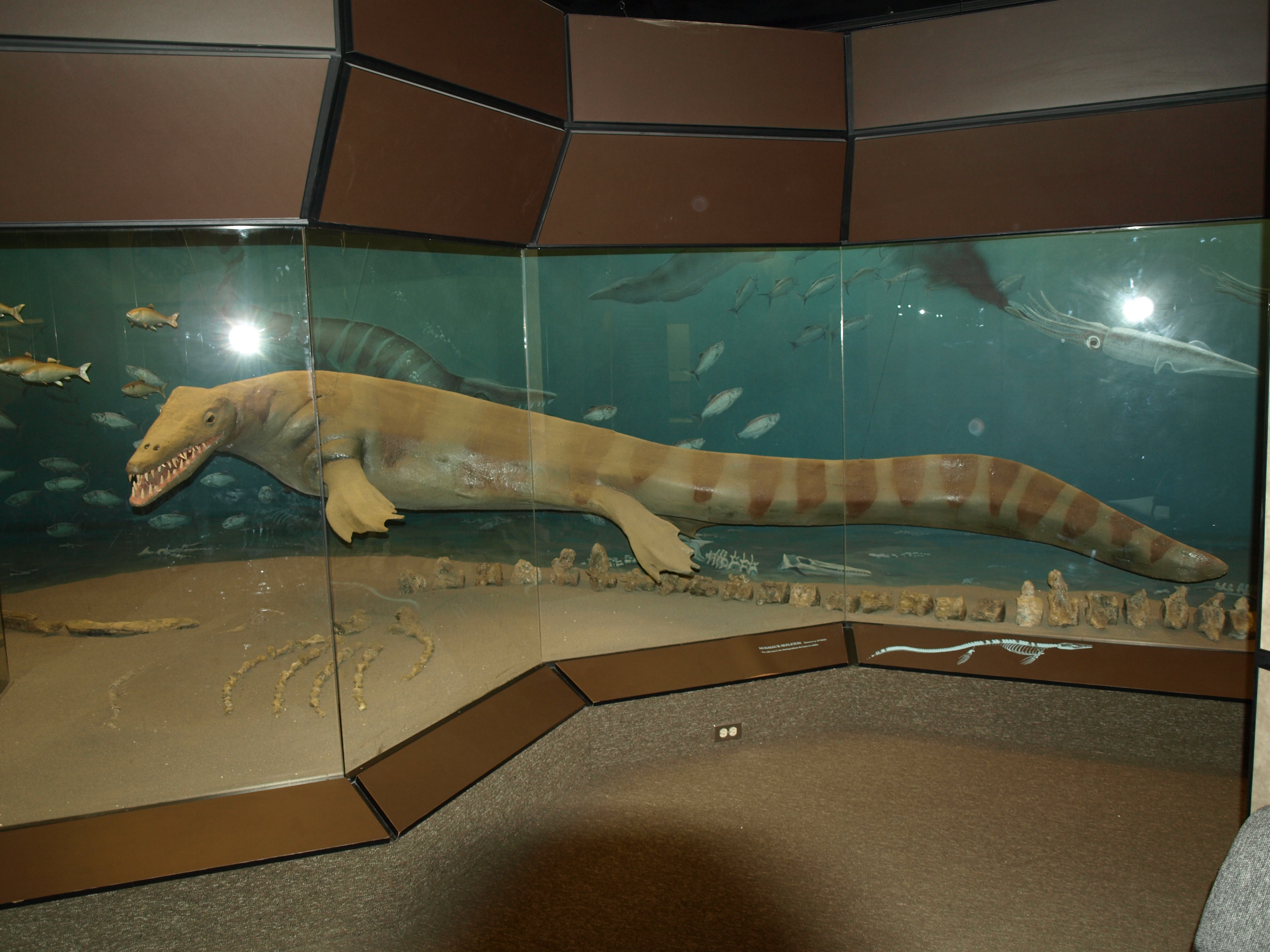
Canadian Fossil Discovery Centre

Morden is home to the largest collection of marine reptile fossils in Canada, located at the Canadian Fossil Discovery Centre. Their collection includes a 13-metre-long, 80 million year old mosasaur (nicknamed "Bruce"); it is a Guinness Record holder as the largest mosasaur on public display.

Pembina Hills Art Gallery is located in Morden.

In 2008, Morden was designated a "Cultural Capital" by the Minister of Canadian Heritage and Status of Women in 2008 for its emphasis on art and culture. This includes hosting various festivals such as the Back Forty Festival, which highlights aboriginal influences in the community. Award money was spent on a new performing arts centre, and four murals.

=== Corn and Apple Festival ===
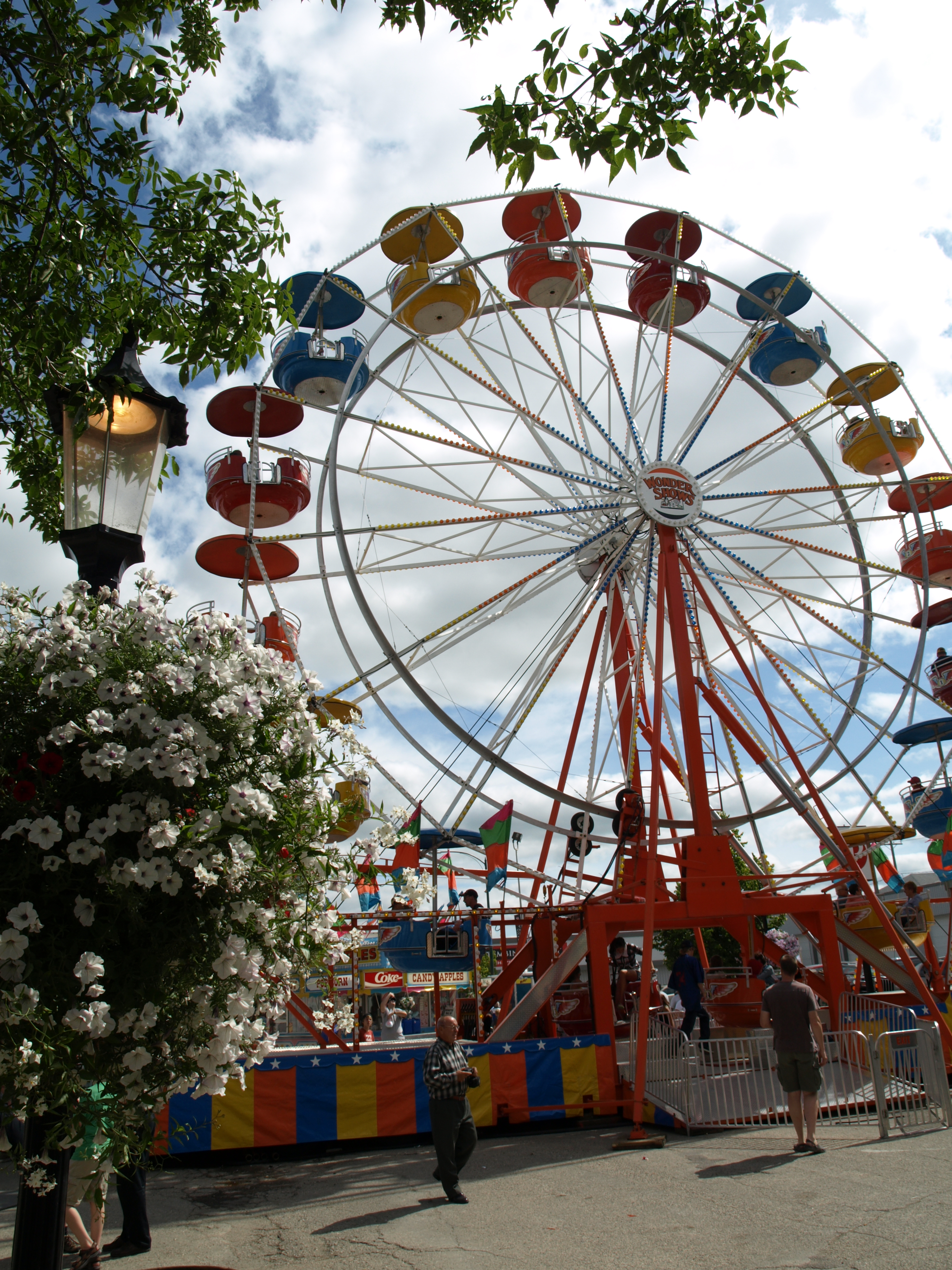
Morden Corn and Apple Festival

Morden holds the Corn and Apple Festival each August. Founded in 1967, the festival includes free corn and apple cider, and celebrates a fruit and vegetable that thrive in Morden's long growing season. Notable entertainers at past festivals include Prairie Oyster, Colin James, Dr. Hook, Randy Bachman, The Trews, Chad Brownlee, and Rick Mercer.

Morden's quaint and historic downtown was featured in the 2020 TV series Tales from the Loop by Amazon Prime Video and the 2022 Hallmark Channel TV film Pumpkin Everything. In 2023 Still Standing, a Canadian Broadcasting Corporation TV show about "towns that are against the ropes but still hanging in there", featured the city of Morden.

== Attractions ==
The community's recreation hub is the Access Event Centre. The multi-purpose facility houses two indoor arenas, a 1,000-seat community hall, the Manitoba Baseball Hall of Fame, as well as banquet and conference rooms. The lower level of the facility is home to the Canadian Fossil Discovery Centre.

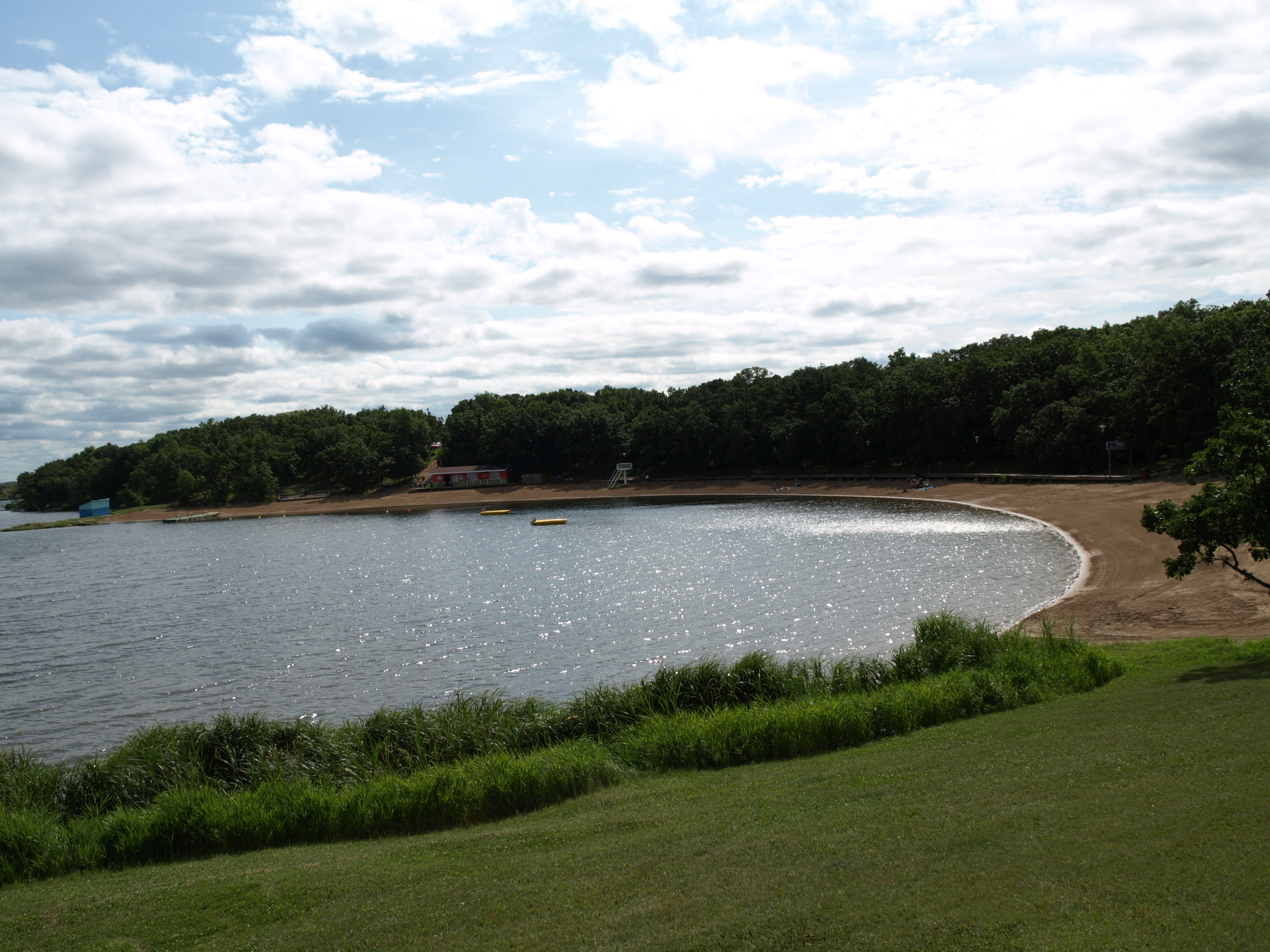
The beach in Morden.

== Sports ==
Morden is home to various ice hockey teams, including the Morden Bombers of the South Eastern Manitoba Hockey League, Morden Thunder of the Manitoba High School Hockey League, and the Pembina Valley Hawks of the Manitoba Female Hockey League. The 2017 Esso Cup, Canada's national female midget hockey championship, was hosted by the Hawks in Morden.

The Morden Mud Hens are the men's senior baseball team that plays in the Border Baseball League and captured a provincial title in 2018.

Morden has been the host of the Manitoba Games in its summer and winter editions in 1996 and 2014 respectively.

== Government ==
Morden federal election results
Year	Liberal		Conservative		New Democratic		Green		PPC		Others	
2021	10%	469	51%	2,342	19%	886	0%	0	18%	816	1%	48
2019	10%	445	67%	2,891	9%	388	8%	351	4%	157	2%	65

Morden provincial election results
Year	PC		New Democratic		Liberal		Green	
2019	71%	2,287	8%	245	5%	173	16%	501
2016	77%	2,098	5%	137	5%	150	13%	355

Morden is governed by a mayor and six councilors who are elected by residents. The current mayor of Morden is Nancy Penner, who won the 2020 Municipal By-Election with 1,567 votes. Councilor Doug Frost currently serves as Deputy Mayor. Also serving on the City of Morden Council are Councilor Gord Maddock, Councilor Garry Hiebert, Councilor Brenda Klassen, Councilor Tracey Krause, and Councilor Sheldon Friesen. The City of Morden City Manager has been Nicole Reidle since the spring of 2020.

Morden is represented in the Legislative Assembly of Manitoba (as part of the Morden-Winkler riding) by Progressive Conservative MLA Carrie Hiebert and in the House of Commons of Canada (as part of the Portage—Lisgar riding) by Conservative MP Branden Leslie.

== Infrastructure ==
=== Transportation ===
Roadways in Morden include: Provincial Road 432, Manitoba Provincial Highway 3, and Manitoba Highway 14.

Morden is located 21.5 km (13.4 mi) north of the United States border.

Morden is served by a small rural airport, Morden Regional Aerodrome. The city has a taxi service. Greyhound provides a courier service to Morden; passenger service was discontinued. Morden is bisected by the Canadian Pacific Railway, running east–west. The Boundary Trail Railway interlinks with the Canadian Pacific in Morden.

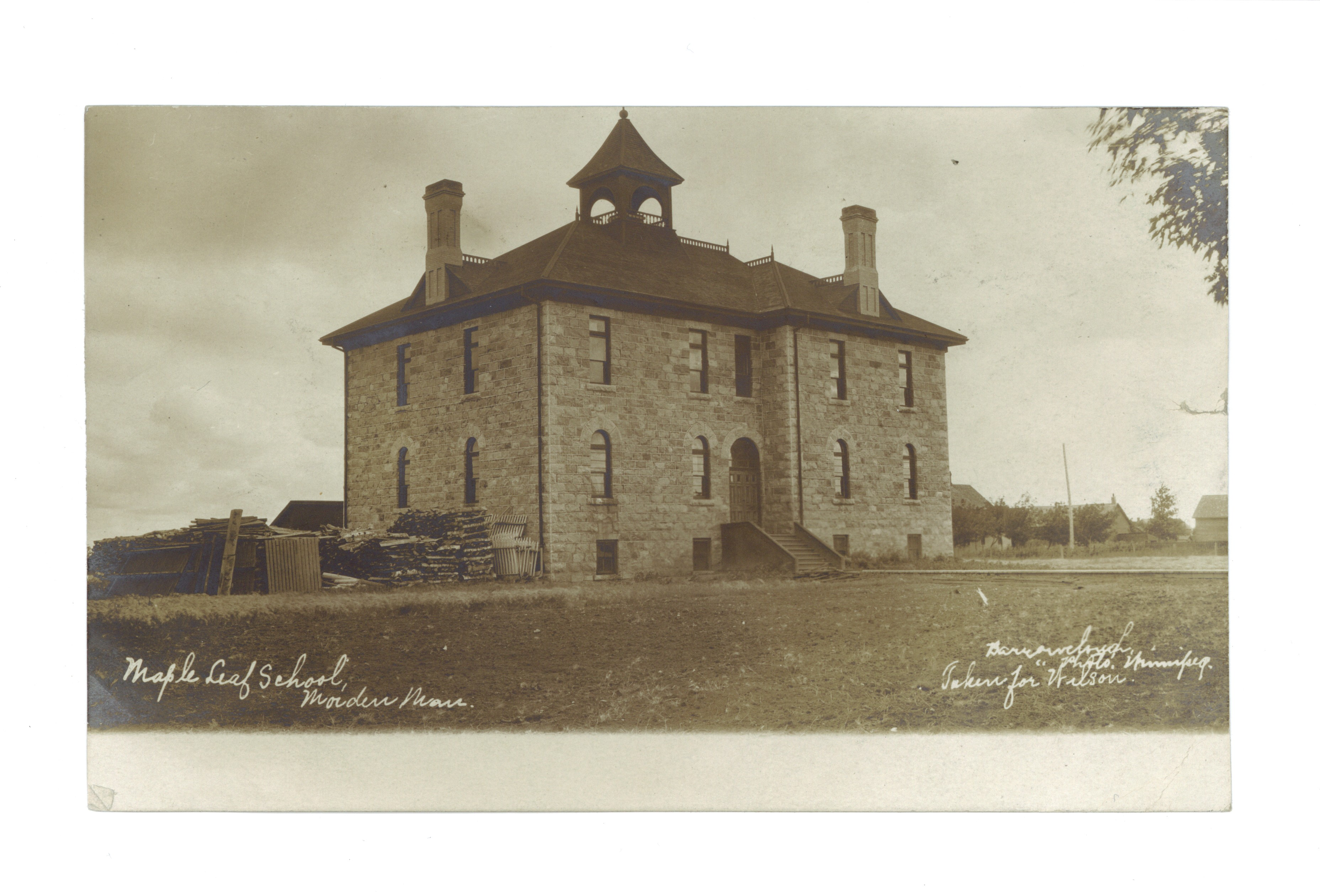
Maple Leaf School, pre 1912

== Education ==
Morden public schools are part of the Western School Division, which consists of three elementary schools - Maple Leaf Elementary School, Minnewasta Elementary School and École Discovery Trails, one middle school, École Morden Middle School, one high school, Morden Collegiate Institute and an Adult Education centre.

Morden is also home to a branch of Campus Manitoba, providing post-secondary courses from Red River College.

== Media ==
Morden's local newspaper is The Winkler-Morden Voice, also published weekly and distributed by mail to households in both Winkler and Morden and many surrounding smaller communities. A previous paper, The Morden Times, closed in 2020.

== Notable people ==
- George Thomas Armstrong, politician
- George Ashdown, politician
- Jim Barrie, politician
- Lillian Beynon Thomas, journalist and feminist
- Candice Bergen, politician
- Jeff Blair, journalist
- John Alton Duncan, judge
- Kristen Foster, curler
- Cameron Friesen, politician
- Henry Friesen, an endocrinologist
- Chay Genoway, an ice hockey player for the Hershey Bears
- Colby Genoway, hockey player
- Keith Hamel, musician
- Jake Hoeppner, politician
- Charles Holland Locke, judge
- John MacAulay, lawyer
- Benjamin McConnell, politician
- Loreena McKennitt, Celtic musician
- Casey Plett, writer
- Don Rudd, curler
- John Ruddell, politician
- Brent Stewart, judge
- William Tobias, politician
- Howard Winkler, politician
- Valentine Winkler, politician
- Wooden Sky, band
- A.E. Van Vogt, sci-fi writer
- Taylor Woods, hockey player
