= BC Female Midget AAA Hockey League =

Minor ice hockey league in British Columbia

- Sport: Ice hockey
- Founded: 2007
- Founder: British Columbia Amateur Hockey Association
- CEO: Jeremy Ainsworth (interim); Jen Cheeseman (interim)
- No. of teams: 5
- Country: Canada
- Confederation: Hockey Canada
- Most recent champion: Greater Vancouver Comets (2018–19)
- Domestic cup: Esso Cup
- Website: Official stats site

The British Columbia Female Midget AAA Hockey League (BCFMAAA) is the highest-level provincial women's minor ice hockey league in British Columbia, Canada. It is run by the British Columbia Amateur Hockey Association (BC Hockey), a member of Hockey Canada and the regional governing body of ice hockey in British Columbia. The league comprises five teams, representing four geographic "zones", and is played over a 32 game regular season. The winning team of the league playoffs has the opportunity to compete for the ESSO Cup, Hockey Canada's National Female Midget Championship.

== About ==
The BC FMAAA was initiated in the 2007–08 season in response to the membership's desire to provide "an opportunity for elite female hockey players to come together on zone teams to challenge other elite Female Midget teams." It is the women's counterpart of the BC Major Midget League.

Prior to the 2015–16 season, local minor hockey associations were required to host their major midget teams, and oversee them accordingly. Beginning in the 2015–16 season, the oversight of teams and registration of players was centralized under the provincial association, BC Hockey, with the intention of moving toward greater standardization. BC Hockey became responsible for creating the league's schedule, administrating the league's finances, funding and scheduling ice and dryland training, and providing honorariums for team staff. An academic advisor was made available to all teams to educate players about post-secondary options. Through BC Hockey's partner agreements, the FMAAA teams receive support in the form of uniforms, equipment, and team apparel from Bauer Hockey; charter bus transportation from International Stage Lines; and accommodation from Sandman Hotels.

Members of the Vancouver Island Seals and their parents registered complaints with the media in April 2019 about the Vancouver Island Amateur Hockey Association (VIAHA) and BC Hockey's handling of the team. Yannick Truter, the Seals' captain during the 2018–19 season, called on BC Hockey to refund the approximately $7,500 the organization collected from each player, after the team was provided only two practice slots for the entire season and four slots for games. They alleged that "without club and parental support, as well as sympathetic local associations and rinks, the team wouldn’t have been able to function." The situation was underscored by the downward trend of VIAHA participation by female players, which decreased from 390 registered players in 2014 to just 260 players five years later.

In January 2020, the league hosted what is believed to be the first female midget AAA outdoor game ever played in Canada. The Northern Capitals hosted the Greater Vancouver Comets for the historic game at Ernie Sam Memorial Arena in Fort St. James, which ended with a 4–0 victory for the Comets.

== Teams ==
Location of teams in the BC Female Midget AAA Hockey League

The league comprised five teams in the 2019–20 season: the Fraser Valley Rush, the Greater Vancouver Comets, the Northern Capitals, the Thompson-Okanagan Lakers and the Vancouver Island Seals. Each team recruits players from a distinct geographic zone, with the exception of the Fraser Valley Rush and the Greater Vancouver Comets, which share the Greater Vancouver Zone; prospective players much choose a team to tryout with from the two.

=== 2019–20 season ===
Team	Location	BC Hockey Zone	Home venue	Former name(s)
Fraser Valley Rush	Langley	Greater Vancouver	Langley Sportsplex	Fraser Valley Phantom, 2007–2015
Greater Vancouver Comets	Coquitlam	Greater Vancouver	Planet Ice Coquitlam	Vancouver Fusion, 2007–2012 West Coast Avalanche, 2013–2015
Northern Capitals	Prince George	North	Rolling Mix Concrete Arena	Prince George Cougars, 2008–2013 Northern Cougars, 2013–2015
Thompson-Okanagan Lakers	Vernon	Okanagan	Kal Tire Place	Okanagan Rockets, 2008–09 Thompson-Okanagan Rockets, 2009–2014
Vancouver Island Seals	Victoria/Campbell River	Vancouver Island	Various	Vancouver Island Hurricanes, 2013–2015

=== Past participants ===
- Kootenay Wild (2015–2017), Kootenay Wildcats (2007–2017), based out of Castlegar in the Kootenay Zone

== Notable alumni ==
Players are noted with their active team during the 2020–21 season.

- Danielle Butler (Thompson-Okanagan Rockets, 2011–12 and 2013–14), player with the EC Bergkamener Bären of the German Women's Ice Hockey Bundesliga (DFEL)
- Hannah Clayton-Carroll (West Coast Avalanche, 2013–14), forward with Göteborg HC of the Swedish Women's Hockey League (SDHL)
- Whitney Dove (Fraser Valley Phantom, 2012–13), defenceman with the Buffalo Beauts of the National Women's Hockey League (NWHL)
- Alex Gowie (Thompson-Okanagan Rockets, 2009–10), player with the Hungarian national team and MAC Budapest of the European Women's Hockey League (EWHL)
- Ella Matteucci (Kootenay Wildcats, 2009–10), player affiliated with the Toronto chapter of the Professional Women's Hockey Players Association (PWHPA)
- Kiana Wilkinson (Prince George Cougars, 2012–13), defenceman with the KRS Vanke Rays Shenzhen of the Zhenskaya Hockey League (ZhHL)
