= Manitoba Female Hockey League =

Under-18 ice hockey league in the province of Manitoba, Canada

- Sport: Ice hockey
- Founded: 2008
- First season: 2008-09
- No. of teams: 9
- Most recent champion: Winnipeg Ice (2023-24)
- Most titles: Pembina Valley Hawks (7)
- Related competitions: Esso Cup

The Manitoba Female Hockey League (MFHL) is an under-18 ice hockey league in the province of Manitoba, Canada. It is designated as an 'AAA' league – the highest level of minor hockey in Canada – and operates under the supervision of Hockey Manitoba.

== History ==
The league was founded in 2008 to provide elite female hockey players in Manitoba with the opportunity to play at a more competitive level. A number of players who have played in the league have joined NCAA or CIS hockey programs. The league was built using the same model used by Hockey Manitoba for the Manitoba Midget 'AAA' Hockey League, which has been operating quite successfully since the 1980s. Manitoba was the last western province to have a female under-18 'AAA' league.

== Teams ==
The league began its inaugural season with five teams, and now has nine. All teams are regionally based and are operated by Hockey Manitoba's regional minor hockey associations. Each team is composed of players from local minor hockey associations within its region.

Team	Region	League Titles	National Titles
Brandon Wheat Kings	Brandon	0	0
Central Plains Capitals	Central Plains	1	0
Eastman Selects	Eastman	1	0
Interlake Lightning	Interlake	0	0
Pembina Valley Hawks	Pembina Valley	7	1
Westman Wildcats	Westman South	2	1
Winnipeg Avros	Winnipeg	0	0
Winnipeg Ice	Winnipeg	2	0
Yellowhead Chiefs	Yellowhead	1	0

=== Former Teams ===
- Parkland Panthers
- Norman Wild

== Home Arenas ==
Team	Arena	City/Town
Brandon Wheat Kings	J&G Homes Arena	Brandon
Central Plains Capitals	BDO Centre for the Community	Portage la Prairie
Eastman Selects	Niverville Community Resource and Recreation Centre	Niverville
Interlake Lightning	Veterans Memorial Complex	Stonewall
Pembina Valley Hawks	Access Event Centre	Morden
Westman Wildcats	Hartney Community Rink	Hartney
Winnipeg Avros	Seven Oaks Arena	Winnipeg
Winnipeg Ice	Hockey For All Centre	Winnipeg
Yellowhead Chiefs	Shoal Lake Communiplex	Shoal Lake

== Championship ==
Since the 2011–12 season, the league championship has doubled as the provincial female under-18 AAA championship. Each year, the Manitoba champion competes in an inter-provincial playoff series against the champion from Saskatchewan. The winner of that series earns a berth in the Esso Cup, the national female under-18 championship.

The Pembina Valley Hawks were national champions in 2012, while the Westman Wildcats won the inaugural Esso Cup in 2009, prior to joining the league. Pembina Valley hosted the 2017 Esso Cup in Morden.

=== League Champions ===
- 2023-24 Winnipeg Ice
- 2022-23 Winnipeg Ice
- 2021-22 Westman Wildcats
- 2020-21 No Champion (COVID-19)
- 2019-20 Winnipeg Ice/Winnipeg Avros (tie due to COVID-19)
- 2018-19 Westman Wildcats
- 2017-18 Eastman Selects
- 2016-17 Pembina Valley Hawks (Westman Wildcats advanced to regional playoff)
- 2015-16 Yellowhead Chiefs
- 2014-15 Central Plains Capitals
- 2013-14 Pembina Valley Hawks
- 2012-13 Pembina Valley Hawks
- 2011-12 Pembina Valley Hawks National Champions
- 2010-11 Pembina Valley Hawks
- 2009-10 Pembina Valley Hawks
- 2008-09 Pembina Valley Hawks

== League Awards ==
=== Most Valuable Player ===
- 2023-24: Stephanie Jacob (F, Winnipeg Ice)
- 2022-23: Grace Glover (G, Westman Wildcats)
- 2021-22: Norah Collins (F, Winnipeg Avros)
- 2020-21: N/A (COVID-19)
- 2019-20: Kylie Lesuk (F, Eastman Selects)
- 2018-19: Taylor Coward (F, Winnipeg Avros)
- 2017-18: Halle Oswald (G, Pembina Valley Hawks)
- 2016-17: Ashton Bell (F, Westman Wildcats)
- 2015-16: Ashton Bell (F, Westman Wildcats)
- 2014-15: Jaycee Magwood (F, Westman Wildcats)
- 2013-14: Jaycee Magwood (F, Westman Wildcats)
- 2012-13: Ashley Brykaliuk (F, Westman WIldcats)
- 2011-12: Madison Hutchinson (D, Pembina Valley Hawks)

== See also ==
- Hockey Manitoba
- Manitoba U-18 'AAA' Hockey League
- Esso Cup
