= Saskatchewan Female U18 AAA Hockey League =

- Formerly: Saskatchewan Female Midget AAA Hockey League
- Sport: Ice hockey
- Founded: 2006
- First season: 2006-07
- No. of teams: 8
- Most recent champion: Saskatoon Stars (2019)
- Most titles: Notre Dame Hounds (5)
- Related competitions: Esso Cup
- Website: SFU18AAAHL.com

The Saskatchewan Female U18 AAA Hockey League (SFU18AAAHL), formerly the Saskatchewan Female Midget AAA Hockey League (SFMAAAHL), is a U-18 ice hockey league in the province of Saskatchewan, Canada. The league operates under the supervision of the Hockey Saskatchewan and is the highest level of female minor hockey in the province.

== History ==
The league was founded in 2006 by the SHA to provide an opportunity for female hockey players to play at a more competitive level and assist them in pursuing their hockey futures. Many SFMAAAHL players who have gone on to play in top-level Canadian Interuniversity Sport or NCAA hockey programs.

== Teams ==
Team	City	League Titles	National Titles
Battleford Sharks	Battleford	0	0
Melville Prairie Fire	Melville	0	0
Notre Dame Hounds	Wilcox	5	1
Prince Albert Bears	Prince Albert	2	0
Regina Rebels	Regina	1	0
Saskatoon Stars	Saskatoon	4	0
Swift Current Wildcats	Swift Current	0	0
Weyburn Gold Wings	Weyburn	1	1

== Championship ==
The winner of each season's playoffs is awarded the Fedoruk Cup as provincial Female Midget AAA champions. The champion goes on to play a best-of-three series against the champion from Manitoba, the winner of which qualifies for the Esso Cup national championship. The Notre Dame Hounds and Webyurn Gold Wings are the only two Saskatchewan teams to win the Esso Cup. The Hounds were runners-up in 2010.

=== League Champions ===
- 2006-07 Notre Dame
- 2007-08 Notre Dame
- 2008-09 Prince Albert
- 2009-10 Notre Dame
- 2010-11 Notre Dame National Champions
- 2011-12 Notre Dame
- 2012-13 Regina
- 2013-14 Weyburn National Champions
- 2014-15 Saskatoon
- 2015-16 Saskatoon
- 2016-17 Prince Albert
- 2017-18 Saskatoon
- 2018-19 Saskatoon
- 2019-20 cancelled
