= Ontario Women's Hockey Association =

- Founded: 1975; 51 years ago
- Founder: Cookie Cartwright
- Type: Sports governing body
- Purpose: Organize and promote women's ice hockey in Ontario, Canada
- Headquarters: 225 Watline Avenue; Mississauga, Ontario
- Location: Canada
- Field: Ice hockey
- Members: 51,395 registered (2020)
- Official language: English
- Website: OWHA.on.ca

The Ontario Women's Hockey Association (OWHA) is the governing body of women's ice hockey in the Province of Ontario, Canada. The OWHA is a member of the Ontario Hockey Federation (OHF), the Ontario branch of Hockey Canada. The Association was formed in 1975 by Cookie Cartwright to generate interest in women's ice hockey. Roughly ten years later, Fran Rider became the association's executive director.

In 1976, Rhonda Leeman Taylor took on a volunteer position with the OWHA and helped the Association grow the number of registered female teams from 101 to 203, within three years. She became the first employee hired by Hockey Ontario to assist in the development of the OWHA, then in 1980 became its first salaried female employee.

== Jurisdiction ==
The OWHA operates independently from the OHF's other member associations that govern the various levels of men's hockey. It governs all levels of women's hockey in the province, including minor, junior, and senior, at a provincial level.

== Leagues ==
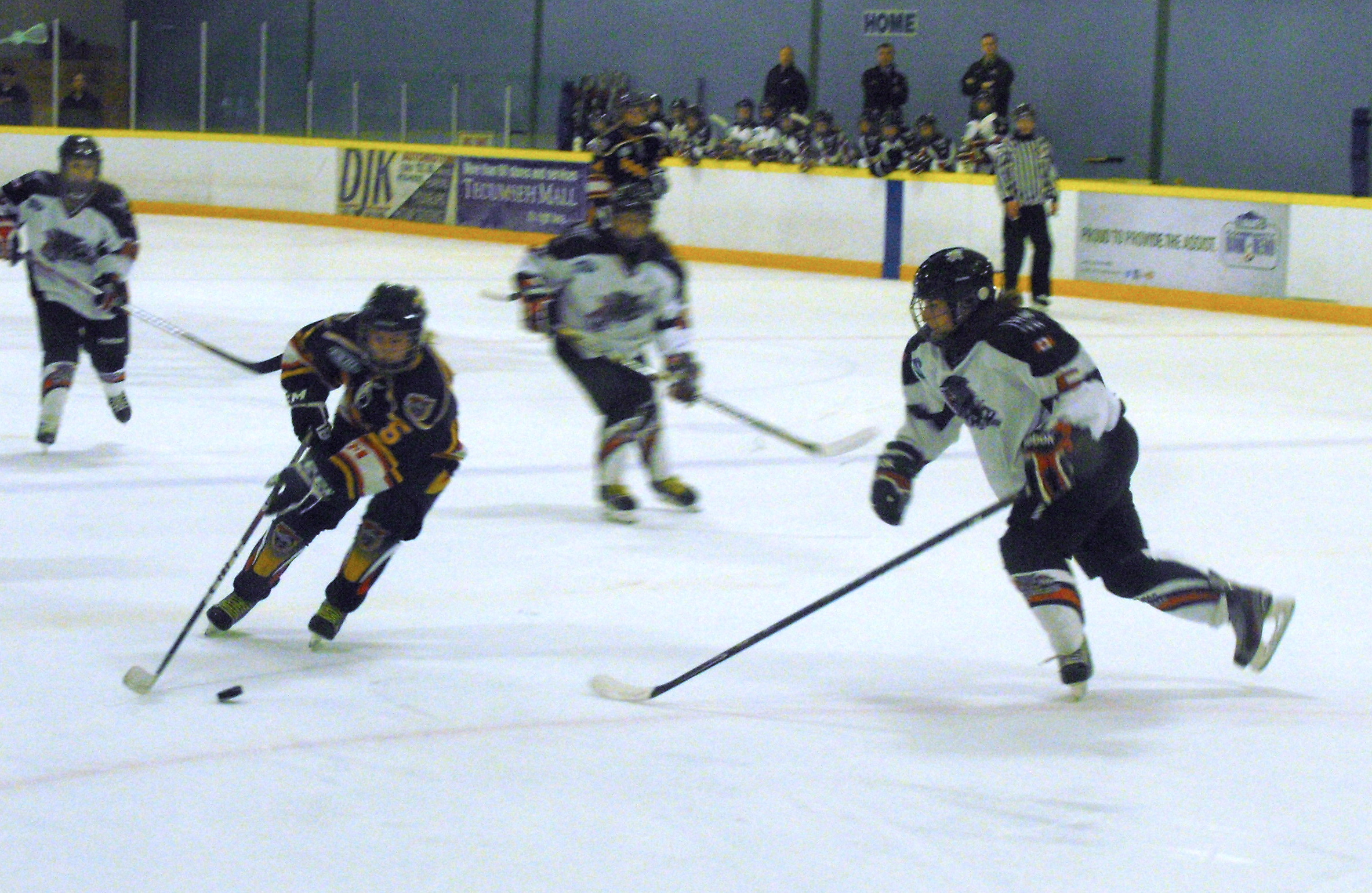
Southwest and Barrie battle during 2013-14 PWHL season.

Senior

- Golden Blades Junior Hockey League
- Lower Lakes Female Hockey League (LLFHL)
- Windsor Essex Women's Hockey League

Intermediate AA/Junior

- Ontario Women's Hockey League (OWHL) - founded in 2004 as the Provincial Women's Hockey League

Minor

- Lower Lakes Female Hockey League (LLFHL)
- Western Ontario Athletic Association

Associated Groups

- Ottawa District Women's Hockey Association
- Thunder Bay Women's Hockey Association
- Western Ontario Athletic Association

== OWHA Provincial Champions (Senior AAA) ==
Season	Ontario Winners	Runners-up	Third place	Women's National Championships	Ontario result at Nationals
1981-82	Agincourt Canadians			Brantford, Ontario	Agincourt won the 1982 Abby Hoffman Cup
1982-83	Burlington Ladies			Brantford, Ontario	Burlington won the 1983 Abby Hoffman Cup
1983-84	Hamilton Golden Hawks			Spruce Grove, Alberta	Hamilton won bronze
1984-85	Hamilton Golden Hawks			Summerside, Prince Edward Island	Hamilton won silver
1985-86	Hamilton Golden Hawks			North Battleford, Saskatchewan	Hamilton won the 1986 Abby Hoffman Cup
1986-87	Hamilton Golden Hawks			Riverview, New Brunswick	Hamilton won the 1987 Abby Hoffman Cup
1987-88	Hamilton Golden Hawks			Burlington, Ontario	Hamilton won bronze
1988-89	North York Aeros			Coquitlam, British Columbia	North York won silver
1989-90	North York Aeros			Lloydminster, Saskatchewan	North York won bronze
1990-91	North York Aeros			Verdun, Quebec	North York won the 1991 Abby Hoffman Cup
1991-92	North York Aeros			Edmonton, Alberta	North York won silver
1992-93	North York Aeros			Ottawa, Ontario	North York won the 1993 Abby Hoffman Cup
1993-94	North York Aeros			Winnipeg, Manitoba	North York won bronze
1994-95	Mississauga Chiefs			Summerside, Prince Edward Island	Mississauga finished in fourth place
1995-96	North York Aeros			Moncton, New Brunswick	North York won silver
1996-97	North York Aeros			Richmond, British Columbia	North York won bronze
1997-98	North York Aeros			Calgary, Alberta	North York won silver
1998-99	North York Aeros			Mississauga, Ontario	North York won bronze
1999-2000	North York Aeros			Sydney, Nova Scotia	North York won the 2000 Abby Hoffman Cup
2000-01	North York Aeros	Brampton Thunder	Durham Lightning	Summerside, Prince Edward Island	North York won bronze
2001-02	North York Aeros	Brampton Thunder	Mississauga Ice Bears	Arnprior, Ontario and Renfrew, Ontario	North York won silver Brampton won bronze
2002-03	Brampton Thunder	North York Aeros	Mississauga Ice Bears	Saskatoon, Saskatchewan	Brampton won silver
2003-04	Toronto Aeros	Oakville Ice	Durham Lightning	Sherwood Park, Alberta	Toronto won the 2004 Abby Hoffman Cup
2004-05	Brampton Thunder	Toronto Aeros	Oakville Ice	Sarnia, Ontario	Toronto won the 2005 Abby Hoffman Cup; Brampton won silver
2005-06	Brampton Thunder	Oakville Ice	Ottawa Raiders	Sydney, Nova Scotia	Brampton won the 2006 Abby Hoffman Cup
2006-07	Mississauga Aeros	Etobicoke Dolphins	Oakville Ice	Salmon Arm, British Columbia	Etobicoke won silver Mississauga won bronze
2007-08	Brampton Canadette-Thunder	Mississauga Chiefs	Burlington Barracudas	Charlottetown, Prince Edward Island	Mississauga won the 2008 Abby Hoffman Cup; Brampton won silver
