= Lakehead Junior Hockey League =

Junior ice hockey league in Canada

- Federation: Hockey Northwestern Ontario
- President: Ron Whitehead
- Vice President: Josh Gribben
- Former name: Thunder Bay Junior B/Juvenile/AAA Hockey League
- Founded: 1993
- No. of teams: 5
- Recent champions: Current River Storm (2025)
- Most successful club: Thunder Bay Northern Hawks 12
- Website: https://www.theljhl.com/

The Lakehead Junior Hockey League (LJHL) is a Canadian Junior ice hockey league in Northwestern Ontario, sanctioned by Hockey Northwestern Ontario and Hockey Canada. An earlier edition of this league existed in the 1970s.

The Thunder Bay-based league has produced three Keystone Cup Western Canada Junior "B" champion and six Brewers Cup Western Canada Junior "C" champions.

== History ==
Formerly referred to as the Thunder Bay Junior B/Juvenile/AAA Hockey League, the LJHL league has, in the past, mixed itself with Juvenile and Midget "AAA" teams in the Thunder Bay region for regular season games. In those seasons, only the Junior teams are eligible for the playoffs. The league playoff champions earn the right to compete for the Keystone Cup, the Western Canadian Junior "B" championship. Hockey Canada does not offer a Junior "B" National championship therefore regional (Southern Ontario-Sutherland Cup, Ottawa District-Carson Trophy, Quebec-Coupe Dodge, Atlantic Canada-Don Johnson Memorial Cup) winners lay claim as top teams at the level.

From 1996 until 2004, the TBJBHL competed against the North of Superior Junior B Hockey League in the William Ryan Trophy (Hockey Northwestern Ontario regionals) for the right to compete at the Keystone Cup. After the 2003–04 season, the NSHL folded with their last champion, the Wawa Travellers, losing their final game at the regional to the TBJBHL's Thunder Bay Northern Hawks.

=== 1993–94 Hurricanes ===
The Fort William Hurricanes did not manage to win the league championship in its first season, but it won the league's first National medal. The Westfort Maroons won the league championship while the Hurricanes played host to the Keystone Cup. The Hurricanes finished the round robin with a 3–1–1 record, losing a tiebreaker for second place to the Kinistino Tigers (North Saskatchewan Junior B Hockey League) due to a head-to-head 4-1 loss. The Hurricanes defeated the North Okanagan Kings of the Kootenay International Junior Hockey League 8-7 to win the Keystone Cup Bronze medal game.

=== 1998–99 Hurricanes ===
At the Northern Ontario regionals, the Fort William Hurricanes were dropped by the Hearst Elans of the North of Superior Junior B Hockey League. The Herks hosted the 1999 Keystone Cup regardless of regional qualifying. The Hurricanes finished the Keystone Cup round robin in a three-way tie for second place and a berth into the gold medal game with the Vancouver Island Junior Hockey League's Campbell River Storm and the South Saskatchewan Junior B Hockey League's Assiniboia Southern Rebels. During the robin, the Herks defeated Assiniboia 7–5 and Campbell River 6–4, thus winning the tie breaker. In the final they met the Edmonton Royals of the Capital Junior Hockey League and defeated them 5–3 to win the Keystone Cup. This championship marked the first Western Canada Jr. B championship since the league's inception in 1993.

=== 2003–04 Northern Hawks ===
In the 2003–04 season, the Thunder Bay Northern Hawks were a dominant champion, sporting a 22–0–2 perfect record and a Thunder Bay Junior B championship. In the Northern Ontario Regional Junior B Hockey Championship, the Northern Hawks defeated the Wawa Travellers four-games-straight to advance to the Keystone Cup tournament in Schreiber, Ontario. At the Keystone Cup, the Northern Hawks finished with 2 wins, 1 loss, and 2 ties, which earned them a spot in the tournament's bronze medal game. The Hawks fell in the Bronze Medal Game 7–5 to the Heritage Junior B Hockey League's Red Deer Vipers.

=== 2008–09 Wolverines ===
The K&A Wolverines were awarded the right to host the 2009 Keystone Cup. For the first time in over ten years, a Thunder Bay Junior B team finished the Keystone Cup round robin with a perfect record. The Wolverines (5–0) went into the final against the Pacific International Junior Hockey League's Richmond Sockeyes, but fell 6–5 in double overtime to take the Silver Medal. The finish was the best performance by a Thunder Bay Junior B club since the 1999 Fort William Hurricanes, who won the Keystone Cup. At the end of the season, the Wolverines jumped to Junior A, joining the Superior International Junior Hockey League.

=== 2011–12 Northern Hawks ===
The Northern Hawks finished first in the league with a 30–2–0 record. They blasted the Schreiber Falcons 3-games-to-none in a lopsided semifinal playoff series and then defeated the Nipigon Elks 4-games-to-1 to win the Thunder Bay championship in a very hard-fought series. The Northern Hawks shipped out to Saskatoon, Saskatchewan, for the 2012 Keystone Cup. Despite leading 3–1 at one point, the Northern Hawks lost their opening game to the Abbotsford Pilots of the Pacific International Junior Hockey League, 7–4. The Northern Hawks then went on a tear, defeating the Host Saskatoon Royals 6–3, Keystone Junior Hockey League's Arborg Ice Dawgs 7–5, North West Junior Hockey League's Whitecourt Wolverines 7–4, and the Prairie Junior Hockey League's Pilot Butte Storm 3–1 to earn a berth into the gold medal game with a 4–1–0 record. After four victories in a row, the Northern Hawks fell to the Pilots in the gold medal game, 9–1. The Northern Hawks' silver medal is the league's second in four seasons after being shut out from 2000 until the Wolverines won silver in 2009.

== Teams ==
Team	Centre	Arena	Joined
Current River Storm	Thunder Bay	Current River Arena	2022
Nipigon Elks	Nipigon	Nipigon Community Ant Hill	1993
Schreiber Falcons	Schreiber	Schreiber Community Centre	2011
Thunder Bay Bandits	Thunder Bay	Thunder Bay Tournament Centre	2020
Thunder Bay Northern Hawks	Thunder Bay	Fort William Gardens	1999

=== Former teams ===
- Aguasabon River Rats (2004–05)
- First Nation Screaming Eagles (2010–11)
- Fort William Hurricanes (1993–2000)
- K&A Wolverines (2003–09) – joined Superior International Junior Hockey League; folded after 2009–10 season
- NNEC Wolfpack (2002–03)
- North End Flames Juvenile AAA (2005–08)
- Northern Renegades (2011–13)
- Northwestern Wildcats (1993–97) – joined North of Superior Junior B Hockey League; folded after 2001-02 season
- Smooth Rock Falls Thunder (2015) – ceased operations before the start of the season
- Superior Eagles AAA (2008–09)
- Thunder Bay Kings AAA (2008–11); (2015–19)
- Thunder Bay Stars (2009–17)
  - Thunder Bay Fighting Walleye (2017–20) – sold and rebranded as Thunder Bay Bandits
- Thunder Bay Wildcats (2015) – ceased operations after nine games
- Thunder Bay Wolves (2000–01) – joined Superior International Junior Hockey League
- Westfort Maroons (1993–06)

== Playoff Champions ==
Year	Champion	Finalist	Series	Central Canada Cup formerly Keystone Cup
1994	Westfort Maroons			Hurricanes – Bronze; Maroons – 5th
1995	Fort William Hurricanes			
1996	Northwestern Wildcats			
1997	Northwestern Wildcats			
1998	Fort William Hurricanes			DNQ
1999	Fort William Hurricanes			Gold
2000	Fort William Hurricanes			4th
2001	Westfort Maroons			5th
2002	Westfort Maroons			DNQ
2003	Nipigon Elks			6th
2004	Thunder Bay Northern Hawks	Westfort Maroons	4-0	4th
2005	Thunder Bay Northern Hawks	Aguasabon River Rats	3-1	6th
2006	K&A Wolverines	Thunder Bay Northern Hawks	4-3	6th
2007	K&A Wolverines	Thunder Bay Northern Hawks	4-3-1	5th
2008	K&A Wolverines	Thunder Bay Northern Hawks	4-2	6th
2009	K&A Wolverines	Thunder Bay Northern Hawks	4-0	Wolverines – Silver; Northern Hawks – 6th
2010	Thunder Bay Northern Hawks	Thunder Bay Stars	4-0	6th
2011	Thunder Bay Northern Hawks	Thunder Bay Stars	4-0	6th
2012	Thunder Bay Northern Hawks	Nipigon Elks	4-1	Silver
2013	Thunder Bay Northern Hawks	Nipigon Elks	4-0	5th
2014	Thunder Bay Northern Hawks	Thunder Bay Stars	4-1	4th of 6
2015	Thunder Bay Northern Hawks	Thunder Bay Stars	4-0	4th of 6
2016	Thunder Bay Northern Hawks	Thunder Bay Stars	4-2	6th of 6
2017	Nipigon Elks	Thunder Bay Northern Hawks	4-1	6th of 6
2018	Thunder Bay Northern Hawks	Thunder Bay Fighting Walleye	4-1	Northern Hawks – Gold; Fighting Walleye – Bronze
2019	Thunder Bay Northern Hawks	Thunder Bay Fighting Walleye	4-1	Northern Hawks – Gold; Fighting Walleye – Silver
2022	Thunder Bay Bandits	Thunder Bay Northern Hawks	4-1	Event cancelled
Year	Champion	Finalist	Series	Central Canada Cup
2023	Thunder Bay Northern Hawks	Schreiber Falcons	4-2	Schreiber Falcons – Runner up Northern Hawks – third
2024	Current River Storm	Thunder Bay Northern Hawks	4-0	Current River Storm - semifinalist
2025	Current River Storm	Schreiber Falcons	4-0	Current River Storm - semifinalist
2026	Current River Storm	Thunder Bay Northern Hawks	3-0	Current River Storm - finalist
