= Nipigon Elks =

- City: Nipigon, Ontario, Canada
- League: Lakehead Junior Hockey League
- Founded: 1993
- Home arena: Nipigon Community Centre
- Colors: Blue, Yellow, and White
- President: Irwin Nicol
- General manager: Irwin Nicol
- Head coach: John Coppock

Franchise history
- 1993-2008: Nipigon Elks
- 2008-2009: Nip-Rock Elks
- 2009-present: Nipigon Elks

The Nipigon Elks are a Canadian Junior B ice hockey team based in Nipigon, Ontario. They play in the Lakehead Junior Hockey League of Hockey Northwestern Ontario.

== History ==
The Elks are five-time Western Canadian Brewers Cup champions. They won the Junior C tournament in 1997, 1998, 2000, 2001, and 2013 against comparable teams from across Western Canada. The Elks were also 2010 finalists.

In 2008, the team changed their name from the Nipigon Elks to the Nip-Rock Elks. The name change, which was for just one season, had to do with an agreement with the neighboring town of Red Rock, Ontario.

=== 2002–03 ===
The Nipigon Elks finished off the 2002-03 season in first place with a record of 16-6-2 and went on to win the league playoffs. The Elks defeated the Wawa Travellers of the North of Superior Junior B Hockey League to win the Northern Ontario Regional Junior B Hockey Championship for the right to compete at the 2003 Keystone Cup in St. Claude, Manitoba.

The Elks first game of the Western Canadian Junior B championship was against the Assiniboia Southern Rebels, a 6-1 loss. They next played the Selkirk Fishermen, resulting in a 9-3 loss. In the third game, the Elks lost to the Spruce Grove Regals 11-2, then lost to the Richmond Sockeyes 5-1. In the fifth and final game of the round robin, the Elks lost to the host St. Claude Knights 5-1 to close out their tournament winless.

== Season-by-season standings ==
Season	GP	W	L	T	OTL	Pts	GF	GA	Results	Playoffs
2000-01	30	18	11	1	-	37	-	-	3rd	
2001-02	23	5	14	4	-	14	-	-	2nd	
2002-03	24	16	6	2	-	34	-	-	1st	Won Finals
2003-04	24	14	8	2	-	30	145	107	3rd of 7	
2004-05	24	10	11	3	-	23	106	127	4th of 7	Lost semifinals vs Northern Hawks
2005-06	30	3	25	2	-	8	92	211	6th of 7	Lost semifinals vs K&A Wolverines
2006-07	30	5	25	0	-	10	88	228	3rd of 4	Lost semifinals
2007-08	30	4	24	2	-	10	96	214	3rd of 4	Lost semifinals
2008-09	30	2	27	1	-	5	72	220	3rd of 4	Lost semifinals
2009-10	30	15	15	0	-	30	136	139	2nd of 4	Lost semifinals
2010-11	30	15	11	4	-	34	146	130	2nd of 4	Lost semifinals vs Thunder Bay Stars
2011-12	31	25	6	0	-	50	238	117	2nd of 4	Lost Finals vs Northern Hawks
2012-13	24	18	5	1	-	37	135	84	2nd of 4	Lost Finals vs Northern Hawks
2013-14	30	11	17	2	-	24	104	143	3rd of 4	Lost semifinals, 1-4 vs Thunder Bay Stars
2014-15	30	14	15	1	-	29	127	156	3rd of 4	Lost semifinals, 1-4 vs Thunder Bay Stars
2015-16	32	10	20	2	-	22	118	159	4th of 6	Lost semifinals, 1-4 vs Northern Hawks
2016-17	30	16	9	5	-	37	162	124	3rd of 5	Won semifinals, 4-1 vs Thunder Bay Stars; Won Finals, 4-1 vs Northern Hawks
2017-18	28	14	10	4	-	32	152	118	3rd of 5	Lost semifinals, 3-4 vs Northern Hawks
2018-19	30	6	21	1	2	15	102	174	4th of 5	Lost semifinals, 0-4 vs Fighting Walleye
2019-20	27	12	15	0	0	24	116	119	3rd of 4	Playoffs cancelled due to COVID-19
2020-21	2	0	2	0	0	0	116	119	---	Season cancelled due to COVID-19
2021-22	18	2	16	0	0	4	47	117	4th of 4	Lost semifinals, 2-4 vs Bandits
2022-23	24	9	14	0	1	19	83	116	4th of 5	Won 1st Round, 2-0 vs Bandits; Lost Semifinal, 0-4 Falcons
2023-24	24	2	20	0	2	6	60	183	5th of 5	Lost 1st Round, 0-2 vs Bandits
2024-25	22	2	20	0	0	2	43	155	5th of 5	Forfeit 1st Round, 0-0 vs Bandits
2025-26	24	3	19	0	2	8	81	136	5th of 5	Lost 1st Round, 0-2 vs Falcons

== Keystone Cup history ==
Western Canadian Jr. B Championships (Northern Ontario to British Columbia)
Six teams in round robin play. 1st vs 2nd for gold/silver; 3rd vs 4th for bronze.

Year	Round Robin	Record	Standing	Bronze Medal Game	Gold Medal Game
2003	L, Assiniboia 1-6; L, Selkirk 3-9; L, Spruce Grove 2-11; L, Richmond 1-5; L, St. Claude 1-5	0-5-0	6th of 6	did not qualify	did not qualify
2017	L, Regina 3-6; L, Peguis 3-4; L, Wainwright 2-9; L, Beaver Valley 2-10; L, Arborg 4-9	0-5-0	6th of 6	did not qualify	did not qualify
