= Hearst Elans =

- City: Hearst, Ontario, Canada
- League: North of Superior Junior B Hockey League
- Operated: 1997-1999
- Home arena: Claude Larose Arena

The Hearst Elans were a Canadian Junior ice hockey team from Hearst, Ontario. They played in the North of Superior Junior B Hockey League. In 1998 and 1999 they competed in the Western Canada Junior B Championships, the Keystone Cup, winning Bronze in 1998.

== History ==
The Hearst Elans joined the North of Superior Junior B Hockey League in 1997. In their first season, the Elans finished in first place and won the league's playoffs. They moved on to face the Fort William Hurricanes for the William Ryan Trophy as Northern Ontario Junior B Champions and were victorious. They moved on to the Keystone Cup, the Western Canadian Championship, in Winnipeg, Manitoba. The Elans would win the Bronze Medal Game.

In 1998-99, the Elans again finished first in the league, and again won their league's playoffs. Again, the Elans would defeat Fort William of the Thunder Bay Junior B Hockey League for the William Ryan Trophy. They moved on to the Keystone Cup again in Thunder Bay, Ontario. The Elans dropped a 4-3 decision to the Selkirk Fishermen of the Manitoba Junior B Hockey League, lost 6-4 to the Assiniboia Southern Rebels of the South Saskatchewan Junior B Hockey League, lost a 5-4 game to Fort William, and an 8-4 loss to the Capital Junior Hockey League's Edmonton Royals, before finally beating the Campbell River Storm in their final game. They finished out of the medal round.

The 1999 Keystone Cup would be the end of the Elans, as they did not return for the 1999-00 season.

== Season-by-Season Results ==
Season	GP	W	L	T	OTL	GF	GA	P	Results	Playoffs
1997-98	28	22	6	0	-	207	88	44	1st NSHL	Won League
1998-99	24	21	3	0	-	190	92	42	1st NSHL	Won League
