= Thessalon Flyers =

- City: Thessalon, Ontario
- League: Northern Ontario Junior A/ North of Superior Junior B/ International Junior B
- Operated: 1967-198x IJBHL; 1987-1990 NOJHL; 2003-2004 NSHL
- Home arena: Thessalon Community Arena
- Colours: Black, Orange, and White

Franchise history
- 1967-1972: North Shore Stars
- 1972-1973: Thessalon North Stars
- 1973-1990, 2003-2004: Thessalon Flyers

The Thessalon Flyers were a Junior "A" ice hockey team from Thessalon, Ontario, Canada. Over its history, this defunct hockey team was a part of the International Junior B Hockey League, followed by the Northern Ontario Junior Hockey League, and lastly the North of Superior Junior B Hockey League.

== History ==
The North Shore Stars joined the International Junior B Hockey League in 1967 when the Elliot Lake Vikings went on hiatus. In 1972, they changed their name to the Thessalon North Stars and a year later to the Flyers.

The Flyers played in 3 seasons in the NOJHL starting in 1987. The addition of the Flyers helped break the league from an interlocking schedule with the OHA Jr. "A" League, which otherwise would have probably fatally crippled the NOJHL.

In 1990, the Flyers folded.

In 2003-04, the Flyers came back and entered the NSHL under owner Domenic Sacco, but that season ended up being the last in NSHL history. The Flyers were good enough to make the finals, but lost out the defending champion Wawa Travellers. After the season, the Flyers and the Aguasabon River Rats left the league, leaving the Wawa Travellers and the Marathon Renegades and the league to fold. They were coached by Vic Duguay (fired before season started), Ryan Leonard (asst. coach/head coach), Roy Iachetta Sr. (asst. coach), Chad Vresk (asst. coach) and Jeff Williamson (trainer). The Flyers only ever season in the NSHL saw them led in scoring by Lucas Bedell with 48 points in 17 games played, this was good for the league lead.

With the Sault Ste. Marie Greyhounds and Soo Thunderbirds playing out of Sault Ste. Marie, Ontario, Sault business man Domenic Sacco knew that surrounding communities would jump at the chance of seeing high-calibre hockey in their hometowns on a regular basis. Thus the reintroduction of the Thessalon Flyers in the small farming community of Thessalon, Ontario. With a competitive talent pool being sought by teams such as the Thunderbirds and nearby Soo Indians and Blind River Beavers, Sacco knew that drawing a competitive team would be difficult. Offering to cover transportation costs to and from surrounding areas, players from all over the north shore of Lake Huron combined to make the 2003-2004 Thessalon Flyers. Of these players included former Great North Midget League players Lucas Bedell and Thessalon native Jason Bird. Failing to pay for ice fees in Thessalon, coupled with failed sponsorship deals, left the coffers of the team nearly empty and players left town, leaving the team not nearly as competitive as originally anticipated. Despite this setback, the Flyers went on to the NSHL final, losing four games to one to the Wawa Travellers. Players upset with the lack of team travel for the first two games of the series in Wawa sent management a message by refusing to report to practice the following week and neglected to show up for the next two games of the final series resulting in forfeiture of the title, and a hefty suspension levied on team owner and general manager Sacco by the Northern Ontario Hockey Association. The team has yet to return to Thessalon, as a league to play in no longer exists.

== Season-by-season results ==
Season	GP	W	L	T	OTL	GF	GA	P	Results	Playoffs
1967-68	24	1	23	0	-	--	--	2	5th IJBHL	DNQ
1968-69	24	3	21	0	-	--	--	6	5th IJBHL	DNQ
1969-70	29	11	13	5	-	--	--	27	4th IJBHL	Lost semi-final
1970-71	30	13	15	2	-	--	--	28	4th IJBHL	Lost semi-final
1971-72	34	5	25	4	-	--	--	14	6th IJBHL	DNQ
1972-73	34	5	27	2	-	--	--	12	6th IJBHL	DNQ
1973-74	34	6	25	3	-	--	--	15	6th IJBHL	DNQ
1974-75	33	12	18	3	-	192	325	27	6th IJBHL	DNQ
1975-87	Information Not Available									
1987-88	39	13	24	2	-	205	274	28	4th NOJHL	Lost semi-final
1988-89	41	5	33	3	-	187	332	13	5th NOJHL	DNQ
1989-90	40	13	23	4	-	201	257	30	5th NOJHL	DNQ
Flyers were dormant from 1990 until 2003
2003-04	24	9	14	-	1	114	139	19	3rd NSHL	Lost final
