= North of Superior Junior B Hockey League =

Hockey league

- Regions: Northwestern Ontario; Northeastern Ontario
- President (1996-1998): Chris Joubert
- President (1998-?): Claude Montfort
- Founded: 1996
- Folded: 2004
- No. of teams: 3-5
- Associated titles: Royal Goodyear Cup (League Championship); William Ryan Trophy (Northern Ontario Championship); Keystone Cup (Western Canadian Championship)
- Most successful club: Aguasabon River Rats (3 titles, 1 Regional); Hearst Elans (2 titles, 2 Regionals, Bronze at Keystone Cup)

The North of Superior Junior B Hockey League (NSHL) is a defunct Junior ice hockey league in Ontario, Canada, sanctioned by Hockey Canada. The league used to be a part of the Northern Ontario Hockey Association.

== History ==
The North of Superior Junior B Hockey League was the brain-child of Chris Joubert of Terrace Bay, Ontario. He served as president of the NSHL for its first two years before stepping down due to work commitments. Claude Montfort of Marathon, Ontario took over after him. The league occupied most of the same zone as the old International Junior B Hockey League.

The first season, 1996–97, the league consisted of the Aguasabon River Rats, Longlac Merchants, Marathon Renegades, and Wawa Travellers. In 1997, the Hearst Elans, who played previously under Hockey Quebec, joined the league and made an instant impact. They won both the 1998 and 1999 league championships, the 1998 and 1999 Northern Ontario Championships, and Bronze at the 1998 Keystone Cup. For reasons unknown, the Elans left the league in 1999.

The NSHL survived for 8 seasons. After their 7th season, they tried to expand to increase the competition in the small league, but the expansion was blocked by the NOHA. The league threatened to take the issue to the Ontario Hockey Federation, but nothing came of it.

The victors of the league's playoffs earned the right to compete against the Hockey Northwestern Ontario's Thunder Bay Junior B Hockey League in the Northwestern Ontario Regionals. The winner of that series used to earn the right to compete for the Keystone Cup, the Western Canadian championship.

In 2004, the NSHL took a leave of absence from the NOHA. The Wawa Travellers were the only healthy team that still wanted to compete in the NSHL. The Marathon Renegades left the league for a season to attempt to find better ways of drawing players and came back in 2005 to find there was nothing left. The Thessalon Flyers were officially defunct as their owner was thrown out of Hockey Canada for shady business practices. The last team, the Aguasabon River Rats left the league because they did not want to compete in such a small league, they left for the rival TBJBHL with an all-star contingent of NSHL players, lost their 2005 league final and never came back. With the Wawa Travellers being the only team registered to the league in 2004-05 and for the 2005-06 season, the league officially closed its doors in early 2005.

In the aftermath of the dispersal of the league in 2004, the Aguasabon River Rats took a shot at covering the distance to play in the Thunder Bay Junior "B" league. They lasted only one season, but were regular season champions. In 2006, the Marathon Renegades came back to life to play Junior "A" in the Superior International Junior Hockey League. The Wawa Travellers have attempted ever since the folding of the NSHL to enter the SIJHL, but lack a core financial sponsor.

== The teams ==
Wawa Travellers -- 2003 NSHL Champions

Team	Centre
Aguasabon River Rats	Terrace Bay
Hearst Elans	Hearst
Marathon Renegades	Marathon
Northern Wildcats	Longlac
Thessalon Flyers	Thessalon
Wawa Travellers	Wawa

== Royal Goodyear Cup Champions ==
Year	Champion	Runner Up	Final Result
1997	Marathon Renegades		Lost Regional to Northwestern
1998	Hearst Elans	Marathon Renegades	Won Bronze at Keystone Cup
1999	Hearst Elans		6th at Keystone Cup
2000	Auguasabon River Rats		Lost Regional to Fort William
2001	Auguasabon River Rats		Lost Regional to Westfort
2002	Auguasabon River Rats	Wawa Travellers	5th at Keystone Cup
2003	Wawa Travellers		Lost Regional to Nipigon
2004	Wawa Travellers	Thessalon Flyers	Lost Regional to Thunder Bay
