= Elliot Lake Vikings =

- City: Elliot Lake, Ontario
- League: Northern Ontario Junior Hockey League
- Operated: 1965–1999
- Home arena: Centennial Arena
- Colours: Yellow, red, black, and white

Franchise history
- 1965–1997: Elliot Lake Vikings
- 1997–1999: Elliot Lake Ice
- 1999–2000: Nickel Centre Barons
- 2000–2001: Blind River Barons
- 2001–present: Blind River Beavers

The Elliot Lake Vikings were a Canadian junior ice hockey team that originally began playing in the International Junior B Hockey League in 1965. In 1981, the team moved to the Tier II Junior A Northern Ontario Junior Hockey League. The team was located in Elliot Lake, Ontario, Canada.

== History ==
The Elliot Lake Vikings junior hockey team was founded and first played in the International Junior B Hockey League in 1965 under the Northern Ontario Hockey Association (NOHA) jurisdiction. The league also consisted of the Blind River Beavers, Thessalon Flyers, Sault Ste Marie Thunderbirds (1976), Sault Ste Marie (Michigan) Indians, Wawa Travellers, Chapleau Huskies, and the Marquette Americans (1977).

Peter Svela was the original catalyst for starting the Elliot Lake Vikings. The team was fairly competitive until 1970 under the coaching of Barry Johnston, at a time when from 1966 to 1971 the dominant teams in the league were the Chapleau Huskies, the Blind River Beavers, and the Soo Michigan Indians. From 1971 to 1973, the team was poorly managed, was not competitive, and was on the verge of bankruptcy. The original charter for the team was set up as a non-profit organization and relied on various fundraising activities to meet its financial requirements.

Prior to the 1974 season, a new executive was elected, holding over several of the previous board of directors members, and John Berthelot Sr. was appointed as the new president and head coach. Through the generosity and assistance of two of the major creditors of the club, and with the work of the executive, the team started rebuilding the club's finances. In 1974 the club had great difficulties in acquiring not just enough talented players, but often weren't even able to ice a full roster for games. During this time, the Blind River Beavers, the Soo Thunderbirds and the Soo Michigan Indians were the dominant teams.

Starting in 1975, both Rio Algom Mines and Denison Mines assisted the club by way of sponsorship, but more importantly they agreed and enabled the team to properly recruit talent. A decision which proved to be controversial at the time, made by Mr. Berthelot and the executive of the club, was to stop the practice of bringing under-age players up from the Elliot Lake Minor Hockey System until they were of proper age to play Junior hockey. Many players came up to the Vikings back then at the age of 14 and 15. Some of these players were very talented and their personal hockey careers may have gone further had they been given the opportunity to hone their skills within their appropriate age groups, rather than having been thrust into playing against 20-year-olds before they were ready.

By 1976 the Vikings were a competitive team, ranking in the upper tier of teams in the league and eventually lost a dramatic overtime loss in the final game of the League semi-finals against the Thessalon Flyers who would eventually lose out to the Soo Thunderbirds in the finals.

During the rebuilding of the team's finances and competitiveness, another important footnote in Canadian Amateur Hockey history occurred. With the poor on ice performance and finances of the club there were few volunteers during the rebuilding years. In 1974, Mrs. Arlene Berthelot became the first woman to hold the position of manager (later to be referred to as a general manager) of a junior hockey club in Canada. She signed the NOHA card and acted as the manager, trainer (later joining Hockey Ontario in the Hockey Trainers Certification Program as one of the first Certified Hockey Trainers in the NOHA in 1979), team mother, and any did all other tasks as required to help the team succeed.

In 1979 a new executive was elected, with Gord Ouimet becoming the team's president.

From 1976 until the team joined the Northern Ontario Junior Hockey League (NOJHL) in 1981, the team never finished lower than 3rd place in the league standings. During this time the team played in front of the largest crowds in the league. In their inaugural season in the NOJHL, the Vikings lost in the league finals to the Onaping Falls Huskies.

The 1982–83 season proved to be the Vikings' most successful season ever, finishing second in the league standings, winning the NOJHL championship. They became the first NOJHL team to ever win a game against an Ontario Provincial Junior A Hockey League team, beating the North York Rangers in Guelph, Ontario, where the game was played due to arena scheduling conflicts with the Rangers home rink and later in Elliot Lake in front of crowds so big that the fire marshal was limiting fans to the building due to the size of the crowds.

The Vikings did lose the series 3-games-to-2 to the Rangers. The team was made up of talent that had been developed in the local Elliot Lake organizations with one exception. The Vikings did so with players who benefited from Mr. Berthelot's controversial decision from 1975 as referenced above. Included on the roster in the late 1980’s were Matthew Alpajaro, Robin Tessier, and Dean Bowles, three certified beauties. The one exception and only import player on the team was a highly skilled defenceman named Shannon Hope, who was acquired in a trade late in the season from the Capreol Hawks.

The Vikings survived from 1981 through to 1997, and were renamed the Ice in the summer of 1997. Their stretch in the league started off promising. They won the league in their second year and 6 of their first 9 seasons had above .500 records. In the 1982–83 season, the Vikings, as NOJHL Champions, took on the Ontario Provincial Junior A Hockey League Champions, the North York Rangers, for the Ontario Hockey Association championship and the right to play the Thunder Bay Flyers for the Dudley Hewitt Cup. Elliot Lake lost the series 3-games-to-2. When the team was at its peak in the 1980s, fans either packed Centennial Arena or listened to Bobby Alexander calling the game on CKNR radio.

Seemingly in 1990–91, the floor fell out from beneath them when the mines shut down. They would not see another winning season until 1998–99, their last season in the league. A low point in the team's history was the 1991–92 season. The team only had one victory in 48 games and averaged a 14.75 goals against per game.

Players who have played for the organization include Pittsburgh Penguins prospect Chris Thorburn. Past greats include Doug McEwen who went on to become the all-time leading scorer for the Cardiff Devils in the British Hockey League and Shannon Hope who also had a lengthy career with Cardiff.

For the 1997–98 season, the Vikings were renamed the Ice. In 1999 the team's owner, Ian Mills, abruptly left the city and moved the franchise to Nickel Centre, where the franchise became the Nickel Centre Barons. After a year in Nickel Centre, they moved to Blind River as the Blind River Barons. They were renamed the Beavers for the 2001–02 NOJHL season.

== Season-by-season results ==
Season	GP	W	L	T	OTL	GF	GA	P	Results	Playoffs
1965-66	23	6	17	0	-	--	--	12	4th IJBHL	Lost final
1966-67	22	1	21	0	-	--	--	2	5th IJBHL	Folded
1967-69	Did not participate									
1969-70	28	5	22	1	-	--	--	11	6th IJBHL	DNQ
1970-71	30	12	18	0	-	--	--	24	6th IJBHL	DNQ
1971-72	35	15	19	1	-	--	--	31	3rd IJBHL	Lost semi-final
1972-73	34	14	18	2	-	--	--	30	4th IJBHL	Lost semi-final
1973-74	34	17	16	1	-	--	--	35	3rd IJBHL	Lost semi-final
1974-75	34	3	28	3	-	116	278	9	6th IJBHL	DNQ
1975-81	IJBHL Statistics Missing									
1981-82	42	24	13	5	-	281	205	53	2nd NOJHL	
1982-83	42	26	10	6	-	272	184	58	2nd NOJHL	Won league
1983-84	40	25	11	4	-	359	223	54	2nd NOJHL	
1984-85	40	12	26	2	-	199	293	26	5th NOJHL	
1985-86	41	18	20	3	-	287	257	39	4th NOJHL	
1986-87	37	11	23	3	-	211	255	25	3rd NOJHL	
1987-88	40	22	14	4	-	227	219	48	2nd NOJHL	Lost final
1988-89	40	25	10	5	-	274	202	55	3rd NOJHL	
1989-90	40	19	17	4	-	259	242	42	3rd NOJHL	
1990-91	40	10	30	0	-	161	330	20	5th NOJHL	
1991-92	48	1	47	0	-	122	708	2	7th NOJHL	
1992-93	48	5	43	0	-	178	471	10	7th NOJHL	
1993-94	40	6	33	1	-	133	331	13	6th NOJHL	
1994-95	48	13	30	5	-	202	306	31	6th NOJHL	
1995-96	44	4	37	3	-	143	299	11	6th NOJHL	
1996-97	40	6	33	1	-	125	223	13	5th NOJHL	
1997-98	40	5	34	1	-	133	290	11	5th NOJHL	
1998-99	40	21	17	2	-	156	130	44	3rd NOJHL	

== Player league records ==
Most Shorthanded Goals, One Game: 3 - Denis Castonguay, Rayside Balfour, 1983–84 3 - Rob Demers, Elliot Lake, 1983–84

Fastest Goal, Start of a Game: 6 sec. - Michael Gingras, Rayside Balfour, 1980–81 6 sec. - Rob Lebedick, Elliot Lake, 1989–90

Fastest Goal, Start of Second Period: 5 sec. - Paul Berthelot, Elliot Lake, 1990–91

Most Power Play Goals, One Season: 28 - Shawn Dubois, Elliot Lake, 1988–89 28 - Steve Sullivan, Timmins, 1991–92

Most Hat-tricks, One Season: 15 - Shawn Dubois, Elliot Lake, 1988–89

Most Penalty Minutes, Career: 919 - Dean Bowles, Elliot Lake, 1986–91

(Source: http://www.nojhl.com)

== Team Records (League) ==
Most Goals Against Allowed, One Season: 708 - Elliot Lake, 1991–92

Most Power Play Goals Against, One Season: 136 - Haileybury, 1989–90 136 - Elliot Lake, 1991–92

Most Shorthanded Goals Against, One Season: 23 - Elliot Lake, 1990–91

(Source: http://www.nojhl.com)

== NHL alumni ==
- Jeremy Stevenson (Anaheim Ducks, Nashville Predators, Minnesota Wild, Dallas Stars)
- Chris Thorburn (Buffalo Sabres, Pittsburgh Penguins, Atlanta Thrashers)

== Coaches ==
- Barry Johnston
- Bob Whitehead
- John Berthelot Sr.
- Norm Moore
- Al Hammerlick
- Mark Watson
- Ed Godon
- Todd Stencill
- Gord Ouimet
- Mark Capeless
- Ian Mills
- Frank Porco
- Dave Berthelot
- Gill Saumure
- John Becanic (5-34-1)
