= Aguasabon River Rats =

- City: Terrace Bay, Ontario, Canada
- League: North of Superior Junior B/ Thunder Bay Junior B
- Operated: 1996-2005
- Home arena: Terrace Bay Arena
- Colours: Red, Black, and White

The Aguasabon River Rats were a Junior "B" ice hockey team based out of Terrace Bay, Ontario. They played out of the North of Superior Junior B Hockey League (NSHL) and the Thunder Bay Junior B Hockey League.

== History ==
The Aguasabon River Rats played in every season of the NSHL's history. The River Rats always did well, but from 1999-00 until 2001-02 the River Rats were the best in the league—three straight championships. The team even earned the right to play for the Western Canadian Junior "B" title, the Keystone Cup, on two occasions. The 1999–00 season was remarkable in that not only did the team win its first ever league title, but it also completed a perfect undefeated regular season.

After the 2003–04 season, the River Rats and Thessalon Flyers chose not to pursue another season in the NSHL. They moved to the Thunder Bay Junior B Hockey League for the 2004–05 season, but then folded even though they finished first overall in the regular season. The NSHL, down to the Wawa Travellers and the Marathon Renegades, chose to fold as it could not create a competitive enough atmosphere to continue.

== Season-by-season results ==
| Season | GP | W | L | T | OTL | GF | GA | P | Results | Playoffs |
|---|---|---|---|---|---|---|---|---|---|---|
| 1996-97 | - | - | - | - | - | - | - | - | NSHL | |
| 1997-98 | 28 | 16 | 11 | 1 | - | 136 | 150 | 33 | 2nd NSHL | Lost semi-final |
| 1998-99* | 22 | 13 | 8 | 1 | - | 144 | 112 | 27 | 3rd NSHL | |
| 1999-00 | 24 | 24 | 0 | - | 0 | 231 | 80 | 48 | 1st NSHL | Won League |
| 2000-01 | 24 | 18 | 5 | - | 1 | 160 | 102 | 37 | 1st NSHL | Won League |
| 2001-02 | 24 | 19 | 5 | - | 0 | 144 | 71 | 38 | 1st NSHL | Won League |
| 2002-03 | 24 | 13 | 11 | - | 0 | 164 | 149 | 26 | 2nd NSHL | |
| 2003-04 | 24 | 18 | 5 | - | 1 | 150 | 93 | 37 | 1st NSHL | |
| 2004-05 | 24 | 15 | 8 | 1 | - | 138 | 108 | 31 | 1st TBJBHL | |

(*) There are no complete stats available for this season.
