= 1991–92 NSJHL season =

The 1991–92 NSJHL season was the 24th season for the North Saskatchewan Junior B Hockey League. Seven teams completed a 42-game season.

== League notes ==
- Overtime games ending in a tie go to a shoot out. The winner of the shoot out gets two points and the win. The loser gets the tie and one point.

== Regular season ==
=== Final standings ===
League standings	GP	W	L	T	Pts	GF	GA
y Kinistino Tigers	42	35	7	0	70	351	180
y Saskatoon Royals	42	25	16	1	51	232	215
x Saskatoon Westley	42	22	18	2	46	242	235
x Saskatoon Chiefs	42	22	20	0	44	202	211
x Hudson Bay Saints	42	16	22	4	36	193	252
x Prince Albert Generals	42	17	23	2	36	182	193
Warman Valley Crusaders	42	10	31	1	21	164	280

y=first-round bye

x=playoff berth

=== Scoring leaders ===
Note: GP = Games played; G = Goals; A = Assists; Pts = Points

Player	Team	GP	G	A	Pts
T. Morrison	Kinistino Tigers	37	37	66	103
W. Spence	Kinistino Tigers	37	51	37	88
C. Wawryk	Saskatoon Westleys	41	43	40	83
J. Hope	Kinistino Tigers	37	33	49	82
T. Cox	Saskatoon Royals	40	36	45	81
T. Neiszner	Kinistino Tigers	42	33	48	81
T. Schaab	Kinistino Tigers	41	32	41	73
D. Olynyk	Saskatoon Westleys	39	29	41	70
D. McCowan	Saskatoon Westleys	37	23	43	66
J.Duda	Kinistino Tigers	42	32	33	65

=== Top goaltenders ===
Note: Min = Minutes played; G/A = Goals against; SO = Shutouts; AVG = Goals-against average

Player	Team	Min	G/A	SO	AVG
G. Denham	Kinistino Tigers	1046	67	0	3.84
J. Swanson	Kinistino Tigers	830	55	0	3.98
C. Makowsky	Prince Albert Generals	1371	96	0	4.20
K. Kosmynka	Saskatoon Royals	1560	121	0	4.65
D. Bell	Saskatoon Chiefs	1612	126	0	4.65

== Playoffs ==
Quarter-finals
Prince Albert	3
Saskatoon Westleys	1
Saskatoon Chiefs	3
Hudson Bay	0

Semi-finals
Kinistino	4
Prince Albert	0
Saskatoon Royals	3
Saskatoon Chiefs	4

Finals
Kinistino	4
Saskatoon Chiefs	0

Quarter-finals = Best of 5

Semi-finals & finals = Best of 7

== All-Star teams ==
=== First ===
Position	Player Name	Team
Goal	David Bell	Saskatoon Chiefs
Defense	Regan Harper	Kinistino Tigers
Defense	Tom Larocque	Prince Albert Generals
Centre	Tim Cox	Saskatoon Royals
Left wing	Jason Hope	Kinistino Tigers
Right wing	Wally Spence	Kinistino Tigers

=== Second ===
Position	Player Name	Team
Goal	Jaeson Swanson	Kinistino Tigers
Defense	Bart Horsman	Kinistino Tigers
Defense	Darren Bowman	Saskatoon Royals
Centre	Jay Norrish	Saskatoon Chiefs
Left wing	Chris Wawryk	Saskatoon Westleys
Right wing	Mike Chrun	Saskatoon Royals

== Awards ==
Individual Player Awards
Award	Player	Team
Clarence Ebert Memorial Trophy (League MVP)	Tim Cox	Saskatoon Royals
Al Ure Trophy (League Scoring Title	Trevor Morrison	Kinistino Tigers
Bob King Trophy (Top Goaltenders)	Jaeson Swanson - Greg Denham	Kinistino Tigers
Syl Panchuk Memorial Trophy (Playoff MVP)	David Bell	Saskatoon Chiefs

== See also ==
- North Saskatchewan Junior Hockey League
- Kinistino Tigers
- Athol Murray Trophy
- Keystone Cup
