= Athol Murray Trophy =

Canadian ice hockey series to determine Saskatchewan Junior B championship

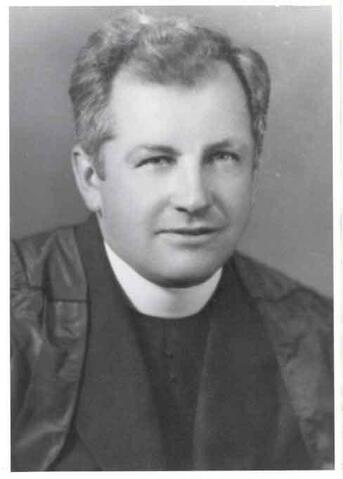
Father Athol Murray c. 1930

The Athol Murray Trophy is a Canadian ice hockey series to determine the Saskatchewan Junior B championship and seed of the Keystone Cup - the Western Canada Junior "B" Hockey Crown.

== History ==
Since the 1960s the tournament has been an important determining factor in the crowning of the Western Canadian champion. Since the Keystone Cup's inception in 1983, Saskatchewan teams have been the champion a leading 9 times. In some ways, the winning of the Saskatchewan Provincials may directly or indirectly determine the outcome of the Keystone Cup. The Championship has run every year since 1965, but the first ever Saskatchewan Junior "B" Champion seems to have been the Saskatoon Wesleys in 1951.

Throughout the 1990s and early 2000s, the North Saskatchewan Junior B Hockey League and South Saskatchewan Junior B Hockey League played off for the Murray Trophy. Since 2007 the two leagues have been merged as the Prairie Junior Hockey League.

== Champions ==
1950 Regina Maroons
1951 Saskatoon Wesleys
1952 Regina Maroons
1953 Yorkton
1954 Yorkton
1955 Lebret Indians
1956 Lebret Indians
1957 Lebret Indians
1958 Lebret Indians
1959 Lebret Indians
1962 Melville
1963 Weyburn Elks
1964 Regina Pats
1965 Saskatoon Blades
1966 North Battleford
1967 Shellbrook Knights
1968 Weyburn Red Wings
1969 Moose Jaw Canuck Bees
1970 St. Peters College Muenster (NSJHL)
1971 Saskatoon Macs (NSJHL)
1972 St. Thomas College Imperials (NSJHL)
1973 St. Thomas College Imperials (NSJHL)
1974 Saskatoon Quakers (NSJHL)
1975 Saskatoon Quakers (NSJHL)
1976 Melfort TM's (NSJHL)
1977 Melfort TM's (NSJHL)
1978 Saskatoon Quakers (NSJHL)
1979 Melfort TM's (NSJHL)
1980 Notre Dame Hounds
1981 Hudson Bay Saints (NSJHL)
1982 Saskatoon Quakers (NSJHL)
1983 Saskatoon Wesleys (NSJHL)
1984 Saskatoon Wesleys (NSJHL)
1985 Prince Albert North Stars (NSJHL)
1986 Prince Albert North Stars (NSJHL)
1987 Hudson Bay Saints (NSJHL)
1988 Warman Valley Crusaders (NSJHL)
1989 Kinistino Tigers (NSJHL)
1990 Kinistino Tigers (NSJHL)
1991 Kinistino Tigers (NSJHL)
1992 Kinistino Tigers (NSJHL)
1993 Kinistino Tigers (NSJHL)
1994 Kinistino Tigers (NSJHL)
1995 Regina Capitals (SSJHL)
1996 Assiniboia Southern Rebels (SSJHL)
1997 Grenfell Storm (SSJHL)
1998 Saskatoon Royals (NSJHL)
1999 Assiniboia Southern Rebels (SSJHL)
2000 Saskatoon Royals (SSJHL)
2001 Assiniboia Southern Rebels (SSJHL)
2002 Assiniboia Southern Rebels (SSJHL)
2003 Assiniboia Southern Rebels (SSJHL)
2004 Regina Capitals (SSJHL)
2005 Saskatoon Royals (NSJHL)
2006 Saskatoon Royals (NSJHL)
2007 Saskatoon Royals (NSJHL)
2008 Pilot Butte Storm
2009 Saskatoon Royal
2010 Tri-Town Thunder
2011 Pilot Butte Storm
2012 Pilot Butte Storm
2013 Saskatoon Royals
2014 Saskatoon Quakers
2015 Saskatoon Quakers
2016 Saskatoon Quakers
2017 Regina Capitals
2018 Regina Capitals
2019 Regina Capitals
2022 Saskatoon Quakers
2023 Pilot Butte Storm

== See also ==
- Athol Murray
