= Qu'Appelle Valley Hockey League =

Qu’Appelle Valley Highway Hockey League
- Sport: Ice hockey
- Founded: 1960
- No. of teams: 7 Senior / 9 Junior
- Country: Canada
- Most recent champions: Lumsden Monarchs (Sr); Regina River Rats (Jr) (2026)
- Website: QVHL.ca

The Qu’Appelle Valley Highway Hockey League is a C-level senior ice hockey and junior ice hockey league in the greater Regina area of Saskatchewan, Canada. It is sanctioned by Hockey Saskatchewan and Hockey Canada.

== Senior history ==
Formed in 1960, QVHL Senior teams have won Saskatchewan Provincial titles on several occasions. Among them:

- The Balcarres Broncs were the first to bring home a title as Provincial 'C' champions in 1974.
- The Grenfell Spitfires were Provincial 'B' champions in 1982.
- The Milestone Flyers were 'C' winners in 1985 and 2003. The Flyers also captured the 'D' title in 1998.
- The Standing Buffalo Bulls were 'A' winners in 2000.
- The Balgonie Bisons won the Provincial 'A' championship in 2011 and repeated the feat in 2018.
- The Lumsden Monarchs won the Provincial 'A' championship in 2026.

In 2021, the Qu’appelle Valley Hockey league merged with the Highway Hockey league to form what is now known as the Qu’appelle Valley Highway Hockey League.

== Junior history ==
Formed in 2015 after the folding of the Regina Junior C Hockey League (1996–2015) three former member teams (Balcarres Broncos, Lumsden Jaxx, Regina River Rats) joined the QVHL along with the White Butte Eagles. RJCHL hosted the annual Brewers Cup, the Junior C championship of Western Canada, from 1992–2014.

In March 2017 Bredenbury Tundra joined QVJHL for the 2017-18 season. The Tundra were confirmed as new expansion teams in April along with the Cupar Canucks, Wolseley Mustangs and Yellow Grass Wheat Kings.

The QVJHL announced two expansion teams (Emerald Park Wizards and Southey Marlins) for the 2018–19 season. Cupar Canucks folded after one season, winning just three games. Bredenbury Tundra relocated to Esterhazy, but ceased operations on December 16 after nine games.

Two new teams joined the circuit for 2020–2021 with the addition of Ochapowace Thunder and Regina Shamrocks.

The Strasbourg Maroons and Caronport joined the league for the 2024-25 season.

The Davidson Jr. Cyclones joined the league for the 2025-26 season.

== Teams ==
Senior Teams	Formed
Balcarres Broncs	1960
Balgonie Bisons	1968
Bethune Bulldogs	
Grenfell Spitfires	
Lumsden Monarchs	
Raymore Rockets	
Southey Marlins	
Junior C Teams	Formed
Caronport Aviators	2024
Davidson Jr Cyclones	2025
Emerald Park Wizards	2018
Kelliher Komets	2023
Lumsden Lumberjaxx	2007
Regina River Rats	2014
Strasbourg Maroons	2024
Wolseley Mustangs	2017
Yellow Grass Wheat Kings	2017

=== Former/inactive Sr. teams ===
- Milestone Flyers (2000-2025)
- Odessa/Vibank Bruins (2010-2023)
- Gordon’s Golden Hawks (2004–2012)
- Indian Head Chiefs (2000–2019)
- Kelliher Komets (2008–2010)
- Monmartre-Glenavon Rivals (2004–2009)
- Ogema Colts (2008–2011)
- Pilot Butte Broncos (2004–2005)
- Radville Nationals (2012–2017)
- Rouleau Ramblers (2000–2010)
- Standing Buffalo Bulls (2000–2001)
- Whitewood Orioles (2006–2018)
- Windthorst Pirates (2000–2001)
- Wolseley Winterhawks (2000–2005)

=== Former/inactive Jr. teams ===
- Balcarres Broncs (????–2017)
- Bredenbury Tundra (2017–2018)
- Cupar Canucks (2017–2018)
- Indian Head Chiefs (2006–12; 2016–2018)
- Moose Jaw Regina Shamrocks Canucks (2006–2015)
- Ochapowace Thunder (2020-2022)
- Pilot Butte Storm (????–2006) - joined Prairie Junior Hockey League
- Regina Brewers (1997–2015)
- Regina Bulldogs
- Regina Hurricanes
- Regina Mustangs
- Regina Shamrocks (2020-2022)
- Southey Marlins (1997–2015)
- White Butte Eagles (2015–2018)

== List of champions ==
=== Senior champions ===
Season	Champion	Runner up	Result	Provincial winners
1997	Monmartre-Glenavon Rivals			
1998	Balcarres Broncs			Milestone Flyers 'D'
1999	Standing Buffalo Bulls			
2000	Standing Buffalo Bulls			Standing Buffalo Bulls 'A'
2001	Standing Buffalo Bulls			
2002	Balgonie Bisons			
2003	Indian Head Chiefs			Milestone Flyers 'C'
2004	Milestone Flyers			
2005	Milestone Flyers			
2006	Milestone Flyers			
2007	Monmartre-Glenavon Rivals			
2008	Balgonie Bisons			
2009	Balgonie Bisons			
2010	Balgonie Bisons			
2011	Balgonie Bisons	Milestone Flyers	3–0	Balgonie Bisons 'A'
2012	Balgonie Bisons	Milestone Flyers	2–0	
2013	Balcarres Broncs	Balgonie Bisons	3–2	
2014	Radville Nationals	Balcarres Broncs	3–1	
2015	Radville Nationals	Grenfell Spitfires	3–2	
2016	Balgonie Bisons	Grenfell Spitfires	3–1	
2017	Grenfell Spitfires	Milestone Flyers	3–0	
2018	Grenfell Spitfires	Balgonie Bisons	3–2	Balgonie Bisons 'A'
2019	Milestone Flyers	Balgonie Bisons	3–0	
2020	none (playoffs suspended)			
2021	none (season cancelled)			
2022	Lumsden Monarchs	Balcarres Broncs	3-1	
2023	Balcarres Broncs	Grenfell Spitfires	3-2	
2024	Lumsden Monarchs	Grenfell Spitfires	3-0	
2025	Lumsden Monarchs	Raymore Rockets	3-2	
2026	Lumsden Monarchs	Grenfell Spitfires	3-0	Lumsden Monarchs ‘A’

=== Junior C champions ===
Season	RJCHL Champions	Runner-up	Result
1997	Regina Brewers		
1998	Regina Brewers		
1999	Regina Bulldogs		
2000	Regina Brewers		
2001	Regina Brewers		
2002	Southey Marlins		
2003	Odessa Eagles		
2003	Regina Brewers		
2005	Regina Brewers		
2006	Regina Hurricanes		
2007	Southey Marlins		
2008	Regina Mustangs	Regina Hurricanes	2–1
2009	Odessa Eagles		
2010	Lumsden/Bethune Lumberjax		
2011	Southey Marlins		
2012	Southey Marlins		
2013	Odessa Eagles		
2014	Moose Jaw Canucks	Regina Brewers	3–2
2015	Regina River Rats	Moose Jaw Canucks	3–1
Season	QVJHL Champions	Runner-up	Result
2016	Regina River Rats	White Butte Eagles	3–0
2017	Regina River Rats	Lumsden Jaxx	3–2
2018	Wolseley Mustangs	Regina River Rats	3–2
2019	Wolseley Mustangs	Yellow Grass Wheat Kings	3–0
2020	None (playoffs suspended)	—	—
2021	None (season suspended – COVID-19)	—	—
2022	Yellow Grass Wheat Kings	Wolseley Mustangs	3–1
2023	Yellow Grass Wheat Kings	Wolseley Mustangs	3–1
2024	Yellow Grass Wheat Kings	Emerald Park Wizards	3–0
2025	Wolseley Mustangs	Yellow Grass Wheat Kings	3–0
2026	Regina River Rats	Emerald Park Wizards	3–1

== See also ==
- List of ice hockey leagues
- Sport in Saskatchewan § Team sports
