= North Saskatchewan Junior Hockey League =

North Saskatchewan Junior Hockey League could mean:

- The North Saskatchewan Junior Hockey League (1948 to 1950), which became the Saskatchewan Junior Hockey League (1948–1966)
- The North Saskatchewan Junior B Hockey League, a junior ice hockey league formed in 1966
