= International Junior B Hockey League =

Defunct Canadian junior ice hockey league

The International Junior B Hockey League (IJBHL) was a Canadian Junior ice hockey league in the Northern Ontario and Northern Michigan regions. The league was controlled by the Northern Ontario Hockey Association and the Canadian Amateur Hockey Association and was founded in 1965 and lasted until 1981.

== History ==
The International Junior B Hockey League was created in 1965 to fill the gap in the region between the Northern Ontario Junior Hockey Association and the Thunder Bay Junior A Hockey League. The league encompassed the Greater-Sault Ste. Marie region to the West in Wawa plus the edge of Northern Michigan. John Reynolds was league commissioner in the early years.

The league became very significant after the NOJHA folded in 1972 and competed against the NOHA Jr. B Hockey League and the Northwestern Ontario Junior Hockey League for Northern Ontario hockey supremacy.

In 1972, the Memorial Cup-eligible NOJHA folded. The league's top two teams, the Sudbury Wolves and Sault Ste. Marie Greyhounds, moved to the Ontario Major Junior Hockey League and the North Bay Trappers moved to the newly formed Ontario Provincial Junior A Hockey League. This left the Chelmsford Canadiens and dozens of junior-capable players without a league. This caused the expansion of the infantile NOHA Jr. B Hockey League who took the IJBHL to task in their first three years to win three straight NOHA titles from the IJBHL. In 1973, the Coniston Cubs defeated the Soo Indians, in 1974 the Rayside Balfour Canadians defeated the Wawa Travellers, and in 1975 the Onaping Falls Flyers defeated the Blind River Beavers.

In 1978, the NOHA Junior B Hockey League was promoted to Junior A and became the Northern Ontario Junior Hockey League.

== Teams ==
Team	Centre	Joined	Departed
Blind River Beavers	Blind River, ON	1971
Chapleau Huskies	Chapleau, ON	1966
Elliot Lake Vikings	Elliot Lake, ON	1965	1981
Marquette Americans	Marquette, MI
Sault Thunderbirds	Sault Ste. Marie, ON	1978	1981
Soo Indians	Sault Ste. Marie, MI	1965
Soo Rapids	Sault Ste. Marie, ON	1965	1971
Thessalon Flyers	Thessalon, ON	1967
Wawa Travellers	Wawa, ON	1965

== Marty Pavelich Trophy Playoff Champions ==
Year	Champion	Runner-Up	Provincials
1966	Soo Rapids	Elliot Lake Vikings	None
1967	Chapleau Huskies	Soo Indians	None
1968	Wawa Travellers	Soo Indians	Won NOHA, Lost NO-OD Series to Ottawa
1969	Soo Indians	Soo Rapids	Won NOHA vs. Sudbury
1970	Soo Indians	Soo Rapids	Lost NO-OD Series to Ottawa
1971	Wawa Travellers	Chapleau Huskies	Won NOHA vs. Sudbury
1972	Soo Indians	Chapleau Huskies	Won NOHA, Lost NO-TB to Schreiber
1973	Soo Indians	Chapleau Huskies	Lost NOHA to Coniston
1974	Wawa Travellers	Chapleau Huskies	Lost NOHA to Rayside-Balfour
1975	Blind River Beavers	Soo Indians	Lost NOHA to Onaping Falls
1976	Wawa Travellers	Blind River Beavers	Lost NOHA to Onaping Falls
1977	Soo Indians	Wawa Travellers	Won NOHA vs. Onaping Falls
1978	Soo Indians	Thessalon Flyers	Lost NOHA to Onaping Falls
1979
1980
1981
