= Ontario Minor Hockey Association =

Ice hockey governing body in Ontario, Canada

- Sport: Ice hockey
- Abbreviation: OMHA
- Founded: November 30, 1940
- Headquarters: Richmond Hill, Ontario
- Replaced: Ontario Juvenile Hockey Association (OJHA), Ontario Midget and Bantam Hockey Association (OMBHA)
- (founded): November 20, 1916

Official website
- www.omha.net

The Ontario Minor Hockey Association (OMHA) is a minor ice hockey governing body in Ontario. The OMHA is sanctioned by the Ontario Hockey Federation and Hockey Canada.

== History ==
The OMHA was founded on November 30, 1940, after a merger of the Ontario Juvenile Hockey Association and the Ontario Midget and Bantam Hockey Association, arranged by Jack Roxburgh. The new league began its first season with eight teams, and signed an affiliation agreement with the Ontario Hockey Association (OHA).

During the summer in 1989, the Metro Toronto Hockey League (MTHL) and the OMHA, broke away from the OHA and formed the Central Canada Hockey Association, due to disagreement with an OHA restructuring proposal which would have limited their voting powers. The dispute ended when the Ontario Hockey Federation (OHF) was established, with equal representation for the OHA, Northern Ontario Hockey Association, MTHL, and OMHA. The OHF was given the mandate to oversee hockey in Ontario, and be a review panel for three years to propose further restructuring if necessary.

== AAA ice hockey ==
AAA-level minor ice hockey in Ontario includes divisions from ages under-10 to under-18 arranged into two leagues; OMHA AAA East and OMHA AAA West. The two league were formerly known as the Eastern AAA Hockey League and the South Central AAA Hockey League, until rebranding in 2023. Following the conclusion of the 2023-24 season, the Buffalo Regals, the only American organization in the league, withdrew from the OMHA.

Teams in the under-10 to under-18 age groups play between 30 and 36 regular-season games against other teams within the league. Following the regular season, AAA employs a round-robin tournament playoff format for each division to determine with teams advance to the OMHA Championships. At the championship tournament, Western and Eastern conference compete against each other. The top two teams from Group A and B advance to the OMHA Championships, with seeding based on regular-season standings. The OMHA champions proceed to the Ontario/Central Region Championship hosted between the OHF, Hockey Northwestern Ontario, and Hockey Eastern Ontario, where applicable for the age group.

== Rules ==
All OMHA games follow the standard Hockey Canada rulebook, as well as regulations set by the OHF. The OMHA enforces its own Minimum Suspension List, which differs slightly from OHF policies by implementing a more stringent progressive discipline system. Additionally, the league follows the no-change-on-icing rule at the U18 AAA level.
