= Jeremy Stevenson =

American ice hockey player (born 1974)

- Born: July 28, 1974 (age 51) San Bernardino, California, U.S.
- Height: 6 ft 1 in (185 cm)
- Weight: 215 lb (98 kg; 15 st 5 lb)
- Position: Left wing
- Shot: Left
- Played for: Mighty Ducks of Anaheim; Nashville Predators; Minnesota Wild; Dallas Stars
- NHL draft: 60th overall, 1992; Winnipeg Jets; 262nd overall, 1994; Mighty Ducks of Anaheim
- Playing career: 1994–2009

Jeremy Joseph Stevenson (born July 28, 1974) is an American-born Canadian former professional ice hockey left winger who last played for the Kalamazoo Wings of the International Hockey League.

== Early life ==
Born in San Bernardino, California, Stevenson grew up in Elliot Lake, Ontario, where he played for the Elliot Lake Vikings of the Northern Ontario Junior Hockey League.

== Career ==
Stevenson was originally drafted in the third round, 60th overall by the Winnipeg Jets in the 1992 NHL entry draft. He was later drafted in the 11th round, 262nd overall, by the Mighty Ducks of Anaheim in the 1994 NHL entry draft. He also played in the NHL for the Nashville Predators, Minnesota Wild and the Dallas Stars. Stevenson played a total of 207 regular season games, scoring 19 goals and assists for 38 points collecting 451 penalty minutes. He also played 21 playoff games, scoring five assists and collecting 20 penalty minutes. Stevenson then played for the Rødovre Mighty Bulls of the Danish Elite League before moving to Finland's SM-liiga with KalPa.

== Career statistics ==
| | | | Regular season | | | | | Playoffs |
| Season | Team | League | GP | G | A | Pts | PIM | GP | G | A | Pts | PIM |
|---|---|---|---|---|---|---|---|---|---|---|---|---|
| 1988–89 | Elliot Lake Contractors U18 AAA | GNML | — | — | — | — | — | — | — | — | — | — |
| 1989–90 | Elliot Lake Vikings | NOJHL | 61 | 39 | 26 | 65 | 203 | — | — | — | — | — |
| 1990–91 | Cornwall Royals | OHL | 58 | 13 | 20 | 33 | 124 | — | — | — | — | — |
| 1991–92 | Cornwall Royals | OHL | 63 | 15 | 23 | 38 | 176 | 6 | 3 | 1 | 4 | 4 |
| 1992–93 | Newmarket Royals | OHL | 54 | 28 | 28 | 56 | 144 | 5 | 5 | 1 | 6 | 28 |
| 1993–94 | Newmarket Royals | OHL | 9 | 2 | 4 | 6 | 27 | — | — | — | — | — |
| 1993–94 | Sault Ste. Marie Greyhounds | OHL | 48 | 18 | 19 | 37 | 183 | 14 | 1 | 1 | 2 | 23 |
| 1994–95 | Greensboro Monarchs | ECHL | 43 | 14 | 13 | 27 | 231 | 17 | 6 | 11 | 17 | 64 |
| 1995–96 | Mighty Ducks of Anaheim | NHL | 3 | 0 | 1 | 1 | 12 | — | — | — | — | — |
| 1995–96 | Baltimore Bandits | AHL | 60 | 11 | 10 | 21 | 295 | 12 | 4 | 2 | 6 | 23 |
| 1996–97 | Mighty Ducks of Anaheim | NHL | 5 | 0 | 0 | 0 | 0 | — | — | — | — | — |
| 1996–97 | Baltimore Bandits | AHL | 25 | 8 | 8 | 16 | 125 | 3 | 0 | 0 | 0 | 8 |
| 1997–98 | Mighty Ducks of Anaheim | NHL | 45 | 3 | 5 | 8 | 101 | — | — | — | — | — |
| 1997–98 | Cincinnati Mighty Ducks | AHL | 10 | 5 | 0 | 5 | 34 | — | — | — | — | — |
| 1998–99 | Cincinnati Mighty Ducks | AHL | 22 | 4 | 4 | 8 | 83 | 3 | 1 | 0 | 1 | 2 |
| 1999–00 | Cincinnati Mighty Ducks | AHL | 41 | 11 | 14 | 25 | 100 | — | — | — | — | — |
| 2000–01 | Nashville Predators | NHL | 8 | 1 | 0 | 1 | 39 | — | — | — | — | — |
| 2000–01 | Milwaukee Admirals | IHL | 60 | 16 | 13 | 29 | 262 | 5 | 2 | 0 | 2 | 12 |
| 2001–02 | Nashville Predators | NHL | 4 | 0 | 0 | 0 | 0 | — | — | — | — | — |
| 2001–02 | Milwaukee Admirals | AHL | 53 | 12 | 7 | 19 | 192 | — | — | — | — | — |
| 2002–03 | Minnesota Wild | NHL | 32 | 5 | 6 | 11 | 69 | 14 | 0 | 5 | 5 | 12 |
| 2002–03 | Houston Aeros | AHL | 18 | 6 | 7 | 13 | 77 | — | — | — | — | — |
| 2003–04 | Minnesota Wild | NHL | 3 | 0 | 0 | 0 | 0 | — | — | — | — | — |
| 2003–04 | Nashville Predators | NHL | 54 | 5 | 4 | 9 | 103 | 6 | 0 | 0 | 0 | 8 |
| 2004–05 | South Carolina Stingrays | ECHL | 42 | 9 | 20 | 29 | 140 | 3 | 1 | 0 | 1 | 2 |
| 2005–06 | Nashville Predators | NHL | 35 | 4 | 3 | 7 | 74 | — | — | — | — | — |
| 2005–06 | Milwaukee Admirals | AHL | 3 | 0 | 0 | 0 | 9 | — | — | — | — | — |
| 2005–06 | Dallas Stars | NHL | 16 | 1 | 0 | 1 | 21 | 1 | 0 | 0 | 0 | 0 |
| 2006–07 | Amarillo Gorillas | CHL | 4 | 0 | 4 | 4 | 8 | — | — | — | — | — |
| 2006–07 | Prolab de Thetford Mines | LNAH | 5 | 3 | 7 | 10 | 6 | — | — | — | — | — |
| 2006–07 | Rødovre Mighty Bulls | DEN | 4 | 3 | 2 | 5 | 31 | 4 | 0 | 0 | 0 | 10 |
| 2007–08 | KalPa | FIN | 46 | 4 | 2 | 6 | 113 | — | — | — | — | — |
| 2008–09 | Kalamazoo Wings | IHL | 8 | 7 | 4 | 11 | 8 | — | — | — | — | — |
| NHL totals | | | 207 | 19 | 19 | 38 | 451 | 21 | 0 | 5 | 5 | 20 |
