= Thunder Bay Bandits =

- City: Thunder Bay, Ontario, Canada
- League: Lakehead Junior Hockey League
- Founded: 2009
- Home arena: Thunder Bay Tournament Centre
- Colors: Black, Orange, and White
- Owner: Derek Geddes

Franchise history
- 2009–2017: Thunder Bay Stars
- 2017–2020: Thunder Bay Fighting Walleye
- 2020: Kam River Pickerel
- 2020–present: Thunder Bay Bandits

The Thunder Bay Bandits are a Canadian junior B ice hockey team based in Thunder Bay, Ontario. They play in the Lakehead Junior Hockey League eligible to compete for the Central Canada Cup formerly the Keystone Cup for the Junior B championship of Western Canada.

== History ==
The Thunder Bay Stars joined the Thunder Bay Junior B Hockey League in 2009. The team was formed after the K&A Wolverines accepted an invitation to play Junior A in the Superior International Junior Hockey League.

In both 2010 and 2011, the Stars finished third in the regular season, but managed to upset the second place Nipigon Elks in the league semi-finals to earn entrance into the league finals. In both cases, the Stars were defeated by the Thunder Bay Northern Hawks.

At the end of the 2016–17 season, long-time Stars owners Dave and Scott Simpson sold the franchise to Derek Geddes. The team was rebranded as the Thunder Bay Fighting Walleye.

For the 2018 season British Columbia, Alberta, and Saskatchewan elected not to participate in the Keystone Cup. As a result, the tournament was reorganized to feature the LJHL and KJHL champion and runner-up. Although the Thunder Bay Northern Hawks won the LJHL championship, the new format allowed the Fighting Walleye make their first Keystone Cup tournament. They returned to the Keystone Cup the following season as well, and then were awarded hosting duties for the 2020 tournament. However, the 2020 tournament would be cancelled due to the COVID-19 pandemic.

Prior to the 2020–21 season the team rebranded once again as the Kam River Pickerel, but was instead sold and rebranded again as Thunder Bay Bandits.

== Season-by-season standings ==
Season	GP	W	L	T	OTL	Pts	GF	GA	Results	Playoffs
2009-10	30	6	24	0	---	12	123	222	3rd of 3	Won Semifinals, 3-1 vs Elks; Lost Finals, 0-4 vs Northern Hawks
2010-11	30	9	17	4	---	22	123	161	3rd of 4	Won Semifinals, 3-1 vs Elks; Lost Finals, 0-4 vs Northern Hawks
2011-12	32	15	17	0	---	30	149	171	3rd of 5	Lost Semifinals, 2-3 vs Elks
2012-13	32	14	17	1	---	29	140	143	3rd of 5	Lost Semifinals, 3-4 vs Elks
2013-14	30	16	12	2	---	34	123	104	2nd of 4	Won Semifinals, 4-1 vs Elks; Lost Finals, 1-4 vs Northern Hawks
2014-15	30	15	15	0	---	30	149	132	2nd of 4	Won Semifinals, 4-1 vs Elks; Lost Finals, 0-4 vs Northern Hawks
2015-16	32	27	5	0	---	54	210	81	1st of 5	Won Semifinals, 4-0 vs Falcons; Lost Finals, 2-4 vs Northern Hawks
2016-17	30	4	22	4	---	12	114	231	3rd of 4	Lost Semifinals, 1-4 vs Elks
2017-18	28	16	8	4	---	36	212	109	1st of 4	Won Semifinals, 4-0 vs Falcons; Lost Finals, 1-4 vs Northern Hawks
2018–19	30	17	10	4	---	38	187	96	2nd of 4	Won Semifinals, 4-0 vs Elks; Lost Finals, 1-4 vs Northern Hawks
2019–20	27	17	8	1	1	36	143	104	2nd of 4	Playoffs cancelled due to COVID-19
2020–21	Cancelled due to COVID-19									
2021–22	18	17	0	1	---	35	111	51	1st of 4	Won Semifinals, 4-2 vs (Elks); WON Finals, 4-1 (Northern Hawks); LJHL CHAMPIONS
2022–23	24	5	17	2	---	12	57	97	5 of 5	Lost 1st Round, 0-2 vs (Elks)
2023–24	24	7	14	1	2	17	92	129	4 of 5	Won 1st Round, 2-0 vs (Elks); Lost Semifinals 1-4 (Storm)
2024–25	24	8	15	0	1	17	73	113	4 of 5	Lost Semifinals, 0-3 vs (Storm)
2025–26	24	13	8	1	2	29	108	105	3 of 5	Lost Semifinals, 2-3 vs (Northern Hawks)

== Keystone Cup history ==
Central Canadian Jr. B Championships (Northern Ontario to Saskatchewan)

Year	Round-robin	Record	Standing	Gold medal game	Bronze medal game
2018 (Note: British Columbia, Alberta, and Saskatchewan did not send teams to Keystone Cup)	W, 7–2 vs. Peguis Juniors; L, 1–3 vs. St. Malo Warriors; L, 3–9 vs. Thunder Bay Northern Hawks	1–2–0	3rd of 4	---	L, 3–6 vs Peguis Juniors in semifinal - Bronze medalist
2019	L, 3–4 vs. Thunder Bay Northern Hawks; W, 6–2 vs. Cross Lake Islanders; W, 6–0 vs. Peguis Juniors	2–1–0	2nd of 4	L, 2–4 vs Thunder Bay Northern Hawks; Silver medalist	—
