= Cypress Cyclones =

The Cypress Cyclones were a Canadian Junior ice hockey franchise from Maple Creek, Saskatchewan. They last played in the South Division of the Prairie Junior Hockey League.

Expansion season was 2005 into the Northern Saskatchewan Junior Hockey League. For the 2007–2008 season the Northern and Southern leagues merged to form the Prairie Junior Hockey League.

On June 27, 2010, the team was granted a leave of absence for the 2010–11 season. The team returned to the PJHL in 2011–2012.

The Cyclones' home arena is the Maple Creek Community Arena (built in 2004). Their colours are green, white, and black. The team's expansion season came in 2005–2006 where they registered 11 wins and finished in fifth place. Their best season was 2006/07 when they had 17 wins and lost in the South semi final to the Pilot Butte Storm. The Cyclone organization has only made the post season 3 out of 7 seasons, and have missed the post season the past 4 seasons.

Effective November 12, 2014, the Cyclones ceased operations after voluntarily withdrawing their membership to the PJHL, as announced by the league. As the team was dissolved midway through the 2014–15 season, the remaining teams of the South Division would have their games rescheduled in order to maintain a 38-game season.

== Season-by-season record ==
Note: GP = Games played, W = Wins, L = Losses, T = Ties, OTL = Overtime Losses, Pts = Points, GF = Goals for, GA = Goals against

Season	GP	W	L	T	OTL	Pts	GF	GA	Finish	Playoffs
Prairie Junior Hockey League
2007–08	36	13	19	–	4	30	119	145	4th, South	Won Div. Survivor Series, 2–0 (Capitals); Lost Div. SemiFinals, 1–4 (Storm)
2008–09	42	15	21	–	6	36	146	183	5th, South	Did not qualify
2009–10	42	9	26	–	7	25	109	177	6th, South	Did not qualify
Leave of Absence
2011–12	40	9	28	–	3	21	139	242	6th, South	Did not qualify
2012–13	40	9	29	–	2	20	127	273	6th, South	Did not qualify
2013–14	40	3	36	–	1	7	79	327	7th, South	Did not qualify'
2014–15	Ceased Operations									

CAREER REGULAR SEASON POINT LEADERS: 1. Dallas McIntosh, Lucky Lake SK (130) 2. Lane Sanderson, Consul SK (114) 3. Cade Slusar, Swift Current SK (109) 4. Brock Chisholm, Fox Valley SK (107) 5. Curtis Moorhead, Maple Creek SK (102) 6. Kevin Paul, Swift Current SK (92) 7. Clay Cooke, Gull Lake SK (87) 8. Kody Orr, Swift Current SK (82) 9. Colby Schneider, Kyle SK (75) 10. Craig Fournier, Maple Creek SK (72) 11. Garett Stokke, Consul SK (68) 12. Todd Doepker, Moose Jaw SK (67) 13. Steven Eberts, Dilke SK (60) 14. Tyler Pellack, North Battleford SK (55) 15. Maverick Holmes, Gull Lake SK (55) 16. Dalton Kaake, Maple Creek SK (50) 17. Rylan McKinnon, Maple Creek SK (50) 18. Chad Trapp, Gull Lake SK (49) 19. Chad Fournier, Maple Creek SK (49) 20. Shaun Dale, Claydon SK (43)

CAREER GOALTENDING: Minutes Played: Donald Schmaltz, Fox Valley SK (3744) Wins: Donald Schmaltz, Fox Valley SK (14) Save Percentage: Kelly Andrew, Calgary AB (.923) GAA: Kelly Andrew, Calgary AB (3.11) Play-off wins: Kevin Woloshyn, Selkirk MB (3)

PENALTY MINUTES: 1. Chad Fournier, Maple Creek SK (562) 2. Jaylan Arndt, Maple Creek SK (490) 3. Maverick Holmes, Gull Lake SK (355) 4. Curtis Moorhead, Maple Creek SK (294) 5. Colby Schneider, Kyle SK (259)

TEAM CAPTAINS: 1. Derek Behrman, Consul SK (2005) 2. Curtis Moorhead, Maple Creek SK (2006) 3. Garett Stokke, Consul SK (2007) 4. Brock Chisholm, Fox Valley SK (2008, 2009) 5. Rylan McKinnon, Maple Creek SK (2011) 6. Lane Sanderson, Consul SK (2012)

TEAM MVP: 1. Curtis Moorhead (2005) 2. Cade Slusar (2006) 3. Todd Doepker (2007) 4. Brock Chisholm/Clay Cooke (2008) 5. Clay Cooke (2009) 6. Rylan McKinnon/Donald Schmaltz (2011) 7. Dallas McIntosh/Donald Schmaltz (2012)

TOP D-MAN: 1. Rylan McKinnon (2011) 2. Josh Wik (2012)

ROOKIE OF THE YEAR: 1. Cade Slusar (2005) 2. Kevin Paul (2006) 3. Colby Schneider (2007) 4. Kody Orr (2008) 5. Rylan McKinnon (2009) 6. Craig Fournier/Dallas McIntosh (2011) 7. Dalton Kaake (2012)

PLAY OFF MVP: 1. Kevin Woloshyn (2005–2006) 2. Kevin Woloshyn/Curtis Moorhead (2006–2007) 3. Steven Eberts/Kelly Andrew (2007–2008)

COACHING STAFF / MANAGEMENT: Blaine Stork – Head Coach and GM (2005–2009) Al Fournier – Head Coach (2011), GM/President (2012–present) Sean Chapman – Director of Player Personnel / Associate Coach (2005–2008) President/GM (2011) Jack Cameron – Assistant Coach (2005–2009, 2012–present) Bryce Weiss – Assistant Coach (2009–2010) Garett Stokke – Assistant Coach (2011–present) Derek Behrman – Assistant Coach/Assistant GM (2012–present)

CYCLONE PJHL AWARD WINNERS:

- Cade Slusar – 2005/06 rookie all star, 2006/07 1st team all star, 2006/07 League MVP
- Todd Doepker – 2005–06 rookie all star
- Curtis Moorhead – 2006/07 1st team all star
- Garett Stokke – 2006/07 1st team all star, 2006/07 Top Defenseman
- Steven Eberts – 2006/07 rookie all star
- Kevin Paul – 2006/07 rookie all star
- Grant Gilbertson – 2006/07 Barry Karst Memorial Scholarship
- Blaine Stork – 2006/07 PJHL Coach of the Year
- Rylan McKinnon – 2011/12 1st team all star
- Craig Fournier – 2011/12 Co-Rookie of the Year
- Lane Sanderson – 2012/13 Most Sportsmanlike

ALUMNI:

- Derek Behrman – Dakota College at Bottineau (NJCAA) and Iowa State University (ACHA)
- Craig Harvey – Minot State (ACHA)
- Kelly Andrew – Concordia College (NCAA)
- Kevin Paul – Sioux Lookout Flyers (SIJHL)
- Craig Fournier – Minot State (ACHA)
- Rylan McKinnon – Portage College Voyageurs (ACAC)
- Dalton Kaake – Waldorf College (ACHA)
- Lane Sanderson – Waldorf College (ACHA)
- Drew Soderberg – Waldorf College (ACHA)
