= Brewers Cup =

Junior ice hockey tournament in Canada

The Brewers Cup was a Junior C ice hockey tournament hosted by Hockey Regina and the Saskatchewan Junior C Hockey League. The winner decided the Western Canada Junior "C" champion.

The tournament ran from 1992 until 2014.

== Leagues ==
Leagues that sent competitors to the event.

- Calgary Junior C Hockey League
- Manitoba Major Junior Hockey League
- Noralta Junior Hockey League
- Qu'Appelle Valley Hockey League
- Thunder Bay Junior B Hockey League

== Champions ==
Year	Champions	Finalist
1992	Regina Brewers - Sask	Calgary Crowchild - Alberta
1993	Regina Brewers - Sask	Edmonton St. Albert - Alberta
1994	Winnipeg Cobras - Manitoba	Regina Brewers - Sask
1995	Regina Brewers - Sask	Regina Bulldogs - Sask
1996	Calgary CNC - Alberta	Regina Brewers - Sask
1997	Nipigon Elks - Ontario	Regina Wolverines - Sask
1998	Nipigon Elks - Ontario	Calgary Southland - Alberta
1999	Regina Bulldog - Sask	Calgary CNC - Alberta
2000	Nipigon Elks - Ontario	Calgary CNC - Alberta
2001	Nipigon Elks - Ontario	Stonewall Jets - Manitoba
2002	Calgary McKnight - Alberta	Regina Hurricanes - Sask
2003	Thunder Bay Northern Hawks - Ontario	Airdrie Thunder - Alberta
2004	Regina Brewers - Sask	Airdrie Thunder - Alberta
2005	Regina Bulldogs - Sask	Regina River Rats - Sask
2006	Regina Hurricanes - Sask	Southey Marlins - Sask
2007	Odessa Eagles - Sask	Regina Bulldogs - Sask
2008	Varsity View - Manitoba	Odessa Eagles - Sask
2009	Millet Lightning - Alberta	Edmonton SWZ Sentinels - Alberta
2010	Odessa Eagles - Sask	Nipigon Elks - Ontario
2011	Edmonton Avalanche - Alberta	Odessa Eagles - Sask
2012	Odessa Eagles - Sask	Southey Marlins - Sask
2013	Nipigon Elks - Ontario	Odessa Eagles - Sask
2014	Lumsden Lumberjax - Sask	Regina Brewers - Sask
