= Wawa Travellers =

Junior ice hockey team in Ontario

- City: Wawa, Ontario
- League: North of Superior Junior B Hockey League
- Operated: 1996-2004
- Home arena: Michipicoten Memorial Centre
- Colours: Red, Blue, and White

The Wawa Travellers were a Junior "B" team based out of Wawa, Ontario. They played in the North of Superior Junior B Hockey League.

== History ==
The Travellers played in all eight of the NSHL's seasons. After a slow start, the team moved through the standings and in their final two seasons they topped the league, winning the league championship, in both 2002-03 and 2003-04. Despite two championships, the Travellers finished their story in 2004 with a 4-straight-losses to the Thunder Bay Northern Hawks of Thunder Bay Junior B Hockey League in the Northern Ontario Regional Junior B Hockey Championship.

After the 2003-04 season, the Thessalon Flyers and Aguasabon River Rats left the NSHL. With only the Travellers and the Marathon Renegades left in the league, it folded.

The Marathon Renegades joined the Superior International Junior Hockey League in 2006-07. Wawa has been trying to join the SIJHL since 2005, but has been left on the outside looking in until they can find adequate financial backing.

== Season-by-season results ==
Season	GP	W	L	T	OTL	GF	GA	P	Results	Playoffs
1996-97	-	-	-	-	-	-	-	-	NSHL	
1997-98	28	9	17	2	-	123	167	20	5th NSHL	DNQ
1998-99*	23	3	18	2	-	116	174	8	5th NSHL	DNQ
1999-00	24	10	14	0	-	151	155	20	3rd NSHL	
2000-01	24	12	12	-	0	121	133	24	3rd NSHL	
2001-02	24	15	6	-	3	132	90	33	2nd NSHL	
2002-03	24	13	9	-	2	127	121	28	1st NSHL	Won League
2003-04	24	14	9	-	1	116	101	29	2nd NSHL	Won League

(*) There are no complete stats available for this season.

== Sources ==
- "Renegades take lead in Junior B series". The Sault Star. 1997-03-04. p. A8. ProQuest 348311946.
- "Travellers clinch Junior B crown". The Sault Star. 2004-03-18. p. B4. ProQuest 348545230.
- Wray, Chris (October 2008). "We've all "been there, done that"". Northern Ontario Business. Vol. 28, no. 12. p. 20. Gale A188138614.
