= Kinistino Tigers =

Kinistino Jr. Tigers
- City: Kinistino, Saskatchewan
- League: North Saskatchewan Junior Hockey League
- Founded: 1970–71
- Home arena: Kinistino Sports Complex
- Colours: Black, Orange, White

The Kinistino Jr. Tigers were a team in the North Saskatchewan Junior B Hockey League (NSJHL) from 1970–1997. Originally called the Kinistino Tiger-Bruins, the team was renamed to the Tigers following the 1983–1984 season. The Tigers played out of the Kinistino Sports Complex in Kinistino, Saskatchewan for the duration of the team's existence. The team folded after the 1996–1997 season due to the inability to attract young players to play in the small town.

== History ==
=== Tiger-Bruins ===
In 1970 Kinistino was granted a franchise into the NSJHL and began an affiliation with the Estevan Bruins of the WHL. Though, Estevan would move to Westminster after the first year, the working agreement continued. George Longman acted as the manager for the Tiger-Bruins until 1981 when the franchise asked for, and received a leave of absence from the league. While the Tigers failed to capture any championships during this period two skaters, Theran Welsh (1973–74) and Wade Hoffus (1976–77) led the league in scoring.

=== Tigers ===
After a leave of absence, Kinistino rejoined the NSHJL to start the 1983–84 season. Coached by former player Les Jack the team started to build into a competitive club with talented players, but again failed to win any league championships despite boasting the league leader scorer in every season during the 1980s, with the exception of the 1985–1986 season. In 1988 the Tigers would come close to their first championship, falling short in the best of seven to the Warman Valley Crusaders (who would go on to win the Keystone Cup).

=== Dynasty Years ===
==== 1989–1991 ====
In, 1989 the Tigers would finally capture their first league championship. Led by scoring champion Dave Morrell and NSJHL Playoff MVP Mike Rooney, the Tigers would advance to the Western Junior B Championships for the first time as the Saskatchewan representative. Though they were less successful, the experience would prove beneficial. The Tigers continued to build strong teams, winning back to back league champions and then became the first team to win three league championships in a row. The Tigers third trip to the Western Championships would see them finally achieve the ultimate goal, winning the gold medal game to capture the Keystone Cup.

==== 1991–1992 ====
Following their championship in 1991 the Tigers had a great opportunity as they were selected as hosts for the 1992 Western Canadian Junior Champions. Though the pressure to win was added by hosting the tournament the Tigers put together another solid season, defeating the Saskatoon Chiefs in the league finals. They would them come through in front of the home crowd, defeating the Chiefs in the gold medal game 7–2 to capture back-to-back Keystone Cups.

==== 1992–1993 ====
The 1993 season was similar to the previous four, seeing the Tigers win their fifth straight NSHJL Championship. After the formation of the South Saskatchewan Junior Hockey League (SSJHL), winning the league wasn't an automatic berth into the Keystone Cup and the Tigers were forced to play a best of five series against the SSJHL Champion, the Assiniboia Southern Rebels. The Tigers won the first two games played in Kinistino by identical 7–3 scores and then ended the series with a 4–0 shutout of the Rebels in Assiniboia, earning them their fourth provincial title in as many years.

Going into the Keystone Cup the Tigers had an opportunity to win three straight titles, a feat that had never been completed. Poised to make history the Tigers found themselves in the championship game against the Lloydminster Bandits. The Bandits had handed the Tigers their only loss during the round robin of the tournament and would prevail again, sending the Tigers away with a silver medal.

==== 1993–1994 ====
The Tigers would win their final league and provincial championship, stopping the total at six consecutive championships, which at the time was a record for the most consecutive provincial Junior B championships. (The title previously belonged to the Lebret Indians (1955–1959).) Kinistino travelled to Thunder Bay to compete in the Keystone Cup and would again win the tournament, defeating the Selkirk Fisherman in the championship game by a score of 5–3. The win made Kinistino the first team to win the Keystone Cup three times, which is now a record they share with the Assiniboia Southern Rebels.

=== 1994–1995 and the demise of the franchise ===
During the 1994 season the Tigers continued to dominate and sat in first place going into the playoffs. Many assumed it would be another league championship was close at hand, but the upstart Saskatoon Royals had put together an impressive season while being overshadowed by the dominant Tigers. When the two clubs met in the league championship it was the underdogs from the bridge city that would come out victorious winning game seven in double overtime. After falling to the Royals, the Tigers would never field a championship team again. The pressure of attracting hockey talent to the small community and funding a team eventually led to the team folding following the 1996–1997 season.

== Notable Tiger Alumni ==
- Grant Jennings: (Player) Washington Capitals, Toronto Maple Leafs, Pittsburgh Penguins (91 & 92 Stanley Cup Champion), Buffalo Sabres, Hartford Whalers
- Jason Duda: (Player) Melfort Mustangs, Saskatoon Blades, Wichita Thunder
- Les Jack: (Player) Estevan Bruins, Prince Albert Raiders, (Coach) Melfort Mustangs, Prince Albert Raiders
- Mike Rooney: (Coach) Kindersley Klippers (GM / Asst Coach) Notre Dame Hounds (Scout) Nashville Predators Buffalo Sabres
- Steve Tansowny: (Player) University of Saskatchewan Huskies
- Mark Brenner: (Player) University of Saskatchewan Huskies
- Lee Carfantan: (Player) Melfort Mustangs
- Brock Irvine: (Player) Nipawin Hawks
- Trevor Turnbull: (Player) University of Saskatchewan
- Jordi Carter: (Player) New York Rangers

== Records ==
Team Records
| Statistic | Total | Season |
|---|---|---|
| Consecutive Provincial Championships | 6 | 1989–1994 |
| Keystone Cup Championships | 3 | 1991–92,1994 |

== Awards ==
Clarence Ebert Memorial Trophy (NSJHL League MVP)
| Player | Season |
|---|---|
| Darrell Mann | 1984–1985 |
| Keith MacKintosh | 1987–1988 |
| Troy Van Allen | 1989–1990 |
| Todd MacMurchy | 1995–1996 |

Syl Panchuk Memorial Award (NSJHL Playoff MVP)
| Player | Season |
|---|---|
| Mike Rooney | 1988–1989 |
| Dave Morrell | 1989–1990 |
| Regan Harper | 1990–1991 |
| Chris Kirwin | 1992–1993 |
| Steve Tansowney | 1993–1994 |

Al Ure Trophy (League Scoring Title)
| Player | Season |
|---|---|
| Theran Welsh | 1973–1974 |
| Wade Hoffer | 1976–1977 |
| Darrell Mann | 1984–1985 |
| Dave Rioch | 1986–1987 |
| Joe McKay | 1987–1988 |
| Dave Morrell | 1988–1989 |
| Troy Van Allen | 1989–1990 |
| Trevor Morrison | 1991–1992 |
| Todd MacMurchy | 1995–1996 |

Bob King Trophy (Best Goaltender)
| Player | Season |
|---|---|
| Dione Bacon – Obie Davis – Pat MacKintosh | 1989–1990 |
| Jeff Taylor – Devin Fink | 1990–1991 |
| Jaeson Swanson – Greg Denham | 1991–1992 |
| Mark Brenner – Steve Tansowny | 1992–1993 |
| Mark Brenner – Steve Tansowny | 1993–1994 |
| Mark Brenner – Jason Ripplinger | 1994–1995 |
| Mark Brenner – Robb Galatiuk | 1995–1996 |

== See also ==
- List of ice hockey teams in Saskatchewan

== Notes ==
| Preceded by Warman Valley Crusaders | North Saskatchewan Junior Hockey League Champions; 1989–1994 | Succeeded by Saskatoon Royals |
| Preceded by Warman Valley Crusaders | Athol Murray Trophy Champions; 1989–1994 | Succeeded by Regina Capitals |
| Preceded by Columbia Valley Rockies | Keystone Cup Champions; 1991–92 and 1994 | Succeeded by Lloydminster Bandits |
