= William Ryan Trophy =

The William Ryan Trophy is a Canadian ice hockey series to determine the Northwestern Ontario seed of the Keystone Cup - the Western Canada Junior "B" Hockey championship. Hockey Northwestern Ontario sanctioned league winners play-off for the trophy.

== History ==
From 1997 until 2004, the right to compete in the Keystone Cup was an epic battle between the champions of the Thunder Bay Junior B Hockey League and the North of Superior Junior B Hockey League. After six championships competed for, each league had three Northwestern Ontario titles each, but in the last two years of competition the TBJBHL won both years.

As the NSHL folded in 2004, the TBJBHL won the eight-year series five championships to three. With Junior "A" hockey expansion in the region (from just the Thunder Bay Flyers in 2000 to the Superior International Junior Hockey League in 2007) the local talent pools have been severely taxed making the Junior "B" teams less dominant at the national level. The result has been the contraction of the TBJBHL.

The only time the Northwestern Ontario champion has ever won the Western Canadian title was in 1999 when the Fort William Hurricanes went the distance.

The region has hosted the Keystone Cup five times. Thunder Bay, Ontario hosted the Cup in 1994, 1999 and 2009. Schreiber, Ontario hosted the second-ever tournament in 1984 and again in 2004.

== Champions ==
Season	Winner	Runner-up
1996-97	Northwest Wildcats (TBJBHL)	Marathon Renegades (NSHL)
1997-98	Hearst Elans (NSHL)	Fort William Hurricanes (TBJBHL)
1998-99	Hearst Elans (NSHL)	Fort William Hurricanes (TBJBHL)
1999-00	Fort William Hurricanes (TBJBHL)	Aguasabon River Rats (NSHL)
2000-01	Westfort Maroons (TBJBHL)	Aguasabon River Rats (NSHL)
2001-02	Aguasabon River Rats (NSHL)	Westfort Maroons (TBJBHL)
2002-03	Nipigon Elks (TBJBHL)	Wawa Travellers (NSHL)
2003-04	Thunder Bay Northern Hawks (TBJBHL)	Wawa Travellers (NSHL)

There has been no trophy competition since the demise of the NSHL after the 2003–04 season.

== See also ==
- Thunder Bay Junior B Hockey League
- North of Superior Junior B Hockey League
- Hockey Northwestern Ontario
- Northern Ontario Hockey Association
- Ontario Hockey Federation
