= Ontario Hockey Federation =

Ice hockey governing body in Ontario, Canada

- Sport: Ice Hockey
- Jurisdiction: Ontario (partial)
- Abbreviation: OHF
- Founded: 1989

Official website
- www.ohf.on.ca

The Ontario Hockey Federation (OHF) is the governing body of all sanctioned ice hockey in the province of Ontario in Canada, except for those portions governed by Hockey Northwestern Ontario and the Hockey Eastern Ontario. The federation is one of Hockey Canada's thirteen regional branches.

During the summer in 1989, the Metro Toronto Hockey League (MTHL) and the Ontario Minor Hockey Association (OMHA), broke away from the Ontario Hockey Association (OHA) and formed the Central Canada Hockey Association, due to disagreement with an OHA restructuring proposal which would have limited their voting powers. The dispute ended when the OHF was established, with equal representation for the OHA, Northern Ontario Hockey Association, MTHL, and OMHA. OHA president Brent Ladds was named executive director of the OHF, which was given the mandate to oversee hockey in Ontario, and be a review panel for three years to propose further restructuring if necessary.

== Membership ==
- Alliance Hockey
- Greater Toronto Hockey League
- Northern Ontario Hockey Association
- Ontario Hockey Association
- Ontario Hockey League
- Ontario Minor Hockey Association
- Ontario Women's Hockey Association

== William T. Ruddock Trophy ==
William T. Ruddock Trophy

The William T. Ruddock Trophy is presented by the Ontario Hockey Federation to top Junior "A" hockey club within their jurisdiction. The trophy is awarded at the Dudley Hewitt Cup tournament to the winner of the round robin game between the Ontario Junior Hockey League champion and the Northern Ontario Junior Hockey League champion. In the past, the now defunct Metro Junior A Hockey League's champion also competed for the trophy.

=== Winners ===
1994 Caledon Canadians (MetJHL)
1995 Brampton Capitals (OPJHL)
1996 Newmarket 87's (OPJHL)
1997 Rayside-Balfour Sabrecats (NOJHL)
1998 Milton Merchants (OPJHL)
1999 Bramalea Blues (OPJHL)
2000 Rayside-Balfour Sabrecats (NOJHL)
2001 Thornhill Rattlers (OPJHL)
2002 Rayside-Balfour Sabrecats (NOJHL)
2003 North Bay Skyhawks (NOJHL)
2004 Aurora Tigers (OPJHL)
2005 St. Michael's Buzzers (OPJHL)
2006 Sudbury Jr. Wolves (NOJHL)
2007 Aurora Tigers (OPJHL)
2008 Oakville Blades (OPJHL)
2009 Kingston Voyageurs (OJHL)
2010 Oakville Blades (OJAHL)
2011 Wellington Dukes (OJHL)
2012 Soo Thunderbirds (NOJHL)
2013 St. Michael's Buzzers (OJHL)
2014 Toronto Lakeshore Patriots (OJHL)
2015 Toronto Patriots (OJHL)
2016 Trenton Golden Hawks (OJHL)
2017 Georgetown Raiders (OJHL)
2018 Wellington Dukes (OJHL)
2019 Oakville Blades (OJHL)
