= North Saskatchewan Junior B Hockey League =

Defunct Canadian hockey league

North Saskatchewan Jr "B"

The now defunct North Saskatchewan Junior B Hockey League (NSJHL) was an independent, successful Junior "B" ice hockey league in Saskatchewan, Canada, sanctioned by Hockey Canada. The league comprised teams from cities and towns such as Saskatoon and Melfort, situated in the northern part of the province of Saskatchewan. Conversely, a second Junior "B" league, the South Saskatchewan (SSJHL) included teams which were located in towns primarily in the southern part of Saskatchewan, such as Regina, Weyburn and Melville. Players who played at the Junior "B" level were approximately 14-20 years old, and Junior "B" was considered the entry level and a "feeder league" into Junior Hockey in Canada (except where Junior "C" or "D" teams existed). Many players who exhibited a high degree of skill eventually graduated to Junior "A", Collegiate, or Major Junior such as the Western Hockey League teams such as the local Saskatoon Blades or teams located in other western provinces such as the New Westminster Bruins in British Columbia, for example. However, though uncommon, players in Junior "B", much like Junior "A" or Major Junior Hockey in Canada, were eligible for professional draft by the National Hockey League or at the time of their existence, the World Hockey Association.

Teams from the Saskatchewan Junior "B" leagues had some loose, but informal affiliations with Junior "A" or Major Junior teams, however there was no development system in Junior "B", such as the Bantam Draft for Major Junior Hockey in Canada, in which Major Junior teams for example, could formalize specific access to players, through a draft system. Junior "B" players at the time could try out for any other teams which expressed interest, whether it be in Saskatchewan or elsewhere. No NSJHL team provided other teams a development platform for players where they could be "cherry picked" by Major Junior, Junior "A" or Collegiate teams. Additionally, Junior "B" players over the age of 17 were eligible for the NHL amateur draft. Several outstanding NHLers have played Junior B level hockey, these include San Jose Sharks players Logan Couture and Joe Thornton. Teams from the NSJHL or the SSJHL did not play each other during the regular season, however, the champion of each league at the end of the season played for the overall Saskatchewan Junior "B" championship. The overall provincial winner then had the opportunity to play in the Canadian Junior B championships for the Keystone Cup. In 2007, the North Saskatchewan Junior Hockey League joined the Prairie Junior Hockey League with the intention of creating one league.

== History ==
The NSJHL was originally formed in 1966. The first season the league included a team from Saskatoon, the Saskatoon Macs, the Shellbrook Knights, the Melfort TM's, and teams from Prince Albert, Humboldt and Outlook. These six teams participated in the league from 1966 to 1969. In the '69-'70 season, Shellbrook and Melfort both left the league to join other leagues, which provided the opportunity for four new teams to join and represent the cities and towns of North Battleford /St. Thomas, Milden, Unity (Canucks), and another mainstay in the league for years to come, the Saskatoon Wesleys. In 1973 for example, the league consisted of 9 teams including Saskatoon Wesleys, The Saskatoon Quakers, Delisle Bruins, Colonsay Clippers, Battleford Barons, St. Thomas Imperials (1973 League Champs) Kinistino Tiger-Bruins, (Kinistino Tigers) Melfort TMs, and the Nipawan Hawks. Over the years, teams have come and gone, names have changed, however, specific cities have always had teams in the NSJHL, such as Saskatoon and North Battleford. The Saskatoon Wesleys and the Battlefords teams being two of the longstanding franchises to survive and ice a team year over year, until the dissolution of the league in 2007. In some cities for example, Junior B hockey was extremely popular drawing large fan bases, so some of these franchises on the heels of their success moved into bigger, more exciting leagues. An example being the city of Prince Albert, which stepped away from Junior B eventually joining the CHL Western Hockey League as the Prince Albert Raiders to become one of the most prominent Major Junior hockey franchises in Canada with a significant fan base, and many players going to major careers at the professional level. The team in the city of Humboldt, eventually left the NSJHL, and became the Humboldt Broncos, a very highly regarded franchise in the Junior "A" level Saskatchewan Junior Hockey League since 1970. This team has produced many Major Junior and Collegiate level players, as well as many former and current NHL players.

== Teams ==
Team	Centre
Saskatoon Chiefs	Saskatoon
Saskatoon Quakers	Saskatoon
Saskatoon Royals	Saskatoon
Saskatoon Wesleys	Saskatoon
Tri-Town Thunder	Carrot River

== Former teams ==
Team	Centre
Kinistino Tigers	Kinistino
Hudson Bay Saints	Hudson Bay
Prince Albert Generals	Prince Albert
Warman Valley Crusaders	Warman
Big River Timberkings	Big River

- Shellbrook Knights - Shellbrook Saskatchewan
- Melfort TM's - Melfort Saskatchewan
- Meadow Lake Stampeders - Meadow Lake, Saskatchewan
- Prince Albert North Stars - Prince Albert, Saskatchewan
- Battleford Breakers - Battleford, Saskatchewan
- Battleford Barons- Battleford, Saskatchewan

== Season Information ==
1991-92 NSJHL Season

== Champions ==
2007 Saskatoon Royals
2006 Saskatoon Royals
2005 Saskatoon Royals
2004 Tri-Town Thunder
2003 Warman Valley Crusaders
2002 Saskatoon Chiefs
2001 Saskatoon Royals
2000 Saskatoon Royals
1999 Saskatoon Royals
1998 Saskatoon Royals
1997 Saskatoon Royals
1996 Saskatoon Royals
1995 Saskatoon Royals
1994 Kinistino Tigers
1993 Kinistino Tigers
1992 Kinistino Tigers
1991 Kinistino Tigers
1990 Kinistino Tigers
1989 Kinistino Tigers
1988 Warman Valley Crusaders
1987 Hudson Bay Saints
1986 Prince Albert North Stars
1985 Prince Albert North Stars
1984 Saskatoon Westleys
1983 Saskatoon Westleys
1982 Saskatoon Quakers
1981 Hudson Bay Saints
1980 Melfort TM's
1979 Melfort TM's
1978 Saskatoon Quakers
1977 Team Melfort
1976 Team Melfort
1975 Saskatoon Quakers
1974 Saskatoon Quakers
1973 St Thomas Imperials North Battleford
1972 St Thomas Imperials North Battleford
1971 Saskatoon Macs
1970 St Peters College
1969 Prince Albert Knights

== See also ==
- List of ice hockey teams in Saskatchewan
