= Marathon Renegades =

Former junior ice hockey team

- City: Marathon, Ontario
- League: Superior International Junior Hockey League
- Founded: 1996
- Folded: 2008
- Home arena: Marathon Arena
- Colours: Blue, Black, and White
- General manager: Don Savoie
- Head coach: Jim MacDonnell

The Marathon Renegades were a Junior "A" ice hockey team from Marathon, Ontario. They were members of the Superior International Junior Hockey League.

== History ==
They were members of the North of Superior Junior B Hockey League from 1996 until 2004. There was some speculation as to whether or not the team were known as the Marathon Renegades or the North Shore Renegades in the 2006-07 season. When reached for comment, the league stated that they are still currently known as the Marathon Renegades. The Renegades had their official "roll-out" on July 7 in Marathon. The Executive consists of Al Cresswell, President; John Moreau, Past President; Denis Leduc, General Manager; Don Savoie, Assistant General Manager; and John Hooper, Director of Sales/Voice of the Renegades. The Executive introduced the club as North Shore, due to the franchise being split between Marathon and Terrace Bay, however due to conflicts, the franchise now is based in Marathon, and may play some games in White River. The Renegades announced games would be played in Marathon at the Marathon Arena (capacity 680). Home and away jerseys are patterned after the Washington Capitals jerseys of the late 1990s and into the early 2000s.

=== 2006-07 ===
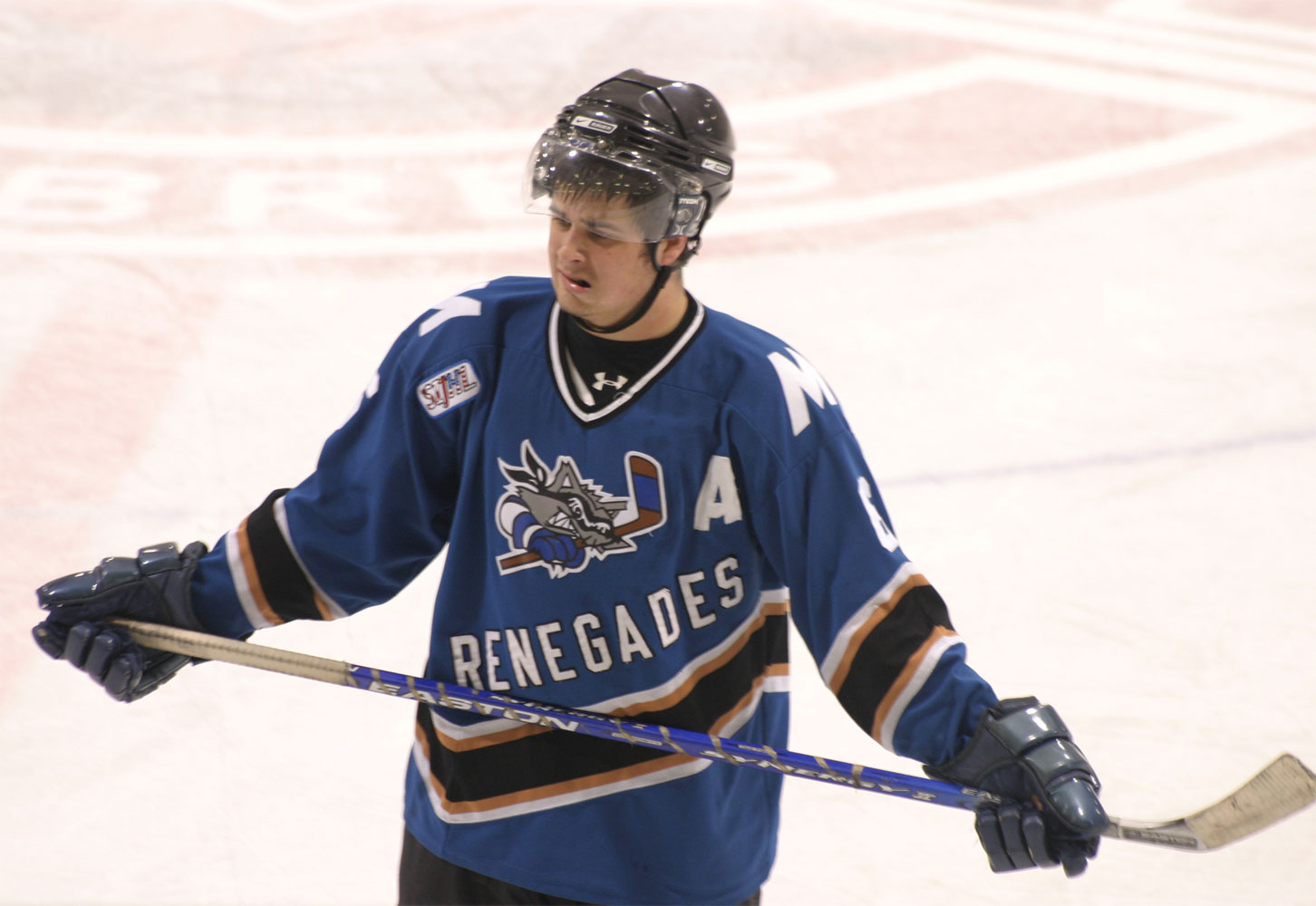
Defenceman Matt Marasco between shifts (2007)

The Renegades' historic first Junior "A" hockey game took place on September 22, 2006 against the Schreiber Diesels with Kyle Leblanc being named captain. The game was something of a nightmare, with the Renegades losing 20-0 to the Diesels and getting outshot 111-10. The only highlight for the Renegades was goalie Adam Guignard who stopped 91 of 111 shots, playing the entire 60 minutes.

Their first home game since the fall of the NSHL took place against the defending Central Canadian Champion Fort William North Stars on September 30, 2006, with the result was lopsided 15-3 loss. On a high point, newly acquired Dave McDonald, formerly of the Manitoba Junior Hockey League's Waywayseecappo Wolverines, scored the Renegades' first ever Junior "A" goal in the loss. The goal came on the powerplay at 15:05 of the second period. In late September, the Renegades released backup goalie Jayms Lyon and picked up Charles Couture from the Estevan Bruins of the Saskatchewan Junior Hockey League.

After 21 consecutive losses since their expansion, the Renegades gained their first ever SIJHL victory on December 3, 2006. After going up on the Thunder Bay Bulldogs by a score of 6-1 after the first period, the Bulldogs scored 5 straight goals to tie up the game by the early third period. At 14:32 of the third, Marathon's Justin Gaudreault scored to put the game away for good. Following an insurance marker, the Renegades defeated the Bulldogs by a score of 8-6. Adam Guignard stopped 45 of 51 shots to clinch the historic first victory. To prove it was not a fluke, the Renegades won their next game on December 8 against the Dryden Ice Dogs 4-1. At the end of the season, Marathon goaltender Adam Guignard was awarded the Daniel Beardy Memorial Trophy as the SIJHL Top Goaltender in the 2006-07 season. Guignard led the league with a 0.916 save percentage.

=== 2007-08 ===
The Marathon Renegades at one point were as high as fourth place in the 2007-08 SIJHL season, but after 37 games played were forced to resign from the rest of the campaign. Their problems resulted from weeks of playing with just over two lines of players. Injuries and early defections were blamed for this. Al Cresswell, team president, claimed that the shortage of players had become a health risk. The Renegades have not suspended operations, but have pulled out of the season.

The Renegades got out to a great start with a record of six wins and seven losses at the start of November, leaving them sitting pretty in the SIJHL standings. The Renegades would not win again for another month and a half making their record 7-13-3-1. The Renegades started cleaning house in November, with Jim MacDonnell becoming the fourth head coach in Renegades history and forward Mike Ainsworth being selected as the new team captain in November 2007, following a string of losing games and a number of players deserting the team or demanding trades. After their seventh win, the Renegades who were very promising going into the season, never won again. After a thirteen game losing streak that would average roughly 10 goals against a game, played with a roster that was usually between 9 and 13 forwards and defensemen, the Renegades requested a leave from the rest of the 2007-08 season citing health concerns for their shortened bench. Their final 13 games will officially be listed as 1-0 forfeit losses.

== Season-by-season results ==
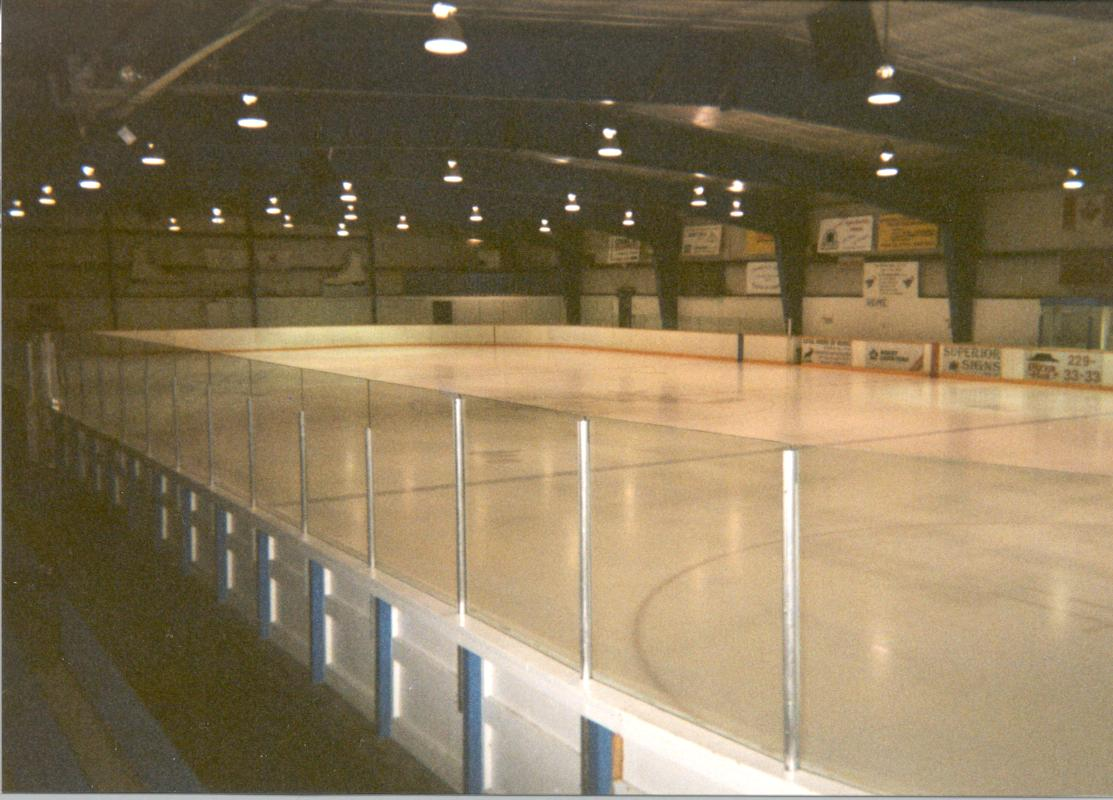
Marathon Arena

Season	GP	W	L	T	OTL	GF	GA	P	Results	Playoffs
1996-97	26	19	5	2	-	140	63	40	1st NSHL	Won League
1997-98	28	12	14	2	-	145	156	26	3rd NSHL	Lost Final
1998-99	25	14	10	1	-	140	148	29	2nd NSHL	
1999-00	24	10	14	-	0	153	149	20	2nd NSHL	
2000-01	24	13	9	-	2	189	112	28	2nd NSHL	
2001-02	24	10	13	-	1	83	107	21	3rd NSHL	
2002-03	24	10	14	-	0	149	170	20	3rd NSHL	Lost Final
2003-04	24	7	15	-	2	95	142	16	4th NSHL	
2004-06	Did Not Participate									
2006-07	50	5	45	0	0	145	404	10	6th SIJHL	DNQ
2007-08	37	7	26	3	1	128	248	18	7th SIJHL	Folded

=== Playoffs ===
- 2007 DNQ
- 2008 Did Not Complete Season
