= Northern Ontario Hockey Association =

Ice hockey governing body

- Sport: Ice hockey
- Jurisdiction: Regional
- Abbreviation: NOHA
- Founded: 1919
- Affiliation: Ontario Hockey Federation
- Affiliation date: 1989
- Headquarters: North Bay, Ontario
- President: Steve Lawrence

Official website
- www.noha-hockey.com
- (Canada)

The Northern Ontario Hockey Association (NOHA) is an ice hockey governing body for minor, junior and senior ice hockey. The NOHA is sanctioned by the Ontario Hockey Federation and Hockey Canada. The major league run by the NOHA is the Northern Ontario Junior Hockey League of the Canadian Junior A Hockey League.

== History ==
The NOHA was founded on October 8, 1919, by Angus D. Campbell. On November 18, 1919, NOHA became an affiliate of the Ontario Hockey Association (OHA). In May 1963, the NOHA applied to the Canadian Amateur Hockey Association to become an equal branch to the OHA. When the request was denied, OHA president Lloyd Pollock stated that measures needed to be put in place to prevent the migration of players southwards to the more populated OHA, and preserve the leagues in Northern Ontario.

During the summer in 1989, the Metro Toronto Hockey League, Ontario Minor Hockey Association (OMHA), OHA and NOHA, joined under the umbrella of the Ontario Hockey Federation (OHF). Each organization was given equal representation on its board of governors, which was given the mandate to oversee hockey in Ontario, and be a review panel for three years to propose further restructuring if necessary.

The senior A-level champions of the NOHA and the OHA formerly competed in a playoffs series for the W. A. Hewitt Trophy.

Former leagues

- International Junior B Hockey League
- North of Superior Junior B Hockey League
- Northern Ontario Junior Hockey Association

== Jurisdiction ==
NOHA has jurisdiction over minor, junior and senior ice hockey (excluding Major Junior) in "the area east of the 85th meridian along the shoreline of Lake Superior and Lake Huron in an easterly direction to the French River, including all of the Manitoulin Islands, along the French River to Highway 69, southerly along Highway 69 to Highway 522, easterly along Highway 522 to the western boundary of the Township of South Himsworth, southerly along the western boundary of the Township of South Himsworth, easterly along the southern boundary of the Township of South Himsworth and the Township of Boulter to the western boundary of Algonquin Provincial Park, northerly along the western boundary of Algonquin Provincial Park to the northern boundary of Algonquin Provincial Park, further from this point easterly along the northern boundary of Algonquin Provincial Park, including the community of Kiosk to the eastern boundary of the OHF’s jurisdiction."
