= Prairie Junior Hockey League =

Junior hockey league in Saskatchewan, Canada

- Formerly: South Saskatchewan Junior Hockey League
- Sport: Ice hockey
- Founded: 1992 as SSJHL
- First season: 1992–93
- Commissioner: Mike Zambon
- No. of teams: 12
- Country: Canada
- Most recent champion: Saskatoon Westleys (2026)
- Most titles: Assiniboia Southern Rebels (7)
- Website: www.pjhl.ca

The Prairie Junior Hockey League is a Junior "B" ice hockey league in Saskatchewan, Canada, sanctioned by Hockey Canada.

== History ==
Originally known as the South Saskatchewan Junior Hockey League (1992–2006) the Prairie Junior Hockey League was founded in 2007–2008 with the merger of the SSJHL and the North Saskatchewan Junior Hockey League (NSJHL).

Previously the playoff winners played-off against the champion of the NSJHL in the Provincial championships (Athol Murray Trophy). Since the amalgamation of the two leagues in 2007, the PJHL has been the only Junior 'B' league in the province; thus its champion has been awarded the provincial title. The provincial champion moves on to compete for the Keystone Cup Western Canadian Junior 'B' championship.

The league draws many players from Saskatchewan. Most teams draft players from nearby towns and cities, though it is not mandatory. Some teams outweigh other teams in the PJHL. For example, the Pilot Butte Storm advanced to the finals eleven years (2005–15) in a row, while the Ochapawace Thunder (0-40-0-0) didn't win a game in the 2015–16 PJHL season.

== Teams ==
Bob Dybvig (North Division)
Team	City	Arena	Joined PJHL
Carrot River Outback Thunder	Carrot River	Kearns Arena	2005
Martensville Chiefs	Martensville	Martensville Sports Centre	2008 (Delisle) 2025 (Martensville)
Prince Albert Timberjaks	Prince Albert	Northern Regional Recreation Centre (Buckland)	2023
Saskatoon Quakers	Saskatoon	Harold Latrace/Rod Hamm Arena	2007
Saskatoon Royals	Saskatoon	Harold Latrace/Rod Hamm Arena	2007
Saskatoon Westleys	Saskatoon	Harold Latrace/Rod Hamm Arena	2007
Bill Johnston (South Division)
Team	City	Arena	Joined PJHL/SSJHL
Assiniboia Southern Rebels	Assiniboia	Southland Co-op Centre	1992
Fort Knox	Fort Qu'Appelle	Prairie Co-op Rexentre	1996
Pilot Butte Storm	Pilot Butte	Pilot Butte Recreation Centre	1993
Regina Capitals	Regina	Al Ritchie Arena	1992
Regina Silver Foxes	Regina	Doug Wickenheiser Arena	2013

a - relocate from Delisle

=== Franchise history ===
Former member Current member

- Assiniboia Southern Rebels (1992–present)
- Briercrest College Clippers (1992–96) → joined the ACAC
- Moose Jaw Canucks (1992–94)
- Notre Dame Hounds (1992–94, 2003–05)
- Regina Capitals (1992–present)
- Regina Express (1993–98) → Pilot Butte Express (1998–2001) → Pilot Butte Storm (2001–present)
- Grenfell Spitfires (1994–96) → Grenfell Storm (1996–2000)
- Canora Cobras (1995–2001)
- Delilse Chiefs (2008-2025) → Martensville Chiefs (2025-present)
- Fort Knox (1996–present)
- St. Phillips Rangers (1996–2003) → Moose Mountain Rangers (2003–07)
- Tri-Town Thunder (2005–16) → Carrot River Outback Thunder (2016–present)
- Cypress Cyclones (2005–14)
- Saskatoon Quakers (2007–present; joined from NSJHL)
- Saskatoon Royals (2007–present; joined from NSJHL)
- Saskatoon Westleys (2007–present; joined from NSJHL)
- Ochapowace Thunder (2008–16)
- Prince Albert Ice Hawks (2008–16) → Prince Albert Titans (2016–21)
- West Central Rage (2009–21)
- Regina Silver Foxes (2013–present)
- Whitefish Flyers (2023) announced but never fielded team
- Moosomin Steelhawks (2025–26)

== Champions ==
SSJHL and PJHL Champions Defunct teams not included.
Team	Titles
Assiniboia Southern Rebels	7
Pilot Butte Storm	6
Saskatoon Quakers	5
Regina Capitals	3
Saskatoon Royals	2
Carrot River Outback Thunder	1
Fort Knox	1
Saskatoon Westleys	1

To see the champions for the North Saskatchewan Junior Hockey League before 2007, see North Saskatchewan Junior B Hockey League

To see the full list of champions of the Athol Murray Trophy, see Athol Murray Trophy

Season	SSJHL / PJHL Playoff champion	Runner-up	Result	Keystone Cup / Central Canada Cup finish
1992–93	Assiniboia Southern Rebels	Regina Capitals		
1993–94	Notre Dame Hounds	Moose Jaw Canucks		
1994–95	Regina Capitals	Grenfell Spitfires		
1995–96	Assiniboia Southern Rebels	Regina Capitals		Gold medalist
1996–97	Grenfell Storm	Briercrest Clippers		Gold medalist
1997–98	St. Phillips Rangers	Regina Capitals		
1998–99	Assiniboia Southern Rebels	Regina Capitals		
1999–00	Assiniboia Southern Rebels	Fort Knox		
2000–01	Assiniboia Southern Rebels	St. Phillips Rangers		Gold medalist
2001–02	Assiniboia Southern Rebels	St. Phillips Rangers	4-0 (best-of 7)	
2002–03	Assiniboia Southern Rebels	Regina Capitals	4-1 (best-of 7)	Gold medalist
2003–04	Regina Capitals			Gold medalist
2004–05	Pilot Butte Storm	Fort Knox	4-3 (best-of 7)	DNQ
2005–06	Regina Capitals	Pilot Butte Storm	4-1 (best-of 7)	DNQ
2006–07	Pilot Butte Storm	Fort Knox	4-1 (best-of 7)	Fort Knox (host) - Silver medalist
2007–08	Pilot Butte Storm	Saskatoon Royals	4-2 (best-of 7)	5th
2008–09	Saskatoon Royals	Pilot Butte Storm	4-1 (best-of 7)	4th
2009–10	Tri-Town Thunder	Pilot Butte Storm	4-3 (best-of 7)	Silver medalist
2010–11	Pilot Butte Storm	Saskatoon Royals	4-3 (best-of 7)	Bronze medalist
2011–12	Pilot Butte Storm	Delisle Chiefs	4-1 (best-of 7)	Pilot Butte Storm — 6th Saskatoon Royals (host) — 4th
2012–13	Saskatoon Royals	Pilot Butte Storm	4-1 (best-of 7)	Silver medalist
2013–14	Saskatoon Quakers	Pilot Butte Storm	4-3 (best-of 7)	5th
2014–15	Saskatoon Quakers	Pilot Butte Storm	4-0 (best-of 7)	Bronze medalist
2015–16	Saskatoon Quakers	Regina Capitals	4-0 (best-of 7)	Saskatoon Quakers — Silver medalist Regina Capitals (host) - 4th
2016–17	Regina Capitals	Saskatoon Quakers	4-2 (best-of 7)	Bronze medalist
2017–18	Regina Capitals	Delisle Chiefs	4-1 (best-of 7)	Sask did not send rep
2018–19	Regina Capitals	Saskatoon Quakers	4-0 (best-of 7)	Sask did not send rep
2019–20	none (COVID-19 pandemic)	---	---	---
2020–21	none (COVID-19 pandemic)	---	---	---
2021–22	Saskatoon Quakers	Pilot Butte Storm	4-1 (best-of 7)	Sask did not send rep
2022–23	Pilot Butte Storm	Saskatoon Quakers	4-3 (best-of 7)	Sask did not send rep
2023–24	Saskatoon Quakers	Regina Capitals	4-1 (best-of 7)	Saskatoon Royals — Silver medalist
2024–25	Fort Knox	Saskatoon Westleys	4-2 (best-of 7)	Saskatoon Royals — Bronze medalist
2025–26	Saskatoon Westleys	Regina Capitals	4-2 (best-of 7)	Regina Capitals — Bronze medalist Saskatoon Royals (host) — 4th

== See also ==
- Ice hockey in Saskatchewan
