= St. Paul Canadiens =

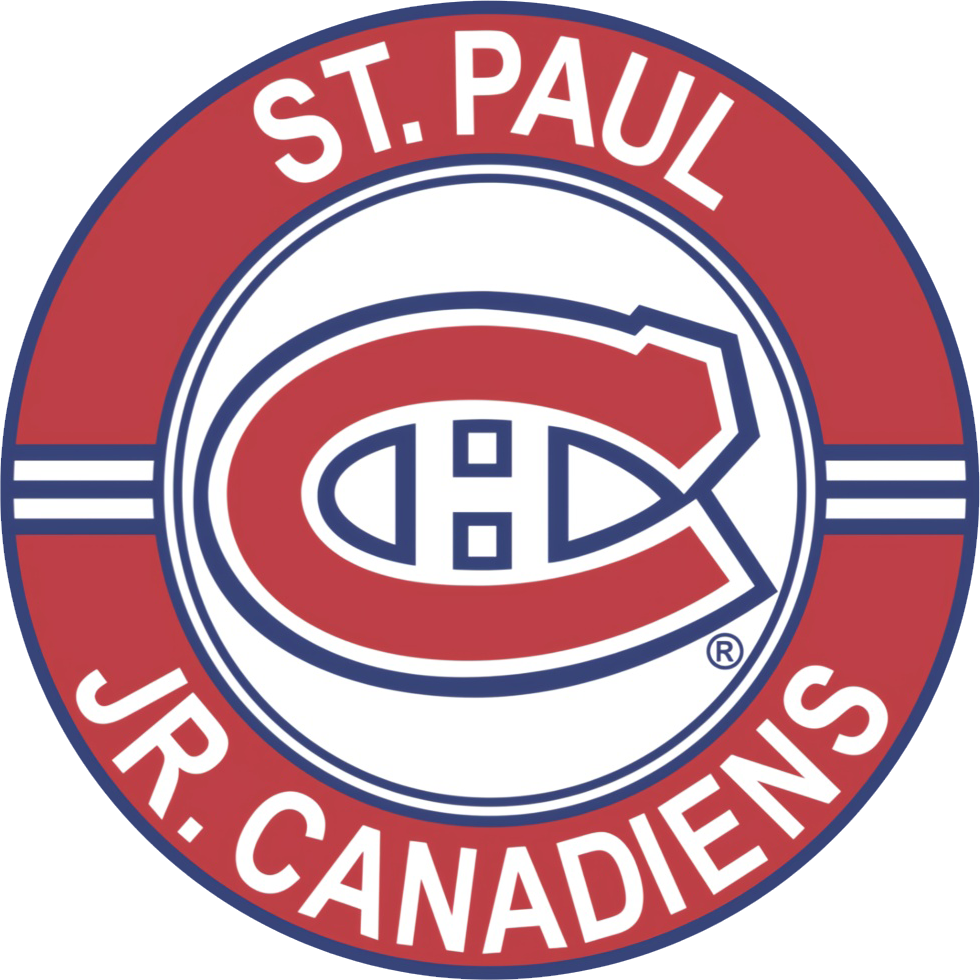
- City: St. Paul, Alberta, Canada
- League: North Eastern Alberta Junior B Hockey League
- Founded: 1954
- Home arena: Clancy Richard Arena
- Colours: Red, white, blue
- General manager: Dean Smyl, 2022–present
- Head coach: Corey DeMoissac, 2022–present
- Website: www.stpaulcanadiens.com

Franchise history
- 1954–present: St. Paul Canadiens

The St. Paul Canadiens are a junior "B" ice hockey team based in St. Paul, Alberta, Canada. They were founded in 1953 as the St. Paul Chevrolets. In 1954 Clarence (Clancy) Richard formed the St.Paul Junior B Canadiens. They are members of the North Eastern Alberta Junior B Hockey League (NEAJBHL). As a Western Canadian Junior B franchise, the Canadiens are eligible for the Keystone Cup.

The Canadiens' organization hosted the 2017 Russ Barnes Provincial Championships.

In 2022 the Canadiens qualified to the Russ Barnes Provincial Championships as the North Eastern Alberta Junior B Hockey League playoff runner up. For the second time they finished in third place of pool play and did not advance in to the Russ Barnes playoff round.

== Season-by-season record ==
Note: GP = Games played, W = Wins, L = Losses, OTL = Overtime Losses, Pts = Points, GF = Goals for, GA = Goals against, PIM = Penalties in minutes

Season	GP	W	L	OTL	Pts	GF	GA	PIM	Finish	Playoffs
2010–11	32	2	29	1	5	40	284	511	9th, NEAJBHL	Did not qualify
2011–12	32	3	28	2	8	74	327	—	9th, NEAJBHL	Did not qualify
2012–13	34	3	30	1	7	67	241	—	8th, NEAJBHL	Lost Quarterfinals, 0–4, (Ice)
2013–14	34	14	19	1	29	120	167	—	7th, NEAJBHL	Lost Quarterfinals, 0–4, (Bisons)
2014–15	36	23	11	2	48	211	127	1221	4th, NEAJBHL	Lost Quarterfinals, 3–4, (Bandits)
2015–16	36	24	11	1	49	175	120	1483	3rd of 10, NEAJBHL	Won Quarterfinals, 4–1, (Rangers); Lost Semifinals, 0–4 (Wheat Kings)
2016–17	36	29	5	2	60	184	86	1154	2nd of 10, NEAJBHL	Won Quarterfinals, 4–1, (Border Chiefs); Won Semifinals, 4–2 (T-Birds); Lost League Finals, 0–4 (Bisons)
2017–18	36	21	12	3	45	143	109	1060	3rd of 10, NEAJBHL	Lost Quarterfinals, 3–4 (Ice)
2018–19	32	20	11	1	41	138	110	897	4th of 9, NEAJBHL	Won Quarterfinals, 4–2, (Ice); Lost Semifinals, 1–4 (Bisons)
2019–20	32	20	8	4	44	143	120	735	3rd of 8, NEAJBHL	Won Quarterfinals, 4–0 (Bandits); Won Semifinals 4–2 (Bisons) incomplete finals 0–0 (Clippers) remaining playoffs cancelled – COVID-19
2020–21	4	1	3	0	2	14	16	76	Remaining season cancelled – COVID-19	
2021–22	34	24	7	3	51	150	101	1018	2nd of 7, NEAJBHL	Won Semifinals 4–2 (Bandits); Won Semifinals 4–2 (Wheat Kings); Lost finals 0–4 (Bisons); As runner up advance to Provincials
2022–23	31	22	7	2	46	160	75	964	4th of 8, NEAJBHL	Won Quarterfinals, 4–1 (Bandits); Won Semifinals 4–2 (Tigers); Lost finals 1–4 (Bisons)
2023–24	31	27	4	0	54	210	60	x	1st of 8, NEAJBHL	Won Quarterfinals, 4–0 (Border Chiefs) won semifinals 4–0(Tigers); Lost Finals 1–4 bison 4–1 (Bisons)St. Paul selected to Central Canadian Cup
2024–25	35	21	12	2	42	160	106	836	4th of 8, NEAJBHL	Won Quarterfinals, 4–0 (Ice) won Semifinals 2–4 (Bisons)
2025–26	36	16	18	2	36	126	144	x	4th of 7, NEAJBHL	Lost Quarterfinals, 0-3 (Wheat Kings)

== Russ Barnes Trophy ==
Alberta Jr. B Provincial Championships

Year	Round-robin	Record	Place	Semifinal	Bronze medal game	Gold medal game
2017; Host	L, Red Deer Vipers, 2–4; L, CBHA Rangers, 3–7; W, Wetaskiwin Icemen, 7–5	1–2–0	3rd of 4, Pool	Did not advance	—	—
2022	T, Beaumont Chiefs, 4–4; L, Cochrane Generals, 4–5; L, Fort St. John Huskies, 3–5	0–2–1	3rd of 4, Pool	Did not advance	—	—

== CENTRAL CANADA CUP formerly Keystone Cup ==
Western Canadian Jr. B Championships (Northern Ontario to Alberta)

Year	Round-robin	Record	Standing	Semifinal Game	Gold Medal Game
2024	W, Peguis Juniors, 5–2; W, Current River Storm, 6–3; W, PBCN Selects, 7–0; W, Saskatoon Royals, 7–5	4–0–0	1st of 5	Won – 4–1; PBCN Selects	Won – 3–1; Saskatoon Royals; CENTRAL CANADA CUP CHAMPS
2025; HOST	W, OCN Storm, 6–3; W, Current River Storm, 4–0; L, Saskatoon Royals, 5–6; T, Wetaskiwin Icemen, 3–3	2–1–1	2nd of 5	Won – 5–4; Saskatoon Royals	Won – 3–2; Wetaskiwin Icemen; CENTRAL CANADA CUP CHAMPS
