= Killam Wheat Kings =

- City: Killam, Alberta, Canada
- League: NEAJBHL
- Home arena: Killam Agriplex
- Colours: Green, gold
- General manager: (Canada) Murray Gaume
- Head coach: (Canada) Bob Charchun

Franchise history
- 1981–present: Killam Wheat Kings

The Killam Wheat Kings are a junior "B" ice hockey team based in Killam, Alberta, Canada. They are members of the North Eastern Alberta Junior B Hockey League (NEAJBHL). They play their home games at Killam Agriplex.

== History ==
In 2012, the Killam Wheat Kings were selected to be the host of the Russ Barnes Trophy Championships. As host they were guaranteed a spot in the Provincial Championships and an opportunity to earn their way to the Keystone Cup to battle for the Western Canada Junior B Championships.

== Season-by-season record ==
Note: GP = Games played, W = Wins, L = Losses, OTL = Overtime Losses, Pts = Points, GF = Goals for, GA = Goals against, PIM = Penalties in minutes

Season	GP	W	L	OTL	Pts	GF	GA	PIM	Finish	Playoffs
2010–11	31	18	11	2	38	220	130	853	5th, NEAJBHL	Lost in Quarterfinals, 1–3 (Bisons)
2011–12	32	18	14	0	36	195	138	—	5th, NEAJBHL	Lost in Finals, 0–4 (Ice) advance to Provincials
2012–13	34	19	13	2	40	162	128	—	3rd, NEAJBHL	Lost in Semifinals, 0–4 (Bisons)
2013–14	34	14	15	5	33	124	134	—	4th, NEAJBHL	Lost in Quarterfinals, 0–4 (Warriors)
2014–15	36	22	6	8	51	166	132	1189	3rd, NEAJBHL	Won Quarterfinals, 4–0 (Rangers); Lost Semifinals, 0–4 (Ice)
2015–16	17	14	2	1	29	103	50	1479	2nd of 10; NEAJBHL	Won Quarterfinals, 4–0 (T-Birds); Won Semifinals, 4–0 (Canadiens); Lost League Finals, 1–4 (Bisons)
2016–17	36	21	14	1	181	140	43	1479	4th of 10; NEAJBHL	Won Quarterfinals, 4–0 (Ice); Lost Semifinals, 2–4 (Bisons)
2017–18	36	25	10	1	51	198	118	1170	2nd of 10; NEAJBHL	Won Quarterfinals, 4–1 (Bandits); Lost Semifinals, 2–4 (T-Birds)
2018–19	32	21	7	4	52	167	134	1110	3rd of 9 NEAJBHL	Won Quarterfinals, 4–1 (Bandits); Lost Semifinals, 1–4 (Clippers)
2019–20	32	14	13	5	33	144	147	746	4th of 8 NEAJBHL	Lost Quarterfinals, 2–4 (Ice)
2020–21	2	2	0	0	4	12	5	94	Remaining Season Cancelled – COVID-19	
2021–22	34	22	11	4	45	145	96	914	3rd of 7 NEAJBHL	Won Quarterfinals, 4–0 (Bandits); Lost Semifinals 2–4 (Canadiens)
2022–23	31	23	8	0	46	149	68	898	3rd of 8 NEAJBHL	Won Quarterfinals, 3–0 (Ice); Lost Semifinals, 2–4 (Bisons)
2023–24	31	13	17	1	27	118	137	x	5th of 8 NEAJBHL	Lost Quarterfinals, 0–4 (Tigers)
2024–25	35	9	36	0	18	141	174	1095	7th of 8 NEAJBHL	Won Quarterfinals, 3-0 (Canadiens); Lost Semifinals 4-0 (Bandits)
2025–26	36	13	24	2	26	146	164	x	5th of 7 NEAJBHL	Lost Quarterfinals, 0–4 (Tigers)

== Russ Barnes Trophy ==
Alberta Jr. B Provincial Championships

Year	Round Robin	Record	Standing	SemiFinal	Bronze Medal Game	Gold Medal Game
2012	L, Spruce Grove Regals, 2–9; L, Whitecourt Wolervines, 2–3; L, Okotoks Bisons, 0–6	0–3–0	4th of 4, Pool B	—	—	—
2016*	T, North Edmonton Red Wings 4–4; T, North Peace Navigators, 4–4; L, Red Deer Vipers, 2–3	0–1–2	4th of 4, Pool	—	—	—

* — Heritage League had two representatives with Red Deer being host, NEAJBL given second team.

== NHL alumni ==
- Shane Doan
- Kyle Freadrich
- Bill Peters

== Awards and trophies ==
Top Scorer

- Shayne Andres: 2010–11

== See also ==
- List of ice hockey teams in Alberta
