= North Eastern Alberta Junior B Hockey League =

Canadian sports league

North Eastern Alberta Junior B Hockey League (NEAJBHL)
- Formerly: CAJBHL North Division
- Sport: Ice Hockey
- Founded: 1990
- First season: 1990-91
- President: Keith Wilkinson Vice President-Lisa Davies
- Country: Canada
- Headquarters: Kitscoty, AB
- Continent: North America
- Most recent champion: Lloydminster Bandits (2025-26)
- Most titles: Lloydminster Bandits (15)
- Website: www.neajbhl.ca

The North Eastern Alberta Junior B Hockey League is a Junior "B" ice hockey league in Alberta and Saskatchewan, Canada, sanctioned by Hockey Canada.

League champions advance to the Hockey Alberta Provincials to face off against the winners of the other Alberta "B" leagues in the Russ Barnes Trophy. The Provincial winner earns the chance to compete for the Western Canadian Junior "B" championship, the Keystone Cup. However, this perk was removed 2017. The NEAJBHL elected to send a representative for the 2024 tournament, now called the Central Canada Cup. The return to the Cup proved successful as the St. Paul Canadians were champions. The victory earned them the opportunity to host the 2025 tournament. St. Paul proceeded to make it back to back Central Canada Cup Champions.

== Teams ==
Team	City	Arena	Founded
Cold Lake Ice	Cold Lake, Alberta	Imperial Oil Place	2001
Killam Wheat Kings	Killam, Alberta	Killam Agriplex	
Lloydminster Bandits	Lloydminster, Saskatchewan	Centennial Civic Centre	
St. Paul Canadiens	St. Paul, Alberta	Clancy Richards Arena	
Vegreville Rangers	Vegreville, Alberta	Vegreville Recreation Centre	1974
Vermilion Tigers	Vermilion, Alberta	Vermilion Stadium	
Wainwright Bisons	Wainwright, Alberta	Peace Memorial Multiplex	

== Champions ==
Year	Winning team	Runner-up	Result
1991	Lloydminster Bandits	Bonnyville Jr B Sabres	4–2
1992	Lloydminster Bandits	Wetaskiwin Icemen	4–2
1993	Lloydminster Bandits	Wetaskiwin Icemen	4–1
1994	Lloydminster Bandits		
1995	Lloydminster Bandits		
1996	Lloydminster Bandits		
1997	Lloydminster Bandits		
1998	Lloydminster Bandits		
1999	Lloydminster Bandits		
2000	Saddle Lake Warriors	Lloydminster Bandits	4–2
2001	Wainwright Bisons		
2002	Lloydminster Bandits	Wainwright Bisons	4–3
2003	Lloydminster Bandits		
2004	Lloydminster Bandits		
2005	Vegreville Rangers		
2006	Saddle Lake Warriors		
2007	Saddle Lake Warriors		
2008	Vermilion Tigers	Lloydminster Bandits	4–1
2009	Lloydminster Bandits		
2010	Lloydminster Bandits		
2011	Cold Lake Ice	Lloydminster Bandits	4–0
2012	Cold Lake Ice	Killam Wheat Kings	4–0
2013	Cold Lake Ice	Wainwright Bisons	4–1
2014	Cold Lake Ice	Wainwright Bisons	4–2
2015	Cold Lake Ice	Wainwright Bisons	4–2
2016	Wainwright Bisons	Killam Wheat Kings	4–1
2017	Wainwright Bisons	St. Paul Canadiens	4–0
2018	Wainwright Bisons	Frog Lake T-Birds	4–1
2019	Wainwright Bisons	Lac La Biche Clippers	4–0
2022	Wainwright Bisons		
2023	Wainwright Bisons		
2024	Wainwright Bisons	Vermilion Tigers	4–2
2025	Wainwright Bisons	Lloydminster Bandits	4–2
2026	Lloydminster Bandits	Vermilion Tigers	4–0

== Former teams ==
- Frog Lake T-Birds (2014–2019)
- Lac La Biche Clippers (1995–2000) returned (2017–2019)
- Onion Lake Border Chiefs (2014–2018)(2023–2025)
- Saddle Lake Warriors (1991–2017)
- Thorhild Titans (2009–2012)

== NHL alumni ==
- Shane Doan
- Kyle Freadrich
- Rich Healey
- Shawn Heins
- Gordon Mark
- Glen Sather
- Brent Severyn
- Lance Ward
- Jeff Woywitka
- Miles Zaharko
- Wade Redden
- Mark Letestu

== See also ==
- List of ice hockey teams in Alberta
