= Terry Ewasiuk =

Canadian ice hockey player and coach

- Born: October 26, 1953 (age 72) Smoky Lake, Alberta, Canada
- Height: 6 ft 2 in (188 cm)
- Weight: 200 lb (91 kg; 14 st 4 lb)
- Position: Left wing
- Shot: Left
- Played for: AHL; Hershey Bears; Baltimore Clippers; Springfield Indians; IHL; Saginaw Gears (IHL); Fort Wayne Komets
- NHL draft: 103rd overall, 1973; Pittsburgh Penguins
- WHA draft: 40th overall, 1973; Chicago Cougars
- Playing career: 1973–1978

Terry Ewasiuk (born October 26, 1953) is a Canadian former professional ice hockey player. He was selected by the Pittsburgh Penguins in the 7th round (103rd overall) of the 1973 NHL Amateur Draft, and was also drafted by the Chicago Cougars in the 4th round (40th overall) of the 1973 WHA Amateur Draft. Ewasiuk is currently the head coach for the Saddle Lake Warriors of the North Eastern Alberta Junior B Hockey League.

== Playing career ==
Ewasiuk began his professional career with the Hershey Bears, playing the 1973–74 and 1974–75 seasons with the American Hockey League (AHL) team. He split the 1975–76 season between the Saginaw Gears of the International Hockey League (IHL), and the Baltimore Clippers and Springfield Indians of the AHL. Ewasiuk skated the next two seasons with the Fort Wayne Komets of the IHL before retiring as a player following the 1977–78 campaign.

== Coaching career ==
Ewasiuk served three years as head coach in the Alberta Junior Hockey League (AJHL) with the Fort Saskatchewan Traders and the Sherwood Park Crusaders before becoming head coach of the Grant MacEwan College men's ice hockey team. In the college ranks, Ewasiuk spent six seasons as head coach with the Grant MacEwan Griffins and seven as the head coach of the Portage College Voyageurs. On September 3, 2013, Ewasiuk was brought in as the head coach of the Saddle Lake Warriors in the North Eastern Alberta Junior B Hockey League.

== Personal ==
His son Jay (born August 2, 1980) was drafted by the Moose Jaw Warriors in the 3rd round (45th overall) 1995 WHL Bantam Draft. Terry was of Ukrainian origin.

== Career statistics ==
			Regular season					Playoffs
Season	Team	League	GP	G	A	Pts	PIM	GP	G	A	Pts	PIM
1971–72	Edmonton Movers	AJHL	47	35	18	53	104	—	—	—	—	—
1972–73	Victoria Cougars	WCHL	67	28	26	54	139	—	—	—	—	—
1973–74	Hershey Bears	AHL	71	14	23	37	117	14	5	2	7	26
1974–75	Hershey Bears	AHL	63	10	24	34	99	12	2	3	5	11
1975–76	Baltimore Clippers	AHL	16	3	2	5	11	—	—	—	—	—
1975–76	Springfield Indians	AHL	17	0	2	2	10	—	—	—	—	—
1975–76	Saginaw Gears	IHL	40	7	23	30	72	7	2	2	4	6
1976–77	Fort Wayne Komets	IHL	54	7	18	25	137	9	1	5	6	14
1977–78	Fort Wayne Komets	IHL	75	11	20	31	78	11	1	2	3	60
AHL totals			167	27	51	78	237	26	7	5	12	37
IHL totals			169	25	61	86	287	27	4	9	13	80
