= Saddle Lake Warriors =

- City: Saddle Lake, Alberta, Canada
- League: North Eastern Alberta Junior B Hockey League
- Home arena: Manitou Kihew Arena
- Colours: Red, Black, White
- General manager: (Canada) Billy Steinhauer
- Head coach: (Canada) Dallas Jackson (2014-15)
- Website: www.neajbhlhockey.com/warriors

Franchise history
- 1991-present: Saddle Lake Warriors

The Saddle Lake Warriors are a Junior "B" Ice Hockey team based in Saddle Lake, Alberta, Canada. They are members of the North Eastern Alberta Junior B Hockey League (NEAJBHL). They play their home games at Manitou Kihew Arena.

== Season-by-season record ==
Note: GP = Games played, W = Wins, L = Losses, OTL = Overtime Losses, Pts = Points, GF = Goals for, GA = Goals against, PIM = Penalties in minutes

Season	GP	W	L	OTL	Pts	GF	GA	PIM	Finish	Playoffs
2010-11	32	9	19	4	22	137	195	812	7th, NEAJBHL	Lost in Quarterfinals, 0-3 (Bandits)
2011-12	32	6	26	0	12	105	277	-	8th, NEAJBHL	Lost in Quarterfinals, 0-3 (Rangers)
2012-13	34	10	23	1	21	116	194	-	7th, NEAJBHL	Lost in Quarterfinals, 0-4 (Bisons)
2013-14	34	15	19	0	30	153	174	-	5th, NEAJBHL	Won in Quarterfinals, 4-0 (Wheat Kings); Lost in Semifinals, 1-4 (Ice)
2014-15	36	2	34	0	4	60	296	-	10th, NEAJBHL	did not qualify
2015-16	36	3	31	2	8	72	218	810	10th of 10, NEAJBHL	did not qualify
2016-17	36	5	31	0	10	92	235	1248	10th of 10, NEAJBHL	did not qualify
2017-18	Suspended after 28 games - all statistics removed									

== See also ==
- List of ice hockey teams in Alberta
