= Wainwright Bisons =

- City: Wainwright, Alberta, Canada
- League: North Eastern Alberta Junior B Hockey League
- Home arena: Peace Memorial Multiplex
- Colours: Orange, Metallic Gold, Cream, black, white
- General manager: (Canada) Adam Huxley
- Head coach: (Canada) Connor James

Franchise history
- 1974–present: Wainwright Bisons

The Wainwright Bisons are a junior "B" ice hockey team based in Wainwright, Alberta, Canada. They are members of the North Eastern Alberta Junior B Hockey League (NEAJBHL). They play their home games at Peace Memorial Multiplex.

== History ==
Since the 1990–91 season the Wainwright Bison have three league championships winning in the 2001, 2016 and 2017 playoffs. The victory advanced the Bison to the Russ Barnes Trophy championships which is the Alberta Provincial Jr. B Championships featuring eight teams. The Heritage and Capital Hockey leagues qualify their playoff champion and playoff finalist, while the Calgary Jr. B, North West, and the North East Hockey leagues send just their playoff champions. The final team is the team selected to host the tournament event.

In 2013, Wainwright was the Russ Barnes host and as such participated in their second Provincial Championship. In 2016, the Bisons advanced to the Provincial Championship but as the league champion. In 2017, the team won the league championship to advance and win the Russ Barnes Trophy and advanced to the Keystone Cup. Here they won the Western Canadian Junior B Championship with an overtime win in the final game.

The Bisons won their fourth consecutive title in 2025.

== Season-by-season record ==
Note: GP = Games played, W = Wins, L = Losses, OTL = Overtime Losses, Pts = Points, GF = Goals for, GA = Goals against, PIM = Penalties in minutes

Season	GP	W	L	OTL	Pts	GF	GA	PIM	Finish	Playoffs
2010–11	32	18	11	3	39	192	140	813	4th, NEAJBHL	Won Quarterfinals, 3–1 (Wheat Kings); Lost Semifinals, 0–4 (Ice)
2011–12	32	18	14	0	36	195	138	—	5th, NEAJBHL	Lost Quarterfinals, 1–3 (Wheat Kings)
2012–13	34	26	6	2	54	142	77	—	2nd, NEAJBHL	Won Quarterfinals, 4–0 (Tigers); Won Semifinals, 4–0 (Wheat Kings); Lost League Finals, 1–4 (Ice)
2013–14	34	28	6	0	56	195	94	—	2nd, NEAJBHL	Won Quarterfinals, 4–0 (Canadiens); Won Semifinals, 4–2 (Bandits); Lost League Finals, 2–4 (Ice)
2014–15	36	33	2	1	67	235	89	727	1st, NEAJBHL	Won Quarterfinals, 4–0 (Border Chiefs); Won Semifinals, 4–0 (Bandits); Lost League Finals, 2–4 (Ice)
2015–16	36	28	6	2	58	179	100	1034	1st of 10; NEAJBHL	Won Quarterfinals, 4–0 (Bandits); Won Semifinals, 4–0 (Ice); Won League Finals, 4–1 (Wheat Kings); NEAJBL Champions
2016–17	36	32	4	0	64	220	95	1133	1st of 10; NEAJBHL	Won Quarterfinals, 4–0 (Tigers); Won Semifinals, 4–2 (Wheat Kings); Won League Finals, 4–0 (Canadiens); NEAJBL Champions
2017–18	36	34	2	0	68	224	73	911	1st of 10; NEAJBHL	Won Quarterfinals, 4–0 (Tigers); Won Semifinals, 4–0 (Ice); Won League Finals, 4–1 (T-Birds); NEAJBL Champions
2018–19	32	29	3	0	58	218	65	882	1st of 9 NEAJBHL	Won Quarterfinals, 4–0 (T-Birds); Won Semifinals, 4–1 (Canadiens); Won League Finals, 4–0 (Clippers); NEAJBL Champions
2019–20	32	23	6	3	49	145	107	35	2nd of 8 NEAJBHL	Won Quarterfinals, 4–0 (Tigers); Loist Semifinals, 2–4 (Canadiens)
2020–21	4	3	1	0	6	22	12	79	Remaining Season Cancelled – COVID-19	
2021–22	33	26	6	1	53	136	84	866	1st of 7 NEAJBHL	Won Semifinals, 4–0 (Wheat Kings); Won League Finals, 4–0 (Canadiens); NEAJBL Champions
2022–23	31	23	7	1	47	166	72	530	2nd of 8 NEAJBHL	Won Quarterfinals, 4–0 (Border Chiefs); Won Semifinals, 4–2 (Wheat Kings); Won League Finals, 4–1 (Canadiens); NEAJBL Champions
2023–24	31	26	5	0	52	197	76	x	2nd of 8 NEAJBHL	Won Quarterfinals, 4–0 (Rangers); Won Semifinals, 4–2 (Bandits); Won League Finals 4–2 (Tigers); NEAJBL Champions
2024–25	35	29	5	1	58	228	77	750	1st of 8 NEAJBHL	Quarterfinals bye Won Semifinals, 4–2 (Canadiens); Won League Finals, 4–2 (Bandits); NEAJBL Champions
2025–26	36	25	6	5	50	147	83	x	3rd of 8 NEAJBHL	Won Quarterfinals, 3–0 (Ice); Lost Semifinals, 1-4 (Tigers)

== Russ Barnes Trophy ==
Alberta Jr. B Provincial Championships

Year	Round-robin	Record	Place	Semifinal	Bronze medal game	Gold medal game
2001	W, Fort St. John Huskies, 5–3; W, Edmonton River Kings, 6–4; W, Calgary Royals Blue, 4–2	3–0–0	1st of 4, Pool	Lost, 1–8; Edmonton Royals	Not played	—
2013	T, Okotoks Bisons, 2–2; T, Calgary Rangers, 1–1; L, Sherwood Park Knights, 2–5	0–1–2	4th of 4, Pool	Did not advance		
2016	L, CRAA Gold, 3–4; W, Mountainview Colts, 2–1; W, Wetaskiwin Icemen, 7–1	2–1–0	1st of 4, Pool	Won, 3–1; Red Deer Vipers	—	Lost 2–3; North Peace Navigators; Silver Medal
2017	W, Fairview Flyers, 7–3; W, Beaumont Chiefs, 11–2; L, Cochrane Generals, 3–4	2–1–0	1st of 4, Pool	Won, 5–2; Wetaskiwin Icemen	—	Won, 5–4; Cochrane Generals; Gold Medal
2018	W, Wetaskiwin Icemen, 5–0; W, Fort St. John Huskies, 5–3; T, Coaldale Copperheads, 1–1	2–0–1	1st of 4, Pool B	Won, 4–3; Beverly Warriors	—	Won, 5–1 Red Deer Vipers; Gold Medal
2019	W, Fort St. John Huskies, 6–4; W, Wetaskiwin Icemen, 7–4; W, Coaldale Copperheads, 5–3	3–0–0	1st of 4, Pool	Won, 7–2; Beverly Warriors	—	Lost, 3–4 Airdrie Thunder; Silver Medal
2022	L, Okotoks Bisons, 0–4; L, CBHA Rangers, 5–8; W, Sherwood Park Knights, 4–2	1–2–0	4th of 4, Pool B	did not qualify	—	-
2023	W, Sylvan Lake Wranglers, 2–1; L, CBHA Rangers, 0–2; W, Fort St. John Huskies, 5–0; W, Okotoks Bisons, 5–4	2–2–0	2nd of 6, Full	—	—	Won, 3–1; Okotoks Bisons; Gold Medal
2024	W, NWCAA Stampeders, 5–3; W, St. Albert Merchants, 4–0; L, La Crete Lumber Barons, 1–3; L, Okotoks Bisons, 3–4	2–1–1	3rd of 6, Full	—	Lost 5–6; St. Albert Merchants	
2025	OTL, Sylvan Lake Wranglers, 2–3; W, Morinville Jets, 6–1; W, Fort St. John Huskies, 3–2; 4, NWCAA Stampeders, 5–1	3–0–0–1	1st of 6 Full	no playoffs	–	Lost 3–4; Morinville Jets; Silver Medal

== Keystone Cup ==
Western Canadian Jr. B Championships (Northern Ontario to British Columbia)
Six teams in round-robin play. 1st vs. 2nd for gold/silver & 3rd vs. 4th for bronze.

Year	Round-robin	Record	Standing	Bronze medal game	Gold medal game
2017	T, Beaver Valley Nitehawks, 3–3; W, Nipigon Elks, 9–2; W, Arborg Ice Dawgs, 5–0; T, Peguis Juniors, 4–4; W, Regina Capitals, 2–1	3–0–2	2nd of 6	—	W, Beaver Valley Nitehawks, 4–3 OT; Keystone Cup Champions
2018	Alberta elected not to send Keystone Cup representative				

== NHL alumni ==
- Shawn Heins
- Gord Mark
- Jeff Woywitka

Preceded by 100 Mile House Wranglers	Keystone Cup Champions; 2017	Succeeded by Thunder Bay Northern Hawks
