= Russ Barnes Trophy =

- Sport: Ice hockey
- Competition: Hockey Alberta Junior B
- Awarded for: Alberta Junior B championship
- Country: Canada

The Russ Barnes Trophy is a trophy awarded by Hockey Alberta to the Alberta Junior B Provincial champion. The gold medallist advances to the Keystone Cup Western Canada Junior B championship.

== Tournament organization ==
Eight teams compete in the Alberta Junior B Provincials. The two largest leagues (Capital Junior Hockey League, Heritage Junior B Hockey League) send two teams each, the remaining three send one, while the host team is guaranteed a berth.

Starting with the 2023 championships the format was revised such that only the league playoff champion is to advance plus the host city team.

Leagues:

- Calgary Junior Hockey League
- Capital Junior Hockey League
- Heritage Junior B Hockey League
- North Eastern Alberta Junior B Hockey League
- Northwest Junior Hockey League

== Champions ==
Russ Barnes Trophy champions
Year	Gold	Silver	Bronze	Host city
1970	Calgary Oilers (CalJHL)			
1971	St. Paul Canadiens (NEAJBHL)			
1972	Calgary Totems (CalJHL)			
1973	University of Alberta Bearcats (CapJHL)			
1974	Vermilion Tigers (NEAJBHL)			
1975				
1976	Grande Prairie North Stars (PJBHL)			
1977	Lloydminster Bandits (NEAJBHL)			
1978				
1979	NWZ Allied Auto Parts (Edmonton) (CapJHL)			
1980	Barrhead Jr. Elks (CapJHL)			
1981	Leduc Sparrow Riggers (CapJHL)			
1982	Calgary Trojan Bruins (CalJHL)			
1983	Fort Saskatchewan Jr. B Traders (CapJHL)			
1984	Lethbridge Y's Men Native Suns (HJHL)			
1985	Edmonton Warriors (CapJHL)			
1986	St. Albert Merchants (CapJHL)			
1987	**NWCAA Bruins (CalJHL)**			
1988	North Edmonton Red Wings (CapJHL)			
1989	Stony Plain Flyers (CapJHL)			
1990	NWCAA Bruins (CalJHL)			
1991	Lloydminster Bandits (NEAJBHL)			
1992	Leduc Riggers (CapJHL)			
1993	**Lloydminster Bandits (NEAJBHL)**			
1994	Sherwood Park Knights (CapJHL)			
1995	**Lloydminster Bandits (NEAJBHL)**			
1996	St. Albert Merchants (CapJHL)			
1997	Lloydminster Bandits (NEAJBHL)			
1998	Lloydminster Bandits (NEAJBHL)	St. Albert Merchants (CapJHL)	N/A	Vermilion, AB
1999	Edmonton Royals (CapJHL)	Lloydminster Bandits (NEAJBHL)	N/A	Medicine Hat, AB
2000	**Edmonton River Kings** (CapJHL)	CRAA Gold (CalJHL)	N/A	Calgary, AB
2001	Edmonton Royals (CapJHL)	Foothills Bisons (HJHL)	N/A	Dawson Creek, BC
2002	Spruce Grove Regals (CapJHL)	Foothills Bisons (HJHL)	N/A	Spruce Grove, AB
2003	Spruce Grove Regals (CapJHL)	Fort St. John Huskies (NWJHL)	Okotoks Bisons (HJHL)	Okotoks, AB
2004	Red Deer Vipers (HJHL)	Calgary Stampeders (CalJHL)	Okotoks Bisons (HJHL)	Lloydminster, AB
2005	Calgary Stampeders (CalJHL)	Vegreville Rangers (NEAJBHL)	Peace Air Navigators (NWJHL)	Calgary, AB
2006	**Red Deer Vipers** (HJHL)	Edmonton Royals (CapJHL)	Okotoks Bisons (HJHL)	Grande Prairie, AB
2007	Lacombe Wranglers (HJHL)	Spruce Grove Regals (CapJHL)	Edmonton Red Wings (CapJHL)	Spruce Grove, AB
2008	**Sherwood Park Knights** (CapJHL)	Three Hills Thrashers (HJHL)	none	Three Hills, AB
2009	Lloydminster Bandits (NEAJBHL)	Whitecourt Wolverines (NWJHL)	none	Cold Lake, AB
2010	Beaumont Chiefs (CapJHL)	Whitecourt Wolverines (NWJHL)	none	Peace River, AB
2011	**Blackfalds Wranglers** (HJHL)	Beaumont Chiefs (CapJHL)	none	Leduc, AB
2012	Whitecourt Wolverines (NWJHL)	Okotoks Bisons (HJHL)	Edmonton Royals (CapJHL)	Okotoks, AB
2013	Okotoks Bisons (HJHL)	Sherwood Park Knights (CapJHL)	Cold Lake Ice (NEAJBHL)	Wainwright, AB
2014	Blackfalds Wranglers (HJHL)	Grande Prairie Kings (NWJHL)	North Peace Navigators (NWJHL)	Grande Prairie, AB
2015	North Edmonton Red Wings (CapJHL)	North Peace Navigators (NWJHL)	Fairview Flyers (NWJHL)	Stony Plain, AB
2016	North Peace Navigators (NWJHL)	Wainwright Bisons (NEAJBHL)	Wetaskiwin Icemen (CapJHL)	Red Deer, AB
2017	**Wainwright Bisons** (NEAJBHL)	Cochrane Generals (HJHL)	Wetaskiwin Icemen (CapJHL)	St. Paul, AB
2018 (Note: Alberta did not send a representative to the Keystone Cup)	Wainwright Bisons (NEAJBHL)	Red Deer Vipers (HJHL)	Beverly Warriors (CapJHL)	Fort St. John, BC
2019	Airdrie Thunder (HJHL)	Wainwright Bisons (NEAJBHL)	Wetaskiwin Icemen (CapJHL)	Wetaskiwin, AB
2020	Tournament cancelled due to COVID-19 pandemic			
2021	Tournament cancelled due to COVID-19 pandemic			
2022	Fort St. John Huskies (NWJHL)	Cochrane Generals (HJHL)	Okotoks Bisons (HJHL)	Wainwright, AB
2023	Wainwright Bisons (NEAJBHL)	Okotoks Bisons (Host)	CBHA Rangers (CalJHL)	Okotoks, AB
2024	Okotoks Bisons (HJHL)	La Crete Lumber Barons (NWJHL)	St. Albert Merchants (CapJHL)	Peace River, AB
2025	Morinville Jets (CapJHL)	Wainwright Bisons (NEAJBHL)	Sylvan Lake Wranglers (HJHL)	Morinville, AB
2026	La Crete Lumber Barons (NWJHL)	Medicine Hat Cubs (HJHL)	Vermilion Tigers (NEAJBHL)	Lloydminster, SK

Teams that went on to win the Keystone Cup listed in bold
