= St. Albert Comets =

- City: St. Albert, Alberta, Canada
- League: Noralta Junior Hockey League
- Founded: 1992
- Home arena: Servus Place
- Colours: Blue, Gold, White
- Head coach: George Gilbeau
- Asst. coach: Doug Mackay, Doug Wadlow, Ty Ambrosie, Keegan Richards
- Captain: Jacob Hayward
- Media: Brandon Elias

The St. Albert Comets are a Junior C ice hockey team in the Noralta Junior Hockey League (NJHL) based out of St. Albert, Alberta. They play their home games at Servus Credit Union Place.

== History ==
The St. Albert Comets began life in the 1992 season as the St. Albert Shooters. They joined the Noralta Junior Hockey League for the 1996/97 season. The club was renamed the St. Albert Comets to honour the Senior A hockey club that played in parts of the 1960s and 1970s in St. Albert.

=== Name timeline ===
- 1992 - 1997: St. Albert Shooters
- 1997 - 1999: St. Albert Mustangs
- 2000 - 2002: St. Albert Bruins
- 2003 - 2011: St. Albert Blues
- 2012–Present: St. Albert Comets

== Sources ==
- http://njhl.hockeyshift.com/history
