= Hockey Calgary =

Hockey Calgary is the governing body for ice hockey in the city of Calgary, Alberta, Canada at the Junior "B", Junior "C", and Minor levels. The organization is a subsection of Hockey Alberta and Hockey Canada.

== Associations ==
The following community associations are member associations of Hockey Calgary:

=== North Division ===
- Bow River Bruins (Established 2006)
- McKnight Mustangs (Established 2001)
- Northwest Warriors (Established 2014)
- Rockyview Raiders (Established 2023)
- Springbank Rockies (Established 1985)
- Trails West Wolves (Established 1983)

=== South Division ===
- Glenlake Hawks (Established 1981)
- Bow Valley Flames (Established 1989)
- Knights Hockey Club (Established 2019)
- Southside Thunder (Established 2012)
- Southwest Cougars (Established 2016)
- Wolverines Hockey Club (Established 2021)

== Calgary Junior Hockey League ==
The Calgary Junior Hockey League is a Junior "B" league. The league competes against the different Junior "B" leagues in Alberta for the Alberta Provincial Junior B Hockey Championship. The winner of the provincial will compete against the champions of the British Columbia Amateur Hockey Association, Hockey Saskatchewan, Hockey Manitoba, and Hockey Northwestern Ontario for the Keystone Cup—the Western Canadian Jr. B Crown.

== Calgary Junior C Hockey League ==
The Calgary Junior "C" League is run out of the different city centres in Calgary. The champion and two runners-up compete against the top three teams of the Noralta Junior Hockey League for the Provincial Junior "C" title.

=== Teams 2025-26' ===
- Airdrie Dragons
- Bow River Bruins
- Chestermere Lakers
- Cochrane Generals
- McKnight Mustangs
- Northwest Warriors
- Raiders Hockey Club
- Southside Thunder
- Springbank Rockies
- Trails West T-Dubs
- Wolverines Jr HC

=== Champions ===
Season	Champion	Finalist	Provincial 'C' Winner
1989	Seven Clubs	Midnapore	
1990	Seven Clubs	Properties	
1991	Midnapore	Properties	
1992			
1993			
1994	Seven Clubs	Glenlake	
1995	Glenlake	Crowchild Blackhawks	
1996	Calgary North Central	Crowchild Blackhawks	Sexsmith Vipers
1997	Calgary North Central	Southland	Southland
1998	Crowchild Blackhawks	Seven Clubs	none
1999	Calgary North Central	Crowchild Blackhawks	none
2000	Southside	Seven Clubs	Oyen Bees
2001	Properties	Southside	none
2002	Airdrie	Crowchild Blackhawks	none
2003	Airdrie	Springbank Rockies	Springbank Rockies
2004	Springbank Rockies	Southside Devils	Springbank Rockies
2005	Blackfoot Chiefs	Springbank Rockies	Edmonton Oil Kings (NJHL)
2006	Springbank Rockies	Southside Stingers	Edmonton Oil Kings (NJHL)
2007	Springbank Rockies	Trails West Wolves	Edmonton Oil Kings (NJHL)
2008	Southside Thunder	Airdrie	Sherwood Park Renegades (NJHL)
2009	Crowchild Blackhawks	Southside Thunder	Edmonton Ice (NJHL)
2010	Crowchild Blackhawks	Southside Thunder	Seera Icemen (NJHL)
2011	Springbank Rockies	Crowchild Blackhawks	Beaumont Braves (NJHL)
2012	Springbank Rockies	Southside Thunder	Edmonton Avalanche (NJHL)
2013	Springbank Rockies	Crowchild Blackhawks	Edmonton Avalanche (NJHL)
2014	Springbank Rockies	Southside Predators	Edmonton Avalanche (NJHL)
2015	Northwest Warriors Wolf Pack	Trails West Wolves	Edmonton Avalanche (NJHL)
2016	Springbank Rockies	Blackfoot Chiefs	Edmonton Avalanche (NJHL)
2017	Trails West Wolves	Blackfoot Chiefs	NEZ North Stars (NJHL)
2018	Northwest Warriors	Bow Valley Flames	Sherwood Park Renegades (NJHL)
2019	Springbank Rockies	Simons Valley Storm	Edmonton Avalanche (NJHL)
2020		No playoffs due to covid	
2021		No playoffs due to covid	
2022	Springbank Rockies	Trails West Wolves	Springbank Rockies
2023	Wolverines	Bow River Bruins	Calgary Wolverines
2024	Wolverines	Chestermere Lakers	Wolverines Jr HC
2025	Chestermere Lakers	Bow River Bruins	Edmonton Mavericks (NJHL)
2026	Bow River Bruins	Chestermere Lakers	Sherwood Park Renegades (NJHL)

== Former/Inactive teams ==
- Elbow Park Stars | 1989 - 2008 (Ceased Operations)
- Shaw Meadows Bolts | 1995 - 2016 (Merged with Southland to form Southwest Cougars)
- Midnapore Whalers/Mavericks | 1986 - 2019 (Merged with Lake Bonavista to form Knights HC)
- Crowfoot Coyotes | 1986 - 2023 (Merged with Simons Valley to form Rockyview Raiders)
- Simons Valley Storm | 1994 - 2023 (Merged with Crowfoot to form Rockyview Raiders)
- Lake Bonavista Breakers | 1973 - 2019 (Merged with Midnapore to form Knights HC)
- Southland Stingers | 1990 - 2016 (Merged with Shaw Meadows to form Southwest Cougars)
- Westwood Warriors | 1989 - 2013 (Became Northwest Warriors)
- Ogden Aces | 1977 - 2005 (Ceased Operations)
- Blackfoot Chiefs | 1989 - 2021 (Became Wolverines HC)
- Seven Clubs Vipers | 1983 - 2007 (Ceased Operations)
- Saints Hockey Club | 2005 - 2020 (Ceased Operations)
- Fish Creek Falcons | 1985 - 2002 (Ceased Operations)
- Ridgewood Rangers | 1989 - 2002 (Ceased Operations
- Beddington Blizzard | 1985 - 2001 (Ceased Operations)
- Springbank Rockies | ??? - 2024

== See also ==
- Hockey Canada
- Hockey Alberta
- Calgary Junior Hockey League
- Alberta Junior Hockey League
- Western Hockey League
- Ice hockey in Calgary
