= St. Albert Merchants =

Canadian junior ice hockey team founded 1983

- City: St. Albert, Alberta
- League: Capital Junior Hockey League
- Division: West Division
- Founded: 1983-84
- Home arena: Jarome Iginla Arena
- Colours: Blue, Gold, Grey, White
- General manager: (Canada) Steve Barwick
- Head coach: (Canada) Niall O'Donoghue
- Captain: (Canada) David Saunders
- Website: www.stalbertmerchants.com

Franchise history
- 1983-present: St. Albert Merchants

The St. Albert Merchants are a Canadian Junior B ice hockey team located in St. Albert, Alberta. They play in the Capital Junior Hockey League out of the Jarome Iginla Arena. They are coached by Niall O'Donoghue and Ian McFatridge.

The Merchants have won a total of six league titles, including four consecutive championships from 1994–95 to 1997–98. The Merchants are two time Alberta Junior B provincial champions, winning the Russ Barnes Trophy in 1986 and 1996, advancing to the Keystone Cup Junior B championships for Western Canada.

== History ==
The Merchants were founded in 1983. They won the league championship, and the provincial championship, in 1985-86, their third year. They won the league championship again in the 1987-88, before finishing second at the provincials. They won the league championship again the next two years, and again in 1994-95. They repeated, yet again, in 1995-96, winning the provincial title, before finishing runner-up at the 1996 Keystone Cup. In 1996-97, the Merchants went undefeated in the regular season, before winning the league championship yet again. The following season, they finished second in the first edition of the new provincial championship, the champion of whom now won the Russ Barnes Trophy. They made the provincials again the next season, before losing in the provincial semi-finals. Since the turn of the century, the Merchants have had a number of difficult seasons, interspersed by a league title in 2004-05. They often did not progress past the first round in many seasons, before the 2012-13 season, when they returned to the league final, where they lost to the Sherwood Park Knights. They made the league final again the following year, losing again, this time to the Fort Saskatchewan Hawks. In 2014-15, they finished first in their division, but were upset in the second round by the Stony Plain Flyers. In January 2014, the Merchants donated all admission ticket sales and money raised from the 50/50 draw to the local RCMP station, in an act of remembrance for the RCMP officer killed in a shooting outside a St. Albert casino the previous year.

Franchise Regular Season leader in goals- Matt Havens(72)

Franchise Regular Season leader in assists- Casey Reid(132)

Franchise Regular Season leader in points- Casey Reid(202)

Franchise Regular Season leader in penalty- Chris Clark(360)

Franchise Regular Season leader in games played- Daniel Rombough(115)

Franchise playoff leader in goals- Casey Reid(16)

Franchise playoff leader in assists- Casey Reid(25)

Franchise playoff leader in points- Casey Reid(41)

Franchise playoff leader in penalty minutes- Jared Kwasney(91)

Franchise playoff leader in games played- Casey Reid(43)

== Recent Season-by-season record ==
Note: GP = Games played, W = Wins, L = Losses, T = Ties, OTL = Overtime Losses, Pts = Points, GF = Goals for, GA = Goals against

Records as of 2016-17 season.

Season	GP	W	L	T	OTL	Pts	GF	GA	Finish	Playoffs
2009-10	38	11	25	0	2	24	124	205	6th, West	Lost First Round, (Red Wings)
2010–11	38	19	18	0	1	39	165	157	5th, West	Lost First Round, (Regals)
2011-12	38	19	15	0	4	42	143	142	4th, West	Lost First Round, (Mustangs)
2012-13	38	22	12	0	4	48	168	136	4th, West	Lost League Final, (Knights)
2013-14	38	34	3	0	1	69	221	88	1st, West	Lost League Final, (Hawks)
2014-15	38	32	6	0	0	64	198	120	1st, West	Lost Second Round, (Flyers)
2015-16	38	24	12	0	5	50	185	139	3rd, West	Won First Round, 2-1 (Flyers); Won Quarters, 3-2 (Mustangs); Lost Semifinals, 1-4 (Chiefs)
2016-17	38	18	16	0	4	40	147	173	4th, West	Lost First Round, 0-2 (Flyers)
2017-18	38	21	16	0	1	43	150	150	4th, West	Won First Round, 2-1 (Flyers); Lost Quarters, 0-3 (Warriors)
2018-19	38	14	19	1	4	33	136	167	4th, West	Won Qualifying Round, 2-0 (Mustangs); Lost Quarterfinals 0-3 (Warriors)
2019-20	38	23	14	0	1	47	181	159	3rd of 7 West; 5th of 14 League	Won First Round, 2-1 (Flyers); Lost Quarters, 2-3 (Warriors)
2020-21	4	0	3	0	1	1	12	21	Remainder of Season	Cancelled due to Covid
2021-22	38	25	9	0	4	54	168	104	1st of 7 West; 3rd of 14 League	Lost Quarters, 2-3 (Red Wings)
2022-23	38	31	4	-	3	65	247	98	1st of 7 West; 1st of 14 League	Won Quarterfinals 3-0 (Flyers); Won Semifinals 3-2 (Chiefs); Lost League Finals 1-4 (Knights)
2023-24	38	32	5	0	1	65	234	102	1st of 7 West; 1st of 14 League	Won Quarterfinals 3-0 (Flyers); Won Semifinals 3-2 (Jets); Won League Finals, 4-1 (Chiefs) advance to Alberta Provincials
2024-25	38	27	9	-	2	56	188	124	2nd of 7 West; 4th of 14 League	Lost Quarterfinals 0-3 (Mustangs)
2025-26	38	13	22	0	3	29	144	178	5th of 7 West; 11th of 14 League	Won Qualifying Rd 2-1 (Red Wings); Lost Semifinals 1-3 (Mustangs)

== Alberta Jr. B Provincial Championships ==
Year	Round Robin	Record	Standing	SemiFinal	Bronze Medal Game	Gold Medal Game
2024	L, Okotoks Bisons, 5-6; L, Wainwright Bisons, 0–4; W, NWCAA Stampeders, 8-2; W, North Peace Navigators, 9-5	2-2–0	3rd of 6	n/a	Won 6-5; Wainwright Bisons; Bronze Medalists	n/a

== See also ==
- List of ice hockey teams in Alberta
