= Thorhild Titans =

Ice hockey team in Alberta, Canada

- City: Thorhild, Alberta
- League: North Eastern Alberta Junior B Hockey League
- Founded: 2009–10
- Home arena: Thorhild Agriplex
- Colours: Blue, Red, White
- General manager: (Canada) Jon Mazurenko
- Head coach: (Canada) Jason Johns
- Website: www.neajbhlhockey.com/titans

Franchise history
- 2009-2012: Thorhild Titans

The Thorhild Titans were a Junior "B" Ice Hockey team based in Thorhild, Alberta, Canada that played from 2009 until 2012. They were members of the North Eastern Alberta Junior B Hockey League (NEAJBHL), and played their home games at Thorhild Agriplex.

== History ==
The Thorhild Titans were created in 2009 by Manager and President Mike Theroux and are a member of the North Eastern Alberta Junior B Hockey League (NEAJBHL). The Team is based out of Thorhild AB, which is located 30 minutes north of Edmonton. The Titans have advanced to the playoffs in two of three seasons The Team has had 2 coaches John Mazerenko and Jason Johns who together hold a record of 15-131-2 after three seasons. The Titans currently have a 0-6 record in the playoffs not making it passed the first round.

The Thorhild Titans folded after the 2011-12 season.

== Season-by-season record ==
Note: GP = Games played, W = Wins, L = Losses, OTL = Overtime Losses, Pts = Points, GF = Goals for, GA = Goals against, PIM = Penalties in minutes

Season	GP	W	L	OTL	Pts	GF	GA	PIM	Finish	Playoffs
2009-10	32	5	27	0	10	80	241	--	8th, NEAJBHL	
2010-11	32	3	28	1	7	72	278	937	8th, NEAJBHL	Lost in Quarterfinals, 0-3 (Ice)
2011-12	32	6	25	1	13	85	245	578	7th, NEAJBHL	Lost in Quarterfinals, 0-3 ( Cold Lake Ice)

== Roster ==
Name	Position	Goals	Assists	Points	Games Played	All Star Appearances
Alfred Lavelle	Forward	49	29	78	96	2
Daryn Feledichuk	Defence	22	52	74	101	2
Ryan Kuich	Forward	36	29	65	113	1
Kevin Semniuk	Forward	25	23	48	53	1
Garen Desroches	Forward	13	22	35	116	0
Josh Brown	Defence	12	14	26	93	0
Josh Ford	Forward	14	12	26	62	0
Jordan Boychuk	Forward	8	12	20	29	1
Cole Lazowski	Defence	9	6	15	32	0
Mike Feledichuk	Defence	2	12	14	28	1

Name	Position	Wins	Losses	Overtime Losses	Games Played	Save%	GAA
Taylor Biro	Goaltender	9	30	2	41	88.97	4.62
Jeremy Semtner	Goaltender	4	16	0	20	84.00	7.78
Bryce Kammanmayer	Goaltender	1	0	0	1	93.33	2.40
Patrick Kroeger	Goaltender	1	14	0	15	84.31	5.06
Mike Towle	Goaltender	0	12	0	12	82.23	6.98
Austin Hoetmer	Goaltender	0	11	0	11	81.16	7.94
Alex Ritchie	Goaltender	0	19	0	19	78.42	8.16
Douglas Toronchuk	Goaltender	0	7	0	7	76.77	8.29
