= Vegreville Rangers =

- City: Vegreville, Alberta, Canada
- League: North Eastern Alberta Junior B Hockey League
- Founded: 1974–75
- Home arena: Wally Fedun Arena
- Colours: Blue, red, white
- General manager: (Canada) Craig Steinbach
- Head coach: (Canada) Trevor Ogrodnick
- Website: www.vegrevillejrrangers.com/

Franchise history
- 1974–present: Vegreville Rangers

The Vegreville Rangers are a junior "B" ice hockey team based in Vegreville, Alberta, Canada. They are members of the North Eastern Alberta Junior B Hockey League (NEAJBHL). They play their home games at Wally Fedun Arena. As a Western Canadian Junior B hockey team, the Rangers are eligible for the Keystone Cup.

== Season-by-season record ==
Note: GP = Games played, W = Wins, L = Losses, OTL = Overtime Losses, Pts = Points, GF = Goals for, GA = Goals against, PIM = Penalties in minutes

Season	GP	W	L	OTL	Pts	GF	GA	PIM	Finish	Playoffs
2010–11	32	23	9	0	46	219	115	795	3rd, NEAJBHL	Won in Quarterfinals, 3–1 (Tigers); Lost in Semifinals, 0–4 (Bandits)
2011–12	32	26	5	1	53	233	99	771	1st, NEAJBHL	Won in Quarterfinals, 3–1 (Warriors); Lost in Semifinals, 3–4 (Wheat Kings)
2012–13	34	15	16	3	33	135	145	—	6th, NEAJBHL	Lost in Quarterfinals, 3–4 (Wheat Kings)
2013–14	34	11	21	2	24	117	167	—	8th, NEAJBHL	Lost in Quarterfinals, 3–4 (Ice)
2014–15	36	15	19	2	32	142	166	1136	6th, NEAJBHL	Lost in Quarterfinals, 0–4 (Wheat Kings)
2015–16	36	18	18	0	36	163	153	1049	6th of 10, NEAJBHL	Lost in Quarterfinals, 1–4 (Canadiens)
2016–17	36	8	23	5	21	98	214	1084	9th of 10, NEAJBHL	Did not qualify
2017–18	36	9	25	2	20	126	250	1161	9th of 10, NEAJBHL	Did not qualify
2018–19	32	2	30	0	4	70	238	973	9th of 9, NEAJBHL	Did not qualify
2019–20	32	7	24	1	15	106	210	926	8th of 8, NEAJBHL	Lost in Quarterfinals, 0–4 (Clippers)
2020–21	Inactive									
2021–22	Inactive									
2022–23	31	2	27	2	6	59	240	830	8th of 8, NEAJBHL	Lost in Quarterfinals, 0–4 (Tigers)
2023–24	31	5	26	0	10	88	223	x	7th of 8, NEAJBHL	Lost in Quarterfinals, 0–4 (Bisons)
2024–25	35	14	21	0	0	163	187	x	7th of 8, NEAJBHL	Lost in Quarterfinals, 0–4 (Tigers)
2025–26	36	1	35	0	2	70	257	x	7th of 7, NEAJBHL	Did Not Qualify for Playoffs

== NHL alumni ==
- Brent Severyn
