= Hockey Alberta =

Ice hockey governing body in Alberta

- Sport: Ice hockey
- Jurisdiction: Alberta
- Founded: 1907
- Headquarters: Red Deer
- Chairman: Len Samletzki
- CEO: Rob Litwinski

Official website
- www.hockeyalberta.ca

Hockey Alberta is the governing body of all ice hockey in Alberta, Canada and is affiliated with Hockey Canada. It was founded in 1907 as the Alberta Amateur Hockey Association (AAHA) to be the governing body for Alberta intra-city ice hockey play. As of the 2024-25 hockey season, the chair of the board of directors was Len Samletzki, and the chief executive officer for operations management was Rob Litwinski.

== History ==
Hockey had been played for over 10 years before Alberta was proclaimed a province in 1905. Play took place on an exhibition or friendly basis. As teams developed, a need developed for a governing body to administer the game at a provincial level for intra-city games. At a November 29, 1907 meeting in Red Deer, the Alberta Amateur Hockey Association was founded, with R.N. Brown elected as the first president of the organization.

In 1914, the AAHA would be one of the founding associations for the Canadian Amateur Hockey Association, formed at meetings held on December 4, 1914 in the Chateau Laurier at Ottawa.

In 2007, the centennial of the association was celebrated with the hosting of the Allan Cup in Stony Plain.

=== Senior League history ===
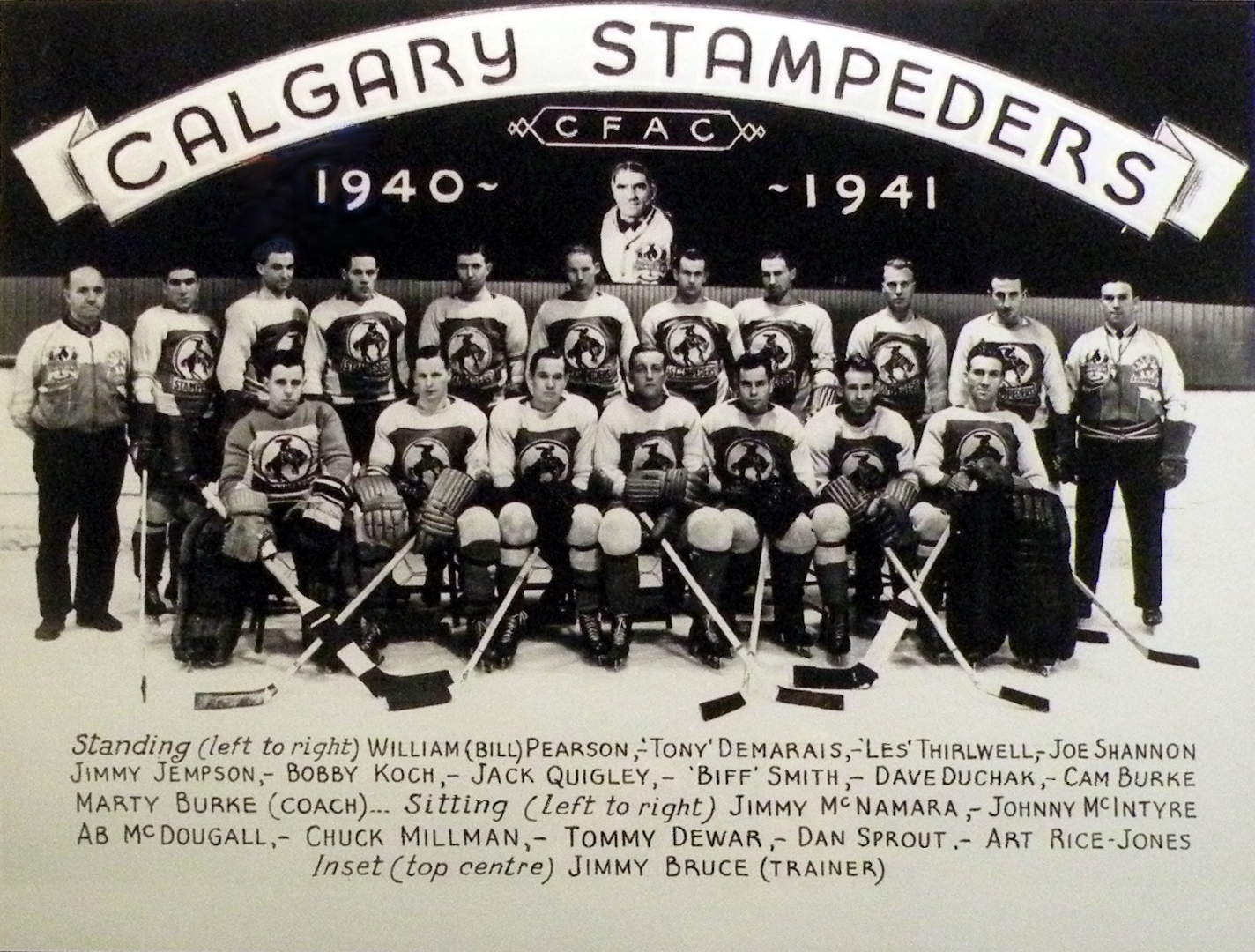
1940-41 Calgary Stampeders of the Alberta Senior Hockey League

In 1907 senior amateur hockey was organized into two tiers; the "A" level saw associations from Edmonton, Strathcona and Battleford, Saskatchewan. This "A" level was only technically amateur. A second "B" level was formed that was "pure amateur." In the 1907-08 season, the Edmonton Hockey Club would win the Alberta "A" championship and challenge the Montreal Wanderers for the Stanley Cup.

While Calgary was larger than Edmonton at the time of the AAHA founding, the Calgary associations declined to participate until joining the Senior "A" league in 1910. The Calgary Shermans, named for their rink, were the first team from Calgary. In 1910, Edmonton would again challenge for the Stanley Cup, this time against the Ottawa Senators. This would be the last challenge for the Stanley Cup from AAHA teams. After the founding of the professional National Hockey Association, Canada's amateur senior teams would compete for the Allan Cup, which they do to this day.

=== Big Four League ===
For more information, see Big-4 League.

In 1919, under the guidance of AAHA league president Allan McCaw, a new elite senior amateur league was established in Alberta with two teams each in Calgary and Edmonton. The league's intention was to compete for the Allan Cup, emblematic of Canada's national senior championship. The Tigers were created, along with the Canadians to represent Calgary, while the Edmonton Eskimos and Dominions represented Alberta's capital. The Calgary teams were hosted at the Victoria Arena, which had been converted into a hockey rink in 1918.

While the Big Four League billed itself as an amateur circuit, it became known as a notorious example of a "shamateur" league, as amateur teams secretly employed professional players in an attempt to gain an upper hand on their competition. When the Big Four announced their intention to compete in the Allan Cup playdowns, the Pacific Coast Hockey Association sent a letter of protest to the Canadian Hockey Association, demanding that the league be declared professional, thus ineligible to compete for the Allan Cup. The CHA agreed, and stripped the league of its amateur standing after only one season.

The controversy continued to haunt the Big Four in its second season. Repeated accusations were made by teams against their opponent's star players, accusing them of being pros. An accusation against the Eskimos' goaltender, Bill Tobin by the two Calgary teams led both to threaten to pull out of the league. While Tobin was vindicated, the threats led the league to suspend operations, formally canceling the championship. The Tigers and Eskimos, however, agreed to play their own playoff, known as the Intercity Championship. The Tigers defeated the Eskimos in a two-game, total goal series, but the Big Four League was finished.

After the Big Four League disbanded and the Tigers and Eskimos formed the openly professional Western Canada Hockey League, the AAHA could concentrate on true amateur play. Various senior leagues have existed since 1921, and teams such as the Calgary Stampeders and Edmonton Flyers have played for and won the Allan Cup.

=== Junior League History ===
Alberta junior teams played against Saskatchewan Hockey Association teams to qualify for the Memorial Cup dating back to 1919. The first Alberta junior team to qualify for the Memorial Cup Finals was the Calgary Canadians in 1924. The Canadians would win the Memorial Cup in 1926.

Like the rest of Canada, the junior leagues have developed into various tiers as the number of teams and popularity of ice hockey has grown. Today the CHL's Western Hockey League is the top junior level league operating in Alberta. Hockey Alberta operates the Alberta Junior Hockey League which was formed in 1963.

In the 2024–25 season, Hockey Canada and its four western affiliates – BC Hockey, Hockey Alberta, Hockey Saskatchewan and Hockey Manitoba – piloted the Western Canadian Development Model (WCDM). Under the WCDM, junior leagues will adopt most of the Western Hockey League rulebook, excluding some sections, and restrictions on 15-year-old affiliate players in the Western Hockey League were loosened. Players that will be 18-years of age or older in the calendar year will be allowed to choose whether to use full-face protection or half-face protection, whilst younger players will be required to use full-face protection.

The WCDM was expanded in the 2025–26 season to include the following rules changes:

- Western Junior A teams will be permitted to register up to five U.S.-born players at one time on their active roster, a decrease from the previous six.
- 16- and 17-year-old U.S.-born players who have been drafted, listed or signed by a WHL team will be eligible to be rostered by any Western Junior A team.
- Each Western Junior A team will be eligible to roster one 16- or 17-year-old player whose parent(s) reside(s) outside of their province or region, if the player has been drafted, listed or signed by a WHL team
  - Up to a maximum of 23 such players across all Western Junior A teams, or one player from each WHL team.
- Out-of-province players who participate in the Canadian Sport School Hockey League (CSSHL) will be eligible to affiliate with Western Junior A teams in their school’s respective province or region.
- No more than eight players born in a province not participating in the WCDM may be registered on the active roster of a Western Junior A team.

== Leagues ==
- Alberta Elite Hockey League - U18 "AAA"
- Alberta Major Bantam Hockey League - Bantam "AAA"
- Chinook Hockey League - Senior Hockey
- North Peace Hockey League - Senior Hockey
- Alberta Junior Hockey League - Junior "A"
- Calgary Junior Hockey League - Junior "B"
- Capital Junior Hockey League - Junior "B"
- Heritage Junior B Hockey League - Junior "B"
- North Eastern Alberta Junior B Hockey League - Junior "B"
- Northwest Junior Hockey League - Junior "B"
- Calgary Junior C Hockey League - Junior "C"
- Noralta Junior Hockey League - Junior "C"

== Former leagues ==
- Western Canada Junior Hockey League (1948–1956) Junior "A"
- Central Alberta Hockey League - Senior Hockey (1956-1965)

== Notable people ==
- Frank Sandercock, AAHA president (1922–1925)
- W. G. Hardy, AAHA president (1931–1933)
- Art Potter, AAHA president (1955–1958)
- Joe Kryczka, AAHA president (1967–1969)

== See also ==
- List of ice hockey teams in Alberta
- Hockey Calgary
