= Onion Lake Border Chiefs =

Onion Lake Scouts
- City: Onion Lake, Saskatchewan
- League: USPHL Premier
- Founded: 2014–15
- Home arena: Onion Lake Memorial Communiplex
- Colours: Orange, Red, white

Franchise history
- 2014–2018: Onion Lake Border Chiefs
- 2022–2025: Onion Lake Border Chiefs
- 2025–present: Onion Lake Scouts

The Onion Lake Scouts are a Canadian junior ice hockey team located in Onion Lake, Saskatchewan. They compete in the United States Premier Hockey League (USPHL) Premier's Alberta Division and play out of the Onion Lake Memorial Communiplex.

== History ==
The Border Chiefs were founded in 2014 along with the Frog Lake T-Birds. They became the second team in the NEAJBHL to play out of a First Nations reserve (the other being the T-Birds). In their first season, they finished eighth out of ten teams in the NEAJBHL, with a record of 13–20–3, and were swept in the first round of the NEAJBHL playoffs by the Wainwright Bisons.

After the 2017-18 season the Border Chiefs took several years of absence before becoming an active league member again, for the 2022-23 season. After the 2024–25 season the Border Chiefs were replaced by the Onion Lake Scouts, one of five clubs that founded the Alberta Elite Junior Hockey League (AEJHL), announced on May 2, 2025. The Scouts joined the USPHL Premier's Alberta Division for the 2025–26 season. In the regular season they placed last in the Alberta Division with a record of 8–13–1–1. In the playoffs the Scouts defeated the Hanna Havoc 11–6 and the Three Hills Titans 8–5 in pool play, then beat the Diamond Valley Rockies 5–4 in the crossover round. They met the division-leading Calgary Bandits in the best-of-three Alberta Final, losing Game 1 in Lloydminster 1–5, winning Game 2 in Calgary 7–6, then winning Game 3 on March 31, 2026 by a score of 6–3 to claim the inaugural USPHL Premier Alberta Division championship.

== Season-by-season record ==
Onion Lake Border Chiefs
Season	GP	W	L	OTL	Pts	GF	GA	PIM	Finish	Playoffs
2014–15	36	13	20	3	29	140	194	1078	8th, NEAJBHL	Lost Quarterfinals, 0–4 (Bisons)
2015–16	36	19	16	1	39	168	161	982	5th of 10, NEAJBHL	Lost Quarterfinals, 1–4 (Ice)
2016–17	36	14	18	4	32	120	151	935	7th of 10, NEAJBHL	Lost Quarterfinals, 1–4 (Canadiens)
2017–18	36	6	26	4	16	134	221	924	10th of 10, NEAJBHL	Did not qualify
2022–23	31	3	27	1	7	57	218	x	7th of 8, NEAJBHL	Lost Quarterfinals, 1–4 (Bisons)
2023–24	31	0	30	1	1	38	303	x	8th of 8, NEAJBHL	Lost Quarterfinals, 0–4 (Canadiens)
2024–25	35	0	35	0	0	31	507	x	8th of 8, NEAJBHL	Did not qualify
Onion Lake Scouts
Season	GP	W	L	OTL	SOL	GF	GA	Pts	Finish	Playoffs
2025–26	24	9	13	1	1	85	114	20	6th of 6, Alberta Div; 69 of 77 USPHL Premier	North Pod round robin Won (Hanna Havoc), 11-6; Won (Three Hills Titans), 8-5; Won Semifinal (Diamond Valley Rockies), 5-4 ot 'Won Division finals (Calgary Bandits) 2 gms to 1 no National appearance

== See also ==
- List of ice hockey teams in Saskatchewan
