= Milan Tichý =

- Born: September 22, 1969 (age 56) Plzeň, Czechoslovakia
- Height: 6 ft 3 in (191 cm)
- Weight: 200 lb (91 kg; 14 st 4 lb)
- Position: Defence
- Shot: Left
- Played for: Chicago Blackhawks; New York Islanders
- National team: Czechoslovakia
- NHL draft: 153rd overall, 1989; Chicago Blackhawks
- Playing career: 1988–1996

Milan Tichý (born September 22, 1969) is a Czech former professional ice hockey defenceman.

He was drafted 153rd overall by the Chicago Blackhawks in the 1989 NHL entry draft and played 13 games for them during the 1992–93 NHL season. He was claimed by the Florida Panthers in the 1993 NHL Expansion Draft but never played a game for them and was traded to the Winnipeg Jets for Brent Severyn before the season started. He spent the entire season in the American Hockey League with the Moncton Hawks and never played for Winnipeg. He moved to New York Islanders in 1994 and played ten games over two seasons.

He is currently an amateur scout for the National Hockey League's Columbus Blue Jackets, scouting players in the Czech Republic, Slovakia, Finland, Russia, Sweden and Germany.

== Career statistics ==
=== Regular season and playoffs ===
			Regular season					Playoffs
Season	Team	League	GP	G	A	Pts	PIM	GP	G	A	Pts	PIM
1985–86	TJ Škoda Plzeň	CSSR U18	32	10	15	25	—	—	—	—	—	—
1987–88	TJ Škoda Plzeň	CSSR	29	1	3	4	20	—	—	—	—	—
1988–89	TJ Škoda Plzeň	CSSR	28	1	5	6	44	8	0	7	7	—
1989–90	ASVŠ Dukla Trenčín	CSSR	52	14	8	22	—	9	1	2	3	—
1990–91	ASVŠ Dukla Trenčín	CSSR	39	9	11	20	72	2	0	1	1	0
1991–92	Indianapolis Ice	IHL	49	6	23	29	28	—	—	—	—	—
1992–93	Chicago Blackhawks	NHL	13	0	1	1	30	—	—	—	—	—
1992–93	Indianapolis Ice	IHL	49	7	32	39	62	4	0	5	5	14
1993–94	Moncton Hawks	AHL	48	1	20	21	103	20	3	3	6	12
1994–95	Denver Grizzlies	IHL	71	18	36	54	90	17	4	9	13	12
1994–95	New York Islanders	NHL	2	0	0	0	2	—	—	—	—	—
1995–96	New York Islanders	NHL	8	0	4	4	8	—	—	—	—	—
1995–96	Utah Grizzlies	IHL	21	1	12	13	26	—	—	—	—	—
CSSR totals			148	25	27	52	—	19	1	10	11	—
NHL totals			23	0	5	5	40	—	—	—	—	—

=== International ===
Year	Team	Event	GP	G	A	Pts	PIM
1988	Czechoslovakia	WJC	7	1	2	3	2
1989	Czechoslovakia	WJC	7	3	2	5	2
Senior totals			14	4	4	8	4
