= Strathcona Bruins =

- City: Strathcona County, Alberta
- League: Capital Junior Hockey League
- Division: East Division
- Founded: 1978
- Home arena: Strathcona Olympiette Centre
- Colours: Black, Gold, White
- Website: Strathcona Bruins Website

Franchise history
- 1978-2008: Strathcona Sabres
- 2008-present: Strathcona Bruins

The Strathcona Bruins are a Junior B hockey team playing in the Capital Junior Hockey League. The team was renamed the Bruins in 2008 after playing under the name Sabres since 1978.

The Bruins hosted the 2012-13 season All-Star Game at the Ardrossan Recreation Complex. Rookies Jordan Martin, Jeff Bronetto, and Robbie Lloyd represented the Bruins in the Rookie Game, in which the East Rookies defeated the West Rookies 9-8. Keagan Gorda, Dan Ketsa, and Wes Walkeden represented the Bruins in the All-Star Game, which the East won 10-9 in overtime. Ketsa was named MVP of the game for the East.

== Home Arena ==
The Bruins play out of the Strathcona Olympiette Centre (SOC) located in Strathcona County.

"With a capacity of approximately 400 spectator seats and additional standing room around the arena, SOC is one of the largest and brightest facilities in the CJHL. The arena features a fully functional Air Horn and rotating lights above the scoreboard used every time the Bruins score a goal. The facility features a full sized ice surface and miniature ice surface roughly a 1/3 the size of a regular hockey rink. Adjoining the arena, a five-sheet curling rink complete with its own lobby and lounge. Along with a fully functional kitchen located upstairs, SOC is one of the premier multi-purpose facilities located within Strathcona County. The main ice surface features a full sized centre ice Strathcona Bruins logo, one of the few arenas within the Edmonton area to have that privilege (Rogers Place is the only other arena displaying a logo to that magnitude). In the future the Bruins are looking to add their own private dressing room to accommodate the players, along with a fully functional fitness facility to be located within the arena to be used by the Bruins Junior Hockey Club, and the players and parents who frequently use the facility".

== Recent Season-by-season record ==
Note: GP = Games played, W = Wins, L = Losses, T = Ties, OTL = Overtime Losses, Pts = Points, GF = Goals for, GA = Goals against

Season	GP	W	L	T	OTL	Pts	GF	GA	Finish	Playoffs
2009-10	38	12	22	0	4	28	121	173	5th, East	Won First Round, 2-0 (Sherwood Park Knights); Lost Second Round, 3-2 (Beaumont Chiefs)
2010–11	38	20	16	0	2	44	154	173	4th, East	Lost First Round, 2-0 (Fort Saskatchewan Hawks)
2011-12	38	16	21	0	1	33	137	156	5th, East	Lost First Round, 2-0 (Edmonton Royals)
2012-13	38	14	19	0	5	33	150	188	5th, East	Lost First Round, 2-1 (Beaumont Chiefs)
2013-14	38	17	19	0	2	36	145	162	6th, East	Lost First Round, 2-0 (Beaumont Chiefs)
2014-15	38	18	18	0	2	38	129	136	3rd, East	Lost First Round, 2-1 (Leduc Riggers)
2015-16	38	9	25	0	4	22	99	174	6th, East	Lost First Round, 2-0 (Beaumont Chiefs)
2016-17	38	12	24	0	2	26	117	171	5th, East	Lost First Round, 2-0 (Fort Saskatchewan Hawks)
2017-18	33	16	19	0	3	35	140	193	6th, East	Lost First Round, 0-2 (Fort Saskatchewan Hawks)
2018-19	38	1	35	0	2	4	78	245	7th of 7, East; 14th of 14 CJHL	Did not qualify for playoffs
2019-20	33	12	23	0	3	25	128	172	7th of 7, East; 12th of 14 CJHL	Did not qualify for playoffs
2020-21	2	0	2	0	0	0	3	17	Remainder of Season	Cancelled due to Covid
2021-22	38	11	37	0	0	22	102	202	6th of 7, East; 12th of 14 CJHL	Lost First Round, 1-2 (Fort Saskatchewan Hawks)
2022-23	38	15	21	2	0	32	130	162	4th of 7, East; 9th of 14 CJHL	Won First Round, 2-0 (Wetaskiwin Icemen); Lost Quarters, 0-3 Sherwood Park Knights
2023-24	38	17	19	2	0	36	102	202	5th of 7, East; 9th of 14 CJHL	Lost First Round, 2-0 (Fort Saskatchewan Hawks)
2024-25	38	14	21	3	0	31	154	187	4th of 7, East; 9th of 14 CJHL	Lost First Round, 0-2 (Fort Saskatchewan Hawks)
2025-26	38	13	17	8	0	34	126	166	5th of 7, East; 9th of 14 CJHL	tbd First Round, 0-2 (Edmonton Royals)

== Alumni ==
- Jimmy Quinlan 1999-2003

(NLL - Edmonton Rush Lacrosse Club)

- Shaun Fisher 1999-2003

(ACAC - Grant MacEwan Griffins)

- Ryan Christensen 2000-2004

(ACAC - Concordia Thunder)

- Shawn King 2006-2008

(ACAC - Grant MacEwan Griffins)

- Greg Lutomski 2005-2009
- Jay Renner 2008-2010
- Casey McGillivray 2006-2010
- Adam Bruce 'C' 2008-2010
- Shawn Heaney 2008-2010
- Dylan Berrecloth 2009-2010
- Andrew Wheeler 2009-2010

(NCAA - University of New England Nor'easters)

- Sam Hinse 'A' 2007-2011
- Tyler Gramatovich'A' 2008-2011
- Kevin Ruiz 2009-2011
- Brett Richards'C' 2009-2011

(ACAC - Concordia Thunder)

- Luke Milne 2008-2012
- Dan Hoyle 'A' 2008-2012
- Tyson Wright 'C' 2009-2012
- Dan Cordeiro 'A' 2009-2013
- Wes Walkeden 'C' 2008-2013
- Michael Figgures 2009-2013
- Evan Tordiff 2012-2013
- Luke Molyneaux 2012-2013
- Cole Porter 2012-2013

(SJHL - LaRonge Ice Wolves) (CIS - Wilfrid Laurier University Golden Hawks)

- Brett Arnston 'C' 2010-2014
- Kenny Wood-Schatz 2011-2014
- Max McRae 2011-2014
- Kyle Kramar 'A' 2011-2014
- Keagan Gorda 'A' 2012-2015
- Hayden McReynolds 2013-2015
- Josh Klein 'A' 2013-2015
- Cody Lunnin 'A' 2012-2016
- Brett Rossi 2013-2016
- Jordan Martin 'C' 2012-2016
- Keaton Twohey 2012-2016
- Mitch Vigneau 2013-2017
- Brent Vigneau 'A' 2013-2017

== Award History ==
Most Valuable Player - Gary Koehli Award

- 2016 - #91 Brent Vigneau
- 2015 - #34 Mitch Vigneau
- 2014 - #11 Keagan Gorda
- 2013 - #11 Keagan Gorda
- 2012 - #11 Keagan Gorda
- 2011 - #10 Tyler Gramatovich
- 2010 - #14 Dan Hoyle
- 2009 - #1 Casey McGillivray

Most Points in the Regular Season

- 2016 - #91 Brent Vigneau - 33 PTS / 35 GP
- 2015 - #15 Gage Gorda - 65 PTS / 38 GP
- 2014 - #11 Keagan Gorda - 47 PTS / 34 GP
- 2013 - #11 Keagan Gorda - 66 PTS / 36 GP
- 2012 - #11 Keagan Gorda - 56 PTS / 38 GP
- 2011 - #10 Tyler Gramatovich - 52 PTS / 37 GP
- 2010 - #14 Dan Hoyle & #9 Michel Chalifoux - 36 PTS / 37 GP
- 2009 - #10 Tyler Gramatovich

Most Outstanding Defenseman

- 2016 - #5 Clayton Johnson
- 2015 - #5 Clayton Johnson & #17 Blade Foster
- 2014 - #44 Jordan Martin
- 2013 - #44 Jordan Martin
- 2012 - #25 Wes Walkeden & #12 Tyson Wright

Rookie of the Year Award - Dan Frogner Trophy

- 2016 - #11 Chance Herrington
- 2015 - #88 Justin Miller
- 2014 - # 1 Mitch Vigneau
- 2013 - #12 Jeff Bronetto
- 2012 - #11 Keagan Gorda - CJHL Rookie of the Year
- 2011 - #22 Dan Ketsa
- 2010 - #88 Dan Cordiero
- 2009 - #24 Rob Rudd

Most Improved Player

- 2016 - #14 Dallas Scarlett
- 2015 - #8 Dylan Kulmatycki
- 2014 - #91 Brent Vigneau
- 2013 - #88 Eli Gallinger
- 2012 - #5 Michael Brice

Unsung Hero Award

- 2016 - #37 Brett Young
- 2015 - #91 Brent Vigneau
- 2014 - #44 Jordan Martin
- 2013 - #91 Luke Molyneaux
- 2011 - #16 Brett Richards
- 2010 - #44 Joel Henriksen

Most Sportsmanlike Player - Glenn Worrell Trophy

- 2015 - #44 Jordan Martin - 2 PIM / 33 Gms
- 2014 - #17 Max McRae - 2 PIM / 24 Gms
- 2013 - #88 Eli Gallinger - 0 PIM / 35 Gms
- 2012 - #6 Matt Ohrt - 4 PIM / 30 Gms
- 2011 - #16 Brett Richards 'C' - CJHL Most Sportsmanlike Player - 2 PIM / 38 Gms
- 2010 - #88 Dan Cordiero - 6 PIM / 37 Gms
- 2009 - #44 Joel Henriksen

Playoff Most Valuable Player

- 2015 - #16 Nic Moulding
- 2014 - #1 Mitch Vigneau
- 2010 - #1 Casey McGillivray

Scholastic Player of the Year

- 2015 - #11 Keagan Gorda - Charles S. Noble Scholarship
- 2014 - #5 Jarrett Belliveau - Friends of the AJHL Scholarship Recipient
- 2013 - #33 Micheal Figgures - Friends of the AJHL Scholarship Recipient
- 2012 - #88 Dan Cordeiro
- 2011 - #88 Dan Cordeiro
- 2010 - #7 John Hampton
- 2009 - #7 John Hampton

Scholastic Awards

- 2015 - #11 Keagan Gorda, #12 Cody Lunnin, #15 Gage Gorda, #44 Jordan Martin
- 2012 - #88 Dan Cordiero, #3 Khenan Rutsch, #9 Kyle Kramar & #33 Michael Figgures
- 2011 - #88 Dan Cordiero
- 2010 - #7 John Hampton, #10 Tyler Gramatovich, #16 Brett Richards & #91 Luke Milne
- 2009 - #7 John Hampton & #9 Michel Chalifoux

== Individual Season Records ==
Stats only available from 2009-2016/17 Season

Best Save % in a Single Season

- 0.926 - #34 Mitch Vigneau (2014/15)
- 0.912 - #34 Mitch Vigneau (2013/14)
- 0.907 - #34 Mitch Vigneau (2016/17)
- 0.905 - #29 Joe Mandrusiak (2011/12)
- 0.904 - #33 Robbie Lloyd (2012/13)
- 0.901 - #33 Michael Figgures (2012/13)
- 0.887 - #33 Robbie Lloyd (2013/14)
- 0.885 - #33 Michael Figgures (2011/12)

Lowest G.A.A. in the Regular Season

- 2.66 - #34 Mitch Vigneau (2014/15)
- 3.56 - #01 Joe Mandrusiak (2011/12)
- 3.59 - #34 Mitch Vigneau (2013/14)
- 3.68 - #34 Mitch Vigneau (2016/17)
- 3.96 - #33 Michael Figgures (2011/12)
- 4.15 - #1 Casey McGillivray (2009/10)

Most Saves in a Single Game

- 59 - #1 Casey McGillivray (2009/10 - 124:01 mins)
- 52 - #1 Casey McGillivray (2009/10 - 91:03 mins)
- 50 - #29 Joe Mandrusiak (2011/12 - 60:00 mins)

Most Wins in the Regular Season

- 18 - #34 Mitch Vigneau (2014/15)
- 11 - #34 Mitch Vigneau (2016/17)
- 11 - #33 Michael Figgures (2010/11)
- 8 - #1 Casey McGillivray (2009/10)
- 8 - #29 Jesse Melnychyn (2010/11)
- 8 - #34 Mitch Vigneau (2013/14)

Most Assists in the Regular Season

- 35 - #15 Gage Gorda (F) (2014/15)
- 31 - #11 Keagan Gorda (F) (2014/15)
- 31 - #11 Keagan Gorda (F) (2012/13)
- 27 - #11 Keagan Gorda (F) (2011/12)
- 24 - #84 Dan Cordeiro (F) (2011/12)
- 24 - #25 Wes Walkeden (D) (2010/11)
- 24 - #11 Keagan Gorda (F) (2013/14)
- 24 - #08 Dylan Kulmatycki (F) (2016/17)
- 22 - #44 Jordan Martin (D) (2014/15)
- 22 - #84 Dan Cordiero (F) (2012/13)

Most Goals in the Regular Season

- 35 - #11 Keagan Gorda (F) (2011/12)
- 34 - #10 Tyler Gramatovich (F) (2010/11)
- 30 - #15 Gage Gorda (F) (2014/15)
- 26 - #84 Dan Cordiero (F) (2012/13)
- 23 - #11 Keagan Gorda (F) (2014/15)
- 23 - #11 Keagan Gorda (F) (2013/14)

Most Points in the Regular Season

- 66 - #11 Keagan Gorda (F) (2012/13)
- 65 - #15 Gage Gorda (F) (2014/15)
- 56 - #11 Keagan Gorda (F) (2011/12)
- 54 - #10 Tyler Gramatovich (F) (2010/11)
- 54 - #11 Keagan Gorda (F) (2014/15)
- 48 - #84 Dan Cordiero (F) (2012/13)
- 47 - #11 Keagan Gorda (F) (2013/14)
- 40 - #84 Dan Cordeiro (F) (2011/12)

Most PIM in the Regular Season

- 207 - #16 Aaron Tiessen (F) (2013/14)
- 175 - #18 Brett Arnston (F) (2011/12)
- 171 - #22 Dan Ketsa (F) (2010/11)
- 167 - #18 Brett Arnston (F) (2013/14)
- 161 - #11 Kevin Ruiz (F) (2009/10)
- 146 - #4 Josh Klein (D) (2014/15)
- 142 - #25 Wes Walkeden (D) (2009/10)

== Individual Career Records ==
Stats only available from 2009-2016/17 Season

Save %

- 0.907 - #34 Mitch Vigneau (2013–2017)
- 0.875 - #1 Jacob Suppes (2014-2015)
- 0.866 - #1 Kit Liske (2015–present)
- 0.743 - #33 Robbie Lloyd (2011-2014)

GAA

- 3.61 - #34 Mitch Vigneau (2013-2017)
- 4.09 - #1 Casey McGillivray (2009-2010)
- 4.20 - #29 Joe Mandrusiak (2010-2012)
- 4.49 - #1 Jacob Suppes (2014-2015)
- 4.59 - #33 Michael Figgures (2009-2013)
- 4.65 - #29 Jesse Melnychyn (2010-2011)
- 4.80 - #33 Robbie Lloyd (2011-2014)
- 5.64 - #1 Kit Liske (2015–present)

Wins

- 51 - #34 Mitch Vigneau (2013-2017)
- 31 - #33 Michael Figgures (2009-2013)
- 14 - #33 Robbie Lloyd (2011-2014)
- 9 - #1 Casey McGillivray (2009-2010)
- 7 - #29 Jesse Melnychyn (2010-2011)
- 6 - #29 Joe Mandrusiak (2010-2012)
- 3 - #1 Jacob Suppes (2014-2015)

Assists (Minimum 50)

- 122 - #11 Keagan Gorda (F) (2011-2015)
- 79 - #84 Dan Cordeiro (F) (2009-2013)
- 59 - #44 Jordan Martin (D) (2012-2016)
- 59 - #08 Dylan Kulmatycki (F) (2014–present)
- 58 - #25 Wes Walkeden (D) (2009-2013)
- 53 - #91 Brent Vigneau (F) (2013-2017)
- 51 - #15 Gage Gorda (F) (2013-2015)
- 50 - #12 Tyson Wright (D) (2009-2012)

Goals (Minimum 30)

- 116 - #11 Keagan Gorda (F) (2011-2015)
- 67 - #84 Dan Cordeiro (F) (2009-2013)
- 51 - #10 Tyler Gramatovich (F) (2009-2011)
- 45 - #15 Gage Gorda (F) (2013-2015)
- 41 - #14 Dan Hoyle (F) (2009-2012)
- 37 - #91 Brent Vigneau (F) (2013-2017)
- 33 - #22 Dan Ketza (F) (2010-2014)
- 31 - #08 Dylan Kulmatycki (F) (2014–present)
- 30 - #76 Keaton Twohey (F) (2012-2016)

Points (Minimum 70)

- 238 - #11 Keagan Gorda (F) (2011-2015)
- 146 - #84 Dan Cordeiro (F) (2009-2013)
- 97 - #15 Gage Gorda (F) (2013-2015)
- 90 - #91 Brent Vigneau (F) (2013-2017)
- 90 - #08 Dylan Kulmatycki (F) (2014–present)
- 86 - #10 Tyler Gramatovich (F) (2009-2011)
- 82 - #25 Wes Walkeden (D) (2009-2013)
- 80 - #14 Dan Hoyle (F) (2009-2012)
- 72 - #44 Jordan Martin (D) (2012-2016)
- 70 - #12 Tyson Wright (D) (2009-2012)

Games Played (Minimum 120)

- 156 - #84 Dan Cordeiro (F) (2009-2013)
- 153 - #44 Jordan Martin (D) (2012-2016)
- 146 - #11 Keagan Gorda (F) (2011-2015)
- 143 - #91 Brent Vigneau (F) (2013-2017)
- 145 - #25 Wes Walkeden (D) (2009-2013)
- 129 - #12 Cody Lunnin (D) (2012-2016)
- 124 - #34 Mitch Vigneau (G) (2013-2017)
- 121 - #18 Brett Arnston (F) (2010-2014)
- 121 - #12 Tyson Wright (D) (2009-2012)
- 120 - #05 Clayton Johnson (D) (2014–present)

Penalty Minutes (Minimum 250)

- 649 - #18 Brett Arnston (F) (2010-2014)
- 477 - #25 Wes Walkeden (D) (2009-2013)
- 419 - #22 Dan Ketza (F) (2010-2014)
- 382 - #12 Cody Lunnin (D) (2012-2016)
- 330 - #12 Tyson Wright (D) (2009-2012)
- 276 - #16 Nic Moulding (F) (2014-2016)
- 269 - #14 Michael Scott (F) (2009-2013)
- 252 - #91 Brent Vigneau (F) (2013-2017)
- 251 - #88 Kenny Wood-Schatz (F) (2011-2014)

== Team Records ==
Longest Playoff Games

- 124.01 - Knights (3) @ Bruins (4) (02/15/2010 - Longest Game in CJHL History )
- 91.03 - Bruins (4) @ Chiefs (3) (2/23/2010 - 6 periods)

Most Wins in the Regular Season

- 20 - Strathcona Bruins (2010/11 - Head Coach: Derek Sweet-Coulter)
- 18 - Strathcona Bruins (2014/15 - Head Coach - Derek Hemsley)
- 17 - Strathcona Bruins (2013/14 - Head Coach: Derek Hemsley)
- 16 - Strathcona Bruins (2011/12 - Head Coach: Derek Sweet-Coulter)
- 14 - Strathcona Bruins (2012/13 - Head Coach: Derek Hemsley)
- 12 - Strathcona Bruins (2009/10 - Head Coach: Derek Sweet-Coulter)
- 12 - Strathcona Bruins (2016/17 - Head Coach: Bruce Leiter)

Goals Scored in the Regular Season

- 154 - 2010/11 Season
- 150 - 2012/13 Season
- 145 - 2013/14 Season
- 137 - 2011/12 Season
- 129 - 2014/15 Season
- 121 - 2009/10 Season
- 113 - 2016/17 Season
- 99 - 2015/16 Season

Fewest Goals Against in the Regular Season

- 136 - 2014/15 Season
- 156 - 2011/12 Season
- 162 - 2013/14 Season
- 171 - 2016/17 Season
- 173 - 2009/10 Season & 2010/11 Season
- 174 - 2015/16 Season
- 188 - 2012/13 Season

Most PIM's in the Regular Season

- 1676 - 2011/12 Season
- 1495 - 2013/14 Season
- 1473 - 2015/16 Season
- 1239 - 2010/11 Season
- 1116 - 2014/15 Season
- 1012 - 2009/10 Season
- 918 - 2012/13 Season
- 876 - 2016/17 Season

== CJHL History ==
"The Capital Junior Hockey League was established in 1972. At that time it was known as "Edmonton Metropolitan Junior Hockey League. Many excellent hockey players were leaving Alberta to play junior hockey elsewhere. Sometimes, their education and family life suffered, in other cases, "turned off" by the experience, they quit and returned home. A group of Edmonton and district businessmen felt that there was a need to offer an alternate choice. They planned a program that would be developmental and recreational, a program where players could develop hockey and life skills in harmony. A program that maintains a competitive brand of hockey with recreation value. The directors of the Capital Junior Hockey League feel they provide this environment. What more could be said about a junior hockey program where the players can live at home and play competitive junior hockey. In familiar surroundings, players can work, go to school, or attend any other academic institution. The Capital Junior Hockey League is proud that many of their players continued on in hockey. They are especially proud of the hockey environment their program extends to all the players and coaches. The Capital Junior Hockey league was incorporated in January 1973. The members were the U of A Junior Bears, South Side Athletic Club, North Side Club, Sherwood Park Knights, St. Albert Juniors, and the Fort Saskatchewan Hawks. Two of these are still members: Sherwood Park and Fort Saskatchewan."

Presidents

- 2007–Present Jim McAuley
- 1986-2007 Gary Bruce
- 1985-1986 Chris Deakin
- 1980-1985 Tom Meters
- 1975-1980 Dave Lilycrop
- 1973-1975 W.B Parker

== See also ==
- List of ice hockey teams in Alberta
