= Frog Lake T-Birds =

Canadian junior ice hockey team in Alberta

- City: Frog Lake, Alberta, Canada
- League: North Eastern Alberta Junior B Hockey League
- Founded: 2014
- Home arena: New Horizons Arena
- Colours: Green, yellow, white
- General manager: Wayne Dion
- Head coach: Kelly Zacharias
- Website: www.froglakejrbtbirds.com

Franchise history
- 2014–2019: Frog Lake T-Birds

The Frog Lake T-Birds are a Canadian junior B ice hockey team, based in Frog Lake, Alberta, Canada. They played in the North Eastern Alberta Junior B Hockey League, out of the New Horizons Arena. They were coached by Kelly Zacharias

== History ==
The Frog Lake T-Birds were founded in 2014, entering the North Eastern Alberta Junior B Hockey League. They finished 7th overall in their debut season. The T-Birds had to forfeit the quarterfinal playoffs due to challenges in fielding enough players. They were unable to return the following season.

== Season-by-season record ==
Season	GP	W	L	OTL	Pts	GF	GA	PIM	Finish	Playoffs
2014–15	36	14	21	1	29	164	224	1024	7th, NEAJBHL	Lost Quarterfinals, 1–4 (Ice)
2015–16	36	17	18	1	35	179	202	734	7th of 10, NEAJBHL	Lost Quarterfinals, 1–4 (Canadiens)
2016–17	36	23	13	0	46	216	145	1135	3rd of 10, NEAJBHL	Won Quarterfinals, 4–1 (Bandits); Lost Semifinals, 2–4 (Canadiens)
2017–18	36	21	13	2	44	163	149	824	4th of 10, NEAJBHL	Won Quarterfinals, 4–1 (Clippers); Won Semifinals, 4-2 (Wheat Kings); Lost League Finals 1-4 (Bisons)
2018–19	32	7	21	4	18	123	187	681	8th of 9, NEAJBHL	Lost Quarterfinals, 0-4 (Bisons)

== See also ==
- List of ice hockey teams in Alberta
