= Noralta Junior Hockey League =

- President: Chris Hurley
- Former name: North Central Junior Hockey League (1992–2003)
- Founded: 1992
- No. of teams: 14
- Recent champions: St. Albert Comets (2025)
- Most successful club: Edmonton Avalanche (5)
- Website: NJHL.ca

The Noralta Junior Hockey League is a Junior "C" ice hockey league in Alberta, Canada, sanctioned by Hockey Canada, under Hockey Alberta. It currently has 15 teams throughout the greater Edmonton area.

== History ==
The league was founded in 1992 as a non-contact juvenile league known as the North Central Junior Hockey League. The original two teams were located in St. Albert and Sherwood Park. The league added a team in Edmonton in 1993 on condition it would be a non-contact league. The league was back down to two teams in 1994.

Body contact and strict fighting rules were adopted for the 1995–96 season which attracted teams back. Teams from Drayton Valley, Edmonton Braves, St Albert Shooters and Thorhild competed in the circuits first full season. Provincial play was contested for the first time in 1996 with St Albert hosting a four-team provincial. Sexsmith Vipers were the first Hockey Alberta Junior C Provincial winner defeating Grande Prairie Wheelers in the final.

The circuit was reorganized for the 1996–97 season expanding to eight teams (Beaumont Braves, Calahoo, Fort Saskatchewan, Legal, Morinville Super C's, Paul Band, St. Albert Shooters and Thorhild),

St. Albert rebranded as the Mustangs for the 1997–98 while Fort Saskatchewan, Legal and Thorhild folded. Calahoo and Paul Band would fold after the 1998–99 season.

On January 18, 2001 the league held its first annual All-Star Game in memory of longtime local volunteer John Anderson.

The league was incorporated as the Noralta Junior Hockey League on December 22, 2003 as league membership grew to 13 teams.

In 2015 Noralta Junior Hockey League partnered with Friends of Alberta Junior Hockey Society to provide hockey players with scholarships to continue on to higher education after high school while staying in competitive ice hockey. Since its inception the scholarships have been given out on a yearly basis to many recipients.

The league added the New Sarepta Falcons to the league for the 2017–18 season. Fort Saskatchewan Jr. C Traders withdrew before that same season over speculation of the city getting a new Alberta Junior Hockey League team.

The Edmonton-based Junior Braves were added to the league for the 2018–19 season. Beaumont Buccaneers joined for 2021–22. In the 2022-23 season, three new teams were added (Millet Lightning, NEZ North Stars & Devon Bison). The Edmonton Wolverines joined for the 2025-26 season.

== Teams ==
Team	Centre	1st Season
St. Albert Comets	St. Albert	1992–93
SouthWest Zone Oil Kings	Edmonton	1999–00
Gibbons Broncos	Gibbons	2006–07
Seera Icemen	Edmonton	2006–07
Sherwood Park Renegades	Sherwood Park	2006–07
Edmonton Mavericks	Edmonton	2014–15
Junior Braves	Edmonton	2018–19
Strathcona Warriors	Strathcona	2020–21
Beaumont Buccaneers	Beaumont	2021–22
Devon Bison	Devon	2022-23
Millet Lightning	Millet	2022-23
NorthEast Zone Northstars	Edmonton	2022-23
CR Knights	Rivière Qui Barre	2023-24
North Edmonton Wolverines	Edmonton	2025-26
Parkland Flyers	Stony Plain	2026-27

== Champions ==
Typically the champion and two runners-up compete against the top three teams of the Calgary Junior C Hockey League for the Hockey Alberta Provincial Junior "C" title.

Year	League playoff champion	Provincial champion
1996	St. Albert Shooters	Sexsmith Vipers
1997	St. Albert Shooters	Calgary Southland (CJCHL)
1998	St. Albert Mustangs	---
1999	Beaumont Braves	---
2000	Morinville Super C's	Oyen Bees (CJCHL)
2001	Morinville Super C's	---
2002	Beaumont Braves	---
2003	St. Albert Blues	Springbank Rockies (CJCHL)
2004	RCAC Rivermen	Springbank Rockies (CJCHL)
2005	SWZ Oil Kings	SWZ Oil Kings
2006	SWZ Oil Kings	SWZ Oil Kings
2007	Millet Lightning	Springbank Rockies (CJCHL)
2008	Edmonton Ice	Sherwood Park Renegades
2009	SWZ Sentinels	Edmonton Ice
2010	Beaumont Braves	Seera Icemen
2011	Beaumont Braves	Beaumont Braves
2012	Edmonton Avalanche	Edmonton Avalanche
2013	Gibbons Broncos	Edmonton Avalanche
2014	Gibbons Broncos	Edmonton Avalanche
2015	Edmonton Avalanche	Edmonton Avalanche
2016	Edmonton Avalanche	Edmonton Avalanche
2017	SWZ Oil Kings	NEZ North Stars
2018	Edmonton Avalanche	Sherwood Park Renegades
2019	Edmonton Avalanche	Edmonton Avalanche
2020	Play suspended due to COVID-19 pandemic	---
2021	Season cancelled due to COVID-19 pandemic	---
2022	Gibbons Broncos	Springbank Rockies (CJCHL)
2023	SWZ Oil Kings	Calgary Wolverines (CJCHL)
2024	Edmonton Mavericks	Wolverines Jr HC (CJCHL)
2025	St. Albert Comets	Edmonton Mavericks (Noralta)
2026	Gibbons Broncos	Sherwood Park Renegades (Noralta)

=== Former teams ===
- Calahoo (1996–99)
- Drayton Valley (1996–97)
- Edmonton Avalanche (2009–2019)
- Edmonton Braves (1995–96) - relocated to Beaumont
  - Beaumont Braves (1996–2007; 2009–13)
- Edmonton Capitals (1997–??)
- Edmonton Ice (2006–13)
- Edmonton Firebirds (????–10)
- Edmonton Rivermen (2001–03) - renamed RCAC Rivermen
- Fort Saskatchewan (1996–97)
- Fort Saskatchewan Mustangs (1999–2007)
- Fort Saskatchewan Rangers (2013–2014) - renamed Jr. C Traders
  - Fort Saskatchewan Jr. C Traders (2014–17)
- Legal (1996–97)
- Millet Lightning (2006–14)
- Morinville Titans (2009–2019) - assumed original name Morinville Super C's
- New Sarepta Falcons (2017–19) - renamed New Sarepta Blades (2019–21)
- Northeast Zone Northstars (2006–20)
- Oil Capital Blades (2000–01) - renamed Edmonton Blades
  - Edmonton Blades (2001–??)
- Oil Capital Wildcats (1999–2001) - renamed Edmonton Wildcats
  - Edmonton Wildcats (2001–??)
- Paul Band (1996–99)
- RBQ Desperados (??–2007)
- St. Albert Shooters (1992–97) - renamed St. Albert Mustangs
  - St. Albert Mustangs (1997–02) - renamed St. Albert Blues
  - St. Albert Blues (2002–12) - renamed St. Albert Comets
- Seera Stealth (2009–16)
- Sherwood Park (1992–97)
- SouthWest Zone Sentinels (2007–11)
- SouthWest Zone Ice Kings (2014-25)
- Strathcona Sabres (~2002–08)
- Thorhild (1995–97)
- Wabamun Wings (2006–12)
