= Lloydminster Bandits =

- City: Lloydminster, Saskatchewan, Canada
- League: NEAJBHL
- Home arena: Cenovus Energy Hub
- Colours: Black, grey, red, white
- Head coach: Josh Dudding(2024)
- Website: www.lloydminsterbandits.com/

Franchise history
- 1991–present: Lloydminster Bandits

The Lloydminster Bandits are a junior "B" ice hockey team based in Lloydminster, Saskatchewan, Canada. They are members of the North Eastern Alberta Junior B Hockey League (NEAJBHL). They play their home games at Centennial Civic Centre, which lies on 49 Avenue, one block into Saskatchewan.

== History ==
Since the 1990–91 season, the Lloydminster Bandits have been the league champion 15 times including a 9 consecutive year run (1991–1999). As the league champion the team moves onto the Russ Barnes Trophy competition to challenge for the ALberta Provincial Jr. B Hockey Championship.

== Season-by-season record ==
Note: GP = Games played, W = Wins, L = Losses, OTL = Overtime Losses, Pts = Points, GF = Goals for, GA = Goals against, PIM = Penalties in minutes

Season	GP	W	L	OTL	Pts	GF	GA	PIM	Finish	Playoffs
2010–11	32	25	6	1	51	200	95	1015	2nd NEAJBHL	Lost in Finals, 0–4 (Ice)
2011–12	32	23	8	1	47	200	101	—	3rd NEAJBHL	Lost in Semifinals, 0–4 (Ice)
2012–13	34	17	13	4	38	156	134	—	4th NEAJBHL	Data missing
2013–14	34	21	7	6	48	164	74	—	3rd NEAJBHL	Lost in Semifinals, 2–4 (Bisons)
2014–15	36	20	13	3	43	161	109	1042	5th NEAJBHL	Won Quarterfinals, 4–3 (Canadiens); Lost Semifinals, 0–4 (Ice)
2015–16	36	13	20	3	29	113	152	702	8th of 10; NEAJBHL	Lost Quarterfinals, 0–4 (Bisons)
2016–17	36	18	16	2	38	129	151	1261	6th of 10; NEAJBHL	Lost Quarterfinals, 1–4 (T-Birds)
2017–18	36	16	18	2	34	146	167	1337	7th of 10; NEAJBHL	Lost Quarterfinals, 1–4 (Wheat Kings)
2018–19	32	14	17	1	29	115	134	1525	6th of 9 NEAJBHL	Lost Quarterfinals, 1–4 (Wheat Kings)
2019–20	32	13	17	2	28	119	133	1028	6th of 8 NEAJBHL	Lost Quarterfinals, 0–4 (Canadiens)
2020–21	4	1	3	0	2	12	24	199	Remaining Season Cancelled – COVID-19	
2021–22	34	6	28	0	12	109	203	1097	7th of 7 NEAJBHL	Lost Quarterfinals, 0–4 (Wheat Kings)
2022–23	31	17	12	2	36	144	112	741	5th of 8 NEAJBHL	Lost Quarterfinals, 0–4 (Canadiens)
2023–24	31	21	8	2	44	165	99	x	3rd of 8 NEAJBHL	Won Quarterfinals, 4–0 (Ice) lost Semifinals, 2–4 (Bisons)
2024–25	35	27	7	1	54	287	103	x	2nd of 8 NEAJBHL	Won Quarterfinals, bye Won Semifinals, 4–3 (Tigers); Lost League Finals 2–4(Bisons)
2025–26	36	30	6	0	60	203	106	x	1st of 7 NEAJBHL	Earned Quarterfinals, 4–1 (Wheat Kings); Won Semifinals, 4–1 (Wheat Kings); Won League Finals 4-0 (Tigers); NEAJHL CHAMPIONS (#15)

== Russ Barnes Trophy ==
Alberta Jr. B Provincial Championships

Year	Round Robin	Record	Standing	SemiFinal	Bronze Medal Game	Gold Medal Game
2002	W, Dawson Creek, 4–1; W, Beverly, 5–0; W, Stettler, 7–3	3–0–0	1st of 4, Pool	L, Okotoks, 1–4	Not played	—
2003	W, Edmonton, 4–1; W, Fort St. John, 6–1; L, Lacombe, 5–6	2–1–0	2nd of 4, Pool	L, Regals, 1–3	L, Okotoks, 5–7	—
2004	L, North Peace, 2–5; T, Beverly; T, Okotoks Bisons, 5–5	0–1–2	4th of 4, Pool	—	—	—
2009	L, Whitecourt Wolverines, 3–5; W, Stettler Lightning, 3–1; W, Fort Saskatchewan Hawks, 5–4	2–1–0	2nd of 4, Pool	W, Cochrane Generals, 5–1	—	W, Whitecourt Wolverines, 4–2; Gold Medal
2010	T, Beverly, 3–3; W, Red Deer, 5–2; T, North Peace, 3–3	1–0–2	2nd of 4, Pool	L, Whitecourt, 3–7	Not played	—
2026	L, Medicine Hat, 2-4; L La Crete, 2-7; L, Calgary, 3–6; L, Sherwood Park 3-6	0–4–0	6th of 6	-	-	—

== Keystone Cup ==
Western Canadian Jr. B Championships (Northern Ontario to British Columbia)
Six teams in round robin play – 1st vs 2nd for gold/silver & 3rd vs. 4th for bronze.

Year	Round Robin	Record	Standing	Bronze Medal Game	Gold Medal Game
2009	L, Richmond Sockeyes, 2–7; T, Saskatoon Royals, 4–4; L, Thunder Bay Wolverines, 3–7; W, Thunder Bay Northern Hawks, 6–1; W, St. Malo Warriors, 4–3	2–2–1	4th of 6	W, Saskatoon Royals 8–4; Bronze Medal	—

== NHL alumni ==
- Lance Ward

== Awards and trophies ==
Keystone Cup

- 1992–93
- 1994–95

Russ Barnes Trophy

- 1990–91
- 1992–93
- 1994–95
- 1996–97
- 1997–98
- 2008–09

NEAJBHL Championship

- 1990–91
- 1991–92
- 1992–93
- 1993–94
- 1994–95
- 1995–96
- 1996–97
- 1997–98
- 1998–99
- 2001–02
- 2002–03
- 2003–04
- 2008–09
- 2009–10

Top Defenseman

- Kodi Sawka: 2010–11

Most Valuable Player

- Ian McAllister: 2010–11

== See also ==
- List of ice hockey teams in Alberta
