= Brent Severyn =

Canadian ice hockey player (born 1966)

- Born: February 22, 1966 (age 60) Vegreville, Alberta, Canada
- Height: 6 ft 2 in (188 cm)
- Weight: 210 lb (95 kg; 15 st 0 lb)
- Position: Defence
- Shot: Left
- Played for: Quebec Nordiques; Florida Panthers; New York Islanders; Colorado Avalanche; Mighty Ducks of Anaheim; Dallas Stars
- NHL draft: 99th overall, 1984; Winnipeg Jets
- Playing career: 1988–2001

Brent Severyn (born February 22, 1966) is a Canadian former professional ice hockey defenceman who played in the National Hockey League (NHL) with six teams between 1989 and 1999.

== Playing career ==
Severyn was drafted 99th overall by the Winnipeg Jets in the 1984 NHL entry draft and played for the Quebec Nordiques, Florida Panthers, New York Islanders, Colorado Avalanche, Mighty Ducks of Anaheim and the Dallas Stars. Severyn's primary role with each of his teams was to be an enforcer. He finished his career with 10 goals, 30 assists, and 815 Penalty Minutes (PIM) in 328 regular season games. Severyn participated in the only NHL fight to have occurred in Japan. He was a member of the Stanley Cup-winning Dallas Stars in 1999. He had a two-year spell in the Deutsche Eishockey Liga in Germany with the Munich Barons and the Krefeld Pinguine before retiring in 2001.

== Personal life ==
Severyn works as a studio analyst for the Dallas Stars on Victory+. He is also a former radio color analyst for the Anaheim Ducks.

== Career statistics ==
=== Regular season and playoffs ===
			Regular season					Playoffs
Season	Team	League	GP	G	A	Pts	PIM	GP	G	A	Pts	PIM
1982–83	Vegreville Rangers	AJHL	21	20	22	42	10	—	—	—	—	—
1983–84	Seattle Breakers	WHL	72	14	22	36	49	5	1	2	3	2
1984–85	Seattle Breakers	WHL	26	7	16	23	57	—	—	—	—	—
1984–85	Brandon Wheat Kings	WHL	41	8	32	40	54	—	—	—	—	—
1985–86	Saskatoon Blades	WHL	9	1	4	5	38	—	—	—	—	—
1985–86	Seattle Thunderbirds	WHL	33	11	20	31	164	5	0	4	4	4
1986–87	University of Alberta	CIS	41	7	18	25	165	—	—	—	—	—
1987–88	University of Alberta	CIS	46	21	29	50	178	—	—	—	—	—
1988–89	Halifax Citadels	AHL	47	2	12	14	141	—	—	—	—	—
1989–90	Quebec Nordiques	NHL	35	0	2	2	42	—	—	—	—	—
1989–90	Halifax Citadels	AHL	43	6	9	15	105	6	1	2	3	49
1990–91	Halifax Citadels	AHL	50	7	26	33	202	—	—	—	—	—
1991–92	Utica Devils	AHL	80	11	33	44	211	4	0	1	1	4
1992–93	Utica Devils	AHL	77	20	32	52	240	5	0	0	0	35
1993–94	Florida Panthers	NHL	67	4	7	11	156	—	—	—	—	—
1994–95	Florida Panthers	NHL	9	1	1	2	37	—	—	—	—	—
1994–95	New York Islanders	NHL	19	1	3	4	34	—	—	—	—	—
1995–96	New York Islanders	NHL	65	1	8	9	180	—	—	—	—	—
1996–97	Colorado Avalanche	NHL	66	1	4	5	193	8	0	0	0	12
1997–98	Mighty Ducks of Anaheim	NHL	37	1	3	4	133	—	—	—	—	—
1998–99	Dallas Stars	NHL	30	1	2	3	50	—	—	—	—	—
1998–99	Michigan K-Wings	IHL	3	0	0	0	0	—	—	—	—	—
1999–00	Munich Barons	DEL	18	2	6	8	42	12	0	3	3	14
2000–01	Krefeld Pinguine	DEL	56	6	12	18	113	—	—	—	—	—
NHL totals			328	10	30	40	825	8	0	0	0	12

== Transactions ==
- June 3, 1991 – Traded from Quebec to New Jersey for Dave Marcinyshyn
- September 30, 1993 – Traded from New Jersey to Winnipeg for conditional draft pick
- October 3, 1993 – Traded from Winnipeg to Florida for Milan Tichy
- September 4, 1996 – Traded from New York Islanders to Colorado for third-round draft pick in 1997 draft (Francis Lessard)
