= Vermilion Tigers =

Vermilion Jr. Tigers
- City: Vermilion, Alberta, Canada
- League: North Eastern Alberta Junior B Hockey League
- Home arena: Vermilion Stadium
- Colours: Black, gold, White
- General manager: Dean Golinowski (2015–16)
- Head coach: Danny Haygarth (present)
- Website: Official website

Franchise history
- 1972–present: Vermilion Tigers

The Vermilion Tigers are a junior "B" ice hockey team based in Vermilion, Alberta, Canada. They are members of the North Eastern Alberta Junior B Hockey League (NEAJBHL). They play their home games at Vermilion Stadium.

== History ==
The Tigers are two-time Canadian Western Junior B Keystone Cup Champions. The first team from Alberta ever win the Keystone Cup, winning in 1984 and 1985.

== Season-by-season record ==
Note: GP = Games played, W = Wins, L = Losses, OTL = Overtime Losses, Pts = Points, GF = Goals for, GA = Goals against, PIM = Penalties in minutes

Season	GP	W	L	OTL	Pts	GF	GA	PIM	Finish	Playoffs
2010–11	32	17	14	1	35	150	142	726	6th, NEAJBHL	Lost in Quarterfinals, 1–3 (Rangers)
2011–12	32	16	13	3	35	160	120	—	6th, NEAJBHL	Lost in Quarterfinals, 1–3 (Bandits)
2012–13	34	17	16	1	35	138	126	—	5th, NEAJBHL	No playoff data available
2013–14	34	14	18	2	30	97	108	—	6th, NEAJBHL	Lost in Quarterfinals, 0–4 (Bandits)
2014–15	36	9	26	1	19	100	161	1410	9th, NEAJBHL	Did not qualify
2015–16	36	12	22	2	26	100	144	1017	9th of 10, NEAJBHL	Did not qualify
2016–17	36	13	20	3	29	105	131	1098	8th of 10, NEAJBHL	Lost Quarterfinals, 0–4 (Bisons)
2017–18	36	14	22	0	28	108	150	1546	8th of 10, NEAJBHL	Lost Quarterfinals, 0–4 (Bisons)
2018–19	32	9	21	2	20	91	159	1019	7th of 9, NEAJBHL	Lost Quarterfinals, 0–4 (Clippers)
2019–20	32	11	19	2	24	91	133	703	7th of 8, NEAJBHL	Lost Quarterfinals, 0–4 (Bisons)
2020–21	4	1	3	0	2	11	22	102	Remaining Season Cancelled – COVID-19	
2021–22	33	14	14	5	33	133	138	622	4th of 7, NEAJBHL	Won Quarterfinals, 4–1 (Ice); Lost Semifinals 0–4 (Bisons)
2022–23	31	23	6	2	48	180	86	558	1st of 8, NEAJBHL	Won Quarterfinals, 4–0 (Rangers); Lost Semifinals 2–4 (Canadiens)
2023–24	31	20	9	2	42	164	72	x	4th of 7, NEAJBHL	Won Quarterfinals, 4–0 (Wheat Kings); Won Semifinals 4–0 (Canadiens); Lost Finals, 2–4 (Bisons)
2024–25	35	25	9	1	50	240	74	848	3rd of 8, NEAJBHL	Won Quarterfinals, 4–0 (Rangers)
2025–26	36	28	5	3	56	177	75	x	2nd of 7, NEAJBHL	Earned Quarterfinals, bye Won Semifinals 4–1 (Bisons); Lost Finals, 0-4 (Bandits); Qualified to Russ Barnes

== Russ Barnes Trophy ==
Alberta Jr. B Provincial Championships

Year	Round-robin	Record	Place	Semifinal	Bronze medal game	Gold medal game
2026	OTW, CNHA Black, 5–4; L, Sherwood Park Knights, 1-2; L, La Crete Lumber Barons, 2-4; W, Medicine Hat Cubs, 10-1	1–2–1-0	4th of 6	Not played	Won, 5-2; Sherwood Park Knights	—

== NHL alumni ==
- Rich Healey
- Miles Zaharko

== Awards and trophies ==
NEAJBHL League Champions 2008

Coach of The Year

- Mike Applegate: 2006–07 & 2009–10
- Taylor Holt & Mark Hines: 2012–13

General Manager of the Year

- Darcy Fadden: 2010–11
