= Morinville Jets =

- City: Morinville, Alberta
- League: Capital Junior Hockey League
- Division: West Division
- Founded: 1977–78
- Home arena: Morinville Arena
- Colours: Blue, Red, White
- General manager: (Canada) Jerry Hills
- Head coach: (Canada) Trent Brown
- Website: www.morinvillejets.com

Franchise history
- 1977-present: Morinville Jets

The Morinville Jets are a Canadian Junior B ice hockey team located in Morinville, Alberta. They play in the Capital Junior Hockey League. Their head coach is Trent Brown.

== Recent history ==
The Morinville Jets were founded in 1977, and have enjoyed moderate success throughout their 38 years in the CJHL, but have never won the league title. The Jets hosted the 2012 CJHL All-Star Game in 2012. In September 2012, recent team grad and former captain Nick McRae was killed in an ATV accident near Edson. In honour of him, the team retired McRae's former number, 11. The Jets' closest geographical rival is the St. Albert Merchants, with whom they hold a fierce rivalry.

The Jets won their first league playoff championship during the 2024–25 season, going undefeated in their 3 rounds of playoffs. The Jets continued their winning ways by capturing the Alberta Jr. B Provincial Championships.

== Season-by-season record ==
Records as of April 17, 2015.

Season	GP	W	L	T	OTL	Pts	GF	GA	Finish	Playoffs
2008-09	38	22	16	0	0	44	169	166	3rd, West	N/A
2009-10	38	22	15	0	1	45	150	119	3rd, West	Lost in division semifinals, (Warriors)
2010-11	38	18	15	0	5	41	176	168	3rd, West	Lost in division semifinals, (Red Wings)
2011-12	38	24	11	0	3	51	160	117	2nd, West	Lost in division finals, (Regals)
2012-13	38	23	15	0	0	46	192	156	5th, West	Lost in 1st round, (Merchants)
2013-14	38	17	19	0	2	36	187	179	5th, West	Lost in 1st round, (Warriors)
2014-15	38	24	11	0	3	51	175	161	3rd, West	Lost in division semifinals, (Red Wings)
2015-16	38	15	20	0	3	33	150	166	5th, West	Won 1st Round, 2-0 (Warriors); Lost quarterfinals, 0-3 (Red Wings)
2016-17	38	27	7	0	4	58	188	123	1st of 7, West; 3 of 14 CJHL	Lost in division semifinals, 2-3 (Flyers)
2017-18	38	24	12	0	2	50	157	114	3rd of 7, West; 5 of 14 CJHL	Won 1st Round, 2-0 (Mustangs); Lost quarterfinals, 1-3 (Red Wings)
2018-19	38	20	16	0	2	42	155	136	3rd of 7, West; 7 of 14 CJHL	Won qualifying round, 2-0(Flyers); Lost in quarterfinals, 0-3 (Red Wings)
2019-20	38	14	23	0	1	29	119	167	5th of 7, West; 11 of 14 CJHL	Won 1st Round, 2-0 (Flyers); Lost quarterfinals, 1-4 (Red Wings)
2020-21	2	0	2	0	0	0	2	9	Remainder of Season	Cancelled due to Covid
2021-22	38	24	12	0	2	50	174	120	3rd of 7, West; 5 of 14 CJHL	Won 1st Round, 2-0 (Regals); Won quarterfinals, 3-1 (Warriors); Lost semifinals, 3-4 (Chiefs)
2022-23	38	28	9	0	1	57	209	127	2nd of 7, West; 3 of 14 CJHL	Lost quarterfinals, 0-3 (Red Wings)
2023-24	38	31	6	0	1	63	250	103	2nd of 7, West; 3 of 14 CJHL	Won Qualifying, 2-1 (Red Wings); Lost quarterfinals, 2-3(Merchants)
2024-25	38	31	6	0	1	63	216	117	1st of 7, West; 1st of 14 CJHL	Won quarterfinals, 3-0 (Red Wings); Won Semifinals 3-0 (Mustangs); Won League Finals 4-0 (Knights); League champions
2025-26	38	28	9	0	1	57	227	120	2nd of 7, West; 3 of 14 CJHL	Bye Qualifying; Won quarterfinals, 3-0 (Warriors); Won semifinals, 3 1 (Mustangs); Lost League finals, 3-4 (Knights)

== Alberta Jr. B Provincial Championships ==
Year	Round Robin	Record	Standing	Bronze Medal Game	Gold Medal Game	
2025	W, Fort St. John Huskies, 1–0; L, Wainwright Bisons, 1–6; W, Sherwood Park Knights, 5–2; W, Sylvan Lake Wranglers, 5–2	3-1–0	1st of 6	n/a	n/a	Won; GOLD Medal

== Staff ==
Morinville Jets staff:

- Head Coach - Trent Brown
- Assistant Coaches - Jeff Montina, Darwin Bozek, Cam Melville
- Trainer - Alyson Hodgson
- Equipment Manager - Lyle Burant
- Manager - Jerry Hills
- President - Brent Melville

== See also ==
- List of ice hockey teams in Alberta
