= Gord Mark =

Canadian ice hockey player (born 1964)

- Born: September 10, 1964 (age 61) Edmonton, Alberta, Canada
- Height: 6 ft 4 in (193 cm)
- Weight: 218 lb (99 kg; 15 st 8 lb)
- Position: Defence
- Shot: Right
- Played for: New Jersey Devils; Edmonton Oilers
- NHL draft: 105th overall, 1983; New Jersey Devils
- Playing career: 1986–1995

Gordon F. Mark (born September 10, 1964) is a Canadian former professional ice hockey defenceman. He was drafted in the sixth round, 105 overall, in the 1983 NHL entry draft. Mark played 85 National Hockey League games for the New Jersey Devils and Edmonton Oilers.

Mark was born in Edmonton, Alberta and raised in Irma, Alberta.

== Career statistics ==
			Regular season					Playoffs
Season	Team	League	GP	G	A	Pts	PIM	GP	G	A	Pts	PIM
1982–83	Kamloops Junior Oilers	WHL	71	12	20	32	135	7	1	1	2	8
1983–84	Kamloops Junior Oilers	WHL	67	12	30	42	202	17	2	6	8	27
1984–85	Kamloops Blazers	WHL	32	11	23	34	68	7	1	2	3	10
1985–86	Maine Mariners	AHL	77	9	13	22	134	5	0	1	1	9
1986–87	New Jersey Devils	NHL	36	3	5	8	82	—	—	—	—	—
1986–87	Maine Mariners	AHL	29	4	10	14	66	—	—	—	—	—
1987–88	New Jersey Devils	NHL	19	0	2	2	27	—	—	—	—	—
1987–88	Utica Devils	AHL	50	5	21	26	96	—	—	—	—	—
1992–93	Cape Breton Oilers	AHL	60	3	21	24	78	16	1	7	8	20
1993–94	Edmonton Oilers	NHL	12	0	1	1	43	—	—	—	—	—
1993–94	Cape Breton Oilers	AHL	49	11	20	31	116	5	0	2	2	26
1994–95	Edmonton Oilers	NHL	18	0	2	2	35	—	—	—	—	—
1995–96	Las Vegas Thunder	IHL	60	2	7	9	98	1	0	0	0	0
1996–97	Providence Bruins	AHL	7	0	1	1	36	—	—	—	—	—
1996–97	Utah Grizzlies	IHL	12	1	2	3	11	—	—	—	—	—
NHL totals			85	3	10	13	187	—	—	—	—	—

== Awards ==
- WHL West Second All-Star Team – 1984
