= Cold Lake Ice =

Ice hockey team in Alberta, Canada

- City: Cold Lake, Alberta
- League: NEAJBHL
- Home arena: Imperial Oil Place
- Colours: Black and white
- General manager: Scott Hood
- Head coach: Scott Hood
- Website: www.coldlakeice.com

Franchise history
- 2001–present: Cold Lake Ice

The Cold Lake Ice are a junior "B" ice hockey team based in Cold Lake, Alberta, Canada. They are members of the North Eastern Alberta Junior B Hockey League (NEAJBHL). They play their home games at the 1,800-seat Imperial Oil Place, located at the Energy Centre.

== Team info ==
Head coach and general manager is Scott Hood

=== Championships ===
The Ice have won three regular season and four playoff championships in their history. The Ice were four-time consecutive playoff champions from 2011–12 to the 2014–15 seasons.

== Season stats ==
=== 2010–11 season ===
This season saw the Ice reach the league finals for the first time in their history. They beat the Lloydminster Bandits to win the championship and advance to provincials.

=== 2011–12 season ===
The 2011–12 season saw the Ice finish up in second place during the regular season but surged through the playoffs to repeat as league champions.

=== 2012–13 season ===
This season saw the Ice complete a three-peat. The best showing to-date at the Russ Barnes Trophy winning the bronze medal with a 5–3 victory over the Red Deer Vipers from the Heritage Junior B Hockey League.

=== 2013–14 season ===
With the season still under way, the Ice finished the regular season with the best record in team history and finished the season first in the league. The Ice went on to win their fourth straight NEAJHL playoff championship and another trip to the Russ Barnes Championships. This season, Cold Lake failed to advance to the playoff round for the Russ Barnes Trophy.

== Season-by-season record ==
Note: GP = Games played, W = Wins, L = Losses, OTL = Overtime Losses, Pts = Points, GF = Goals for, GA = Goals against, PIM = Penalties in minutes

Season	GP	W	L	OTL	Pts	GF	GA	PIM	Finish	Playoffs
2010–11	33	29	2	1	59	230	81	923	1st, NEAJBHL	NEAJBHL Champions, 4–0 (Bandits)
2011–12	32	25	6	1	51	236	78	—	2nd, NEAJBHL	NEAJBHL Champions, 4–0 (Wheat Kings)
2012–13	34	29	4	1	59	218	89	—	1st, NEAJBHL	NEAJBHL Champions, 4–1 (Bisons)
2013–14	34	31	2	1	63	208	91	1617	1st, NEAJBHL	NEAJBHL Champions, 4–0 (Bandits)
2014–15	36	29	7	0	58	223	104	1443	2nd, NEAJBHL	Won Quarterfinals, 4–0 (T-Birds); Won Semifinals, 4–0 (Wheat Kings); Won League Finals, 4–2 (Bisons); NEAJBHL Champions
2015–16	36	19	13	4	42	156	138	1281	4th of 10, NEAJBHL	Won Quarterfinals, 4–1 (Border Chiefs); Lost Semifinals, 0–4 (Bisons)
2016–17	36	17	14	5	39	220	95	1133	5th of 10, NEAJBHL	Lost Quarterfinals, 0–4 (Wheat Kings)
2017–18	36	16	17	3	35	137	134	723	6th of 10, NEAJBHL	Won Quarterfinals, 4–3 (Canadiens); Lost Semifinals, 0–4 (Bisons)
2018–19	32	15	16	1	31	119	113	524	5th of 9, NEAJBHL	Lost Quarterfinals, 2-4 (Canadiens)
2019–20	32	14	16	2	30	112	130	712	5th of 8, NEAJBHL	Won Quarterfinals, 4-2 (Wheat Kings); Lost Semifinals 1-4 (Clippers)
2020–21	4	1	3	0	2	14	16	76	Remaining Season Cancelled Due to the COVID-19 pandemic	
2021–22	34	14	17	3	31	116	136	737	5th of 7 NEAJBHL	Lost Quarterfinals, 1-4 (Tigers)
2022–23	31	11	18	2	23	103	147	809	6th of 8 NEAJBHL	Lost Quarterfinals, 0-3 (Wheat Kings)
2023–24	31	12	17	2	26	132	142	x	6th of 8 NEAJBHL	Lost Quarterfinals, 0-4 (Bandits)
2024–25	35	15	20	0	30	127	149	x	5th of 8 NEAJBHL	Lost Quarterfinals, 0-4 (Canadiens)
2025–26	36	13	21	2	26	108	148	x	5th of 8 NEAJBHL	Lost Quarterfinals, 0-3 (Bisons)

== Russ Barnes Trophy ==
Alberta Jr. B Provincial Championships

Season	Round-robin	Record	Standing	Semifinal	Bronze medal game	Gold medal game
2011	L, Blackfalds Wranglers, 5–6; T, Leduc Riggers 3–3; L, Whitecourt Wolverines, 3–5	0–2–1	4th of 4, Pool B	—	—	—
2012	T, Calgary Royals Blue, 5–5; T, Blackfalds Wranglers, 3–3; L, Edmonton Royals, 3–6	0–1–2	4th of 4, Pool B	—	—	—
2013	W, Wetaskiwin Icemen, 7–4; W, Red Deer Vipers, 5–4; W, Grande Prairie Kings, 6–5	3–0–0	1st of 4, Pool B	L, Sherwood Park Knights, 1–5	W, Red Deer Vipers, 5–3; Bronze Medal	—
2014	L, Fort Saskatchewan Hawks, 2–4; W, Grande Prairie Kings, 5–3; L, Blackfalds Wranglers, 1–2	1–2–0	4th of 4, Pool B	—	—	—
2015	L, North Peace Navigators, 3–9; L, Stony Plain Flyers, 1–2; T, Blackfalds Wranglers, 2–2	0–2–1	4th of 4, Pool	—	—	—

== Keystone Cup ==
Western Canadian Jr. B Championships (Northern Ontario to British Columbia)
Six teams in round robin play. 1st vs. 2nd for gold/silver & 3rd vs. 4th for bronze.

Season	Round-robin	Record	Standing	Bronze medal game	Gold medal game
2015; Host	T, North Edmonton Red Wings, 2–2; L, Campbell River Storm, 2–4; L, Thunder Bay Northern Hawks, 1–3; W, Selkirk Fishermen, 10–0; L, Saskatoon Quakers, 0–5	1–3–1	5th of 6	—	—

== Awards and trophies ==
NEAJBHL Championship

- 2010–11

Goaltender of the Year

- Dustin Hyde: 2010–11

Most Gentlemanly

- Sean Joly: 2010–11

Rookie of the Year

- Dallas Ansell: 2010–11

== See also ==
- List of ice hockey teams in Alberta
