= Kyle Freadrich =

Canadian ice hockey player

- Born: December 28, 1978 (age 47) Edmonton, Alberta, Canada
- Height: 6 ft 6 in (198 cm)
- Weight: 250 lb (113 kg; 17 st 12 lb)
- Position: Left wing
- Shot: Left
- Played for: Tampa Bay Lightning
- NHL draft: 64th overall, 1997; Vancouver Canucks
- Playing career: 1998–2001

Kyle Freadrich (born December 28, 1978) is a Canadian former professional ice hockey player who played for the Tampa Bay Lightning of the NHL. He also played with several minor league teams, including the Syracuse Crunch, Louisiana IceGators, and Detroit Vipers. Prior to beginning his professional career, Freadrich played with the Regina Pats and Prince George Cougars or the WHL.

== Career statistics ==
=== Regular season and playoffs ===
			Regular season					Playoffs
Season	Team	League	GP	G	A	Pts	PIM	GP	G	A	Pts	PIM
1996–97	Prince George Cougars	WHL	12	0	0	0	12	—	—	—	—	—
1996-97	Regina Pats	WHL	50	1	3	4	152	4	0	0	0	8
1997–98	Regina Pats	WHL	62	6	5	11	259	9	0	1	1	25
1998–99	Louisiana IceGators	ECHL	5	0	0	0	17	4	0	0	0	2
1998–99	Regina Pats	WHL	52	2	2	4	215	—	—	—	—	—
1998–99	Syracuse Crunch	AHL	5	0	0	0	20	—	—	—	—	—
1999–00	Louisiana IceGators	ECHL	3	0	0	0	17	—	—	—	—	—
1999–00	Tampa Bay Lightning	NHL	10	0	0	0	39	—	—	—	—	—
1999–00	Detroit Vipers	IHL	45	0	1	1	203	—	—	—	—	—
2000–01	Tampa Bay Lightning	NHL	13	0	1	1	36	—	—	—	—	—
2000–01	Detroit Vipers	IHL	29	3	3	6	120	—	—	—	—	—
NHL totals			23	0	1	1	75	—	—	—	—	—
