= Calgary Junior Hockey League =

Canadian Junior "B" ice hockey league

Calgary Junior Hockey League (CalJHL)
- CalJHL
- Sport: Ice Hockey
- Founded: 1945
- Commissioner: Darryl Collister
- No. of teams: 8
- Country: Canada
- Headquarters: Calgary, Alberta
- Continent: North America
- Most recent champion: CBHA Rangers (2022)
- Most titles: CRAA Gold (9)
- Website: CJHL

The Calgary Junior Hockey League is a Junior "B" ice hockey league based in Calgary, Alberta, Canada. It is sanctioned by Hockey Canada, and operated by Hockey Calgary. Founded in 1945, the CJHL is one of the oldest hockey leagues operating in Alberta.

The league champion earns a berth in the Alberta Provincial Junior B Hockey Championship, with a chance to participate in the Western Canadian championship, the Keystone Cup.

== Teams ==
Team	Association
CBHA Hawks	Calgary Buffaloes Hockey Association
CBHA Rangers	Calgary Buffaloes Hockey Association
CNHA Gold	Calgary Northstars Hockey Association
CNHA Black	Calgary Northstars Hockey Association
CRAA Gold	Calgary Royals Athletic Association
CRAA Blue	Calgary Royals Athletic Association
NWCAA Bruins	Northwest Calgary Athletic Association
NWCAA Stamps	Northwest Calgary Athletic Association

== League Organization ==
The modern CJHL is governed by the by-laws of Hockey Calgary which stipulates that each of Calgary's four community hockey associations operate at least one team. Presently, each association operates two teams that play a 30-game season.

In the past, teams from outside the Calgary area have also participated in the league. Both the Okotoks Oilers and the High River Flyers of the Heritage Junior B Hockey League were originally members of the CJHL.

== 2006 incident ==
The CJHL gained national attention in October 2006 following a brawl in the hallway of a Calgary arena following a game between the NWCAA Bruins and the NEAA Canucks. A linesman attempting to break up an off-ice scuffle was allegedly knocked unconscious by a kick to the head in the melee, which involved players, coaches, fans and parents.

As a result of a police investigation, Robert Simard, 21, of Calgary was charged with one count of assault for allegedly kicking linesman Rory McCuaig in the head. Simard and one other player involved in the brawl were given two-year suspensions from playing in the league, ending their junior careers, and carrying over to any league sanctioned by Hockey Alberta. One parent was given a ban from all Hockey Calgary sanctioned arenas.

== Champions ==
Year	Champion	Year	Champion	Year	Champion
1987	**NWCAA Bruins**^{1}	2001	SWAA Royals Blue	2015	CRAA Gold
1988	NWCAA Bruins	2002	SWAA Royals Gold	2016	CRAA Gold
1989	CBHA Rangers	2003	SWAA Royals Gold	2017	CBHA Rangers
1990	**NWCAA Bruins**	2004	NWCAA Stampeders	2018	CBHA Rangers
1991	NWCAA Bruins	2005	**NWCAA Stampeders**	2019	CRAA Gold
1992		2006	NWCAA Stampeders	2020	covid
1993		2007	NWCAA Bruins	2021	covid
1994	SWAA Royals	2008	CRAA Gold	2022	CBHA Rangers
1995	SWAA Royals Blue	2009	CRAA Blue	2023	CBHA Rangers
1996	SWAA Royals Blue	2010	CRAA Blue	2024	NWCAA Stampeders
1997	NWCAA Stampeders	2011	CNHA Blazers	2025	NWCAA Stampeders
1998	NWCAA Bruins	2012	CRAA Blue	2026	CNHA Black
1999	SWAA Royals Gold	2013	CBHA Rangers		
2000	SWAA Royals Gold	2014	CRAA Gold		

-Alberta provincial champions listed in bold

^{1} Also won Keystone Cup Western Canadian Junior B Champion. Team members of the 1987 NWCAA Bruins included Ken MacLean, Chris Tibbles, Terry Copot (Coach), Neil Houghton, Brendan Black, Craig Wheeler, Steve Jordan, Craig Coulombe, Scott Muzychka, Ross Rayment, Barry Faminoff, Dan Matley, Jeff Hegland, Brad Thompson (Asst. Coach), Otto Gentile, Doug Thubron, John Irvine, Sandy Quilty, Blaine Louis, Brent Willis and Scott Burrell.

== See also ==
- List of ice hockey teams in Alberta
- Ice hockey in Calgary
