= Capital Junior Hockey League =

Ice hockey league in Alberta, Canada

- President: Keith Schultz
- Former name: Edmonton Metropolitan Junior Hockey League
- Founded: 1972
- Divisions: 2
- No. of teams: 14
- Recent champions: Morinville Jets (2024–25)
- Website: cjhl.org

The Capital Junior Hockey League is a Junior "B" ice hockey league in Alberta, Canada, sanctioned by Hockey Canada. The league was established in 1972 as the Edmonton Metropolitan Junior Hockey League.

League playoff winners face off against the winners of the other Alberta "B" leagues in the Alberta Provincial Junior B Hockey Championship. The Provincial winner earns the chance to compete for the Western Canadian Junior "B" Crown, the Keystone Cup.

== Teams ==
Division	Team	Centre
East	Beaumont Chiefs	Beaumont
East	Edmonton Royals	Edmonton
East	Fort Saskatchewan Hawks	Fort Saskatchewan
East	Leduc Riggers	Leduc
East	Sherwood Park Knights	Sherwood Park
East	Strathcona Bruins	Strathcona County
East	Wetaskiwin Icemen	Wetaskiwin
West	Beverly Warriors	Edmonton
West	Edmonton Mustangs	Edmonton
West	Morinville Jets	Morinville
West	North Edmonton Red Wings	Edmonton
West	Spruce Grove Regals	Spruce Grove
West	St. Albert Merchants	St. Albert
West	Stony Plain Flyers	Stony Plain

== Champions ==
Season	Champion	Provincial result	Keystone Cup result
1973	University of Alberta Junior Bears		
1974	Sherwood Park Knights	Gold Medalist	
1975	Waterloo Mercuries		
1976	Sherwood Park Knights	Silver Medalist	
1977	Leduc Riggers		
1978	Stony Plain Flyers		
1979	Stony Plain Flyers		
1980	Leduc Riggers		
1981	Leduc Riggers		
1982	Sherwood Park Knights		
1983	Sherwood Park Knights		
1984	Sherwood Park Knights		
1985	Stony Plain Flyers		
1986	Stony Plain Flyers		
1987	Leduc Riggers		
1988	St. Albert Merchants		
1989	Stony Plain Flyers	Bronze medalist	
1990	Beaumont Chiefs		
1991	Stony Plain Flyers		Bronze medalist
1992	Leduc Riggers	Gold Medalist	
1993	Leduc Riggers		
1994	Sherwood Park Knights	Gold Medalist	
1995	St. Albert Merchants		
1996	St. Albert Merchants		Silver medalist
1997	St. Albert Merchants		
1998	St. Albert Merchants		
1999	Edmonton Royals		Silver medalist
2000	Edmonton River Kings		Gold medalist
2001	Edmonton River Kings		
2002	Beverly Warriors		
2003	Spruce Grove Regals	Gold medalist	Silver medalist
2004	Beverly Warriors		
2005	St. Albert Merchants		
2006	Edmonton Royals	Silver medalists	
2007	North Edmonton Red Wings		
2008	Sherwood Park Knights	Gold medalist	Gold medalist
2009	Sherwood Park Knights	4th Place	
2010	Beverly Warriors		
2011	Beaumont Chiefs		
2012	Spruce Grove Regals		
2013	Sherwood Park Knights	Silver Medalist	
2014	Fort Saskatchewan Hawks		
2015	North Edmonton Red Wings	Gold medalist	Silver medalist
2016	North Edmonton Red Wings	Wetaskiwin Icemen^{1} Bronze Medalist	
2017	Wetaskiwin Icemen	Bronze Medalist	
2018	Wetaskiwin Icemen	Beverly Warriors^{1} Bronze Medalist	Alberta did not send rep to Keystone Cup
2019	Beverly Warriors	Wetaskiwin Icemen ^{1} Bronze Medalist	Alberta did not send rep to Keystone Cup
2020	Cancelled due to Covid-19		
2021	Cancelled due to Covid-19		
2022	Sherwood Park Knights	4th Place	
2023	Sherwood Park Knights	4th Place	Alberta no rep to Central Canada Cup
2024	St. Albert Merchants	Bronze Medalist	
2025	Morinville Jets	Gold medalist	Wetaskiwin Icemen - Silver Medalist
2026	Sherwood Park Knights	4th Place	

^{1}At Provincials as CJHL 2nd rep

== See also ==
- List of ice hockey teams in Alberta
