= Banff Academy Bears =

Banff Hockey Academy
- City: Banff, Alberta, Canada
- League: Heritage Junior B Hockey League
- Division: South
- Founded: 1994–95
- Home arena: Banff Recreation Centre
- Colours: Black, Vegas Gold, White
- General manager: (Canada) Billy Doherty
- Head coach: (Canada) Garry Unger
- Website: www.banffhockey.ab.ca/

Franchise history
- 1994-05: Banff Hockey Academy Icemen
- 2005-2017: Banff Hockey Academy Bears

The Banff Hockey Academy Bears were a Junior "B" Ice Hockey team based in Banff, Alberta, Canada. They are members of the South Division of the Heritage Junior B Hockey League (HJHL) as well as members of the Canadian Sport School Hockey League (CSSHL). They play their home games at Banff Recreation Centre.

The franchise elected not to participate in the 2017-18 Heritage Junior B Hockey League season.

== Season-by-season record ==
Note: GP = Games played, W = Wins, L = Losses, T = Ties, OTL = Overtime Losses, Pts = Points, GF = Goals for, GA = Goals against, PIM = Penalties in minutes

Season	GP	W	L	T	OTL	Pts	GF	GA	PIM	Finish	Playoffs
2004-05	37	11	26	0	0	22	142	255		6th, South	
2005-06	28	4	22	2	0	10	68	183	823	7th, South	Did not qualify
2006-07	36	7	22	1	6	21	113	196	1054	5th, Central	Did not qualify
2007-08	36	3	30	1	2	9	105	263	1043	8th, South	Lost Div. Semifinals, 0-3 (Thunder)
2008-09	36	10	23	2	1	23	136	205	955	6th, North	Lost Div. Semifinals, 0-2 (Thrashers)
2009-10	36	7	27	1	1	16	108	251	1146	5th, Central	Did not qualify
2010-11	36	5	27	4	0	14	97	212	969	5th, Central	Did not qualify
2011-12	38	4	30	0	4	12	116	260	-	7th, South	Did not qualify
2012-13	38	11	23	3	1	26	165	216	-	7th, South	Did not qualify
2013-14	36	23	12	-	1	47	148	135	-	2nd, South	Lost Div. Semifinals, 1-4 (Flyers)
2014-15	38	12	23	-	3	27	158	201	-	6th, South	Lost Div. Qualifier, 0-2 (Bisons)
2015-16	38	14	23	-	1	29	129	289	-	4th, South	Lost Div. Qualifier, 0-2 (Wheatland Kings)
2016-17	38	11	22	-	5	27	118	209	-	5th of 7, South; 10 of 14, League	Won Div. Qualifier, 2-0 (Wheatland Kings); Lost Div. Semifinal, 0-4(Generals)

== NHL alumni ==
- Matt Keith

== See also ==
- List of ice hockey teams in Alberta
