= Stettler Lightning =

- City: Stettler, Alberta, Canada
- League: Heritage Junior B Hockey League
- Division: North
- Home arena: Stettler Recreation Centre (occasionally at Big Valley Agriplex)
- Colours: Royal blue, black, silver, white
- General manager: (Canada) Trevor Wagner
- Head coach: (Canada) Trevor Wagner
- Website: www.stettlerlightning.com

Franchise history
- 199x–present: Stettler Lightning

The Stettler Lightning are a junior "B" ice hockey team based in Stettler, Alberta, Canada. They are members of the North Division of the Heritage Junior B Hockey League (HJHL). They play their home games at Stettler Recreation Centre. Occasionally the Lightning play home games at the Big Valley Agriplex in Big Valley, Alberta.

== Season-by-season record ==
Note: GP = Games played, W = Wins, L = Losses, T = Ties, OTL = Overtime losses, Pts = Points, GF = Goals for, GA = Goals against, PIM = Penalties in minutes

Season	GP	W	L	T	OTL	Pts	GF	GA	PIM	Finish	Playoffs
2004–05	39	14	21	3	1	32	165	199	—	6th, North	
2005–06	38	17	18	2	1	37	154	185	1232	4th, North	Lost in division semifinals, 0–4 (Vipers)
2006–07	36	20	14	1	1	42	197	147	1509	3rd, North	Lost in division semifinals, 1–3 (Vipers)
2007–08	36	27	7	1	1	56	214	109	802	1st, North	Lost in finals, 2–3 (Generals)
2008–09	36	26	9	0	1	53	177	117	1166	2nd, North	Lost in finals, 1–2 (Generals)
2009–10	36	13	21	2	0	28	135	159	956	3rd, North	Lost in division semifinals, 0–3 (Vipers)
2010–11	36	14	20	1	1	30	115	148	789	3rd, North	Lost in division semifinals, 1–3 (Vipers)
2011–12	38	14	21	2	1	31	122	157	—	6th, North	Did not qualify
2012–13	38	12	24	0	2	26	131	148	—	6th, North	Did not qualify
2013–14	36	24	11	—	1	49	148	116	—	2nd, North	Lost in division finals, 1–4 (Wranglers)
2014–15	38	14	20	0	4	32	120	155	—	6th, North	Lost in division qualifying, 1–2 (Colts)
2015–16	38	9	26	—	3	21	112	207	—	7th, North	Did not qualify
2016–17	38	18	17	—	3	39	167	183	—	5th of 7, North; 8 of 14, HJHL	Lost in division qualifying, 1–2 (Wranglers)
2017–18	38	16	17	—	3	35	174	175	—	5th of 7, North; 9 of 13, HJHL	Lost in division qualifying, 1–2 (Colts)
2018–19	38	17	14	—	7	41	158	142	—	4th of 8, North; 7 of 15, HJHL	Lost in division qualifying, 0–2 (Wranglers)
2019–20	38	11	24	—	3	25	119	193	—	5th of 7, North; 11 of 15, HJHL	Lost in division qualifying, 0–3 (Colts)
2020–21	4	4	0	—	0	8	35	11	—	Remaining season lost due to COVID-19	
2021–22	Not active this season										
2022–23	Not active this season										

== Russ Barnes Trophy ==
Alberta Jr. B Provincial Championships

Year	Round robin	Record	Standing	Semifinal	Bronze medal game	Gold medal game
2002	T, Beverly Warriors, 2–2; L, Dawson Creek Jr. Canucks, 2–6; L, Lloydminster Bandits, 3–7	0–2–1	4th of 4, pool	—	—	—
2009	L, Fort Saskatchewan Hawks, 2–4; L, Lloydminster Bandits, 1–3; L, Whitecourt Wolverines, 2–5	0–3–0	4 of 4, pool	—	—	—

== See also ==
- List of ice hockey teams in Alberta
