= Strathmore Wheatland Kings =

Agra Risk Wheatland Kings
- City: Strathmore, Alberta, Canada
- League: Heritage Junior B Hockey League
- Division: South
- Founded: 2008
- Home arena: Strathmore Family Centre
- Colours: Black, Gold, White
- Owner: Strathmore Minor Hockey (SMHA)
- General manager: Cody Holdaway
- Head coach: Doug Raycroft
- Website: www.wheatlandkings.com

Franchise history
- 2008–2024: Strathmore Wheatland Kings
- 2024–: Agra Risk Wheatland Kings

The Agra Risk Wheatland Kings (formerly known as the Strathmore Wheatland Kings) are a junior ice hockey team from Strathmore, Alberta, Canada. They compete in the Heritage Junior B Hockey League and are eligible to compete for the Russ Barnes Trophy and the Keystone Cup.

== History ==
The team was formed in 2008 and applied for a spot in the Heritage Junior B Hockey League for the 2008–2009 season. They were accepted and began to play in the league in September 2008. The franchise requested and were granted a leave of absence for the 2013–2014 season in order to re-organize. An agreement with Strathmore Minor Hockey (SMHA) paved the way for the team to return to the heritage league for the 2014–2015 season.

On April 20, 2024, the Strathmore Wheatland Kings announced a 5-year sponsorship agreement with Agra Risk Solutions and renamed their team to the Agra Risk Wheatland Kings.

== Season-by-season standings ==
Season	GP	W	L	T	OTL	GF	GA	P	Results	Playoffs
2008-09	36	10	20	4	2	115	164	26	8th HJBHL-South	did not qualify
2009-10	36	7	25	1	3	117	186	18	5th HJBHL-South	did not qualify
2010-11	36	14	20	1	0	131	143	29	4th HJBHL-South	lost Division Semi-Final, (Bisons)
2011-12	38	18	17	1	2	157	153	39	3rd HJBHL-South	lost Division Semi-Final, (Generals)
2012-13	38	17	19	1	1	182	150	36	4th HJBHL-South	lost Div. Qualifying (Generals)
2013-14	Team granted 1 year absence									
2014-15	38	15	19	-	4	154	170	34	5th HJBHL-South	Won Div. Qualifying 2-0 (Cubs); Lost Div. Semi-finals, 3-4 (Copperheads)
2015-16	38	13	23	-	2	142	184	28	5th HJBHL-South	Won Div. Qualifying, 2-0 (Academy Bears); Lost Div. Semi-finals, 0-4 (Generals)
2016-17	38	16	18	-	4	156	175	36	4th of 7, South; 9 of 14, HJBHL	lost Div. Qualifying 0-2 (Academy Bears)
2017-18	36	12	21	-	3	132	154	37	5th of 7, South; 10 of 13, HJBHL	Lost Div. Quarterfinals 0-2 (Flyers)
2018-19	38	18	17	-	3	154	148	39	4th of 7, South; 8 of 14, HJBHL	Lost Div. Quarterfinals 0-2 (Cubs)
2019-20	38	12	25	-	1	121	173	25	6th of 7, South; 11 of 14, HJBHL	Lost Div. Quarterfinals 1-3 (Cubs)
2020–21	2	1	1	–	0	8	13	2	Remaining season lost to COVID-19 pandemic	
2021-22	36	17	18	-	1	138	140	35	4th of 7, South; 6 of 14, HJBHL	Won Div. Quarterfinals 2-0 (Flyers); Lost Division Semifinals 1-4 (Bisons)
2022-23	38	18	18	-	2	125	138	38	4th of 6, South; 7 of 12, HJBHL	Won Div. Quarterfinals 2-1 (Copperheads); Lost Division Semifinals 0-4 (Bisons)
2023-24	38	18	17	-	3	134	128	39	6th of 6, South; 8 of 13, HJBHL	Did Not Qualify
2024-25	38	27	10	-	1	163	98	55	2nd of 6, South; 3rd of 13, HJBHL	Lost Div. Semifinals 1-3 (Cubs)
2025-26	36	22	12	-	2	135	105	46	2nd of 6, South; 5th of 11, HJBHL	Lost Div. Semifinals 1-3 (Generals)
