= Sylvan Lake Wranglers =

- City: Sylvan Lake, Alberta, Canada
- League: Heritage Junior B Hockey League
- Founded: WW2 Expansion year
- Home arena: NexSource Centre
- Colours: Teal, orange, black, white
- General manager: (Canada) Jesse Cheetham
- Head coach: Lloyd Cox

Franchise history
- 19xx–2007: Lacombe Wranglers
- 2007–2019: Blackfalds Wranglers
- 2019–present: Sylvan Lake Wranglers

The Sylvan Lake Wranglers are a junior "B" ice hockey team based in Sylvan Lake, Alberta, Canada. They are members of the North Division of the Heritage Junior B Hockey League (HJHL). They play their home games at Nexsource Center.

Prior to the 2007–08 season the team was known as the Lacombe Wranglers before re-locating to Blackfalds. The Wranglers have won five HJHL championships, three provincial titles (most of any HJHL team), and a Keystone Cup. For the start of the 2019-20 season, Blackfalds moved up to junior "A" hockey and Sylvan Lake became the home of the Wranglers.

The 2024-25 season was the first league playoff championship for Sylan Lake.

== Season-by-season record ==
Note: GP = Games played, W = Wins, L = Losses, T = Ties, OTL = Overtime Losses, Pts = Points, GF = Goals for, GA = Goals against, PIM = Penalties in minutes

Season	GP	W	L	T	OTL	Pts	GF	GA	PIM	Finish	Playoffs
2004–05	40	14	16	5	5	38	171	157	—	5th, North	
2005–06	38	19	14	4	1	43	176	163	1506	3rd, North	Lost in Division Finals, 0–4 (Vipers)
2006–07	36	28	6	0	2	58	235	126	1314	1st, North	HJHL Champions, 1–0 (Thunder); Russ Barnes Trophy Champions
2007–08	36	24	11	1	0	49	184	128	1074	3rd, North	Lost in HJHL Semifinals, 1–4 (Lightning)
2008–09	36	26	7	2	1	55	237	134	941	1st, North	Lost in HJHL Semifinals, 1–4 (Lightning)
2009–10	36	32	3	1	0	65	226	97	994	1st, North	HJHL Champions, 2–0 (Vipers)
2010–11	36	30	5	1	0	61	224	80	788	1st, North	Lost in Finals, 1–2 (Bisons); Russ Barnes Trophy Champions; Keystone Cup Champions
2011–12	38	22	12	3	1	48	184	129	—	1st, North	Lost in Div. Semi-Finals, (Thrashers)
2012–13	38	27	6	4	1	59	214	132	—	1st, North	Lost in North Finals, 3–4, (Vipers)
2013–14	36	24	9	—	3	51	194	132	—	1st, North	Lost in HJHL Finals, 2–3, (Bisons); Russ Barnes Trophy Champions; Keystone Cup Bronze Champions
2014–15	38	34	2	—	2	70	230	99	—	1st, North	Won Div. Semi-finals, 4–0, (Vipers); Won Div. Finals, 4–0 (Colts); Lost League Finals, 0–3 (Copperheads); Advance to Barnes Cup as runner up
2015–16	38	22	12	—	4	48	163	121	—	4th, North	Won Div. Qualifying, 2–0 (Thrashers); Lost Div. Semi-final, 0–4 (Colts)
2016–17	38	25	12	—	1	51	172	138	—	4th of 7, North; 6th of 14, HJHL	Won Div. Qualifying, 2–1 (Lightning); Lost Div. Semi-finals, 1–4 (Colts)
2017–18	38	22	12	—	2	46	167	117	—	3rd of 7, North; 6th of 13, HJHL	Won Div. Qualifying, 2–0 (Stampeders); Lost Div. Semi-finals, 1–3 (Thunder)
2018–19	38	14	18	—	6	34	148	159	—	5th of 8, North; 10th of 15, HJHL	Won Div. Qualifying, 2–0 (Lightning); Lost Div. Semi-finals, 0–4 (Thunder)
2019–20	38	23	13	—	2	48	135	116	—	3rd of 7, North; 7th of 14, HJHL	Won Div. Qualifying, 3-1 (Rams); WonDiv. Semi-finals, 4–3 (Vipers); Incomplete Finals 2-1 (Colts); Remaining playoffs cancelled due to covid
2020–21	4	0	4	—	0	34	5	15	—	Remaining season lost to COVID-19 pandemic	
2021–22	36	23	10	—	3	49	158	102	—	3rd of 7, North; 5th of 14, HJHL	Lost Div. Qualifying, 1-2 (Rams)
2022–23	38	25	9	—	4	54	166	124	—	1st of 6, North; 3rd of 12, HJHL	Won Div. Semifinals, 4-2 (Rams); Won Div. Finals, 4-2 (Thunder); Lost League Finals, 0-3 (Bisons); Advance to Russ Barnes; HJHL rep because Okotoks hosts
2023–24	38	33	3	—	2	68	217	88	—	1st of 7, North, 2nd of 13, HJHL	Won Div. Quarters, 3-0 (Thunder); Won Semifinal, 3-1 (Cubs); Lost League Finals, 2-4 (Bisons)
2024–25	38	34	3	—	1	69	220	57	—	1st of 7, North, 1st of 13, HJHL	Won Div. Quarters, 3-1 (Thunder); Won Semifinal, 3-0 (Vipers); Won League Finals, 3-1 (Bisons); Advance to Russ Barnes
2025–26	36	25	8	—	3	53	175	84	—	3 of 6, North; 3 of 12, HJHL	Won Semifinal, 3-2 (Colts); Lost Div. Final, 1-3 (Vipers)

== Russ Barnes Trophy ==
Alberta Jr. B Provincial Championships

Year	Round Robin	Record	Standing	SemiFinal	Bronze Medal Game	Gold Medal Game
2003	L, Fort St. John Huskies, 3–6; L, Edmonton River Kings, 2–4; W, Lloydminster Bandits, 6–5	1–2–0	4 of 4, Pool	—	—	—
2007	W, Saddle Lake Warriors, 8–4; W, St. Albert Merchants, 5–3; L, North Edmonton Red Wings	2–1–0	2 of 4, Pool	W, 12-6; Fort St. John Huskies	—	W, Spruce Grove Regals, 5–3; Russ Barnes Champions
2010	?, Whitecourt Wolverines; T, Beaumont Chiefs, 3–3 ?, Calgary Royals	Data missing		—	—	—
2011	W, Cold Lake Ice, 6–5; L, Whitecourt Wolverines, 4–9; W, Leduc Riggers, 4–3	2–1–0	2 of 4, Pool	W, 6-2; North Peace Navigators	—	W, Beaumont Chiefs, 2–1; Russ Barnes Champions
2012	L, Edmonton Royals, 2–4; T, Cold Lake Ice, 3–3; L, Calgary Royals, 4–5	0–2–1	4 of 4, Pool	—	—	—
2014	L, Grande Prairie Kings, 4–6; W, Fort Saskatchewan Hawks, 6–2; W, Cold Lake Ice, 2–1	2–1–0	2 of 4, Pool B	OTW, 5-4; St. Albert Merchants	—	W, Grande Prairie Kings, 6–0; Russ Barnes Champions
2015	W, Stony Plain Flyers, 3–6; L, North Peace Navigators, 0–5; T, Coaldale Copperheads, 2–2	1–1–1	2nd of 4, Pool	OTL, 4-5; North Peace Navigators	L, Fairview Flyers, 3–4	—
2023	L, Wainwright Bisons, 1-2; L, Okotoks Bisons, 0–4; W, CBHA Rangers, 5-4; L, Sherwood Park Knights, 4-6	1–3–0	6th of 6	n/a	n/a	n/a
2025	OTW, Wainwright Bisons, 3-2; W, Sherwood Park Knights, 5-2; OTW, NWCAA Stampeders, 4-3; L, Morinville Jets, 0-3	1–2–1-0	3rd of 6	n/a	W - 4-1; Fort St. John Huskies; Bronze Medalist	n/a

== Keystone Cup ==
Western Canadian Jr. B Championships (Northern Ontario to British Columbia)
Six teams in round robin play. 1st vs. 2nd for gold/silver & 3rd vs. 4th for bronze.

Year	Round Robin	Record	Standing	Bronze Medal Game	Gold Medal Game
2007	Alberta did not participate				
2011	L, Sherwood Park, 3–4; W, Pilot Butte, 8–1; W, Peninsula, 7–6; W, Arborg, 8–5; W, Thunder Bay, 11–0	4–1–0	2 of 6	—	W, Sherwood Park, 2–1; Keystone Cup Champion
2014	W, Saskatoon, 8–0; L, Abbotsford, 1–5; L, Beaver Valley, 1–5; W, Thunder Bay, 8–4; W, Selkirk, 6–3	3–2–0	3 of 6	W, Thunder Bay, 4–3; Bronze Medal	—

== See also ==
- List of ice hockey teams in Alberta

Preceded by Revelstoke Grizzlies	Keystone Cup Champions; 2011	Succeeded by Abbotsford Pilots
