= Normand Lacombe =

Canadian ice hockey player (born 1964)

- Born: October 18, 1964 (age 61) Montreal, Quebec, Canada
- Height: 6 ft 0 in (183 cm)
- Weight: 205 lb (93 kg; 14 st 9 lb)
- Position: Right wing
- Shot: Right
- Played for: Buffalo Sabres; Edmonton Oilers; Philadelphia Flyers
- NHL draft: 10th overall, 1983; Buffalo Sabres
- Playing career: 1983–1991

Normand Lacombe (born October 18, 1964) is a Canadian former professional ice hockey right wing. He was drafted in the first round, 10th overall, by the Buffalo Sabres in the 1983 NHL entry draft.

== Playing career ==
Lacombe was born in Montreal, Quebec and raised in Pierrefonds, Quebec. As a youth, he played in the 1977 Quebec International Pee-Wee Hockey Tournament with a minor ice hockey team from North Shore. After playing two seasons at the University of New Hampshire, Lacombe made his professional debut with Buffalo's American Hockey League affiliate, the Rochester Americans, in the 1983–84 season. Lacombe made his National Hockey League debut with the Sabres during the 1984–85 season, playing in 30 games. He appeared in 64 more games with the Sabres over the next two seasons before being traded, along with Wayne Van Dorp, to the Edmonton Oilers in exchange for Lee Fogolin and Mark Napier.

Lacombe was a member of the Oilers team which won the Stanley Cup in the 1987–88 season, and had the finest statistical season of his career in the 1988–89 season (17 goals, 11 assists). The Oilers traded Lacombe to the Philadelphia Flyers, where he would spend the final season-plus of his career, during the 1989–90 season.

In his NHL career, Lacombe appeared in 319 games. He scored 53 goals and added 62 assists. He also played in 26 playoff games, all with Edmonton, scoring five goals and tallying one assist.

== Coaching career ==
Lacombe was the head coach of the AJHL St. Albert Steel at the start of the 2007–08 season, but was fired shortly into the year and replaced by General Manager Greg Parks. He became the head coach of the Whitecourt Wolverines of the North West Junior Hockey League in the middle of the 2011–12 season, where he led the team to a league record fourth consecutive championship. In the off-season, the team folded to make way for the successor Whitecourt Wolverines of the Alberta Junior Hockey League, for which he is now the team's strength and conditioning coach.

== Awards and achievements ==
Award	Year
All-ECAC Hockey Second Team	1982–83

- 1987–88 - NHL - Stanley Cup (Edmonton)

== Career statistics ==
			Regular season					Playoffs
Season	Team	League	GP	G	A	Pts	PIM	GP	G	A	Pts	PIM
1979–80	Lac St-Louis Lions	QMAAA	42	20	33	53	40	5	4	4	8	0
1980–81	Lac St-Louis Lions	QMAAA	47	36	59	95	48	6	3	4	7	16
1981–82	University of New Hampshire	ECAC	35	18	16	34	38	—	—	—	—	—
1982–83	University of New Hampshire	ECAC	35	18	25	43	48	—	—	—	—	—
1983–84	Rochester Americans	AHL	44	10	16	26	45	—	—	—	—	—
1984–85	Buffalo Sabres	NHL	30	2	4	6	25	—	—	—	—	—
1984–85	Rochester Americans	AHL	33	13	16	29	33	5	3	1	4	4
1985–86	Buffalo Sabres	NHL	25	6	7	13	13	—	—	—	—	—
1985–86	Rochester Americans	AHL	32	10	13	23	56	—	—	—	—	—
1986–87	Buffalo Sabres	NHL	39	4	7	11	8	—	—	—	—	—
1986–87	Rochester Americans	AHL	13	6	5	11	4	—	—	—	—	—
1986–87	Edmonton Oilers	NHL	1	0	0	0	2	—	—	—	—	—
1986–87	Nova Scotia Oilers	AHL	10	3	5	8	4	5	1	1	2	6
1987–88	Edmonton Oilers	NHL	53	8	9	17	36	19	3	0	3	28
1988–89	Edmonton Oilers	NHL	64	17	11	28	57	7	2	1	3	21
1989–90	Edmonton Oilers	NHL	15	5	2	7	21	—	—	—	—	—
1989–90	Philadelphia Flyers	NHL	18	0	2	2	7	—	—	—	—	—
1990–91	Philadelphia Flyers	NHL	74	11	20	31	27	—	—	—	—	—
1991–92	Canada	Intl	11	1	4	5	16	—	—	—	—	—
AHL totals			132	42	55	97	142	10	4	2	6	10
NHL totals			319	53	62	115	196	26	5	1	6	49

Awards and achievements
Preceded by Don Sylvestri	ECAC Hockey Rookie of the Year; 1981–82	Succeeded by George Servinis
Sporting positions
Preceded by Tom Barrasso	Buffalo Sabres first-round draft pick 1983	Succeeded by Adam Creighton
