= High River Flyers =

- City: High River, Alberta Canada
- League: Heritage Junior B Hockey League
- Division: South
- Founded: 1920s (date to be confirmed)
- Home arena: Bob Snodgrass Recreation Complex
- Colours: Royal blue, orange, white
- General manager: Jeff Gardner
- Head coach: Jeff Gardner
- Website: www.highriverflyers.com/

Franchise history
- 2003-Present: High River Flyers

The High River Flyers are a junior "B" ice hockey team based in High River, Alberta, Canada. They are members of the South Division of the Heritage Junior B Hockey League (HJHL). They play their home games at Bob Snodgrass Recreation Complex.

== Season-by-season record ==
Note: GP = Games played, W = Wins, L = Losses, T = Ties, OTL = Overtime Losses, Pts = Points, GF = Goals for, GA = Goals against, PIM = Penalties in minutes

Season	GP	W	L	T	OTL	Pts	GF	GA	PIM	Finished	Playoffs
2004–05	37	17	16	2	2	38	212	195	—	5th, South	
2005–06	38	10	25	3	0	23	169	246	1311	6th, South	Did not qualify
2006–07	36	8	25	2	1	19	131	211	1172	5th, South	Did not qualify
2007–08	36	9	23	1	3	22	160	218	1637	7th, South	Lost Div. Semifinals, 0–3 (Cubs)
2008–09	36	14	20	1	1	30	130	200	1489	7th, South	Lost Div. Semifinals, 0–2 (Thunder)
2009–10	36	14	19	2	1	31	136	175	1882	4th, South	Lost Div. Semifinals, 1–3 (Bisons)
2010–11	36	14	15	3	4	35	167	176	1243	3rd, South	Lost Div. Semifinals, 0–3 (Copperheads)
2011–12	38	17	20	0	1	35	138	160	1320	5th, South	Lost in Preliminary Round, 0–2 (Copperheads)
2012–13	38	13	22	1	2	29	135	185	1062	6th, South	Did not qualify
2013–14	36	19	16	—	1	39	156	144	—	3rd, South	Lost Div. Finals, 2–4 (Bisons)
2014–15	38	10	28	—	0	20	108	185	—	7th, South	Did not qualify
2015–16	38	11	24	—	3	25	106	205	—	6th of 7, South; 11th of 14, HJBHL	Lost Elimination Round, 0–2 (Copperheads)
2016–17	38	9	27	—	2	20	118	207	—	7th of 7, South; 13th of 14, HJBHL	Did not qualify
2017–18	36	17	16	—	3	37	146	144	—	4th of 7, South; 7th of 13, HJBHL	Won Div Quarterfinals, 2–0 (Wheatland Kings); Lost Div Semis, 2-3 (Copperheads)
2018–19	38	12	21	—	5	29	107	166	—	6th of 7, South; 11th of 14, HJBHL	Lost Div. Quarters, 0-2 (Generals)
2019–20	38	14	20	—	4	32	163	162	—	5th of 7, South; 9th of 14, HJBHL	Won Div Quarterfinals, 3-2 (Copperheads); Lost Div Semis, 0-4 (Bisons)
2020–21	Did not have team active to start season										
2021–22	36	7	29	—	0	14	97	254	—	5th of 7, South; 12th of 14, HJBHL	Lost Div. Quarters, 0-2 (Wheatland Kings)
2022–23	38	6	29	—	3	15	102	201	—	6th of 6, South; 12th of 12, HJBHL	Lost Div. Quarters, 0-2 (Generals)
2023–24	38	20	15	—	3	43	175	134	—	5th of 6, South; 6th of 13, HJBHL	Won Div. Play In, 2-1 (Generals); Lost Div. Quarters, 1-3 (Bisons)
2024–25	38	12	21	—	5	29	119	184	—	6th of 6, South; 11th of 13, HJBHL	Did not qualify
2025–26	36	6	30	—	0	12	89	210	—	6th of 6, South; 11th of 11, HJBHL	Did not qualify

== See also ==
- List of ice hockey teams in Alberta
