= Slave Lake Wolves =

Former junior ice ockey team in Alberta, Canada

- City: Slave Lake, Alberta, Canada
- League: NWJHL
- Home arena: Arctic Ice Centre
- Colours
- General manager: (Canada) Leard Robertson
- Head coach: (Canada) Corey paleck
- Website: www.nwjhl.com/slavelakewolves

The Slave Lake Wolves were a Junior "B" ice hockey team based in Slave Lake, Alberta, Canada. They were members of the North West Junior Hockey League (NWJHL) and played their home games at Arctic Ice Centre.

The team temporarily ceased operations in 2011 as Slave Lake recovered from the 2011 wildfire, and therefore did not play in the 2011–12 season.

The team took a leave of absence due to lack of players prior to the 2014–15 season and have not returned.

== Season-by-season record ==
Note: GP = Games played, W = Wins, L = Losses, OTL = Overtime Losses, Pts = Points, GF = Goals for, GA = Goals against, PIM = Penalties in minutes

Season	GP	W	L	OTL	Pts	GF	GA	PIM	Finish	Playoffs
2008–09	35	11	23	1	23	118	200	1097	7th, NWJHL	
2009–10	35	11	22	2	24	116	180	1255	8th, NWJHL	Lost in Quarterfinals, 0-3 (Wolverines)
2010–11	35	8	27	0	16	86	202	908	8th, NWJHL	Lost in Quarterfinals, 0-3 (Wolverines)
2011–12	Temporarily ceased operations due to 2011 Slave Lake wildfire									
2012–13	35	17	18	0	34	133	166	—	4th, NWJHL	Lost in Quarterfinals, 0-3 (Huskies)
2013–14	35	7	22	5	21	130	213	—	6th, NWJHL	Lost in Quarterfinals, 0-3 (Huskies)
