= Beaverlodge Blades =

- City: Beaverlodge, Alberta, Canada
- League: North West Junior Hockey League
- Founded: 1997–98
- Home arena: Beaverlodge Arena
- Colours: Red, Black, Silver, White
- General manager: Levi George
- Head coach: Levi George
- Website: www.beaverlodgeblades.com/

Franchise history
- 1997–2018: Beaverlodge Junior Blades
- 2022-present: Beaverlodge Blades

The Beaverlodge Blades are a Junior "B" Ice Hockey team based in Beaverlodge, Alberta, Canada. They are members of the North West Junior Hockey League (NWJHL) and played their home games at Beaverlodge Arena. Beaverlodge is located west of Grande Prairie, Alberta. The team folded after the 2018 season. The Beaverlodge Blades were accepted back into the North West Junior Hockey League for the 2022-23 season.

== Season-by-season record ==
Note: GP = Games played, W = Wins, L = Losses, OTL = Overtime Losses, Pts = Points, GF = Goals for, GA = Goals against, PIM = Penalties in minutes

Season	GP	W	L	OTL	Pts	GF	GA	PIM	Finish	Playoffs
2008–09	35	13	20	2	28	177	208	—	6th, NWJHL	
2009–10	35	13	21	1	27	140	192	979	7th, NWJHL	Lost in Quarterfinals, 2-3 (Huskies)
2010–11	35	11	20	4	26	115	171	777	6th, NWJHL	Lost in Quarterfinals, 0-3 (Wheelers)
2011–12	36	5	29	2	12	101	280	—	6th, NWJHL	Lost in Quarterfinals, 0-3 (Wolverines)
2012–13	35	11	24	0	22	127	192	—	6th, NWJHL	Lost in Quarterfinals, 0-3 (Navigators)
2013–14	35	6	28	1	13	107	245	—	8th, NWJHL	Lost in Quarterfinals, 0-3 (Navigators)
2014–15	30	1	29	1	3	—	—	—	7 of 7, NWJHL	Forfeit Quarterfinals, 0-3 (Kings)
2015–16	36	4	32	0	8	74	309	—	7 of 7, NWJHL	Lost Quarterfinals, 0-3 (Navigators)
2016–17	20	1	19	0	2	37	168	326	Operations on hold midseason	
2017–18	36	3	32	0	1	7	107	258	7 of 7, NWJHL	Lost Quarterfinals, 0-3 (Navigators)

Season	GP	W	L	OTL	Pts	GF	GA	PIM	Finish	Playoffs
2022–23	42	11	24	7	29	111	167	x	7 of 8, NWJHL	Lost Quarterfinals, 0-3 (Kings)
2023–24	42	20	21	1	41	143	159	x	5 of 8, NWJHL	Won Quarterfinals, 3-0 (Kodiaks); Lost Semifinals, 1-4 (Lumber Barons)
2024–25	40	23	15	2	48	199	143	x	3 of 4, N/S Div; 4th of 8 NWJHL	Won Div Semis, 3-2 (Kodiaks); Lost Semifinals, 2-4 (Lumber Barons)
2025–26	40	22	17	1	45	196	193	x	3 of 4, N/S Div; 5th of 8 NWJHL	Lost Div Semis, 0-3 (Kings)
