= Cochrane Generals =

Cannex Cochrane Generals
- City: Cochrane, Alberta
- League: Heritage Junior B Hockey League
- Division: South
- Founded: 1984
- Home arena: SLS Centre
- Colours: Union Blue, Goal Red, Capital Silver, White
- President: Rick Richards
- General manager: Angela Sellwood
- Head coach: Derek Bell
- Asst. coaches: Trevor Devnich; Connor Stephenson
- Website: www.cochranegenerals.com

Franchise history
- 1984-Present: Cochrane Generals

The Cannex Cochrane Generals are a Junior "B" Ice Hockey team based in Cochrane, Alberta, Canada. They are members of the South Division of the Heritage Junior B Hockey League (HJHL). They play their home games at the Spray Lake Sawmills Centre.

== History ==
The Cochrane Generals Junior Hockey Club have been representing the Town Of Cochrane Since 1984. The team played in the FJHL and the CAJHL before our move to the HJHL winning 2 championships back to back 1985-1986. We played at the Original Cochrane Arena from 1984-2001/2018-2023 before our move to the SLS Centre. In our 41 year history we have won 6 Division titles and 4 league titles, Including 2 Silver medals at the Alberta Junior B Provincials.

== Season-by-season record ==
Note: GP = Games played, W = Wins, L = Losses, T = Ties, OTL = Overtime Losses, Pts = Points, GF = Goals for, GA = Goals against, PIM = Penalties in minutes

Season	GP	W	L	T	OTL	Pts	GF	GA	PIM	Finish	Playoffs
2004-05	37	22	15	0	0	44	232	174		4th, South	
2005-06	38	19	17	1	1	40	179	192	1018	3rd, South	Lost div semi-finals, 1-4 (Thunder)
2006-07	36	20	15	0	1	41	204	161	1154	3rd, Central	Lost div semi-finals, 2-3 (Colts)
2007-08	36	25	10	1	0	51	218	128	1104	3rd, South	HJHL Champions, 3-2 (Lightning)
2008-09	36	27	7	1	1	56	227	118	977	1st, South	HJHL Champions, 2-1 (Lightning)
2009-10	36	21	13	1	1	44	223	145	919	3rd, Central	Lost Div Finals, 0-4 (Thunder)
2010-11	36	30	5	1	0	61	245	127	972	1st, Central	Lost HJHL Semifinals, 2-3 (Wranglers)
2011-12	38	26	10	2	0	54	208	143	?	2nd, South	Lost Div Finals, ?-? (Bisons)
2012-13	38	15	18	4	1	35	182	181	?	5th, South	Lost div semi-finals, 0-4 (Bisons)
2013-14	36	15	18	x	3	33	139	152	?	6th, South	Did not qualify
2014-15	38	25	10	-	3	53	148	132	?	2nd, South	Lost div semi-finals, 0-4 (Bisons)
2015-16	38	29	5	x	4	62	198	112	?	1st, South	Won Division Semifinals, 4-0 (Wheatland Kings); Won Div Finals, 4-1 (Copperheads); Lost League Finals, 2-4 (Colts)
2016-17	38	33	4	x	1	67	236	98	?	1st of 7, South; 1 of 14, League	Won Div Semifinals, 4-0 (Bears); Won Division Finals, 4-2 (Copperheads); Lost League Finals, 1-3 (Vipers); Advance to Russ Barnes Trophy
2017-18	36	24	11	x	1	49	176	114	?	3rd of 7, South; 5 of 13, League	Won Div quarterfinals, 2-1 (Cubs); Lost div semi-finals, 0-3 (Bisons)
2018-19	38	27	9	x	2	56	186	117	?	3rd of 7, South; 5th of 15, League	Won Div Quarterfinals, 2-0 (Flyers); Won Division Semifinals, 4-1 (Bisons); Lost division finals, 1-4 (Copperheads)
2019-20	38	29	7	x	2	49	163	95	?	2nd of 7, South; 3rd of 14, League	Won Div Semifinals, 4-3 (Cubs); Incomplete Div Finals, 1-2 (Bisons) remaining playoffs cancelled due to covid
2020–21	3	3	0	–	0	6	18	4	–	Remaining season lost to COVID-19 pandemic	
2021-22	36	28	5	x	3	59	214	99	?	1st of 7, North; 2nd of 14, League	Won Div Semifinals, 4-3 (Rams); Won Div Finals, 4-1 (Vipers); Lost Div Finals, 0-3 (Bisons); Runner advances to Russ Barnes Championships
2022-23	38	23	12	x	3	49	184	132	?	3rd of 6, South; 4th of 12, League	Won Div Quarterfinals, 2-0 (Flyers); Lost Div Semifinals, 2-4 (Cubs)
2023-24	38	21	12	x	5	47	157	110	?	4th of 6, South; 5th of 13, League	Lost Div Play In, 1-2 (Flyers)
2024-25	38	20	17	x	1	41	121	134	?	4th of 6, South; 5th of 13, League	Won Play In, 2-1 (Copperheads); Lost Div Semifinals, 1-3 (Bisons)
2025-26	36	21	19	x	2	44	158	117	?	3rd of 6, South; 6th of 11, League	Won Div Semifinals, 3-1 (Wheatland Kings); Lost Div. Finals 0-3 (Cubs)

== Russ Barnes Trophy ==
Alberta Jr B Provincial Championships

Year	Round Robin	Record	Standing	Semifinal	Bronze Medal Game	Gold Medal Game
2008	W, Vermilion 6-4; L, Beaumont 3-5; W, Calgary Royals 7-2	2-1-0	2nd of 4 Pool	L, Three Hills 2-4	n/a	n/a
2009	W, Sherwood Park 6-4; W, Cold Lake 6-5; L, Calgary Royals 4-5	2-1-0	1st of 4 Pool	L, Lloydminster 1-5	n/a	n/a
2017	L, Beaumont 5-6; W, Fairview 3-2; W, Wainwright 4-3	2-1-0	2nd of 4 Pool	W, CBHA Rangers 8-3	n/a	L, Wainwright 4-5
2022	W, Fort St. John Huskies 5-4; W, St. Paul Canadiens 5-4; W, Beaumont Chiefs 4-3	3-0-0	1st of 4 Pool	W, Sherwood Park Knights 5-2	n/a	L, Fort St. John Huskies 0-6; Silver Medalists

== Awards and trophies ==
League champions

- 1984-85 1985-86 1988-89, 2007–08, 2008–09

Division champions

- 1984-85, 1985-86, 1988-89, 2007-2008, 2008-2009, 2015-2016, 2016-2017, 2021-2022

Provincial Medals

- 2016-2017, 2021-2022

== See also ==
- List of ice hockey teams in Alberta
