= Three Hills Thrashers =

Three Hills Titans
- City: Three Hills, Alberta
- League: United States Junior Hockey League; Premier Conference
- Division: Alberta
- Home arena: Three Hills Centennial Place
- Colours: Blue, green, white
- General manager: (Canada) Reid Fenton
- Head coach: (Canada) Bryce Pennock
- Website: www.threehillsthrashers

Franchise history
- 2000–2025: Three Hills Thrashers
- 2025–current: Three Hills Titans

The Three Hills Titans are a junior ice hockey team based in Three Hills, Alberta, Canada. They are members of the Alberta Division of the United States Premier Hockey League, Premier Conference. They play their home games at Three Hills Centennial Place.

== Season-by-season record ==
The Three Hills Thrashers were a junior B ice hockey team based in Three Hills, Alberta, Canada. They are members of the North Division of the Heritage Junior B Hockey League (HJHL). They play their home games at Three Hills Centennial Place.

The Thrashers took a one year leave of absence from the Heritage Junior Hockey League, for the 2019-2020 season.

In early 2020, a new group went to work to save the franchise, and successfully endeavored to return to active status for the 2020-2021 season.

In 2025, the Thrashers once again took a leave of absence for the 2025-2026 season. On August 1, 2025 the USPHL announced that Three Hills and four other Alberta towns were forming the Alberta Division for the 2025-26 USPHL Premier League.

== Season-by-season record ==
Note: GP = Games played, W = Wins, L = Losses, T = Ties, OTL = Overtime Losses, Pts = Points, GF = Goals for, GA = Goals against, PIM = Penalties in minutes

Season	GP	W	L	T	OTL	Pts	GF	GA	PIM	Finish	Playoffs
2004–05	40	22	15	2	1	47	199	162	—	4th, North	
2005–06	38	13	21	3	1	30	140	174	1335	6th, North	Did not qualify
2006–07	36	14	17	3	2	33	142	161	1357	4th, Central	Lost in Division Semifinals, 0–3 (Thunder)
2007–08	36	25	9	2	0	52	204	128	1244	2nd, North	Lost in Division Finals, 1–3 (Lightning)
2008–09	36	23	9	3	1	50	211	138	755	3rd, North	Lost in Division Finals, 1–3 (Lightning)
2009–10	36	22	11	1	2	47	166	133	952	2nd, Central	Lost in Division Semifinals, 0–3 (Generals)
2010–11	36	23	11	1	1	48	167	123	878	2nd, Central	Lost in Division Finals, 3–4 (Generals)
2011–12	38	23	12	2	1	49	150	119	869	2nd, North	Lost in Division Semifinals, 1–4 (Blackfalds)
2012–13	38	17	17	2	2	38	141	141	854	4th, North	Lost in Division Quarterfinals, 0–2 (Colts)
2013–14	36	16	17	—	3	35	150	154	—	5th, North	Won Division Qualifier, 2–1 (Vipers); Lost in Division Semifinals, 0–4 (Blackfalds)
2014–15	38	18	19	—	1	37	134	155	—	5th, North	Lost in Division Qualifier, 1–2 (Vipers)
2015–16	38	19	16	—	3	41	155	158	—	5th, North	Lost in Division Qualifier, 0–2 (Blackfalds)
2016–17	38	7	30	—	1	15	87	213	—	7th of 7, North	Did not qualify
2017–18	36	1	35	—	0	2	50	285	—	7th of 7, North	Did not qualify
2018–19	38	2	35	—	1	5	66	396	—	7th of 7, North; 14th of 14	Did not qualify
2019–20	Team inactive this season										
2020–21	4	1	3	–	0	2	11	17	–	Remaining season lost to COVID-19 pandemic	
2021–22	36	8	27	–	1	17	72	184	–	7th of 7, North; 11th of 14, League	Did not qualify
2022–23	38	11	25	–	2	24	128	218	–	6th of 6, North; 11th of 14, Lea.	Lost Qualifying Round, 0-2 (Colts)
2023–24	38	14	20	–	4	32	129	154	–	4th of 7, North; 10th of 13, Lea.	Lost Qualifying Round, 0-2 (Thunder)
2024–25	38	14	20	–	4	32	138	190	–	4th of 7, North; 10th of 13, Lea.	Lost Qualifying Round, 0-2 (Thunder)
Three Hills Titans
2025–26	31	18	11	2	0	138	114	38		3rd of 6, Alberta; 50 of 77, USPHL Premier	North Pod Round Robin 0-2; Lost Game 4-10 (Havoc); Lost Game 5-8 (Scouts); Lost Qualify Game 1-5 (Havoc)

== Russ Barnes Trophy ==
Alberta Jr. B Provincial Championships

Year	Round Robin	Record	Standing	SemiFinal	Bronze Medal Game	Gold Medal Game
2008	W, Sherwood Park Knights, 6–1; L, North Peace Navigators, 2–4; W, Lloydminster Bandits, 6–4	2–1–0	1st of 4, Pool	W, Cochrane Generals, 4–2	—	L, Sherwood Park Knights, 3–8; Silver Medal

== NHL alumni ==
- Kevin Haller

== See also ==
- List of ice hockey teams in Alberta
