= Dawson Creek Kodiaks (NWJHL) =

Junior ice hockey club

- City: Dawson Creek
- League: NWJHL
- Founded: 1994
- Home arena: Ovintiv Events Centre
- Colours: Crimson; Yellow
- General manager: Colby Wagar
- Head coach: Colby Wagar
- Website: dawsoncreekkodiaks.ca

Franchise history
- 1994–2021: Dawson Creek Jr. Canucks
- 2021–present: Dawson Creek Kodiaks

The Dawson Creek Kodiaks are a junior ice hockey club and franchise of the North West Junior Hockey League (NWJHL) based in Dawson Creek, British Columbia. The team plays its home games at the 5,000-seat Ovintiv Events Centre which opened in 2008. The club was founded in 1994 as the Dawson Creek Jr. Canucks and was rebranded in 2021.

Season-by-season record
Season	GP	W	L	OTL	Pts	GF	GA	PIM	Regular season	Playoffs
2008–09	35	20	13	2	42	153	120	—	4th overall	Data missing
2009–10	35	15	18	2	32	152	147	1326	5th overall	Won Quarterfinals, (Navigators); Lost Semifinals, 0–4 (Wolverines)
2010–11	35	15	19	1	31	132	148	1234	4th overall	Won Quarterfinals, (Huskies); Lost Semifinals, 0–4 (Wolverines)
2011–12	36	2	31	3	7	93	248	—	7th overall	Lost Quarterfinals, 0–3 (Kings)
2012–13	35	12	21	2	26	109	178	—	6th overall	Lost Quarterfinals, 1–3 (Flyers)
2013–14	35	14	19	2	30	116	149	—	6th overall	Lost Quarterfinals, 0–3 (Flyers)
2014–15	30	14	12	4	32	—	—	—	4 overall	Lost Quarterfinals, 0–3 (Huskies)
2015–16	36	7	26	3	17	93	169	—	6 overall	Lost Quarterfinals, 0–3 (Kings)
2016–17	30	16	13	1	33	133	127	—	4 overall	Lost Quarterfinals, 1–3 ()
2017–18	36	24	10	2	50	181	144	—	3rd overall	Won Quarterfinals, 3–0 (Vipers); Lost Semifinals, 3-4 (Navigators)
2018–19	36	23	13	0	46	150	124	—	2nd overall	Lost Semifinals, 3-4 (Kings)
2019–20	40	22	14	4	48	175	162	—	2nd overall	Won Quarterfinals, 3–1 (Vipers); Lost Semifinals, 1-4 (Navigators)
2020–21	3	0	13	0	0	5	17	—	Season cancelled	
2021–22	40	18	22	0	36	133	141	215	4th overall	Won quarterfinal against Fairview (3:2); Lost semifinal against Fort St. John (4:2)
2022–23	42	26	11	5	57	168	124	808	3rd overall	Won quarterfinal against La Crete (3:2); Lost semifinal against Fort St. John (4:0)
2023–24	42	18	19	5	41	175	164	845	4th overall	Lost quarterfinal against Beaverlodge (3:0)
2024–25	40	15	24	1	31	133	167	741	3rd in division 6th overall	Won quarterfinal against North Peace (3:1); Lost semifinal against Fort St. John (4:0)
2025–26	40	12	25	3	27	135	204	556	3rd in division 7th overall	Lost quarterfinal against North Peace (3:0)

Source: "NWJHL standings". North West Junior Hockey League.
