= North West Junior Hockey League =

Canadian sports league

North West Junior Hockey League (NWJHL)
- Sport: Ice Hockey
- Founded: 1994–95
- No. of teams: 8
- Country: Canada
- Continent: North America
- Most recent champion: La Crete Lumber Barons (2025-26)
- Most titles: Fort St. John Huskies (7)
- Website: nwjhl.com

The North West Junior Hockey League is a Junior "B" Ice Hockey league operating in the Peace River region of Alberta and British Columbia, Canada, sanctioned by Hockey Canada. The winner of Northwest "B" playoffs earns the chance to compete for the Western Canadian Junior "B" Crown, the Keystone Cup. To earn the right to compete, they must face off against the winners of the other Alberta "B" leagues in the Russ Barnes Trophy.

In May the league announced that the Hilton Timberwolves, former members of the Can-Am Junior Hockey League. Prior to the start of the new season, the Timberwolves announced they would not be active. It is likely they lost their home arena to the new Hilton Canadians, announced as a founding member of the Alberta Elite Junior Hockey League,

== Teams ==
Team	City	Arena	Founded	Joined	Head coach	Titles
Beaverlodge Blades	Beaverlodge, Alberta	Beaverlodge Arena	1997	2022	Phil Sykes	0
County of Grande Prairie Wheat Kings	Grande Prairie, Alberta	Crosslink County Sportsplex	1994		Lyndin Lewis	1
Dawson Creek Kodiaks	Dawson Creek, British Columbia	Dawson Creek Memorial Arena	1994		Colby Wagar	2
Fairview Flyers	Fairview, Alberta	Fairview Arena	2012		Dolan Bjornson	1
Fort St. John Huskies	Fort St. John, British Columbia	North Peace Arena	1966	1996	Todd Alexander	8
La Crete Lumber Barons	La Crete, Alberta	Raymond Knelsen Arena	2022		Dion Knelsen	1
North Peace Navigators	Peace River, Alberta	Baytex Energy Centre	2000		Jody Menssa	6
Sexsmith Vipers	Sexsmith, Alberta	Sexsmith Arena	1994		Kyle Weegar	1

=== Former teams ===
Team	City	Arena	Founded	Disbanded	Last head coach	Titles
Beaverlodge Blades	Beaverlodge, Alberta	Beaverlodge Arena	1997	2018	Phil Sykes	
Hinton Timberwolves	Hinton, Alberta	Dr. Duncan Murray Recreation Centre	2025	2025		
Moberley Lake Icemen	Chetwynd, British Columbia	Unknown	Unknown	Unknown	Unknown	0
Slave Lake Wolves	Slave Lake, Alberta	Arctic Ice Centre	1994	2014	Corey Paleck	3
Whitecourt Wolverines	Whitecourt, Alberta	Scott Safety Centre	2007	2012	Normand Lacombe	4

The Whitecourt Wolverines disbanded in the 2012 off-season to make way for the relocation of the St. Albert Steel of the Alberta Junior Hockey League, becoming the new Whitecourt Wolverines.

== Champions ==
Year	Winning team	Coach	Losing team	Coach	Games	Winning goal
1995	Slave Lake Wolves					
1996	Slave Lake Wolves					
1997	Slave Lake Wolves					
1998	Sexsmith Vipers					
1999	Dawson Creek Jr. Canucks					
2000	Fort St. John Huskies					
2001	Fort St. John Huskies					
2002	Dawson Creek Jr. Canucks					
2003	Fort St. John Huskies					
2004	North Peace Navigators					
2005	North Peace Navigators					
2006	Fort St. John Huskies					
2007	Fort St. John Huskies					
2008	North Peace Navigators					
2009	Whitecourt Wolverines	Joey Bouchard	Fort St. John Huskies	Bob Kalb	4-0	Wayne Quaife (1:17, third)
2010	Whitecourt Wolverines	Richard Kazda	Grande Prairie Wheelers	Jesse Reed	4–0	Kjell Reid (18:00, first)
2011	Whitecourt Wolverines	Shawn Gervais	North Peace Navigators	Darcy Haugan	4–2	Wayne Quaife (16:32, third)
2012	Whitecourt Wolverines	Normand Lacombe	North Peace Navigators	Darcy Haugan	4–0	Mitch Rose (9:45, first)
2013	Grande Prairie Kings	Kyle Chapple	North Peace Navigators	Darcy Haugan	4–2	Nolan Trudeau (5:32, second)
2014	North Peace Navigators	Darcy Haugan	Grande Prairie Kings	Kyle Chapple	4–2	Dylan Moore (3:42, overtime)
2015	North Peace Navigators	Darcy Haugan	Fairview Flyers	Lance Wiebe	4–0	Dylan Moore (2:02, first)
2016	North Peace Navigators	Craig Fox	Fairview Flyers	Lance Wiebe	4–1	Brendan Jay (1:11, second)
2017	Fairview Flyers	Lance Wiebe	North Peace Navigators	Sheldon Szmata	4–2	Ben Moffatt (19:49, third)
2018	Fort St. John Huskies	Gary Alexander	North Peace Navigators	Ken Quinney	4–2	Ben Moffatt (19:49, third)
2019	Fort St. John Huskies	Gary Alexander	Grande Prairie Kings	Kyle Chapple	4-2	
2020						
2021						
2022	Fort St. John Huskies	Gary Alexander	Grande Prairie Kings	Kyle Chapple	4-2	
2023	Fort St. John Huskies	Todd Alexander	Grande Prairie Kings	Trevor Morrow	4-2	
2024	La Crete Lumber Barons	Dion Knelsen	Fort St. John Huskies	Todd Alexander	4-1	Eric Giesbrecht (19:59, first)
2025	Fort St. John Huskies	Todd Alexander	La Crete Lumber Barons	Dion Knelsen	4-2	Jonny Timmons (14:59, third)
2026	La Crete Lumber Barons	Dion Knelsen	Fort St. John Huskies	Todd Alexander	4-0	Dwayne Wieler (2:25, second)

== NHL alumni ==
- Matt Walker

== See also ==
- List of ice hockey teams in Alberta
