= Sexsmith Vipers =

- City: Sexsmith, Alberta, Canada
- League: NWJHL
- Home arena: Sexsmith Arena
- Colours: Red, Black, White, Gold
- General manager: (Canada) Kelly Wilson & Kurt Marchesi (2017-18)
- Head coach: (Canada) Joel Sha (2017-18)
- Website: Sexsmithvipers.com

Franchise history
- ?-present: Sexsmith Vipers

The Sexsmith Vipers are a Junior "B" Ice Hockey team based in Sexsmith, Alberta, Canada. They are members of the North West Junior Hockey League (NWJHL). They play their home games at Sexsmith Arena.

== Season-by-season record ==
Note: GP = Games played, W = Wins, L = Losses, OTL = Overtime Losses, Pts = Points, GF = Goals for, GA = Goals against, PIM = Penalties in minutes

Season	GP	W	L	OTL	Pts	GF	GA	PIM	Finish	Playoffs
2008-09	35	3	32	0	6	104	254	1107	8th, NWJHL	
2009-10	35	11	15	9	31	117	178	1057	6th, NWJHL	Lost in Quarterfinals, 0-3 (Wheelers)
2010-11	35	10	23	2	22	101	180	1022	7th, NWJHL	Lost in Quarterfinals, 0-3 (Navigators)
2011-12	36	11	24	1	23	139	233	-	5th, NWJHL	Lost in Quarterfinals, 1-3 (Huskies)
2012-13	35	9	23	0	18	112	211	-	8th, NWJHL	Lost in Quarterfinals, 0-3 (Kings)
2013-14	35	7	25	2	16	114	262	-	7th, NWJHL	Lost in Quarterfinals, 0-3 (Flyers)
2014-15	30	6	23	1	13	-	-	-	6th of 7 NWJHL	Lost in Quarterfinals, 1-3 (Kings)
2015-16	36	14	19	3	31	144	155	-	5th of 7 NWJHL	Lost Quarterfinals, 0-3 (Huskies)
2016-17	30	5	23	2	12	87	146	-	6th of 6 NWJHL	Lost Quarterfinals, 0-3 (Huskies)
2017-18	36	9	25	2	20	115	177	-	6th of 7 NWJHL	Lost Quarterfinals, 0-3 (Jr. Canucks)
2018-19	36	11	22	3	25	107	158	-	6th of 6 NWJHL	Lost Quarterfinals, 2-3 (Kings)
2019-20	40	5	21	4	14	105	238	-	6th of 6 NWJHL	Lost Quarterfinals, 1-3 (Jr. Canucks)
2020–21	5	0	5	0	0	13	32	—	Season cancelled due to covid-19 pandemic	
2021-22	40	20	20	0	40	142	125	-	2nd of 6 NWJHL	Lost Semifinals, 1-3 (Kings)
2022-23	42	28	13	1	57	156	130	-	4th of 6 NWJHL	Won Quarterfinals, 3-1 (Navigators); Lost Semifinals, 0-4 (Kings)
2023-24	42	12	28	2	26	121	214	-	7th of 8 NWJHL	Won Play In, 2-0 (Flyers); Lost Quarterfinals, 0-3 (Barons)
2024-25	40	12	26	2	24	117	198	-	4th of 4 N/S Div; 7th of 8 NWJHL	Lost Div Semi, 0-3 (Barons)
2025-26	40	13	22	5	31	126	176	-	4th of 4 N/S Div; 6th of 8 NWJHL	Lost Div Semi, 0-3 (Barons)
