= Ponoka Stampeders =

- City: Ponoka, Alberta, Canada
- League: Heritage Junior Hockey League
- Division: North
- Founded: 1998–99
- Home arena: Ponoka Culture & Recreation Complex
- Colours: Red, Black, White
- Website: Stampeders website

Franchise history
- 1998-Present: Ponoka Stampeders

The Ponoka Stampeders were a Junior "B" Ice Hockey team based in Ponoka, Alberta, Canada. They were members of the North Division of the Heritage Junior Hockey League (HJHL). They play their home games at Ponoka Culture & Recreation Complex.

== History ==
In 1998 the Ponoka Stampeders came into existence in the Heritage Junior B Hockey League. The name nickname "Stampeders" was adopted from an Alberta Junior Hockey League that played in Ponoka for three seasons, from 1967-68 through 1969-70.

== Season-by-season record ==
Note: GP = Games played, W = Wins, L = Losses, T = Ties, OTL = Overtime Losses, Pts = Points, GF = Goals for, GA = Goals against, PIM = Penalties in minutes

Season	GP	W	L	T	OTL	Pts	GF	GA	PIM	Finish	Playoffs
2004-05	40	11	25	2	2	26	133	221		8th, North	
2005-06	38	14	20	3	1	32	145	184	1143	5th, North	Did not qualify
2006-07	36	4	30	0	2	10	107	225	1382	4th, North	Lost in Division Semifinals, 0-3 (Wranglers)
2007-08	36	9	24	1	2	21	128	247	1042	7th, North	Lost in Division Semifinals, 0-3 (Wranglers)
2008-09	35	3	32	0	0	6	120	385	923	8th, North	Lost in Division Semifinals, 0-2 (Wranglers)
2009-10	35	6	29	0	0	12	109	264	1115	5th, North	Did not qualify
2010-11	36	11	22	3	0	28	121	194	1136	4th, North	Lost in Division Semifinals, 0-3 (Wranglers)
2011-12	38	4	34	0	0	8	65	235	-	7th, North	Did not qualify
2012-13	38	1	36	1	0	4	96	323	-	7th, North	Did not qualify
2013-14	36	0	33	-	3	3	79	241	-	7th, North	Did not qualify
2014-15	38	2	30	-	6	10	98	228	-	7th, North	Did not qualify
2015-16	38	11	25	-	2	24	122	217	-	6th, North	Lost in Division Qualifier, 0-2 (Vipers)
2016-17	38	8	26	-	4	20	122	251	-	6th of 7, North; 12 of 14, League	Lost in Division Qualifier, 0-2 (Vipers)
2017-18	38	11	22	-	3	25	133	189	-	6th of 7, North; 10 of 13, League	Lost Division Qualifier, 0-2 (Wranglers)
2018-19	38	10	26	-	2	22	109	212	-	6th of 7, North; 12 of 14, League	Lost Div. Quarterfinal, 0-2 (Colts)
2019-20	38	9	27	-	2	20	110	208	-	7th of 7, North; 13 of 14, League	Did not qualify
2020-21	4	0	4	-	0	0	11	25	-	Remaining season lost to COVID-19 pandemic	
2021-22	Franchise inactive this season										
2022-23	Franchise inactive this season										
2023-24	38	1	36	-	1	3	61	371	-	7th of 7, North; 13 of 13, League	Did not qualify
2024-25	38	1	37	-	-	2	72	263	-	7th of 7, North; 13 of 13, League	Did not qualify
2025-26	36	1	35	-	-	2	58	295	-	6th of 6, North; 12 of 12, League	Did not qualify

== NHL alumni ==
- Jim McCrimmon
- Stan Weir
- Randy Wyrozub

== See also ==
- List of ice hockey teams in Alberta
