= Coaldale Copperheads =

- City: Coaldale, Alberta
- League: Heritage Junior B Hockey League
- Division: South
- Founded: 2007–08
- Home arena: Coaldale Arena
- Colours: Black, Metallic Gold, Orange, White
- General manager: (Canada) Doug Paisley
- Head coach: (Canada) Doug Paisley
- Website: www.coaldalecopperheads.com/

Franchise history
- 2007-Present: Coaldale Copperheads

The Coaldale Copperheads are a Junior "B" Ice Hockey team based in Coaldale, Alberta, Canada. They are members of the South Division of the Heritage Junior B Hockey League (HJHL). They play their home games at Coaldale Arena.

The 2014-15 season saw the Copperheads win their first HJHL championship and went on to Hockey Alberta Provincials. The Copperheads would once again represent the HJHL at provincials in 2017-18 as south division champions after losing the 2018 league final to the Red Deer Vipers. The Copperheads have never qualified for the medal round at provincials.

== Season-by-season record ==
Note: GP = Games played, W = Wins, L = Losses, T = Ties, OTL = Overtime Losses, Pts = Points, GF = Goals for, GA = Goals against, PIM = Penalties in minutes

Season	GP	W	L	T	OTL	Pts	GF	GA	PIM	Finish	Playoffs
2007-08	36	15	17	3	1	34	127	136	964	5th, South	Lost in Division Semifinals, 1-3 (Bisons)
2008-09	36	19	15	2	0	40	147	142	1016	4th, South	Lost in Division Semifinals, 0-2 (Cubs)
2009-10	36	19	14	1	2	41	157	156	1405	3rd, South	Lost in Division Semifinals, 1-3 (Cubs)
2010-11	36	21	11	3	1	46	182	127	1322	2nd, South	Lost in Division Finals, 1-4 (Bisons)
2011-12	38	18	17	0	3	39	159	165	-	4th, South	Lost in Division Semifinals, ?-? (Bisons)
2012-13	38	24	11	2	1	51	175	136	-	2nd, South	Lost in Division Semifinals, 1-4 (Cubs)
2013-14	36	16	16	x	4	36	153	143	-	5th, South	Lost in Division Semifinals, 0-4, (Bisons)
2014-15	38	31	6	-	1	62	215	111	-	1st, South	Won Division Semifinals, 4-3 (Wheatland Kings); Won Division Finals, 4-0 (Bisons); Won League Finals, 3-0 (Wranglers) advance to BARNES TROPHY
2015-16	38	26	10	-	2	54	213	144	-	3rd, South	Won Elimination Round, 0-2 (Flyers); Won Division Semis, 4-2 (Bisons); Lost Division Finals, 1-4 (Generals)
2016-17	38	24	12	-	2	50	216	127	-	3rd of 7, South; 7 of 14, League	Won Elimination Round, 0-2 (Cubs); Won Division Semis, 4-3 (Bisons); Lost Division Finals, 2-4 (Generals)
2017-18	36	24	10	-	2	50	154	113	-	1st of 7, South; 2 of 13, League	Won Div. Semifinal, 3-2 (Flyers); Won Div. Finals 4-1 (Bisons); Lost League Finals 1-2 (Vipers); Advance to Russ Barnes as Runner Up
2018-19	38	24	12	-	2	50	199	100	-	1st of 7, South, South; 2nd of 15, League	Won Division Semis, 4-3 (Cubs); Won Division Finals, 4-1 (Generals); Lost League Finals, 3-0 (Thunder); Advance to Russ Barnes as Runner Up
2019-20	38	24	13	-	1	49	188	136	-	4th of 7, South; 5th of 14, League	Lost Div. Semifinal, 2-3 (Flyers)
2020–21	2	1	0	–	1	3	9	7	–	Remaining season lost to COVID-19 pandemic	
2021-22	36	22	11	-	3	47	196	102	-	2nd of 7, South; 7th of 14, League	Won Division Quarters, 4-3 (Junior Braves); Lost Division Semifinals, 0-4 (Cubs)
2022-23	38	13	20	-	5	31	139	169	-	5th of 6, South; 9th of 16, League	Lost Division Quarters, 1-2 (Wheatland Kings)
2023-24	38	24	12	-	2	50	167	139	-	3rd of 6, South; 4th of 13, League	Lost Quarterfinals, 0-3 (Cubs)
2024-25	38	14	21	-	3	31	128	159	-	5th of 6, South; 8th of 13, League	Lost Playin, 0-2 (Generals)
2025-26	36	19	15	-	2	41	161	138	-	4th of 6, South; 7th of 11, League	Lost Playin, 0-2 (Bisons)

== Russ Barnes Trophy ==
Alberta Jr B Provincial Championships

Year	Round Robin	Record	Standing	SemiFinal	Bronze Medal Game	Gold Medal Game
2015	L, N Edmonton Red Wings 2-5; T, Fairview Flyers 2-2; W, Calgary Royals 6-5	1-1-1	3rd of 4 Pool	did not qualify	n/a	n/a
2018	W, Fort St. John Huskies 5-0; L, Wetaskiwin Icemen 7-8; T, Wainwright Bisons 1-1	1-1-1	3rd of 4 Pool B	did not qualify	n/a	n/a
2019	W, Wetaskiwin Icemen 7-5; L, Fort St. John Huskies 2-4; L, Wainwright Bisons 3-5	1-2-0	3rd of 4 Pool B	did not qualify	n/a	n/a

== See also ==
- List of ice hockey teams in Alberta
