= Heritage Junior Hockey League =

Junior ice hockey league in Alberta, Canada

Heritage Junior B Hockey League
- Upcoming season or competition: 2024–25 HJHL season
- Sport: Ice hockey
- Founded: 1986 (40 years ago)
- Divisions: 2
- No. of teams: 13
- Country: Canada
- Headquarters: Alberta, Canada
- Most recent champions: Medicine Hat Cubs (1st title)
- Most titles: Okotoks Bisons (8 titles)
- Website: heritagejunior.com

The Heritage Junior Hockey League (HJHL), formally the Heritage Junior B Hockey League, is a Junior B ice hockey league in Alberta, Canada, sanctioned by Hockey Canada. The HJHL was founded in 1986 and is made up of teams from southern and central Alberta. The HJHL is the 2nd largest Junior B league in the province, next to the CapJHL (14 teams), with 12 teams. The top two teams qualify for the Alberta Provincial Junior B Hockey Championship, whose winner had an option to compete in the Keystone Cup.

== History ==
HJHL teams have won the gold medal at the Keystone Cup twice. Red Deer Vipers were the first in 2006 defeating Campbell River Storm in the final. Blackfalds Wranglers won the gold medal in 2011.

The Lacombe Wranglers won the 2007 league championship over the Airdrie Thunder and Okotoks Bisons in a three team, round robin final. The Wranglers also captured the Alberta provincial title. The Wranglers chose not to participate in the Keystone Cup tournament due to scheduling conflicts.

During the 2011 HJHL finals Okotoks Bisons won the best-of-three series versus Blackfalds Wrangers 2–1, their eighth league title. Both teams advanced to the Junior B Provincials in Leduc. Blackfalds won the final 2–1 over the Beaumont Chiefs (CapJHL) to advance to the 2011 Keystone Cup in Sherwood Park. With a 4–1 record going into the final, Blackfalds defeated the host Sherwood Park Knights (CapJHL) 2–1 to win the Western Canadian crown.

== Teams ==
The league has 13 teams beginning in the 2026-27 season, including seven in the Northern division and six in the Southern division.

Don Lunn North Division
Team	Centre
Airdrie Thunder	Ron Ebbesen Twin Arena
Mountainview Colts	Didsbury Memorial Complex
Red Deer Vipers	Servus Arena
Rimbey Royals	Vern Poffenroth Memorial Arena
Rocky Rams	Rocky Arena Complex
Sylvan Lake Wranglers	Nexsource Centre

Gary Wournell South Division
Team	Centre
Coaldale Copperheads	Coaldale Sportsplex
Cochrane Generals	SLS Centre
High River Flyers	Bob Snodgrass Arena
Medicine Hat Cubs	Kinplex Arena
Okotoks Bisons	Murray Arena
Strathmore Wheatland Kings	Strathmore Family Centre Arena

=== Former teams ===
- Indus Hurricanes (1999–2021)
- Banff Academy Bears (2005–2017)
- Barrhead Jr. Elks
- Blackfalds Wranglers
- Claresholm Storm
- Drayton Valley Devils
- Hobbema Knight Hawks
- Kainai Junior Braves
- Innisfail Blades
- Lacombe Wranglers
- Livingstone Rockmen
- Lomond Lakers
- Maskwacis Attack
- Ponoka Stampeders
- Rimbey Rock
- Rimbey West Stars
- Siksika Ice
- Southern Express
- Stettler Lightning
- Three Hills Thrashers (2000-2025)

== Champions ==
HJHL champions
Season	Winner	Runner-up	Result
1987	Drayton Valley Devils		
1988	Barrhead Jr. Elks		
1989	Red Deer Cowboys		
1990	Terraco Knights		
1991	Hobbema Knight Hawks		
1992	Ponoka Knight Hawks		
1993	Lacombe Wranglers		
1994	Lacombe Wranglers		
1995	Lacombe Wranglers		
1996	Foothills Bisons		
1997	Foothills Bisons		
1998	Airdrie Thunder		
1999	Red Deer Vipers		
2000	Airdrie Thunder		
2001	Foothills Bisons		
2002	Foothills Bisons		
2003	Foothills Bisons		
2004	**Red Deer Vipers**		
2005	Okotoks Bisons		
2006	Okotoks Bisons	Red Deer Vipers	
2007	**Lacombe Wranglers**		
2008	Cochrane Generals		
2009	Cochrane Generals		
2010	Blackfalds Wranglers		
2011	Okotoks Bisons	Blackfalds Wranglers	
2012	Okotoks Bisons		
2013	**Okotoks Bisons**	Red Deer Vipers	3-0
2014	Okotoks Bisons	Blackfalds Wranglers	3-2
2015	Coaldale Copperheads	Blackfalds Wranglers	3-0
2016	Mountainview Colts	Cochrane Generals	4-2
2017	Red Deer Vipers	Cochrane Generals	3-1
2018	Red Deer Vipers	Coaldale Copperheads	2-1
2019	**Airdrie Thunder**	Coaldale Copperheads	3-0
2020	Cancelled (Covid-19)	---	---
2021	Cancelled (Covid-19)		
2022	Okotoks Bisons	Cochrane Generals	3-0
2023	Okotoks Bisons	Sylvan Lake Wranglers	3-0
2024	**Okotoks Bisons**	Sylvan Lake Wranglers	4-2
2025	Sylvan Lake Wranglers	Okotoks Bisons	3-1
2026	Medicine Hat Cubs	Red Deer Vipers	3-0

Bold text denotes teams that won the Alberta provincial title.

== See also ==
- List of ice hockey teams in Alberta
