= Mountainview Colts =

- City: Didsbury, Alberta, Canada
- League: Heritage Junior Hockey League
- Division: North
- Home arena: Didsbury Memorial Complex
- Colours: Blue, red, white
- General manager: (Canada) Gord Olsen
- Head coach: (Canada) Gord Olsen
- Website: www.mountainviewcolts.ca

Franchise history
- 19xx–present: Mountainview Colts

The Mountainview Colts are a junior "B" ice hockey team based in Didsbury, Alberta, Canada. They are members of the North Division of the Heritage Junior Hockey League (HJHL). They play their home games at Didsbury Memorial Complex. The Colts celebrated their 25th anniversary season during the 2014-15 season. The team won the Heritage Junior B Hockey League Championship after the 2015–16 season.

== Season-by-season record ==
Note: GP = Games played, W = Wins, L = Losses, T = Ties, OTL = Overtime Losses, Pts = Points, GF = Goals for, GA = Goals against, PIM = Penalties in minutes

Season	GP	W	L	T	OTL	Pts	GF	GA	PIM	Finish	Playoffs
2004–05	40	15	24	1	0	31	172	228	—	7th Nor.	
2005–06	38	23	14	0	1	47	194	161	1346	2nd Nor.	Lost in Division Semifinals, 1–4 (Wranglers)
2006–07	36	24	9	2	1	51	176	114	1378	2nd Cent.	Lost in Division Finals, 3–4 (Thunder)
2007–08	36	16	14	4	2	38	162	149	1310	5th Nor.	Lost in Division Semifinals, 2–3 (Thrashers)
2008–09	35	16	16	3	0	35	133	171	1456	5th Nor.	Lost in Division Semifinals, 1–2 (Vipers)
2009–10	35	11	19	4	1	27	106	124	935	4th Cent.	Lost in Division Semifinals, 2–3 (Thunder)
2010–11	36	12	20	3	1	28	112	164	969	4th Cent,	Lost in Division Semifinals, 2–3 (Generals)
2011–12	38	19	16	2	1	41	164	145	—	5th Nor.	Lost Division Finals (Thrashers)
2012–13	38	15	20	2	1	33	157	193	—	4th Nor.	Lost Division Semifinals, 0–4 (Wranglers)
2013–14	36	21	12	—	3	45	158	137	—	3rd Nor.	Lost Division Semifinals, 1–4 (Lightning)
2014–15	38	22	13	—	3	47	182	163	—	3rd Nor.	Won Division Qualifier, 2–1 (Lightning); Won Division Semi-final, 4–2 (Thunder); Lost Division Finals, 0–4 (Wranglers)
2015–16	38	27	10	—	1	55	193	121	—	1st Nor.	Won Division Semifinals, 4–0 (Wranglers); Won Division Finals, 4–0 (Thunder); Won League Finals, 4–2 (Generals)
2016–17	38	29	6	—	3	61	246	133	—	1st of 7Nor. 2nd of 14, HJHL	Won Division Semifinals, 4–1 (Wranglers); Lost Division Finals, 3–4 (Vipers)
2017–18	38	16	16	—	4	36	150	154	—	4th of 7 Nor. 8th of 14, HJHL	Won Division Quarterfinals, 2–1 (Lightning); Lost Division Semifinals, 1-3 (Vipers)
2018–19	38	22	14	—	2	46	160	131	—	3rd of 7 Nor. 6th of 14, HJHL	Won Division Quarterfinals, 2–0 (Stampeders); Won Division Semifinals, 4-3 (Vipers); Lost Division Finals, 2–4 (Thunder)
2019–20	38	19	16	—	3	41	154	140	—	4th of 7 Nor. 8th of 14, HJHL	Won Div Quarterfinals, 3-0 (Lightning); Won Division Semifinals, 4-2 (Thunder); Incomplete Div. Finals 1-2 (Wranglers) remaining playoffs cancelled - covid-19
2020–21	4	1	2	—	1	3	12	15	—	Remaining season lost to COVID-19 pandemic	
2021–22	36	23	11	—	2	48	162	119	—	4th of 7 Nor. 6th of 14, HJHL	Lost Div Quarterfinals, 0-2 (Thunder)
2022–23	38	21	15	—	2	44	152	140	—	3rd of 6 Nor. 6th of 12, HJHL	Won Div Quarterfinals, 2-0 (Thrashers); Lost Div Semifinals, 2-4 (Thunder)
2023–24	38	17	15	—	6	40	159	147	—	2nd of 7 Nor. 7th of 13, HJHL	Lost Div Quarterfinals, 0-2 (Rams)-
2024–25	38	19	17	—	2	40	137	136	—	3rd of 7 Nor. 7th of 13, HJHL	Lost Div Semifinals, 1-3 (Vipers)-
2025–26	36	27	9	—	-	54	161	110	—	2nd of 6 Nor. 2nd of 12, HJHL	Lost Div Semifinals, 2-3 (Wranglers)

== Russ Barnes Trophy ==
Alberta Jr. B Provincial Championships

Year	Round Robin	Record	Standing	SemiFinal	Bronze Medal Game	Gold Medal Game
2016	L, Wetaskiwin Icemen, 5–8; L, Wainwright Bisons, 1–2; L, CRAA Gold, 5–7	0–3–0	4th of 4, Pool	—	—	—

== See also ==
- List of ice hockey teams in Alberta
