= Fairview Flyers =

- City: Fairview, Alberta, Canada
- League: North West Junior Hockey League
- Founded: 2012
- Home arena: Fairview Fairplex
- Colours: Orange, Black, White
- General manager: Willem Louw
- Head coach: Dolan Bjornson
- Website: http://fairviewflyers.com/

Franchise history
- 2012–present: Fairview Flyers

The Fairview Flyers are a junior "B" ice hockey team based in Fairview, Alberta, Canada. The team is a member of the North West Junior Hockey League and the 2012–13 season was their inaugural season.

== History ==
The team was founded as the Fairview Junior Hockey Club in June 2012. The expansion team was officially named the Fariview Flyers in July.

In only their third year the Fairview Flyers advanced to the league finals. Although the Flyers lost the championships (they played the North Peace Navigators), circumstances (Note: because Stony Plain was host the second team normally given the Capital league assigned to Fairview) resulted in the team advancing to the Russ Barnes Trophy to determine the Alberta Junior B Provincial Champion.

== Inaugural season ==
The Fairview Flyers began their inaugural season on the road against the North Peace Navigators on September 28, 2012. Their home opener was held on October 5 against the Sexsmith Vipers.

== Season-by-season record ==
Note: GP = Games played, W = Wins, L = Losses, OTL = Overtime Losses, Pts = Points, GF = Goals for, GA = Goals against

Season	GP	W	L	OTL	Pts	GF	GA	Finish	Playoffs
2012–13	35	16	15	4	36	151	152	3rd of 8	Won Quarterfinals, 3-1 (Jr. Canucks); Lost Semifinals, 1-4 (Navigators)
2013–14	35	24	11	0	48	179	129	4th of 8	Won Quarterfinals, 3-0 (Jr. Canucks); Lost Semifinals, 1-4 (Kings)
2014–15	30	20	8	2	42	-	-	3rd of 7	Won Quarterfinals, 3-0 (Vipers); Won Semifinals, 4-2 (Kings); Lost League Finals, 0-4 (Navigators)
2015–16	36	30	4	2	62	211	83	1st of 7	Won Semifinals, 4-2 (Huskies); Lost League Finals, 1-4 (Navigators)
2016–17	30	21	9	0	42	120	83	1st of 6	Won Semifinals, 4-3 (Kings); Won League Finals 4-1 (Navigators); NWJHL CHAMPIONS
2017–18	36	17	17	2	36	146	158	5th of 7	Lost Quarterfinals, 2-3 (Kings)
2018–19	36	14	19	3	31	121	146	5th of 6	Lost Quarterfinals, 2-3 (Navigators)
2019–20	40	21	15	4	46	159	148	4th of 6	Won Quarterfinals, 3-2 (Kings); Lost Semifinals, 1-4 (Huskies)
2020-21	4	3	1	0	6	13	14	Season cancelled due to COVID-19 pandemic	
2021-22	40	14	26	0	28	138	179	5th of 6	Lost Quarterfinals, 2-3 (Kodiaks)
2022-23	42	3	35	4	10	98	279	8th of 8	Did not qualify for post season play
2023-24	42	3	38	1	7	86	324	8th of 8	Lost Playin, 0-2 (Vipers)
2024-25	40	3	35	2	8	78	279	4th of 4 Div; 8th of 8 League	Lost Div Semi, 0-3 (Huskies)
2025-26	40	5	33	2	12	120	266	4th of 4 Div; 8th of 8 League	Lost Div Semi, 2-3 (Huskies)

== Russ Barnes Trophy ==
Alberta Jr. B Provincial Championships

Year	Round Robin	Record	Standing	Semifinal	Bronze medal game	Gold medal game
2015	L, Calgary Jr. Royals, 3–5; T, Coaldale Copperheads, 2–2; W, North Edmonton Red Wings, 8–5	1–1–1	2nd of 4, Pool	L, North Peace Navigators, 0–7	W, Blackfalds Wranglers, 4–3; Bronze medalists	—
2017	L, Wainwright Bisons, 3–7; L, Cochrane Generals, 2–3; W, Beaumont Chiefs, 8–3	1–2–0	3rd of 4, Pool	Did not advance		

== See also ==
- List of ice hockey teams in Alberta
