= North Peace Navigators =

- City: Peace River, Alberta, Canada
- League: NWJHL
- Founded: 2000–01
- Home arena: Baytex Energy Centre
- Colours: Green, gold, white
- General manager: Jody Menssa
- Head coach: Jody Menssa
- Website: www.navshockey.com/

Franchise history
- 2000–2007: Peace Air Navigators
- 2007–present: North Peace Navigators

The North Peace Navigators are a junior "B" ice hockey team based in Peace River, Alberta, Canada. They are members of the North West Junior Hockey League (NWJHL). They play their home games at Baytex Energy Centre.

The Navigators have won seven regular season titles - six playoff titles and one Russ Barnes Trophy (Alberta provincial Jr. B Champions) since 2003. They have also won a silver medal and had 2 bronze medal finishes at the Provincials.

== Season-by-season record ==
Note: GP = Games played, W = Wins, L = Losses, OTL = Overtime Losses, Pts = Points, GF = Goals for, GA = Goals against, PIM = Penalties in minutes

Season	GP	W	L	OTL	Pts	GF	GA	PIM	Finish	Playoffs
2003–04	42	36	4	2	74	—	—	—	1st, NWJHL	NWJHL Champions, 4–2 (Huskies)
2004–05	35	26	8	1	53	—	—	—	1st, NWJHL	NWJHL Champions, 4–2 (Huskies)
2005–06	36	28	6	2	58	—	—	—	1st, NWJHL	Lost in Finals, 2–4 (Huskies)
2006–07	36	24	12	0	48	—	—	—	—	Lost in Finals, 3–4 (Huskies)
2007–08	34	28	4	2	58	—	—	—	1st, NWJHL	NWJHL Champions, 4–3 (Wolverines)
2008–09	35	21	13	1	43	154	131	1139	3rd, NWJHL	Lost in Semifinals, 3–4 (Huskies)
2009–10	35	15	16	4	34	115	138	776	4th, NWJHL	Lost in Quarterfinals, 1–3 (Jr. Canucks)
2010–11	35	29	5	1	59	185	75	765	2nd, NWJHL	Lost Finals, 0–4 (Wolverines)
2011–12	36	33	3	0	66	247	75	—	1st, NWJHL	Lost Finals, 2–4 (Wolverines)
2012–13	35	29	5	1	59	206	92	—	2nd, NWJHL	Lost Finals, 2–4 (Kings)
2013–14	35	31	4	0	62	247	75	—	1st, NWJHL	NWJHL Champions, 4–1 (Kings)
2014–15	30	26	3	1	53	—	—	—	1st of 7, NWJHL	Quarterfinals—bye; Won Semifinals, 4–0 (Huskies); Won League Finals, 4–0 (Flyers); NWJHL CHAMPIONS
2015–16	36	30	6	0	60	219	96	—	2nd of 7, NWJHL	Won Quarterfinals, 3–0 (Blades); Won Semifinals, 4–1 (Kings); Won League Finals, 4–1 (Flyers); NWJHL CHAMPIONS
2016–17	30	18	11	1	37	106	104	—	2nd of 6, NWJHL	Won Semifinals, 4–3 (Huskies); Lost League Finals, 1–4 (Flyers)
2017–18	36	25	8	3	53	162	102	—	2nd of 7, NWJHL	Won Quarterfinals, 3–0 (Blades); Won Semifinals, 4–3 (Jr. Canucks); Lost League Finals, 1–4 (Huskies); Advance to Alberta Provincials
2018–19	36	18	16	2	38	127	124	—	4th of 6, NWJHL	Won Quarterfinals, 3–2 (Flyers); Lost Semifinals, 3–4 (Huskies)
2019–20	40	25	13	2	52	157	122	—	2nd of 6, NWJHL	Won Semifinals, 4-1 (Jr. Canucks); Incomplete finals 0-0 (Huskies); Cancelled due to covid-19
2020–21	4	1	1	2	4	13	14	—	Season cancelled due to covid-19 pandemic	
2021–22	40	11	29	0	22	121	200	—	6th of 6, NWJHL	Lost Quarterfinals, 0-3 (Kodiaks)
2022-23	42	13	24	5	31	135	195	-	6th of 8, NWJHL	Lost Quarterfinals, 1-3 (Vipers)
2023–24	42	17	20	5	39	159	182	—	6th of 8, NWJHL	Won Quarterfinals, 3-0 (Kings); Lost Semifinals, 2-4 (Huskies) to Provincials as HOSTS
2024–25	40	15	22	3	33	160	194	—	2nd of 4 Div; 5th of 8, NWJHL	Lost Div Semis, 1-3 (Kodiaks)
2025–26	40	21	16	3	45	188	182	—	2nd of 4 Div; 5th of 8, NWJHL	Won Div Semis, 3-0 (Kodiaks); Lost Div Semis, 1-4 (Huskies)

== Russ Barnes Trophy ==
Alberta Jr. B Provincial Championships

Year	Round Robin	Record	Standing	SemiFinal	Bronze Medal Game	Gold Medal Game
2004	W, Lloydminster Bandits, 5–2; T, Okotoks Bisons, 6–6; W, Beverly Warriors, 9–2	2–0–1	1st of 4, Pool	L, Calgary Stampeders	L, Okotoks Bisons, 3–6	—
2005	W, Okotoks Bisons, 4–2; W, Beverly Warriors, 6–2; W, Calgary Bruins, 6–1	3–0–0	1st of 4, Pool	L, Vegreville Rangers, 3–6	W, Okotoks Bisons, 3–1; Bronze Medal	—
2008	L, Lloydminster Bandits, 3–6; W, Three Hills Thrashers, 4–2; L, Sherwood Park Knights, 1–2	1–2–0	4th of 4, Pool	did not advance		
2014	W, Royals Gold, 8–7; L, St. Albert Merchants, 3–6; T, Okotoks Bisons, 3–4	1–1–1	1st of 4, Pool A	L, Grande Prairie Kings, 2–6	W, St. Albert Merchants, 3–1; Bronze Medal	—
2015	W, Cold Lake Ice, 9–3; W, Blackfalds Wranglers, 5–0; W, Stony Plain Flyers, 4–1	3–0–0	1st of 4, Pool	W, Fairview Flyers, 7–0	—	L, North Edmonton Red Wings, 1–3; Silver Medal
2016	W, Red Deer Vipers, 3–0; T, Killam Wheat Kings, 4–4; T, North Edmonton Red Wings, 5–5	1–0–2	1st of 4, Pool	W, Wetaskiwin Icemen, 2–0	—	W, Wainwright Bisons, 3–2; Gold Medal
2018	L, Beverly Warriors, 2–5; L, Red Deer Vipers, 4–5; W, Calgary Royals Gold, 9–5	1–2–0	3rd of 4, Pool A	did not advance		
2024; HOST	L, La Crete Lumber Barons, 2-6; W, NWCAA Stampeders, 6-2; L, Okotoks Bisons, 3-5; L, St. Albert Merchants 5-9	1-3–0	5th of 6	did not advance		

== Keystone Cup history ==
Western Canadian Jr. B Championship (Northern Ontario to British Columbia)
Six teams in round robin play. 1st vs. 2nd for gold/silver; 3rd vs. 4th for bronze.

Year	Round Robin	Record	Standing	Bronze Medal Game	Gold Medal Game
2016	W, Peguis Juniors, 7–3; L, Saskatoon Quakers, 4–7; W, Thunder Bay Northern Hawks, 4–2; L, 100 Mile House Wranglers, 4–2; L, Regina Capitals, 5–3	2–3–0	4th of 6	OTW, Regina Capitals, 5–4	Did not qualify
