= Medicine Hat Cubs =

Canadian ice hockey club

- City: Medicine Hat, Alberta, Canada
- League: Heritage Junior B Hockey League
- Division: South
- Founded: 1973
- Home arena: Kinplex
- Colours: Orange, black, white
- General manager: Randy Wong
- Head coach: Trent Derzaph
- Website: medicinehatcubs.ca

Franchise history
- 1973–present: Medicine Hat Cubs

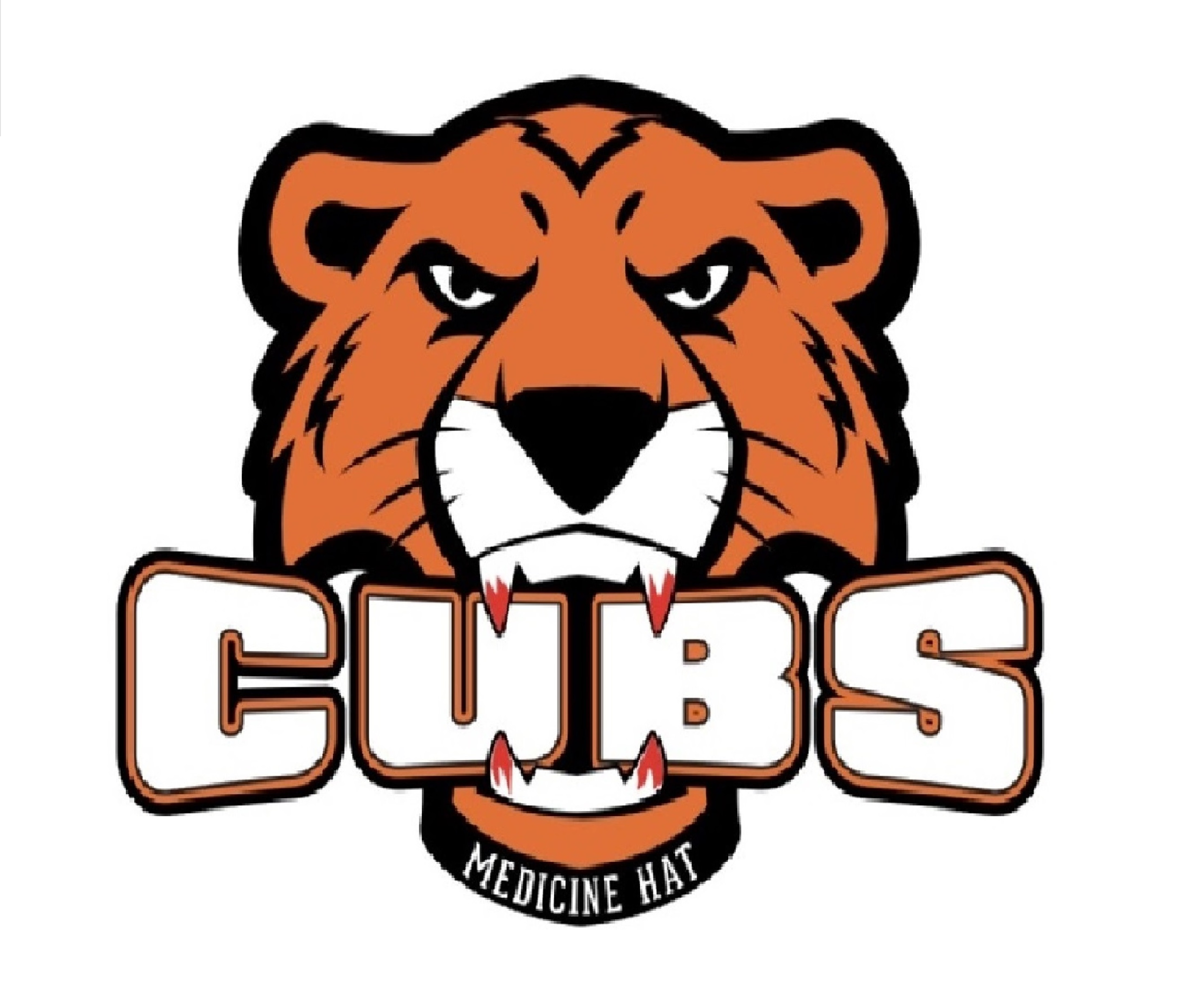
Cubs logo

The Medicine Hat Cubs are a Canadian Junior B ice hockey team located in Medicine Hat, Alberta. They play in the Heritage Junior B Hockey League, from the Medicine Hat Kinplex.

== History ==
The Cubs were founded in 1973 into the Heritage Junior B Hockey League. In their fifth year, 1977–78, they won the league championship for the first time, repeating as champions the next season. In the 1980s and 90s the Cubs won the league championship again in 1980–81, 85–86, 87–88, 90–91, 91–92, 92–93, 94–95, 95–96, 99–00 and 00–01. In this time two Cubs players went on to play in the National Hockey League (Blaine Lacher and Murray Craven) Since the 2001 season the Cubs have more or less struggled compared to former seasons, including some highly rough recent years. The Cubs took a mid-season leave of absence in January 2016 after deciding not to finish out the 2015–16 season with too few players. The Cubs were set to host the 2020 ATB FINANCIAL JUNIOR B PROVINCIALS April 2–5, 2020 but due to the COVID-19 outbreak, Provincials were cancelled.

The 2025-26 season was a break out season since 2001. The Cubs won the South Division League Championship. Won their 13th League Playoff Championship and advanced to Province of Alberta Junior "B" championships and finished as the runner up.

== Recent season-by-season record ==
As of the end of the 2022–23 season.

Season	GP	W	L	OTL	T	Pts	Finish	Playoffs
2002–03	36	25	7	3	1	54	3rd, South	N/A
2003–04	35	21	10	3	1	46	2nd, South	N/A
2004–05	38	26	11	0	1	53	3rd, South	Bronze Medal Keystone Cup
2005–06	38	17	17	3	1	38	4th, South	Lost Division Final 0-4 (Bisons)
2006–07	36	23	7	5	1	52	2nd, South	Lost Division Final 0-4 (Bisons)
2007–08	36	26	8	0	2	54	2nd, South	Lost Division Semifinal 2-3 (Generals)
2008–09	36	16	15	4	1	37	5th, South	Lost Division Final 1-4 (Generals)
2009–10	36	24	11	1	0	49	2nd, South	Lost Division Final 2-4 (Bisons)
2010–11	36	10	24	0	2	22	5th, South	Did not qualify
2011–12	38	14	21	2	1	31	6th, South	Did not qualify
2012–13	38	23	10	1	4	51	3rd, South	Lost Division Final 0-4 (Bisons)
2013–14	36	16	16	4	0	36	5th, South	Lost Division Quarters 1-2 (Copperheads)
2014–15	38	19	17	2	0	40	4th, South	Lost Division Quarters 0-2 (Wheatland Kings)
2015–16	38	5	33	0	0	10	7th, South	Did not qualify
2016–17	38	8	24	6	0	22	6th, South	Lost Division Quarters 0–2 (Copperheads)
2017–18	36	12	22	2	0	26	6th, South	Lost Division Quarters 1–2 (Generals)
2018–19	38	17	17	4	0	38	5th, South	Lost Division Semifinal 3-4 (Copperheads)
2019–20	38	25	11	2	0	52	3rd, South	Lost Division Semifinal 3-4 (Generals)
2020–21	2	1	1	0	7	9	Remaining season lost to COVID-19 pandemic	
2021–22	36	25	8	3	0	53	2nd of 7, South; 3rd of 14 HJHL	Won Division Semifinal 4-0 (Copperheads); Lost Division Final 2-4 (Bisons)
2022–23	38	27	8	3	0	57	2nd of 6, South; 2nd of 12 HJHL	Won Division Semifinal 4-2 (Generals); Lost Division Final 0-4 (Bisons)
2023–24	38	24	9	5	0	53	2nd of 6, South; 3rd of 13 HJHL	Won Quarterfinal 3-0 (Copperheads); Lost Semifinal 1-3 (Wranglers)
2024–25	38	26	10	2	0	54	3rd of 6, South; 4th of 13 HJHL	Won Div Semifinal 3-1 (Wheatland Kings); Lost Div Final 1-3 (Bisons)
2025–26	36	24	9	3	0	51	1st of 6, South; 4th of 11 HJHL	Won Div Semifinal 3-2 (Bisons); Won Div Final 3-0 (Generals); Won League Finals, 3-0 (Vipers); Advance to Russ Barnes Championships

== Russ Barnes Trophy ==
Alberta Jr B Provincial Championships

Year	Round Robin	Record	Standing	Bronze Medal Game	Gold Medal Game
2026	W, Lloydminster 4–2; W, CNHA Black 2-0; W, Sherwood Park 4–2; L, Vermilion Tigers 1-10	3–1–0	2nd of 6	=	L, La Crete 2–7

== Retired numbers ==
- 1 – Blaine Lacher
- 9 – Murray Craven
- 12 – Justin Bremer

== See also ==
- List of ice hockey teams in Alberta
