= St. Albert Steel =

- City: St. Albert, Alberta
- League: Alberta Junior Hockey League
- Division: North
- Founded: 2007
- Home arena: Servus Place
- Colours: Silver, purple and black

Franchise history
- 1976-2007: Fort Saskatchewan Traders
- 2007-2012: St. Albert Steel
- 2012-present: Whitecourt Wolverines

The St. Albert Steel were an ice hockey team in the Alberta Junior Hockey League (AJHL). They played in St. Albert, Alberta, Canada at Servus Place with a seating capacity of 2,044. The team relocated to Whitecourt in the 2012 off-season to become the Whitecourt Wolverines.

Founded: 2007-08
Relocated: 2012
Division titles won: None
Regular season titles won: None
League Championships won: None
Doyle Cup Titles: None
Royal Bank Cup Titles: None

== History ==
The Steel, relocated in 2007 from nearby Fort Saskatchewan where they were known as the Fort Saskatchewan Traders, were the second team to represent the City of St. Albert. The first team to represent the city was the St. Albert Saints, who relocated to Spruce Grove in 2004 to become the Spruce Grove Saints.

On March 29, 2012, it was announced the team applied to relocate to Whitecourt for the 2012-13 season. On May 3, 2012, the AJHL announced that it approved the relocation of the Steel to Whitecourt to become the Whitecourt Wolverines, taking their name from the simultaneously disbanded junior "B" Whitecourt Wolverines of the North West Junior Hockey League.

== Season-by-season record ==
Note: GP = Games played, W = Wins, L = Losses, T/OTL = Ties/Overtime losses, SOL = Shootout losses, Pts = Points, GF = Goals for, GA = Goals against

Season	GP	W	L	T/OTL	Points	GF	GA	Finish	Playoffs
2007-08	62	24	33	5	53	192	246	7th North	Lost in first round
2008-09	62	29	26	7	65	236	237	6th North	Lost in first round
2009-10	60	24	29	7	55	218	260	6th North	Lost in first round
2010-11	60	26	31	3	55	197	244	7th North	Lost in first round
2011-12	60	9	48	3	21	147	291	8th North	DNQ

=== Playoffs ===
- 2008 Lost Preliminary

Grande Prairie Storm defeated St. Albert Steel 3-games-to-2

- 2009 Lost Preliminary

Sherwood Park Crusaders defeated St. Albert Steel 3-games-to-1

- 2010 Lost Preliminary

Fort McMurray Oil Barons defeated St. Albert Steel 3-games-to-none

- 2011 Lost Preliminary

Fort McMurray Oil Barons defeated St. Albert Steel 3-games-to-none

== See also ==
- List of ice hockey teams in Alberta
