= Red Deer Vipers =

- City: Red Deer, Alberta, Canada
- League: Heritage Junior B Hockey League
- Division: North
- Founded: 1987–88
- Home arena: Servus Arena (formerly Red Deer Arena)
- Colours: Red, Grey, Black, White
- General manager: (Canada) Dale Scott
- Head coach: (Canada) Matt Michalezki
- Website: www.reddeervipers.com/

Franchise history
- 1987-9x: Red Deer Cowboys
- 199x-Present: Red Deer Vipers

Championships
- Playoff championships: HJHL Champions: 6 (1988-89, 1989-90, 1998-99, 2003-04, 2016-17, 2017-18) Provincial Champions: 2 (2003-04, 2005-06) Western Canadian Champions: 1 (2005-06)

The Red Deer Vipers are a Junior "B" Ice Hockey team based in Red Deer, Alberta, Canada. They are members of the North Division of the Heritage Junior B Hockey League (HJHL). They played their home games at Red Deer Arena until 2016 when it was torn down to be rebuilt. The Vipers played home games out of Red Deer's Collicutt Centre which only sat about 500 with standing room for a season & a half. In January 2018, the Vipers returned to downtown Red Deer to play in the new Servus Arena which seats about 1,300.

== History ==
The Red Deer Vipers are an original Heritage Junior B Hockey League team, named as the Red Deer Cowboys beginning in the 1987–88 HJHL season. Shortly after, the Red Deer Cowboys were renamed as the Red Deer Vipers. The Vipers are the 1989, 1999, 2004, 2017 & 2018 HJHL champions, the 2004 and 2006 Russ Barnes Trophy champions, and the 2006 Keystone Cup champions.

The Vipers historical rivals have been the Blackfalds Wranglers who reside a mere 10 minutes north of Red Deer. In recent years the Vipers have developed an intense rivalry with the Airdrie Thunder. The Vipers and Thunder have met in each of the last three post-seasons. In 2016 the Thunder beat the Vipers in seven games in the north semi-final. In 2017 the Vipers beat Airdrie in the north semi-final in six games. The Vipers beat Airdrie in six again in the 2018 north final.

== Media ==
Since the 2016 HJHL playoffs, the Red Deer Vipers have taken it upon themselves to broadcast road games via internet radio. The first ever Vipers play-by-play broadcast was game five of the 2016 HJHL north semi-final against the Airdrie Thunder. Red Deer native Brady Sim called the game using an iPhone with a wifi connection, Periscope & an Xbox gaming headset. The Vipers defeated Airdrie in game five 2–1, but ultimately lost the series to Airdrie 4 games to three.

The Vipers would arrange to have Sim broadcast that year's provincial championships which the Vipers hosted. The Vipers then began broadcasting games on Mixlr.com, where the broadcasts can still be found today.

The 2023-24seasonmarked the first season since the 2002-03 season (no records prior to 2003-04 season) that the Vipers failed to make the playoffs.

== Season-by-season record ==
Note: GP = Games played, W = Wins, L = Losses, T = Ties, OTL = Overtime Losses, Pts = Points, GF = Goals for, GA = Goals against, PIM = Penalties in minutes

Season	GP	W	L	T	OTL	Pts	GF	GA	PIM	Finish	Playoffs
2003–04	36	24	12	0	0	48	225	96	–	2nd, Central	no data
2004–05	40	32	4	1	3	68	302	79		1st, North	no data
2005–06	38	37	0	0	1	75	281	67	1437	1st, North	Lost in HJHL Semifinals, 0–2 (Bisons); Russ Barnes Trophy Champions; Keystone Cup Champions
2006–07	36	24	7	3	2	53	192	88	978	2nd, North	Lost in Division Finals, 0–4 (Wranglers)
2007–08	36	20	9	6	1	47	151	111	781	4th, North	Lost in Division Finals, 1–3 (Wranglers)
2008–09	36	18	14	3	1	40	181	120	1111	4th, North	Lost in Division Finals, 2–3 (Wranglers)
2009–10	36	24	9	1	2	51	216	114	1450	2nd, North	Lost in Finals, 0–2 (Wranglers)
2010–11	36	25	9	2	0	52	220	111	950	2nd, North	Lost in HJHL Semifinals, 1–3 (Bisons)
2011–12	38	26	9	0	3	55	183	106	1412	1st, North	Lost in HJHL Quarter Finals, 1–4 (Colts)
2012–13	38	24	5	6	3	57	203	134	–	2nd, North	Lost in HJHL Finals, 0–3 (Bisons)
2013–14	36	18	17	–	1	37	155	156	–	4th, North	Lost in Elimination Round, 1–2 (Thrashers)
2014–15	38	18	18	–	2	38	176	164	–	4th, North	Won Division Qualifier, 2–1 (Thrashers); Lost in Div. semi-finals, 0–4 (Wranglers)
2015–16	38	25	9	–	4	54	162	113	–	3rd, North	Won Division Qualifier, 2–0 (Stampeders); Lost Div. semi-finals, 3–4 (Thunder)
2016–17	38	25	12	–	1	51	171	123	–	3rd of 7, North; 5 of 14, League	Won Division Qualifier, 2–0 (Stampeders); Won Div. Semi-finals, 4–2 (Thunder); Won Div. Finals, 4–3 (Colts); Won League Finals, 3–1 (Generals) advance to RUSS BARNES TROPHY
2017–18	36	30	5	–	1	61	198	96	–	1st of 7, North; 1st of 13, League	Won Div. Semi-finals, 3–1 (Colts); Won Div. Finals 4–2 (Thunder); Won League Finals, 2–1(Copperheads) advance to RUSS BARNES TROPHY
2018–19	38	29	8	–	1	59	185	102	–	2nd of 7, North 3rd of 14, League	Lost Div. Semi-finals, 4-3 (Colts)
2019–20	38	24	13	–	1	49	156	125	–	2nd of 7, North; 6th of 14, League	Lost Div. Semi-finals, 3–4 (Wranglers)
2020–21	4	4	0	–	0	8	15	5	–	Remaining season lost to COVID-19 pandemic Generals|Generals]])	
2022-23	38	12	24		2	26	128	218		5th of 6, North 10th of 12, League	Lost Division Qualifier 1-2 (Rams)
2023–24	38	12	26	–	x	24	96	192	–	6th of 7, North; 12th of 13, League	Did Not Qualify
2024–25	38	20	17	1	x	35	142	134	–	2nd of 7, North; 5th of 13, League	Won Div Semifinals 3-1 (Colts); Lost Div Finals 0-3 (Wranglers)
2025–26	36	26	8	–	2	56	180	98	–	1st of 6, North; 1st of 12, League	Wpn Div Semifinals 3-2 (Thunder); Won Div. Finals, 3-1 (Wranglers); Lost League Finals, 0-3 (Cubs)

== Russ Barnes Trophy ==
Alberta Jr B Provincial Championships

Year	Round Robin	Record	Standing	SemiFinal	Bronze Medal Game	Gold Medal Game
2004	T, Edmonton Riv Kings 2–2; W, Calgary Stampederes 4–3; W, Vermilion 14–1	2–0–1	1st of 4 Pool	W, Okotos 3–2	n/a	W, Calgary; Russ Barnes Champions
2006	T, Saddle Lake 5–5; L, Edmonton Royals 3–6; W, Ft. St John 5–4	1–1–1	2 of 4 Pool	W, Okotos 3–2	n/a	W, Edmonton Royals 3–2; Russ Barnes Champions
2010	T, North Peace 3–3; L, Lloydminster 2–5 ?, Beverly	?-?-?	? of 4 Pool	n/a	n/a	n/a
2013	W, Grand Prairie 6–4; L, Cold Lake 4–5; W, Wetaskiwin 5–3	2–1–0	2 of 4 Pool	L, Okotos 2–7	L, Cold Lake 3–5	n/a
2016*	L, North Peace 0–3; W, North Edmonton 4–2; W, Killam 2–1	2–1–0	2nd of 4 Pool	L, Wainwright 1–3	L, Wetaskiwin 2–3	n/a
2017	W, St. Paul, 4–2; L, Wetaskiwin, 1–2; L, CBHA Rangers, 2–3	1–2–0	4th of 4 Pool	did not qualify	n/a	n/a
2018	W, Calgary Royals Gold, 4–1; W, North Peace Navigators, 5–4; W, Beverly Warriors, 6–2	3–0–0	1st of 4 Pool A	W, Wetaskiwin 3–1	n/a	L, Wainwright 1–5

- 2016 Hosts

== Keystone Cup ==
Western Canadian Jr. B Championships(Northern Ontario to British Columbia)
Six teams in round robin play. 1st vs 2nd for gold/silver & 3rd vs. 4th for bronze.

Year	Round Robin	Record	Standing	Bronze Medal Game	Gold Medal Game
2004	L, Richmond 3–4; W, Regina 4–3; W, Norway House 5–4; W, Aguasabon 10–1; L, Thunder Bay 1–3	3–2–0	3 of 6	W, Thunder Bay 4–3; Bronze Medal	n/a
2006	W, Saskatoon 6–2; L, Campbell River 1–2; W, Delta 4–0; W, Thunder Bay 6–0; T, N Winnipeg 0–0	3–1–1	2 of 6	n/a	OTW, Campbell River 3–2; KEYSTONE CUP CHAMPIONS

== NHL alumni ==
- Brad Leeb
- Paul Manning
- Derek Morris

== Awards and trophies ==
Keystone Cup

- 2005–06

Russ Barnes Trophy

- 2003–04, 2005–06

HJHL Championship

- 1988–89, 1998–99, 2003–04, 2016–17, 2017–18

== See also ==
- List of ice hockey teams in Alberta
