= Fort St. John Huskies =

- City: Fort St. John, British Columbia, Canada
- League: NWJHL
- Founded: 1966–67
- Home arena: North Peace Arena
- Colours: Black, Gold, White
- President: Michael Bacso
- General manager: (Canada) Jeremy Clothier
- Head coach: (Canada) Gary Alexander
- Website: www.fsjhuskies.com/

Franchise history
- 1966-81: Fort St. John Golden Hawks
- 1981–present: Fort St. John Huskies

The Fort St. John Huskies are a Canadian Junior "B" ice hockey team based in Fort St. John, British Columbia, Canada. They are former members of the Peace-Cariboo Jr. B, Jr. A, and Rocky Mountain Junior Hockey League and current members of the Jr. B North West Junior Hockey League of Hockey Alberta.

== History ==
The Golden Hawks were founded in 1966. In the 1970s they were members of the Peace Junior B Hockey League. In 1975, the league became the Peace-Cariboo Junior B Hockey League. In 1980, the Peace-Cariboo League was promoted to Jr. A, and the Golden Hawks with it.

In 1981, the Golden Hawks became the Huskies. In 1991, the PCJHL expanded into the Kootenays and became the Rocky Mountain Junior Hockey League. In 1996, as many of the Peace-Cariboo area dropped out of the RMJHL to join the British Columbia Hockey League, the Huskies elected to join Hockey Alberta's newly formed North West Junior Hockey League, reuniting them with traditional opponents like the Dawson Creek Jr. Canucks. The Huskies have been members ever since.

== Season-by-season standings ==
Season results from 1975 to 1996 for PCJrB - PCHL - RMJHL
Season	GP	W	L	T	OTL	GF	GA	P	Results	Playoffs
1975-76	40	23	16	1	-	242	186	49	2nd, PC Jr. B	Lost semi-final
1976-77	40	22	17	1	-	219	205	45	2nd, PC Jr. B	
1977-78	40	25	15	0	-	252	183	50	2nd, PC Jr. B	
1978-79	36	28	8	0	-	236	146	56	2nd, PC Jr. B	
1979-80	48	28	18	2	-	264	193	58	3rd, PC Jr. B	
1980-81	40	19	20	1	-	192	205	39	4th, PCJHL	Lost final
1981-82	56	31	25	0	-	306	263	62	4th, PCJHL	Lost semi-final
1982-83	40	12	28	0	-	229	270	24	5th, PCJHL	DNQ
1983-84	50	16	34	0	-	245	375	32	5th, PCJHL	DNQ
1984-85	48	32	15	1	-	316	204	65	1st, PCJHL	Lost final
1985-86	50	28	22	0	-	294	251	56	3rd, PCJHL	Lost semi-final
1986-87	48	27	19	2	-	243	239	56	3rd, PCJHL	Lost semi-final
1987-88	50	7	42	1	-	183	374	15	6th, PCJHL	DNQ
1988-89	52	29	23	0	-	276	249	58	3rd, PCJHL	Lost semi-final
1989-90	52	42	9	1	-	417	195	85	1st, PCJHL	Lost final
1990-91	54	24	28	2	-	256	300	50	3rd, PCJHL	Lost semi-final
1991-92	52	33	17	2	-	348	280	68	2nd, RMJHL-PC	Lost semi-final
1992-93	52	15	36	-	1	286	305	31	5th, RMJHL-PC	DNQ
1993-94	52	35	15	-	2	315	257	72	2nd, RMJHL-PC	Lost final
1994-95	52	21	31	-	0	245	299	42	4th, RMJHL-PC	Lost quarter-final
1995-96	58	28	29	-	1	319	313	57	3rd, RMJHL-PC	Lost quarter-final
1996-08	NWJHL Statistics Not Available									

== Season-by-season record ==
Latest results
2008-09	35	23	10	-	2	174	137	48	2nd, NWJHL	no information
2009-10	35	23	10	-	2	177	121	48	2nd, NWJHL	Won quarterfinals 3-2, (Blades); Lost semifinal 0-4, (Wheelers)
2010-11	35	14	21	-	0	120	175	28	5th, NWJHL	Lost quarterfinal 0-3, (Jr. Canucks)
2011-12	35	18	17	-	1	168	177	37	4th, NWJHL	Won quarterfinals 3-1, (Vipers); Lost semifinal 1-4, (Navigators)
2012-13	35	14	18	-	3	144	150	31	5th, NWJHL	Won quarterfinals 3-0, (Wolves); Lost semifinal 1-4, (Kings)
2013-14	35	24	9	-	2	187	107	50	3rd, NWJHL	Won quarterfinals 3-0, (Wolves); Lost semifinal 1-4, (Kings)
2014-15	30	14	16	-	-	-	-	28	5th of 7 NWJHL	Won quarterfinals 3-0, (Jr. Canucks); Lost semifinal 0-4, (Navigators)
2015-16	36	20	16	-	-	162	133	40	4th of 7 NWJHL	Won quarterfinals 3-0, (Vipers); Lost semifinal 2-4, (Flyers)
2016-17	30	17	10	-	3	103	88	37	3rd of 6 NWJHL	Won quarterfinals 3-0, (Vipers); Lost semifinals, 3-4 (Navigators)
2017-18	36	27	7	-	2	189	79	56	1st of 7 NWJHL	Quarterfinals - bye Won semifinals 4-1, (Kings); Won League Finals 4-1 (Navigators); Advance to Russ Barnes Trophy
2018-19	36	23	10	-	3	153	116	49	1st of 6 NWJHL	Won semifinals 4-3, (Navigators); Won League Finals 4-2 (Kings); Advance to Russ Barnes Trophy
2019-20	40	33	5	2	-	216	109	68	1st of 6 NWJHL	Won semifinals 4-0, (Flyers); Incomplete League Finals 0-0 (Navigators) canelled due to COVID-19
2020–21	3	3	0	0	0	17	5	6	Season cancelled due to COVID-19 pandemic	
2021-22	40	38	2	0	-	195	85	76	1st of 6 NWJHL	Won semifinals 4-2, (Kodiaks); Won League Finals 4-2 (Kings); Advance to Russ Barnes Trophy
2022-23	42	38	3	1	-	238	79	77	1st of 8 NWJHL	Won semifinals 4-0, (Kodiaks); Won League Finals 4-2 (Kings); Advance to Russ Barnes Trophy
2023-24	42	36	5	1	-	191	77	73	1st of 8 NWJHL	Won semifinals 4-2, (Navigators); Lost League Finals 1-4 (Lumber Barons)
2024-25	40	34	4	2	-	213	94	70	1st of 4 E/W Div; 1st of 8 NWJHL	Won Div Semifinals 0-3, (Flyers); Won Div Finals 4-0 (Kodiaks); Won League Finals4-2 (Lumber Barons); Advance to Russ Barnes Trophy
2025-26	40	30	9	1	-	211	114	60	1st of 4 E/W Div; 2nd of 8 NWJHL	Won Div Semifinals 3-2, (Flyers); Won Div Finals 4-1 (Navigators); Lost League Finals 0-4 (Lumber Barons)

=== Playoffs ===
- 1981 Lost final

Fort St. John Golden Hawks defeated Quesnel Millionaires 4-games-to-1
Prince George Spruce Kings defeated Fort St. John Golden Hawks 4-games-to-3

- 1982 Lost semi-final

Prince George Spruce Kings defeated Fort St. John Huskies 4-games-to-3

- 1983 DNQ
- 1984 DNQ
- 1985 Lost final

Fort St. John Huskies defeated Grande Prairie North Stars 4-games-to-2
Prince George Spruce Kings defeated Fort St. John Huskies 4-games-to-none

- 1986 Lost semi-final

Williams Lake Mustangs defeated Fort St. John Huskies 4-games-to-2

- 1987 Lost semi-final

Grande Prairie North Stars defeated Fort St. John Huskies 4-games-to-3

- 1988 DNQ
- 1989 Lost semi-final

Williams Lake Mustangs defeated Fort St. John Huskies 4-games-to-1

- 1990 Lost final

Fort St. John Huskies defeated Quesnel Millionaires 4-games-to-none
Prince George Spruce Kings defeated Fort St. John Huskies 4-games-to-none

- 1991 Lost semi-final

Williams Lake Mustangs defeated Fort St. John Huskies 4-games-to-none

- 1992 Lost semi-final

Fort St. John Huskies defeated Williams Lake Mustangs 4-games-to-1
Prince George Spruce Kings defeated Fort St. John Huskies 4-games-to-2

- 1993 DNQ
- 1994 Lost final

Fort St. John Huskies defeated Grande Prairie Chiefs 4-games-to-3
Fort St. John Huskies defeated Prince George Spruce Kings 4-games-to-2
Kimberley Dynamiters defeated Fort St. John Huskies 4-games-to-1

- 1995 Lost quarter-final

Prince George Spruce Kings defeated Fort St. John Huskies 4-games-to-none

- 1996 Lost quarter-final

Prince George Spruce Kings defeated Fort St. John Huskies 4-games-to-1

== Russ Barnes Trophy ==
Alberta Jr B Provincial Championships Eight teams broken into 2 pools compete - ONly the applicable pool shown.

Year	Round Robin	Record	Standing	Semifinal	Bronze Medal Game	Gold Medal Game
2018 (HOST)	L, Coaldale 0-5; L, Wainwright 3-5; L, Wetaskiwin 2-4	0-3-0	4th of 4 Pool B	Did not qualify for playoffs	n/a	n/a
2019	L, Wainwright 4-6; W, Coaldale 4-2; L, Wetaskiwin 3-8	1-2-0	4th of 4 Pool B	Did not qualify for playoffs	n/a	n/a
2022	L, Cochrane Generals 4-5; W, Beaumont Chiefs 3-2; W, St Paul Canadians 5-3	2-1-0	2nd of 4 Pool B	W Okotoks Bisons 5-2	n/a	W, Cochrane Generals 6-0; Russ Barnes Champions
2023	L, Okotoks Bisons 2-4; L, Sherwood Park Knights 0-3; L, Wainwright Bisons 0-5; W, CBHA Rangers 3-2	1-3-0	5th of 6 Full Table	Did not qualify for playoffs	n/a	n/a
2025	L, Morinville Jets 0-1; W, NWCAA Stampeders 5-1; L, Wainwright Bisons 2-3; W, Sherwood Park Knights 6-2	2-2-0	4th of 6 Full Table	no playoff format	Lost - 1-4; Sylvan Lake Wranglers	n/a

== NHL alumni ==
- Dody Wood
- Tim Hunter
