= Okotoks Bisons =

Ice hockey team

- City: Okotoks, Alberta, Canada
- League: Heritage Junior B Hockey League
- Division: South
- Founded: 1985–86
- Home arena: Murray Arena
- Colours: Navy Blue, red, white
- General manager: (Canada) Trevor McFarlane
- Head coach: (Canada) Brad Cobb
- Website: www.okotoksbisons.com/

Franchise history
- 1985–1990: Okotoks 85ers
- 1990–2002: Foothills Bisons
- 2002–present: Okotoks Bisons

The Okotoks Bisons are a junior "B" ice hockey team based in Okotoks, Alberta, Canada. They are members of the South Division of the Heritage Junior B Hockey League (HJHL). They play their home games at Murray Arena.

== History ==
Division titles won: 1996, 1997, 2003, 2004, 2005, 2006, 2007, 2011, 2012, 2013, 2014, 2022, 2023, 2024
League Championships won: 1996, 1997, 2001, 2002, 2003, 2005, 2006, 2011, 2012, 2013, 2014, 2022, 2023, 2024
Alberta Provincial entries: 1996, 1997, 2001, 2002, 2003, 2004, 2005, 2006, 2011, 2012, 2013, 2022, 2023, 2024
Alberta Provincial titles: 2013, 2024
Keystone Cup titles: none

Founded in 1985, the Bisons were originally known as the Okotoks 85ers and played in the Southern Alberta Junior Hockey League. They moved to the Calgary Junior Hockey League in 1989 – changing to the Foothills Bisons one year later – before settling in the Heritage Junior B Hockey League (HJHL) in 1991.

The Bisons have recorded significant success in HJHL competition, with 20 League Final appearances, 17 first-place finishes, 14 HJHL Playoff Championships, 10 Provincial Medals, and one Western Canadian Championship Medal. The program has also received high national rankings in recent seasons, including No. 1 in 2023–24, No. 2 in 2022–23, and No. 4 in 2021–22.

The Bisons were at their all-time high between 2011 and 2014 where they made league history by being the first and only team since to win four consecutive league titles in the HJHL. A feat they had come close to in 2001–2003 winning three consecutively. Today, the Bisons look to capture their fourth consecutive league championships as they have most recently been crowned League Champs in 2022, 2023 & 2024.

== Season-by-season record ==
Note: GP = Games played, W = Wins, L = Losses, T = Ties, OTL = Overtime Losses, Pts = Points, GF = Goals for, GA = Goals against, PIM = Penalties in minutes

Season	GP	W	L	T	OTL	Pts	GF	GA	PIM	Finish	Playoffs
1995–96	37	33	3	1	—	67	304	97	—	1st, Overall	HJHL Champions
1996–97	36	30	6	—	—	60	233	110	—	1st, Overall	HJHL Champions
1997–98	37	25	12	0	—	50	224	154	—	4th, Overall	Lost in Semifinals
1998–99	37	27	8	2	—	56	214	116	—	3rd, Overall	Lost in Finals
1999–00	37	32	3	2	—	66	306	122	—	2nd, Overall	Lost in Semifinals
2000–01	37	30	5	2	—	62	285	115	—	2nd, Overall	HJHL Champions
2001–02	38	30	7	1	—	61	231	116	—	2nd, Overall	HJHL Champions
2002–03	36	30	6	0	—	60	207	76	—	1st, South	HJHL Champions
2003–04	36	33	2	1	0	67	241	75	—	1st, South	Lost in Finals
2004–05	37	33	3	1	0	67	314	90	—	1st, South	HJHL Champions
2005–06	38	36	1	0	1	73	352	74	1406	1st, South	HJHL Champions, 2–0 (Vipers)
2006–07	36	30	4	1	1	62	210	112	1486	1st, South	Lost Round Robin Finals, 1–3 (Wranglers)
2007–08	36	21	10	1	4	47	166	132	1225	4th, South	Lost semifinals, 3–4 (Generals)
2008–09	36	19	12	2	3	43	194	135	1122	3rd, South	Lost semifinals, 3–4 (Generals)
2009–10	36	29	2	2	3	63	178	83	1100	1st, South	Lost semifinals, 1–3 (Vipers)
2010–11	36	25	11	0	0	50	172	103	995	1st, South	HJHL Champions, 2–1 (Wranglers)
2011–12	38	31	6	1	0	63	262	130	—	1st, South	HJHL Champions, vs. (Thrashers); Russ Barnes Trophy; Alberta Silver Medal
2012–13	38	33	2	2	1	69	223	95	—	1st, South	HJHL Champions, 3–0 (Vipers); Russ Barnes Trophy – Alberta Champion; Keystone Cup – Bronze Medal
2013–14	36	26	9	—	1	53	165	116	—	1st, South	HJHL Champions, 3–2 (Wranglers); Russ Barnes Trophy eliminated pool round
2014–15	38	23	13	—	2	48	162	123	?	3rd, South	Won Div. Qualifier, 0–2 (Academy Bears); Won Div. Semifinals, 4–0 (Generals); Lost Div. Finals, 0–4 (Copperheads)
2015–16	38	29	9	—	0	58	214	119	—	2nd, South	Lost div. semi-finals, 2–4 (Copperheads)
2016–17	38	26	11	—	1	53	194	135	—	2nd of 7, South; 4 of 14, HJHL	Lost div. semi-finals, 3–4 (Copperheads)
2017–18	36	24	10	—	2	50	179	115	—	2nd of 7, South; 3 of 13, HJHL	Div. Quarterfinals — bye Won Div. Semifinals, 3–0 (Generals); Lost Div. Finals, 1–4 (Copperheads)
2018–19	38	27	7	—	4	38	171	93	—	2nd of 7, South; 4 of 14, HJHL	Lost div. semi-finals, 1–4 (Generals)
2019–20	38	35	2	—	1	71	232	84	—	1st of 7, South; 1st of 14, HJHL	Won Div. Semifinals, 4–0 (Flyers); Incomplete Div. Finals, 2–1 (Generals)
2020–21	3	3	0	–	0	6	18	4	–	Remaining season lost to COVID-19 pandemic	
2021–22	36	33	2	—	1	67	248	67	—	1st of 7, South; 1st of 14, HJHL	Won Div. Semifinals, 4–1 (Wheat Kings); Won Division Finals 4–2 (Cubs); Won League Finals 3–0 (Generals); HJBHL CHAMPIONS; Advance to Russ Barnes Championships
2022–23	38	35	3	—	0	70	188	76	—	1st of 6, South; 1st of 14, HJHL	Won Div. Semifinals, 4–0 (Wheat Kings); Won Division Finals 4–0 (Cubs); Won League Finals 3–0 (Wranglers); HJBHL CHAMPIONS; Host Russ Barnes Championships
2023–24	38	34	3	—	1	69	185	68	—	1st of 6, South; 1st of 13, HJHL	Won Quarterfinals, 3-1 (Flyers); Won Semifinals 3–0 (Rams); Won League Finals 4-2 (Wranglers); HJBHL CHAMPIONS; Advance to Russ Barnes Championships
2024–25	38	32	5	—	1	65	186	82	—	1st of 6, South; 2nd of 13, HJHL	Won Quarterfinals, 3-1 (Generals); Won Semifinals 3–1 (Cubs); Lost League Finals 1-3 (Wranglers)
2025–26	36	18	16	—	2	38	153	117	—	5th of 6, South; 8th of 11, HJHL	Won PlayIn , 2-0 (Copperheads); Lost Semifinals 2-3 (Cubs)

== Russ Barnes Trophy ==
Alberta Jr B Provincial Championships

Year	Round Robin	Record	Standing	Semifinal	Bronze Medal Game	Gold Medal Game
2003	W, St. Paul Canadiens 5–2; W, Calgary Royal Gold 3–1; W, Spruce Grove Regals 6–3	3–0–0	n/a	L, Fort St. John Huskies 1–3	W, Lloydminster Bandits 7–5; Bronze Medalists	n/a
2005	L, North Peace Navigators 2–4; W, Calgary Bruins 7–0; T, Beverly Warriors 4–4	1–1–1	n/a	L, Calgary Stampeders 4–6	L, North Peace Navigators 1–3	n/a
2006	W, N Edmonton Red Wings 5–3; W, Calgary Stampeders 6–2; T, Grande Prairie Wheelers 6–6	2–0–1	n/a	L, Red Deer Vipers 2–3	W, N Edmonton Red Wings 5–4; Bronze Medalists	n/a
2011	L, North Peace Navigators 6–8; L, Beaumont Chiefs 3–6; W, Calgary Blazers 4–2	1–2–0	n/a	Did not qualify	n/a	n/a
2012	L, Whitecourt Wolverines 3–4; W, Spruce Grove Regals 2–3; W, Killam 6–0	1–2–0	n/a	W, Edmonton Royals 5–2	n/a	L, Whitecourt Wolverines 1–5 'Silver Medalists
2013	T, Wainwright Bisons, 2–2; W, Sherwood Park Knights, 6–2; W, Calgary Rangers, 7–1	2–0–1	n/a	W, Red Deer Vipers, 7–2	n/a	W, Sherwood Park Knights, 8–4; GOLD MEDALIST; Advance to Keystone Cup
2022	W, Wainwright Bisons, 4–0; T, Sherwood Park Knights, 6–6; W, CBHA Rangers, 2–0	2–0–1	1st of 4 Pool B	L, Fort St. John Huskies 2–5	W, Sherwood Park Knights 5–2; Bronze Medalists	n/a
2023; HOST	W, Fort St. John Huskies, 5–4; W, Sylvan Lake Wranglers, 4–0; W, Sherwood Park Knights, 6–3; L, Wainwright Bisons 4–5	3–1–1	1st of 6	no semi's	n/a	L, Wainwright Bisons 1–3; Silver Medalists
2024	W, St. Albert Merchants, 6-5; L, La Crete Lumber Barons, 1-5; W, North Peace Navigators, 5-3; W, Wainwright Bisons, 4-3	3-1–0	2nd of 6	n/a	n/a	Won 6-3; La Crete Lumber Barons; Gold Medalists

== Awards and trophies ==
HJHL Championship

- 1995–96, 1996–97, 2000–01, 2001–02, 2002–03, 2004–05, 2005–06, 2010–11, 2011–12, 2012–13, 2021–22, 2022-23, 2023-24

ALBERTA Championship

- 2013, 2024

== See also ==
- List of ice hockey teams in Alberta
