= County of Grande Prairie Wheat Kings =

- City: Grande Prairie, Alberta, Canada
- League: NWJHL
- Founded: 1994–95
- Home arena: Crosslink County Sportsplex
- Colours: Black, White, Silver
- General manager: (Canada) Kyle Chapple
- Head coach: (Canada) Kyle Chapple
- Website: grandeprairiejdakings.com

Franchise history
- 1994–2011: Grande Prairie Wheelers
- 2011–2024: County of Grande Prairie JDA Kings
- 2024–present: County of Grande Prairie Wheat Kings

The County of Grande Prairie Wheat Kings, formerly the Grande Prairie Wheelers until April 2011 and the County of Grande Grande Prairie Kings until 2024, are a Junior "B" Ice Hockey team based in Grande Prairie, Alberta, Canada. They are members of the North West Junior Hockey League (NWJHL). The Kings moved from the Coca-Cola Centre to the Crosslink Sports Centre in January 2014, which has a capacity of 600.

== History ==
The Kings (formerly the Wheelers) joined the NWJHL when the league began operations in 1994. It took the Kings nearly 20 years to capture their first league championship but did so on March 26, 2013.

In the 2013-2014 NWJHL season the Kings hosted the Hockey Alberta Investors Group Junior B Provincial Championship. Despite losing the NWJHL finals to the North Peace Navigators, Grande Prairie had already secured a spot as tournament host. The Kings captured a silver medal falling 6 to 0 to the Blackfalds Wranglers in the provincial final.

== Season-by-season record ==
Note: GP = Games played, W = Wins, L = Losses, OTL = Overtime Losses, Pts = Points, GF = Goals for, GA = Goals against, PIM = Penalties in minutes

Season	GP	W	L	OTL	Pts	GF	GA	PIM	Finish	Playoffs
2009-10	35	19	14	2	40	153	162	1471	3rd NWJHL	Won quarterfinals 3-0, (Vipers); Won semifinals 4-0, (Huskies); Lost in Finals, 0-4 (Wolverines)
2010-11	35	20	9	6	46	158	112	998	3rd NWJHL	Won quarterfinals 3-0, (Huskies); Lost in Semifinals, 1-4 (Navigators)
2011-12	36	30	6	0	60	228	93	941	2nd NWJHL	Won quarterfinals 3-0, (Jr. Canucks); Lost in semi-finals, 0-4 (Wolverines)
2012-13	35	32	3	0	64	257	98		1st NWJHL	Won quarterfinals 3-0, (Vipers); Won semi-finals, 4-1 (Huskies); Won finals, 4-2 (Navigators); League champions
2013-14	35	27	6	2	56	228	128	1471	2nd NWJHL	Won quarterfinals 3-0, (Vipers); Won semifinals 1-1, (Fairview Flyers); Lost finals, 1-4 (Navigators)
2014-15	30	24	5	1	49	-	-	-	2nd of 7 NWJHL	Won quarterfinals (forfeit), (Blades); Lost semi-finals, 2-4 (Fairview Flyers)
2015-16	36	21	14	1	43	173	131	-	3rd of 7 NWJHL	Won quarterfinals 3-0, (Jr. Canucks); Lost semi-finals, 4-1 (Navigators)
2016-17	30	13	13	4	30	104	105	-	5th of 6 NWJHL	Won quarterfinals 3-1, (Jr. Canucks); Lost semifinals 3-4, (Fairview Flyers)
2017-18	36	21	13	2	44	146	128	-	4th of 7 NWJHL	Won quarterfinals 3-2, (Fairview Flyers) lost semifinal 1-4 (Huskies)
2018-19	36	19	15	2	40	151	141	-	3rd of 7 NWJHL	Won quarterfinals 3-2, (Vipers); Won semifinal 4-3 (Jr. Canucks); Lost League Finals 2-4 (Huskies) advance to Barnes Cup as League finalist
2019-20	40	14	21	5	33	128	161	-	5th of 7 NWJHL	Lost quarterfinals 2-3, (Fairview Flyers)
2020–21	5	5	0	0	10	32	13	—	Season cancelled due to covid-19 pandemic	
2021-22	40	19	20	0	38	148	147	-	3rd of 7 NWJHL	Won quarterfinals 3-0, (Navigators); Won semifinals 2-4(Kodiaks); Lost finals, 2-4 (Huskies)
2022–23	42	32	7	3	67	148	147	-	2nd of 8 NWJHL	Won quarterfinals 3-0, (Blades); Won semifinals 4-0(Vipers); Lost finals, 2-4 (Huskies)
2023-24	42	18	10	4	60	181	122	-	3rd of 8 NWJHL	Lost quarterfinals 1-3, (Navigators)
2024-25	40	25	15	0	50	179	149	-	2nd of 4 N/S Div; 3 of 8 NWJHL	Lost Div Semi 2-3, (Blades)
2025-26	40	22	17	1	45	168	149	-	2nd of 4 N/S Div; 3rd of 8 NWJHL	Won Div Semifinal 3-0, (Navigators); Lost Div Finals 1-4 (Lumber Barons)

== Russ Barnes Trophy ==
Alberta Jr B Provincial Championships

Year	Round Robin	Record	Standing	Semifinal	Bronze Medal Game	Gold Medal Game
2013	L, Red Deer Vipers 4-6; W, Wetaskiwin Icemen 6-2; L, Cold Lake Ice 4-6	1-2-0	3rd of 4 Pool ?	n/a	n/a	n/a
2014; HOST	W, Blackfalds Wranglers 6-4; L, Cold Lake Ice 5-3; W, Ft. Sask Hawks 2-1	2-1-0	1st of Pool B	W, North Peace Navigators 6-2	n/a	L, Blackfalds Wranglers 6-0
2019	tbd, Calgary Royals Gold 0-0 tbd, Airdrie Thunder 0-0 tbd, Beverly Warriors 0-0	0-0-0	tbd of Pool A	tbd	n/a	n/a
