= Airdrie Thunder =

- City: Airdrie, Alberta
- League: Heritage Junior B Hockey League
- Division: North
- Home arena: Ron Ebbesen Arena
- Colours: Red, Black, White
- General manager: (Canada) Larry Smith
- Head coach: (Canada) Derek Stamp
- Website: Airdrie Thunder website

Franchise history
- ?-present: Airdrie Thunder

The Airdrie Thunder are a Junior "B" Ice Hockey team based in Airdrie, Alberta, Canada. They are members of the North Division of the Heritage Junior B Hockey League (HJHL). They play their home games at Ron Ebbesen Arena.

== History ==
Division titles won: 2005, 2007, 2008, 2009, 2019
League Championships won: 1997, 2000, 2019
Alberta Provincial entries: 1997, 2000, 2005, 2019
Alberta Provincial titles: 2019
Keystone Cup titles: none

The Airdrie Thunder developed an intense rivalry with their former divisional counterparts, the Okotoks Bisons. The Thunder handed the Bisons their only two losses in the 2005–06 season, while the four victories for Okotoks were the only four games the Thunder lost. The Bisons eliminated the Thunder in the league semi-finals.

The two rivals also met in the 2005 HJHL finals, with Okotoks again coming out the victors in a tough five-game series. Despite losing the championship, the Thunder qualified for the Alberta Provincials, held in Calgary but failed to advance to the medal round.

Airdrie's best season to date was 1999–2000, when they captured their second league title in four years before going on to win the silver medal at the Alberta Provincial Junior B Hockey Championship, which was also hosted by the Thunder.

The Thunder have played in the North Division since 2011–12. In recent years the Thunder have developed a heated rivalry with the Red Deer Vipers. The Vipers and Thunder have now met in three consecutive playoff series. The Thunder knocked off Red Deer in seven games in the 2016 north semi-final. The Vipers have exacted revenge twice since, beating Airdrie in six games in the 2017 north semi-final and 2018 north final.

== Season-by-season record ==
Note: GP = Games played, W = Wins, L = Losses, T = Ties, OTL = Overtime Losses, Pts = Points, GF = Goals for, GA = Goals against, PIM = Penalties in minutes

Season	GP	W	L	T	OTL	Pts	GF	GA	PIM	Finish	Playoffs
2000–01	38	28	5	2	3	61	218	113		1st, North	---
2002–03	36	27	8	0	1	55	181	100		2nd, South	Lost South Div. Finals
2004–05	40	28	11	0	1	57	238	125		3rd, North	Lost Finals
2005–06	38	34	4	0	0	68	310	93	1415	2nd, South	Lost Div. Finals, 0–4 (Bisons)
2006–07	36	24	7	3	2	53	204	116	1221	1st, Central	Lost Round Robin Finals, 2–2 (Wranglers)
2007–08	36	28	8	0	0	56	212	119	1781	1st, Foothills	Lost Div. Finals, 1–3 (Bisons)
2008–09	36	26	9	0	1	53	223	127	1775	2nd, South	Lost Div. Finals, 2–3 (Bisons)
2009–10	36	24	10	2	0	50	182	107	1478	1st, Central	Lost Semifinals, 2–3 (Wranglers)
2010–11	36	23	12	1	0	47	181	136	974	3rd, Central	Lost Div. Semifinals, 2–3 (Thrashers)
2011–12	38	20	13	5	0	45	179	128	–	4th, North	Lost First Round, ?-? (Colts)
2012–13	38	18	15	3	2	41	145	125	–	3rd, North	Lost Div. Semifinals, 2–3 (Red Deer Vipers)
2013–14	36	15	19	–	2	32	141	145	–	6th, North	Did not qualify
2014–15	38	23	13	–	2	48	152	125	–	2nd, North	Lost Div. Semifinals, 2–4 (Mountainview Colts)
2015–16	38	26	10	–	2	54	193	120	–	2nd, North	Won Div. Semifinals, 4–3 (Vipers); Lost Div. Finals 0–4 (Colts)
2016–17	38	27	8	–	3	57	213	131	–	2nd of 7, Nor; 3 of 14 HJHL	Lost Div. Semifinals, 2–4 (Vipers)
2017–18	38	23	9	–	4	50	193	131	–	2nd of 7, Nor; 4 of 13 HJHL	Won Div. Semifinals, 3–1 (Wranglers); Lost Div. Finals, 2–4 (Vipers)
2018–19	38	35	3	–	0	70	–	–	–	1st of 7, Nor; 1st of 14 HJHL	Won Div. Semifinals, 4–0 (Wranglers); Won Div. Finals, 4–2 (Colts); Won League Finals 3–0 (Copperheads); Heritage Jr B CHAMPIONS; Advance to Alberta Championships (see below)
2019–20	38	29	7	–	2	60	–	–	–	1st of 7, Nor; 2nd of 14 HJHL	Lost Div. Semifinals, 2–4 (Colts)
2020–21	3	3	1	–	0	6	–	–	–	Season lost to COVID-19 pandemic	
2021–22	36	17	15	–	2	36	–	–	–	5th of 7, Nor; 8th of 14 HJHL	Won Div. Quarterfinals, 3–0 (Colts); Lost Div. Semifinals, 1–4 (Vipers)
2022–23	38	23	13	–	2	48	150	135	–	2nd of 6, Nor; 5th of 12 HJHL	Won Div. Semifinals, 4–2 (Colts); Lost Div. Finals, 2–4 (Wranglers)
2023–24	38	11	23	–	4	26	–	–	–	5th of 7, Nor; 11th of 13 HJHL	Won Div. Play In, 2–0 (Thrashers); Lost Div. Quarterfinals, 0–3 (Wranglers)
2024–25	38	16	20	–	2	34	112	150	–	4th of 7, Nor; 8th of 13 HJHL	Won Div. Play In, 2–0 (Thrashers); Lost Div. Quarterfinals, 0–3 (Wranglers)
2025–26	36	16	16	–	4	36	–	–	–	4th of 6, Nor; 9th of 12 HJHL	Won Div. Play In, 2–1 (Rams); Lost Div. Semifinals, 1-3 (Vipers)

== Russ Barnes Trophy ==
Alberta Jr B Provincial Championships

Year	Round Robin	Record	Standing	SemiFinal	Bronze Medal Game	Gold Medal Game
2019*	W, Beverly Warriors 4–2; W, Grande Prairie Kings 5–2; W, Won CRAA Gold 7–4	3–0–0	1st of 4 Pool	W, Wetaskiwin Icemen 8–0	n/a	W, Wainwright Bisons 4–3 OT; Russ Barnes Champions

- Alberta withdrew from Keystone Cup – Western Canada Jr. B Championships

== See also ==
- List of ice hockey teams in Alberta
