= Whitecourt Wolverines (2008–2012) =

Canadian junior ice hockey team

- City: Whitecourt, Alberta, Canada
- League: NWJHL
- Founded: 2007
- Home arena: Scott Safety Centre
- Colours: Black, Vegas Gold, White
- General manager: (Canada) Brent Stark
- Head coach: (Canada) Normand Lacombe
- Website: www.whitecourtwolverines.com

Franchise history
- 2008–2012: Whitecourt Wolverines

The Whitecourt Wolverines were a junior "B" ice hockey team based in Whitecourt, Alberta, Canada. They were members of the North West Junior Hockey League (NWJHL) and played their home games out of the Scott Safety Centre.

== History ==
Founded in August 2007, the Wolverines played their inaugural season in 2007–08, appearing in the league finals, losing in the seventh game to the Peace River Navigators.

The Wolverines have appeared in the NWJHL finals in each of its five seasons. Its four consecutive championships from 2008–09 to 2011–12 is a league record for consecutive championships by a team. The team also holds the league record for most championships by a team.

The Wolverines won silver medals in the 2008–09 and 2009–10 Hockey Alberta Junior "B" Provincial Championships, losing to the Russ Barnes Trophy winners Lloydminster Bandits and Beaumont Chiefs respectively. After losing in the bronze medal game in 2010–11, the team defeated the host Okotoks Bisons in the gold medal game in 2011–12 to win its first provincial title. The team proceeded to the Keystone Cup tournament where it took home the bronze medal.

On May 2, 2012, shortly after its first Keystone Cup appearance, the Alberta Junior Hockey League (AJHL) announced it approved a request to relocate the St. Albert Steel from St. Albert to Whitecourt for play in the 2012–2013 season. As a result, the junior "B" Wolverines disbanded and relinquished its team name to the relocated AJHL franchise, the Whitecourt Wolverines.

== Season-by-season record ==
Note: GP = Games played, W = Wins, L = Losses, OTL = Overtime Losses, Pts = Points, GF = Goals for, GA = Goals against, PIM = Penalties in minutes

Season	GP	W	L	OTL	Pts	GF	GA	PIM	Finish	Playoffs
2007–08										Lost in final, 3-4 (Navigators)
2008–09	35	32	3	0	64	247	92	1,225	1st, NWJHL	NWJHL champions, 4-0 (Huskies)
2009–10	35	34	1	0	68	228	80	1,344	1st, NWJHL	NWJHL champions, 4-0 (Wheelers)
2010-11	35	33	2	0	66	216	50	730	1st, NWJHL	NWJHL champions, 4-2 (Navigators)
2011–12	36	27	8	1	55	211	88	1,159	3rd, NWJHL	NWJHL champions, 4-0 (Navigators)

== Awards and trophies ==
NWJHL championship

- 2008–09, 2009–10, 2010–11, 2011–12

Provincial championship

- Russ Barnes Trophy (gold medal): 2011–12
- Silver medal: 2008–09, 2009–10

Keystone Cup western Canada championship

- Bronze medal: 2011–12

== Honoured members ==
The number 22 was retired for Elias Lachance at the start of the 2011–12 season. Lachance, who played for the Wolverines during its 2008–09 and 2009–10 seasons, died in a car accident in 2011.

== See also ==
- List of ice hockey teams in Alberta
