= HHS =

HHS or HHs commonly refers to:

- United States Department of Health and Human Services, a cabinet-level executive branch department of the U.S. federal government

HHS or HHs may also refer to:

== Health and medicine ==
- Hamilton Health Sciences, Canada
- Hyperosmolar hyperglycemic state, a medical condition
- Hoyeraal–Hreidarsson syndrome, a medical condition

== Schools ==
- Hastings High School (disambiguation)
- Hamilton High School (disambiguation)
- Heritage High School (disambiguation)
- Highland High School (disambiguation)
- Hillsboro High School (disambiguation)
- Huntsville High School (disambiguation)
- Holland High School (disambiguation)

=== Canada ===
- Halton High School, Ontario
- Hilltop High School (Whitecourt), Alberta

=== United Kingdom ===
- Hereward House School, England
- Heartlands High School, London, England
- Hadleigh High School, England

=== United States ===
- Hall High School (Connecticut)
- Hall High School (Illinois)
- Hampshire High School (Illinois)
- Hampshire High School (West Virginia)
- Hanover High School (New Hampshire)
- Hardaway High School, Georgia
- Hardee High School, Florida
- Hardin High School (disambiguation)
  - Hardin High School (Montana)
  - Hardin High School (Texas)
- Harlingen High School, Texas
- Harmony High School, Florida
- Harrisburg High School (Arkansas)
- Harrisburg High School (Oregon)
- Harrison High School (Arkansas)
- Harrison High School (New Jersey)
- Harrison High School (New York)
- Harrisonburg High School (Virginia)
- Harriton High School (Pennsylvania)
- Hartsville High School, South Carolina
- Harvard High School (Illinois)
- Havana High School, Illinois
- Haverford High School, Pennsylvania
- Haverhill High School, Massachusetts
- Havre De Grace High School, Maryland
- Hayward High School (Wisconsin)
- Healdsburg High School, California
- Helena High School (Alabama)
- Hempfield High School, Pennsylvania
- Hempstead High School (Dubuque, Iowa)
- Henderson High School (Pennsylvania)
- Hendersonville High School (Tennessee)
- Hereford High School (Parkton, Maryland)
- Hermiston High School, Oregon
- Hernando High School (Florida)
- Herndon High School, Virginia
- Herriman High School, Utah
- Herrin High School, Illinois
- Hibriten High School, North Carolina
- Hickman High School, Missouri
- Highland High School (Pocatello, Idaho)
- Hightower High School, Texas
- Hillsborough High School (New Jersey)
- Hillsborough High School (Tampa, Florida)
- Hillside High School (Durham, North Carolina)
- Hillwood High School, Tennessee
- Hirschi High School, Texas
- Hobbs High School, New Mexico
- Holcomb High School, Kansas
- Hollister High School, California
- Holliston High School, Massachusetts
- Holly High School, Michigan
- Homestead High School (Cupertino, California)
- Homewood High School, Alabama
- Honesdale High School, Pennsylvania
- Hornbeck High School, Louisiana
- Hortonville High School, Wisconsin
- Howell High School (Howell, Michigan)
- Holyoke High School, Massachusetts
- Hubbard High School (Ohio)
- Hudson High School (Ohio)
- Hudsonville High School, Michigan
- Hughes High School, Arkansas
- Humble High School, Texas
- Hudson High School (Massachusetts)
- Hueneme High School, California
- Huffman High School, Alabama
- Huntingtown High School, Maryland
- Huron High School (Ann Arbor, Michigan)
- Hutchinson High School (Kansas)
- Hutchinson High School (Minnesota)

=== Other places ===
- Holroyd High School, Australia
- Hutchings High School, India
- The Hague University of Applied Sciences, Netherlands
- Henderson High School (Auckland), New Zealand
- Stockholm School of Economics (Swedish: Handelshögskolan i Stockholm), Sweden

== Other uses ==
- Huguenot Street Historic District, United States
- Hénon–Heiles system, a mathematical model of particle motion
- Harte Hanks, an American marketing services company (NASDAQ code: HHS)
