= Morgen Runge =

Canadian football player (born 1997)

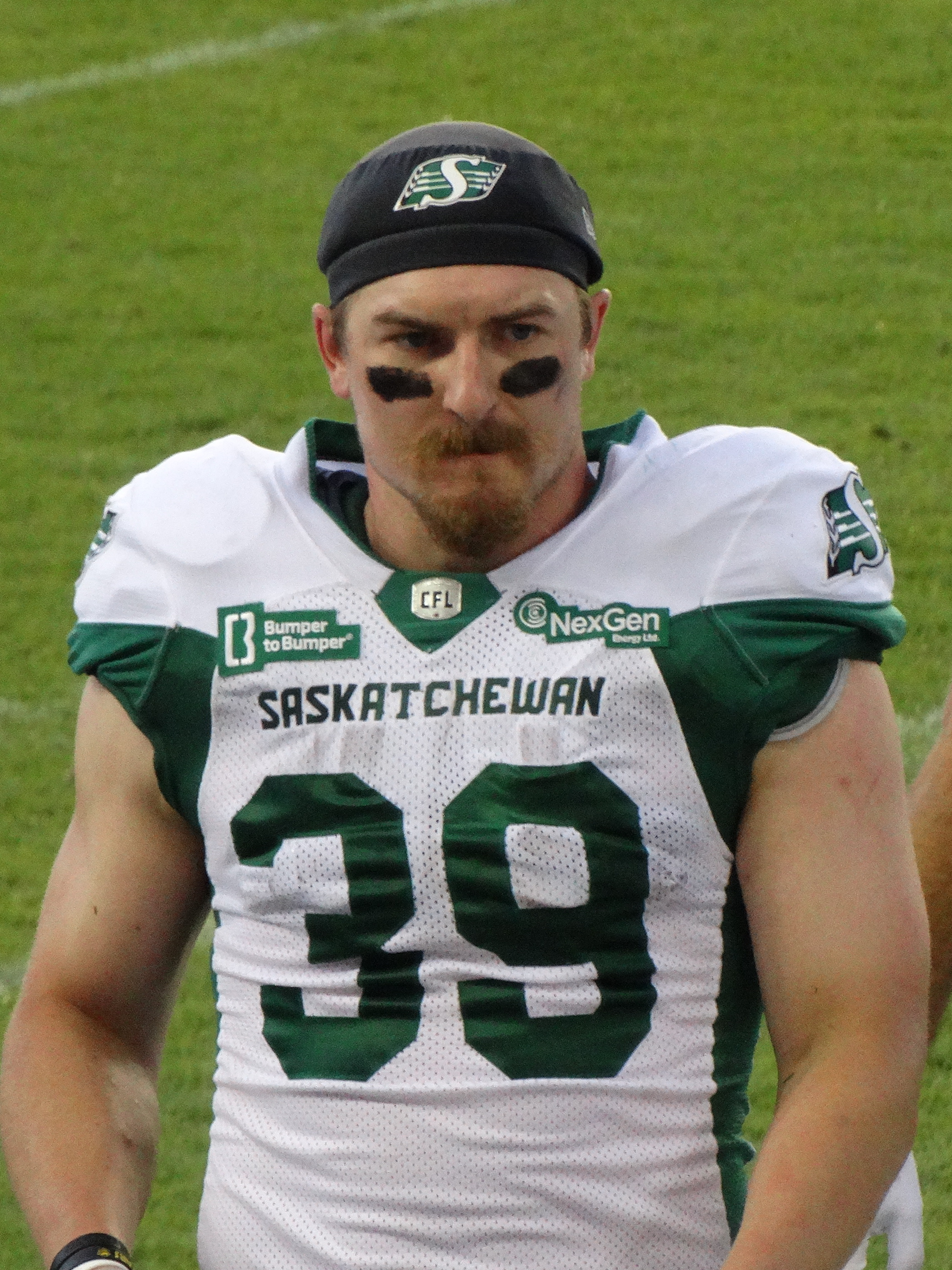
- Runge with the Saskatchewan Roughriders in 2025

No. 39 – Saskatchewan Roughriders
- Position: Fullback
- Roster status: Active
- CFL status: National

Personal information
- Born: November 24, 1997 (age 28)
- Listed height: 6 ft 0 in (1.83 m)
- Listed weight: 205 lb (93 kg)

Career information
- High school: Hilltop (Whitecourt, Alberta)
- CJFL: Edmonton Huskies
- University: Alberta (2020–2024)
- CFL draft: 2023: undrafted

Career history
- Saskatchewan Roughriders (2023)*; Saskatchewan Roughriders (2024)*; Saskatchewan Roughriders (2025–present)
- * Offseason or practice squad member only

Awards and highlights
- Grey Cup champion (2025)
- Stats at CFL.ca

Morgen Runge (born November 24, 1997) is a Canadian professional football fullback for the Saskatchewan Roughriders of the Canadian Football League (CFL). He played U Sports football at Alberta.

== Early life ==
Morgen Runge was born on November 24, 1997. He played hockey growing up. He did not play football until grade 10 at Whitecourt's Hilltop High School, where he also played hockey. Runge later played for the Edmonton Huskies of the Canadian Junior Football League from 2015 to 2019. His junior football eligibility ended after the 2019 season.

== University career ==
In 2020, Runge enrolled at the University of Alberta to play U Sports football for the Alberta Golden Bears. He majored in arts at Alberta. The 2020 season was cancelled due to the COVID-19 pandemic. He played in eight games during the 2021 season, catching six passes for 43 yards and one touchdown while also posting two solo tackles and one assisted tackle. Runge missed the 2022 season.

After going undrafted in the 2023 CFL draft, Runge signed with the Saskatchewan Roughriders on May 8, 2023. He was released before the start of the 2023 CFL season. He then returned to the University of Alberta, appearing in five games during the 2023 U Sports season while totaling one carry for two yards, two receptions for 17 yards, two solo tackles, and one assisted tackle.

Runge re-signed with the Roughriders on November 21, 2023. He was released before the start of the regular season again on June 1, 2024. He returned to Alberta for his final season of U Sports eligibility, playing in eight games while recording six catches for 54 yards and two assisted tackles.

== Professional career ==
Runge re-signed with Saskatchewan again on December 2, 2024. Due to fullback Albert Awachie having suffered a hip injury, Runge made his CFL debut in the 2025 season opener on June 5 against the Ottawa Redblacks. Runge was moved to the practice roster on July 10, 2025.
