= Project Advance =

Syracuse University program for high schoolers

Syracuse University Project Advance
- Abbreviation: SUPA
- Formation: 1972; 54 years ago
- Type: Concurrent Enrollment Program
- Location: 400 Ostrom Avenue, Syracuse, New York 13210
- Coordinates: 43.0426°N 76.128746°W
- Region served: Northeast United States
- Official language: English
- Parent organization: Syracuse University
- Affiliations: National Alliance of Concurrent Enrollment Partnerships (NACEP)
- Website: supa.syr.edu

Syracuse University Project Advance (SUPA) is a Concurrent Enrollment Program (CEP) that allows high school students to take authorized Syracuse University courses for college credit at their own schools. Formed in 1972 to address "senioritis" and provide a more challenging curriculum, SUPA currently serves over 200 high schools across the Northeast United States. The courses are taught by high school faculty who hold SU adjunct instructor appointments and adhere to university standards. SUPA is accredited by the National Alliance of Concurrent Enrollment Partnerships (NACEP).

== History ==
In 1972, six Central New York high school administrators approached Syracuse University about establishing a college readiness program to challenge high school seniors.

The administrators hoped to address growing concerns about “senioritis”—the tendency of college-bound seniors to not take their final year seriously because of a lack of incentive. Having completed their graduation requirements early, these students would use their senior year to relax and socialize rather than readying themselves for the transition from high school to college-level work.

=== A working model ===
To solve the problem presented by the school superintendents, SU administrators explored ways in which carefully designed and controlled “concurrent enrollment” (sometimes called “dual enrollment”) courses could be taught for credit within the high school as part of the regular academic program. A committee of deans, academic chairmen, and faculty discussed multiple solutions before proposing a college readiness program that would be self-sufficient and capable of implementation and expansion without creating a financial burden for the university or an instructional overload for cooperating faculty.

The model was designed to best utilize existing resources—the college courses would be taught by trained high school teachers as part of their regular teaching load. This would ensure that the courses could be taught during the regular school day, so as not to negatively impact students’ schedules.

=== New standards ===
Early in the design process, three major factors became apparent:

- First, that while an effort would be made to utilize individual high school resources, individual concurrent enrollment courses would—based on their content and structure—involve different formats and require new relationships between SU faculty, high school faculty, and students;
- Second, the success of the project would depend on the quality of the concurrent enrollment courses themselves;
- Third, the courses taught in the high schools would not only have the same instructional goals as their counterparts on campus, but they would have identical criteria for awarding grades.

==== Teaching the teachers ====
The high school-university partnership was formalized as SU Project Advance (SUPA) and launched its first dual enrollment course, English 101, in the fall semester of 1972-73. Following a detailed evaluation and development process, four additional courses were selected for possible inclusion in SUPA. These included introductory psychology, study of religion (human values), mass communications, and perspectives on drugs.

In preparation for the initial introduction of concurrent enrollment courses in the high schools, summer training sessions were held in each of the five content areas to prepare high school teachers to teach the college-level courses. These training sessions were taught by university professors and were designed to familiarize the high school teachers with the rationale and content of the new courses, the instructional techniques, and the individualized materials, as well as offer them opportunities to explore methods of adapting them to high school use if changes seemed necessary.

==== Taking it to the schools ====
Field-tested in the 1973-74 academic year in nine schools, the project expanded in 1974-75 to more than 40 schools and 180 teachers from Long Island to Buffalo, with an enrollment of more than 2,000 students. As more educators, students, and parents realized the value of college readiness and of taking actual college courses before leaving high school, the program grew.

Today, SUPA serves more than 200 high schools in New York, New Jersey, Maine, Massachusetts, Michigan, and Rhode Island, with the largest concentration in New York State. Approximately 9,000 students enroll annually in SU courses, taught by more than 878 high school faculty members with SU adjunct instructor appointments. Teachers continue to attend professional development training sessions at the annual SUPA Summer Institute as more and more high schools expand their academic offerings. The course selection has also grown to include more than 30 courses from 24 academic disciplines.

==== Modeling success ====
SUPA is the only program affiliated with a private research university in the Northeast to be accredited by the National Alliance of Concurrent Enrollment Partnerships (NACEP). SUPA is also a founding member of NACEP, which serves as a national accrediting body and supports all members by providing standards of excellence, research, communication, and advocacy.

== Timeline ==
- 1972: Six local high schools approach Syracuse University about devising a program to offer college courses to qualified high school seniors.
- 1973: SU Project Advance is field-tested in nine schools.
- 1974: SU Project Advance officially launches, offering SU courses in more than 40 high schools.
- 1984: The American Association of Higher Education recognizes SU Project Advance for notable achievements in education.
- 2002: New York State Assembly passes a resolution recognizing SU Project Advance for "...the significance of its contributions to the quality and diversity of educational opportunities in the State of New York."
- 2003: SU Project Advance becomes one of a select few private four-year universities accredited by the National Alliance of Concurrent Enrollment Partnerships (NACEP).
- 2010: A 35-year retrospective of SUPA’s research, Our Courses Your Classroom: Research on Syracuse University Courses Taught in High School is published.

== Courses ==
Courses offered:

- Accounting
- American History
- Biology
- Calculus
- Chemistry
- College Learning Strategies
- Computer Engineering
- Cybersecurity
- Earth System Science
- Economics
- English/Writing
- Forensic Science
- French
- Information Technology
- Italian
- Latin
- Personal Finance
- Physics
- Presentational Speaking
- Psychology
- Public Affairs
- Spanish
- Sociology
- Statistics
- Website Design
