= Senior (education) =

Student in the fourth year of study

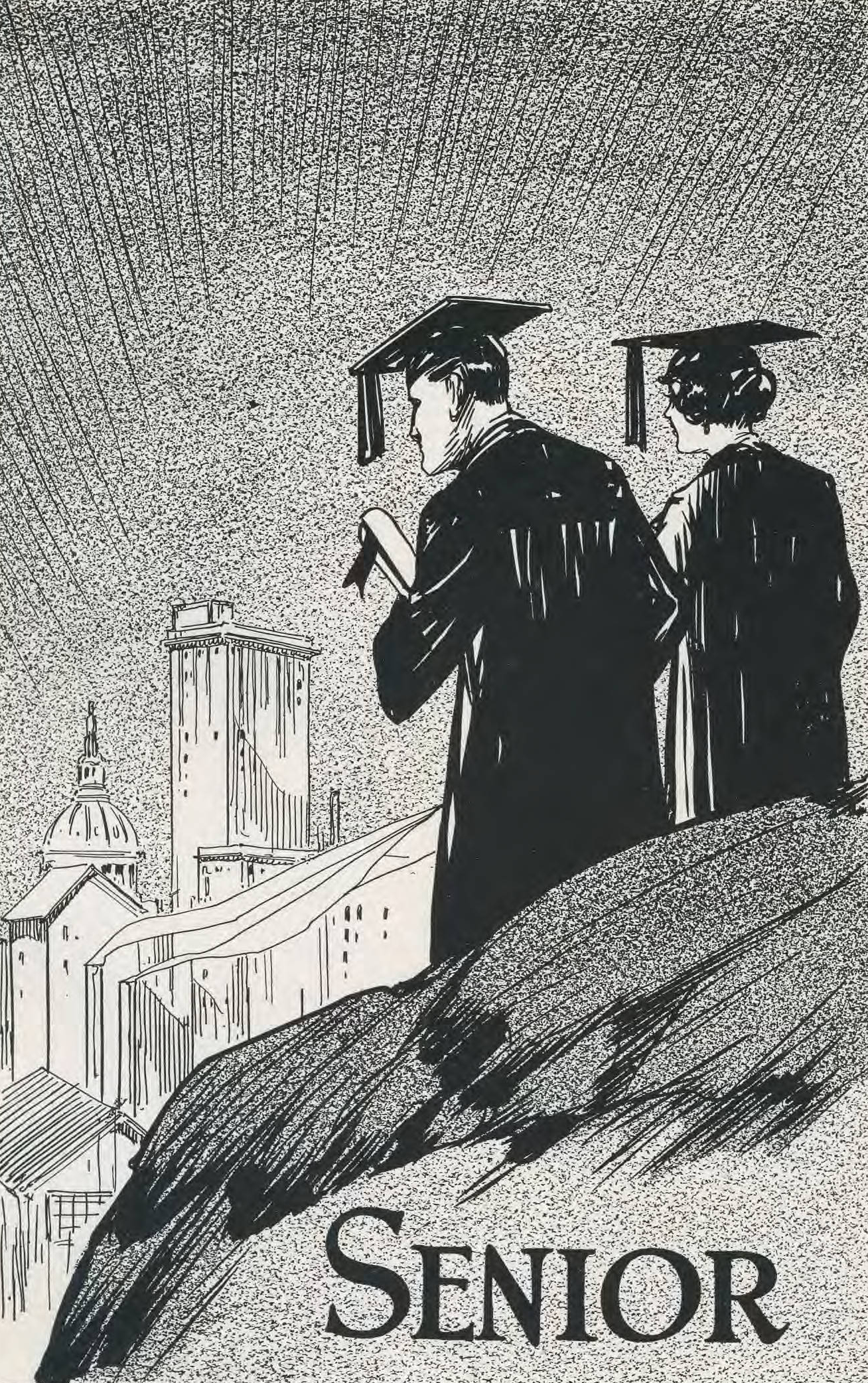
Senior class artwork, from East Texas State Normal College's 1920 Locust yearbook

The term senior, in regard to education, has different meanings depending on the country.

== United States ==
In the United States education, a senior is a student in the fourth year of study, either in high school or college/university.

=== High school ===
The twelfth grade is the fourth and final year of a student's high school education. The year and the student are both referred to as senior. Senior year is when most students take college entrance exams (ACT or SAT) and actually apply to college/university. A common stereotype of high school seniors in the United States is that they suffer from "senioritis", a perceived laziness or lack of motivation to complete schoolwork in this year. This is due to the assumption that colleges and universities place greater emphasis on a student's performance during junior year when making admission decisions, and that poor academic performance during senior year will not matter because the senior will already have been admitted to college at the time of graduation.

Alternatively, senior year is when students decide to pursue a trade and enroll in a relevant school or program rather than attending college/university. Some seniors decide to put off higher education in favor of entering the work force.

=== Higher education ===
The fourth year of an undergraduate program is known as senior year, and 4th-year students are known as seniors. Bachelor's degree programs are designed to be completed in four years, so the senior year is usually the final year of the program. Seniors are encouraged to take professional licensure exams, begin the process of job-hunting, or apply to graduate school in their senior year. Many colleges and universities might also require capstone projects or the completion of special seminars that require the student to demonstrate everything they have learned in their major or time at university in general.

=== Super Senior ===
The term super senior is used in the United States to refer to a student who has not completed graduation requirements by the end of the fourth year, who is continuing to attempt to complete said requirements. The term refers primarily to college students taking additional courses, rather than high school students who would most likely be required to repeat courses. Although super seniors are stereotyped as students who were unable to complete their graduation requirements due to some personal failing or unforeseen circumstances, many super seniors take an additional year intentionally to take additional courses or acquire additional credentials. Super seniors are also sometimes called "fifth-year seniors" in some contexts, especially in relation to student athletes.

== Canada ==
In the province of Ontario, high school students in their third year and above are considered to be seniors, while in the province of Alberta, only twelfth graders are counted as seniors even though both provinces are Canadian.

== Nigeria ==
In Nigeria, senior secondary education is the education children receive after primary and junior secondary education and before the tertiary period. The appropriate age for senior secondary education in Nigeria is 11–18 years. The student is expected to write (West African Examination Council — WAEC) examination and/or National Examination Council (NECO) at the completion of six years of study. Every student is examined on 8–9 subjects. All students complete 4 core cross-cutting subjects: English language, General Mathematics, Civic Education and Trade/Entrepreneurship.

== See also ==
- Freshman
- Sophomore
- Junior
- Intercollegiate athletics
- Senioritis
