= Whitecourt Mountain =

Mountain in Alberta, Canada

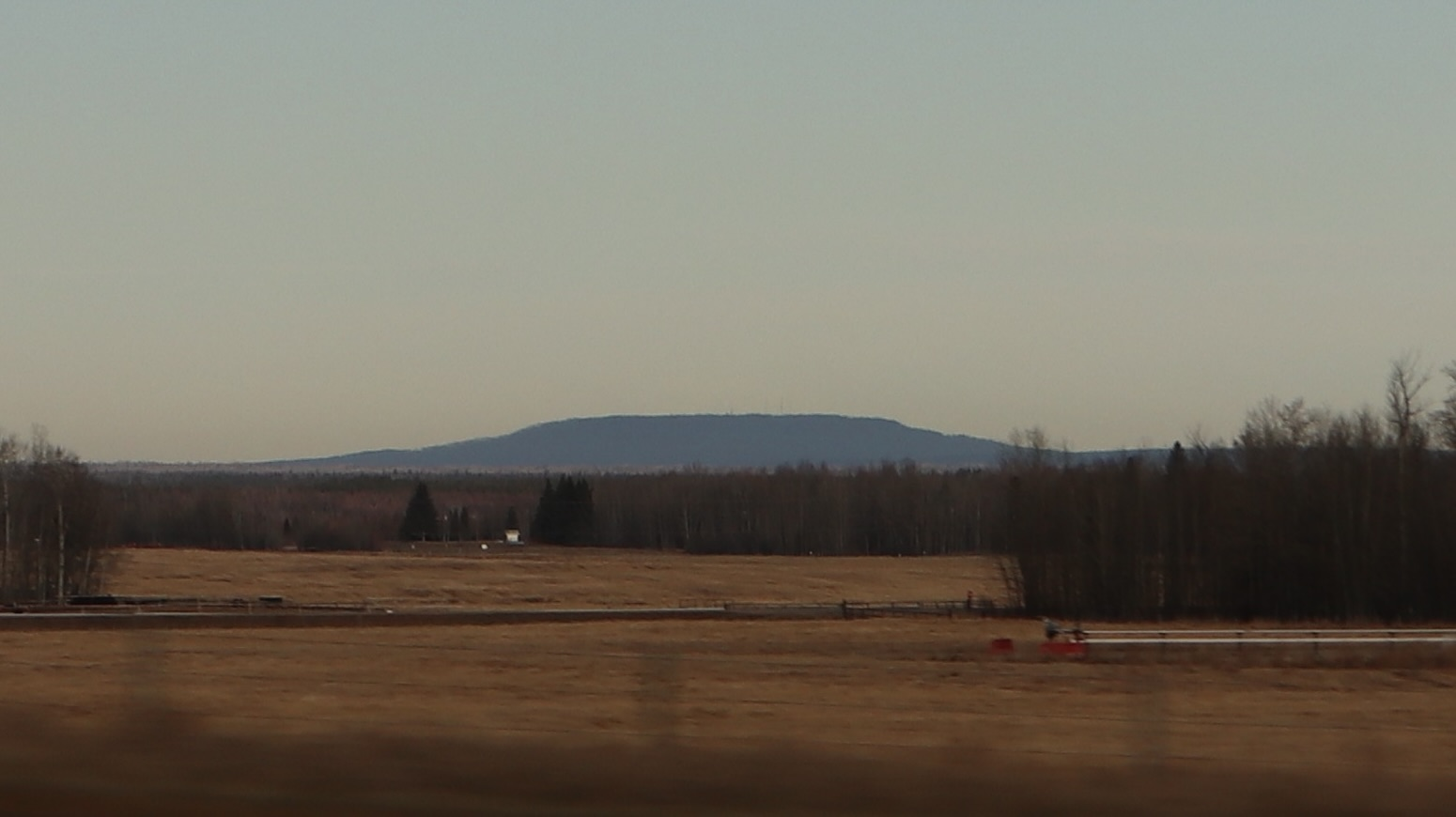
- Whitecourt Mountain seen from Highway 16

Highest point
- Elevation: 1,164 m (3,819 ft)
- Prominence: 333 m (1,093 ft)
- Listing: Mountains of Alberta
- Coordinates: 54°1′56″N 115°42′51″W

Geography
- Location within Alberta
- Country: Canada
- Province: Alberta

Whitecourt Mountain is a mountain in Woodlands County, Alberta that is immediately south of the town of Whitecourt. It is 1,164 metres (3,819 ft) tall and is the most prominent peak in the immediate area, making it a popular destination for outdoor activity. It is known for the Whitecourt crater, a meteor impact site that is notable for its preservation, despite being relatively young and small.

At 333 m (1,093 ft) of prominence, it stands out from the surrounding foothills, and is visible from Highway 16 (Yellowhead Trail), in particular along the McLeod River. It also decorates the background scenery as seen from Whitecourt and can be seen from many kilometers away.

The mountain, particularly its peak, is partially encompassed by Whitecourt Mountain Natural Area, a local park that is known for its stunning vistas of the surrounding landscape. It serves as a tourist destination and a notable area for citizens of Whitecourt.
