= Holland Patent High School =

Coordinates: 43.253361°N 75.254163°W

- 8079 Thompson Road; Holland Patent, New York; United States

Information
- Type: Public
- Motto: Committed to Excellence
- School district: Holland Patent Central School District
- Principal: Aidyn Mosher
- Teaching staff: 39.58 (FTE)
- Grades: 9 to 12
- Enrollment: 405 (2023-2024)
- Student to teacher ratio: 10.23
- Colors: Purple and gold
- Athletics conference: Center State Conference
- Mascot: The Golden Knight
- Nickname: Harvard on the Hill
- Team name: Golden Knights
- Website: Web Site

Holland Patent High School is a U.S. high school located in Holland Patent, New York, a village in Oneida County, central New York State, about 12 miles (19 km) northwest of Utica and 10 miles (16 km) east of Rome. The area served by the school is primarily a residential bedroom community for several small-to medium-sized cities, including Utica, Rome, and Syracuse.

460 students were enrolled in the school as of the 2018–19 school year, with the senior class having 121 members. The average class size is 23. The current principal is Aidyn Mosher As of October 2018, there were 41 teaching staff.

== Academics ==
Seven advanced placement courses (Biology, Calculus, English Language and Composition, Government, Music Theory, US History, World History) and are offered in addition to the usual high school curriculum. Holland Patent offers an array of dual-credit classes with Mohawk Valley Community College and two writing courses with Syracuse University Project Advance. The school has an average SAT score of 1094, and an average ACT score of 24. The SAT score is in the 68th percentile, nationally, while the school's ACT composite score is in the 74th percentile, nationally. 72% of the Class of 2018 went on to continue their education. 38% went on to 4-year colleges, 30% went on to 2-year colleges, 2% went on to trade schools, and 2% joined the military.

== Sports ==
In addition to excellence in the classroom, Holland Patent has a particularly successful sports program. The athletics program at Holland Patent offers 14 boys' sports and 13 girls' sports. The fall 2018 season brought particular success to the Golden Knights. Holland Patent Football captured their first sectional title in 29 years, in addition to their first league title since 1997. Holland Patent Girls' Soccer won their first sectional title, and advanced to the championship match in the NYSPHSAA state tournament, ousting state ranked No. 2 Academy of the Holy Names in a raucous game that resulted in several yellow cards being handed to both teams, a red card to a player from the Academy of the Holy Names, and one parent ejection for screaming obscenities at a ref. The Holland Patent Field Hockey Team (HOPAFIHO) defended their 2017 sectional title. The Holland Patent Lady Aqua Knights (Girls' swim and dive), under the leadership of coach Mark Celecki, finished 2nd at sectionals and sent a slew of teammates to state qualifiers. The boys tennis team proved to be strong in the spring season with an easy victory over undefeated Cooperstown (69-0).

In addition to sports, the school offers a co-ed cheer squad for the fall/winter seasons and many arts programs, including music and drama studies.
