= Cortona Academy =

Coordinates: 38°57′9″N 77°24′47″W

- Herndon, Virginia; United States

Information
- Type: Private
- Established: 1992
- Head teacher: Sharon Peruzzi Strauchs
- Grades: 7 through 12
- Average class size: 3-5 students
- Student to teacher ratio: 4:1
- Campus: Suburban/Virtual
- Colors: Blue & Gold
- Athletics: 3 interscholastic
- Website: Official website

Cortona Academy, founded in 1992, is a private, co-educational, college preparatory academy in Herndon, Virginia, serving grades 7–12. It serves students from the greater Washington area. The campus is situated in Herndon and 100% of Cortona seniors are accepted to college.

== Philosophy ==
Cortona Academy's teaching and learning philosophies are derived mainly from Oxford's theory whereby students naturally reach their own level of potential if given the opportunity to work with mentors and professionals in their subject areas in one-on-one classes or in small groups. The teaching style is Socratic, based around essential questions and critical thinking, with a focus on student-centered learning along with an average 4:1 student-teacher ratio.

== History ==
Cortona Academy was founded in 1992 by Sharon Peruzzi Strauchs, a native of Pittsburgh, PA. Strauchs, a graduate of Carnegie-Mellon University, has been the Principal of Cortona Academy since its inception, and is the Lead Teacher. The academy opened in Herndon, VA with 18 students. In 2010 Cortona Academy moved into its current location, a six-acre campus located in Herndon. There are two academic buildings and a science center. Since 2007, students have earned an average of $40k to $110k in merit-based college scholarships.

== Campus ==
Cortona Academy is a college preparatory academy located in an environmentally protected area for endangered species. The campus consists of a 14,000 sqft building that holds the administrative office, classrooms, and a multi-use room, which also houses Cortona's hi-tech project lab.

== Academics ==
Cortona Academy accepts rolling admissions which allows students to enter any time during the academic year. There are graduation credit requirements and a course catalog. Dual enrollment at local colleges and universities is available, that allows students to simultaneously register at other colleges. Accreditation is through the North Central Association of Colleges and Schools.

== Courses ==
Cortona Academy has a variety of topic-based classes which include general science, biology, chemistry, physics, humanities, electives, and mathematics through college-level calculus, along with college-level humanities courses. It is accredited for twenty-two languages. It follows HTS-3, a proprietary study and organizational skills system, which is utilized in all classes to prepare students for college and to promote lifelong success.

Cortona's Homework Lab and on-site tutors are offered to every student, both during the school day, and after school. SAT, PSAT, and ACT prep courses are offered to at no cost Cortona Academy students. Students can earn transferable college credit while in high school. Students may dual register at local colleges and universities. Cortona Academy can create individualized schedules to accommodate these off-site courses or other extracurricular activities.

=== Summer Program ===
The Summer Programs range from Ivy League summer accredited courses for Gifted Students to Activity- based camps, which include digital arts, drama, visual arts, and physics, STEM, and arts for grades 4 - 9.

=== Special Program ===
Cortona Academy offers special programs for the attention deficit hyperactivity disorder (ADHD), gifted students, dyslexic students and/or other learning challenged students. The programs are available on-site using Cortona's HTS-3 Speed Study System that builds focus and improves academics and processing, shortening homework time.

=== Extracurricular activities ===
Cortona Academy students utilize an Astroturf venue for playing soccer, basketball, baseball, and tennis. Cortona Academy also participates in the football and basketball competitions in Northern Virginia with other private schools. One of the notable projects of Cortona students includes an underwater robot to help protect the coral reefs.
