= National Alliance of Concurrent Enrollment Partnerships =

The National Alliance of Concurrent Enrollment Partnerships (NACEP) is a professional organization for college and high school partnerships offering college courses in American high schools.

NACEP was established in 1999 in response to the dramatic increase in concurrent enrollment courses throughout the country. NACEP serves as a national accrediting body for these programs

NACEP provides standards of excellence, networking, best practices, and information about national trends in dual and concurrent enrollment. NACEP bylaws were first adopted in 2002.

== Standards for Accreditation ==
NACEP has set 16 concurrent enrollment standards and 13 college-provided faculty model standards in six categories: Partnerships, Curriculum, Faculty, Students, Assessment, and Program Evaluation.

== NACEP Standards as a Model for Quality Control ==
NACEP standards have been recognized as a model for states that want to institute quality controls for dual enrollment programs, and NACEP's accreditation process has been acknowledged for its rigor. Several states have either referenced NACEP in dual enrollment policies or laws, or have developed standards based on NACEP standards. These include:

=== Arkansas ===
The Arkansas concurrent enrollment policy states

“If an institution of higher education offers a concurrent enrollment course(s) on a high school campus taught by a high school teacher, the institution must hold provisional membership in the National Alliance of Concurrent Enrollment Partnerships (NACEP) by January 31, 2008. Institutions that have offered concurrent enrollment courses on high school campuses taught by high school teachers for at least five years must become accredited members of NACEP by July 1, 2009. Those that have offered concurrent enrollment courses taught by high school instructors for less than five years must become accredited members as soon after July 1, 2009 as the five-year criteria is met. If NACEP broadens its scope of accreditation, institutions that fall within that scope will be required to hold provisional membership and gain accreditation.”

=== Florida ===
Florida's February 2007 Statement of Standards is based on the NACEP Statement of Standards. Enacted by the Council of Presidents and sponsored by the State Board of Education, the SoS has yet to be implemented due to a lack of interest and political commitment. No postsecondary school in Florida is yet a member of NACEP.

=== Idaho ===
Idaho's state standards for concurrent enrollment programs is based on the NACEP Statement of Standards.

=== Illinois ===
The Illinois Dual Credit Task Force Report to the Illinois General Assembly recommends

“requiring all institutions offering dual credit programs to comply with added criteria adapted from those used by the National Alliance for Concurrent Enrollment Partnerships (NACEP) for accrediting dual credit programs”.

=== Indiana ===
Indiana code states that

“all postsecondary institutions and campuses offering dual credit courses in liberal arts, professional, or career/technical disciplines shall achieve accreditation by the National Alliance of Concurrent Enrollment Partnerships no later than fall 2008”.

=== Iowa ===
The Iowa Senior Year Plus Course Auditing Committee is mandated by Iowa Code 256.17 to annually audit postsecondary courses offered to high school students in accordance with Iowa Code 261E. The committee adopted the NACEP standards and is linking the 2009-10 audit process with the accreditation process.

=== Minnesota ===
Minnesota statute states

“Beginning in fiscal year 2011, districts only are eligible for aid if the college or university concurrent enrollment courses offered by the district are accredited by the National Alliance of Concurrent Enrollment Partnerships, in the process of being accredited, or are shown by clear evidence to be of comparable standard to accredited courses.”

=== Oregon ===
Oregon public universities' proposed standards for College Now programs “closely align with, and are heavily indebted to, the National Alliance of Concurrent Enrollment Partnerships standards”.

== NACEP Accreditation ==
There are no restrictions on membership in NACEP; however only programs meeting the NACEP definition of concurrent enrollment may apply for accreditation. NACEP defines concurrent enrollment in the Overview of the NACEP Statement of Standards.

"Through Concurrent Enrollment Partnerships [CEP's], qualified students can earn college credit prior to high school graduation. CEPs differ from other pre-college credit programs because high school instructors teach the college courses during the normal school day. Such programs provide a direct connection between secondary and post-secondary institutions and an opportunity for collegial collaboration. Although courses in some CEPs may have some elements or characteristics of the programs stated below, CEPs are distinct programs from the following:

- Programs in which the high school student travels to the college campus to take courses prior to graduation during the academic year or during the summer.
- Programs where college faculty travel to the high school to teach courses to the high school students.
- The College Board Advanced Placement Program and the International Baccalaureate Program where standardized tests are used to assess students’ knowledge of a curriculum developed by a committee consisting of both college and high school faculty."

Concurrent enrollment is sometimes considered a subset of dual enrollment, and can be seen as a solution to the perceived quality problems associated with dual enrollment. Other terms that encompass concurrent enrollment are dual credit, college in the high schools, Postsecondary Enrollment Options (PSEO), pre-college programs or accelerated learning.

As of May 2009, 36 concurrent enrollment programs sponsored by colleges and universities in 13 states had been accredited through NACEP. Accredited programs can be searched by state on the NACEP website.
