= Hardin High School =

Hardin High School may refer:

- Central Hardin High School in Elizabethtown, Kentucky
- John Hardin High School, in Radcliff, Kentucky
- Hardin High School (Illinois), a defunct school in Hardin, Illinois
- Hardin High School (Montana), in Hardin, Montana
- Hardin High School (Texas), in Hardin, Liberty County, Texas
- North Hardin High School in Radcliff, Kentucky
- R. F. Hardin High School, in Brownwood, Texas
- South Hardin High School in Eldora, Iowa
- West Hardin High School in Saratoga, Texas

== See also ==
- Harding High School (disambiguation)
- Hardin-Jefferson High School, in Hardin County, Texas; see Hardin-Jefferson Independent School District
