= Mohawk Valley Community College =

Community college in Oneida County, New York, U.S.

- Former names: New York State Institute of Applied Arts and Sciences at Utica, Mohawk Valley Technical Institute
- Type: Public community college
- Established: 1946; 80 years ago
- Parent institution: State University of New York
- President: Randall J. VanWagoner
- Undergraduates: 6,095 (fall 2025)
- Location: Utica, New York, United States; 43°04′39″N 75°13′03″W
- Campus: Suburban 90 acres (0.36 km^{2})
- Colors: Sea green and gray
- Nickname: Hawks
- Sporting affiliations: National Junior College Athletic Association, Region III, Mid-State Athletic Conference
- Mascot: Mo Hawk
- Website: www.mvcc.edu

Mohawk Valley Community College (MVCC) is a public community college in Oneida County, New York. It is part of the State University of New York system. MVCC was founded in 1946 as the first community college established in New York State and currently consists of the main campus in Utica and a branch campus in Rome.

== Academics ==
MVCC enrollment grew 25 percent from 2009 to 2012 and 2014 enrollment is 5,277 FTEs (full-time equivalent students). The average age of the students is 25.6 and 76 percent live in Oneida County. Twenty-one percent are minority students.

MVCC enrollment fell 22 percent from 2011 to 2015, and 2015–16 enrollment was 4,800 FTEs (full-time equivalent students). The average age for all students is 21.9, and the average age for full-time matriculated students is 22.7. Male students account for 49 percent of the population, and female students are at 51 percent. Twenty percent are minority students.

The school is served by approximately 132 full-time and 194 part-time faculty members. The full-time staff totals 160, with an additional 173 part-time staff. The student to faculty ratio is 20:1.

Mohawk Valley Community College has been designated by the NSA and the Department of Homeland Security as the Regional Resource Center for the Northeast region of the United States.

=== Accreditation ===
MVCC is accredited by the Middle States Commission on Higher Education . MVCC also has a variety of programs that are accredited individually, including:

- Civil, Mechanical, and Electrical Engineering Technology and Surveying Technology curricula: Engineering Technology Accreditation Commission of ABET
- Nursing: Accreditation Commission for Education in Nursing, Inc. (ACEN)
- Health Information Technology: Commission on Accreditation for Health Informatics and Information Management Education
- Radiological Technology: Joint Review Committee of Education in Radiological Technology
- Respiratory Care: Committee on Accreditation for Respiratory Care
- Surgical Technician: Accrediting Bureau of Health Education Schools
- Dual Credit: National Alliance of Concurrent Enrollment Partnerships

=== International students ===
MVCC receives exchange and international students from 30 countries as of 2024, including Japan, Canada, Vietnam, South Korea, Brazil, and China. The International Student Services Office assists them by providing an international student orientation, a mentor program, cultural workshops, trips, and events.

=== Phi Theta Kappa ===
Phi Theta Kappa is the official international honor society for two-year colleges. MVCC's chapter is Lambda Beta, and has more than 225 members. Eligibility requirements include a 3.5 GPA, the completion of at least 12 credits that count toward a degree, current MVCC enrollment, and adhesion to the moral standards of the society. MVCC's chapter participates in numerous service projects throughout the year with members donating hundreds of hours to the college and the local community.

=== Alumni ===
MVCC has more than 47,000 alumni, and approximately 20,000 of them reside in Central New York.

== Student life ==
=== Residence life ===
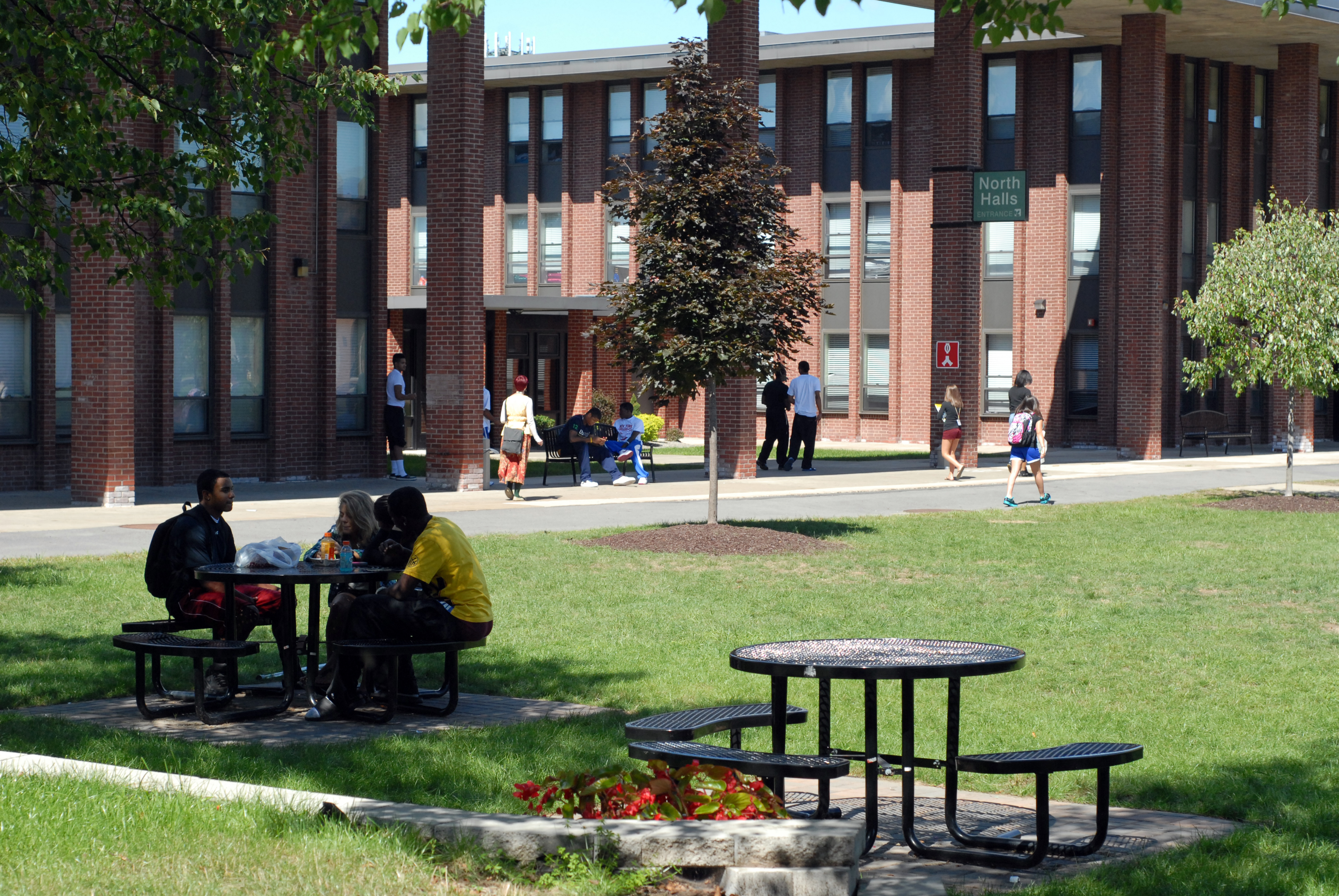
MVCC Utica Campus; Residence Halls; North Halls

MVCC Residence Hall Interior

MVCC has five residence halls – Daugherty, Huntington, Penfield, Butterfield, and Bellamy — that together house approximately 500 students. Each hall houses a professional, live-in staff member; a mix of single-, double-, and triple-occupancy rooms; study areas open 24/7.

=== Dining ===
All residential students must have a dining plan through MVCC's provider, American Dining Creations. There is a main dining hall, the Hawk's Nest, and the Snack Bar for grab-and-go options.

=== Student activities ===
MVCC's co-curricular program is student-directed and oriented. Students decide on the kinds of clubs, organizations, activities, and special events that happen at MVCC, providing opportunities for intellectual and individual growth; experience in planning events, activities, and programs; fiscal responsibility; and group leadership.

=== Clubs and organizations ===
At MVCC, there are many clubs and organizations for students to participate in. Some groups are related to academic majors, others to individual interests, religious societies, and honor societies. All offer students "hands-on" opportunities and, combined with classroom learning, create a well-rounded college experience for those who chose to participate. There are more than 50 on-campus clubs and organizations, including Student Congress, Catalyst for Chirst Christian Club, Criminal Justice Club, Drama Club, International Club, Latino and Black student unions, Psychology Club, Returning Adult Student Association, Strategic Gaming Club, Anime Club (Anime Haven), Student Nurses Organization, and Welders Among the Community.

=== Events and guest services ===
The Office of Events and Guest Services at MVCC is split into four key categories, which include the MVCC Box Office (ticketing), MVCC Cultural Series (the college's bi-annual events and entertainment series), Facility Use (facilities rental, conferencing, and event coordination), and Graduation (Spring and Fall Commencement Ceremonies). Events and Guest Services continues to serve as one of the primary links between the community and the college, bringing more than 50,000 guests to the Rome and Utica campuses each year.

More than 60 different off-campus facility users/community organizations use the college's facilities each year, most of which use multiple dates throughout the year, with an approximate attendance of more than 40,000 people.

MVCC's Anime Club hosts an anime convention annually.

== Athletics ==
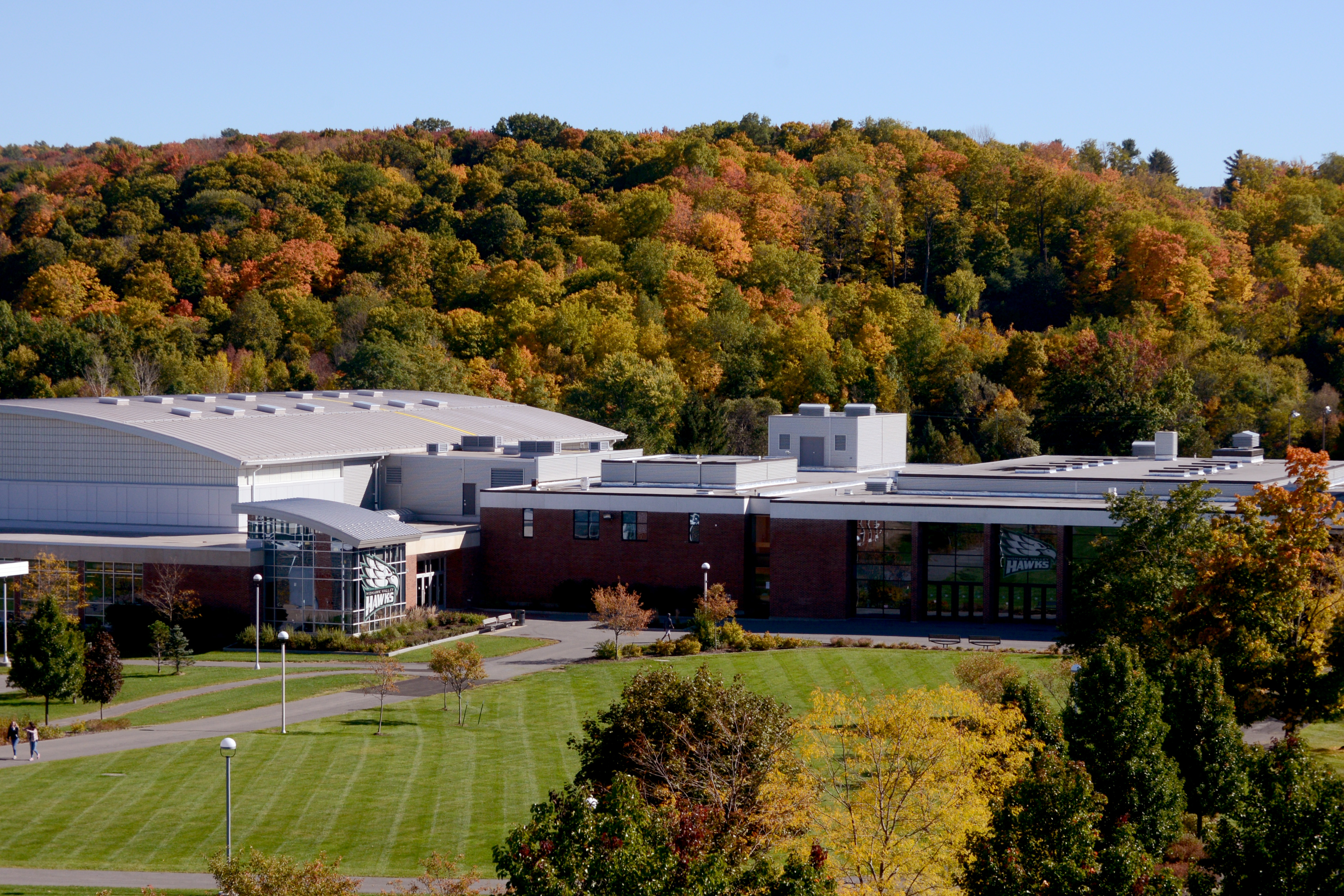
MVCC's Robert R. Jorgensen Athletic and Events Center

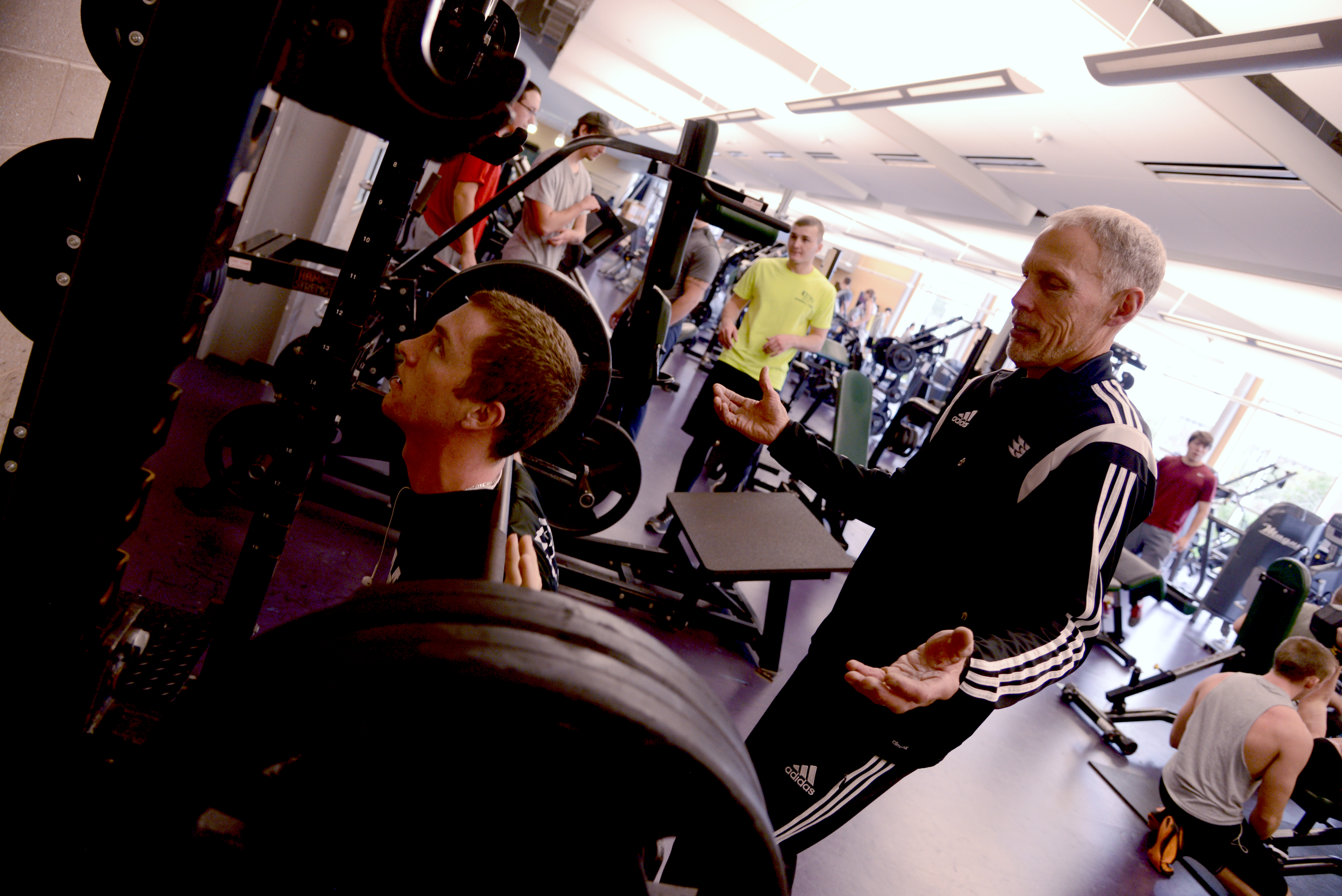
MVCC Utica Campus; Fitness Center

MVCC offers individual and team sports for men and women. Men's sports include baseball, basketball, bowling, cross country, golf, lacrosse, soccer, tennis, and track and field. Women's sports include basketball, bowling, cross country, golf, lacrosse, softball, soccer, tennis, track and field, and volleyball.

MVCC's athletic teams, known as the "Hawks," are members of the National Junior College Athletic Association (NJCAA). As part of the NJCAA, the Hawks compete in Region III and the Mountain Valley Collegiate Conference. The program is administered under the guidelines of a Division III, non-scholarship institution.

Most MVCC coaches are full-time members of the Athletic, Physical Education & Recreation Department.
