= Holland High School =

Holland High School may refer to:

- Holland High School (Michigan) in Holland, Michigan
- Holland Junior/Senior High School in Holland, New York
- Holland High School (Texas) in Holland, Texas

== See also ==
- Holland Patent High School in Holland Patent, New York
