= CIXM-FM =

Radio station in Whitecourt, Alberta

- Whitecourt, Alberta; Canada
- Frequency: 105.3 MHz
- Branding: XM 105 FM

Programming
- Format: Country
- Affiliations: Whitecourt Wolverines

Ownership
- Owner: Jim Pattison Group

History
- First air date: September 18, 2006

Technical information
- Licensing authority: CRTC
- Class: C
- ERP: 42,300 watts (42.3 kW)
- HAAT: 377 metres (1,237 ft)
- Transmitter coordinates: 54.0331°N 115.716°W

Links
- Website: www.xm105fm.com

CIXM-FM is a Canadian radio station that broadcasts a country music format at 105.3 FM in Whitecourt, Alberta, Canada. The station was founded and formerly owned by Edward and Remi Tardif.

== History ==
CIXM was granted a license by the Canadian Radio-television and Telecommunications Commission in 2005, and signed on the air on September 18, 2006.

The station is the host broadcaster for the AJHL's Whitecourt Wolverines, airing every game on air and online.

On August 20, 2018, the Jim Pattison Group announced its intent to acquire Fabmar Communications pending CRTC approval.
