= Hadleigh High School =

Location
- High Lands Road; Hadleigh, Suffolk, IP7 5HU; England; 52°02′32″N 0°57′52″E

Information
- Type: Academy
- Department for Education URN: 136918 Tables
- Ofsted: Reports
- Headteacher: Nicola Shingleton
- Gender: Coeducational
- Age: 11 to 16
- Enrolment: 780
- Houses: Oswald, Ansell, Duncan, Morris, Toppesfield, Guthrum
- Website: http://www.hadleighhigh.net/

Hadleigh High School is situated on Highlands Road in Hadleigh, Suffolk, England. It is a secondary school with academy status, and has around 730 pupils aged 11 to 16. It has a specialism in science.

The school upheld its 'good' rating from Ofsted, following a short inspection in 2019. This has been held since Ofsted's first 'full' inspection in 2012.

== History ==
In 2023 the school was found to have potentially structurally unsound buildings due to the use of reinforced autoclaved aerated concrete as a building material.

== Awards ==
Before the school breaks up for the Easter Holidays, the school holds an awards ceremony during the End of Term Assembly, giving out many awards for outstanding achievement during the year. These awards mostly go to Year Eleven students. Awards include Academic Honours in particular subjects, the Bayliss Award for Drama, the Lady Burton Cup for Outstanding Individual Achievement and the School English Award for excellent achievement in English. Other awards are also available throughout the year, including the school's own recognition of sporting achievement in the 'colour' and 'half colour' system, where pupils may be awarded in sports in which they excel.

== Sixth form ==
The school does not have a sixth form attached to it. Because of this the large majority of students that want to pursue Further Education continue to Colchester Sixth Form College, Northgate Sixth Form, Thomas Gainsborough School, Colchester Royal Grammar School, Suffolk New College or One.
