= Whitecourt crater =

Meteorite impact crater in central Alberta, Canada

- Location within North America
- Location: Alberta, Canada; 53.9987°N 115.5957°W

Impact crater structure
- Confidence: Confirmed
- Diameter: 36 m (118 ft)
- Depth: 6 m (20 ft)
- Age: 1,080-1,130 Y
- Bolide type: Iron meteorite

Whitecourt crater is a meteorite impact crater in central Alberta, Canada, located approximately 10 km (6.2 mi) southeast of the Town of Whitecourt within Woodlands County. It is remarkable for being unusually well-preserved for a crater of small size and relatively young age.

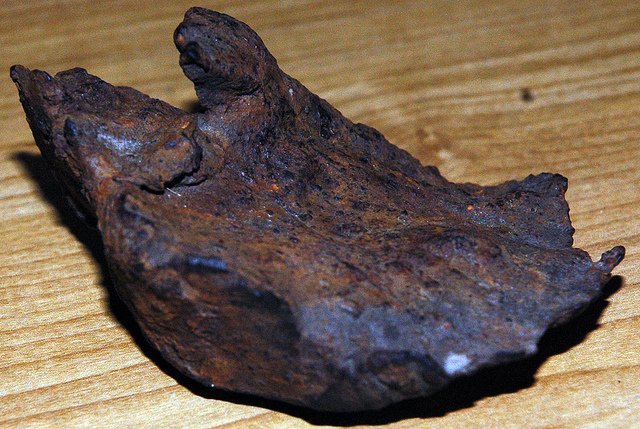
A larger 302 gram Whitecourt shrapnel meteorite showing ragged sharp edges from impact shear. The large projection is an iron crystal bent upward during fragmentation of the main body.

The crater is approximately 36 m (118 ft) in diameter and 6 m (20 ft) deep, and its age is estimated to be between 1,080 and 1,130 years since the buried fragments of the impacting meteorite are all found above a layer of carbon from a forest fire dating around 1,100 years ago.

The crater was found by Sonny Stevens, a 54-year-old resident of Whitecourt, on July 3, 2007 as he was using a metal detector while hunting in the area. The meteoritic nature of the fragments, and thus the authenticity of the crater, were confirmed by Dr. Chris Herd, professor of Earth and Atmospheric Sciences at the University of Alberta. The area has been placed within a 200-metre by 200-metre protected zone, within which collecting is prohibited and subject to a $50,000 fine or one year in jail. However, the vast majority of fragments have been found on Crown land beyond the protected area.

More than 3,000 pieces of the impacting meteorite have been found (as of 2012). The pieces are shrapnel, mostly between a few grams and 500 grams in mass, with sharp edges and mechanically deformed from the impact, but showing no sign of impact melt. Over one dozen individual (non-shrapnel pieces that show regmaglypts) meteorites have also been found with the largest weighing 31 kilograms. The meteorite fragments are irons of type IIIAB. Most fragments were ejected eastward from the crater.
