= Harding High School =

Harding High School may refer to:

- Fairport Harding High School (Fairport Harbor, Ohio)
- Harding Academy (Memphis, Tennessee)
- Harding Charter Preparatory High School (Oklahoma City, Oklahoma)
- Harding Senior High School (St. Paul, Minnesota)
- Harding University High School (Charlotte, North Carolina)
- Marion Harding High School (Marion, Ohio)
- Paul Harding High School (Fort Wayne, Indiana)
- Warren Harding High School (Bridgeport, Connecticut)
- Warren G. Harding High School (Warren, Ohio)
