= Hastings High School =

Hastings High School may refer to:

== United States ==
- Hastings High School (Florida), Hastings, Florida
- Hastings High School (Michigan), Hastings, Michigan
- Hastings High School (Minnesota), Hastings, Minnesota
- Hastings Senior High School (Nebraska), Hastings, Nebraska
- Hastings High School (New York), Hastings-on-Hudson, New York
- Alief Hastings High School, Houston, Texas

== Elsewhere ==
- Hastings High School, Coquitlam, British Columbia, Canada
- Hastings Boys' High School, Hastings, New Zealand
- Hastings Girls' High School, Hastings, New Zealand

== See also ==
- Hastings Academy, a secondary school in Hastings, England
