= Whitecourt =

- Town
- Town of Whitecourt
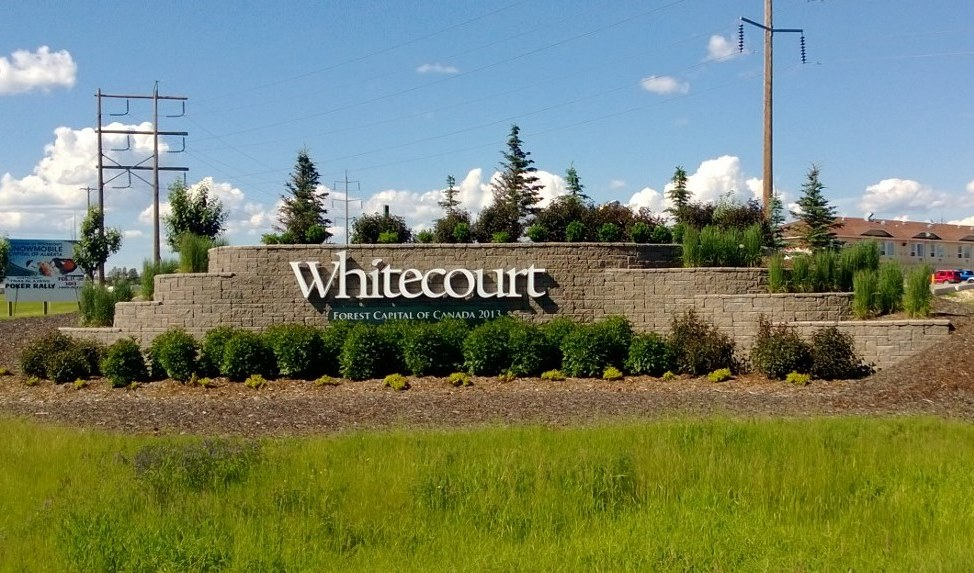
- Whitecourt's entrance sign on Highway 43

- Logo
- Nickname: Snowmobile Capital of Alberta
- Motto: Let's Go...
- Location in Woodlands County

- Location within Alberta Location within Canada Location within North America
- Coordinates: 54°08′30″N 115°41′00″W
- Country: Canada
- Province: Alberta
- Planning region: Upper Athabasca
- Municipal district: Woodlands County
- Founded: 1910
- Incorporated
  - Village: January 1, 1959
  - New town: August 15, 1961
  - Town: December 20, 1971

Government
  - Mayor: Ray Hilts
  - Governing body: Whitecourt Town Council: Tara Baker; Serena Lapointe; Brian Wynn; Bill McAree; Braden Lanctot; Mike Braun
  - CAO: Peter Smyl
  - MP: Arnold Viersen
  - MLA: Martin Long

Area (2021)
  - Land: 29.51 km^{2} (11.39 sq mi)
- Elevation: 690 m (2,260 ft)

Population (2021)
  - Total: 9,927
  - Density: 336.4/km^{2} (871/sq mi)
  - Estimate (2020): 10,234
- Time zone: UTC−06:00 (Alberta Time)
- Forward sortation area: T7S
- Area code: +1-780
- Highways: Highway 43; Highway 32
- Waterways: Athabasca River; McLeod River; Sakwatamau River; Beaver Creek
- Website: www.whitecourt.ca

Whitecourt is a town in Northern Alberta, Canada that is surrounded by Woodlands County. It is approximately 177 km (110 mi) northwest of Edmonton and 279 km (173 mi) southeast of Grande Prairie at the junction of Highway 43 and Highway 32. It has an elevation of 690 m (2,260 ft).

Whitecourt is also located at the confluence of four waterways – the Athabasca River, McLeod River, Sakwatamau River and Beaver Creek. A Canadian National rail line runs through the town.

The Town has branded itself as the Snowmobile Capital of Alberta and its motto is Let's Go.... The Whitecourt meteor impact crater is found on nearby Whitecourt Mountain.

== History ==
The community was formed in the place known by the Cree as Sagitawah (the place where the rivers meet). The first Hudson's Bay Company trading post was established at the site in 1897, and Klondike gold rush-ers used the place as a way station on the overland trek to the goldfields. The first permanent resident on the present day townsite was HBC employee and farmer John Goodwin, who settled there in 1905. A post office was established in 1910, and Walter White, who carried the mail from nearby Greencourt, was honored with the name Whitecourt. The name "Whitecourt" was chosen in 1909 by Walter White, the postmaster of the young community. White was the son-in-law of former Kansas governor John W. Leedy who also settled in the community. The name conformed to the style of the name of Green Court, White's previous hometown, located nearby.

In early 1910, MLA Peter Gunn announced that a government wagon road had been opened from Entwistle to Whitecourt. With the expansion of the Grand Trunk Pacific Railway in 1910, immigrants were encouraged by Premier Arthur Lewis Sifton to settle in the vast scarcely inhabited area between Edmonton and the Peace River Country.

With the growth of settlement in the area and as it was on the route to the Pine Pass through the Rockies, the Canadian Northern Railway line was planned to be completed to Whitecourt in 1913. But it was not until after that railway company was rolled into the Canadian National that a railway was built to Whitecourt.

== Geography ==
Whitecourt has three identifiable geographic components:

- the Valley that includes the town centre, the Athabasca Flats residential area, Millar Western's sawmill and pulp mill, and three manufactured home parks;
- the Hilltop that includes the Hilltop and Southlands Estates residential areas, the Hilltop industrial area, a 2.5 km highway commercial strip along Highway 43 and two manufactured home parks; and
- West Whitecourt, between the McLeod and Athabasca Rivers, includes an industrial area, a 1.0 km highway commercial strip along Highway 43, and a manufactured home park.

=== Climate ===
Whitecourt has a subarctic climate (Köppen Dfc), falling just short of a humid continental climate (Dfb) due to May and September having mean average temperatures just below 10 °C or 50 °F. Winters are long and cold (though milder than many areas farther east, even at lower latitudes), and summers are fairly short and relatively warm.

The record high temperature was 38.2 °C (100.8 °F) recorded June 30, 2021, with the record high daily minimum of 20.0 °C (68.0 °F) recorded the same day. The record highest dew point was 21.7 °C (71.1 °F) recorded July 17, 1979. The most humid month was August 2022 with an average dew point of 12.4 °C (54.3 °F). The warmest month was July 2007 with an average mean temperature of 20.3 °C (68.5 °F), the highest average monthly daily minimum of 12.4 °C (54.3 °F), and no daily maximum temperature below 18.3 °C (64.9 °F) for the entire month. July 2024 set the record for the highest average monthly daily maximum of 25.4 °C (77.7 °F); and no daily minimum temperature below 7.8 °C (46.0 °F). July 2004 recorded no dew point below 5.2 °C (41.4 °F) for the entire month.

The lowest yearly maximum dew point is 15.6 °C (60.1 °F) recorded in 1986. The lowest yearly maximum daily minimum temperature is 12.8 °C (55.0 °F) recorded in 1995. The lowest yearly maximum temperature is 27.7 °C (81.9 °F) recorded in 2017.

The average yearly maximum dew point is 18.4 °C (65.1 °F) and the average yearly maximum daily minimum temperature is 15.2 °C (59.4 °F).

Whitecourt

Climate chart (precipitation, max. and min. temperature)
J	F	M	A	M	J	J	A	S	O	N	D
26 −7 −16	15 −3 −13	21 2 −9	30 10 −2	61 16 4	90 20 8	104 22 10	62 21 9	38 16 4	28 9 −1	24 −1 −9	22 −6 −15
- █ Average max. and min. temperatures in °C
- █ Precipitation totals in mm
- Source: Environment Canada
Imperial conversion
J	F	M	A	M	J	J	A	S	O	N	D
1 20 3	0.6 27 8	0.8 36 16	1.2 50 29	2.4 62 38	3.5 68 46	4.1 72 50	2.4 70 48	1.5 61 40	1.1 47 29	0.9 30 16	0.9 21 6
- █ Average max. and min. temperatures in °F
- █ Precipitation totals in inches

Climate data for Whitecourt, Alberta (normals 1991-2020, extremes 1978-present)
Month	Jan	Feb	Mar	Apr	May	Jun	Jul	Aug	Sep	Oct	Nov	Dec	Year
Record high humidex	16.5	17.6	19.1	27.1	32.8	33.8	37.7	44.2	33.4	28.1	22.5	27.3	44.2
Record high °C (°F)	16.9 (62.4)	17.6 (63.7)	19.3 (66.7)	27.6 (81.7)	31.6 (88.9)	38.2 (100.8)	35.3 (95.5)	33.5 (92.3)	32.1 (89.8)	28.5 (83.3)	20.0 (68.0)	16.5 (61.7)	38.2 (100.8)
Mean maximum °C (°F)	8.9 (48.0)	9.6 (49.3)	13.0 (55.4)	20.1 (68.2)	26.2 (79.2)	27.5 (81.5)	28.9 (84.0)	28.9 (84.0)	25.8 (78.4)	19.8 (67.6)	9.8 (49.6)	6.8 (44.2)	30.4 (86.7)
Mean daily maximum °C (°F)	−6.7 (19.9)	−2.9 (26.8)	2.0 (35.6)	9.8 (49.6)	16.4 (61.5)	19.8 (67.6)	22.2 (72.0)	21.3 (70.3)	16.3 (61.3)	8.5 (47.3)	−1.0 (30.2)	−6.3 (20.7)	8.3 (46.9)
Daily mean °C (°F)	−11.4 (11.5)	−8.0 (17.6)	−3.3 (26.1)	4.1 (39.4)	9.8 (49.6)	13.8 (56.8)	16.2 (61.2)	15.1 (59.2)	10.5 (50.9)	3.7 (38.7)	−5.0 (23.0)	−10.5 (13.1)	2.9 (37.2)
Mean daily minimum °C (°F)	−16.0 (3.2)	−13.3 (8.1)	−8.8 (16.2)	−1.8 (28.8)	3.5 (38.3)	7.8 (46.0)	10.2 (50.4)	8.9 (48.0)	4.3 (39.7)	−1.4 (29.5)	−8.9 (16.0)	−14.7 (5.5)	−2.5 (27.5)
Mean minimum °C (°F)	−32.4 (−26.3)	−27.0 (−16.6)	−23.7 (−10.7)	−10.9 (12.4)	−3.3 (26.1)	2.2 (36.0)	5.1 (41.2)	2.8 (37.0)	−2.8 (27.0)	−10.7 (12.7)	−21.5 (−6.7)	−27.8 (−18.0)	−35.5 (−31.9)
Record low °C (°F)	−42.7 (−44.9)	−40.2 (−40.4)	−36.4 (−33.5)	−24.7 (−12.5)	−8.0 (17.6)	−1.4 (29.5)	1.7 (35.1)	−2.9 (26.8)	−8.4 (16.9)	−28.9 (−20.0)	−37.7 (−35.9)	−41.3 (−42.3)	−42.7 (−44.9)
Record low wind chill	−51.0	−51.2	−46.2	−31.6	−14.1	−3.5	0.0	−3.2	−10.1	−33.3	−54.0	−48.7	−54.0
Average precipitation mm (inches)	25.7 (1.01)	15.1 (0.59)	21.3 (0.84)	30.3 (1.19)	61.3 (2.41)	90.0 (3.54)	103.7 (4.08)	62.0 (2.44)	38.0 (1.50)	27.8 (1.09)	23.7 (0.93)	22.3 (0.88)	521.2 (20.52)
Average rainfall mm (inches)	1.0 (0.04)	0.3 (0.01)	1.1 (0.04)	14.2 (0.56)	54.4 (2.14)	94.7 (3.73)	96.0 (3.78)	62.4 (2.46)	39.5 (1.56)	15.5 (0.61)	2.0 (0.08)	0.5 (0.02)	381.5 (15.02)
Average snowfall cm (inches)	34.7 (13.7)	20.1 (7.9)	25.8 (10.2)	16.6 (6.5)	6.0 (2.4)	0.0 (0.0)	0.0 (0.0)	0.0 (0.0)	2.7 (1.1)	19.2 (7.6)	24.8 (9.8)	24.6 (9.7)	174.5 (6.87)
Average precipitation days (≥ 0.2 mm)	11.6	8.0	10.3	9.7	12.6	16.6	16.7	13.8	11.0	10.7	10.7	11.6	143.1
Average rainy days (≥ 0.2 mm)	0.71	0.76	1.7	5.6	11.6	16.3	17.1	13.4	11.5	7.2	1.9	0.56	88.3
Average snowy days (≥ 0.2 cm)	11.4	8.1	9.7	4.7	1.9	0.0	0.0	0.0	0.63	3.7	9.3	9.9	59.5
Average relative humidity (%) (at 15:00 LST)	73.5	63.5	55.4	45.1	42.7	51.3	53.1	52.7	53.1	57.9	73.2	74.3	58.0
Average dew point °C (°F)	−14.0 (6.8)	−12.2 (10.0)	−8.9 (16.0)	−4.0 (24.8)	1.1 (34.0)	7.0 (44.6)	10.1 (50.2)	9.5 (49.1)	4.7 (40.5)	−1.8 (28.8)	−7.9 (17.8)	−13.3 (8.1)	−2.5 (27.5)
Source 1: Environment Canada
Source 2: weatherstats.ca (for dewpoint and monthly&yearly average absolute maximum&minimum temperature)

== Demographics ==
Federal census population history
Year	Pop.	±%
1941	423	—
1951	397	−6.1%
1956	687	+73.0%
1961	1,054	+53.4%
1966	2,279	+116.2%
1971	3,202	+40.5%
1976	3,878	+21.1%
1981	5,585	+44.0%
1986	5,737	+2.7%
1991	6,938	+20.9%
1996	7,783	+12.2%
2001	8,334	+7.1%
2006	8,971	+7.6%
2011	9,605	+7.1%
2016	10,204	+6.2%
2021	9,927	−2.7%
Source: Statistics Canada

In the 2021 Census of Population conducted by Statistics Canada, the Town of Whitecourt had a population of 9,927 living in 3,876 of its 4,341 total private dwellings, a change of −2.8% from its 2016 population of 10,209. With a land area of 29.51 km^{2} (11.39 sq mi), it had a population density of 336.4/km^{2} (871.3/sq mi) in 2021.

In the 2016 Census of Population conducted by Statistics Canada, the Town of Whitecourt recorded a population of 10,204 living in 3,743 of its 4,253 total private dwellings, a 6.2% change from its 2011 population of 9,605. With a land area of 26.44 km^{2} (10.21 sq mi), it had a population density of 385.9/km^{2} (999.6/sq mi) in 2016.

The population of the Town of Whitecourt according to its 2013 municipal census is 10,574, a 14.9% increase over its 2008 municipal census population of 9,202.

Panethnic groups in the Town of Whitecourt (2001−2021)
Panethnic group	2021		2016		2011		2006		2001	
Panethnic group	Pop.	%	Pop.	%	Pop.	%	Pop.	%	Pop.	%
European (Note: Statistic includes all persons that did not make up part of a visible minority or an indigenous identity.)	7,560	76.67%	8,195	81.3%	7,945	83.24%	7,950	88.78%	7,390	89.04%
Indigenous	1,260	12.78%	1,135	11.26%	1,315	13.78%	880	9.83%	635	7.65%
Southeast Asian (Note: Statistic includes total responses of "Filipino" and "Southeast Asian" under visible minority section on census.)	695	7.05%	390	3.87%	175	1.83%	70	0.78%	30	0.36%
African	115	1.17%	75	0.74%	0	0%	20	0.22%	30	0.36%
South Asian	90	0.91%	105	1.04%	25	0.26%	0	0%	25	0.3%
East Asian (Note: Statistic includes total responses of "Chinese", "Korean", and "Japanese" under visible minority section on census.)	65	0.66%	160	1.59%	40	0.42%	25	0.28%	95	1.14%
Middle Eastern (Note: Statistic includes total responses of "West Asian" and "Arab" under visible minority section on census.)	50	0.51%	0	0%	0	0%	0	0%	60	0.72%
Latin American	20	0.2%	15	0.15%	0	0%	10	0.11%	25	0.3%
Other/multiracial (Note: Statistic includes total responses of "Visible minority, n.i.e." and "Multiple visible minorities" under visible minority section on census.)	0	0%	30	0.3%	10	0.1%	0	0%	10	0.12%
Total responses	9,860	99.33%	10,080	98.74%	9,545	99.38%	8,955	99.82%	8,300	99.59%
Total population	9,927	100%	10,209	100%	9,605	100%	8,971	100%	8,334	100%
Note: Totals greater than 100% due to multiple origin responses

== Economy ==
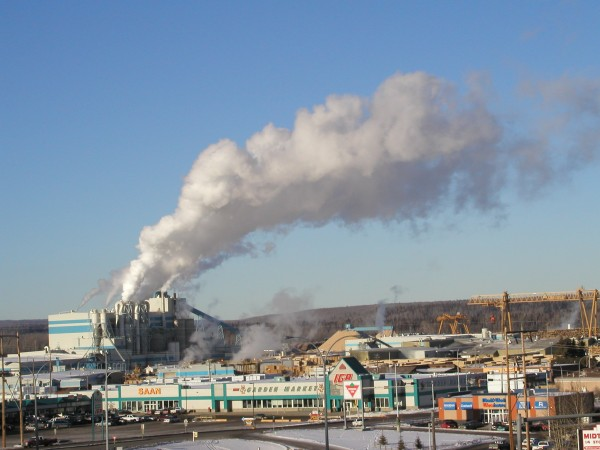
Millar Western sawmill/pulp mill

Whitecourt's economy is largely driven by three major industries – forestry, oil and gas industry and tourism. With some farm land to the south and east of Whitecourt, agriculture plays a minor role in the town's economy.

Whitecourt is the site of four forestry-related mills:

- Blue Ridge Lumber Sawmill / Ranger Board MDF (owned by West Fraser)
- Millar Western Pulp Mill (owned by Atlas Holdings)
- Canfor Sawmill
- Alberta Newsprint Company Pulp & Paper Mill.

Due to Whitecourt and area's forestry heritage, the Canadian Forestry Association named Whitecourt and Woodlands County the "Forest Capital of Canada 2013".

Whitecourt is also home to many service companies in the oil and gas industry.

== Attractions ==
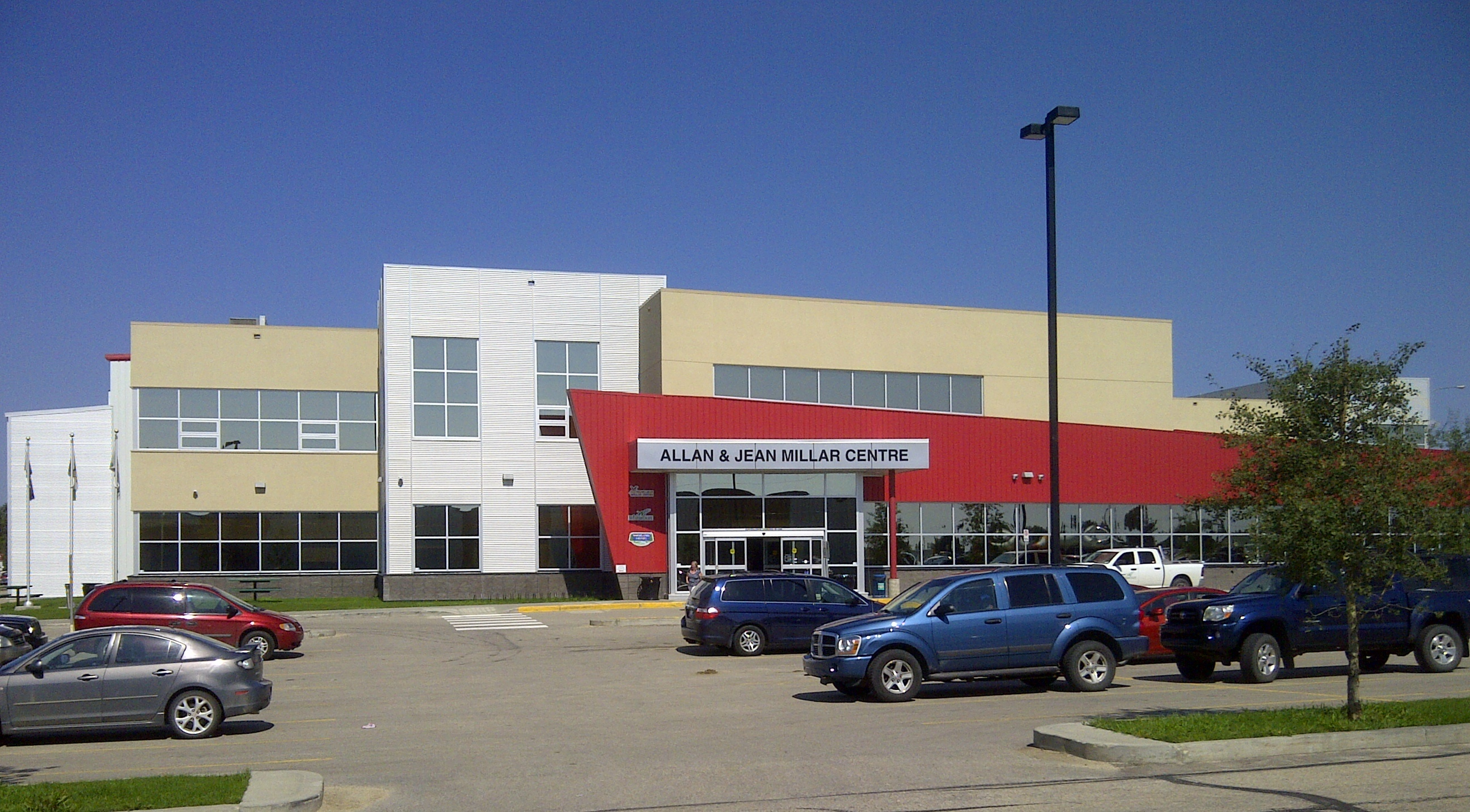
The Allan & Jean Millar Centre

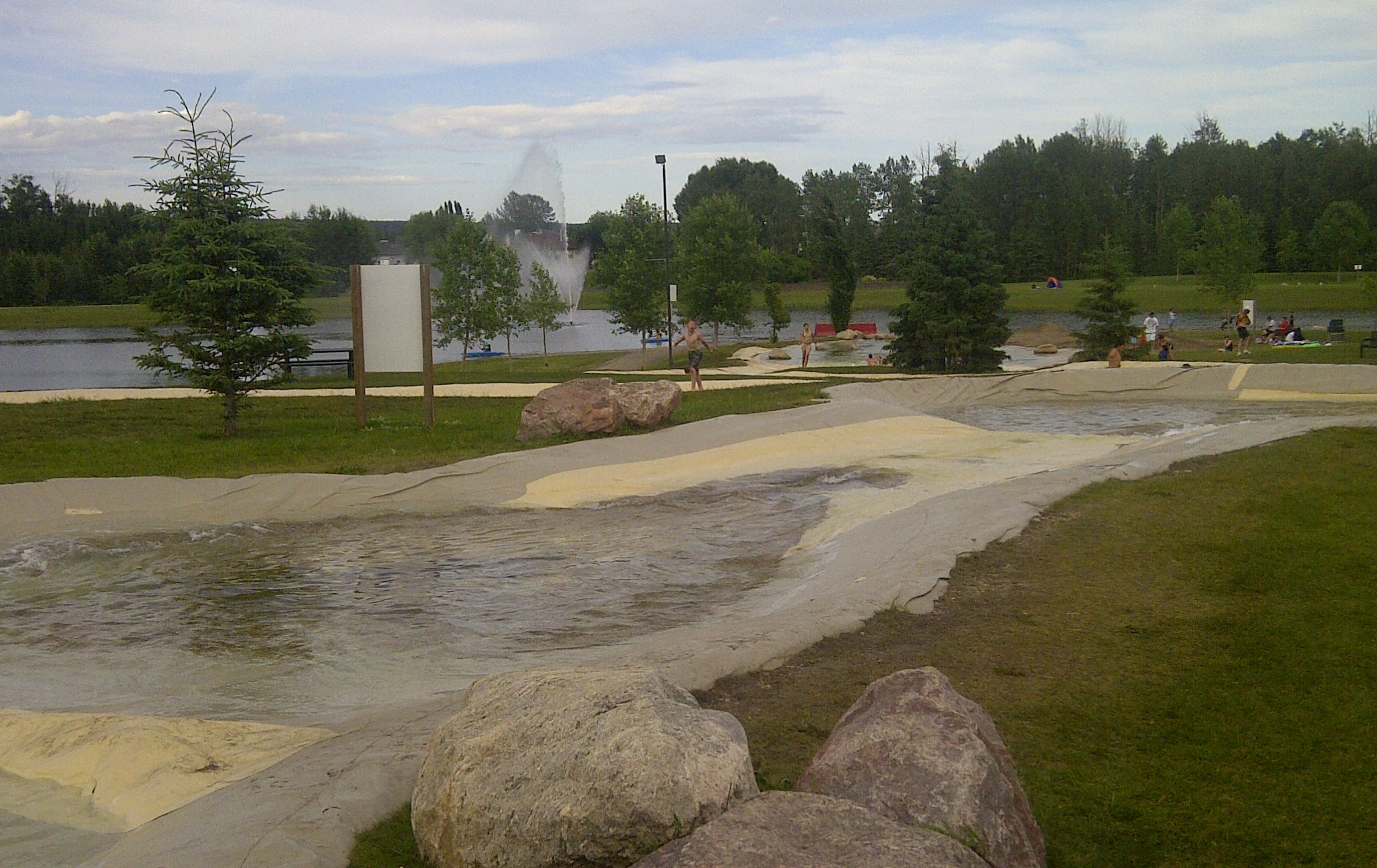
The Whitecourt River Slides overlooking the pond and fountain in Festival Park

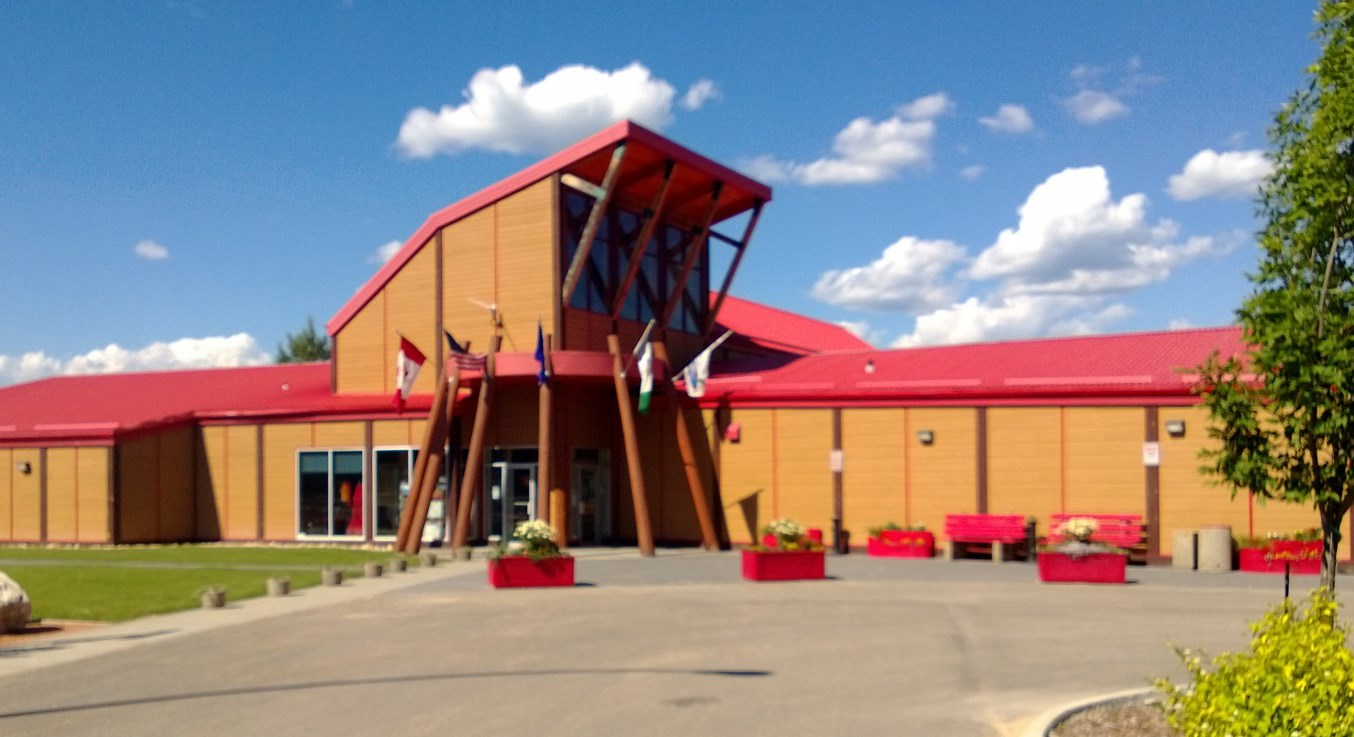
Whitecourt's Forest Interpretive Centre

Attractions within Whitecourt include the Allan & Jean Millar Centre, The Canfor Culture and Events Centre, Festival Park, the Forest Interpretive Centre and Heritage Park, and a variety of other facilities and parks.

The Allan & Jean Millar Centre consists of both an aquatic facility, a fieldhouse, a fitness facility, a children's indoor playground area, and boardroom and classroom rental spaces. The aquatic facility comprises a main pool, a children's pool, a leisure pool, a lazy river, a water slide, a hot tub, and a steam room. The fieldhouse includes a configurable multi-sport area, a track, and racquetball and squash courts. The fitness centre provides cardio training equipment, weight training equipment, and a fitness studio. Overall, this recreation venue also provides a variety of programming including lessons, classes, and personal training.

Festival Park, located in the river valley adjacent to downtown, is a multi-use outdoor park facility consisting of a pond stocked with fish that is cleared for skating in the winter, trails, sports fields, playgrounds, picnic areas, an off-leash dog park, and a river slide attraction featuring two flowing artificial creeks with drops for tubing. A splash park with 19 water features opened within Festival Park in 2012. The park was originally known as Rotary Park, but the name was changed to Festival Park in 2023 when Rotary International updated their policies on how facilities can be named after themselves.

The town also features several bike trails, as well as a professionally designed bike park.

The Forest Interpretive Centre includes a multi-media museum that presents the forestry industry's role in Whitecourt's history. It also features meeting rooms and hosts the local chamber of commerce, a tourist information centre, and town council meetings. The Forest Interpretive Centre's associated Heritage Park includes antique vehicles and farm equipment, a barn, and an interpretive trail among other features.

The Canfor Culture and Events Centre is an 8,250-square-meter multi-purpose facility with an estimated construction cost of $54.3 million. The centre houses the Town of Whitecourt's municipal administration offices, an expanded Whitecourt and District public library, a commercial kitchen, a conference centre, a 600-seat performing arts centre, and a galleria.

== Sports ==
Club	League	Sport	Venue	Years active	League championships	Provincial championships
Whitecourt Wolverines	NWJHL	Ice hockey	JDA Place	2007–12	4	1
Whitecourt Wolverines	AJHL	Ice hockey	JDA Place	2012–present	–	–

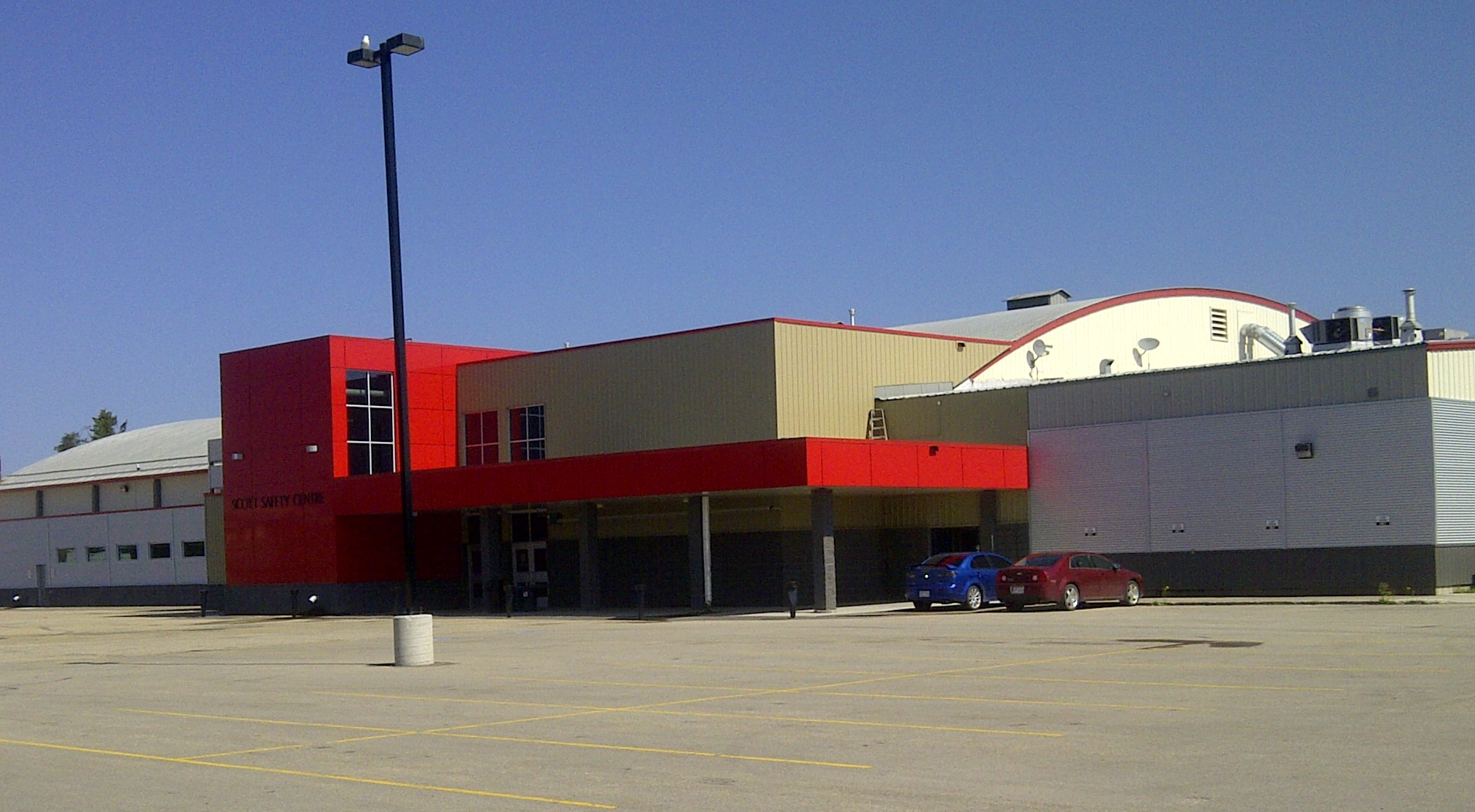
JDA Place, home of the Whitecourt Wolverines of the AJHL

Travis Roche and Rocky Thompson are current and former professional hockey players that were raised in Whitecourt. Roche played 60 games in the National Hockey League (NHL) between the Minnesota Wild and Phoenix Coyotes and now plays for SC Bern in Switzerland's National League A. He has represented Team Canada at the Spengler Cup on numerous occasions, winning gold at the 2012 tournament. Thompson played 25 games in the NHL between the Calgary Flames and Florida Panthers and was an assistant coach for the Edmonton Oilers in the National Hockey League.

Normand Lacombe is the strength and conditioning coach for the Whitecourt Wolverines of the Alberta Junior Hockey League (AJHL), and was the head coach of the predecessor Wolverines of the North West Junior Hockey League prior to the AJHL's arrival. Lacombe played 319 games in the NHL for the Buffalo Sabres, Edmonton Oilers and Philadelphia Flyers, winning the Stanley Cup with the Oilers in 1988.

== Government ==
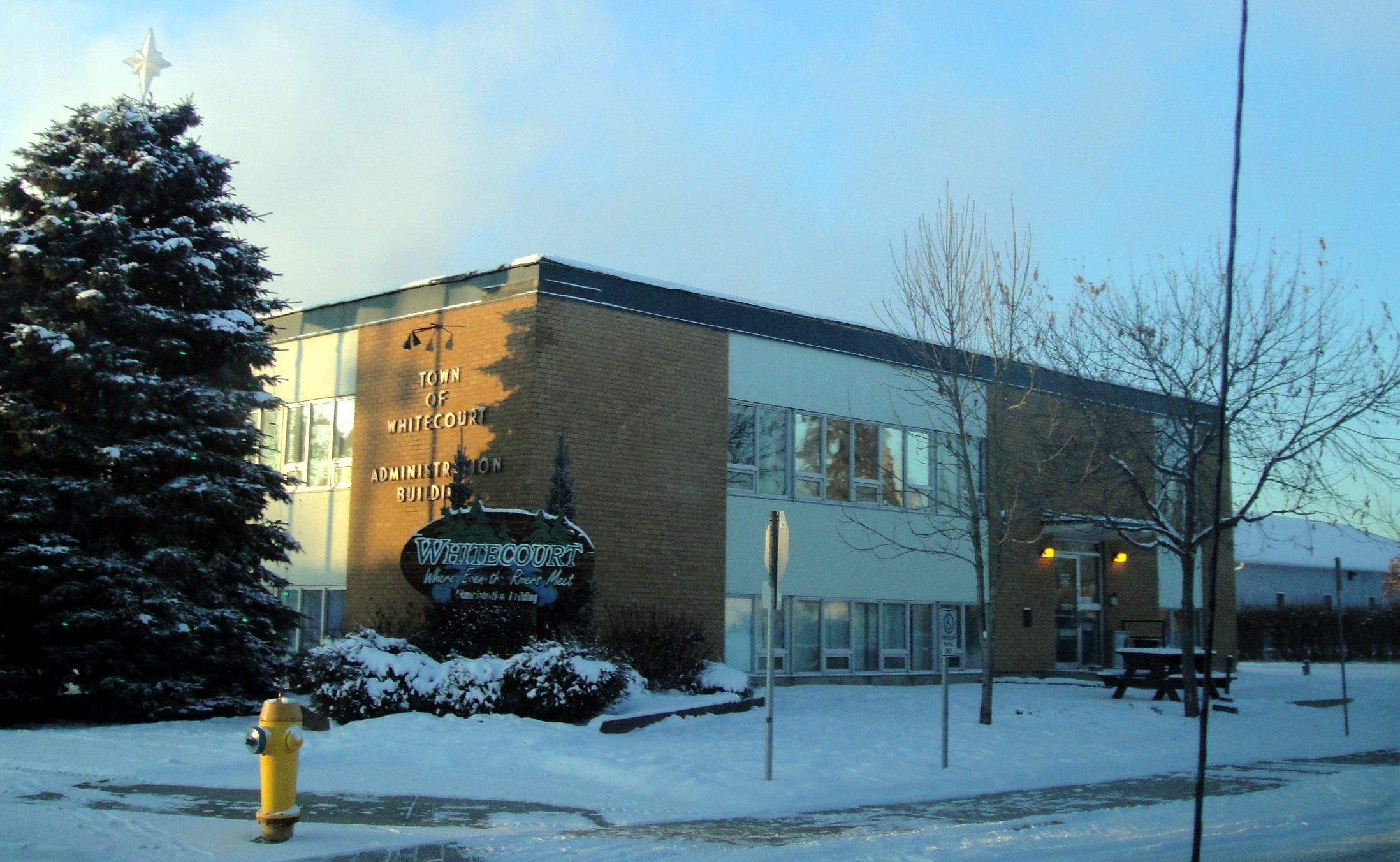
Town office in downtown Whitecourt

Whitecourt Town Council consists of a mayor and six councillors that were elected in the 2025 municipal election. As of 2025 the members of town council are Mayor Ray Hilts and councillors Tara Baker, Mike Braun, Braden Lanctot, Serena LaPointe, Bill McAree, and Bryan Wynn. The town's chief administrative officer is Peter Smyl.

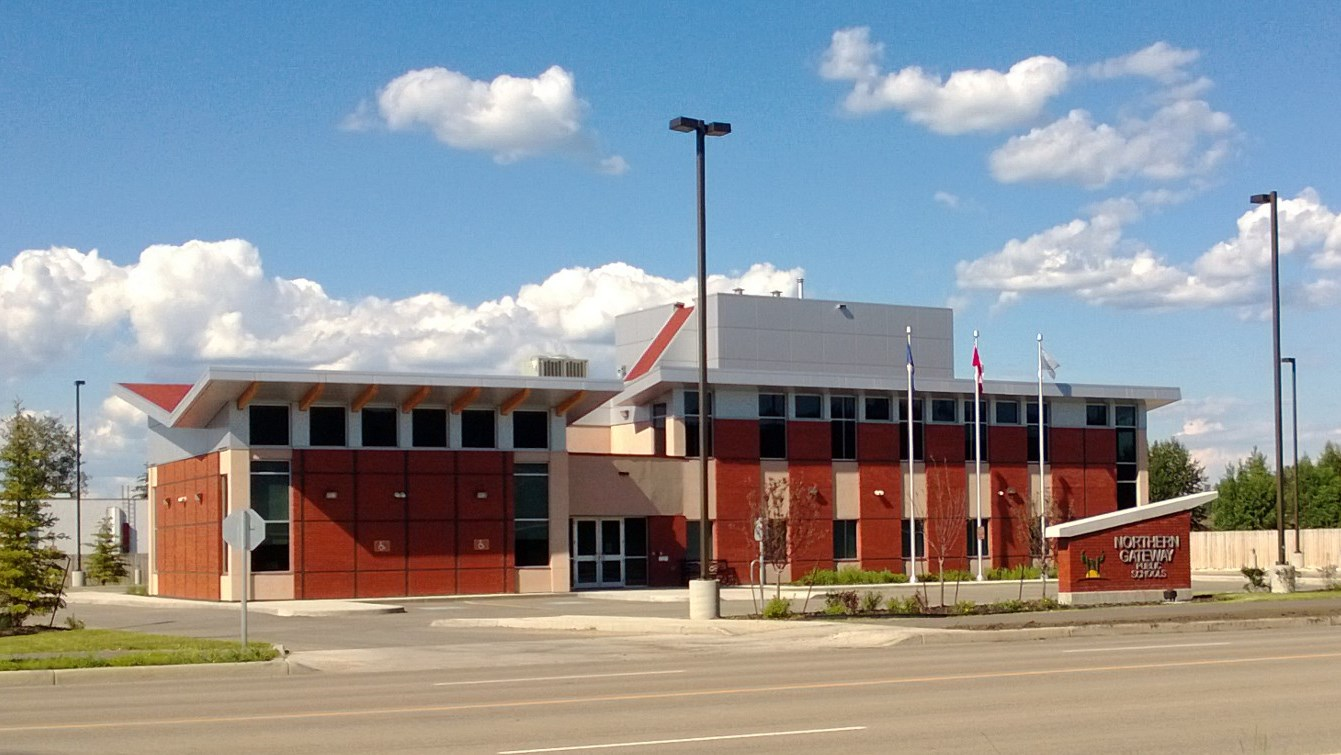
Division office of Northern Gateway Public Schools in downtown Whitecourt

The Northern Gateway Public Schools division office is in Whitecourt. The school division is responsible for public schools within the geography comprising Lac Ste. Anne County and portions of Woodlands County and the Municipal District of Greenview No. 16, including the towns of Fox Creek, Mayerthorpe, Onoway and Valleyview in addition to Whitecourt.

Whitecourt is within the West Yellowhead provincial electoral district, which as of 2023 is represented by Martin Long of the United Conservative Party. Progressive Conservative George VanderBurg was a four-term MLA for the Whitecourt area until 2015. A resident of Whitecourt, VanderBurg was a businessman and the mayor of the town for nine years prior to his entry into provincial politics.

At the federal level, Whitecourt is within the Peace River—Westlock electoral district, which as of 2023 is represented by Conservative Arnold Viersen. Conservative Rob Merrifield was a four-term MP for the Whitecourt area until 2014. Merrifield is a resident of Whitecourt and a farmer.

Other former politicians who lived in Whitecourt include Raj Pannu, Allen Sulatycky and Rod Fox. Pannu, former MLA for Edmonton-Strathcona and former leader of the Alberta New Democratic Party, taught high school in Whitecourt between 1962 and 1964. Sulatycky, judge and former MP for Rocky Mountain, was a lawyer and was elected the first Liberal to represent Whitecourt's constituency in 1968. Fox, former Wildrose Party MLA for Lacombe-Ponoka, was born and raised in Whitecourt.

== Infrastructure ==
=== Health care ===
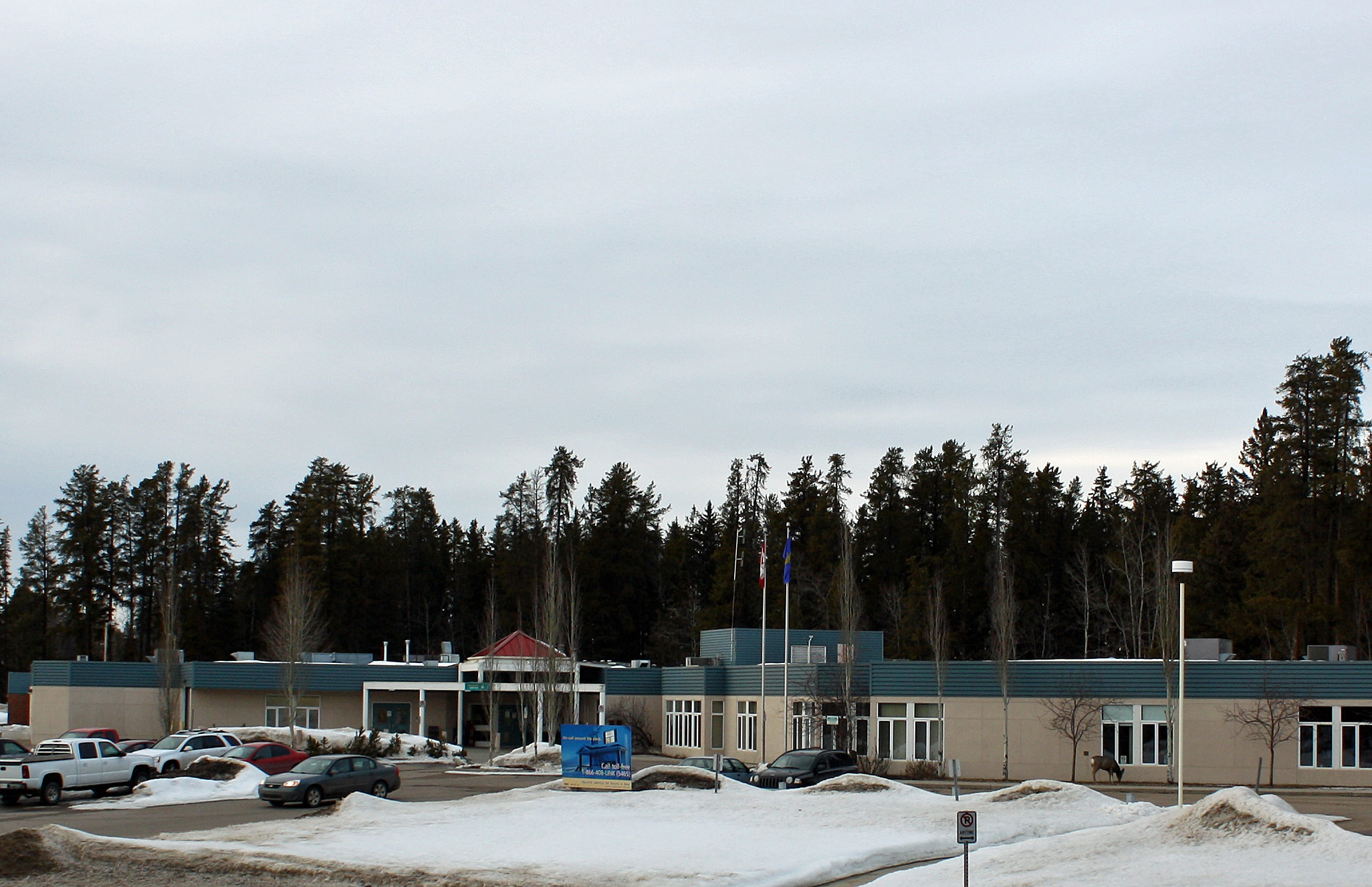
The Whitecourt Healthcare Centre located on Sunset Boulevard

Acute and non-acute medical care is provided at the Whitecourt Healthcare Centre.

=== Transportation ===
Air

The full air-service Whitecourt Airport is located west of Whitecourt on the north side of Highway 32, approximately 5 kilometres (3.1 mi) from Highway 43. It is Alberta's ninth busiest airport with up to 32,000 aircraft using the airport annually. The airstrip is 5,800 ft (1,800 m) in length and 100 ft (30 m) wide and can accommodate 737 jets. Numerous carriers offer scheduled charter flights out of the airport.

Bus

Red Arrow and Northern Express offer service to Edmonton and Grande Prairie.

Rail

The CN Sangudo Subdivision provides rail service through Whitecourt from Edmonton to numerous gas plants south of Fox Creek. The Millar Western Sawmill / Pulp Mill and the Alberta Newsprint Company Pulp & Paper Mill are both served by rail.

Roads

The Town of Whitecourt is served by two highways. Highway 43, which is part of the CANAMEX Corridor, is a twinned highway that provides connection to Edmonton to the southeast and Grande Prairie to the northwest.

Highway 32 provides Whitecourt with a direct link to the Yellowhead Highway (Highway 16) to the south, which connects the town to Edson and Hinton to the southwest. Another segment of Highway 32 begins approximately 6 km (3.7 mi) northwest of the town, providing a link from Highway 43 to Swan Hills and Slave Lake.

Numerous local roads provide connections from Whitecourt to surrounding rural areas within Woodlands County. Within the McLeod River valley, Govenlock Road feeds two rural roads – West Mountain Road (Range Road 122) and Tower Road (Range Road 121A) – that provide access to numerous country residential subdivisions and some agricultural operations to the south.

Within the Athabasca River valley, Flats Road (Township Road 600), which exits the town following its northern boundary, serves numerous agricultural operations to the east.

On the Hilltop, 41 Avenue (Township Road 594A), which was the original highway alignment into Whitecourt, exits the town eastbound for the Hamlet of Blue Ridge. This road is commonly referred to as Blue Ridge Road.

== Education ==
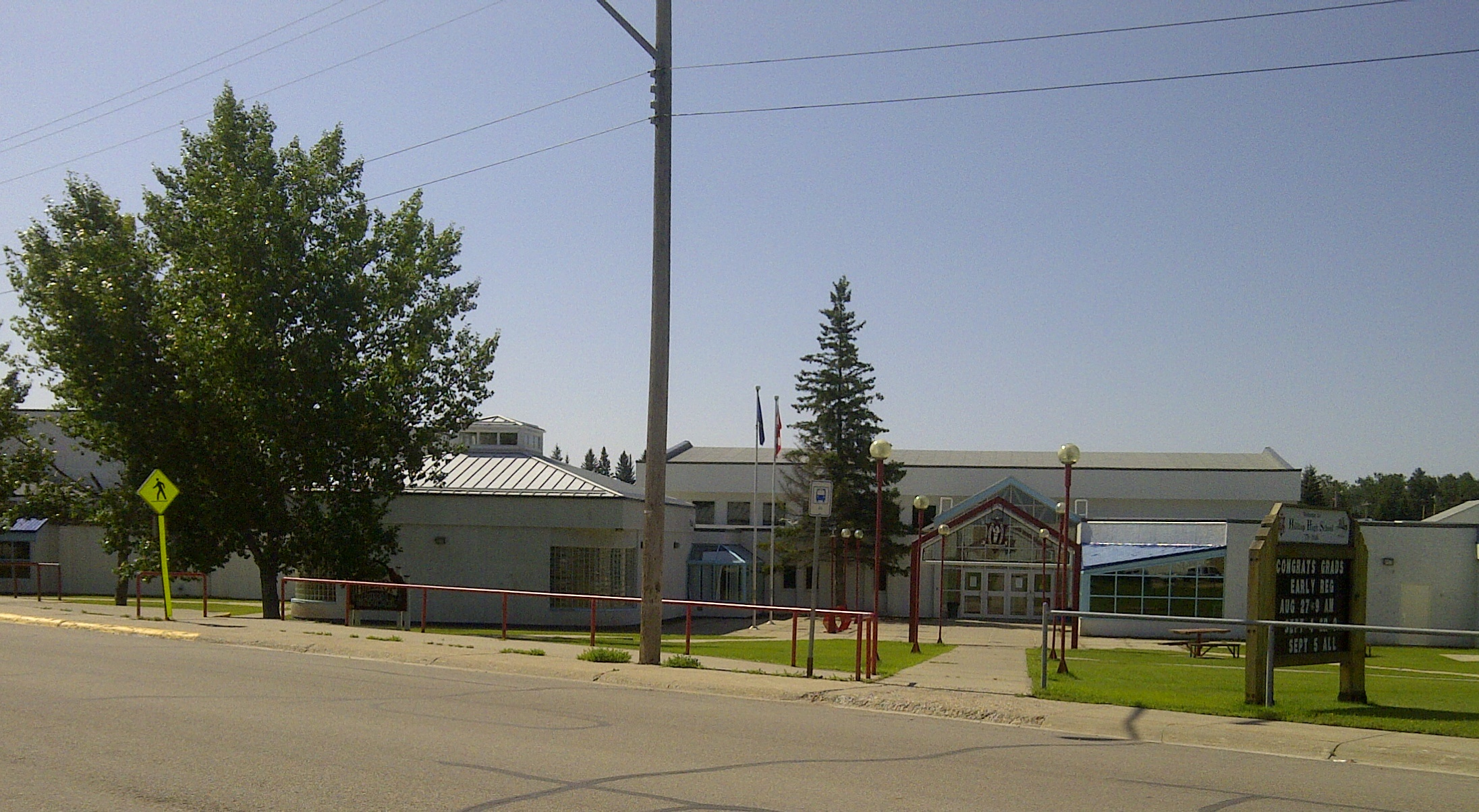
Hilltop High School main entrance

Northern Gateway Regional Division No. 10

- Central Elementary School (K-5)
- Pat Hardy Elementary School (K-5)
- Percy Baxter Middle School (6-8)
- Hilltop Jr/Sr High School (9-12)

Living Waters Catholic Regional Division No. 42

- St. Anne's School (K-3)
- St. Mary's School (4-6)
- St. Joseph School (7-12)

== Media ==
Newspapers

Whitecourt is served by two news outlets: the Postmedia owned Whitecourt Star (which became digital-only in 2023) and the independent weekly Whitecourt Press. The monthly Community Advisor ceased publication in 2018.

Radio

Two FM radio stations broadcast from Whitecourt.

- Boom 96.7 (FM 96.7, CFXW-FM) is owned by Stingray Radio and broadcasts a classic hits format.
- XM 105 FM (FM 105.3, CIXM-FM) is owned by Pattison Media and broadcasts a country radio format.

The CKUA Radio Network also has a repeater broadcasting from Whitecourt at FM 107.1.

== Sister cities ==
Whitecourt has been twinned with Yūbetsu, Hokkaido, Japan, since 1998.

== See also ==
- List of communities in Alberta
- List of towns in Alberta
