= Dual enrollment =

Enrollment in two separate educational institutions

In the United States, dual enrollment (DE), also called concurrent enrollment, programs allow students to be enrolled in two separate, academically related institutions. Generally, it refers to high school students taking college or university courses. Less commonly, it may refer to any individual who is participating in two related programs.

== History ==
Dual enrollment was first started in 1955 by the University of Connecticut under the direction of Provost Albert Waugh. It was his belief that the senior year in high school was not challenging enough for many students, resulting in student boredom and disinterest in learning - now called senioritis. He believed that it was the University's responsibility to engage with the high schools to offer introductory University courses at the high school, allowing a more rigorous academic experience and giving students a head start for college.

In the mid-1990s a movement started to formalize a national accreditation body for concurrent and dual enrollment programs. In March 1997 the first national meeting of concurrent enrollment professionals was convened by Syracuse University at the American Association for Higher Education conference. Two years later, in 1999, 20 institutions of higher education officially established the National Alliance of Concurrent Enrollment Partnerships - NACEP - by adopting bylaws and a mission statement.

== Examples ==
Students enrolled in secondary school may be simultaneously enrolled at a local institution of higher learning, such as a community college or university. If students pass their college classes, they receive credit that may be applied toward their high school diploma and toward a college degree or certificate. Many state governments within the United States have recognized the benefit of dual enrollment and have consequently instructed their public universities to begin collaborating with local schools. Some private universities also participate. A 2011 study concluded that student experience differs dramatically from one program to the next.

Dual enrollment can be advantageous to students because it allows them to get a head start on their college careers. In some cases, the student may even be able to attain an Associate of Arts or equivalent degree shortly before or after their high school graduation. Furthermore, participation in dual enrollment may ease the transition from high school to college by giving students a sense of what college academics are like. In addition, dual enrollment may be a cost-efficient way for students to accumulate college credits because courses are often paid for and taken through the local high school.

A number of different models for dual enrollment programs exist, one of which is concurrent enrollment. Concurrent enrollment is defined as credit hours earned when a high school student is taking a college course for both high school and college credit, during the high school day, on the high school campus, taught by a qualified high school instructor. Many prominent universities started the movement of concurrent enrollment - UConn Early College Experience and Syracuse University Project Advance. In the George Washington Early College Program (GWECP-AA), students at the School Without Walls Senior High School are enrolled at the George Washington University and take a full course-load at the university, along with other undergraduate students. These college courses are used to fulfill the students' high school graduation requirements for District of Columbia Public Schools.

Concurrent enrollment in states such as California allows students to enroll in college courses while simultaneously attending their high school or even a lower grade which differs from dual-enrollment which is for high school students. In California, with permission from the school's principal, middle schoolers may enroll in college classes typically taught at local community colleges.

== Cost ==
Dual enrollment-like programs come with a cost, whether paid for by the student, school district or a combination of other state funded programs. Out of the fifty states in the United States, parents of students interested in the program are primarily responsible for the tuition cost in nine of those states. In Louisiana, New Mexico, North Carolina, Ohio, Oregon and Tennessee, the states themselves are responsible for student tuition payment and in other states like Florida, the school district is responsible for the student dual enrollment program tuition. States may choose to go into a contract with a secondary institution and may be reimbursed upon students' satisfactory grade achievement. States and school districts may also choose to cover all or part of the tuition cost with a max college credit limit before the student is responsible for payment.

Running Start or Expanded Options (Oregon) programs allow students to take college classes at their local community college. One of the main differences between Running Start and a regular dual enrollment program is the cost. The Running Start program makes tuition rates lower for high school students. Since FAFSA does not allow high school students to receive student aid. Running Start removes some of the barriers high school students face in taking college courses.

There are some online learning platforms that allow high school students to take college classes fully online through their platform. These classes are typically asynchronous and a lower cost dual enrollment option.

Parents of students who are enrolled in a dual enrollment program may qualify for a tuition and fees tax deduction for up to $4,000 per year.

== Criticism ==
From a financial stand point, in the United States some aspects grant funding to both the high school and colleges per student. It can be hard, unless explicitly stated by law, to determine which institution should receive the funding. There have been cases in the past where both institutions claimed the state funds leading to the state paying for the student twice.

=== Students ===
A study on students in dual enrollment where participants were given pseudonyms and interviewed on their thoughts on what dual enrollment offered revealed some positive and some negative themes that appeared across the interviews. Among the positives, students mentioned “exposure, learning the hidden curriculum, and independence and freedom.”

Students further explained each theme during their interviews. Exposure referred to the general atmosphere of the college experience. Students were able to become more comfortable with being in a college setting and were more prepared for attending college once they graduated high school. “Learning the hidden curriculum” referred to students learning that college was not just about learning the material a class was teaching them. They also needed to learn study habits, how to ask professors for help, and other beneficial student practices, all of which contrast to high school experiences. A student (whose pseudonym is Carmen) noted that high school teachers tend to hold the student's hand and give them as much help as they can. This contrasts to college professors who only help students when asked to do so. “Independence and freedom” was often used by the students to describe themselves overcoming fear and maturing. Most students explained how they had much more freedom and often thought to themselves “I can do whatever I want.” These students then realized the consequences of doing whatever they felt like, and learned from their mistakes, and learned. One student even reflected on the actions of her past and said, “I feel so disrespectful now, now that I think about it.”

The students did not have only positive things to say about dual enrollment. Three themes were found in their interviews: “issues in credit and grades, negative interactions with others, and limited support systems.”

The biggest problem brought up by students was “issues in credit and grades.” Students often lamented how their grades in college classes would affect their overall high school transcript and quite often result in a lower GPA. They were worried how it would affect their acceptance rate in other colleges later on. Poor grades in dual enrollment courses can hurt students’ chances of receiving financial aid as well as their eligibility to enroll in a four-year college or university. However, colleges also consider a student's dual enrollment classes as a demonstration that a student has taken initiative to get a head start on their college education as well as possesses the ability to handle college-level coursework. “Negative interactions with others” was described by students with how they were treated. The students felt cast out as many college students would treat them differently and would even get remarks that made them felt threatened. The dual enrollment students reflect on their past actions might have warranted such treatment as Roger says, “we weren't very mature.” The final negative theme – “limited support systems” – stems to both the college and the high school. Students described that, once enrolled in dual enrollment, their high school counsellors and other faculty seemed to work with the students less. They felt like they were no longer a part of the general group of the high school. In the college setting, where they were expected to know material from courses they may have not taken yet. The college tutoring sessions were held during times that the dual enrollment students could not make. As Alicia says, “I didn't feel like an actual student.”

=== Faculty members ===
A survey taken by teachers, counselors, and principals from 35 high schools was held to learn the opinions of faculty on dual enrollment (the term concurrent enrollment was used in the study). When asked how the school was impacted, the responses were positive all around. Many of the responses focused on students being able to earn college credit and be introduced to a college atmosphere. When asked how the students were impacted, most of the responses were positive as well, except the survey item “the student considered for the first time going to college.” Many respondents were neutral with only 35% agreeing. Students were thought to have already planned to move on to college before trying dual enrollment. The faculty commented on how dual enrollment gave students the opportunity to gain college credit. Teachers focused on how the increased difficulty of college courses prepared them for later. Counselors and teachers both noticed personal gains in students as well. Students had an increase in confidence and were willing to participate in more challenging studies.

=== Students of color and low income students ===
Although dual enrollment generally has a positive success rate in relation to college enrollment and completion, the results for low-income students and students of color displays a major difference. As a whole, college completion rates among dual enrollment students and non-dual enrollment students is higher at 22 percent as well as college enrollment rates being 34 percent higher. When looking exclusively at dual credit students of color enrollment and completion rates compared to non-dual credit the numbers show an obvious positive outcome with a 26 percent higher enrollment rate and 14 percent higher completion rate. Looking at those success rates against the success rates of other students researchers found a gap ranging from 4 to 8 percent. A study that took place in Florida was able to combat these results with their own when they found the number of dual credit students of color and non-dual credit to enroll and complete college was both equal.

A University of Connecticut study (2016) indicated that students in middle-income and lower-income family quartiles had higher participation rates in concurrent enrollment programs than students in higher-income family quartiles. One attributing factor for these findings is that an increasing number of first-generation students and middle income families see the value of high-access low-cost opportunities because attending college is still aspirational and not guaranteed for students in these groups. Concurrent and dual enrollment programs that waive or reduce fees to students participating in the Federal Free & Reduced Lunch program can positively impact participation rates for these students.

== In college ==
Colleges may create partnerships with schools that allow high school students to enroll in college classes or programs. Most universities have some degree of interdepartmental dual enrollment coordination. Arizona State University, for example, partnered with a group of Phoenix, Arizona charter schools called ASU Preparatory Academy. The partnerships grants students the ability to enroll in one of ASU's online Global Freshman Academy courses as either independent study electives or while taking a similar higher level high school course.

High schools might also have a partnerships with a group of colleges, such as Five Colleges (Massachusetts), Seven Sisters (Northeast), or Five Colleges of Ohio. That allows students to benefit from the collective knowledge of all universities and prevent them from duplicating unnecessary course offerings at each institution. Most universities have some degree of interdepartmental dual enrollment coordination.

== See also ==
- Early college high school
- Running Start
