= Huntsville High School =

Huntsville High School may refer to:

== Active ==
- Huntsville High School (Alabama), in Huntsville, Alabama, United States
- Huntsville High School (Arkansas), in Huntsville, Arkansas, United States
- Huntsville High School (Ontario), in Huntsville, Ontario, Canada
- Huntsville High School (Texas), in Huntsville, Texas, United States

== Former ==
- Huntsville High School (Tennessee), formerly on the National Register of Historic Places listings in Tennessee
