= Accelerated Learning Solutions =

Charter school operator in Miramar, Florida

Location
- Miramar, Broward County, Florida; United States

District information
- Schools: 10

Accelerated Learning Solutions is a charter school operator headquartered in Miramar, Florida. The company focuses operations on dropout prevention and credit recovery schools.

As of January 2013, Accelerated Learning Solutions operated 10 schools in Florida. In 2013 the company expanded to Charlotte, North Carolina with the opening of Charlotte Charter High and West Charlotte Charter High.

Randle Richardson is Chief Executive Office of Accelerated Learning Solutions, which focuses on potential high school drop-outs. Phil McNally is Chairman.

== Schools ==
The company's schools include:

=== Florida ===
- Flagler High School in Pompano Beach, Florida
- North Nicholas High School in Cape Coral, Florida, an alternative school for students at risk of dropping out.

=== North Carolina ===
- Charlotte Charter High in Charlotte, North Carolina, a dropout prevention and credit recovery school
- West Charlotte Charter High in Charlotte, North Carolina a dropout prevention and credit recovery school
- Central Wake High School in Raleigh, North Carolina, a dropout prevention and credit recovery school
