= Hillsboro High School =

Hillsboro High School may refer to any of several high schools in the United States:

- Hillsboro High School (Illinois)
- Hillsboro High School (Kansas)
- Hillsboro High School (Missouri)
- Hillsboro High School (New Mexico), a historic building
- Hillsboro High School (North Dakota), Hillsboro, North Dakota
- Hillsboro High School (Ohio)
- Hillsboro High School (Oregon)
- Hillsboro High School (Tennessee), Nashville
- Hillsboro High School (Texas)
- Hillsboro High School (Wisconsin), a high school in Wisconsin
- Hillsboro-Deering High School, Hillsborough, New Hampshire
