= Hilltop High School (Whitecourt) =

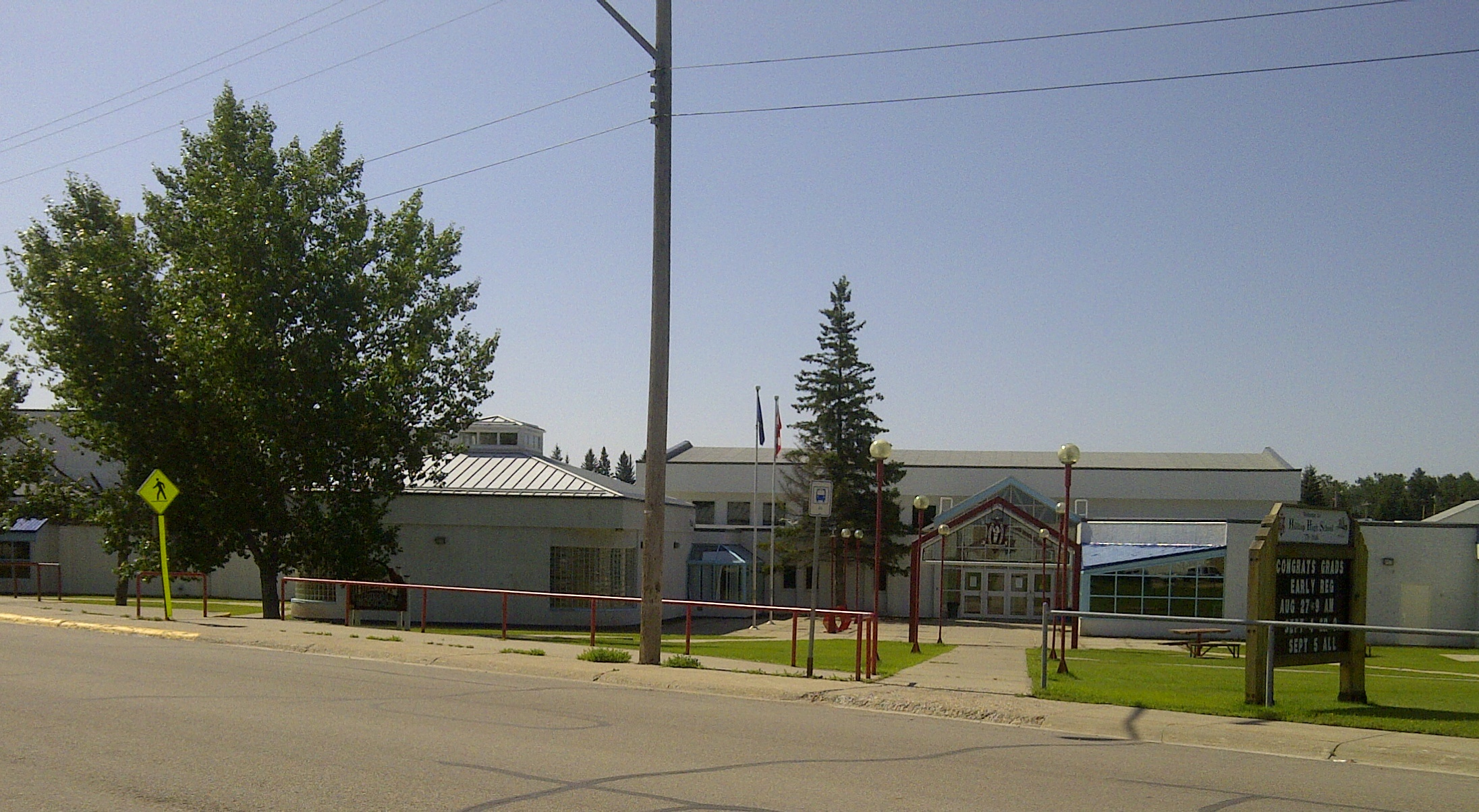

Location
- 71 Sunset Boulevard; Whitecourt, Alberta, T7S 1N1; Canada
- Coordinates: 54.128°N 115.670°W

Information
- School type: Public, senior high school
- Motto: A great place to LEARN…and more!
- School board: Northern Gateway Regional Division No. 10
- Principal: Mr. Brent Northcott (2026)
- Grades: 9-12
- Enrollment: 554 (September 30, 2012)
- Language: English
- Team name: Chargers
- Website: hth.ngrd.ab.ca

Hilltop High School (HHS) is a public junior/senior high school located in Whitecourt, Alberta, Canada providing education to students in grades 9 through 12.
