= Senioritis =

Decreased motivation among last-year students

Senioritis is the colloquial name for the decreased motivation toward education felt by students who are nearing the end of their high school, college, graduate school careers, or the end of a school year in general. Senioritis is usually seen in high school or college seniors, but can sometimes manifest symptoms in earlier years. Senioritis is not a recognized medical condition, but a colloquial term in the United States and Canada that combines the word senior with the medical suffix -itis to denote a medical condition.

== Consequences ==
In some cases where students allow their grades to drop significantly, it is possible for universities to rescind offers of admission. However, most colleges rarely rescind admission offers; even the most elite schools only revoke them from a very small number of students.

The time gap between college and university admissions, which are usually decided by March or April, and final exams, which usually are not until early May (e.g. Advanced Placement and International Baccalaureate classes), may cause a lack of motivation in seniors.

== Strategies to avoid senioritis ==
Several purported pedagogical strategies have been proposed to mitigate the impact of senioritis. For example, the practice of setting goals, including both short and long term, is said to motivate students to remain on track academically. Another strategy is taking breaks during mentally exhausting tasks, which may alleviate some sensations of stress, and decrease burnout. Rewarding accomplishments, no matter how small, can provide a sense of pride in one's achievements.

== Proposed solutions ==
James Coleman, writer and Chairman of the President's Panel of Youth, urged changes in the high school curriculum to address the problem of senioritis. Continued concerns gave rise to the implementation of a "Senior Semester" in many high schools throughout the United States, which allowed seniors to spend time outside the school or attend seminars within their specific interests.

The College Board, the National Youth Leadership Council, and other youth-serving organizations have suggested ways in which schools can help young people make the most of their senior year instead of succumbing to the temptation to take it easy once graduation is assured. Giving young people opportunities to make their academic work more meaningful through service-learning, or other forms of experiential education, can increase students' academic aspirations.

== See also ==
- Sophomore slump
- Student syndrome
