= Index of Alberta-related articles =

Articles related to the Canadian province of Alberta include:

== 0–9 ==
- .ab.ca – Internet second-level domain for the Province of Alberta.

== A ==
- Alberta Act 1905
- Alberta Alliance Party
- Alberta First Party
- Alberta Forest Products Association
- Alberta Greens
- Alberta Liberal Party
- Alberta New Democratic Party
- Alberta Party Political Association
- Alberta Progressive Conservatives
- Alberta separatism
- Alberta's Rockies
- Albertosaurus

== B ==
- Barrington Griffiths Watch Company
- Battle of Alberta

== C ==
- Charter schools in Alberta
- Calgary Region
- Calgary Scientific Inc
- Calgary True Buddha Pai Yuin Temple
- Central Alberta
- Clean Scene
- Coat of Arms of Alberta

== E ==
- Edmonton Metropolitan Region
- Elections Alberta
- Environmental issues in Alberta

== F ==
- First Nations in Alberta
- Flag of Alberta
- Franco-Albertans

== G ==
- Geography of Alberta
- Green Party of Alberta (2011–present)

== H ==
- History of Alberta
- History of Edmonton
- History of Lethbridge

== I ==
- Inspiring Education: A Dialogue with Albertans
- Industry in Alberta

== L ==
- Legislative Assembly of Alberta
- List of airports in Alberta
- List of Alberta general elections
- List of Alberta lieutenant-governors
- List of Alberta premiers
- List of census agglomerations in Alberta
- List of census divisions of Alberta
- List of communities in Alberta
- List of cities in Alberta
- List of designated places in Alberta
- List of ghost towns in Alberta
- List of hamlets in Alberta
- List of Indian reserves in Alberta
- List of lakes of Alberta
- List of municipal districts in Alberta
- List of municipalities in Alberta
- List of population centres in Alberta
- List of protected areas of Alberta
- List of rivers of Alberta
- List of school authorities in Alberta
- List of settlements in Alberta
- List of summer villages in Alberta
- List of television stations in Alberta
- List of towns in Alberta
- List of universities in Alberta
- List of villages in Alberta
- Lubicon Lake (Cree) Indian Nation

== M ==
- Métis in Alberta
- Valentine Milvain
- Ministry of Gaming (Alberta)
- Mountains of Alberta

== N ==
- Northern Alberta

== O ==
- Old Strathcona

== P ==
- Palliser's Triangle
- Politics of Alberta

== R ==
- Representative Party of Alberta
- Red Mile

== S ==
- Same-sex marriage in Alberta
- Separation Party of Alberta
- Social Credit Party of Alberta
- Socialist Party of Alberta
- Southern Alberta
- Special Areas Board
- Specialized municipalities of Alberta
- Symbols of Alberta

== T ==
- TUXIS Parliament of Alberta

== U ==
- United Farmers of Alberta
- United Conservative Party
- University of Alberta
- University of Calgary

== V ==
- Voice for Animals Humane Society

== See also ==
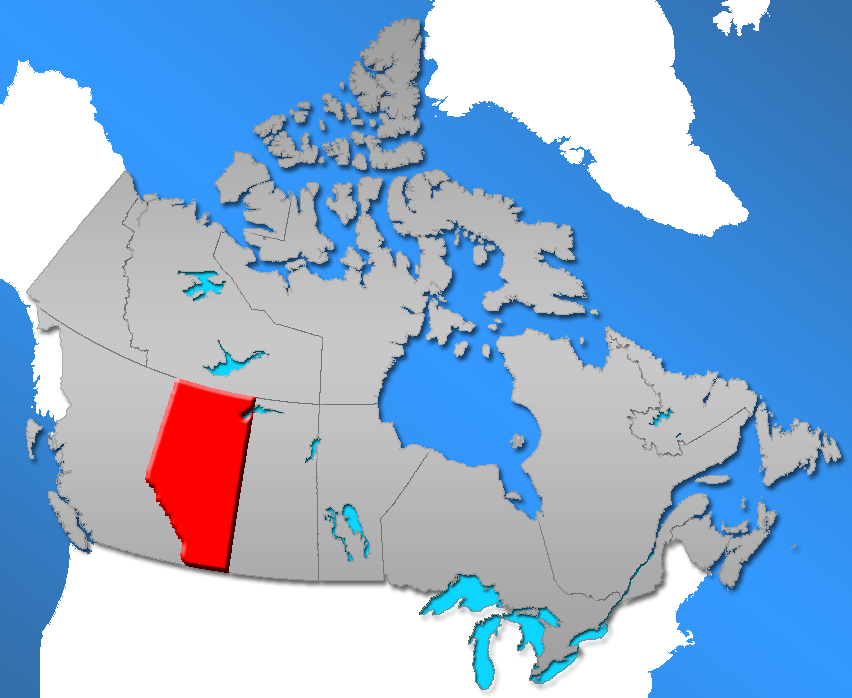
Lists of topics by provinces and territories
- Topic overview:
  - Alberta
  - Outline of Alberta
