= Outline of Alberta =

Province of Canada

Flag of Alberta

Location of Alberta

The following outline is provided as an overview of and topical guide to Alberta:

Alberta – province of Canada. It had a population of 3,645,257 in 2011, making it the most populous of Canada's three prairie provinces. Alberta and its neighbour, Saskatchewan, were established as provinces on September 1, 1905. Alberta is located in western Canada, bounded by the provinces of British Columbia to the west and Saskatchewan to the east, the Northwest Territories to the north, and the U.S. state of Montana to the south. Alberta is one of three Canadian provinces and territories to border only a single U.S. state and is also one of only two provinces that are landlocked.

== General reference ==
- Pronunciation: /ælˈbɜːrtə/
- Common English name(s): Alberta
- Official English name: Alberta
  - Abbreviations and name codes
    - Postal symbol: "T"
    - ISO 3166-2 code: CA-AB
    - Internet second-level domain: .ab.ca
- Common endonym(s):
- Official endonym(s):
- Adjectival(s): Alberta
- Demonym(s): Albertan

== Geography of Alberta ==
Geography of Alberta

- Alberta is: a landlocked province of Canada
- Location:
  - The regions in which Alberta is located are:
    - Northern Hemisphere, Western Hemisphere
      - Americas
        - North America
          - Northern America
            - Canada
              - Western Canada
                - Canadian Prairies
  - Extreme points of Alberta
- Population of Alberta: 4,067,175 (2016)
- Area of Alberta: 661,848 km^{2} (255,541 sq mi)
- Atlas of Alberta

=== Environment of Alberta ===
- Protected areas of Alberta
  - Provincial historic sites of Alberta
- Wildlife of Alberta
  - Birds of Alberta

==== Natural geographic features of Alberta ====
- Glaciers of Alberta
- Lakes of Alberta
- Mountains of Alberta
  - Mountain ranges of Alberta
  - Mountain passes of Alberta
  - Peaks on the Alberta–British Columbia border
- Rivers of Alberta
  - Waterfalls of Alberta
- Valleys of Alberta
  - coulees in Alberta
- Hot springs of Alberta
- World Heritage Sites in Alberta
  - Canadian Rocky Mountain Parks World Heritage Site
  - Dinosaur Provincial Park
  - Head-Smashed-In Buffalo Jump
  - Waterton-Glacier International Peace Park
  - Wood Buffalo National Park

=== Regions of Alberta ===
- Northern Alberta
  - Peace River Country
- Alberta's Rockies
- Southern Alberta
  - Cypress Hills
  - Palliser's Triangle
- Calgary Region
  - Calgary–Edmonton Corridor
- Edmonton Capital Region
  - Calgary–Edmonton Corridor
- Central Alberta
  - Calgary–Edmonton Corridor

==== Administrative divisions of Alberta ====
- Health regions of Alberta
- School authorities in Alberta

===== Census statistical divisions of Alberta =====
- Census agglomerations in Alberta
- Census divisions of Alberta
- Designated places in Alberta
- Population centres in Alberta

===== Communities of Alberta =====
- Communities in Alberta
  - Municipalities (incorporated communities) in Alberta
    - Cities in Alberta
      - Calgary
      - Edmonton
    - Improvement districts in Alberta
    - Métis settlements in Alberta
    - Municipal districts in Alberta
    - Special areas in Alberta
    - Specialized municipalities in Alberta
    - Summer villages in Alberta
    - Towns in Alberta
    - Villages in Alberta
  - Unincorporated communities in Alberta
    - Hamlets in Alberta
    - Settlements in Alberta
    - Unincorporated communities in Alberta
  - Indian reserves in Alberta

=== Demographics of Alberta ===
Demographics of Alberta

- Demographics of Calgary
- Demographics of Edmonton

== Government and politics of Alberta ==
Politics of Alberta

- Battle of Alberta – political and competitive rivalry between Edmonton and Calgary
- Capital of Alberta: Edmonton
- Form of government: Constitutional monarchy
- Elections in Alberta
- First Nations in Alberta – First Nations are the various Aboriginal peoples in Canada who are neither Inuit nor Métis
  - Indian Association of Alberta – province-wide First Nations rights organization
- Political parties in Alberta
- Political scandals of Alberta
- Taxation in Canada

=== Federal representation ===
- Senators

=== Provincial government of Alberta ===
==== Executive branch ====
- Head of state: King of Canada, King Charles III
  - Head of state's representative (viceroy): Lieutenant Governor of Alberta
    - List of lieutenant governors of Alberta
    - Head of government: Premier of Alberta
      - List of premiers of Alberta
        - List of premiers of Alberta by time in office
      - Cabinet: Executive Council of Alberta
        - Head of council: Lieutenant Governor in Council, as representative of the King
        - List of Alberta provincial ministers
- Order of precedence in Alberta
- Alberta ministries
  - Alberta International and Intergovernmental Relations

==== Legislative branch ====
- Government of Alberta, which has two components:
  - King-in-Parliament (King of Canada), represented by the Lieutenant-Governor of Alberta
    - List of lieutenant governors of Alberta
  - Legislative Assembly of Alberta
    - Speaker of the Legislative Assembly of Alberta
    - List of Alberta Legislative Assemblies
- Federal representation
  - List of Alberta senators

==== Judicial branch ====
- Court of Appeal of Alberta
  - Court of King's Bench of Alberta (superior court)
    - Provincial Court of Alberta

=== Law and order in Alberta ===
- Adult interdependent relationship in Alberta
  - Same-sex marriage in Alberta
- Capital punishment in Alberta: none.
  - Alberta, as with all of Canada, does not have capital punishment.
  - Canada eliminated the death penalty for murder on July 14, 1976.
- Constitution of Alberta
- Criminal justice system of Alberta
  - Criminal Code of Canada

==== Law enforcement in Alberta ====
- Alberta Provincial Police (defunct)

=== Military in Alberta ===
- Canadian Forces bases in Alberta
- Military in Alberta
  - Military in Calgary

=== Local government in Alberta ===
- Municipal elections in Alberta
- Municipalities in Alberta
  - Urban municipalities in Alberta
    - Cities in Alberta
    - Towns in Alberta
    - Villages in Alberta
    - Summer villages in Alberta
  - Specialized municipalities in Alberta
  - Rural municipalities in Alberta
    - Municipal districts in Alberta
    - Special areas in Alberta
    - Improvement districts in Alberta
  - Métis settlements in Alberta

== History of Alberta ==
History of Alberta

- Timeline of Alberta History
- Bibliography of Alberta history

=== History of Alberta, by period ===
- District of Alberta

=== History of Alberta, by region ===
- History of Edmonton

- Timeline of Edmonton history

- Timeline of Calgary history
- History of Red Deer, Alberta

=== History of Alberta, by subject ===
- Ghost towns in Alberta

== Culture of Alberta ==
- Architecture of Alberta
- Cuisine of Alberta
  - Canadian Chinese cuisine
- Festivals in Alberta
- Gambling in Alberta
  - Casinos and horse racing tracks in Alberta
- Historic places in Alberta
  - World Heritage Sites in Alberta
  - National Historic Sites of Canada in Alberta
  - Provincial historic sites of Alberta
- Languages of Alberta
- Museums of Alberta
- People of Alberta
  - Indigenous peoples of Alberta
    - First Nations in Alberta
    - Métis in Alberta
      - Métis Nation of Alberta
- Symbols of Alberta
  - Coat of arms of Alberta
  - Flag of Alberta
- Scouting and Guiding in Alberta

=== The arts in Alberta ===
- Music of Alberta

=== Sports in Alberta ===
- Battle of Alberta – sports and competitive rivalry between Edmonton and Calgary
- Cycling in Alberta
  - Tour of Alberta
- Curling in Alberta
  - Curling clubs in Alberta
- Golf in Alberta
  - Golf courses in Alberta
- Ice hockey in Alberta
  - Ice hockey teams in Alberta
  - Junior hockey
    - Alberta Junior Hockey League
    - Calgary Junior Hockey League
    - Calgary Junior C Hockey League
    - Capital Junior Hockey League
    - Heritage Junior B Hockey League
    - North Eastern Alberta Junior B Hockey League
    - Noralta Junior Hockey League
    - North West Junior Hockey League
  - Minor hockey
    - Alberta Midget Hockey League
- Soccer in Alberta
  - Alberta Soccer Association
  - Alberta Major Soccer League

== Economy and infrastructure of Alberta ==
- Economic rank (by nominal GDP):
- Banking in Alberta
  - Banks and credit unions in Canada
    - Bank of Alberta
- Communications in Alberta
  - List of Alberta area codes
  - Media in Alberta
    - Newspapers in Alberta
    - Radio stations in Alberta
    - Television stations in Alberta
- Currency of Alberta:
- Energy in Alberta
  - Electricity policy of Alberta
  - Electrical generating stations in Alberta
- Health care in Alberta
  - Hospitals in Alberta
  - Alberta Medical Association
- Mining in Alberta
  - Mines in Alberta
- Tourism in Alberta
- Transportation in Alberta
  - Air transport in Alberta
    - Airlines of Alberta
    - Airports in Alberta
  - Roads in Alberta
    - Provincial highways of Alberta
  - Vehicle registration plates of Alberta

== Education in Alberta ==
- Public education in Alberta
  - List of school authorities in Alberta
  - List of high schools in Alberta
- Higher education in Alberta
- Students' associations in Alberta
  - Colleges in Alberta
  - University of Alberta
    - Council of Alberta University Students
    - Presidents of the University of Alberta
    - Chancellors of the University of Alberta
    - Faculties and departments of the University of Alberta
      - University of Alberta Augustana Faculty
      - University of Alberta Faculté Saint-Jean
      - University of Alberta Faculty of Arts
      - University of Alberta Faculty of Engineering
      - University of Alberta Faculty of Extension
      - University of Alberta Faculty of Law
      - University of Alberta Faculty of Medicine and Dentistry
      - University of Alberta Faculty of Pharmacy and Pharmaceutical Sciences
    - List of University of Alberta people
      - List of University of Alberta honorary degree recipients
    - University of Alberta Hospital
    - University of Alberta Press
    - University of Alberta Protective Services
    - University of Alberta School of Business
    - University of Alberta Students' Union
  - College & Association of Registered Nurses of Alberta
  - College and Association of Respiratory Therapists of Alberta
  - College of Physicians and Surgeons of Alberta
  - Concordia University College of Alberta

== See also ==
- Index of Alberta-related articles
- List of international rankings
- Outline of geography
  - Outline of Canada
    - Outline of British Columbia
    - Outline of Manitoba
    - Outline of Nova Scotia
    - Outline of Ontario
    - Outline of Prince Edward Island
    - Outline of Quebec
    - Outline of Saskatchewan
- Provincial Archives of Alberta
- Sexual Sterilization Act of Alberta
- TUXIS Parliament of Alberta
