= AFPA =

AFPA may refer to:

- Alberta Forest Products Association, a non-profit industry association operating out of Edmonton, Alberta, Canada
- Australian Federal Police Association, a registered industrial organisation, branch of the Police Federation of Australia
- Australian Film Producers Association, now Screen Producers Australia

== See also ==
- American Forest & Paper Association, (AF&PA), the American trade association of the forest products industry
- APFA (disambiguation)
