= APFA =

APFA may refer to:

- American Professional Football Association, later the National Football League, a professional American football league that operated during 1920–1921
- American Professional Football Association, later the Midwest Football League (1935–1940), a minor professional American football league
- Association of Professional Financial Advisers, a trade association made up of financial advisers across the United Kingdom
- Association of Professional Flight Attendants, a transportation trade union in the United States
- Association for the Protection of Fur-Bearing Animals, an animal welfare organization based in Canada

== See also ==
- Professional Footballers Australia, or PFA, sometimes mistakenly referred to as APFA
- AFPA (disambiguation)
