= V4A =

V4a may refer to:

- V4α, an area of the colour centre in the brain
- Voice for Animals Humane Society (V4A), a Canadian nonprofit organisation for animals
- V4A, the postal code for Surrey, British Columbia, Canada
- V4A Heavy Trench Mortar Battery, a 4th Division artillery unit of the Australian Army in World War I
- V4A, the first ITU callsign prefix assigned to Saint Kitts and Nevis
