= Lang Wilson Practice in Architecture Culture =

Canadian architectural firm

- Company type: Private company
- Industry: Architecture, urban planning, master planning
- Founded: 1999
- Founder: Oliver Lang, Cynthia Wilson
- Headquarters: Vancouver, British Columbia, Canada
- Number of employees: 6
- Website: https://lwpac.net/

The Lang Wilson Practice in Architecture Culture (LWPAC) is an architectural firm founded in 1999 by Oliver Lang and Cynthia Wilson. It was first launched in New York City before being permanently based in Vancouver, British Columbia, where it evolved into an interdisciplinary business.

== History ==
The architectural and cultural firm delivers unified resolutions to serve innovative ideas for projects. LWPAC works on projects that are large scale; urban planning, and housing complexes, as well as small scale such as art installations.

LWPAC was co-founded by German-Canadian architect and urban entrepreneur Oliver Lang and Canadian designer and cultural entrepreneur Cindy Wilson. They have worked together in Canada, United States and Germany, to bring-forth a communal and global experience to their projects. LWPAC serves as a platform for architecture and urban design.

== Other projects ==
Sources:

- Museum of Extreme Culture – Whistler, Canada (2002)
- Colegio Chuquicamata Competition – Calama, Chile (2002)
- Dongli Lake Masterplan – Dongli Lake, China (2003)
- Westside Baptist Church – Vancouver, Canada (2004)
- Wallace – Vancouver, Canada (2008)
- Historic Precinct Height Study – Downtown Eastside, Canada (2008)
- SF House – Vancouver, Canada (2009)
- C33 PE House and LWH House – Vancouver, Canada (2010)
- Montessori School – Surrey, Canada (2011)
- NEXT Gallery – Victoria, Canada (Ongoing)

== Awards and recognition ==
- 2000 Bienal Architecture Exhibition – Santiago Chile – School of Architecture – UTFSM
- 2001 The New Vanguard – Architectural Record
- 2005 National Post – Design Exchange Award
- 2005 ACSA Faculty Design Award
- 2006 Lieutenant Governor's Innovation Award – ROAR_One
- 2006 Lieutenant Governor's Medal Architectural Institute of BC Award – ROAR_One
- 2006 Home of the Year Award – ROAR_One – Architecture Magazine New York
- 2008 Governor General's Medal in Architecture – ROAR_One
- 2010 Major Grant from Canada Council for the Arts
- 2012 Western Living Designer – Architect of the Year Award
- 2013 BC Wood Design Award – MONAD – Canadian Wood Council
- 2013 AIBC Innovation Award – MONAD
- 2014 Urban Design Award City of Vancouver – MONAD – Medium Scale Residential
- 2014 Urban Design Award City of Vancouver – MONAD – Special Jury Award Excellence and Ingenuity in Architecture
- 2016 10 Best Residences Selection – Azure Magazine – UBC Dairy Research Centre Housing
- 2016 Urban Design Award City of Vancouver – Vanglo House
- 2016 Major Research Grant – National Research Council Canada
- 2017 Lafarge Holcim Silver Award – North America – Platforms for Life
