= Expo 2017 =

International exposition in Kazakhstan

2017 Astana
- Official logo

Overview
- BIE-class: Specialized exposition
- Category: International Recognized Exhibition
- Name: Expo 2017
- Motto: Future's Energy
- Area: 25 hectares (62 acres)
- Visitors: 3,997,545
- Mascot: Saule, Kuat and Moldir

Participant(s)
- Countries: 112

Location
- Country: Kazakhstan
- City: Astana
- Coordinates: 51°05′28.5″N 71°24′46.1″E

Timeline
- Bidding: July 1, 2010
- Awarded: November 22, 2012
- Opening: June 10, 2017
- Closure: September 10, 2017

Specialized expositions
- Previous: Expo 2012 in Yeosu
- Next: Expo 2027 in Belgrade

Universal expositions
- Previous: Expo 2015 in Milan
- Next: Expo 2020 in Dubai

Horticultural expositions
- Previous: Expo 2016 in Antalya
- Next: Expo 2019 in Beijing

Internet
- Website: www.expo2017astana.com/en/

Expo 2017 Astana was an International Exposition which took place from June 10 to September 10, 2017, in Astana, Kazakhstan. The expo's theme was "Future Energy", and aimed to create a global debate between countries, nongovernmental organizations, companies and the general public on the crucial question: "How do we ensure safe and sustainable access to energy for all while reducing CO_{2} emissions?"

== Theme ==
The theme chosen for the Expo 2017 was "Future Energy". The theme was aimed to concentrate on the future of energy, and on innovative and practical energy solutions and their impacts.

The Expo 2017's subtitle was "Solutions for Tackling Humankind’s Greatest Challenge." Therefore, the Expo showcased future energy solutions tackling social, economic and environmental challenges.

== Preparation ==
On November 22, 2012, Astana was chosen by the Bureau International des Expositions (BIE) as the venue to host Expo 2017. Astana received 103 votes from the BIE General Assembly, surpassing the other candidate, Liège, Belgium, which received 44. Other candidates for Expo 2017 had included two Canadian proposals, Expo 17 in Montreal and Edmonton Expo 2017, both of which were withdrawn before the BIE vote.

It was the first time that a major international exhibition of this kind was hosted in a country from the former Soviet Union. More than 100 countries and 10 international organizations were expected to participate. Around 2-3 million people were expected to visit the international pavilions from June to September 2017.

25 hectares (62 acres) was planned for the pavilions of Expo 2017. The site has a convenient access to Astana's city center, the international airport and the railway station. The Expo Site is also linked with a network of Kazakhstan's inter-city roads to ensure a quick access from all the country. Construction of the pavilions began in April 2014 with 20 companies from Kazakhstan and 49 companies from around the globe.

Nur Alem itself is located in the epicenter of technological innovation, where young investors can develop start-up projects, research scientific inventions and implement their business ideas.

Designs were considered for the grounds of Expo 2017 from architects in the UK, USA, Germany, Austria, Netherlands and China. But the lead design contract was awarded to Chicago-based Adrian Smith + Gordon Gill Architecture.

On April 24, 2014, the President of Kazakhstan Nursultan Nazarbayev took part in a capsule-laying ceremony of the Astana Expo 2017 Exhibition Center construction in Astana, which will be located near the Nazarbayev University.

Astana submitted its registration bid to the BIE in December 2013, as planned.

On June 13, 2015, the chief executive officer of Astana Expo 2017 organization committee, Talgat Yermegiyaev, was indicted for corruption. The new CEO is Astana mayor Adilbek Zhaksybekov.

Kazakhstan's largest airline, Air Astana, was named the "Official Air Carrier of Expo 2017”.

In preparation for the Expo 2017 the administration of Astana launched several "smart city" projects. The projects imply introduction of digital technologies in such areas as payment, education and healthcare.

The Energy Best Practices Area (eBPA) Pavilion at Expo 2017 showcased the 17 best energy-generating projects. These projects were selected from 136 submitted from more than 25 countries.

== Construction ==
Over 100 companies, including Zaha Hadid Architects, UNStudio, Snøhetta, HOK, and Coop Himmelb(l)au, participated in a competition to design the grounds of Expo 2017. Chicago firm Adrian Smith + Gordon Gill Architecture (AS+GG) won the competition for the design idea. The main project, according to the design was realised by Swiss company IT-Engineering.

Several national and international construction companies were awarded contracts to build the grounds. The main contractor Mabetex Group, and Sembol, CC Bazis-A LLC, ABK Kurylys-1 LLC, Turquaz-YDA Story LLC, Sredazenergostry LLC have completed the construction part. The financing of project is done by the Kazakhstan Government and some private investor like Plast Invest Production LLP, Sonik Company LLP, PolimerMetal-T LLP and Alyugal LLP.

== Participation ==
The number of countries that confirmed their participation in Expo 2017 by September 2016 reached 101, which is higher than anticipated.

U.S. Secretary of Energy Ernest Moniz and Assistant Secretary of State for South and Central Asian Affairs Nisha Biswal announced in November 2016 at the Embassy of Kazakhstan in Washington, D.C. that APCO Worldwide, a global communications consultancy, was selected as the chief organizing partner for the U.S. Pavilion at EXPO 2017. The USA Pavilion in Astana was organized and operated by a U.S. private-sector company. However, traditionally it is managed solely by the U.S. Department of State. The official theme of the USA Pavilion is “The Source of Infinite Energy”. The USA Pavilion worked to inspire the next generation of ambassadors.

115 states and 22 international organizations confirmed their participation in EXPO 2017 in Astana. This turnout exceeded the organizing company's expectations of 100 countries and 10 international organizations. Since June 10 through September 9, the EXPO-2017 International Specialized Exhibition was visited by over 3,86 million people. The average daily attendance amounted to 22,840 visits.

=== Participating countries ===
Participating countries (green), with Kazakhstan, the host country, colored red.

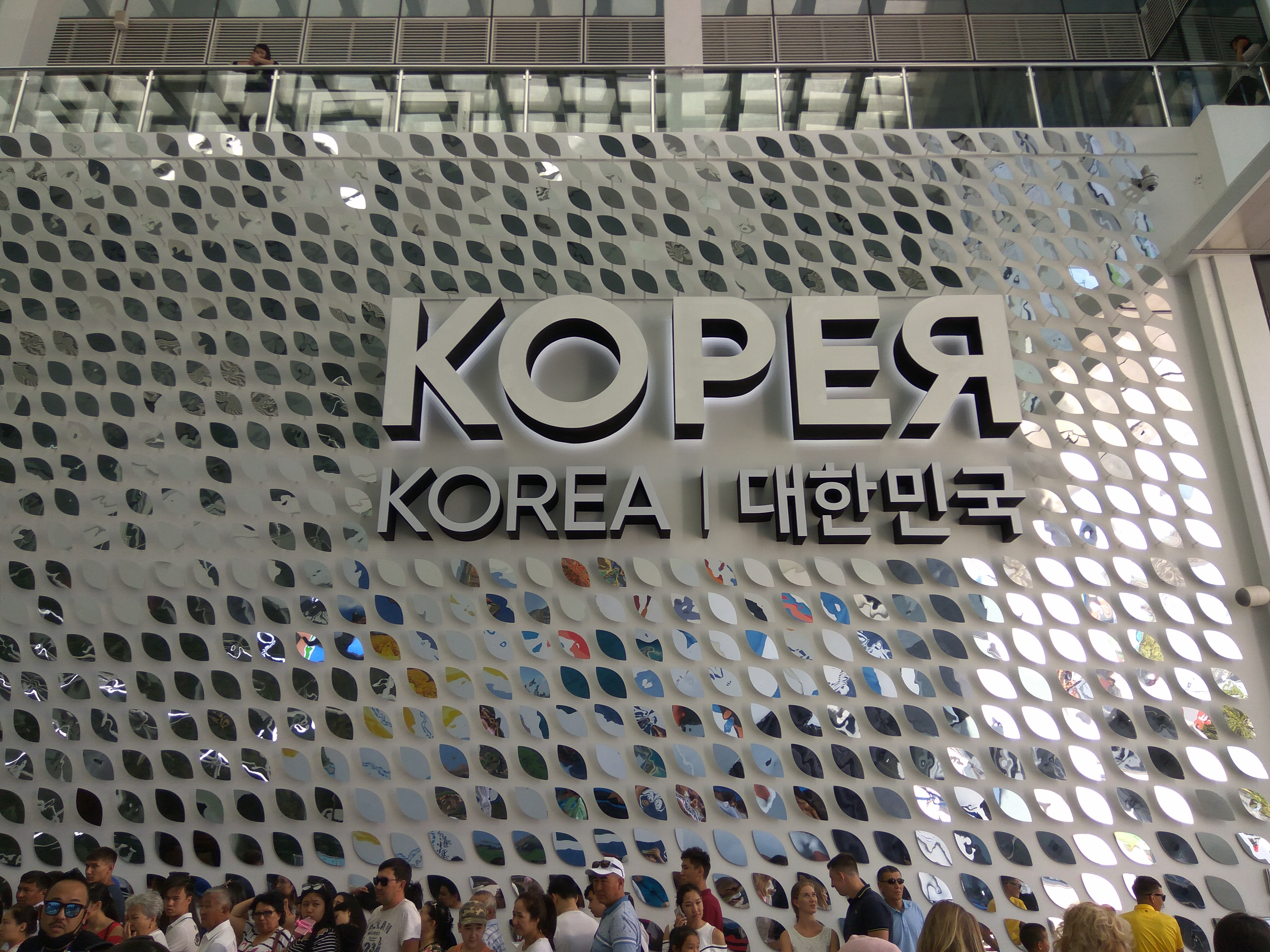
Republic of Korea Pavilion

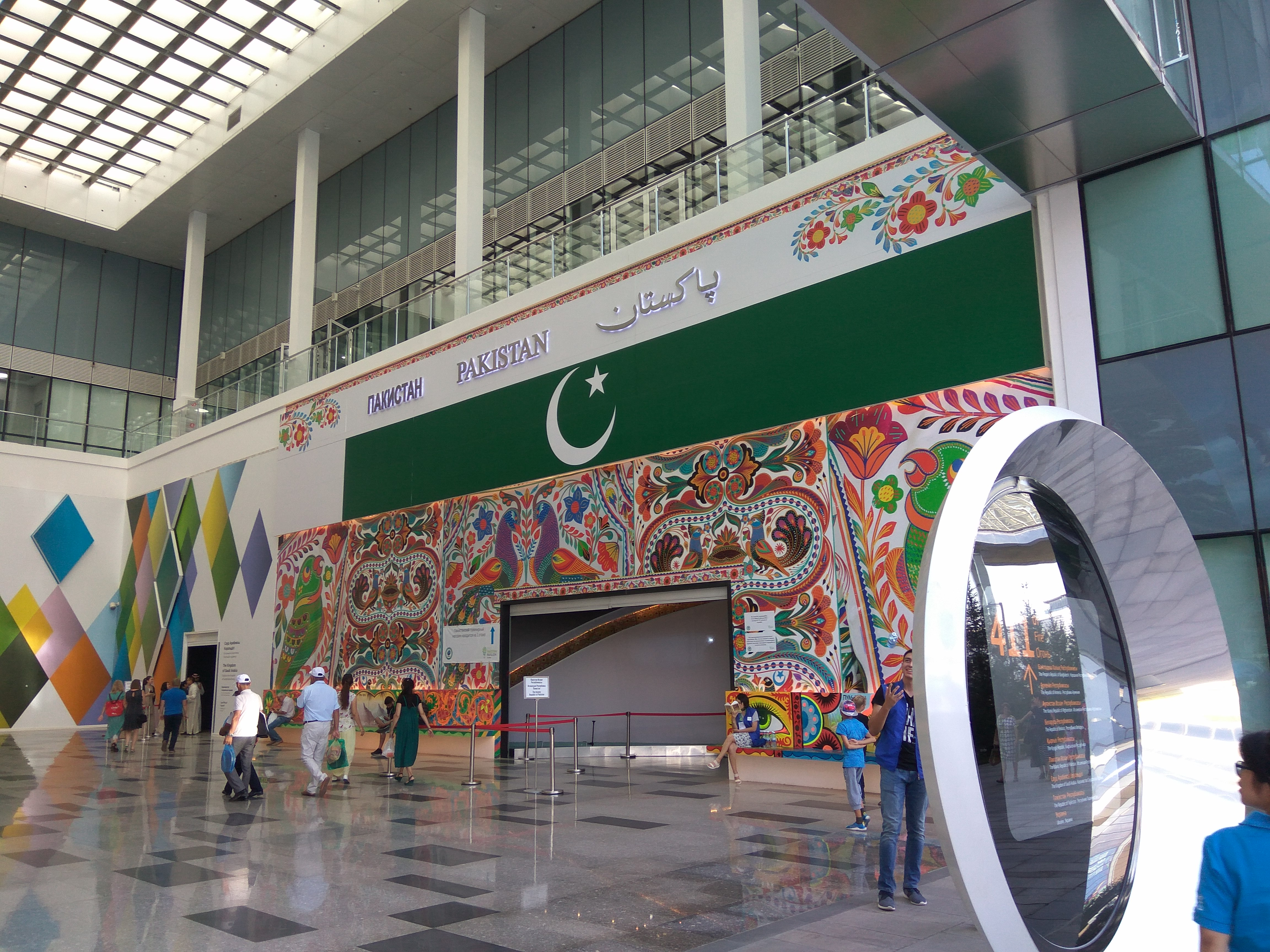
Pakistan Pavilion entrance

The countries who participated in Expo 2017 were:

- Afghanistan
- Algeria
- Angola
- Antigua and Barbuda
- Argentina
- Armenia
- Austria
- Azerbaijan
- Bangladesh
- Barbados
- Belarus
- Belgium
- Belize
- Benin
- Bolivia
- Burkina Faso
- Central African Republic
- Chile
- China
- Comoros
- Democratic Republic of the Congo
- Republic of the Congo
- Costa Rica
- Cuba
- Czech Republic
- Djibouti
- Dominica
- Dominican Republic
- Ecuador
- Egypt
- Ethiopia
- Fiji
- Finland
- France: France confirmed its participation on 9 April 2015. It had a large pavilion, with a floor area of 1083 m^{2}. France has, in the past, organised eight international exhibitions.
- Gabon
- Gambia
- Georgia
- Germany
- Ghana
- Greece
- Grenada
- Guatemala
- Guinea
- Guyana
- Haiti
- Honduras
- Hungary
- India
- Iran: Iran confirmed its participation in November 2015.
- Israel
- Italy
- Jamaica
- Japan
- Jordan: Jordanian Montasser al-Oklahoma confirmed country's participation on 3 November 2015.
- Kazakhstan (host)
- Kenya
- Kiribati
- Kyrgyzstan
- Latvia
- Lesotho
- Liberia
- Lithuania
- Luxembourg
- Madagascar
- Malaysia
- Marshall Islands
- Mauritania
- Mexico
- Monaco
- Mongolia
- Nauru
- Netherlands: On 2 December 2015, Ambassador of the Netherlands in Kazakhstan Hans Driesser signed an agreement on participation.
- Pakistan
- Palau
- Papua New Guinea
- Paraguay
- Poland
- Romania
- Russia whose pavilion won a gold medal
- Saint Kitts and Nevis
- Saint Lucia
- Saint Vincent and the Grenadines
- Samoa
- Saudi Arabia
- Serbia
- Senegal
- Seychelles
- Sierra Leone
- Singapore
- Slovakia
- South Africa
- South Korea
- Solomon Islands
- Spain
- Sri Lanka
- Suriname
- Switzerland
- Thailand
- Tajikistan
- Tonga
- Turkmenistan
- Turkey
- Tuvalu
- Uganda
- Ukraine
- United Arab Emirates
- United Kingdom
- United States
- Uzbekistan
- Vanuatu
- Vatican City
- Venezuela
- Vietnam
- Yemen

=== Corporate participation ===
Multinational corporations who sponsored Expo 2017, were Samsung, Cisco Systems, and Shell. Kazakh sponsors include NCOC, Air Astana, JSC Kazkommertsbank, JSC Samruk Energy, and JSC Kazpochta.

Expo 2017 attracted €125 million in sponsorships from large international companies. The sponsors of Expo 2017 included Samsung, Shell, Chevron and others.

APCO Worldwide won the bid to manage the USA Pavilion that was spirited with the theme "Infinite Energy".

=== International organizations ===
Astana Expo 2017 and UN World Tourism Organization signed a memorandum of cooperation. The memorandum envisions organizing a joint conference on “Tourism and the Energy of the Future” in late June during the exposition. International organizations that confirmed their participation in Expo 2017 also include the International Renewable Energy Agency (IRENA), an intergovernmental organization headquartered in Abu Dhabi.

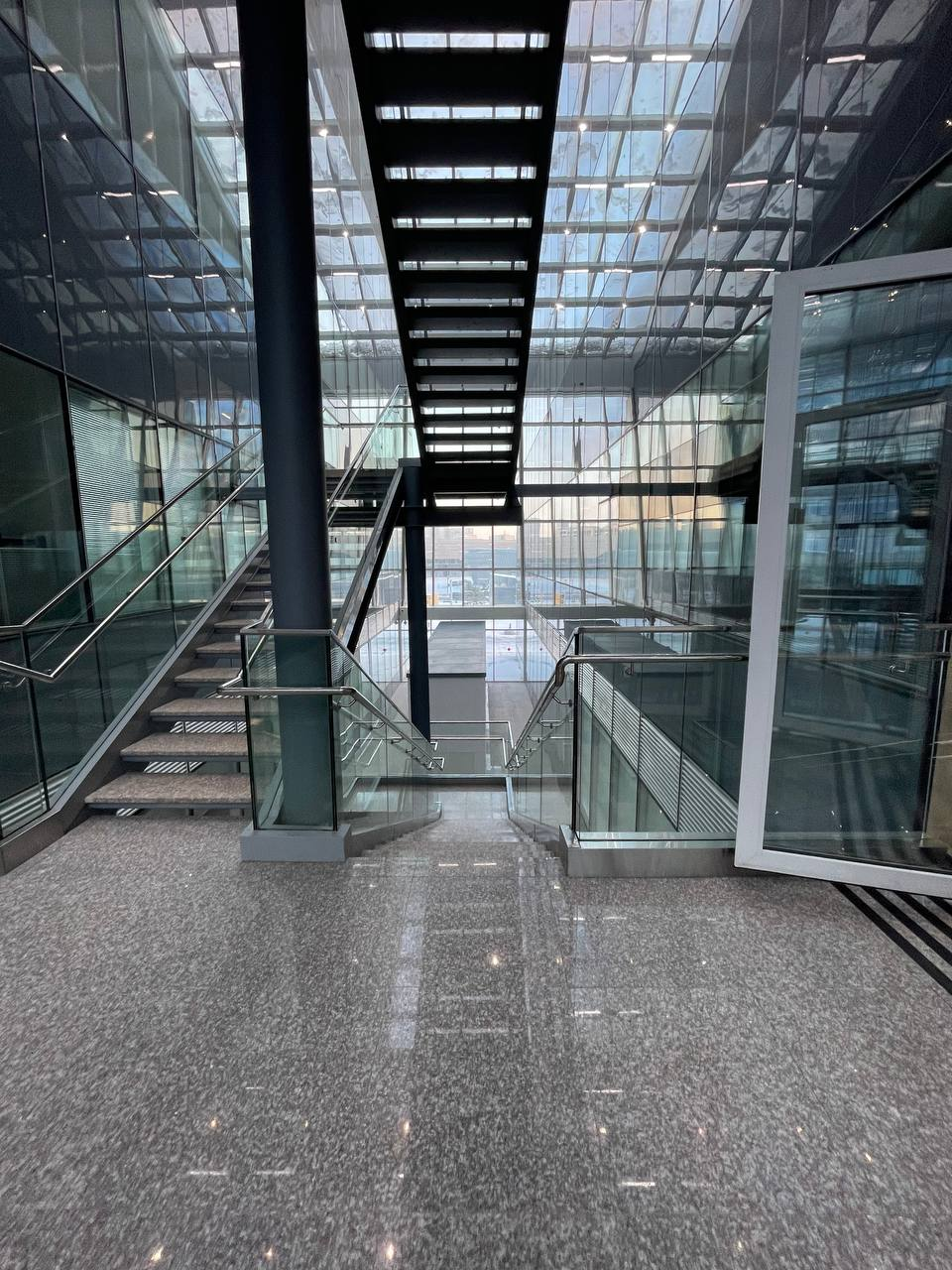
IT University

And 2 years after the international exhibition, a new IT university was opened on the territory of EXPO-2017, which was named "Astana IT University". The higher educational institution has occupied one of the EXPO pavilions, where at the moment they train qualified personnel in the field of IT technologies. The language of instruction at the university is English. The higher educational institution includes 8 educational programs, which were joined in 2020 by the 9th - Digital Journalism. The list of educational programs from 2020 is as follows: Software Engineering, Big data analysis, Computer science, Industrial automation, Media technologies, Cybersecurity, Telecommunication systems, IT Management and Digital journalism. The state annually provides the university with targeted state grants that are distributed among applicants based on the results of the Unified National Testing. In the state competition grants, it is necessary to select a group of educational programs for an identical combination of core subjects of the Unified National Testing, and for the educational program "Digital Journalism" the results of creative exams and 2 subjects of the Unified National Testing (reading literacy and history of Kazakhstan) are taken into account. Also, the EXPO 2017 pavilion has allocated a modern residential complex, equipped as a student house for nonresident students.

=== Ambassador for Expo 2017 ===
In March 2016, unified middleweight boxing world champion Gennady Golovkin became an official ambassador for Astana Expo 2017. Gennady Golovkin is originally from Karaganda, Kazakhstan.

== Post-Expo use ==
The Kazakhstan Pavilion and Science Museum (Nur Alem), now the Museum of Future Energy

The Expo 2017 grounds and pavilion space have been converted into commercial space for corporate, startups, education and research entities. The anchor tenant of the converted Expo grounds is the Astana International Financial Centre. The AIFC governor has suggested the facilities could be home to blockchain and concurrency technology companies and startups.

== Host selection ==
On 1 July 2010, during the 147th session of the General Assembly of the BIE, held in Paris, Kazakhstan announced its intention to participate in the bidding process to host the International Specialized Exhibition at Astana in 2017, hence giving cities with counter-bids six months to respond. One other candidate city applied: Liège in Belgium. The winning candidate was selected by the BIE on 22 November 2012 in Paris.

=== Candidate cities ===
The following cities bid to host Expo 2017:

City	Country	Theme
Astana	Kazakhstan	Future Energy
Liège	Belgium	Connecting the World, Linking People, Better Living Together

=== Cities that did not bid ===
The following cities had considered bidding to host Expo 2017:

City	Country
Belgrade	Serbia
Edmonton (see Edmonton Expo 2017)	Canada
Lille	France
Newcastle	Australia
Salamanca	Spain
Stavanger	Norway
Sydney	Australia

=== Astana candidacy ===
The city of Astana, which won the UNESCO Cities for Peace award, is the capital of Kazakhstan. It applied to host the International Exposition in 2017 on 10 June 2011 through Rapil Jochibayev, head of project coordination. The official presentation of the city's application took place during the 149th General Meeting of the Bureau International des Expositions.

On 10 June 2012, the country launched its promotional campaign to support the candidacy of Astana.

The city of Astana suggested the topic of "Future Energy. Action for global sustainability" as the exhibition's theme. During the symposium on Astana's candidacy, the BIE Secretary General, Vincente Gonzales Loscertales, declared:

Energy is one of RIO+20’s seven critical issues and the topic of Astana Expo gives the opportunity to gather several suggestions. Five years after RIO+20’s, Astana could represent an ideal step towards the assessment in 2012 of some of the commitments that were made…

As an element of the campaign held to support the candidacy of Astana, the committee shot the film Astana Expo 2017. "The Great Expectation of Kazakhstan". The video was awarded the Silver Dolphin prize of the Cannes Corporate Media & TV Awards on October, in the " corporate videos " category.

On June 15, 2013, the French government and solar energy partners in France teamed up with the Expo 2017 organizing committee to sponsor the Sun Trip. 35 bikers from around Europe, North America, and Kazakhstan traveled on solar powered bicycles from the outskirts of Paris to Astana in two months to show the world that solar energy is viable source of power.

=== Liège candidacy ===
The city of Liège, the heart of Belgium's third largest conurbation (600,000 inhabitants), is the economic capital of Wallonia.

Over ten years, it has rolled out a redevelopment strategy. The city and the conurbation are undergoing redevelopment with the aim of creating a service economy focusing on centres of excellence.

The policy of ambitious structuring projects, orchestrated by the public authorities and supported by businesses, universities and institutes, is giving the Liege region a new lease of life. While awaiting the arrival of the tram, a scheme initiated by the Walloon Government, several major projects are underway: the Royal Opera of Wallonia, an institution with an international reputation, is being restored; the Museum of Modern and Contemporary Art will be transformed into an International Centre of Art and Culture, etc.

The impacts of this strategy are that the City of Liege attracts new inhabitants; it has reclaimed its position as Wallonia's main tourist destination; Liege airport ranks eighth in Europe for freight transport (1st in Belgium), the autonomous port of Liege is the biggest Belgian inland port and the third European port in terms of transported tonnage.

The district is also the seat of world-renowned companies, such as AB InBev, Mittal, Umicore, FN Herstal, Techspace Aero, EVS Broadcast, Amos or Eurogentec. Most of them have prompted the emergence of competence clusters in areas in which Liege excels: aeronautics, the metalworking industry and mechanics, space, biotechnologies, information technologies, or again, agrifood.

The city aims to build on this momentum to organise an event with an international scope which would constitute the significant achievement of the economic and urban reconversion strategy of the Liege Region.

Holding an International Expo in Liege in 2017 would have offered an opportunity to:

- showcase Belgium's strengths and success stories in the economic, scientific and cultural arenas;
- put Belgium, its Regions and Communities on the world map for all the right reasons;
- symbolise the success of the industrial and urban reconversion of the Liege Region.

=== Candidates in North America ===
In North America, at least four cities and organizations in Canada proposed staging an international exposition in 2017 to coincide with the Canada's 150th anniversary of confederation. Due to Canada's previous experiences with Expo 67 and Expo 86, and the fact North America has not staged an expo since 1986, it was generally believed among promoters that Canada would stand a good chance of winning an expo in 2017.

The earliest concerted initiative—for an expo to be staged in Montreal—was launched by Vancouver-based NGO Expo 17 Inc, which released a 51-page proposal tailored to Montreal's existing Vision 2025 report put together by the Société du Havre. The Expo 17 proposal (and web site) strongly advocated Canadian unity and social/environmental sustainability. Specifics of the proposal included "saving the Saint Lawrence River" and revisiting the Habitat 67 housing concept that had featured as a prototype for Expo 67. The proposal suggested staging up to three smaller expos (recognized, horticultural and housing expos) to achieve maximum impact and attendance. The proposal and web site were launched in 2007 on the 40th anniversary of Expo 67. The Expo 17 group, after announcing its withdrawal from Montreal, committed itself to promoting alternative sesquicentennial events, particularly of pronounced social and environmental value.

The cities of Ottawa and Hamilton, Ontario explored the possibility of an expo in 2017, but declined to submit a proposal to the Department of Canadian Heritage.

In the spring of 2009, the Department of Canadian Heritage, informed cities in Canada that any interest in staging an Expo in 2017 would have to be expressed with a Letter of Intent before May 29, 2009 followed by a full proposal no later than November 30, 2009. Ottawa, Hamilton and Montreal declined while Edmonton, with a bid proposal already prepared, decided to push forward. Albertan rival Calgary also submitted a letter of intent in late May just before the filing deadline, surprising the Edmonton bid committee and igniting intra-provincial tensions. Calgary decided not to proceed with a full proposal, deciding instead to invest in alternative ways to improve the city. Being the only remaining candidate, Edmonton was granted the sole Canadian right to bid for Expo 2017 internationally.

==== Edmonton bid ====
A high-level feasibility study was first conducted for Edmonton Expo 2017 in 2007 but the proposal moved further towards serious consideration after city representatives visited Expo 2008 (a recognized expo) in Zaragoza, Spain. On October 29, 2008, Edmonton City Council approved pursuing this next step on the condition of Government of Alberta support and cost-sharing. Themes suggested for Edmonton such as "A New Silk Road: Trade and Commerce", championed by MLA Gary Mar and city councillor Mike Nickel, indicating a commercial approach, but the proposed expo later decided to shift the focus to energy and environmental concerns, with the theme "Harmony of Energy and Our Future Planet".

The bid organizers estimated costs to total C$2.3 billion to be funded by municipal, provincial and federal governments as well as private sector sponsorship. News broke on November 22, 2010, that the federal government had declined to approve funds for the Expo – estimated at C$706 million, stating that the project was far too expensive and financially risky. Edmonton's mayor Stephen Mandel was shocked and said "I've never been as mad at anything and just so disappointed in the lack of vision of a government… This decision is frankly wrong and extremely short-sighted". The lack of federal funding effectively ended Edmonton's bid for Expo 2017.

== See also ==
- Expo 17
- Edmonton EXPO 2017
