= Expo 17 =

Canadian non-profit organization

The logo of Expo 17 with "Earth, Fire, Water and Air" theme colours.

Expo 17 was a Canadian non-profit organization founded in 2005 to promote an international exposition, or world's fair, to celebrate the sesquicentennial of Canada in 2017. In 2007, the organization publicly unveiled a 51-page proposal, in French and English for a "hybrid" expo, named Expo 17, to be staged on the southwest shore and the two islands originally created for Expo 67, in the city of Montreal, Quebec. In an unofficial capacity, the historic section of Old Montreal was also included in the expo plan—as an entirely car-free "buffer" zone.

== Proposal ==
The original "Expo 17" proposal attempted to analyze and address flagging interest and attendance experienced by the most recent world's fairs. Citing an expo's theme—or purpose—and its ability to portray, as well as resolve, modern humanity's most pressing concerns as paramount to success, the proposal recommended sweeping social and environmental initiatives. It also suggested the implementation of city- and province-wide energy efficiency programs to reduce the unusually high consumption of electricity in Quebec, thereafter selling the resulting surplus to help finance the exposition. Other financing suggestions included overhauling Montreal's taxation system to allow for the creation of positive financial incentives for citizens who strive to save energy, and increased costs for those who do not.

Perhaps most novel was the suggestion of a "hybrid" world's fair composed of a BIE-sanctioned "recognized" exposition, a horticultural exposition, and a housing ("Habitat 2017") exposition. This was apparently due to the fact that in 2017, only a very small "recognized" expo would be permitted by the Bureau of International Expositions (BIE)—the Paris-based body which governs world's fairs. By holding three smaller expos simultaneously, a city could ostensibly stage a relatively sizeable exposition with a greater degree of flexibility, yet less cost (apparently), than a single larger ("universal") expo such as Expo 67. The proposal also states that the housing and horticultural aspects would be jointly financed through public-private partnerships. Lastly, the proposed housing expo, "Habitat 2017", in order to address the disappearance of young families from increasingly unaffordable urban centres (the "demographic time bomb"), borrows heavily from the original "Habitat 67" urban residential concept introduced by architect Moshe Safdie for Expo 67.

Following the World Urban Forum 3 in Vancouver in 2006, a special addendum which further addressed social initiatives was added to the proposal, but not publicly unveiled.

== Reactions ==
On April 28, 2007—the 40th anniversary of the opening of Expo 67, copies of the proposal were delivered to the office of Gérald Tremblay, mayor of Montreal. Soon thereafter, the proposal and the "Expo 17" web site were publicly unveiled. Though public reaction was generally positive, including outside of Quebec, the mayor's office rejected the idea, citing concern for basic infrastructure and Montreal's potholed streets as more pressing priorities. Expo 17 executive director Richard Barham publicly admitted that an official endorsement was not expected, and that the organization's goal would be to concentrate on grass-roots support before getting the mayor more directly involved. In the spring of 2009, however, the Department of Canadian Heritage, through the Federation of Canadian Municipalities, requested a "letter of intent" from all cities within Canada interested in staging an expo in 2017. Cities had approximately six weeks to reply. Thereafter, in November the same year, interested cities would be required to submit a full bid proposal. Only Edmonton and Calgary (Alberta) replied in the affirmative. Montreal, despite last-minute talks with the Expo 17 organization, declined. Calgary, after a brief period, also withdrew its bid, making Edmonton the only city in Canada allowed to submit an expo bid to the BIE in Paris.

== Aftermath ==
Soon before the 2011 federal election, Ottawa's support for Edmonton's expo bid was withdrawn, despite official backing from the province. Edmonton Mayor Stephen Mandel accused Stephen Harper's conservative party of taking Alberta's traditionally conservative vote for granted, calling the decision "frankly wrong and extremely short-sighted." Mandel also claimed Ottawa had encouraged the bid, yet did not give the city a chance to change it before cancelling support.

Expo 17 regrouped in 2009 to concentrate on alternative projects for Canada's sesquicentennial.

== See also ==
- Edmonton Expo 2017
- Expo 2017
