= Clean Scene =

Canadian charity

- Industry: Rehabilitation

Clean Scene Network for Youth Society operating as Clean Scene is a registered charity located in Edmonton, Alberta, Canada. Its activities consist mainly of drug abuse education, seminars, and motivational speaking on the subject of drug abuse. Generally, presentations are made to schools or organizations, and are targeted for junior high and high school students. Clean Scene Network for Youth has within its mandate to refer youth to addiction treatment as well.

A new program that is currently in development with contribution funding by Health Canada's Drug Strategy is called Clean Scene Peer Clubs and is a peer support program for schools with substance abuse problems.

Clean Scene was founded in 2002 by Mike Ryan.
