= Inspiring Education: A Dialogue with Albertans =

Alberta Conversation Locations
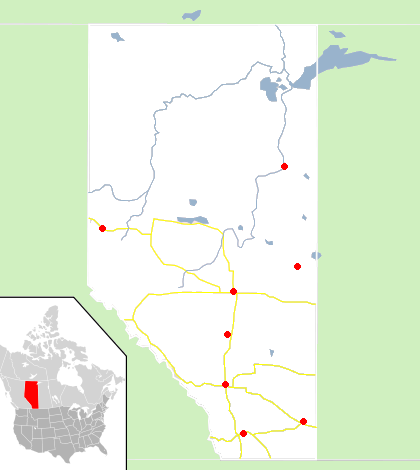
- Locations Visited for Spring Conversations in Alberta

Spring Conversations
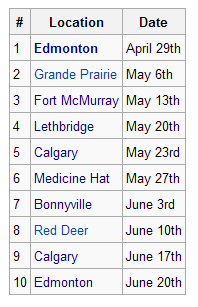
- Location and Date of Spring Conversations

Inspiring Education: A Dialogue with Albertans is an initiative enacted in 2009 by the Minister of Education of Alberta, Canada, David Hancock and Alberta Education to encourage discussion relating to building a long-term education framework focusing on values, goals, and processes.

== Description ==
One of the primary objectives of the project is to reach a clear understanding of what it will mean to be an "Educated Albertan" in the year 2029, and to create a policy framework for that 20-year time period. The dialogue is based on five key values identified from the government caucus – opportunity, fairness, citizenship, choice and diversity. The policy of public engagement highlighted as the foundation of the project was influenced by the concept of Dialogic learning, as well as a number of other sources.

The two committees responsible for supporting the Inspiring Education initiative are the "Steering Committee" and the "Working Committee." The purpose of the Steering Committee is, "to guide and act as ambassadors for the project." These members are also designated as the public authors of the broad outlines of a policy framework resulting from the dialogue. The Working Committee will support the Steering Committee and the Ministry of Education in creating this framework, and are responsible for providing regular updates on progress made.

=== Phase One ===
Phase one of the dialogue occurred in winter and spring 2009. This phase focused on both online and face-to-face conversation methods and was highlighted by 10 sessions held in eight different locations throughout Alberta. An estimated 1,000 people participated in these 10 conversation sessions, designed to include a wide demographic representation. One-third of the participants were invited stakeholders, one-third self-invitees, and one-third random selections.

=== Phase Two ===
Phase two takes the data collected in phase one and focus on three key streams; vision and values, policy, and governance. This information will be taken under consideration in the creation of a new policy/governance framework. In addition, this phase also included a three-day event from October 18 to October 20, 2009; the "Inspiring Education Fall Forum." Topics discussed at the forum were heavily influenced by the themes that surfaced during the 10 previous community conversations. Speakers at the conference included:

- Cultural Anthropologist - Jennifer James.
- President and CEO, Catalyze Learning International - Mark Milliron
- Author - Daniel H. Pink
- President and Vice-Chancellor of the University of Alberta - Indira Samarasekera

Approximately 1,000 people participated in the October event, with 350 more registered for simultaneous online participation.

== Phase Three ==
Phase three of the project is the period of time after the fall forum where the input is collected, processed, and utilized in the creation of a report by the Steering Committee, for the Minister of Education.

== Phase Four ==
Phase four is projected to be the time period where the new framework is completed and revealed.
