= Association of Professional Financial Advisers =

- Abbreviation: APFA
- Formation: 1999
- Legal status: Not-for-profit organisation
- Headquarters: London
- Region served: UK
- Website: www.apfa.net

The Association of Professional Financial Advisers or APFA is a trade association made up of financial advisers across the United Kingdom. It is currently chaired by Lord Deben.

== History ==
APFA formed in 1999 as the Association of Independent Financial Advisers or AIFA. They formed under the basis from a proposal that there would be a single trade association to represent independent financial advisers. Lord Hunt of Wirral was at the chair of the body until his resignation in 2002. He was replaced in 2003 by John Gummer MP, who was awarded a peerage in the 2010 Dissolution Honours List.

== Renaming ==
In November 2012, the association changed its name from Association of Independent Financial Advisers to Association of Professional Financial Advisers. The change was ratified following a vote at the organisation’s annual general meeting, and meant that APFA from then on would represent financial advisers who are independent or restricted. The decision was taken so it would enable APFA to continue representing members affected by the rule changes in the Retail Distribution Review.

== Structure ==
APFA has a membership of financial advisers for whom they represent. Members are also invited to join the APFA Council. The APFA Council discusses policy issues and acts as a platform of discussion between the organisation and its membership.

In 2003 the Association of Mortgage Intermediaries or AMI was formed as a subsidiary company of the then AIFA. There was a subsequent split in 2012 whereby they both became individual entities.

== Function ==
The Association of Professional Financial Advisers specialises in the financial services sector. It represents the collective interests of its membership. The association campaigns in the interest of the financial adviser community and lobbies regulators and the government both at a national and a European level.

== See also ==
- Independent financial adviser
