= Edmonton Expo 2017 =

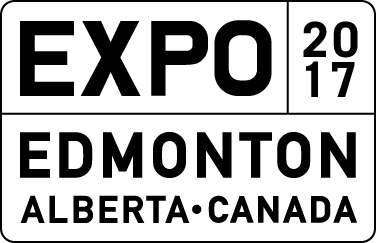
Edmonton Expo 2017 visual ID

Edmonton mayor Stephen Mandel at the November 2009 press event announcing the intention to submit a bid to host an Expo in 2017.

Edmonton Expo 2017 was a proposed bid to host an Expo in 2017 in the city of Edmonton, Alberta, Canada, during the sesquicentennial of Canada.

== Bid details ==
In 2007, the City of Edmonton began a high-level assessment of a bid to host an expo in 2017 or 2020. A citizen committee comprising 40 community and business leaders participated in developing a conceptual report. The findings of the report suggest that there are sufficient and compelling reasons to proceed with developing a national bid and business plan for an expo in 2017.

On October 29, 2008, Edmonton City Council approved pursuing this next step on the condition of Government of Alberta support and cost-sharing.

City Council voted unanimously on April 15, 2009, to release funding for the project's 2009 phase: building a national bid and business case, which involved conducting feasibility studies and reviews of the viability and costs of holding an expo, consulting Edmontonians, evaluating potential sites and financing formulas, and developing a theme.

In spring of 2009, the Government of Canada's Department of Canadian Heritage, through the Federation of Canadian Municipalities, distributed a request to Canadian cities to express their intent to bid on an EXPO in 2017. By May 29, 2009, Edmonton, Alberta and Calgary, Alberta formally expressed its intent to submit a national bid on November 30, 2009. Other Canadian cities that had expressed interest earlier did not formally express their intent to the Government of Canada by May 29.

On July 20, 2009, the national bid received funding from the Government of Alberta. "An event like this provides a platform to celebrate the uniqueness and vibrancy of our capital city and province," said Lindsay Blackett, Minister of Culture and Community Spirit. "I wish the City of Edmonton all the best in its bid preparations."

On November 2, 2009, Calgary withdrew its intent to bid on an expo in 2017. At the end of the month, Edmonton submitted its bid to the Government of Alberta and Government of Canada.

On May 13, 2010, Alberta Premier Ed Stelmach announced that the Government of Alberta would support the international bid for Expo 2017. "We are certainly supporting Edmonton, the business community with its bid. I think it's the kind of energy and optimism that should be supported by the province," said Stelmach. "Should we be successful, there are three levels of government that will be expected to contribute," he added.

News broke on November 22, 2010, that the federal government had declined to issue funds for the expo, effectively killing the bid.

== Reception ==
The bid was criticized by the Canadian Taxpayers Federation for being excessively costly, calling it "a terrible idea".

In a survey conducted in the summer of 2009, 83% of Albertans and Canadians supported an Edmonton bid.

== See also ==
- World's fair
- Bureau of International Expositions
- Expo 17
