= Carriage Lane Estates =

- Unincorporated community (Population centre)
- Location of Carriage Lane Estates in Alberta
- Coordinates: 55.178°N 118.725°W
- Country: Canada
- Province: Alberta
- Census division: No. 19
- Municipal district: County of Grande Prairie No. 1

Government
  - Type: Unincorporated
  - Reeve: Leanne Beaupre
  - Governing body: County of Grande Prairie No. 1 Council: Leanne Beaupre; Corey Beck; Daryl Beeston; Harold Bulford; Peter Harris; Bob Marshall; Karen Rosvold; Ross Sutherland; Linda Dianne Waddy

Area
  - Land: 1.34 km^{2} (0.52 sq mi)

Population (2021)
  - Total: 1,094
- Time zone: UTC−06:00 (Alberta Time)

Carriage Lane Estates is an unincorporated urban community within the County of Grande Prairie No. 1 in northwest Alberta, Canada that is designated a population centre for statistical purposes in the Canadian census. The community is adjacent to the eastern boundary of the City of Grande Prairie at the intersection of Township Road 714 (100 Avenue) and Range Road 54.

== History ==
The community of Carriage Lane Estates was approved for development by the County of Grande Prairie No. 1 on December 6, 2004 through its adoption of the Carriage Lane Estates Area Structure Plan (ASP). The ASP estimates a population of 2,191 at full build-out.

== Demographics ==
In the 2021 Census of Population, Carriage Lane Estates recorded a population of 1,094 living in 321 of its 336 total private dwellings, a change of 8.5% from its 2016 population of 1,008. With a land area of 1.34 km^{2} (0.52 sq mi), it had a population density of 816.4/km^{2} (2,114.5/sq mi) in 2021.
