= Alberta Forest Products Association =

The Alberta Forest Products Association, or AFPA, is a non-profit industry association operating out of Edmonton, Alberta, Canada. The AFPA represents a majority of forest products companies operating in the province of Alberta that manufacture dimensional lumber, plywood, oriented strand board, pulp and newsprint, and other secondary, value-added products. The AFPA is governed by a board of directors, made up of representatives from member companies, and supported by staff based in Edmonton, Alberta.

The AFPA is the primary lumber certification agency in Alberta, responsible for ensuring the quality control of each piece of stamped lumber originating from its members.

== History ==
The AFPA was established in 1942 by a group of lumber brokers to coordinate efforts in dealing with the problems in the Alberta forest industry - which in those days was essentially lumber producers. In 1950, the AFPA prepared the first marketing booklet for "Western White Spruce" lumber as "Spruce-Pine-Fir" (SPF), for distribution to buyers in the United States and Canada. At the same time the association urged the Alberta provincial government to increase forest fire protection and help reduce Alberta's high timber loss by fire. The AFPA also established its own lumber grading mark using the western white pine association (WWPA) grade rules.

In 1959, the AFPA joined the then Canadian Wood Development Council, now the Canadian Wood Council, (http://www.cwc.ca/) as a charter member. This affiliation was timely as the United States Federal Housing Authority had announced that all lumber imported into the United States must be grade marked, and the Canadian federal government followed suit with the same requirements by CMHC.

The AFPA became a registered entity under the Society Act of Alberta in 1959, and a registered trademark in the United States in that same year. It also became a registered trademark in Canada, in 1962.

== Work Wild program ==
In January 2011, the AFPA launched the Work Wild program, a campaign that aims to educate youth and job-seekers about the diversity of employment opportunities in Alberta's forest industry.
