= College of Registered Nurses of Alberta =

Canadian professional and regulatory body

- Type: Regulatory body
- Website: nurses.ab.ca

The College of Registered Nurses of Alberta (CRNA) is the professional and regulatory body for more than 36,000 registered nurses and nurse practitioners licensed to practice in the province of Alberta, Canada. The CRNA regulates registered nurses, nurse practitioners, certified graduate nurses, graduate nurses and graduate nurse practitioners.

The CRNA is mandated by the Health Professions Act. The CRNA is governed by its Council consists of 16 representatives, including eight elected registrants, and eight public representatives appointed by Alberta's Lieutenant Governor.
