= Battle of Alberta =

Rivalry between Edmonton and Calgary

The Battle of Alberta is a term applied to the intense rivalry between two Canadian cities in the province of Alberta; Calgary, the province's most populous city (since 1976), and Edmonton, the capital of the province (since 1905). Most often it is used to describe sporting events between the two cities, although this is not exclusive as the rivalry predates organized sports in Alberta.

== Origins ==
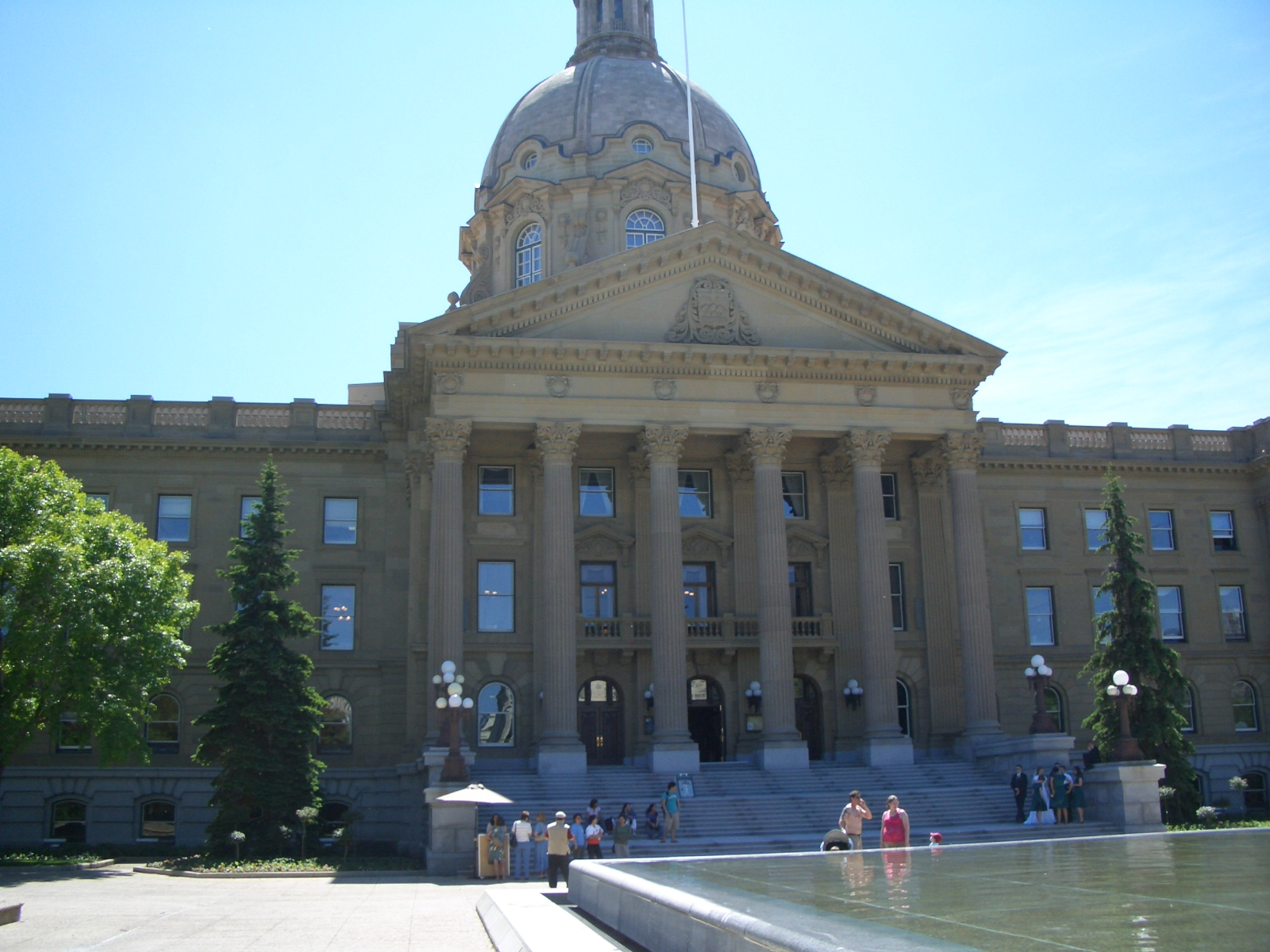
Edmonton was designated the provincial capital in 1905.

Harvey Locke identifies a longstanding cultural divide in Alberta between the centre and north on one hand and the south on the other as a recurring theme in the province's history going back to pre-contact Aboriginal cultures. The peoples of the boreal forest, and to a lesser extent, the aspen parkland, led a subarctic lifestyle which involved trapping fur-bearing animals and travelling by canoe, which made the region a natural fit for the fur trade. By contrast the plains cultures on the prairie to the south relied on the buffalo. The predominant political force on the prairie during the fur trade, the Blackfoot Confederacy, would not allow the Hudson's Bay Company to establish itself within Blackfoot territory, preferring to ride to Edmonton House (established 1795) to trade. Around this time some Cree and allied peoples (the Iron Confederacy) pushed south onto the plains, and became rivals of the Blackfoot. By the 1810s, explorer Peter Fidler identified the Battle River as a disputed frontier between the two groups. Locke asserts that the lack of an HBC presence in the south set the stage for very different patterns of settlement in the different regions. Calgary was founded as a North-West Mounted Police fort and was not much of a settlement at all until the mid-1880s when the Canadian Pacific Railway (CPR) suddenly shifted its planned route across Western Canada from a northern one (via Edmonton) to a more southerly path (via Calgary). Therefore, the economic and cultural origins of Calgary and its region, were created up by the NWMP and the CPR, not the HBC. Because of the CPR line, Calgary's agricultural hinterland was settled much sooner, mostly by people of British, and particularly Scottish, origins but it also has an American influence because of the ranching culture brought into the region by American cowboys. By contrast, Edmonton's hinterland is marked by a French Canadian and Métis presence, and was predominantly occupied by people of non-British European origins. In particular, the region just to the east of Edmonton, Kalyna Country, is Canada's oldest and largest area of Ukrainian settlement.

Following the debate over the CPR, the next important contest between the two cities was to determine which would become Alberta's capital city when the province was created in 1905. By this time, two new transcontinental railways had been built, both via Edmonton, under the guidance of a federal Liberal government that had replaced the Conservative government which had overseen construction of the CPR. Equally important, the Liberals overhauled Canada's immigration system. Whereas the Conservatives had endeavoured to restrict Western settlement to British immigrants, the Liberals had encouraged immigration from other parts of Europe, such as the Austro-Hungarian Empire. The result was that Edmonton and northern Alberta became much more ethnically diverse than Calgary and southern Alberta, occurring at a time when prejudice against non-British ethnic groups (in particular, Slavic peoples) was commonplace among those of British extraction, adding yet another layer of ill will between north and south.

Thus by the turn of the century, the differing political leanings of Calgary and Edmonton that persist to this day (that is, Calgary being quite conservative by Canadian standards and Edmonton tending to be more progressive) were already well established. Not surprisingly then, when the federal Liberal government admitted Alberta to Confederation in 1905, they named Edmonton the capital. However, the Calgary elite were even more infuriated when Edmonton's neighbour, the then-separate city of Strathcona, won the right to host the University of Alberta (see below).

The final important rivalry between the cities during Alberta's early years was over economic leadership, especially in the Oil patch. Calgary's nearby Turner Valley deposits were discovered in 1914, decades before Edmonton's Leduc #1 field in 1947. In part this accounts for the much larger concentration of head offices of large corporations in Calgary. Edmonton's business community contains more private corporations working in oil and gas, consulting and smaller operations. Edmonton is also the research and manufacturing centre of the Canadian petroleum industry, and roughly 80% of Canada's oil production is refined and sent to market through Refinery Row, located just east of the city in Strathcona County.

Today, although the rivalry is generally expressed only during sporting events, there remains an 'unspoken' friendly rivalry between residents that remains on a subtle level.

== Hosting of events ==
The rivalry also extends outside of team sports to international events. Both cities have hosted numerous national and international championships and other tournaments, often in a spirit of one-upmanship: there is constant need for local politicians to prove that their city is "world class" or at least better than the other.

The constant one-upmanship of the two cities in this field has receded in recent years, and they cooperated in a successful joint bid to host the 2012 World Junior Ice Hockey Championships (WJIHC).

=== Events hosted in Calgary ===
Calgary hosted the 1988 Winter Olympics, the 1996 International Rotarian Convention, and the 1997 World Police and Fire Games as well as the World Skills competition in 2009. Calgary is also an annual stop for many winter sport organizations, including International Skating Union (speed skating), International Bobsleigh and Skeleton Federation, International Luge Federation, and some International Ski Federation events. Calgary is also home to the world-famous Calgary Stampede.

Calgary was designated as "Canada's Cultural Capital" in 2012 for the inaugural year of the program. The federal government granted $1.6 million to develop and renovate the city's cultural institutions and promote the arts.

Social entrepreneurs and scholars convened in Calgary during October 2013 for the 6th Social Enterprise World Forum to discuss solutions for global problems.

In the summer of 2015, Calgary hosted the 2015 World Handball Championships. The ten-day tournament hosted athletes from 30 nations.

Calgary was named the host the 2024 Special Olympics Canada Winter Games.

=== Events hosted in Edmonton ===
Edmonton hosted the 1978 Commonwealth Games, the 1983 World University Games (Universiade), the 2001 World Championships in Athletics, and the 2005 World Masters Games. The city also had a circuit on the IndyCar Series, the Edmonton Indy, from 2005 to 2012. Edmonton was designated as one of the host cities of the 2015 FIFA Women's World Cup.

As of 2022, the Archdiocese of Edmonton hosted two papal visits: Peace tours of John Paul II in 1984, and the reconciliation visit of Pope Francis in 2022.

Edmonton annually hosts North America's largest fringe festival, the Edmonton International Fringe Festival, every August; the same month also sees the Edmonton Folk Music Festival. Edmonton also hosted the Canadian Finals Rodeo during the second week of November from 1974 to 2017. The Edmonton International Street Performers Festival takes place every June. The city also plays host to K-Days every July. Edmonton is widely known as Canada's Festival City due to the large number of festivals it hosts year-round.

=== Direct competition: Expo 2017 ===
In 2007, Edmonton started assessing the viability of hosting Expo 2017. The Edmonton City Council approved the building of a bid on April 15, 2009. Later in April, Calgary announced its coming bid to host Expo 2017, though it had not expressed any interest beforehand. In July of the same year, a disagreement occurred when Edmonton received provincial funding for its bid, while Calgary did not. Calgary withdrew its bid to host the event and Edmonton's bid also died when the federal government withdrew funding.

In the end, Expo 2017 was hosted in ⁣Astana, Kazakhstan.

== Sports ==
=== Baseball ===
==== Cannons vs. Trappers ====
Alberta's most prominent baseball rivalry existed between the Calgary Cannons and Edmonton Trappers of the Pacific Coast League. The Cannons existed from 1985 to 2002 while the Trappers existed from 1980 to 2004. The rivalry never reached the same level as it did in other sports, however, and ultimately both teams relocated to the United States (the Trappers to Round Rock, Texas, and the Cannons to Albuquerque, New Mexico). The Trappers captured four PCL championships during their existence, while the Cannons won none.

==== Vipers vs. Capitals ====
In 2011, the two cities competed in the North American League as the Calgary Vipers and Edmonton Capitals. The two teams met in the Northern Division playoffs in 2011; the Capitals won the series in six games. The Vipers folded after the season, and the Capitals suspended operations in February 2012, leaving the province with no professional baseball.

=== Football ===
The rivalry between the cities' professional Canadian football teams is equally intense, and even predates the hockey rivalries, as the first football games in Alberta history took place in the 1890s. A team from Edmonton made history as they played in the first football game in Alberta, playing to a scoreless tie against Clover Bar. The first game played between teams from Edmonton and Calgary took place in 1891 when Edmonton beat Calgary 6–5 in a total point challenge series.

The rivalry had been diminished for a number of years until the Calgary City Rugby Football Club and the Edmonton Rugby Football Club were formed in 1906 and 1907 respectively where the two teams competed in the Alberta Rugby Football Union. In 1908, the teams were re-organized as the Calgary Tigers and Edmonton Esquimaux where the Esquimaux won the ARFU title that year. From then on, the two cities had multiple teams represent them in the Alberta Union, but instability led to a lack of consistent rivalry battle between the two. Teams named the Calgary Canucks, Calgary 50th Battalion, Calgary-Altomah Tigers, Edmonton Elks, Edmonton Eskimos, and Edmonton Boosters all took turns playing in the ARFU. It was not until the creation of the Western Interprovincial Football Union that a truly sustained rivalry could take place between two teams representing the two cities.

Today, the primary football team rivalry consists of the Edmonton Elks and the Calgary Stampeders.

==== Elks vs. Stampeders ====
Elks–Stampeders rivalry
- Teams: Calgary Stampeders; Edmonton Elks
- First meeting: 1949
- Latest meeting: September 12, 2026
- Next meeting: TBA

Statistics
- Regular season series: 134–110–3 (EDM)
- Postseason results: 14–13 (EDM)
- Current win streak: Two (EDM)

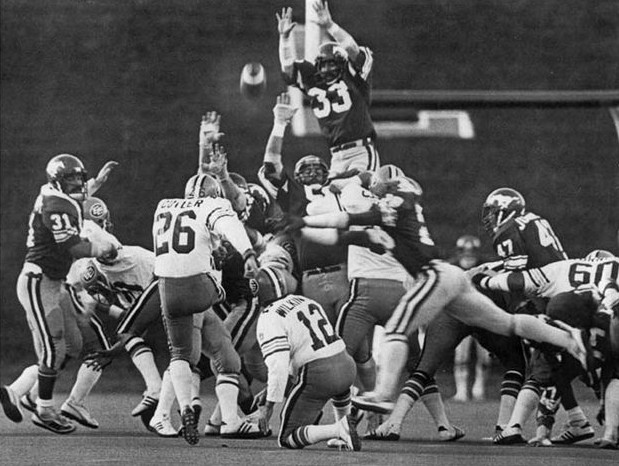
Doug Falconer (33) attempts to block a Dave Cutler FG kick during the 1978–79 season.

In 1921, a team from Edmonton called the Edmonton Eskimos won the Alberta Rugby Football Union (ARFU) league title. They made it past the winners of the Manitoba Rugby Football Union (MRFU) and Saskatchewan Rugby Football Union (SRFU), becoming the first Alberta team (and the first Western Canadian team) to ever compete for the Grey Cup, losing in the 9th Grey Cup game, then advancing again the next year (as the Edmonton Elks) to a loss in the 10th Grey Cup. The team's name goes back to the dawn of the Battle of Alberta when, at the end of the 19th century, a "rugby football" game between Edmonton and Calgary saw the Calgary media make reference to Edmonton's more northern latitude by calling the city's residents "Esquimeaux" (an archaic spelling of "Eskimos"). This Eskimos team folded in 1924, but the Edmonton Eskimos football name reappeared in the ARFU with a different team in 1929, moving to the Western Interprovincial Football Union (WIFU) in 1938 before folding again in 1940.

A similar Calgary Rugby Football Club formed in 1907, competing in the AFRU under various names until – while operating as the Calgary Bronks – joining the Regina Roughriders (from the SRFU) and Winnipeg Blue Bombers (from the MRFU) to form the higher-level WIFU in 1936. The Bronks folded after the 1941 season, the year after the Eskimos had folded. A subsequent Calgary team, the Calgary Stampeders, was formed and joined the WIFU in 1948. This Stampeders team advanced to that year's 36th Grey Cup, becoming the first Calgary team to compete for the Grey Cup and the first Alberta team to win that championship.

The next season, in 1949, the current incarnation of the Edmonton Eskimos – now known as Edmonton Elks, was founded and immediately joined the WIFU – this time, for good. This Eskimos team's first ever game was on Labour Day against the defending Grey Cup Stampeders, who defeated the Eskimos 20–6 in the restart of the currently ongoing version of the football Battle of Alberta. Since 1949, the Elks and Stampeders have played on Labour Day every year with the exception of eleven seasons, having an unbroken run since the 1982 season. This has been one of the Canadian Football League's marquee match-ups, with the Monday Labour Day Classic in Calgary followed by the Friday night (Saturday, since 2014) rematch in Edmonton, resulting in a very short turnaround for both teams. As of the 2026 CFL season, the all-time record favours Edmonton, as the Elks have a record of 134–109–3 against their provincial rivals.

In terms of the post-season, the two teams have played each other 27 times, with Edmonton holding a slight edge with 14 victories. The two teams also frequently met in the West Final. Between 1990 and 2003, the two teams clashed nine times to decide who would represent the West in the Grey Cup, and at least one Alberta team was in the game each year. Calgary has won six out of the last nine playoff match-ups, the most recent one in the 2017 West Final. Meanwhile, Edmonton has won the most recent championship by an Albertan team, in 2026 with the 113th Grey Cup game. While the Stampeders may have won the Grey Cup first, the Elks have won the most recently and the most in total, with 15 titles compared to the Stampeders' eight as of 2021.

Currently, the Calgary and Edmonton franchises play each other two to three times during the regular season and have played each other at least three times in every regular season but 2004 between 1996 and 2017. The Stampeders qualified for the playoffs in every season from 2005 to 2023, while the Elks have missed the playoffs eight times in that same time frame. Both teams have enjoyed much success in their histories as both franchises had never missed the playoffs at the same time until the 2024 season. The Elks have made the playoffs in all but seven years since 1966, including 34 years in a row from 1972 to 2005 – a streak unmatched in North American major league sports. The Stampeders have only missed the playoffs seven times since 1978.

=== Hockey ===
During the first week of March, 1895 a team of Calgarians mostly from the Calgary Fire Brigade's hockey club, travelled to Edmonton to play against a Mounted Police team from Fort Saskatchewan and the Edmonton Thistles shutting out both. It was the first recorded game between any Calgary and Edmonton teams.

The first professional hockey rivalry between the two cities dates to the founding of the Western Canada Hockey League in 1921. Both cities received teams, Calgary the Tigers, and Edmonton the Eskimos. The Eskimos won the WCHL title in 1923, but lost the Stanley Cup to the rival National Hockey League's Ottawa Senators. Calgary also appeared in a Stanley Cup championship series in 1924, but lost to the Montreal Canadiens of the NHL. After the demise of the WCHL in 1926, Alberta hockey fans turned to junior hockey. Both cities had teams in the Western Hockey League and Alberta Junior Hockey League.

Pro hockey did not return until the World Hockey Association arrived in 1972. Both cities received teams, but Calgary's Broncos folded without playing a game. The new Edmonton Oilers, then were left without an intra-provincial rival until a new WHA team, the Calgary Cowboys arrived in 1975, but they folded in 1977. The short and sporadic nature of the Calgary WHA franchises made building meaningful rivalries more difficult. The WHA itself was unstable and merged with the NHL in 1979.

==== Flames vs. Oilers ====
The Battle of Alberta is one of the fiercest and most famous rivalries in Alberta, between the Calgary Flames and Edmonton Oilers. The rivalry peaked during the mid-late 1980s, as from 1983 to 1990 the Western (then Campbell) Conference only had two different champions, both being Calgary and Edmonton. They frequently played each other in the playoffs, with three series going seven games. Edmonton won the Stanley Cup in 1984, 1985, 1987, 1988, and 1990. Calgary won the Stanley Cup in 1989. Calgary leads the all-time series with a 141–129–18–6 record, however, Edmonton leads in postseason victories with a 23–12 record.

==== Hitmen vs. Oil Kings ====
Hitmen–Oil Kings rivalry
- Teams: Calgary Hitmen; Edmonton Oil Kings
- First meeting: 2007

Statistics
- Postseason results: 5–5

Postseason history
- 2009 WHL playoffs: Calgary won, 4–0; 2019 WHL playoffs: Edmonton won, 4–0

Although not nearly as intense, the Western Hockey League intends to develop one for the Calgary Hitmen and Edmonton Oil Kings. The junior clubs are owned by the Flames and Oilers respectively. Both cities have had several franchises throughout the WHL's history. The original Oil Kings franchise faced the Calgary Centennials from the league's founding in 1966 until the Oil Kings relocation to Portland in 1976. The Calgary Hitmen were formed in 1995, followed a year later by the Edmonton Ice. The Ice never gained a foothold in Edmonton, and left for the Kootenays after two years. The Hitmen survived their initial struggles to grow into one of junior hockey's biggest drawing teams. The modern Oil Kings joined the WHL as an expansion franchise in 2007.

There are currently five Alberta-based WHL teams. In addition to Calgary and Edmonton, there are also the Medicine Hat Tigers, Lethbridge Hurricanes, and Red Deer Rebels and they all play together in one division, making for many intense intra-provincial battles.

=== Lacrosse ===
==== Roughnecks–Rush rivalry ====
Roughnecks–Rush rivalry
- Teams: Calgary Roughnecks; Edmonton Rush
- First meeting: 2006
- Latest meeting: 2015

Statistics
- Regular season series: 26–10
- Postseason results: 3–1 (total games)

Postseason history
- 2010 NLL playoffs: Edmonton won, 11–7; 2012 NLL playoffs: Edmonton won, 19–11; 2014 NLL playoffs: Calgary won, 2–1

Box Lacrosse has seen significant growth in Alberta in recent years, with the Calgary Roughnecks joining the National Lacrosse League in 2001, followed by the Edmonton Rush in 2005. The two teams were poised to form another Alberta rivalry as the two cities have in many other sports. The Rush took out ads in Calgary newspapers before their first ever meeting saying the Rush would "open a can" on the Roughnecks. This backfired as the Roughnecks defeated the Rush. The Roughnecks tried this tactic against Edmonton before the April 5, 2008 game by placing an ad in the Edmonton Sun saying that Edmonton was a "City of Losers" instead of a "City of Champions". Just as it had for the Rush, the plan backfired as the Rush won 11–9. Calgary won the Champion's Cup in 2004 and 2009. Edmonton won the Champion's Cup in May 2015, before moving to Saskatoon that July.

=== Soccer ===
A rivalry existed between Cavalry FC and FC Edmonton of the Canadian Premier League. It had been nicknamed the Al Classico. As per the fashion in rivalries in Association football around the world, the Wildrose Cup was created and was awarded annually to the team that wins the most points from the Al Classico in league play.

=== University sports ===
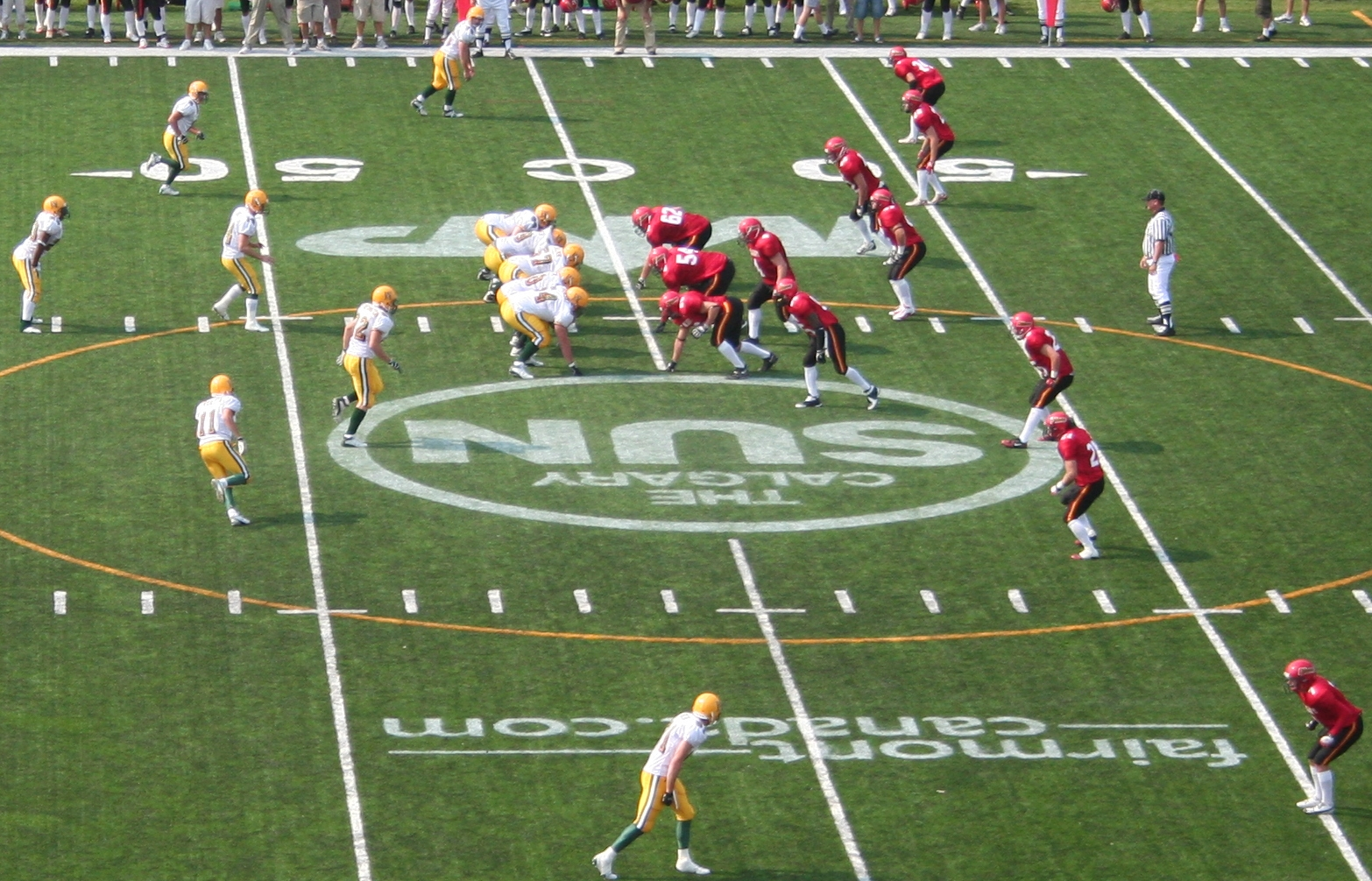
An Alberta Golden Bears–Calgary Dinos football game at McMahon Stadium in 2006

Another prominent rivalry exists between the major universities in each city, notably the University of Alberta, in Edmonton, and the University of Calgary, dating back to the creation of the province of Alberta in 1905.

Heated wrangling took place between the cities of Calgary and Edmonton over the location of the new provincial capital and of the new provincial university. The neighbouring province of Saskatchewan had been formed on the same day as Alberta, settling a similar dispute between its own two major cities by making Regina the provincial capital and Saskatoon the site of the University of Saskatchewan. Alberta's first Premier, Alexander Rutherford, offered a similar solution by stating that the Alberta capital would be north of the North Saskatchewan River and that the provincial university would be in a city south of the river. The city of Edmonton, on the north bank of the river, became the capital while the city of Strathcona, on the south bank of the river (and the location of Rutherford's home), was granted the university. When the two cities were amalgamated in 1912, Edmonton became both the political and academic capital.

Calgary was not granted a university until 1966.

Sports competitions between the two universities have taken place over who has possession of a painted rock. Meanwhile, the University of Alberta has consistently ranked much higher than the University of Calgary in major national and international rankings of universities.

== See also ==
- Battle of Ontario
