= Calgary True Buddha Pai Yuin Temple =

Buddhist centre in Canada

Coordinates: 51.0683°N 114.0629°W

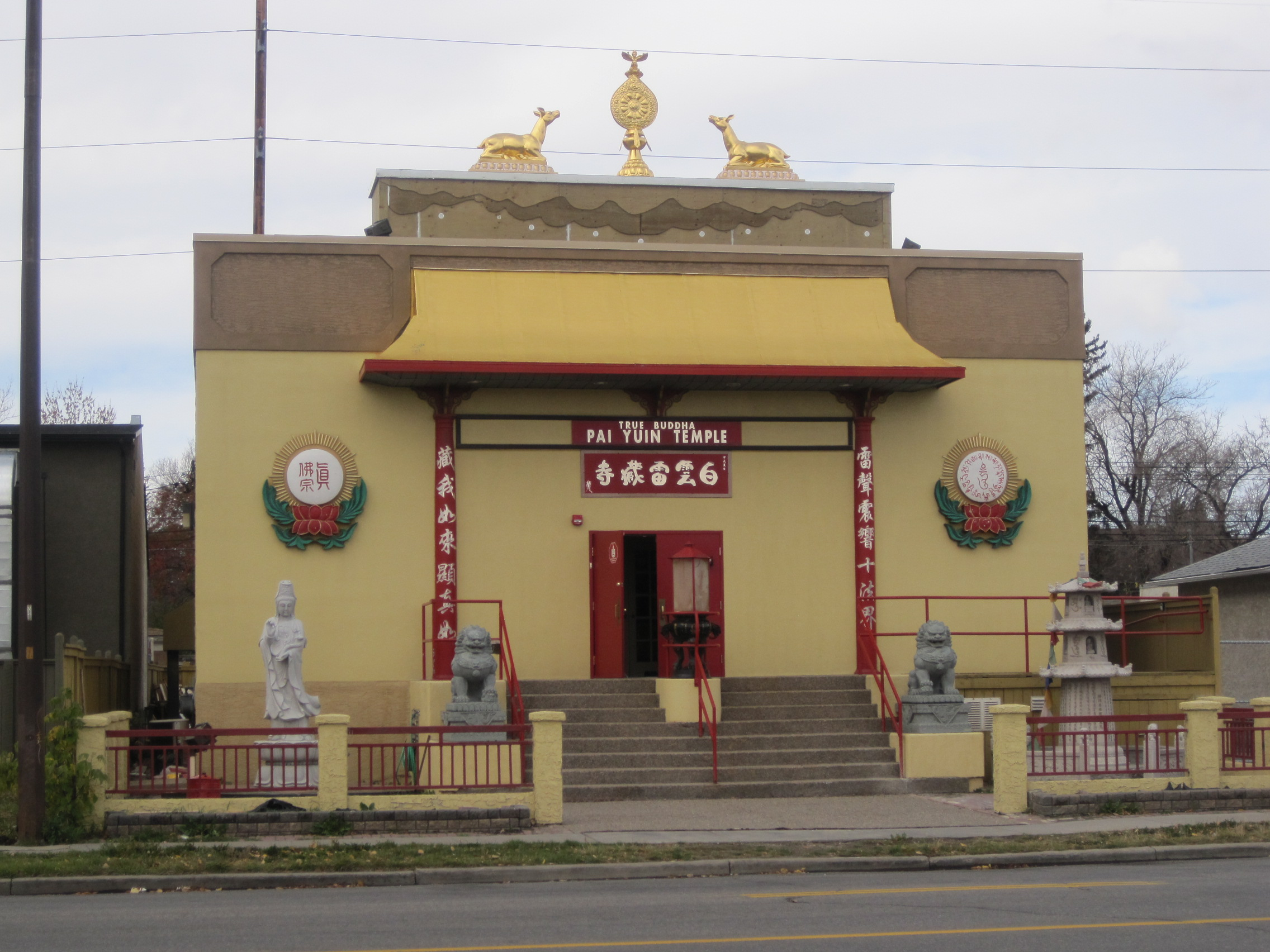
Front Exterior of the Temple

The Calgary True Buddha Pai Yuin Temple is a Chinese Vajrayana Buddhist temple in Calgary, Alberta, Canada. It was built in 1984 through the concerted efforts of a small group who wanted a place to practice and spread Buddhism as taught by their founding guru, Grandmaster Sheng-yen Lu. It was built entirely through private donations. The name "Pai Yuin" was designated by Sheng-yen Lu, which literally means "White Cloud." The temple is open 7 days a week to the public from 11:00am to 5:00pm.

This temple is part of a larger global organization known as the True Buddha School, with over 400 chapters and branches worldwide. The majority of the True Buddha School's members reside in Asia, especially in Taiwan, Hong Kong, Malaysia, Singapore and Indonesia. The main languages spoken at the Pai Yuin Temple include Cantonese, Mandarin, and English.

In 2010, the Pai Yuin Temple renovated and expanded their premises, which increased the size of the main hall and shrine. In August 2012, Grandmaster Sheng-yen Lu visited the temple to perform the consecration ceremony. The Pai Yuin Temple's shrine include an eclectic mix of Buddhist statuettes with varying Chinese, Tibetan, and Japanese (Shingon) styles. Notable statues include a lifelike statue of Sheng-yen Lu (used to enhance visualization for the practice of Guru Yoga), Bodhidharma (the founder of Zen Buddhism), Yamantaka, Acala, Guanyin (Sanskrit: Avalokitesvara), Amitabha Buddha, Maha Mayuri (Peacock King), and Ragaraja. The main shrine is flanked by subsidiary shrines that include the protectors of the Chinese animal horoscopes, the local earth god (Tudigong), as well as popular Hindu deities, including Ganesh, Prithvi, and Brahma. The Hindu deities are a popular focal point for enrichment or worldly practices. On the lower floor of the temple, there is a traditional Chinese Ancestral shrine (known as the Ksitigarbha Bodhisattva Hall). In the ancestral shrine, family members or friends may sponsor the names of their deceased loved ones, which are inscribed on plaques as a memorial.

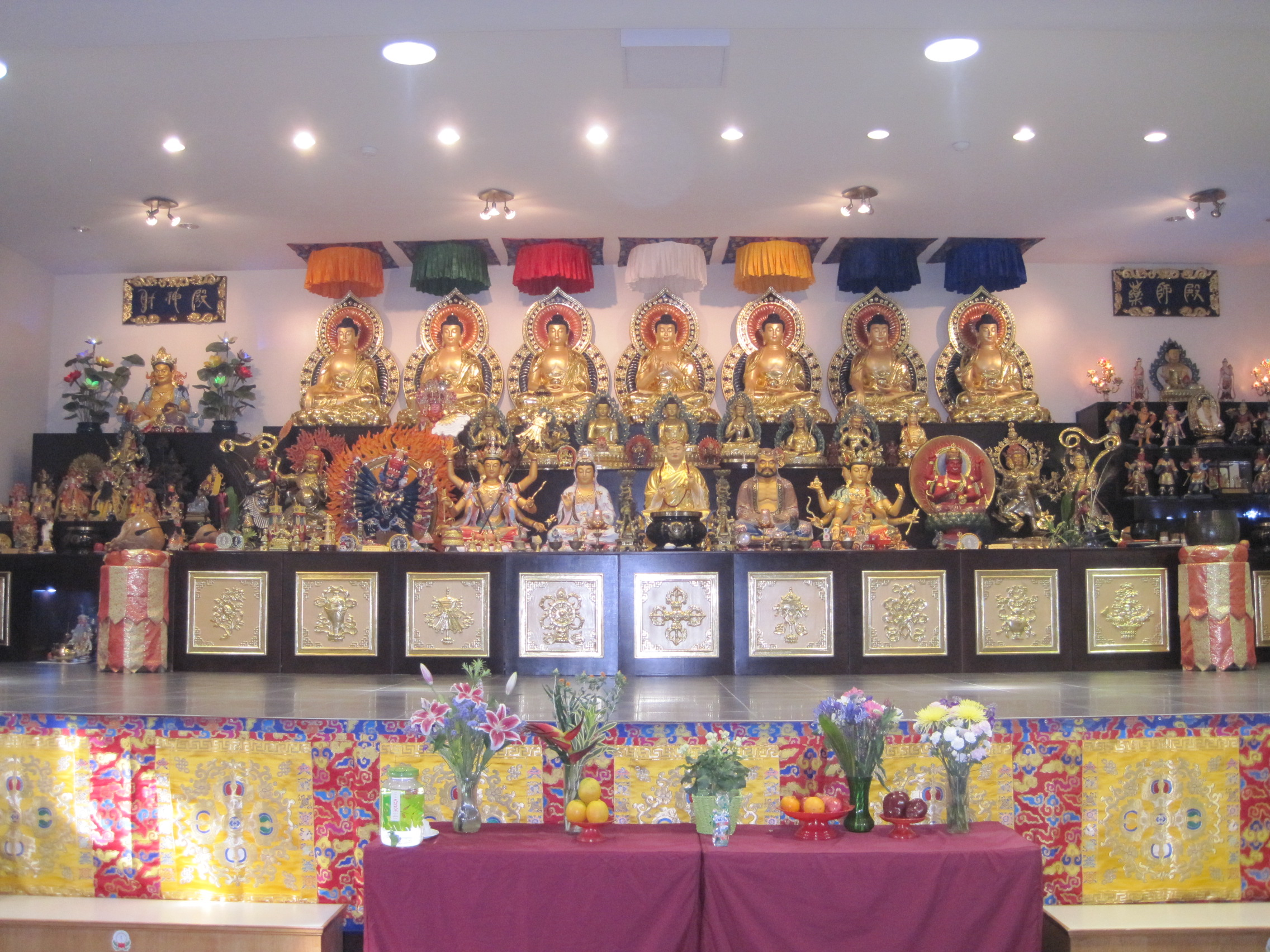
Main shrine inside the Pai Yuin Temple

The temple has an estimate of 1000 members, though actual attendance numbers vary depending on the type of ceremony conducted at the temple. Ceremonies include the performance of homas (fire offerings), sadhana meditations, mantra chanting, bardo deliverance for deceased loved ones, and blessing ceremonies for the purpose of purification, harmony, enrichment, and protection. On days when ceremonies take place, the temple offers a complimentary vegetarian (vegan) lunch for all attendants. The busiest day of the year occurs during Chinese New Year, where visitors number in the hundreds. The types of sadhana meditations include the practice of the Four Preliminaries, Guru Yoga, Personal Deity Yoga (Yidam Yoga), and Vase Breathing techniques.

There are a total of 10 ordained members at the temple, which include 3 monks and 7 nuns. Of the ordained members, 2 of them have the Acharya status. In addition to public ceremonies, the ordained perform funeral services for the deceased and such traditional Chinese practices as the use of Joss Stick divination and consultation for auspicious days.

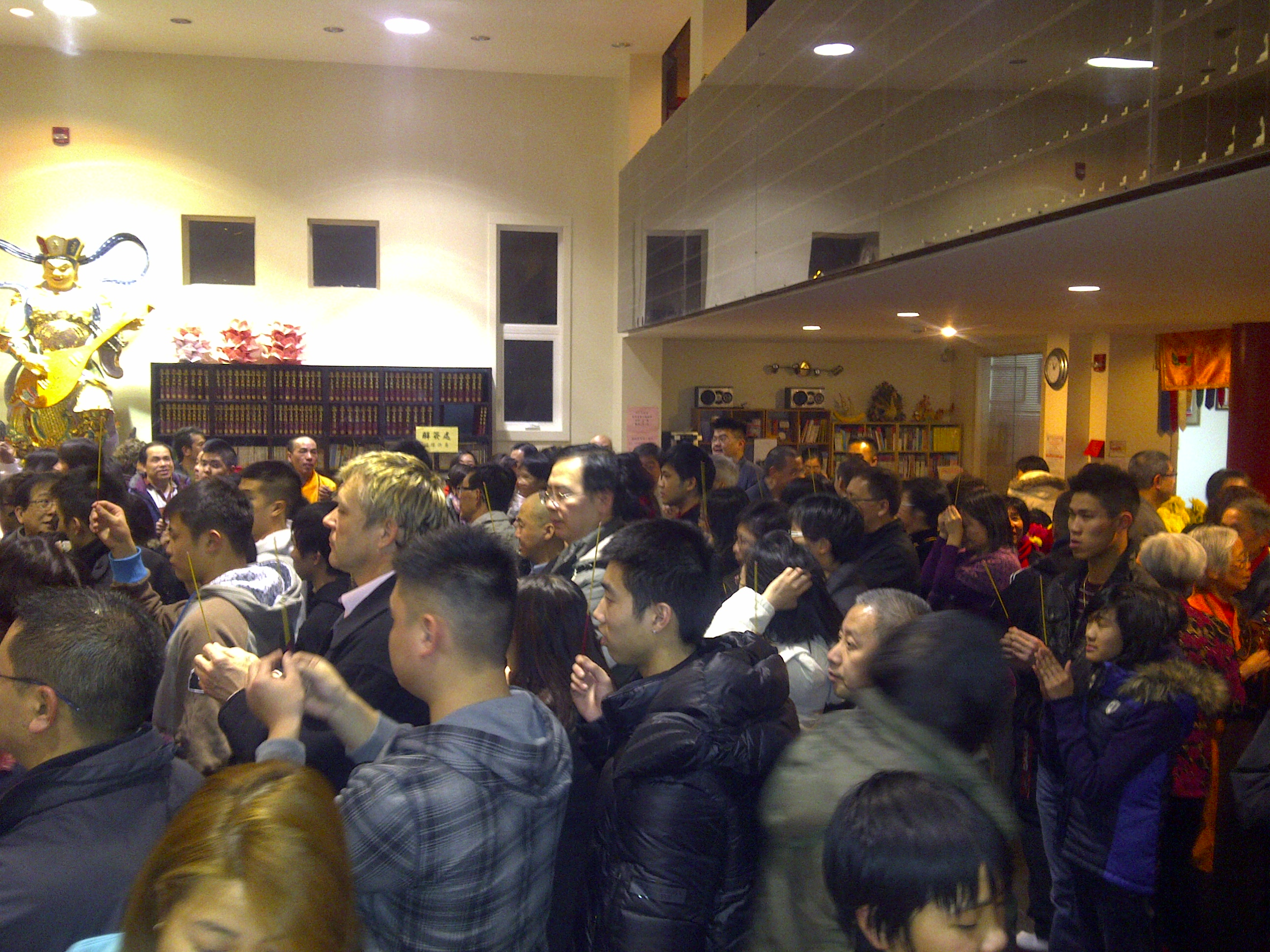
Crowds of people visit the Pai Yuin Temple during Chinese New Years
