= List of population centres in Alberta =

A population centre, in Canadian census data, is a populated place, or a cluster of interrelated populated places, which meet the demographic characteristics of an urban area. A population centre has a population of at least 1,000 and a population density of no fewer than 400 people per square kilometre.

Population centres are not the same thing as urban municipalities. For example, the city of St. Albert is legally separate from Edmonton, but they are part of the same population centre.

The term was introduced in the Canada 2011 Census; prior to that, Statistics Canada used the term urban area.

As of the 2006 Census of Canada, the Province of Alberta had 107 urban areas with a cumulative population of 2,699,851 and an average population of 25,232. In the 2011 census, Statistics Canada listed 109 population centres in the province. This number increased to 122 in the Canada 2016 Census.

== List ==
The below table is a list of those population centres in Alberta from the 2021 Census of Population as designated, named, and delineated by Statistics Canada.

List of population centres in Alberta
Rank	Population centre	Size group	Population (2021)	Population (2016)	Change	Land area (km^{2})	Population density
1	Calgary	Large urban	1,305,550	1,240,413	+5.3%	621.72	2,099.9/km^{2}
2	Edmonton	Large urban	1,151,635	1,070,998	+7.5%	627.2	1,836.2/km^{2}
3	Red Deer	Medium	99,846	99,773	+0.1%	65.93	1,514.4/km^{2}
4	Lethbridge	Medium	92,563	89,309	+3.6%	64	1,446.3/km^{2}
5	Airdrie	Medium	73,578	61,082	+20.5%	33.03	2,227.6/km^{2}
6	Fort McMurray	Medium	68,002	67,123	+1.3%	52.17	1,303.5/km^{2}
7	Medicine Hat	Medium	63,382	63,111	+0.4%	53.2	1,191.4/km^{2}
8	Grande Prairie	Medium	63,172	62,382	+1.3%	49.74	1,270.0/km^{2}
9	Spruce Grove	Medium	39,348	36,279	+8.5%	29.76	1,322.2/km^{2}
10	Leduc	Medium	33,505	29,561	+13.3%	67.43	496.9/km^{2}
11	Cochrane	Medium	31,638	25,501	+24.1%	23.71	1,334.4/km^{2}
12	Lloydminster	Medium	31,582	31,400	+0.6%	24.43	1,292.8/km^{2}
13	Okotoks	Medium	30,214	28,833	+4.8%	17.23	1,753.6/km^{2}
14	Fort Saskatchewan	Small	26,831	23,944	+12.1%	21.85	1,228.0/km^{2}
15	Chestermere	Small	21,425	19,477	+10.0%	8.99	2,383.2/km^{2}
16	Beaumont	Small	20,779	17,396	+19.4%	10.4	1,998.0/km^{2}
17	Camrose	Small	18,454	18,520	−0.4%	17.1	1,079.2/km^{2}
18	Stony Plain	Small	17,253	16,416	+5.1%	17.73	973.1/km^{2}
19	Sylvan Lake	Small	16,142	14,977	+7.8%	10.49	1,538.8/km^{2}
20	Brooks	Small	14,904	14,436	+3.2%	12.78	1,166.2/km^{2}
21	High River	Small	14,119	13,420	+5.2%	10.13	1,393.8/km^{2}
22	Strathmore	Small	13,851	13,592	+1.9%	9.46	1,464.2/km^{2}
23	Canmore	Small	13,268	12,021	+10.4%	12.96	1,023.8/km^{2}
24	Lacombe	Small	12,835	12,740	+0.7%	11.87	1,081.3/km^{2}
25	Wetaskiwin	Small	12,438	12,491	−0.4%	12.11	1,027.1/km^{2}
26	Morinville	Small	10,385	9,848	+5.5%	11.15	931.4/km^{2}
27	Blackfalds	Small	10,315	9,161	+12.6%	8.93	1,155.1/km^{2}
28	Whitecourt	Small	9,195	9,515	−3.4%	10.22	899.7/km^{2}
29	Hinton	Small	9,191	9,205	−0.2%	12.97	708.6/km^{2}
30	Olds	Small	8,983	8,944	+0.4%	9.51	944.6/km^{2}
31	Taber	Small	8,978	8,558	+4.9%	15.69	572.2/km^{2}
32	Coaldale	Small	8,592	8,153	+5.4%	5.84	1,471.2/km^{2}
33	Banff	Small	8,305	7,851	+5.8%	4.08	2,035.5/km^{2}
34	Edson	Small	8,166	8,148	+0.2%	10.7	763.2/km^{2}
35	Grand Centre	Small	7,514	7,256	+3.6%	18.07	415.8/km^{2}
36	Cold Lake	Small	7,201	6,795	+6.0%	5.71	1,261.1/km^{2}
37	Ponoka	Small	7,032	6,899	+1.9%	5.61	1,253.5/km^{2}
38	Innisfail	Small	7,016	6,937	+1.1%	5.23	1,341.5/km^{2}
39	Drayton Valley	Small	6,970	6,867	+1.5%	7.22	965.4/km^{2}
40	Devon	Small	6,545	6,578	−0.5%	14.26	459.0/km^{2}
41	Slave Lake	Small	6,542	6,155	+6.3%	6.63	986.7/km^{2}
42	Rocky Mountain House	Small	6,518	6,429	+1.4%	7.47	872.6/km^{2}
43	Drumheller	Small	6,497	6,439	+0.9%	9.48	685.3/km^{2}
44	Wainwright	Small	6,461	6,153	+5.0%	5.08	1,271.9/km^{2}
45	Bonnyville	Small	6,359	5,858	+8.6%	6.4	993.6/km^{2}
46	St. Paul	Small	5,685	5,728	−0.8%	5.03	1,130.2/km^{2}
47	Stettler	Small	5,595	5,872	−4.7%	7.46	750.0/km^{2}
48	Redcliff	Small	5,385	5,474	−1.6%	7.39	728.7/km^{2}
49	Vegreville	Small	5,383	5,436	−1.0%	5.05	1,065.9/km^{2}
50	Langdon	Small	5,193	5,060	+2.6%	4.32	1,202.1/km^{2}
51	Didsbury	Small	5,024	5,206	−3.5%	5.43	925.2/km^{2}
52	Westlock	Small	4,820	4,957	−2.8%	5.26	916.3/km^{2}
53	Peace River	Small	4,264	4,348	−1.9%	5.06	842.7/km^{2}
54	Barrhead	Small	4,055	4,387	−7.6%	4.73	857.3/km^{2}
55	Jasper	Small	4,029	3,948	+2.1%	1.84	2,189.7/km^{2}
56	Raymond	Small	3,942	3,553	+10.9%	3.92	1,005.6/km^{2}
57	Carstairs	Small	3,660	3,080	+18.8%	4.76	768.9/km^{2}
58	Crossfield	Small	3,579	2,973	+20.4%	3.99	897.0/km^{2}
59	Vermilion	Small	3,552	3,697	−3.9%	3.66	970.5/km^{2}
60	Cardston	Small	3,519	3,389	+3.8%	3.88	907.0/km^{2}
61	Pincher Creek	Small	3,463	3,523	−1.7%	4.06	853.0/km^{2}
62	High Level	Small	3,461	2,746	+26.0%	2.68	1,291.4/km^{2}
63	Claresholm	Small	3,434	3,424	+0.3%	2.68	1,281.3/km^{2}
64	Penhold	Small	3,359	3,210	+4.6%	1.65	2,035.8/km^{2}
65	Fort Macleod	Small	3,038	2,718	+11.8%	2.28	1,332.5/km^{2}
66	Grande Cache	Small	3,037	3,286	−7.6%	3.72	816.4/km^{2}
67	Gibbons	Small	2,989	2,973	+0.5%	4.78	625.3/km^{2}
68	La Crète	Small	2,911	2,739	+6.3%	3.02	963.9/km^{2}
69	Three Hills	Small	2,902	3,078	−5.7%	3.14	924.2/km^{2}
70	Coalhurst	Small	2,818	2,623	+7.4%	1.76	1,601.1/km^{2}
71	Clairmont	Small	2,808	2,411	+16.5%	4.16	675.0/km^{2}
72	Black Diamond	Small	2,574	2,552	+0.9%	2.15	1,197.2/km^{2}
73	Grimshaw	Small	2,519	2,599	−3.1%	4.13	609.9/km^{2}
74	Fairview	Small	2,427	2,598	−6.6%	2.26	1,073.9/km^{2}
75	Turner Valley	Small	2,409	2,373	+1.5%	3.3	730.0/km^{2}
76	Magrath	Small	2,308	2,235	+3.3%	2.7	854.8/km^{2}
77	Sexsmith	Small	2,275	2,461	−7.6%	1.83	1,243.2/km^{2}
78	Rimbey	Small	2,258	2,349	−3.9%	3.63	622.0/km^{2}
79	Beaverlodge	Small	2,251	2,440	−7.7%	3.33	676.0/km^{2}
80	Hanna	Small	2,234	2,332	−4.2%	2.29	975.5/km^{2}
81	Lac la Biche	Small	2,138	2,294	−6.8%	2.94	727.2/km^{2}
82	High Prairie	Small	2,065	2,264	−8.8%	2.37	871.3/km^{2}
83	Westlake	Small	2,040	1,363	+49.7%	3.27	623.9/km^{2}
84	Nanton	Small	1,984	1,970	+0.7%	1.56	1,271.8/km^{2}
85	Heritage Pointe	Small	1,974	2,075	−4.9%	4.78	413.0/km^{2}
86	Calmar	Small	1,883	1,986	−5.2%	1.33	1,415.8/km^{2}
87	Millet	Small	1,847	1,905	−3.0%	2.18	847.2/km^{2}
88	Provost	Small	1,834	1,945	−5.7%	2.09	877.5/km^{2}
89	Bow Island	Small	1,829	1,773	+3.2%	1.3	1,406.9/km^{2}
90	Tofield	Small	1,811	1,854	−2.3%	1.22	1,484.4/km^{2}
91	Picture Butte	Small	1,808	1,700	+6.4%	1.95	927.2/km^{2}
92	Redwater	Small	1,802	1,591	+13.3%	2.01	896.5/km^{2}
93	Sundre	Small	1,781	1,866	−4.6%	2.37	751.5/km^{2}
94	Vulcan	Small	1,558	1,680	−7.3%	1.7	916.5/km^{2}
95	Springbrook	Small	1,534	1,502	+2.1%	2.19	700.5/km^{2}
96	Blairmore	Small	1,522	1,545	−1.5%	2.04	746.1/km^{2}
97	Bon Accord	Small	1,451	1,529	−5.1%	2.13	681.2/km^{2}
98	Coleman	Small	1,441	1,475	−2.3%	1.99	724.1/km^{2}
99	Nobleford	Small	1,438	1,278	+12.5%	0.98	1,467.3/km^{2}
100	Wembley	Small	1,432	1,516	−5.5%	2.2	650.9/km^{2}
101	Fox Creek	Small	1,426	1,730	−17.6%	1.36	1,048.5/km^{2}
102	Elk Point	Small	1,394	1,437	−3.0%	2.26	616.8/km^{2}
103	Two Hills	Small	1,379	1,291	+6.8%	1.25	1,103.2/km^{2}
104	Lamont	Small	1,328	1,347	−1.4%	1.93	688.1/km^{2}
105	Vauxhall	Small	1,286	1,222	+5.2%	2.71	474.5/km^{2}
106	Valleyview	Small	1,280	1,421	−9.9%	1.55	825.8/km^{2}
107	Bowden	Small	1,275	1,240	+2.8%	2.82	452.1/km^{2}
108	Lancaster Park	Small	1,253	1,501	−16.5%	0.92	1,362.0/km^{2}
109	Swan Hills	Small	1,191	1,275	−6.6%	2.39	498.3/km^{2}
110	Bassano	Small	1,186	1,201	−1.2%	1.33	891.7/km^{2}
111	Athabasca	Small	1,181	1,250	−5.5%	2.03	581.8/km^{2}
112	Mayerthorpe	Small	1,171	1,205	−2.8%	1.29	907.8/km^{2}
113	Legal	Small	1,164	1,251	−7.0%	1.79	650.3/km^{2}
114	Irricana	Small	1,135	1,160	−2.2%	1.14	995.6/km^{2}
115	Stirling	Small	1,134	938	+20.9%	2.03	558.6/km^{2}
116	Alberta Beach - Val Quentin	Small	1,103	1,327	−16.9%	1.69	652.7/km^{2}
117	Carriage Lane Estates	Small	1,094	1,008	+8.5%	1.34	816.4/km^{2}
118	Cardiff	Small	1,033	1,167	−11.5%	0.98	1,054.1/km^{2}
119	Manning	Small	1,027	1,072	−4.2%	1.37	749.6/km^{2}

== Retired population centres ==
The following is a list of communities were once designated as population centres by Statistics Canada, but were retired after their populations dropped below 1,000 people. Some of them have since surpassed the minimum population threshold of 1,000 yet have not been reintroduced as population centres.

- Smoky Lake (retired after 2016)
- Spirit River (retired after 2016)

== Retired urban areas ==
The following is a list of communities were once designated as urban areas by Statistics Canada, but were retired after their populations dropped below 1,000 people. Some of them have since surpassed the minimum population threshold of 1,000 yet have not been reintroduced as population centres.

- Bellevue (retired after 1991 census)
- Castor (retired after 1991)
- Coronation (retired after 1991)
- Lake Louise (retired after 2001 census)
- McLennan (retired after 1986)

== See also ==
- List of the largest population centres in Canada
- List of census agglomerations in Alberta
- List of census divisions of Alberta
- List of cities in Alberta
- List of communities in Alberta
- List of designated places in Alberta
- List of hamlets in Alberta
- List of municipalities in Alberta
- List of towns in Alberta
- List of villages in Alberta
