= Constitution of Alberta =

Constitution of Canadian province

The Constitution of Alberta describes the fundamental rules under which the Canadian province of Alberta is governed. As is typical of all Canadian provinces, and Westminster systems more generally, Alberta's is an unwritten constitution. Alberta's constitution, like the United Kingdom's (on which it is modelled), includes any and all pieces of legislation, court decisions, proclamations, and conventions which together inform how the province operates. Many statutes are important to understanding the governance of the province, but nowhere are they consolidated into a single document or even a list. The office of Attorney-General at one time suggested 23 acts which might be included, but cautioned that this was not a "definitive list". However, since Alberta is a part of federation, its powers are clearly delineated in law, via the Constitution of Canada.

As part of the Canadian federation, Alberta, like all of the provinces, is bound by the terms of the Constitution of Canada; this includes rules concerning the division of powers between the federal order of government and the provinces, as well as the rights of individuals vis-à-vis the state. The legislature of the province can only legislate on topics delegated to the provinces under Section 92 of the Constitution Act, 1867, and since 1982 it is further bound by the Canadian Charter of Rights and Freedoms, in both instances being subject to judicial review.

At the time that Alberta was created, the basics of its structure were set out in a statute passed by the federal parliament, the Alberta Act (1905). This is considered a constitutional document and is listed as such in the appendix to the Constitution Act, 1982. Nevertheless, Alberta has always had the power to change its own internal composition without the approval of the federal parliament (within limits), and has done so on many occasions. For example Alberta has at various times had both a first-past-the-post and a hybrid single transferable vote / instant-runoff voting electoral system.

Since 1982, provinces have had the option of making some laws explicitly part of their constitution under a formula contained within the Constitution of Canada. Alberta has done this only once as of 2021. The Constitution of Alberta Amendment Act, 1990 enshrines the existence of Métis settlements in Alberta and provides a guarantee that they will not be abolished without the consent of the Métis people in Alberta.
