= List of census agglomerations in Alberta =

A census agglomeration is a census geographic unit in Canada determined by Statistics Canada. A census agglomeration comprises one or more adjacent census subdivisions that has a core population of 10,000 or greater. It is eligible for classification as a census metropolitan area once it reaches a population of 100,000.

At the 2016 Census, the Province of Alberta had 15 census agglomerations, down from 16 in the 2011 Census. At the 2011 Census, the Province of Alberta had 16 census agglomerations, up from 14 in the 2006 Census.

The former CA of Lethbridge was promoted to a census metropolitan area in 2016.

== List ==
The following is a list of the census agglomerations within Alberta.

Census agglomeration	Area in 2016 (km²)	Population in 2016	Population in 2011	Population in 2006	Population in 2001	Population in 1996	Census division
Red Deer	104.73	100,418	90,564	82,772 (Note: In the 2011 census, the 2006 populations of numerous CAs were adjusted for comparison purposes with the 2011 populations. The 2006 adjusted populations included: 83,154 for Red Deer (boundary expanded); 47,107 for Grande Prairie (boundary collapsed by removing the County of Grande Prairie No. 1 census consolidated subdivision); 17,150 for Okotoks (boundary expanded); 15,630 for Camrose (boundary expanded); 10,716 for High River (newly created CA); 10,703 for Sylvan Lake (newly created CA); 11,689 for Wetaskiwin (boundary expanded); 10,280 for Strathmore (newly created CA); and 10,752 for Lacombe (newly created CA).)	67,707 (Note: In the 2006 census, the 2001 populations of numerous CAs were adjusted for comparison purposes with the 2006 populations. The 2001 adjusted populations included: 87,388 for Lethbridge (boundary expanded); 67,829 for Red Deer (boundary expanded); 58,787 for Grande Prairie (boundary expanded); 42,581 for Wood Buffalo (boundary expanded); 23,964 for Lloydminster (boundary expanded); 21,685 for Brooks (boundary expanded); 11,689 for Okotoks (newly created CA); 14,870 for Camrose (boundary expanded); 10,792 for Canmore (newly created CA); and 11,520 for Cold Lake (boundary reduced).)	60,075 (Note: In the 2001 census, the 1996 populations of numerous CAs were adjusted for comparison purposes with the 2001 populations. The 1996 adjusted populations included: 60,080 for Red Deer (boundary expanded); 31,353 for Grande Prairie (boundary expanded); 27,139 for Cold Lake (boundary reduced); and 10,093 for Brooks (newly created CA).)	Division No. 8
Medicine Hat	13,301.54	76,522	72,807	68,822	61,735	56,570	Division No. 1
Wood Buffalo	61,871.37	73,320	66,896	52,643	42,602	36,124	Division No. 16
Grande Prairie	132.73	63,166	55,655	71,868	36,983	31,140	Division No. 19
Okotoks	19.63	28,881	24,511	17,145			Division No. 6
Brooks	5,931.03	24,662	23,430	22,452	11,604		Division No. 2
Lloydminster (Note: The Lloydminster CA is split between Alberta and Saskatchewan. Only the Alberta portion is presented in this table. See list of census agglomerations in Saskatchewan for the Saskatchewan portion.)	24.04	19,645	18,032	15,910	13,148	11,317	Division No. 10
Camrose	42.62	18,743	17,286	15,620	14,854	13,728	Division No. 10
Cold Lake (Note: Prior to the 2001 census, the Cold Lake CA was named the Grand Centre CA.)	59.92	14,961	13,839	11,991	27,935	35,161	Division No. 8
High River	21.39	13,584	12,920				Division No. 6
Sylvan Lake	24.50	15,302	12,762				Division No. 8
Wetaskiwin	18.31	12,655	12,525	11,673	11,154	10,959	Division No. 11
Strathmore	27.40	13,756	12,305				Division No. 5
Canmore	69.43	13,992	12,288	12,039			Division No. 15
Lacombe	20.81	13,057	11,707				Division No. 8

== See also ==
- Census geographic units of Canada
- List of Canadian census agglomerations by province or territory
- List of census agglomerations in Canada
- List of designated places in Alberta
- List of municipalities in Alberta
- List of population centres in Alberta
