= Voice for Animals Humane Society =

Canadian non-profit organization

- Abbreviation: VAHS
- Type: Animal welfare organizations in Canada
- Legal status: active
- Purpose: advocate and public voice, educator and network
- Headquarters: Edmonton, Alberta
- Region served: Alberta and Canada
- Official language: English; French
- Website: www.v4a.org

The Voice for Animals Humane Society (V4A) in Edmonton, Alberta, is a non-profit organization dedicated to protecting animals, through advocacy and education, from neglect, abuse and exploitation. This volunteer organization helps animals of all kinds through animal rescue, education, lobbying politicians, protests, letter writing and petitions. The president, Tove Reece, has been involved in animal rights' work for over twenty years.

== Campaigns ==
=== Lucy and Samantha ===
Lucy, an Asian elephant, and Samantha, an African elephant, live at the Edmonton Valley Zoo. Lucy has arthritis and chronic foot infections. Samantha severed her trunk on a gate latch and lost 20 cm (7.9 in) of it. The Elephant Sanctuary in Hohenwald, Tennessee, agreed to take them both in 2006, and a letter writing campaign and petition were ongoing.

In 2007, Samantha was relocated to a breeding program at the North Carolina Zoo in Asheboro.

According to the Edmonton Valley Zoo in 2023, a "respiratory condition for which treatment is ongoing" means that moving Lucy to a new location would be too stressful and "life-threatening." However, they state that the long-term goal of the zoo is to not have elephants. The V4A states on their website that they are seeking an independent's expert review of Lucy's health, and say that even if she is unable to be moved her quality of life can still be improved.

Additionally, Zoocheck Canada launched a Kids Save Lucy campaign in June 2009 to help Lucy.
