= Canadian Wood Council =

Canadian trade organization for wood products industry

The Canadian Wood Council (CWC) is Canada’s unifying voice for the wood products industry. As a national federation of associations, their members represent hundreds of manufacturers across the country.
