= 2026–27 BCHC season =

Inaugural season of the BCHC

- League: BCHC
- Sport: Ice hockey
- Duration: Pre-season; 21 August–15 September; Regular season 10 September–28 February; Post-season; 5 March–16 April
- Games: 550
- Teams: 22

Seasons
- 2027–28 →

The 2026–27 BCHC season is the inaugural season of the British Columbia Hockey Conference (BCHC), a junior ice hockey league in British Columbia. The BCHC was formed in 2026 by twenty-two former KIJHL and PJHL franchises. The BC Hockey Board of Directors unanimously approved the BCHC as a member at the Junior-A level on 28 March 2026. It was a result of a comprehensive restructuring of the junior ice hockey framework that began in 2023. The inaugural campaign will feature four divisions of five to six teams each competing for the championship Mowat Cup.

== Regular season ==
Teams shall be aligned into four divisions of five or six teams each. The regular season schedule matrix was determined by a mix of the current division alignment, the division alignment originally announced by the BCHC and a desire to create regional competition and strengthen rivalries throughout the province.

Each team's schedule can be broken down as according to the following table:

2026-27 BCHC Schedule Matrix
Teams	Divisional Matchups	Conference Matchups	Non-Conference Matchups
Burnaby, Coastal, Delta, Ridge Meadows	36	14	0
Port Coquitlam, Richmond	37	13	0
Chilliwack, Langley	9	41	0
Summerland, Princeton	10	0	40
Osoyoos	8	0	42
Kamloops, Revelstoke, Merritt	24	14	12
Quesnel, Williams Lake	26	14	10
Nelson, Beaver Valley, Grand Forks	30	10	10
Kimberley, Fernie	31	10	9
Columbia Valley	32	10	8

This unusual mix of matchups was chosen due to the former PJHL clubs not normally travelling by bus and the longer distances that this new league brings provide a challenge particularly to them. This format guarantees that the former PJHL teams except Chilliwack and Langley will not travel outside of the lower mainland and those two teams will travel no further than Osoyoos.

The regular season will begin on Thursday, September 10, however most teams will begin play the following Friday.

EASTERN CONFERENCE
Interior Division
Team	City	Arena	Home Opener	First Game
Kamloops Storm	Kamloops	MacArthur Island Arena	Sep 18 V Columbia Valley	
Merritt Centennials	Merritt	Nicola Valley Memorial Arena	Sep 18 V Princeton	
Quesnel River Rush	Quesnel	West Fraser Centre	Sep 18 V Revelstoke	
Revelstoke Grizzlies	Revelstoke	Revelstoke Forum	Oct 10 V Princeton	Sep 18 @ Quesnel
Williams Lake Mustangs	Williams Lake	Cariboo Memorial Recreation Centre	Sep 25 V Nelson	
Kootenay Division
Team	City	Arena	Home Opener	First Game
Beaver Valley Nitehawks	Fruitvale	Beaver Valley Arena	Sep 19 V Fernie	
Columbia Valley Rockies	Invermere	Eddie Mountain Memorial Arena	Sep 25 V Kimberley	Sep 18 @ Kamloops
Fernie Ghostriders	Fernie	Fernie Memorial Arena	Sep 25 V Revelstoke	Sep 18 @ Grand Forks
Grand Forks Border Bruins	Grand Forks	Jack Goddard Memorial Arena	Sep 18 V Fernie	
Kimberley Dynamiters	Kimberley	Kimberley Civic Centre	Sep 26 V Revelstoke	Sep 18 @ Nelson
Nelson Leafs	Nelson	Nelson and District Community Complex	Sep 18 V Kimberley	
WESTERN CONFERENCE
Valley Division
Team	City	Arena	Home Opener	First Game
Chilliwack Jets	Chilliwack	Sardis Sports Complex	Sep 13 V Coastal	
Langley Trappers	Langley	George Preston Recreation Centre	Sep 19 V Burnaby	
Osoyoos Coyotes	Osoyoos	Osoyoos Sunbowl Arena	Sep 19 V Summerland	Sep 18 @ Summerland
Princeton Posse	Princeton	Princeton & District Multipurpose Arena	Sep 19 V Kamloops	Sep 18 @ Merritt
Summerland Jets	Summerland	Summerland Arena	Sep 18 V Osoyoos	
Mainland Division
Team	City	Arena	Home Opener	First Game
Burnaby Steelers	Burnaby	Burnaby Winter Club	Sep 20 V Ridge Meadows	Sep 19 @ Langley
Coastal Tsunami	Gibsons	Gibsons & Area Community Centre	Sep 26 V Burnaby	Sep 13 @ Chilliwack
Delta Ice Hawks	Delta	Sungod Recreation Centre	Sep 12 V Richmond	Sep 10 @ Richmond
Port Coquitlam Trailblazers	Port Coquitlam	Port Coquitlam Community Centre	Sep 18 V Chilliwack	Sep 11 @ Ridge Meadows
Richmond Sockeyes	Richmond	Minoru Arena	Sep 10 V Delta	
Ridge Meadows Flames	Maple Ridge	Planet Ice Maple Ridge/Cam Neely Arena	Sep 11 V Port Coquitlam	

=== Standings ===
2026-27 BCHC Standings
Interior Division
Team	W	L	OL	SOL	PTS	GF	GA	GD
Williams Lake Mustangs	16	3	1	0	33	91	48	43
Kamloops Storm	15	4	0	1	31	100	53	47
Merritt Centennials	11	6	2	1	25	66	61	5
Revelstoke Grizzlies	8	8	0	3	19	59	68	-9
Quesnel River Rush	6	13	2	1	15	60	108	-48
Kootenay Division
Kimberley Dynamiters	16	2	2	0	34	110	42	68
Fernie Ghostriders	13	5	0	2	28	73	46	27
Beaver Valley Nitehawks	11	7	1	2	25	79	65	5
Columbia Valley Rockies	8	11	0	0	16	75	85	-10
Nelson Leafs	6	11	1	1	14	62	97	-35
Grand Forks Border Bruins	5	15	0	0	10	61	107	-46
Mainland Division
Delta Ice Hawks	13	7	0	2	28	87	73	14
Richmond Sockeyes	13	8	0	1	27	88	73	15
Ridge Meadows Flames	12	7	1	1	26	74	67	7
Coastal Tsunami	11	8	1	0	23	82	74	8
Port Coquitlam Trailblazers	10	11	2	0	22	68	92	-24
Burnaby Steelers	3	15	1	1	8	56	103	-47
Valley Division
Langley Trappers	11	5	1	3	26	71	62	9
Chilliwack Jets	11	7	1	1	24	100	79	21
Osoyoos Coyotes	9	8	0	1	19	58	67	-9
Summerland Jets	7	9	1	1	16	43	68	-25
Princeton Posse	6	10	1	1	14	65	81	-16

x- Clinched Playoff Position. y-Clinched Division. z-Clinched Conference. p-Clinched best overall record. e-Eliminated from playoff contention. Standings last updated November 17.

In the event of a tie the following tie-break procedures shall be used until the tie is broken:

- The higher seeded team shall be the one with the greater number of games won in regulation time;
- The higher seeded team shall be the one with the greater number of games won in regulation time and overtime;
- The higher seeded team shall be the one with the greater number of games won in any manner;
- The higher seeded team shall be the one with the greater number of points earned in games against each other among two or more tied clubs;
- The higher seeded team shall be the one with the greater differential between goals for and against (including goals scored in overtime or awarded for prevailing in shootouts) for the entire regular season;
- The higher seeded team shall be the one with the greater number of goals scored (including goals scored in overtime or awarded for prevailing in shootouts) for the entire regular season;
- The higher seeded team shall be the one with the fewer number of minutes in penalties assessed for the entire regular season.

==== Division Races ====
The following is the division leader at the conclusion of each week

2026-27 BCHC Division races
Week #	Interior Division		Kootenay Division		Mainland Division		Valley Division	
Week #	Team	Points	Team	Points	Team	Points	Team	Points
1	REV, MER, QUE	3	Fernie	4	Delta	7	LAN, PRI	4
2	Quesnel	7	Fernie	8	Delta	11	Chilliwack	6
3	KAM, REV	8	Fernie	10	Ridge Meadows	14	Chiliwack	10
4	Revelstoke	14	Kimberley	13	Delta	17	LAN, CHW	12
5	Kamloops	17	Kimberley	19	Delta	19	CHW, LAN	16
6	Kamloops	21	Kimberley	21	Delta	23	CHW, LAN	17
7	Williams Lake	25	Kimberley	25	Delta	23	Langley	21
8	Williams Lake	31	Kimberley	29	Richmond	25	Langley	23
9	Williams Lake	33	Kimberley	34	Delta	28	Langley	26

=== Three Stars of the week ===
2026-27 BCHC 3 stars of the week
Week #	Forward (Team)	Defenseman (Team)	Goalie (Team)
1	Will Bell (PRI)	Noah Marshall (CHW)	Leo den Besten (FER)
2	Luca D'Amore (KAM)	Declan Pocock (WLM)	Kayd Mercier (BVN)
3	Josh Bettesworth (RMF)	Harrison Todd (CVR)	Shay McVicker (PCO)
4	Will Bell (PRI)	Crimson Chittick (BVN)	Adam Kisilevich (KIM)
5	Bryson Patkau (LAN)	James Campbell (LAN)	Brenner Fyfe (KAM)
6	Jonas Bourchier (BVN)	Maddox Popke (REV)	Rylan Harder (QUE)
7	Kaden Charpentier (WLM)	Crimson Chittick (BVN)	Gabriel Bart (GFB)
8	Logan Hauk (WLM)	Liam O'Neill (RIC)	Parker Parish (COA)
9	Evin Bossel (CVR)	Domenic Rattai (FER)	Sam Bastien (BRN)

Note: due to staggard start time for the season, week 1 was counted as September 10 to September 20. All other weeks are considered Monday to Sunday

=== Players of the month ===
2026-27 BCHC Players of the Month
Month	Forward	Defender	Goalie	Rookie
September	Luca D'Amore (KAM)	Noah Marshall (CHW)	Leo den Besten (FER)	Miller Tedesco (KIM)
October	Josh Bettesworth (RMF)	Declan Pocock (WLM)	Beckham Brossard (LAN)	Lukas Hoff (DEL)

== Prospects Game ==
After a one year hiatus the BCHC prospect game will return. The game will be played at the Sungod Arena, home of the Delta Ice Hawks, on November 24. A new format was introduced replacing the former top young KIJHL players vs the top young PJHL players, with the coaching staff drafting players to their roster from a player pool. Coaching staff was announced on October 21. Team Black's head coach will be Terry Jones of Beaver Valley, assisted by Colin Minardi of Princeton, and Greg Ross of Port Coquitlam. Team White will be coached by Jackson Playfair of Osoyoos, assisted by Chad Scharff of Fernie, and Briar McNaney of Coastal. Steve Piccolo or Beaver Valley will be the game's operations manager, with Travis Miller of Delta, Jordana Robinson of Langley, Lauren Runge, and Ashley Springle of Fernie being the event's athletic trainers. Rosters were announced November 5, players are listed with their birth year and BCHC club.

2026 BCHC Prospect Game
Team Black		Team White	
Goaltenders
Lucas Disiewich	DEL-2009	Kole Anderosov	OSO-2010
Ivan Andersen	WLM-2009	Kayd Mercier	BVN-2008
Defencemen
Logan Alexis	MER-2009	Ethan Maglio	PCO-2009
Crimson Chittick	BVN-2008	Luke Blanchard	BRN-2008
Tracen Ashley	CHW-2008	Tristan Anderlini	COA-2009
Xavier Barthe	RMF-2008	Kenneth Merriman	DEL-2009
Andrew Misson	PRI-2009	Cody Baker	RMF-2009
Ryder Dunn	DEL-2009	Nolan Murphy	NEL-2008
Forwards
Ermolai Yarygin	RIC-2009	Jevyn Gill	OSO-2009
Miller Tedesco	KIM-2008	Mattias Holte	KAM-2009
Kishan Saggu	DEL-2009	Marcus Domhof	PRI-2008
Daniel Ewert	MER-2009	Hudson Podollan	OSO-2009
Richard Wonyeneh	LAN-2009	Linden Delleman	CHW-2009
Ollie Reid	OSO-2009	Isaac Gossen	MER-2009
Eric Wagman	PRI-2008	Colton Campbell	QUE-2009
Logan Martin	CHW-2008	Tait Harris	COA-2008
Macklen Popke	REV-2008	Tyson Ekstrom	COA-2008
Brenden Roberts	WLM-2009	Lukas Hoff	DEL-2008
Kaelen Swanson	WLM-2008	Beckett Matlock	DEL-2008
Jonathan Zhang	RIC-2009	Jaiven Mann	LAN-2008

Leadership groups were announced on November 12th. Captains. Assistants.

== Playoffs ==
The top four teams in each division shall make the playoffs with first in each division playing fourth, second playing third, and the winners meeting. The Kootenay Division champion will play the Interior Division champion, while the Mainland and Valley Division champions will face off. The playoffs will begin Friday March 5. Two weeks later the division finals will begin play. April 2 will see the league semi-finals begin, and April 16 2027 will see the Mowat Cup Championship series begin. All series shall be best-of-seven.

2026-27 Divisions map
Legend
- Kootenay Division
- 1 Columbia Valley Rockies
- 2 Fernie Ghostriders
- 3 Kimberley Dynamiters
- 4 Nelson Leafs
- 5 Beaver Valley Nitehawks
- 6 Grand Forks Border Bruins
- Interior Division
- 7 Merritt Centennials
- 8 Revelstoke Grizzlies
- 9 Kamloops Storm
- 10 Williams Lake Mustangs
- 11 Quesnel River Rush
- Valley Division
- 12 Chilliwack Jets
- 13 Langley Trappers
- 14 Osoyoos Coyotes
- 15 Princeton Posse
- 16 Summerland Jets
- Mainland Division
- 17 Ridge Meadows Flames
- 18 Port Coquitlam Trailblazers
- 19 Burnaby Steelers
- 20 Delta Ice Hawks
- 21 Richmond Sockeyes
- 22 Coastal Tsunami

== Sources ==
- Henderson, Wylie (21 April 2026). "Coastal Tsunami to join new BCHC league next season". mycoastnow.com. Vista Radio.
- Rodgers, Paul (21 April 2026). "BCHC announced as new Junior A hockey league for province". Creston Valley Advance.
- "BREAKING NEWS: Merritt Centennials to join new Junior A hockey league in B.C." Q101. Pattison Media. 21 April 2026.
- Schulze, Aaron (21 April 2026). "Storm, Cents to join new Junior A hockey league in B.C." CFJC Today Kamloops. Pattison Media.
- Midzain, Teryn (21 April 2026). "B.C. unifies Junior A hockey under new provincial conference". mycariboonow.com. Vista Radio.
- Keen, Jon (22 April 2026). "New BCHC Junior "A" League Unveiled". Radio NL - Kamloops News. Stingray Radio.
- "Storm owner Kolle on B.C. Hockey Conference: 'We simply seek to be the best'". CFJC Today Kamloops. Pattison Media. 22 April 2026.
- Hastings, Marty (22 April 2026). "B.C. Hockey Conference commissioner Dubois talks new Junior A league, addresses WIJHL split". CFJC Today Kamloops. Pattison Media.
- Conti, Alyssa (24 April 2026). "Chilliwack, Langley among 22 teams joining new sanctioned BCHC Junior A hockey league". Fraser Valley Today. Pattison Media.
- McFarlane, Lexi (26 May 2026). "New owners for Osoyoos Coyotes as Junior 'A' hockey on a powerplay". pentictonwesternnews.com.
- Jordan, Malin (18 June 2026). "Brien Gemmell named head coach and assistant GM of Richmond Sockeyes". Surrey Now-Leader.
- Jordan, Malin (25 June 2026). "Former Cloverdale HC manager looks forward to competing in new Junior A league". Surrey Now-Leader.
- White, Roger (10 July 2026). "Merritt Centennials name Henry Acres as new Head Coach of BCHC franchise". Q101. Pattison Media.
- Brown, Kate (16 July 2026). "British Columbia Hockey Conference and PJHL announce player development agreement". myeastkootenaynow.com. Vista Radio.
- "BCHC releases inaugural season, playoff schedule and division alignment". castanet.net. 1 August 2026.
- "A New Chapter Begins: BCHC Drops the Puck on Inaugural Season". bchchockey.ca. British Columbia Hockey Conference. 10 September 2026.
- Lockhart, Logan (11 September 2026). "Princeton Posse head coach 'really impressed' by team ahead of inaugural BCHC season". The Similkameen Spotlight.
