= Queen's Park Arena =

Multi-use arena in New Westminster

- Interactive map of Queen's Park Arena
- Location: New Westminster, British Columbia
- Coordinates: 49.2149°N 122.9058°W
- Operator: City of New Westminster
- Capacity: ~3500
- Type: Lacrosse, Hockey

Construction
- Built: 1930; 96 years ago

Tenants
- New Westminster Salmonbellies (WLA) 1930–present New Westminster Bruins (WHL) 1971–81, 1983–88

Queen's Park Arena is a 3,500 seat multi-use arena located within Queen's Park in New Westminster, British Columbia.

The arena was built in 1930 and opened on September 19. In its time, the Queen's Park Arena hosted the New Westminster Bruins of the Western Hockey League and British Columbia Junior Hockey League teams the New Westminster Royals and the Royal City Outlaws. It has hosted the New Westminster Lacrosse teams for more than 75 years, including the multi-Mann Cup champion New Westminster Salmonbellies of the Western Lacrosse Association.

The Arena has hosted the Mann Cup Finals a total of 21 times, the first in 1933 and the latest in 2025. The hosts have won 12 cups on home soil.

The arena was also home to the professional New Westminster Royals, which played in the Pacific Coast Hockey League from 1945 to 1952 and the Western Hockey League from 1952 to 1959. In 1949, team director Doug Grimston insisted on the continuation of a smoking ban at the arena, and stated that he would take financial responsibility for lost attendance.

In 1967, the arena was used to hold a session of the British Columbia Legislative Assembly, to commemorate the 100th anniversary of the Mainland and Vancouver Island colonies uniting.

For 3 years between 1999 and 2002, the Queen's Park Pirates of the PIJHL, now the PJHL, were tenants, but the team relocated to North Delta, and eventually became the modern Surrey Knights.

The SFU BCIHL hockey team plays a few games at Queen's Park, as its co-home arena alongside Bill Copeland Centre in Burnaby. In the 2025-26 season, it hosted two games, both loses, as well as the league finals, which was won by Vancouver Island University.

On January 18th, 2026, the Burnaby Steelers hosted the Ridge Meadows Flames for a one off PJHL game, marking the first time in over 20 years that junior hockey was played at the arena.
