= Brent Hughes (ice hockey, born 1966) =

Canadian ice hockey player and coach

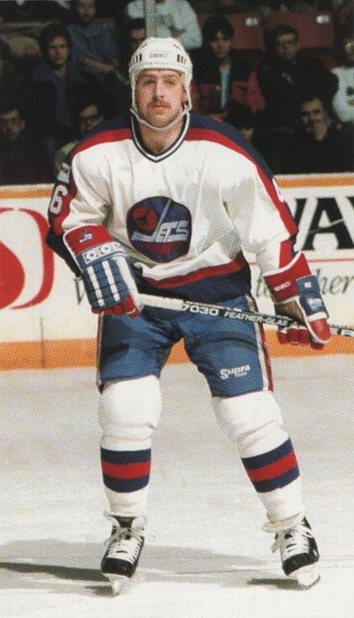
- Born: April 5, 1966 (age 60) New Westminster, British Columbia, Canada
- Height: 5 ft 11 in (180 cm)
- Weight: 195 lb (88 kg; 13 st 13 lb)
- Position: Left wing
- Shot: Left
- Played for: Winnipeg Jets; Boston Bruins; Buffalo Sabres; New York Islanders
- NHL draft: Undrafted
- Playing career: 1987–1999

Brent Allen Hughes (born April 5, 1966) is a Canadian ice hockey coach and former professional left winger. He played in the National Hockey League for the Winnipeg Jets, Boston Bruins, Buffalo Sabres, and New York Islanders. Head Coach for the Pacific Junior hockey league, Ridge Meadows Flames.

== Career ==
In his NHL career, Hughes played in 357 games, scoring 41 goals and 39 assists. He later worked as the head coach of the Austin Ice Bats of the Central Hockey League until that team ended its operations in 2008. On February 19, 2009, he was hired by the Corpus Christi IceRays as their new head coach. He's currently the head coach of the Ridge Meadows Flames Junior A Pacific Junior Hockey League Hockey Club in British Columbia. He is a three time Champion as Head Coach of Ridge Meadows Flames.

== Career statistics ==
=== Regular season and playoffs ===
			Regular season					Playoffs
Season	Team	League	GP	G	A	Pts	PIM	GP	G	A	Pts	PIM
1983–84	New Westminster Bruins	WHL	67	21	18	39	133	9	2	2	4	27
1984–85	New Westminster Bruins	WHL	64	25	32	57	135	11	2	1	3	37
1985–86	New Westminster Bruins	WHL	71	28	52	80	180	—	—	—	—	—
1986–87	New Westminster Bruins	WHL	8	5	4	9	22	—	—	—	—	—
1986–87	Victoria Cougars	WHL	61	38	61	99	146	5	4	1	5	8
1987–88	Moncton Hawks	AHL	73	13	19	32	206	—	—	—	—	—
1988–89	Winnipeg Jets	NHL	28	3	2	5	82	—	—	—	—	—
1988–89	Moncton Hawks	AHL	54	34	34	68	286	10	9	4	13	40
1989–90	Winnipeg Jets	NHL	11	1	2	3	33	—	—	—	—	—
1989–90	Moncton Hawks	AHL	65	31	29	60	277	—	—	—	—	—
1990–91	Moncton Hawks	AHL	63	21	22	43	144	3	0	0	0	7
1991–92	Boston Bruins	NHL	8	1	1	2	38	10	2	0	2	20
1991–92	Baltimore Skipjacks	AHL	55	25	29	54	190	—	—	—	—	—
1991–92	Maine Mariners	AHL	12	6	4	10	34	—	—	—	—	—
1992–93	Boston Bruins	NHL	62	5	4	9	191	1	0	0	0	2
1993–94	Boston Bruins	NHL	77	13	11	24	143	13	2	1	3	27
1993–94	Providence Bruins	AHL	6	2	5	7	4	—	—	—	—	—
1994–95	Boston Bruins	NHL	44	6	6	12	139	5	0	0	0	4
1995–96	Buffalo Sabres	NHL	76	5	10	15	148	—	—	—	—	—
1996–97	New York Islanders	NHL	51	7	3	10	57	—	—	—	—	—
1996–97	Utah Grizzlies	IHL	5	2	2	4	11	—	—	—	—	—
1997–98	Houston Aeros	IHL	79	19	12	31	128	4	0	3	3	20
1998–99	Houston Aeros	IHL	29	4	2	6	87	—	—	—	—	—
1998–99	Utah Grizzlies	IHL	51	13	11	24	80	—	—	—	—	—
NHL totals			357	41	39	80	831	29	4	1	5	53

== Awards ==
- WHL West First All-Star Team – 1987
- PJHL Stonehouse Cup - 2024, 2025, 2026 with The Ridge Meadows Flames
