= John Craighead =

American ice hockey player (born 1971)

- Born: November 23, 1971 (age 54) Richmond, Virginia, U.S.
- Height: 6 ft 1 in (185 cm)
- Weight: 200 lb (91 kg; 14 st 4 lb)
- Position: Right wing
- Shot: Right
- Played for: Toronto Maple Leafs; Nürnberg Ice Tigers; Revier Löwen Oberhausen; Nottingham Panthers; Cardiff Devils
- NHL draft: Undrafted
- Playing career: 1991–2005

John Craighead (born November 23, 1971) is an American former professional ice hockey right winger and enforcer. He played for the Toronto Maple Leafs during 1996–97 season, and for various minor league teams in North America and Europe from 1997 to 2005. He holds the Deutsche Eishockey Liga record for penalty minutes for the Thomas Sabo Ice Tigers.

== Career statistics ==
			Regular season					Playoffs
Season	Team	League	GP	G	A	Pts	PIM	GP	G	A	Pts	PIM
1989–90	Ladner Penguins	BCJHL	11	4	2	6	38	—	—	—	—	—
1990–91	New Westminster Royals	BCJHL	3	0	0	0	12	—	—	—	—	—
1991–92	Surrey Eagles	BCJHL	13	7	6	13	38	—	—	—	—	—
1991–92	Chilliwack Chiefs	BCJHL	25	12	16	28	116	—	—	—	—	—
1992–93	West Palm Beach Blaze	SuHL	36	12	9	21	158	4	4	2	6	4
1992–93	Johnstown Chiefs	ECHL	1	0	2	2	17	—	—	—	—	—
1992–93	Louisville Icehawks	ECHL	5	1	0	1	33	—	—	—	—	—
1993–94	Huntington Blizzard	ECHL	9	4	2	6	44	—	—	—	—	—
1993–94	Richmond Renegades	ECHL	28	18	12	30	89	—	—	—	—	—
1994–95	Detroit Vipers	IHL	44	5	7	12	285	3	0	1	1	4
1995–96	Detroit Vipers	IHL	63	7	9	16	368	10	2	3	5	28
1996–97	Toronto Maple Leafs	NHL	5	0	0	0	10	—	—	—	—	—
1996–97	St. John's Maple Leafs	AHL	53	9	10	19	318	7	1	1	2	22
1997–98	Cleveland Lumberjacks	IHL	49	9	7	16	233	—	—	—	—	—
1997–98	Quebec Rafales	IHL	13	2	2	4	73	—	—	—	—	—
1998–99	Nürnberg Ice Tigers	DEL	34	4	6	10	144	13	1	4	5	60
1999–00	Nürnberg Ice Tigers	DEL	50	14	15	29	171	9	6	3	9	37
2000–01	Nürnberg Ice Tigers	DEL	49	7	11	18	152	4	0	0	0	12
2001–02	Revier Löwen Oberhausen	DEL	49	10	12	22	226	—	—	—	—	—
2002–03	Manitoba Moose	AHL	47	5	10	15	109	14	0	2	2	32
2003–04	Nottingham Panthers	EIHL	54	39	30	69	182	6	5	1	6	8
2004–05	Nottingham Panthers	EIHL	9	0	0	0	20	—	—	—	—	—
2004–05	Cardiff Devils	EIHL	16	5	8	13	20	10	5	5	10	36
DEL totals			182	35	44	79	693	26	7	7	14	109
NHL totals			5	0	0	0	10	—	—	—	—	—

== Post-retirement ==
On September 24, 2015, as Head Coach and part-owner of the then-Langley Knights, a Junior B team in the PJHL, an altercation behind the opposing Mission City Outlaws bench resulted in Craighead being suspended for six years by governing body BC Hockey. Hockey Canada later reduced Craighead's suspension to two years as owner, and three years as coach. During the incident, Craighead entered the Mission City Outlaws bench to confront its coach during a bench-clearing brawl. Craighead claimed that he was attempting to de-escalate the situation. A Mission City Outlaws player claimed that he was assaulted by Craighead while trying to separate the coaches. The Mission City Outlaws coach was issued a ten-game suspension and his team was fined CA$2,500. Players on both teams received multi-game suspensions.

Craighead returned as Head Coach in the 2018–2019 season after Hockey Canada reduced his suspension to three years. Following the decision from Hockey Canada, the PJHL initiated proceedings to expel the Craighead's team from the league. Craighead successfully petitioned the BC Supreme Court to order PJHL to cease its disciplinary proceedings and take no further action against the team and its owners. The decision was later upheld by the Court of Appeal.

On March 3, 2023, Craighead was involved in an altercation with a referee while playing beer league hockey. The referee alleged that Craighead assaulted him; first as he was attempting to break up a fight between Craighead and another player, then Craighead allegedly followed the referee to his dressing room where he punched him in the face and pulled his jersey over his head. Craighead stated that these claims were “a defamation of character, propaganda, and are being made because of his race.”

== See also ==
- List of black NHL players
- Fighting in ice hockey
- Violence in ice hockey
