= British Columbia Hockey Conference =

Ice hockey league in British Columbia, Canada

- Current season or competition: 2026–27 BCHC season
- Countries: Canada
- Commissioner: Jeff Dubois
- Founded: 2026
- First season: 2026–27
- Divisions: Interior; Kootenay; Valley; Mainland
- No. of teams: 22
- Website: bchchockey.ca

The British Columbia Hockey Conference (BCHC) is a junior ice hockey league with 22 clubs in British Columbia. Its inaugural season ran from 2026–27.

The league was formed in 2026 by former franchises of the Pacific Junior Hockey League (PJHL) and the defunct Kootenay International Junior Hockey League (KIJHL).

== History ==
=== BCHL departure from CJHL and Hockey Canada ===
In 2021, the British Columbia Hockey League (BCHL), the top Junior A league in British Columbia, announced their departure from the Canadian Junior Hockey League (CJHL).

In May 2023, the BCHL announced that they would be splitting from Hockey Canada and becoming an independent league. The decision was made as the league was looking to attract 16- and 17-year-old players who were capable of playing Major Junior but wanted to retain their NCAA eligibility. The BCHL's departure from Hockey Canada sanctioned competition meant that British Columbia was without a sanctioned Hockey Canada Junior A league.

=== KIJHL and PJHL ===
In 2022, the Kootenay International Junior Hockey League (KIJHL) and Pacific Junior Hockey League (PJHL), two Junior B leagues, formed an organization called the British Columbia Hockey Conference (BCHC) to coordinate a joint player safety department and a top prospects game between the two leagues.

In December 2023, BC Hockey began the process of restructuring Junior A hockey in British Columbia. The three Junior B leagues (PJHL, KIJHL and VIJHL) were designated as "Junior A Tier 2", with plans to evaluate teams seeking to be promoted to "Junior A Tier 1".

On March 18, 2025, the PJHL announced that for the 2025–26 season, the league would split into two, with seven teams in Junior A Tier 1 and eight in Junior A Tier 2. This proposal was rejected by a vote of member clubs, but the league realigned its divisions along the lines of the proposed split.

=== Formation of league ===
On April 21, 2026, the BC Hockey, along with the KIJHL and PJHL, announced the launch of the British Columbia Hockey Conference as a sanctioned Junior A league. The league will start in 2026–27, and feature 22 teams split into three divisions. The KIJHL will cease to exist following the departure of 14 teams to the BCHC after losing eight teams to the new Western International Junior Hockey League (WIJHL) earlier in 2026. The BCHC plans to apply for membership to the CJHL to bring British Columbia back into the national system of Junior A.

== Teams ==
The 2026–27 BCHC season will feature 22 teams in four divisions.

2026-27 Divisions map
Legend
- Kootenay Division
- 1 Columbia Valley Rockies
- 2 Fernie Ghostriders
- 3 Kimberley Dynamiters
- 4 Nelson Leafs
- 5 Beaver Valley Nitehawks
- 6 Grand Forks Border Bruins
- Interior Division
- 7 Merritt Centennials
- 8 Revelstoke Grizzlies
- 9 Kamloops Storm
- 10 Williams Lake Mustangs
- 11 Quesnel River Rush
- Valley Division
- 12 Chilliwack Jets
- 13 Langley Trappers
- 14 Osoyoos Coyotes
- 15 Princeton Posse
- 16 Summerland Jets
- Mainland Division
- 17 Ridge Meadows Flames
- 18 Port Coquitlam Trailblazers
- 19 Burnaby Steelers
- 20 Delta Ice Hawks
- 21 Richmond Sockeyes
- 22 Coastal Tsunami

Interior Division
Team	City	Arena	Founded	Joined
Kamloops Storm	Kamloops	MacArthur Island Arena	1976	2026
Merritt Centennials	Merritt	Nicola Valley Memorial Arena	1961	2026
Quesnel River Rush	Quesnel	West Fraser Centre	2009	2026
Revelstoke Grizzlies	Revelstoke	Revelstoke Forum	1993	2026
Williams Lake Mustangs	Williams Lake	Cariboo Memorial Recreation Centre	2011	2026
Kootenay Division
Team	City	Arena	Founded	Joined
Beaver Valley Nitehawks	Fruitvale	Beaver Valley Arena	1981	2026
Columbia Valley Rockies	Invermere	Eddie Mountain Memorial Arena	1978	2026
Fernie Ghostriders	Fernie	Fernie Memorial Arena	1991	2026
Grand Forks Border Bruins	Grand Forks	Jack Goddard Memorial Arena	1967	2026
Kimberley Dynamiters	Kimberley	Kimberley Civic Centre	1972	2026
Nelson Leafs	Nelson	Nelson and District Community Complex	1965	2026
Valley Division
Team	City	Arena	Founded	Joined
Chilliwack Jets	Chilliwack	Sardis Sports Complex	2020	2026
Langley Trappers	Langley	George Preston Recreation Centre	2017	2026
Princeton Posse	Princeton	Princeton & District Multipurpose Arena	1993	2026
Osoyoos Coyotes	Osoyoos	Osoyoos Sunbowl Arena	2010	2026
Summerland Jets	Summerland	Summerland Arena	2026	2026
Mainland Division
Team	City	Arena	Founded	Joined
Burnaby Steelers	Burnaby	Burnaby Winter Club	1967	2026
Coastal Tsunami	Gibsons	Gibsons & Area Community Centre	2024	2026
Delta Ice Hawks	Delta	Sungod Recreation Centre	1997	2026
Port Coquitlam Trailblazers	Port Coquitlam	Port Coquitlam Community Centre	2023	2026
Richmond Sockeyes	Richmond	Minoru Arena	1972	2026
Ridge Meadows Flames	Maple Ridge	Planet Ice Maple Ridge/Cam Neely Arena	1972	2026

== Playoff Structure ==
The top four teams from each division will qualify for the 2027 BCHC Playoffs, with four best-of-seven rounds determining the first-ever BCHC Provincial Junior A Champion.

Teams will compete within their divisions through the opening two rounds of the postseason. Following the division playoffs, the League Semi-Finals will feature:

- Mainland Division Champion vs. Valley Division Champion
- Interior Division Champion vs. Kootenay Division Champion

The winners of those series will advance to the 2027 Mowat Cup Final, where the BCHC champion will be crowned.
