= Port Moody Panthers =

Ice hockey team in Port Moody

- City: Port Moody
- League: Pacific Junior Hockey League
- Conference: Tom Shaw
- Founded: 1999
- Home arena: Port Moody Arena
- Colours: Maroon, white and black
- General manager: Brian Wiebe
- Head coach: Declan Lau

Franchise history
- 1999–2006: Port Coquitlam Buckaroos
- 2006–2012: Port Moody Black Panthers
- 2012–present: Port Moody Panthers

The Port Moody Panthers are a Junior ice hockey team in the Pacific Junior Hockey League (PIJHL) based in Port Moody, British Columbia. The Panthers play their home games at the Port Moody Recreation Complex arena.

== History ==
The team was founded in Port Coquitlam as the Port Coquitlam Buckeroos until its relocation to Port Moody in 2006.

In 2025, the league announced plans to promote the Chilliwack Jets, Coastal Tsunami, Delta Ice Hawks, Grandview Steelers, Langley Trappers, Richmond Sockeyes and Ridge Meadows Flames to a new Tier 1 division beginning in the 2025–26 season. Under the plan, the Abbotsford Pilots, Aldergrove Ironmen, Mission City Outlaws, North Vancouver Wolf Pack, Port Coquitlam Trailblazers, Port Moody Panthers, Surrey Knights and White Rock Whalers would remain as Tier 2, as well as a planned expansion team to be based in Cloverdale. However, when the plan was put to the franchise owners for a vote, it failed to pass by the required two-thirds majority, with 8 members voting for and 7 voting against. The vote was divided between the franchises that had been selected for promotion, who voted in favour of the motion, and those not selected for promotion, who voted against it.

The Panthers qualified for their first postseason since 2012, due to the introduction of a new format where every team gets in, no matter their record. As the 6th placed team, Port Moody will play the Mission City Outlaws in the first round.

== Season-by-season record ==
Note: GP = Games played, W = Wins, L = Losses, T = Ties, OTL = Overtime Losses, Pts = Points, GF = Goals for, GA = Goals against

Season	GP	W	L	T	OTL	Pts	GF	GA	Finish	Playoffs
Port Coquitlam Buckaroos
1999-00	42	21	21	0	-	42	170	166	3rd, PIJHL	Lost in semifinals, 1-3 (Steelers)
2000-01	42	26					180	123	1st, PIJHL	Lost in Finals, 1-4 (Ice Hawks)
2001-02	42	20	14	6	2	48	168	145	3rd, PIJHL	Lost in semifinals, 1-4 (Ice Hawks)
2002-03	42	15	23	3	1	34	124	143	6th, PIJHL	Lost in quarterfinals, 2-4 (Pilots)
2003-04	42	25	13	2	2	54	192	152	3rd, PIJHL	Lost in semi-finals, 3-4 Richmond Sockeyes
2004-05	48	24	19	3	2	53	201	199	5th, PIJHL	Lost in semifinals, 0-4 (Pilots)
2005-06	48	12	29	4	3	31	174	226	8th, PIJHL	Lost in quarterfinals, 0-4 (Ice Hawks)
Port Moody Black Panthers
2006-07	48	6	36	4	2	18	137	239	8th, PIJHL	Lost in quarterfinals, 1-4 (Pilots)
2007-08	48	23	24	-	1	47	191	189	5th, PIJHL	Lost in quarterfinals, 2-4 (Flames)
2008-09	48	18	25	-	5	41	197	215	3rd, Harold Brittain	Won div. quarterfinals, 4-3(Kodiaks); Lost div. finals, 3-4 (Pilots)
2009-10	48	11	36	-	1	23	136	231	5th, Harold Brittain	Did not qualify
2010-11	46	22	18	-	6	50	164	182	2nd, Harold Brittain	Won div. quarterfinals, 4-3(Flames); Lost div. finals, 3-4 (Pilots)
2011-12	44	11	28	1	4	27	164	182	3rd, Harold Brittain	Lost div. semifinals, 0-4 (Pilots)
Port Moody Panthers
2012-13	44	6	36	0	2	14	96	245	5th, Harold Brittain	Did not qualify
2013-14	44	10	30	2	2	24	115	202	5th, Harold Brittain	Did not qualify
2014-15	44	6	35	0	3	15	115	215	5th, Tom Shaw	Did not qualify
2015-16	44	11	28	3	2	27	120	171	5th, Tom Shaw	Did not qualify
2016-17	44	16	27	0	1	33	137	193	5th, Tom Shaw	Did not qualify
2017-18	44	12	29	0	3	27	122	182	5th of 5, Tom Shaw	Did not qualify
2018-19	44	15	26	1	1	32	122	172	5th of 6, Tom Shaw; 9th of 12 PJHL	Did not qualify
2019-20	44	11	31	2	0	24	102	228	6th of 6, Tom Shaw; 11th of 12 PJHL	Did not qualify
2020-21	Season cancelled									
2021-22	44	3	41	0	0	6	126	270	6th of 6, Tom Shaw; 13th of 13 PJHL	Did not qualify
2022-23	48	17	30	1	0	35	145	206	6th of 6, Tom Shaw; 10th of 13 PJHL	Did not qualify
2023-24	48	16	27	3	2	37	138	189	6th of 7, Tom Shaw; 10th of 14 PJHL	Did not qualify
2024-25	48	12	32	2	2	28	149	276	8th of 8, Tom Shaw; 13th of 15 PJHL	Did not qualify
2025-26	44	22	21	0	1	45	161	165	6th of 8, Harold Brittain 10th of 16 PJHL	

== NHL alumni ==
- Colin Fraser
- Zach Hamill
- Andrew Ladd
- Jeff Tambellini
- David Jones

== Awards and trophies ==
Best Defenceman

- Matt Creechan: 2001-02
- Chris Stew: 2010-11

== Team captains ==
- Nick Farina: 2000–01
- Matt Creechan: 2001–02
- Justin Boyd: 2005–06
- Chris Boechler: 2006–07
- Sean Docherty: 2007–08
- Carson Bradshaw: 2008–09
- Chris Stew: 2009–11
- Cameron Patterson: 2011–12
- Martin Campbell: 2012–13
- James Jerczynski: 2014–16
- Alexander McGovern: 2017–18
- Michael Milosavljevic: 2018–20
- Jayson Beauregard: 2020–21
- Daniel Dalla Pace: 2021–2023
- Connor Hughes: 2023-2024
- Ryan Sam: 2024-2026
