= Aldergrove Ironmen =

Junior ice hockey team

- City: Aldergrove, British Columbia
- League: PJHL
- Conference: Harold Brittain
- Founded: 2008
- Home arena: Aldergrove Community Centre
- Colours
- General manager: Ben Crotenko
- Head coach: Matt Gauld
- Website: ironmen.pjhl.hockeytech.com

Franchise history
- 2008–2025: Aldergrove Kodiaks
- Since 2025: Aldergrove Ironmen

Championships
- League: 2010; 2014; 2017

The Aldergrove Ironmen is a junior ice hockey franchise in the Pacific Junior Hockey League (PJHL) based in Aldergrove, British Columbia. The team plays its home games at the 600-seat Aldergrove Credit Union Community Centre arena.

== History ==
The team originally was known as the Aldergrove Kodiaks when it debuted as an expansion franchise in 2008. In its PJHL history, the team has won the PJHL championship three times, in 2010, 2014 and 2017. In 2012–13, the Kodiaks won the Brittain Conference title and qualified for the PJHL finals, where they lost to the Richmond Sockeyes.

The 2024–25 PJHL season saw the Kodiaks lose all 48 of their regular season games becoming the first team in PJHL history to record a season without a single point in the standings.

In 2025, following a change in ownership, the franchise overhauled its coaching staff and rebranded as the Aldergrove Ironmen.

In 2025, the league announced plans to promote the Chilliwack Jets, Coastal Tsunami, Delta Ice Hawks, Grandview Steelers, Langley Trappers, Richmond Sockeyes and Ridge Meadows Flames to a new Tier 1 division beginning in the 2025–26 season. Under the plan, the Abbotsford Pilots, Aldergrove Ironmen, Mission City Outlaws, North Vancouver Wolf Pack, Port Coquitlam Trailblazers, Port Moody Panthers, Surrey Knights and White Rock Whalers would remain as Tier 2, as well as a planned expansion team to be based in Cloverdale. However, when the plan was put to the franchise owners for a vote, it failed to pass by the required two-thirds majority, with 8 members voting for and 7 voting against. The vote was divided between the franchises that had been selected for promotion, who voted in favour of the motion, and those not selected for promotion, who voted against it.

Statistics
Season	GP	W	L	OTL	Pts	GF	GA	Finish	Playoffs
2008–09	48	23	22	3	49	161	187	2nd, Harold Brittain	Lost Div. Semifinals, 3-4 (Black Panthers)
2009–10	48	25	20	3	53	186	160	2nd, Harold Brittain	Won Div. SemiFinal, 4-1 (Pilots); Won Div. Finals, 4-0 (Flames); Won League Finals, 4-2 (Ice Hawks); PIJHL Champions
2010–11	46	15	22	9	39	145	192	5th, Harold Brittain	Did not qualify
2011–12	44	28	13	1	2	59	186	1st, Harold Brittain	Won Div. SemiFinal, 4-2 (Flames); Lost in Conference Finals, 2-4 (Pilots)
2012–13	44	28	15	1	57	173	126	2nd, Harold Brittain	Won Div. SemiFinal, 4-1 (Flames); Won Div. Finals, 4-1 (Pilots); Lost League Finals, 0-4 (Sockeyes)
2013–14	44	34	6	4	72	217	118	1st, Harold Brittain	Won Div. SemiFinal, 4-0 (Outlaws); Won Div. Finals, 4-1 (Pilots); Won League Finals, 4-3 (Sockeyes); PIJHL Champions
2014–15	44	22	14	2	52	168	163	1st, Harold Brittain	Won Div. SemiFinal, 4-3 (Pilots); Lost Div. Finals, 1-4 (Outlaws)
2015–16	44	24	17	3	51	175	156	3rd, Harold Brittain	Lost Div. SemiFinal, 2-4 (Pilots)
2016–17	43	36	7	0	72	213	113	1st, Harold Brittain	Won Div. SemiFinal, 4-1 (Outlaws); Won Div Final, 4-0 (Flames); Won League Finals, 4-2 (Ice Hawks); PIJHL Champions
2017–18	44	17	24	3	37	157	165	4th, Harold Brittain	Lost Div. SemiFinal, 1-4 (Flames)
2018–19	44	22	21	1	45	141	140	3rd of 6, Harold Brittain; 7th of 12 PJHL	Lost Quarterfinal, 3-4 (Ice Hawks)
2019–20	44	25	15	4	54	160	139	2nd of 6, Harold Brittain; 5th of 12 PJHL	Won Div. SemiFinal, 4-0 (Flames); Won Div Final, 4-1 (Outlaws); Finals Cancelled due to COVID-19 Virus
2021–22	44	21	20	3	45	173	166	5th of 7, Harold Brittain; 9th of 13 PJHL	Did not qualify
2022–23	48	10	36	2	22	106	205	6th of 7, Harold Brittain; 12th of 13 PJHL	Did not qualify
2023–24	48	6	39	3	15	87	258	7th of 7, Harold Brittain; 13th of 14 PJHL	Did not qualify
2024–25	48	0	48	0	0	60	348	7th of 7, Harold Brittain; 14th of 14 PJHL	Did not qualify
2025–26	44	1	43	0	2	67	295	8th in division 16th overall	Lost against White Rock (4:0)

Source: "Standings". pjhl.net. Pacific Junior Hockey League.

== Provincial championships ==
Season	Round Robin	Record	Standing	SemiFinal	Bronze Medal Game	Gold Medal Game
2010	Tie, Revelstoke 3-3; L, Peninsula 1-2; L, Oceanside 0-2	0-2-1	3 of 4	n/a	W, Oceanside 5-4; Bronze Medal	n/a
2014	L, Beaver Valley 1-4; W, Victoria 4-1; W, Nelson 2-1	2-1-0	2 of 4	n/a	n/a	L, Beaver Valley 5-2; Silver Medal
2017	L, Creston Valley 0-2; W, Beaver Valley 5-3; OTL, Campbell River 1-2	1-1-1	3 of 4	n/a	L, Creston Valley 0-3	n/a

== Awards and trophies ==
PIJHL Championship

- 2009-10; 2013–14; 2016–17

Executive of the Year

- Rick Harkins: 2009-10

Most Inspirational Player

- Chris Price: 2009-10
