= Abbotsford Pilots =

- City: Abbotsford, British Columbia
- League: Pacific Junior Hockey League
- Conference: Harold Brittain
- Founded: 1975
- Home arena: MSA Arena
- Colours: Silver; Black; Blue
- General manager: Jack Goeson
- Head coach: Jarrett Craig
- Website: abbotsfordpilots.com

Franchise history
- 1975–1988: Mission Pilots
- 1988–present: Abbotsford Pilots

The Abbotsford Pilots are a Junior ice hockey team based in Abbotsford, British Columbia. They are members of the Harold Brittain Conference of the Pacific Junior Hockey League (PJHL). The Pilots play their home games at MSA Arena.

== History ==
=== Mission Pilots, 1975–1988 ===
The Mission Pilots were formed in 1975, and played in Mission for thirteen years, when they relocated south to Abbotsford, where the team name was retained. While in Mission, the team won no league championships. They played out of the Mission Arena on 7th avenue.

=== Abbotsford Pilots, 1988–present ===
In 1988 the Mission Pilots relocated to Abbotsford, retaining the name, which was a name similar to that of the Abbotsford Flyers, a former Junior A level team in Abbotsford, that in itself was named for the Abbotsford International Airshow. In 1989, the Pilots won the league championship in only their second season in Abbotsford. The team suffered a 3-1 finals loss to the Richmond Sockeyes in the 1991-92 season, and did not win another championship until 1999, ten years after their first. The following year, the Pilots swept the Grandview Steelers to win the league championship, with player Brock Currie leading the league in scoring, and continued their success by winning the 2000 Cyclone Taylor Cup, and finished as consolation champions in the Keystone Cup. The following year the Pilots finished a disappointing fourth in the league, and lost in the league quarterfinals to the Sockeyes. But they rebounded the following year, winning the league again over the Delta Ice Hawks in the finals, before losing to the Sicamous Eagles in the final of the Cyclone Taylor Cup. Kiyomi Parsons was named league MVP. The following year, 2002-03, the Pilots finished first during the regular season, but lost 4-3 in the league finals to the Sockeyes again. In 2003-04, the Pilots slipped to fifth in the league standings, and did not win any trophies during the season, despite having a winning record of 22-18-2. They rebounded again the following year, defeating the Delta Ice Hawks in the final by a series score of 4-3, with Abbotsford goalie Travis Dyck being named league MVP.

In 2005-06, the Pilots lost twice to the Ice Hawks, once in the league finals, and again in the Cyclone Taylor Cup championship. The following year the Pilots finished first in the league again, and defeated the Grandview Steelers by a score of 4-2 in the finals. They would win the league's regular season title again the following year, but lost to Grandview in the playoff championship by a score of 4-1. They would then lose in the league final three of the next four years, save for a first round loss to Aldergrove in 2009-10. In 2010-11, despite losing narrowly to the Ice Hawks in the finals again, the Pilots won the Cyclone Taylor Cup over the Victoria Cougars, and then crushed the Thunder Bay Northern Hawks in the final of the 2011 Keystone Cup to claim their first Western Canada championship. The following year they would win the Harold Brittain Division, but lost in the second round of the playoffs to the Aldergrove Kodiaks. They would lose to the Kodiaks in the second round for three straight years, including a Game 7 loss as heavy underdogs in 2014-15. In the 2015-16 season, the Pilots defeated the Kodiaks in the first round, before losing in the second round to eventual league champions Mission City Outlaws.

In 2025, the league announced plans to promote the Chilliwack Jets, Coastal Tsunami, Delta Ice Hawks, Grandview Steelers, Langley Trappers, Richmond Sockeyes and Ridge Meadows Flames to a new Tier 1 division beginning in the 2025–26 season. Under the plan, the Abbotsford Pilots, Aldergrove Ironmen, Mission City Outlaws, North Vancouver Wolf Pack, Port Coquitlam Trailblazers, Port Moody Panthers, Surrey Knights and White Rock Whalers would remain as Tier 2, as well as a planned expansion team to be based in Cloverdale. However, when the plan was put to the franchise owners for a vote, it failed to pass by the required two-thirds majority, with 8 members voting for and 7 voting against. The vote was divided between the franchises that had been selected for promotion, who voted in favour of the motion, and those not selected for promotion, who voted against it.

== Season-by-season record ==
Note: GP = Games played, W = Wins, L = Losses, T = Ties, OT = Overtime Losses, Shootout losses & Ties Pts = Points, GF = Goals for, GA = Goals against

| Season | GP | W | L | OT | Pts | GF | GA | Finish | Playoffs |
|---|---|---|---|---|---|---|---|---|---|
| 1999-00 | 42 | 31 | 8 | 3 | 63 | 215 | 149 | 1st, PIJHL | PIJHL Champions, 4-0 (Steelers); Cyclone Taylor Cup Champions, 2-0 (Leafs); Keystone Cup Consolation Champions |
| 2000-01 | 42 | 18 | 14 | 10 | 46 | 157 | 147 | 4th, PIJHL | Lost in Quarterfinals, 0-3 (Sockeyes) |
| 2001-02 | 42 | 31 | 7 | 4 | 66 | 240 | 129 | 1st, PIJHL | PIJHL Champions, 4-0 (Ice Hawks); Cyclone Taylor Cup Runners-Up, 0-2 (Eagles) |
| 2002-03 | 42 | 26 | 12 | 4 | 56 | 174 | 129 | 1st, PIJHL | Lost in Finals, 3-4 (Sockeyes) |
| 2003-04 | 42 | 22 | 18 | 2 | 46 | 220 | 160 | 5th, PIJHL | |
| 2004-05 | 48 | 33 | 9 | 6 | 72 | 195 | 118 | 1st, PIJHL | PIJHL Champions, 4-3 (Ice Hawks) |
| 2005-06 | 48 | 32 | 12 | 4 | 68 | 205 | 121 | 2nd, PIJHL | Lost in Finals, 2-4 (Ice Hawks); Cyclone Taylor Cup Runners-Up (Ice Hawks) |
| 2006-07 | 48 | 31 | 13 | 4 | 66 | 222 | 151 | 1st, PIJHL | PIJHL Champions, 4-2 (Steelers) |
| 2007-08 | 48 | 37 | 9 | 2 | 76 | 220 | 152 | 1st, PIJHL | Lost in Finals, 1-4 (Steelers) |
| 2008-09 | 48 | 33 | 13 | 2 | 68 | 217 | 164 | 1st, Brittain | Lost in Finals, 1-4 (Sockeyes) |
| 2009-10 | 48 | 24 | 20 | 4 | 52 | 191 | 166 | 3rd, Brittain | Lost in Conference Semifinals, 1-4 (Kodiaks) |
| 2010-11 | 46 | 26 | 14 | 6 | 58 | 160 | 139 | 1st, Brittain | Lost in Finals, 0-4 (Sockeyes) |
| 2011-12 | 44 | 28 | 16 | 1 | 58 | 162 | 129 | 2nd, Brittain | Lost in Finals, 2-4 (Ice Hawks); Cyclone Taylor Cup Champions, 3-2 (Cougars); Keystone Cup Champions, 9-1 (Northern Hawks) |
| 2012-13 | 44 | 33 | 10 | 2 | 66 | 199 | 91 | 1st, Brittain | Lost in Conference Finals, 1-4 (Kodiaks) |
| 2013-14 | 44 | 27 | 12 | 5 | 59 | 196 | 144 | 2nd, Brittain | Lost in Conference Finals, 1-4 (Kodiaks) |
| 2014-15 | 44 | 21 | 11 | 2 | 44 | 123 | 144 | 4th, Brittain | Lost in Conference Finals, 3-4 (Kodiaks) |
| 2015-16 | 44 | 29 | 11 | 4 | 62 | 185 | 124 | 2nd, Brittain | Won Div. Semifinals, 4-2 (Kodiaks); Lost Div. Finals, 0-4 (Outlaws) |
| 2016-17 | 44 | 25 | 15 | 4 | 54 | 186 | 136 | 2 of 5, Brittain; 4 of 10 PJHL | Lost Div. Semifinals, 0-1 (Flames) |
| 2017-18 | 44 | 25 | 15 | 4 | 54 | 180 | 135 | 2nd, Brittain | Won Div. Semifinals, 4-0 (Trappers); Lost Div. Finals, 1-4 (Flames) |
| 2018-19 | 43 | 27 | 14 | 2 | 56 | 188 | 124 | 1st of 6, Brittain; 4 of 12 PJHL | Lost Quarterfinals, 2-4 (Trappers) |
| 2019-20 | 44 | 16 | 26 | 2 | 34 | 97 | 143 | 5th of 6, Brittain; 10 of 12 PJHL | Didn't Qualify |
| 2020-21 | 2 | 0 | 1 | 1 | 1 | 6 | 9 | 3rd of 3, Cohort 2; 12 of 13 PJHL | Season Cancelled |
| 2021-22 | 43 | 8 | 34 | 1 | 0 | 108 | 253 | 6th of 7, Brittain; 11 of 13 PJHL | Didn't Qualify |
| 2022-23 | 48 | 7 | 40 | 1 | 15 | 95 | 239 | 7th of 7, Brittain; 13 of 13 PJHL | Didn't Qualify |
| 2023-24 | 48 | 15 | 30 | 3 | 33 | 132 | 207 | 6th of 7, Brittain; 12 of 14 PJHL | Didn't Qualify |
| 2024-25 | 48 | 22 | 23 | 3 | 47 | 194 | 196 | 3rd of 7, Brittain; 9 of 15 PJHL | Lost Div. Semis, 0-4 (Jets) |

== Awards and trophies ==
Keystone Cup

- 2011-12

Cyclone Taylor Cup

- 1999-00, 2011–12

PJHL Championship

- 1999-00, 2001–02, 2004–05, 2006–07

| Preceded by Blackfalds Wranglers | Keystone Cup Champions; 2012 | Succeeded by Richmond Sockeyes |
