= Surrey Knights =

- City: Surrey, British Columbia, Canada
- League: Pacific Junior Hockey League
- Conference: Harold Brittain
- Founded: 1999–00
- Home arena: North Surrey Sport and Ice Complex
- Colours: Grey, Black and Gold
- Owners: John Craighead and Amar Gill
- General manager: Gerry Leiper
- Head coach: Andrew Liboiron
- Website: www.surreyknights.ca

Franchise history
- 1999–2002: Queen's Park Pirates
- 2002–2005: North Delta Flyers
- 2005–2014: North Delta Devils
- 2014–2016: Langley Knights
- 2016–present: Surrey Knights

The Surrey Knights are a Junior ice hockey team based in Surrey, British Columbia. They are members of the Harold Brittain Conference of the Pacific Junior Hockey League (PJHL). The Knights play their home games at the North Surrey Sport and Ice Complex.

== History ==
The team was founded in 1999 in New Westminster as the Queen's Park Pirates, where they played their home games at the historic Queen's Park Arena until they relocating to the Sungod Arena in North Delta for the 2002–03 season, moving to North Delta, dropping the Pirates name and changing it to Flyers, to become the North Delta Flyers. The Flyers played three seasons before changing their name to Devils in 2005. The North Delta Devils relocated to the George Preston Recreation Centre in 2014, moved to Langley, dropped the Devils name and changed it to Knights, becoming the Langley Knights. On June 2, 2016, The PJHL announced the relocation of the Langley Knights to the city of Surrey in time for the 2016–17 season. This relocation happened because the Vancouver Giants relocated from the Pacific Coliseum to the Langley Events Centre, forcing the BCHL's Langley Rivermen out of their old home. They had to go to the George Preston Centre, which also forced the Knights out of Langley and into Surrey, to become the Surrey Knights.

The first few years in Surrey were disastrous, compiling a 4-163-9 record in the first four years, including a winless first season. In the first season post Covid-19, the Knights would equal their total wins since moving, but that still meant losing 39 games and finishing second last. The team has been on a slow trajectory upwards since 2022, and broke out in the 2025-26 season, winning 30 games and finishing 4th

In 2016–17, the Knights' first season in their new location, the Knights did not win a single game all season in the PJHL. The Knights' last win in the PJHL was Thursday, November 19, 2015, 3–2 win vs Abbotsford Pilots. a span of 89 games.

After a two-year winless streak, the Junior B Surrey Knights bagged a 2–0 win Friday, November 24, 2017, against the Abbotsford Pilots. Goalie Zakary Babin stood on his head, stopping 49 Abbotsford shots to get the shutout. The Knights mustered just 12 shots the other way. It would be the only win for Surrey Knights for 2017–18.

For the 2018–2019 season, The Surrey Knights would win its first 2 games. The first win came of the year on Thursday vs. expansion White Rock Whalers with a 6–5 victory on December 6, 2018. Naveen Kainth faced 59 shots, earning first star of the game. The 2nd win of the year, came on Thursday, January 24, 2019, with a 6–2 victory over the Mission City Outlaws. Naveen Kainth would face 50/52 shots and earn 1st, star of the game. It would mark the last win of the season for the Knights.

The 2019–2020, Surrey Knights moved to a new home at the North Surrey Sport & Ice Complex. They would go on to have another unsuccessful Season, winning only one game, on December 19th with a 4-1 victory vs the Grandview Steelers.

In 2025, the league announced plans to promote the Chilliwack Jets, Coastal Tsunami, Delta Ice Hawks, Grandview Steelers, Langley Trappers, Richmond Sockeyes and Ridge Meadows Flames to a new Tier 1 division beginning in the 2025–26 season. Under the plan, the Abbotsford Pilots, Aldergrove Ironmen, Mission City Outlaws, North Vancouver Wolf Pack, Port Coquitlam Trailblazers, Port Moody Panthers, Surrey Knights and White Rock Whalers would remain as Tier 2, as well as a planned expansion team to be based in Cloverdale. However, when the plan was put to the franchise owners for a vote, it failed to pass by the required two-thirds majority, with 8 members voting for and 7 voting against. The vote was divided between the franchises that had been selected for promotion, who voted in favour of the motion, and those not selected for promotion, who voted against it.

The Knights won 30 of 44 regular season games in 2025-26, the franchise's most successful year since they won 36 games in 2010, and the best since they moved to Surrey. They finished 2nd in the Harold Brittain conference, only behind the White Rock Whalers. They beat North Vancouver 4 games to 1 in the first round of the expanded playoffs, but were eliminated by Mission after 2 overtimes in game 7 of the second round.

== Season-by-season record ==
Note: GP = Games played, W = Wins, L = Losses, OT = Overtime Losses, Shootout losses & Ties, Pts = Points, GF = Goals for, GA = Goals against

Season	GP	W	L	OT	Pts	GF	GA	Finish	Playoffs
Queen's Park Pirates
1999-00	42	5	34	3	13	144	241	7th, PIJHL	Did not qualify
2000-01	42	12	27	3	27	142	232	6th, PIJHL	Lost in quarterfinals, 2–3 (Ice Hawks)
2001-02	42	14	27	1	29	164	242	6th, PIJHL	Lost in quarterfinals, 1-3 (Buckaroos)
North Delta Flyers
2003-04	42	23	16	3	49	136	142	4th, PIJHL	Lost in quarterfinals, 1–4 (Buckaroos)
2004-05	48	22	21	5	49	188	188	6th, PIJHL	Lost in quarterfinals, 3–4 (Steelers)
North Delta Devils
2005-06	48	32	13	3	67	187	136	3rd, PIJHL	Lost in semifinals, 0–4 (Pilots)
2006-07	48	23	23	2	48	175	190	6th, PIJHL	Lost in quarterfinals, 1–4 (Flames)
2007-08	48	18	17	3	39	189	240	6th, PIJHL	Lost in quarterfinals, 1–4 (Steelers)
2008-09	48	32	15	1	65	202	140	2nd, Shaw	Won div. semifinal, 4–0 Steelers) (Lost div. finals, 0-4 (Sockeyes)
2009-10	48	36	7	5	77	220	122	1st, Shaw	Lost div. semifinals, 3–4 (Ice Hawks)
2010-11	46	24	17	5	53	164	165	4th, Shaw	Lost div. semifinals, 0–4 (Sockeyes)
2011-12	44	26	14	4	56	150	143	2nd, Shaw	Lost in div. semifinals, 3–4 (Ice Hawks)
2012-13	44	21	18	5	47	133	143	4th, Shaw	Lost in conference semifinals, 0–4 (Sockeyes)
2013-14	44	10	31	3	23	110	214	5th, Shaw	Did not qualify
Langley Knights
2014-15	44	23	19	1	48	130	174	2nd, Harold Brittain	Lost in div. semifinals, 2–4 (Outlaws)
2015-16	44	4	38	2	10	98	281	5th, Harold Brittain	Did not qualify
Surrey Knights
2016-17	44	0	41	3	3	66	293	6 of 6, Harold Brittain	Did not qualify
2017-18	44	1	42	1	3	71	311	6 of 6, Harold Brittain	Did not qualify
2018-19	44	2	41	1	5	78	344	6 of 6, Harold Brittain; 12th of 12 PJHL	Did not qualify
2019-20	44	1	39	4	6	77	265	6 of 6, Harold Brittain; 12th of 12 PJHL	Did not qualify
2020-21	Season Lost to COVID-19 pandemic								
2021-22	44	4	39	1	9	90	254	7 of 7, Harold Brittain; 12th of 13 PJHL	Did not qualify
2022-23	48	12	32	4	28	127	232	5of 7, Harold Brittain; 11th of 13 PJHL	Lost Div. quarterfinals, 0-2 (Jets)
2023-24	48	15	28	5	35	147	207	5of 7, Harold Brittain; 11th of 14 PJHL	Lost Div. quarterfinals, 0-2 (Outlaws)
2024-25	48	17	29	2	36	160	220	5 of 7, Harold Brittain; 12th of 15 PJHL	Won Survivor Series 2-1 (Langley Trappers); Lost Conf Semis, 0-2 (Ridge Meadows Flames)
2025-26	44	30	7	7	67	185	125	2 of 8, Harold Brittain 4th of 16 PJHL	Won Conf. Quarterfinals 4-1 (Wolf Pack)Lost Conf. Semis, 3-4 (Outlaws)

== NHL alumni ==
- Colton Gillies
- Ben Maxwell
- John Negrin
