= Port Coquitlam Trailblazers =

Junior ice hockey club

- City: Port Coquitlam
- League: BCHC
- Division: Mainland
- Founded: 2023
- Home arena: Port Coquitlam Community Centre
- Colours: Purple; Gold
- Owner: Rob Toor
- General manager: Ryan Ross
- Head coach: Greg Ross
- Website: pocohockey.ca

Previous franchise history
- 2023–2026: PJHL

The Port Coquitlam Trailblazers are a junior ice hockey club and franchise of the British Columbia Hockey Conference (BCHC). The team plays its home games at the Port Coquitlam Community Centre (PCCC) in Port Coquitlam.

== Team identity ==
The team said that the name 'Trailblazers' reflects the City of Port Coquitlam's Coast Salish roots, its breathtaking landscape, and its residents, "including the late Terry Fox, who grew up in Port Coquitlam." Its official colours are purple, gold and white, which harken back to the Port Coquitlam Minor Hockey Association that was founded in 1974, and the original branding of the Los Angeles Kings. The team’s logo features the Golden Ears peaks in the background and the Pitt River Bridge in the foreground. It is meant to symbolize "the untamed path we set forth upon and the bridge the Trailblazers hope to build between the organization and the community."

== History ==
=== Pacific Junior Hockey League ===
The team finished its inaugural season in last place overall, thus failing to qualify for the playoffs, with 7 wins and 41 losses in the regular season. While the Aldergrove Kodiaks finished the season with only 6 wins and 42 losses, they ranked slightly higher than the Trailblazers because they received partial points for 3 games that it lost during overtime.

The team was founded at a time of significant flux for junior ice hockey in British Columbia. In 2023, governing body BC Hockey announced plans to restructure its junior hockey framework following the decision of its only Junior A league, the BCHL, to become an independent league. The three Junior B leagues (PJHL, KIJHL and VIJHL) were summarily designated as "Junior A Tier 2", with plans to conduct an independent evaluation of those teams seeking to be promoted to "Junior A Tier 1". It was expected that those teams promoted to Tier 1 would eventually apply for membership in the CJHL. In April 2024, the Vancouver Island Junior Hockey League announced that it would withdraw from the Hockey Canada framework and become an independent farm league for the BCHL in the 2024–25 season.

In the 2024–25 season, Hockey Canada and its four western affiliates – BC Hockey, Hockey Alberta, Hockey Saskatchewan and Hockey Manitoba – will pilot the Western Canadian Development Model (WCDM). Under the WCDM, junior leagues will adopt most of the Western Hockey League rulebook, excluding some sections, and restrictions on 15-year-old affiliate players in the Western Hockey League will be loosened. Players that will be 18-years of age or older in the calendar year will be allowed to choose whether to use full-face protection or half-face protection, whilst younger players will be required to use full-face protection.

In 2025, the league announced plans to promote the Chilliwack Jets, Coastal Tsunami, Delta Ice Hawks, Grandview Steelers, Langley Trappers, Richmond Sockeyes and Ridge Meadows Flames to a new Tier 1 division beginning in the 2025–26 season. Under the plan, the Abbotsford Pilots, Aldergrove Ironmen, Mission City Outlaws, North Vancouver Wolf Pack, Port Coquitlam Trailblazers, Port Moody Panthers, Surrey Knights and White Rock Whalers would remain as Tier 2, as well as a planned expansion team to be based in Cloverdale. However, when the plan was put to the franchise owners for a vote, it failed to pass by the required two-thirds majority, with 8 members voting for and 7 voting against. The vote was divided between the franchises that had been selected for promotion, who voted in favour of the motion, and those not selected for promotion, who voted against it.

Statistics
Season	GP	W	L	T	OTL	GF	GA	Pts	Regular season	Playoffs
2023–24	48	7	41	0	0	113	289	14	7th in division 14th overall	Did not qualify
2024–25	48	27	19	2	0	224	190	26	6th in division 8th overall	Lost first round against Delta (4:2)
2025–26	49	15	31	0	3	158	245	33	7th in division 13th overall	Lost first round against Ridge Meadows (4:1)

Source: "Standings". Pacific Junior Hockey League.

=== British Columbia Hockey Conference ===
In 2026, the Flames became an inaugural member of the British Columbia Hockey Conference (BCHC). The BCHC comprised 22 former PJHL and KIJHL franchises which BC Hockey promoted to the Junior 'A' level.

== See also ==
- BC Hockey
- Cyclone Taylor Cup
- Hockey Canada
- Pacific Junior Hockey League
- City of Port Coquitlam
