= Mission City Outlaws =

- City: Mission, British Columbia
- League: Pacific Junior Hockey League
- Conference: Harold Brittain
- Founded: 2003–04
- Home arena: Mission Leisure Centre
- Colours: Black, Silver, Purple, White
- Owners: Scott Farrell, Parv Dhaliwal
- General manager: Scott Farrell
- Head coach: Martin Hak (2025)
- Website: www.missioncityoutlaws.com

Franchise history
- 2003–2008: Hope Icebreakers
- 2008–2012: Mission Icebreakers
- 2012–present: Mission City Outlaws

The Mission City Outlaws are a Junior ice hockey team based in Mission, British Columbia, Canada. They are members of the Harold Brittain Conference of the Pacific Junior Hockey League (PJHL). The Outlaws play their home games at Mission Leisure Centre. Scott Farrell serves as the General Manager, Governor and Co-Owner of the hockey team. Parv Dhaliwal is also a Co-Owner.

== History ==
The Hope Icebreakers joined the league in 2003 as an expansion team, before relocating prior to the 2008-09 PIJHL season to become the Mission Icebreakers. For the 2012–13 season the team changed their name and logo to the Mission City Outlaws.

In 2014–15 season, the Mission City Outlaws beat out the Aldergrove Kodiaks to win the Harold Brittain Conference. Hosts of the 2014-15 Cyclone Taylor Cup - The Mission City Outlaws beat out the North Vancouver Wolfpack to claim the bronze medal.

In 2025, the league announced plans to promote the Chilliwack Jets, Coastal Tsunami, Delta Ice Hawks, Grandview Steelers, Langley Trappers, Richmond Sockeyes and Ridge Meadows Flames to a new Tier 1 division beginning in the 2025–26 season. Under the plan, the Abbotsford Pilots, Aldergrove Ironmen, Mission City Outlaws, North Vancouver Wolf Pack, Port Coquitlam Trailblazers, Port Moody Panthers, Surrey Knights and White Rock Whalers would remain as Tier 2, as well as a planned expansion team to be based in Cloverdale. However, when the plan was put to the franchise owners for a vote, it failed to pass by the required two-thirds majority, with 8 members voting for and 7 voting against. The vote was divided between the franchises that had been selected for promotion, who voted in favour of the motion, and those not selected for promotion, who voted against it.

== Season-by-season record ==
Note: GP = Games played, W = Wins, L = Losses, T = Ties, OTL = Overtime Losses, Pts = Points, GF = Goals for, GA = Goals against

Season	GP	W	L	T	OTL	Pts	GF	GA	Finish	Playoffs
Hope Icebreakers
2003-04	42	1	39	1	1	4	109	266	8th, PIJHL	Did not qualify
2004-05	48	14	28	3	3	34	152	202	7th, PIJHL	Lost in Quarterfinals, 1-4 (Ice Hawks)
2005-06	48	14	26	4	4	36	157	220	7th, PIJHL	Lost in Quarterfinals (Pilots)
2006-07	48	17	25	2	4	40	187	221	7th, PIJHL	Lost in Quarterfinals, 0-4 (Steelers)
2007-08	48	15	29	-	4	34	140	209	8th, PIJHL	Lost in Quarterfinals, 0-4 (Pilots)
Mission Icebreakers
2008-09	48	9	38	-	1	19	138	273	5th, Harold Brittain	Did not qualify
2009-10	48	14	31	-	3	31	148	244	4th, Harold Brittain	Lost in Div. Semifinals, 2-4 (Flames)
2010-11	46	18	23	-	5	41	137	165	4th, Harold Brittain	Lost in Div. Semifinals, 2-4 (Pilots)
2011-12	44	8	33	-	3	19	126	245	5th, Harold Brittain	Did not qualify
Mission City Outlaws
2012-13	44	9	31	1	3	22	110	221	4th, Harold Brittain	Lost in Div. Semifinals, 0-4 (Pilots)
2013-14	44	11	28	2	3	27	122	178	4th, Harold Brittain	Lost in Div. Semifinals, 0-4 (Kodiaks)
2014-15	44	21	20	1	2	45	173	160	3rd, Harold Brittain	Won Div. Semifinals, 4-2 (Knights); Won Div. Finals, 4-1 (Kodiaks); Lost PJHL Finals, 4-2 (Wolf Pack)
2015-16	44	31	11	0	2	64	203	123	1st, Harold Brittain	Won Div. Semifinals, 4-3 (Flames); Won Div. Finals, 4-0 (Pilots); Won PJHL Finals, 4-1 (Steelers)
2016-17	44	18	22	0	4	40	158	167	4th, Harold Brittain	Lost Div. Semifinals, 1-4 (Kodiaks)
2017-18	44	17	26	0	1	35	121	151	5 of 6, Harold Brittain	Did not qualify
2018-19	43	13	27	0	3	35	121	151	5 of 6, Harold Brittain; 11th of 12 PJHL	Did not qualify
2019-20	44	21	19	3	1	46	157	169	4 of 6, Harold Brittain; 8th of 12 PJHL	Won Div. Semifinals, 4-1 (Trappers); Lost Div. Finals, 1-4 (Kodiaks)
2020-21	Season lost to COVID-19 pandemic									
2021-22	44	20	18	3	3	46	138	155	4 of 7, Harold Brittain; 8th of 13 PJHL	Lost Div. Semifinals, 1-4 (Trappers)
2022-23	48	28	20	0	0	56	180	160	3 of 7, Harold Brittain; 7th of 13 PJHL	Lost Div. Semifinals, 1-4 (Flames)
2023-24	48	24	23	1	0	49	122	141	4 of 7, Harold Brittain; 9th of 14 PJHL	Won Div. Playin 2-0 (Surrey Knights); Lost Div. Semifinals, 0-4 (Flames)
2024-25	48	10	35	3	0	23	132	276	6 of 7, Harold Brittain; 14th of 15 PJHL	Did not qualify

== Cyclone Taylor Cup ==
British Columbia Jr B Provincial Championships

Season	Round Robin	Record	Standing	SemiFinal	Bronze Medal Game	Gold Medal Game
2015 **	L, Kimberley 1-2; OTW, North Vancouver 7-6; L, Campbell River 2-3	1-2-0	3rd of 4	n/a	W, North Vancouver 7-0; Bronze Medalist	n/a
2016	W, Campbell River 7-2; L, 100 Mile House 1-2; L, Victoria 5-7	1-2-0	3rd of 4	n/a	L, Campbell River 4-8	n/a

- 2015 Host for Cup
