= Richmond Sockeyes =

Junior ice hockey team

- City: Richmond
- League: BCHC
- Division: Mainland
- Founded: 1972
- Home arena: Minoru Arena
- Colours: Black, red, silver and white
- General manager: Will Kump
- Head coach: Scott Hewson
- Website: richmondsockeyes.com

Franchise history
- 1972–1979: Richmond Sockeyes (PJAHL)
- 1979–1990: Richmond Sockeyes (BCJHL)
- 1990–2025: Richmond Sockeyes (PJHL)
- 2026-present: Richmond Sockeyes (BCHC)

The Richmond Sockeyes are a junior ice hockey team based in Richmond, British Columbia. The Sockeyes have won nine PJHL championships, six Cyclone Taylor Junior B BC Championship titles, two Keystone Cup National Junior B Championship titles, two Mowat Cup BC Junior A Championship titles (winners of the PAC-A Junior League versus the BCJHL winners), a Fred Page Championship as BCHL champions and a Centennial Cup as National Junior A Champions (both in 1987). They also won the Abbott Cup and Doyle Cup in 1987.

The Richmond Sockeyes currently play in the Mainland Division of the Junior A British Columbia Hockey Conference (BCHC), after leaving the PJHL in 2026. They play their home games at Minoru Arena in central Richmond.

== PAC-A and BCJHL (Junior A) history ==
The Richmond Sockeyes were one of the founding members in the new Pacific Junior A Hockey League in 1973-1974 along with the Nor'Wes Caps, Coquitlam Comets, Surrey Stampeders, Chilliwack Bruins, Kerrisdale Couriers and Vancouver Junior Canucks. As PJHL Champions, the Sockeyes defeated the BCJHL Champions in 1977 and 1979 for the Mowat Cup as British Columbia Junior "A" hockey champions. In 1977 the Sockeyes lost out to the Saskatchewan Junior Hockey League's Prince Albert Raiders for the Abbott Cup as Western Canadian Champions after winning the Doyle Cup as Alberta/BC Champions.

In 1979, the PJHL merged with the BCJHL and along with it came the Richmond Sockeyes. From 1979 until 1990, the Sockeyes finished first place in the league 3 times and won the league in 1987. After winning the league, they defeated the Peace Cariboo Junior Hockey League's Quesnel Millionaires 2-games-to-none to win the Mowat Cup. Then they defeated the Red Deer Rustlers of the Alberta Junior Hockey League for the Doyle Cup 4-games-to-3. They moved on from there to beat the Humboldt Broncos of the SJHL to win the Abbott Cup and to earn a berth in the Centennial Cup.

They started on their National title quest by beating the Dartmouth Fuel Kids of the Metro Valley Junior Hockey League 7–3. They then lost out to host Humboldt Broncos 6–1. They pulled themselves together in the final game of the Round Robin to defeat the Central Junior A Hockey League's Pembroke Lumber Kings 4–1. The next day, Richmond and Pembroke squared off again, resulting in a 9–3 victory for the Sockeyes. This set up a Humboldt-Richmond final, their ninth game against each other in less than a month. The Richmond Sockeyes came out strong and pulled off a 5–2 victory to clinch their only National title.

In 1990, the town of Chilliwack, British Columbia bought the franchise rights to the team and created the Chilliwack Chiefs to make up for the Chilliwack Eagles ownership moving to Ladner, British Columbia. The Sockeyes reformed in the Junior "B" Pacific International Junior Hockey League.

== PIJHL history ==
Richmond defeated the Abbotsford Pilots in the 1990–1991 PIJHL playoffs and then went on to beat the Nelson Leafs in the Cyclone Taylor Cup in two games.

The team won the Bronze in the Keystone Cup in 2003 after missing out on the title game based on goal-ratio.

The next year, 2004, they again won the PIJHL league championship, the Cyclone Taylor Cup provincial championship and this time placed 2nd in the Keystone Cup.

In 2009 the Sockeyes won the PIJHL league championship, they hosted and won the Cyclone Taylor Cup provincial championship, and the Keystone Cup.

In the 2010–11 PIJHL season, the Sockeyes won the PIJHL championship over the Abbotsford Pilots 4-games-to-none.

In the 2011–12 PIJHL season, the Sockeyes won the Regular season championship for the second year in a row. Due to numerous injuries in the playoffs and less than stellar play, the Sockeyes eventually lost the Tom Shaw Conference Finals to their rival the Delta Ice Hawks 4-games-to-2.

The 2012–2013 season was also Richmond's 40th year of operation. With the name changed from the PIJHL in 2012/2013 to the Pacific Junior Hockey League(PJHL), the Richmond Sockeyes hoped for a better season than last year losing in the Tom Shaw Conference finals to the Delta Ice Hawks 4–2. The Sockeyes would have another outstanding regular season finishing first for the third straight year and fourth time in five years with a record of 32–8–4. The playoffs started with a 4–0 sweep of the North Delta Devils, followed by a seven-game series versus the Delta Ice Hawks. Richmond would end up dominating the Aldergrove Kodiaks in four games to claim their 9th PJHL title.

Richmond would then go on to the Cyclone Taylor Cup being hosted by the Comox Valley Glacier Kings and go 3–0 in the round-robin and face the Victoria Cougars from the VIJHL in the championship game. Richmond would end up winning 4–1 and book their ticket to the 2013 Keystone Cup in St. Malo, Manitoba.

After four tough games in four days in Comox, the team had only a couple of days of rest before flying to Winnipeg and boarding a team bus to St. Malo, Manitoba to represent British Columbia at the 2013 Keystone Cup – the Western Canadian Junior B Championships. Facing a long travel and game schedule that included six games in four days, the Sockeyes had numerous victories. They went 5–0 in the round-robin and outscored the provincial championship teams from Alberta, Saskatchewan, Manitoba and Ontario by a total of 39–10. They faced the Saskatoon Royals for a second time in the final on Sunday, April 21. After a fast-paced first period that ended 0–0, the Sockeyes' play led to a 3–0 lead. The Sockeyes beat the Saskatoon team in the final frame in a 5–2 win and led to their second Keystone Cup championship in franchise history. The Sockeyes depth was again a big factor in their success in the difficult schedule as contributions from Jordan Andrews, Derek Hughes, Bret Higham, William Latimer and affiliate player Austin Adamson proved crucial. The Red Line torched the tournament and MVP Rudi Thorsteinson scored an incredible 11 goals in 6 games (after scoring 7 in the regular season). Thorsteinson led the tournament in scoring with 16 points while he, Jake Roder and Jeremy Hamaguchi combined with 39 points. Rookies Danton Heinen and Daniel Lange also notched five goals apiece while veteran Stephen Campbell scored four. Dean Allison, the team's regular season and playoff leading scorer and team MVP in 2012–2013, who is also the grandson of the Richmond Sockeyes original owner, the late Bruce Allison, and team captain Sam Chichak regularly shut down the other teams top forwards. All of the teams at the Keystone Cup had talented players, but the Sockeyes two deadly power play units, stellar penalty killing and their ability to play all four lines and both goaltenders separated them from the other provincial champions. In total, 19 different Sockeyes notched at least a point in the tournament, and every player contributed with key shot blocks, face-off wins and strong, team-first play.

In the tournament, Richmond was able to outscore its opponents 44–12 and outshoot them 264–125. The Sockeyes have also been tied or leading a game for 871 minutes and 25 seconds in 900 minutes of hockey, which means they only trailed for 28 minutes and 35 seconds in 15 hockey games. The only times that the Sockeyes were down since game 6 of the Tom Shaw Final was in the first game of the Cyclone Taylor Cup to Victoria for 2:06, the gold medal game against Victoria for 24:10, and briefly to the Saskatoon Royals for 2:06 and Thunder Bay Northern Hawks for 0:13 in the Keystone Cup.

In 2025, the league announced plans to promote the Chilliwack Jets, Coastal Tsunami, Delta Ice Hawks, Grandview Steelers, Langley Trappers, Richmond Sockeyes and Ridge Meadows Flames to a new Tier 1 division beginning in the 2025–26 season. Under the plan, the Abbotsford Pilots, Aldergrove Ironmen, Mission City Outlaws, North Vancouver Wolf Pack, Port Coquitlam Trailblazers, Port Moody Panthers, Surrey Knights and White Rock Whalers would remain as Tier 2, as well as a planned expansion team to be based in Cloverdale. However, when the plan was put to the franchise owners for a vote, it failed to pass by the required two-thirds majority, with 8 members voting for and 7 voting against. The vote was divided between the franchises that had been selected for promotion, who voted in favour of the motion, and those not selected for promotion, who voted against it.

In 2025-26, the Sockeyes had one of the greatest PJHL seasons in history, losing only 5 games out of 49 and finishing 18 points ahead of the back-to-back defending champions Ridge Meadows. Due to the expanded playoff format, Richmond was drawn to play the lowly 8th place Burnaby in the first round, whom they handled with ease, recording 3 shutouts and only 1 goal against. In the 2nd round their opponent were the Langley Trappers, who had finished 6th, 47 points behind Richmond. After the Sockeyes leapt out to a 2-0 series lead, including a 5-1 first game, the underdog Trappers won both their games at home to even up the series at 2 all. Back in Minoru for game 5, Richmond looked to get back on track, shutting out the visitors 3-0. This defeat did not phase Langley, who hit back with a 4-2 win in game 6 to send it to game 7 in Richmond. Game 7 was close, with Langley holding a 2-1 lead by the end of the 2nd period. Richmond would score again to close the lead to one, but it wasn't enough. In one of the greatest upsets in BC junior hockey history, the Langley Trappers had beaten the Sockeyes 4 games to 3.

== BCHC History ==
The landscape of junior hockey in British Columbia experience a major shakeup in 2025 and 2026. In an effort to replace the now independent BCHL as the top Junior A league, the top teams from the KIJHL and PJHL merged to form the new British Columbia Hockey Conference, which included Richmond. The Sockeyes were placed in the Mainland Division, alongside most of the other former PJHL teams.

== Season-by-season record ==
Note: GP = Games played, W = Wins, L = Losses, T = Ties, OTL = Overtime Losses, Pts = Points, GF = Goals for, GA = Goals against

Season	GP	W	L	T	OTL	Pts	GF	GA	Finish	Playoffs
1974–75	40	21	16	3	–	45	178	158	3rd, PJHL	Lost in Semifinals
1975–76	40	21	18	1	–	43	175	154	3rd, PJHL	Lost in Semifinals
1976–77	47	42	5	0	–	84	308	140	1st, PJHL	PJHL, Mowat Cup, Doyle Cup Champions
1977–78	48	41	5	2	–	84	353	140	1st, PJHL	PJHL Champions
1978–79	48	39	9	0	–	78	377	191	1st, PJHL	PJHL, Mowat Cup, Doyle Cup Champions
1979–80	66	30	35	1	–	61	320	327	4th, Coastal	Lost in Division Finals, 3–4 (Clippers)
1980–81	42	33	9	0	–	66	271	167	2nd, Coastal	Lost in Division Quarterfinals, 4–5 (Flyers)
1981–82	48	23	25	0	–	46	255	282	4th, Coastal	Lost in Division Semifinals, 0–4 (Royals)
1982–83	56	21	33	2	–	44	265	314	5th, Coastal	Did not qualify
1983–84	50	29	20	1	–	59	293	243	3rd, Coastal	Lost in Division Semifinals, 3–4 (Clippers)
1984–85	52	31	19	2	–	64	342	279	2nd, Coastal	Lost in Division Semifinals, 3–4 (Flyers)
1985–86	52	39	13	0	–	76	367	200	1st, Coastal	Lost in Finals, 1–4 (Knights)
1986–87	52	38	14	0	–	76	347	192	1st, Coastal	Fred Page Cup, Mowat Cup, Doyle Cup, Abbott Cup, Centennial Cup Champions
1987–88	52	34	16	2	–	70	325	216	1st, Coastal	Lost in Finals, 1–4 (Lakers)
1988–89	60	33	27	0	–	66	325	289	4th, Coastal	Lost in Division Semifinals, 2–4 (Royals)
1989–90	59	21	35	3	–	45	307	352	5th, Coastal	Lost in Division Round Robin, 1–6
1990–99	PIJHL Standings Not Available									
1999-00	42	24	14	4	–	52	219	174	2nd, PIJHL	Lost in Quarterfinals, 1–4 (Steelers)
2000–01	42	16					151	204	5th, PIJHL	Lost in Semifinals, 0–3 (Buckaroos)
2001–02	42	20	17	3	2	45	184	159	4th, PIJHL	Lost in Semifinals, 2–4 (Pilots)
2002–03	42	18	20	3	1	40	159	174	5th, PIJHL	PIJHL Champions, 4–3 (Pilots); Cyclone Taylor Cup Champions, 2–1 (Storm)
2003–04	42	26	10	5	1	58	184	111	2nd, PIJHL	PIJHL Champions, 4–1 (Ice Hawks); Cyclone Taylor Cup Champions (Storm)
2004–05	48	27	15	5	1	60	189	142	4th, PIJHL	Lost in Quarterfinals, 3–4 (Buckaroos)
2005–06	48	21	18	4	5	51	177	150	5th, PIJHL	Lost in Quarterfinals (Steelers)
2006–07	48	23	14	5	6	57	186	179	4th, PIJHL	Lost in Semifinals, 0–4 (Pilots)
2007–08	48	35	8	–	5	75	220	144	2nd, PIJHL	Lost in Semifinals, 3–4 (Steelers)
2008–09	48	39	8	–	1	79	268	115	1st, Tom Shaw	PIJHL Champions, 4–1 (Pilots); Cyclone Taylor Cup Champions (Leafs); Keystone Cup Champions (Wolverines)
2009–10	48	33	9	–	6	72	186	117	2nd, Tom Shaw	Lost in Conference Finals, 1–4 (Ice Hawks)
2010–11	46	37	5	–	4	78	223	106	1st, Tom Shaw	PIJHL Champions, 4–0 (Pilots)
2011–12	44	37	7	–	0	74	231	69	1st, Tom Shaw	Lost in Conference Finals, 2–4 (Ice Hawks)
2012–13	44	32	8	–	4	68	197	97	1st, Tom Shaw	PJHL Champions, 4–0 (Kodiaks); Cyclone Taylor Cup Champions (Cougars); Keystone Cup Champions (Royals)
2013–14	44	34	5	3	2	73	196	98	1st, Tom Shaw	Lost Finals, 3–4 (Kodiaks)
2014–15	44	32	10	–	2	66	193	106	2nd, Tom Shaw	Lost Div. Semi-finals, 3–4 (Steelers)
2015–16	44	20	16	3	5	48	150	143	3rd, Tom Shaw	Lost Div. Semi-finals, 2–4 (Steelers)
2016–17	43	22	13	3	5	52	139	104	3rd, Tom Shaw	Lost Div. Semi-finals, 3–4 (Steelers)
2017–18	44	33	8	1	2	69	215	125	2nd of 5, Tom Shaw	Won Div. Semi-finals, 4–1 (Wolf Pack); Lost Div. Finals 1–4 (Ice Hawks) to Cyclone Taylor Cup as Host
2018–19	44	30	10	2	1	63	192	98	3rd of 6, Tom Shaw; 3rd of 12 PJHL	Lost Quarterfinals, 1-4 (Steelers)
2019–20	44	27	12	1	4	59	209	136	2nd of 6, Tom Shaw; 2nd of 12 PJHL	Lost Quarterfinals, 3-4 (Steelers)
2020–21	Season lost to COVID-19 pandemic									
2021–22	44	31	12	1	0	63	184	115	2nd of 6, Tom Shaw; 4th of 13 PJHL	Lost Quarterfinals, 3-4 (Ice Hawks)
2022–23	48	31	12	2	3	67	195	140	2nd of 6, Tom Shaw; 3rd of 13 PJHL	Lost Semifinals, 1-4 (Whalers)
2023–24	48	45	1	0	2	92	279	106	1st of 7, Tom Shaw; 1st of 14 PJHL	Won Div. Semifinals, 4-0 (Whalers); Won Div. Finals 4-1 (Ice Hawks); Lost League Finals 3-4 (Flames)
2024–25	48	32	11	3	2	69	244	137	2nd of 8, Tom Shaw; 4th of 15 PJHL	Won Div. Semifinals, 4-2 (Whalers); Lost Div. Finals 1-4 (Ice Hawks)
2025-26	49	44	5	0	0	88	267	106	1st of 8, Tom Shaw 1st of 16 PJHL	Won Div. Quarterfinals 4-0 (Steelers) Lost Div. Semifinals 3-4 (Trappers)

== Cyclone Taylor Cup ==
British Columbia Jr B Provincial Championships

Season	Round Robin	Record	Standing	SemiFinal	Bronze Medal Game	Gold Medal Game
2003	- - -	-	–	-	-	GOLD MEDAL
2004	- - -	-	–	-	-	GOLD MEDAL
2009	- - -	-	–	-	-	GOLD MEDAL
2011	L, Peninsula Panthers 4–6; L, Fernie Ghostriders 0–1; W, Osoyoos Coyotes 4–3	1–2–0	3rd of 4	L, Osoyoos Coyotes 0–3	n/a	did not qualify
2013	W, Victoria Cougars 5–2; W, Comox Valley Glacier Kings 6–2; W, Castlegar Rebels 3–2	3–0–0	1st of 4	W, Comox Valley Glacier Kings 5–4	n/a	W, Victoria Cougars 4–1; GOLD MEDAL
2018; HOST	W, Campbell River Storm 4–1; L, Kimberley Dynamiters 1–6; W, Delta Ice Hawks 5–3	2–1–0	1st of 4	n/a	—	W, Delta Ice Hawks 5–1; GOLD MEDAL

== NHL alumni ==
- Karl Alzner
- Jason Garrison
- Danton Heinen
- Matt Hervey
- Dan Kesa
- Scott King
- Bruce Major
- Kenndal McArdle
- Doug Morrison
- Raymond Sawada
- Claudio Scremin
- Rob Skrlac
- Phil Von Stefenelli
- Dave Tomlinson
- Steve Tuttle

== Awards and trophies ==
Centennial Cup

- 1986–87

Abbott Cup

- 1986–87

Doyle Cup

- 1976–77, 1978–79, 1986–87

Mowat Cup

- 1976–77, 1978–79, 1986–87

Keystone Cup

- 2008–09, 2012–2013

Cyclone Taylor Cup

- 1990–91, 2002–03, 2003–04, 2008–09, 2012–2013, 2017-2018

Fred Page Cup

- 1986–87

PJHL or PAC-A Championships(1972–1979)

- 1976–77, 1977–78, 1978–79

PIJHL Championship(1990–2012)

- 1990–91, 2002–03, 2003–04, 2008–09, 2010–11

PJHL Championship(2012–Present)

- 2012–2013

Most Valuable Player

- Kyle Nishi: 2007–08
- Tyler Andrews: 2017–18

Best Defenceman

- Alex Koch: 2009–10
- Adam Nishi: 2013–14

Best Goaltender

- Brad Anderson: 2007–08
- Sean Donnelly: 2008–09
- Matt Walker: 2009–10
- Aaron Oakley: 2010–11
- Kootenay Alder: 2011–12, 2013–14
- Ray Woodley: 1986
- Frank Romeo: 1987
- John Dougan: 1981

Rookie of the Year

- Carter Popoff: 2011–12
- John Wesley: 2013–14

Most Improved Player

- Brad McGowan: 2008–09
- Sebastien Pare: 2010–11

Most Inspirational Player

- Patrick Hunter:2010–11
- Jeremy Hamaguchi: 2012–13

Coach of the Year

- Judd Lambert: 2008–09, 2010–11, 2011–12

Executive of the Year

- Doug Paterson: 2010–11

Preceded by Penticton Knights	Centennial Cup Champions; 1987	Succeeded by Notre Dame Hounds
Preceded by Sherwood Park Knights	Keystone Cup Champions; 2009	Succeeded by Revelstoke Grizzlies
Preceded by Abbotsford Pilots	Keystone Cup Champions; 2013	Succeeded by Beaver Valley Nitehawks
