= Chilliwack Jets =

Ice hockey team in British Columbia, Canada

- City: Chilliwack, British Columbia, Canada
- League: British Columbia Hockey Conference
- Division: Mainland
- Founded: 2020
- Home arena: Sardis Sports Complex
- Owner: Clayton Robinson
- General manager: Clayton Robinson
- Head coach: Jacob Mangone
- Website: chilliwackjets.com

Franchise history
- 1965–1971: Chilliwack Jets (WCJHL)
- 2020–2026: Chilliwack Jets (PJHL)
- 2026–present: Chilliwack Jets (BCHC)

The Chilliwack Jets are a junior ice hockey team based in Chilliwack, British Columbia, Canada. They are set to compete in the Mainland Division in the British Columbia Hockey Conference (BCHC) beginning in the 2026–27 season after playing in the Pacific Junior Hockey League (PJHL). The Jets play their home games at the Sardis Sports Complex.

== History ==
The original Chilliwack Jets (1965–71) team was one of the original six teams in the Pacific Junior Hockey League (PJHL), which was then called the West Coast Junior Hockey League. The present-day Chilliwack Jets debuted as an expansion team in the 2020–21 PCHL season, however the season was cancelled due to the COVID-19 pandemic.

In 2025, the league announced plans to promote the Chilliwack Jets, Coastal Tsunami, Delta Ice Hawks, Grandview Steelers, Langley Trappers, Richmond Sockeyes and Ridge Meadows Flames to a new Tier 1 division beginning in the 2025–26 season. Under the plan, the Abbotsford Pilots, Aldergrove Ironmen, Mission City Outlaws, North Vancouver Wolf Pack, Port Coquitlam Trailblazers, Port Moody Panthers, Surrey Knights and White Rock Whalers would remain as Tier 2, as well as a planned expansion team to be based in Cloverdale. However, when the plan was put to the franchise owners for a vote, it failed to pass by the required two-thirds majority, with 8 members voting for and 7 voting against. The vote was divided between the franchises that had been selected for promotion, who voted in favour of the motion, and those not selected for promotion, who voted against it.

On April 20, 2026, the Jets were named as one of 22 teams joining the BCHC, leaving the PJHL with the other seven members of the Tom Shaw Conference.

== Season-by-season record ==
Note: GP = Games played, W = Wins, L = Losses, T = Ties, OTL = Overtime Losses, PTS = Points, GF = Goals for, GA = Goals against

Season	GP	W	L	T	OTL	PTS	GF	GA	Finish	Playoffs
2020-21	6	4	1	0	1	3	15	31	2nd of 3, Cohort 2; 11th of 13, PJHL	Cancelled due to the COVID-19 pandemic
2021-22	44	30	13	0	0	61	204	142	3rd of 7, Harold Brittain; 5th of 13, PJHL	Lost div. semi-finals, 0-4 (Ridge Meadows)
2022-23	48	21	21	0	6	48	176	179	4th of 7, Harold Brittain; 9th of 13, PJHL	Won div. qual. round, 2-0 (Surrey); Won div. semi-finals, 4-1 (Langley); Lost div. finals, 0-4 (Ridge Meadows)
2023-24	48	28	16	0	4	60	184	130	2nd of 7, Harold Brittain; 5th of 14, PJHL	Won div. semi-finals, 4-3 (Langley); Lost div. finals, 0-4 (Ridge Meadows)
2024-25	48	39	9	0	0	78	243	123	2nd of 7, Harold Brittain; 2nd of 15, PJHL	Won Conf Semi-finals, 4-0 (Abbotsford Pilots); Lost Conf Finals, 0-4 (Ridge Meadows)
