= Coastal Tsunami =

Junior ice hockey team

- City: Gibsons
- League: PJHL (2024–2026); BCHC (2026–present)
- Division: Mainland division
- Founded: 2024
- Home arena: Gibsons & Area Community Centre
- Colours: Deep sea blue, ice blue, boundless blue, shadow blue, red alert
- Owner: Julie Reeves
- General manager: Briar McNaney
- Website: coastalhockey.ca

The Coastal Tsunami are a junior ice hockey team based in Gibsons, British Columbia on the Sunshine Coast. They are set to play in the Mainland Division of the British Columbia Hockey Conference (BCHC) starting in the 2026–27 season. The Tsunami debuted as an expansion team in the Pacific Junior Hockey League (PJHL) in the 2024–25 PJHL season.

== Arena ==
The team plays its home games in the Gibsons & Area Community Centre. The building opened in 2008 and is owned by the Sunshine Coast Regional District. The Sunshine Coast Junior Hockey Society (SCJHS) funded improvements to the building, including seating upgrades and construction of new dressing rooms, that were expected to be completed before the 2024–25 PJHL season. The SCJHS also secured the donation of a four-panel video display score clock that it hoped could be installed and operational in time for the inaugural season. The display was donated by the Pacific National Exhibition and used to hang above centre-ice at the Pacific Coliseum in Vancouver. The Sunshine Coast Regional District has not confirmed whether the score clock will be installed in the arena.

== Team identity ==
The team name was chosen by the owners from among the approximately 250 submissions from the public. The name Tsunami was submitted four times. Other submissions included references to The Beachcombers television series that was shot in Gibsons from 1972–1990 and remains an important cultural relic for the community, and The Blues, after the name used by Sunshine Coast Minor Hockey. The team's colours are based on those used by the Seattle Kraken. The official logo was designed by local designer John Ridd of Topshelf Creative. A secondary logo design featured a trident with a "C" curved around it as a reference to Poseidon, God of the sea, storms, earthquakes, and horses in Greek mythology.

== History ==
The team was founded at a time of significant flux for Junior ice hockey in British Columbia. In 2023, governing body BC Hockey announced plans to restructure its junior hockey framework following the decision of its only Junior A league, the BCHL, to become an independent league. The three Junior B leagues (PJHL, KIJHL and VIJHL) were summarily designated as "Junior A Tier 2", with plans to conduct an independent evaluation of those teams seeking to be promoted to "Junior A Tier 1". It was expected that those teams promoted to Tier 1 would eventually apply for membership in the CJHL. In April 2024, the Vancouver Island Junior Hockey League announced that it would withdraw from the Hockey Canada framework and become an independent farm league for the BCHL in the 2024–25 season. The league expected the evaluations to be completed during the 2024–25 season.

In the 2024–25 season, Hockey Canada and its four western affiliates – BC Hockey, Hockey Alberta, Hockey Saskatchewan and Hockey Manitoba – will pilot the Western Canadian Development Model (WCDM). Under the WCDM, junior leagues will adopt most of the Western Hockey League rulebook, excluding some sections, and restrictions on 15-year-old affiliate players in the Western Hockey League will be loosened. Players that will be 18-years of age or older in the calendar year will be allowed to choose whether to use full-face protection or half-face protection, whilst younger players will be required to use full-face protection.

In 2025, the league announced plans to promote the Chilliwack Jets, Coastal Tsunami, Delta Ice Hawks, Grandview Steelers, Langley Trappers, Richmond Sockeyes and Ridge Meadows Flames to a new Tier 1 division beginning in the 2025–26 season. Under the plan, the Abbotsford Pilots, Aldergrove Ironmen, Mission City Outlaws, North Vancouver Wolf Pack, Port Coquitlam Trailblazers, Port Moody Panthers, Surrey Knights and White Rock Whalers would remain as Tier 2, as well as a planned expansion team to be based in Cloverdale. However, when the plan was put to the franchise owners for a vote, it failed to pass by the required two-thirds majority, with 8 members voting for and 7 voting against. The vote was divided between the franchises that had been selected for promotion, who voted in favour of the motion, and those not selected for promotion, who voted against it.

In 2026, the Coast Tsunami, and 21 other clubs from the PJHL and KIJHL, formed the British Columbia Hockey Conference (BCHC) Junior A Hockey League under the auspices of governing body BC Hockey.

Season-by-season record
Season	GP	W	L	OTL	SOL	GF	GA	Pts	Finish	Playoffs
2024–25	48	19	27	1	1	140	188	40	7th in division 11th overall	Did not qualify
2025–26	49	19	25	5	0	162	210	43	5th in division 11th overall	Lost first round against Delta (4:1)

Source: "Standings". pjhl.net. Pacific Junior Hockey League.

== See also ==
- BC Hockey
- Hockey Canada
- Pacific Junior Hockey League
- Town of Gibsons

== Additional reading ==
- Jordison, Connie (23 May 2024). "Tsunami sweeps up a local as its first committed player". Coast Reporter. Glacier Media Group.
- "Coastal Tsunami prospects camp to hit the ice". Coast Reporter. Glacier Media Group. 1 May 2024.
- Jordison, Connie (15 May 2023). "SCRD 'on-side' with junior hockey society asks". Coast Reporter. Glacier Media Group.
- "It's time to name the Sunshine Coast's new junior hockey team". Coast Reporter. Glacier Media Group. 6 October 2023.
- Beairsto, Bronwyn (29 August 2024). "Tsunami hires PJHL's first full-time female coach, exhibition games scheduled". The Peak. Glacier Media Group.
- Richards, Eric (3 September 2024). "Coastal Tsunami hire first female coach in the PJHL". My Coast Now.
- Beairsto, Bronwyn (19 September 2024). "Coastal Tsunami crush hometown opener". Coast Reporter. Glacier Media Group.
