= Delta Ice Hawks =

Junior ice hockey team

- City: Delta, British Columbia
- League: BCHC
- Division: Mainland
- Founded: 1997
- Home arena: Sungod Recreation Centre
- Colours
- Owner: Eduard Epshtein
- General manager: Mark Burgin
- Head coach: Rick Lanz
- Website: deltaicehawks.com

Championships
- League: 2001; 2006; 2012; 2018; 2023
- Provincial: 2006

The Delta Ice Hawks are a Junior ice hockey team based in Delta, British Columbia, Canada. They are members of the Mainland Division of the British Columbia Hockey Conference (BCHC). The Ice Hawks play their home games at Sungod Recreation Centre.

== History ==
The Ice Hawks joined the league in 1997 as an expansion team. In its PJHL history, the team has won the Cyclone Taylor Cup once, in 2006. The 2006 Championship Ice Hawks team suffered no regulation losses in the PJHL playoffs. The Ice Hawks have won the PJHL Championship in 2001, 2006, 2012, 2018 and 2023.

In 2025, the league announced plans to promote the Chilliwack Jets, Coastal Tsunami, Delta Ice Hawks, Grandview Steelers, Langley Trappers, Richmond Sockeyes and Ridge Meadows Flames to a new Tier 1 division beginning in the 2025–26 season. Under the plan, the Abbotsford Pilots, Aldergrove Ironmen, Mission City Outlaws, North Vancouver Wolf Pack, Port Coquitlam Trailblazers, Port Moody Panthers, Surrey Knights and White Rock Whalers would remain as Tier 2, as well as a planned expansion team to be based in Cloverdale. However, when the plan was put to the franchise owners for a vote, it failed to pass by the required two-thirds majority, with 8 members voting for and 7 voting against. The vote was divided between the franchises that had been selected for promotion, who voted in favour of the motion, and those not selected for promotion, who voted against it.

The team announced on June 5th, 2025 that they would be moving their operations from the Ladner Leisure Centre to the Sungod Recreation Centre beginning in the 2025–26 season. An increased capacity, better facilities, and an ability to schedule Saturday night games were reasons cited for the move.

== Season-by-season record ==
Note: GP = Games played, W = Wins, L = Losses, T = Ties, OTL = Overtime Losses, Pts = Points, GF = Goals for, GA = Goals against

Season	GP	W	L	T	OTL	Pts	GF	GA	Finish	Playoffs
1999–00	42	20	20	2	—	42	188	192	4th, PIJHL	Lost in Quarterfinals, 0–4 (Buckaroos)
2000–01	42	27	—	—	—	—	185	128	3rd, PIJHL	PIJHL Champions, 4–1 (Buckaroos)
2001–02	42	22	16	3	1	48	202	164	2nd, PIJHL	Lost in Finals, 0–4 (Pilots)
2002–03	42	25	14	1	2	53	176	127	3rd, PIJHL	Lost in Semifinals, 1–4 (Sockeyes)
2003–04	42	28	10	2	2	60	185	144	1st, PIJHL	Lost in Finals, 1–4 (Sockeyes)
2004–05	48	28	13	4	3	66	188	136	2nd, PIJHL	Lost in Finals, 3–4 (Pilots)
2005–06	48	34	9	2	3	73	224	143	1st, PIJHL	Won Quarterfinals, 4–0 (Buckaroos); Won Semi-Finals, 4–0–1 (Steelers); Won Finals, 4–0–2 (Pilots); PIJHL Champions; Cyclone Taylor Cup Champions (Pilots); Keystone Cup Bronze Medalists
2006–07	48	23	18	6	1	53	194	172	5th, PIJHL	Lost in QuarterFinals, 1–4 (Sockeyes)
2007–08	48	15	27	—	6	36	190	252	7th, PIJHL	Lost in QuarterFinals, 0–4 (Sockeyes)
2008–09	48	24	18	—	6	54	206	197	4th, Shaw	Lost in Div. Semifinals, 0–4 (Sockeyes)
2009–10	48	21	25	—	2	44	166	201	4th, Shaw	Won Div. SemiFinals, 4–3 (Devils); Won Div. Finals, 4–1 (Sockeyes); Lost in League Finals, 2–4 (Kodiaks)
2010–11	46	34	9	—	3	71	202	132	2nd, Shaw	Won Div. SemiFinals, 4–1 (Steelers); Lost in Div. Finals, 3–4 (Sockeyes)
2011–12	44	29	11	1	3	62	219	132	2nd, Shaw	Won Div. SemiFinals, 4–3 (Devils); Won in Div. Finals, 4–2 (Sockeyes); Won in League Finals, 4–2 (Pilots); PIJHL Champions
2012–13	44	31	9	2	2	66	187	96	2nd, Shaw	Won Div. SemiFinals, 4–0 (Wolf Pack); Lost in Conference Finals, 3–4 (Sockeyes)
2013–14	44	23	16	1	4	51	144	136	3rd, Shaw	Lost in Div. Semifinals, 2–4 (Wolf Pack)
2014–15	44	22	20	—	2	46	156	171	4th, Shaw	Lost Div. SemiFinals, 0–4 (Wolf Pack)
2015–16	44	20	18	2	4	46	158	175	4th, Shaw	Won Div. SemiFinals, 4–2 (Wolf Pack); Lost Div. Finals, 2–4 (Steelers)
2016–17	44	31	12	0	1	63	173	121	1st, Shaw	Won Div. SemiFinals, 4–1 (Wolf Pack); Won Div. Finals, 4–1 (Steelers); Lost League Finals, 2–4 (Kodiaks)
2017–18	44	37	4	0	3	77	237	79	1st, PJHL	Won Div. Semifinals, 4–0 (Steelers); Won Div. Finals, 4–1 (Sockeyes); Won League Finals, 4–2 (Flames); PJHL Champions - adv to Cyclone Taylor Cup
2018–19	44	32	7	2	3	77	202	101	2nd of 6 Shaw Conf; 2nd of 12, PJHL	Won Quarterfinals, 4–3 (Kodiaks); Lost Semifinals, 1–4 (Trappers)
2019–20	44	19	19	3	3	44	144	118	5th of 6 Shaw Conf; 9th of 12, PJHL	Did not qualify
2020–21	Season cancelled									
2021–22	44	27	13	1	3	58	214	167	3rd of 6 Shaw Conf; 6th of 13, PJHL	Won Div. Semifinals, 4–3 (Sockeyes); Lost Div. Finals, 2–4 (Whalers); Advance Cyclone Taylor – HOSTS
2022–23	48	35	13	0	0	70	256	110	1st of 6 Shaw Conf; 2nd of 13, PJHL	Won Div. Semifinals, 4–1 (Steelers); Won Div. Finals, 4–1 (Whalers); Won League Finals, 4–3 (Flames); Advance Cyclone Taylor
2023–24	48	34	11	1	2	71	249	138	2 of 7 Shaw Conf; 3rd of 14, PJHL	Won Div. Semifinals, 4–0 (Wolf Pack); Lost Div. Finals, 1–4 (Sockeyes)
2024–25	48	34	10	1	3	72	267	172	1st in division 3rd overall	Won quarterfinal against Port Coquitlam (4:2); Won semifinal against Richmond (4:1); Lost final against Ridge Meadows (4:2)
2025–26	49	23	19	0	4	53	206	189	4th in division 8th overall	Won first round against Coastal (4:1); Lost quarterfinal against Ridge Meadows (4:1)

Source: "Standings". Pacific Junior Hockey League.

== Provincial championships ==
Season	Round Robin	Record	Standing	SemiFinal	Bronze Medal Game	Gold Medal Game
2006	T, Abbotsford 3–3; T, Sicamous 2–2; W, Kerry Park 7–0	1–0–2	2nd of 4	N/A	N/A	W, Abbotsford 4–1; Gold Medal
2012	T, Beaver Valley 1–1; L, Abbotsford 4–6; W, Victoria 7–2	1–1–1	3rd of 4	N/A	W, Beaver Valley 5–3; Bronze Medal	—
2018	W, Kimberley Dynamiters, 3–0; OTW, Campbell River Storm, 3–2; L, Richmond Sockeyes, 3–5	2–1–0	2nd of 4	N/A	—	L, Richmond Sockeyes, 1–5; Silver Medal
2022	W, Revelstoke Grizzlies, 2–0; W, Peninsula Panthers, 8–7; W, Langley Trappers, 5–2	3–0–0	1st of 4	N/A	—	L, Langley Trappers, 2–4; Silver Medal
2023	OTL, Kimberley Dynamiters, 1–2; W, Oceanside Generals, 7–4; L, Revelstoke Grizzlies, 2–5	1–1–1	3rd of 4	—	L, Oceanside Generals, 2–4	—

== Regional championship ==
Season	Round Robin	Record	Standing	SemiFinal	Bronze Medal Game	Gold Medal Game
2006	L, Campbell River 2–4; W, Saskatoon Royals 3–1; L, Red Deer 0–4; W, North Winnipeg 14–3; W, Thunder Bay 8–3	3–2–0	3rd of 6	N/A	W, Saskatoon Royals 4–3; Bronze Medal	—

== NHL alumni ==
- Troy Brouwer
- Milan Lucic
- Brent Seabrook
- Brandon Segal

== Awards and trophies ==
Cyclone Taylor Cup

- 2005–06

PJHL Championship

- 2000–01, 2005–06, 2011–12, 2017–18

PJHL Coach Of The Year

- 2016–17 — Darren Naylor

PJHL Executive Of The Year

- 2017–18 — Eduard Epshtein

PJHL Trainer Of The Year

- 2017–18 — Wayne Hubbard
