= Pacific Junior Hockey League =

Junior ice hockey league

- Current season or competition: 2026–27
- Co-commissioners: Kevin Nanne; Dave Newson
- Former names: WCJHL; PIJHL
- Founded: 1965
- No. of teams: 8
- Feeder to: BCHC
- Website: www.pjhl.net

The Pacific Junior Hockey League (PJHL) is a junior ice hockey league in British Columbia.

== History ==
=== Early years: 1966–1980 ===
The earliest incarnation of the Pacific Junior Hockey League, the West Coast Junior Hockey League, was founded in 1966, with a total of six teams, including the still-existent Grandview Steelers. Other teams from Chilliwack, Coquitlam, Richmond and Burnaby. These five teams, along with the Nor Wes Caps, contested the first season of play in the new league. The Richmond Juniors were awarded the first ever championship in 1967, but the early years of the league were dominated by the Nor Wes Caps, who won four championships in the first seven seasons in the league. However, in the mid-70s, a number of league teams departed for the Junior 'A' level of hockey, including the Nor Wes Caps. A number of teams would replace the departed, including the North Shore Flames and the Northwest Americans. In the second half of the 1970s, the league championship was continuously handed back and forth between the Richmond Rebels, Burnaby Blazers and the Northwest Americans, before the Blazers and Rebels were forced to relocate.

=== 1980–2000 ===
The first seven seasons of the 1980s were dominated by the North Shore Flames and the Northwest Americans, who combined won all seven league championships in that time (four for the Americans, and three for the Flames). This dominance was ended in 1987 by the Burnaby Bluehawks, who defeated the White Rock Whalers in the league final. White Rock would become champions the following year, defeating the North Shore Flames en route to the title. In 1989, current league members Abbotsford Pilots won their first league title, having relocated from Mission shortly before. A number of previously title-less teams would win the championship in the following years, including the Coquitlam Warriors in 1991, the Richmond Sockeyes in 1992, and the Port Coquitlam Buckeroos in 1995. In 1992, the West Coast Junior Hockey League officially re-branded itself as the Pacific International Junior Hockey League. In 1994, the Grandview Steelers won their first championship since 1968, defeating the Richmond Sockeyes in the league championship. The Port Coquitlam Buckeroos and Ridge Meadows Flames would split the next four championship between them, until the Abbotsford Pilots won in 1998–99, and again in 1999-00 for their second and third championships.

=== 2000–2023 ===
The Delta Ice Hawks won their first title in 2000–01, defeating the Buckeroos in five games in the league finals, but lost the finals in four to the Abbotsford Pilots the following season. The next two seasons were won by the Richmond Sockeyes, who defeated Abbotsford and Delta 4–3 and 4–1 respectively for the titles. Abbotsford would defeat Delta in 2004–05 championship final in seven games. However, Delta would defeat those same Pilots the next year in six games. Abbotsford would come back and win the following year, over the Grandview Steelers in the final, which to date remains their last championship. The Pilots would go on to lose in the championship series in four of the next five seasons, to Grandview once, Delta once and Richmond twice. The only year in which the Pilots did not make the final, the Aldergrove Kodiaks won their first title, over the Delta Ice Hawks. In 2012–13, the Richmond Sockeyes won their second title in three years, beating Aldergrove in four games, but the Kodiaks would defeat the Sockeyes the following year to claim their second overall title, in seven games. In 2014–15, the North Vancouver Wolf Pack, formerly the Squamish Wolf Pack, won their first league title, defeating the Mission City Outlaws in the championship. But Mission would win their first league title the following year over the Grandview Steelers in five games. The Aldergrove Kodiaks won their third overall title in 2017, defeating the Ice Hawks in six games. Delta won their fourth title the following year over the Ridge Meadows Flames in six games, but lost to the Richmond Sockeyes in the Cyclone Taylor Cup Final. The Wolf Pack won their second overall title, defeating the Langley Trappers in four games in 2019. The PJHL Championship was not awarded for the first time after the 2019–20 season due to the coronavirus pandemic. And again after the 2020–21 season. The Langley Trappers win their first league title over the White Rock Whalers in five games and captured their first Cyclone Taylor Cup title with a 4–2 victory over the Delta Ice Hawks in 2022. The Ice Hawks would captured their fifth league title the following year over the Ridge Meadows Flames in seven games.

In 2022, the PJHL and KIJHL entered a partnership known as the British Columbia Hockey Conference (BCHC). This involved the creation of a shared Department of Player Safety to oversee enhanced supplementary disciplinary procedures, and an annual showcase event for the leagues' top players known as the Prospects Game. The first Prospects Game took place at the Sardis Sports Complex in Chilliwack.

=== 2023–present ===
In 2023, governing body BC Hockey announced plans to restructure its junior hockey framework following the departure of its only Junior A league. The three Junior B leagues (PJHL, KIJHL and VIJHL) were summarily designated as "Junior A Tier 2", with plans to conduct an independent evaluation of those teams seeking to be promoted to "Junior A Tier 1". It was expected that those teams promoted to Tier 1 would eventually apply for membership in the CJHL. The league expected the evaluations to be completed during the 2024–25 PJHL season.

The Port Coquitlam Trailblazers joined the league as an expansion team in the 2023–24 PJHL season along with the Coastal Tsunami the following season. The Cloverdale Junior Hockey Club joined as an expansion team in the 2025–26 PJHL season.

A new playoff format was introduced for the 2025–26 season. All 16 teams, no matter their regular season record, would qualify. The Aldergrove Ironmen, despite winning just 1 solitary game all season, qualified for the postseason and played the White Rock Whalers, who finished 1st in the Harold Brittain. Unsurprisingly, White Rock had no trouble dispatching the lowly Ironmen in 4 games, scoring 37 goals to Aldergrove's 3.

The two conferences competed as de-facto separate leagues, not playing against each other during the regular season, and that continued into the playoffs. A new trophy, the Pacific Cup, was created for the Harold Brittain champion, the White Rock Whalers, who had defeated the Mission City Outlaws 4 games to 1. The Stonehouse Cup, originally awarded to the PJHL champion, was awarded to the Ridge Meadows Flames, who swept the Langley Trappers in 4 games to win their 3rd title in a row.

In late April 2026, the KIJHL and PJHL announced that the remaining KIJHL and Tier 1 PJHL teams would officially merge to form the British Columbia Hockey Conference, a new sanctioned Junior A league to replace the breakaway BCHL. This leaves only the 8 Harold Brittain Conference teams as members of the PJHL for the 2026–27 season.

== Teams ==
The league announced plans to subdivide into two tiers beginning in the 2025–26 season. Tier one would include the Burnaby Steelers, Chilliwack Jets, Coastal Tsunami, Delta Ice Hawks, Langley Trappers, Richmond Sockeyes and Ridge Meadows Flames. Tier two would include the Abbotsford Pilots, Aldergrove Ironmen, Mission City Outlaws, North Vancouver Wolf Pack, Port Coquitlam Trailblazers, Port Moody Panthers, Surrey Knights, White Rock Whalers and a new expansion team to be based in Cloverdale. However, when a vote was held at the 2025 annual general meeting to approve the changes, it failed to pass by the required two-thirds majority, with 8 members voting for and 7 voting against. The members that voted against the restructuring were those that would have been designated as tier two.

Despite the two tier proposal being voted down, the 2025–26 season would see the two divisions divided along the proposed tier lines, with the Tom Shaw being de-facto Tier 1 and the Harold Brittain Tier 2. Ridge Meadows, Langley and Chilliwack would move to the Tom Shaw conference, and White Rock, North Vancouver and Port Moody would change to the Harold Brittain to even out both conferences at 8.

The Cloverdale expansion franchise was voted down also. An official statement from the league said that the Cloverdale franchise had "not been able to satisfy necessary league bylaws in order to operate as a member club in good standing". A lawsuit was filed on behalf of the seven would-be tier two franchises alleging that the league acted in "an oppressive and unfairly prejudicial manner" in relation to the cancellation of the Cloverdale expansion. On 18 September 2025, news media reported that the Cloverdale team had been reinstated.

Membership
Team	Home	Arena
Abbotsford Pilots	Abbotsford	MSA Arena
Aldergrove Ironmen	Aldergrove	Aldergrove Community Centre
Cloverdale Junior Hockey Club	Cloverdale	Cloverdale Arena
Mission City Outlaws	Mission	Mission Leisure Centre
North Vancouver Wolf Pack	North Vancouver	Harry Jerome Community Recreation Centre
Port Moody Panthers	Port Moody	Port Moody Recreation Complex
Surrey Knights	Surrey	North Surrey Sport & Ice Complex
White Rock Whalers	White Rock	Centennial Arena

== League champions ==
Year	Winner	Runner-up	Games
1967	Richmond Juniors		
1968	Grandview Steelers		
1969	Nor Wes Caps		
1970	Chilliwack Jets		
1971	Nor Wes Caps		
1972	Nor Wes Caps		
1973	Nor Wes Caps		
1974	Point Grey Blades		
1975	Burnaby Blazers		
1976	Northwest Americans		
1977	Richmond Rebels		
1978	Richmond Rebels		
1979	Burnaby Blazers		
1980	Northwest Americans		
1981	Northwest Americans		
1982	Northwest Americans		
1983	North Shore Flames		
1984	North Shore Flames		
1985	North Shore Flames		
1986	Northwest Americans	Ladner Rebels	
1987	Burnaby Bluehawks	White Rock Whalers	
1988	White Rock Whalers	North Shore Flames	3–2
1989	Abbotsford Pilots		
1990	Burnaby Bluehawks		
1991	Coquitlam Warriors		
1992	Richmond Sockeyes	Abbotsford Pilots	3–1
1993	Coquitlam Warriors	Richmond Sockeyes	3–0
1994	Grandview Steelers	Richmond Sockeyes	3–0
1995	Port Coquitlam Buckeroos		
1996	Ridge Meadows Flames	Richmond Sockeyes	4–1
1997	Port Coquitlam Buckeroos	Richmond Sockeyes	4–2
1998	Ridge Meadows Flames	Delta Ice Hawks	3–1
1999	Abbotsford Pilots	Delta Ice Hawks	
2000	Abbotsford Pilots	Grandview Steelers	4–0
2001	Delta Ice Hawks	Port Coquitlam Buckeroos	4–1
2002	Abbotsford Pilots	Delta Ice Hawks	4–0
2003	Richmond Sockeyes	Abbotsford Pilots	4–3
2004	Richmond Sockeyes	Delta Ice Hawks	4–1
2005	Abbotsford Pilots	Delta Ice Hawks	4–3
2006	Delta Ice Hawks	Abbotsford Pilots	4–2
2007	Abbotsford Pilots	Grandview Steelers	4–2
2008	Grandview Steelers	Abbotsford Pilots	4–1
2009	Richmond Sockeyes	Abbotsford Pilots	4–1
2010	Aldergrove Kodiaks	Delta Ice Hawks	4–2
2011	Richmond Sockeyes	Abbotsford Pilots	4–0
2012	Delta Ice Hawks	Abbotsford Pilots	4–2
2013	Richmond Sockeyes	Aldergrove Kodiaks	4–0
2014	Aldergrove Kodiaks	Richmond Sockeyes	4–3
2015	North Vancouver Wolf Pack	Mission City Outlaws	4–2
2016	Mission City Outlaws	Grandview Steelers	4–1
2017	Aldergrove Kodiaks	Delta Ice Hawks	4–2
2018	Delta Ice Hawks	Ridge Meadows Flames	4–2
2019	North Vancouver Wolf Pack	Langley Trappers	4–0
2020	Not awarded		
2021	Not awarded		
2022	Langley Trappers	White Rock Whalers	4–1
2023	Delta Ice Hawks	Ridge Meadows Flames	4–3
2024	Ridge Meadows Flames	Richmond Sockeyes	4–3
2025	Ridge Meadows Flames	Delta Ice Hawks	4–2
2026 (Harold Brittain)	White Rock Whalers	Mission City Outlaws	4–1
2026 (Tom Shaw)	Ridge Meadows Flames	Langley Trappers	4–0

== Notable alumni ==
- Karl Alzner
- Victor Bartley
- Troy Brouwer
- Steve Clippingdale
- John Craighead
- Brenden Dillon
- Kaleigh Fratkin
- Colton Gillies
- Ryan Hollweg
- Bracken Kearns
- Andrew Ladd
- Ben Maxwell
- Brandon Yip
- Stephen Peat
- Brad Hunt
- Tony Horacek
- Milan Lucic
- Sasha Lakovic
- Kenndal McArdle
- Kyle Turris
- Tyler Eckford
- Link Gaetz
- Colin Fraser
- Zach Hamill
- Jeff Tambellini
- David Van der Gulik
- David Jones
- David Wilkie
- Jason Garrison
- Matt Hervey
- Dean Malkoc
- John Negrin
- Mike Santorelli
- Raymond Sawada
- Brent Seabrook
- Brandon Segal
- Jordan Sigalet
- Rob Skrlac
- Trevor Smith
- Nick Tarnasky
- Devon Toews
- Derek Grant
- Scott Langkow
