= Burnaby Steelers =

Junior ice hockey club

- City: Burnaby
- League: BCHC
- Division: Mainland
- Founded: 1965
- Home arena: Burnaby Winter Club
- Colours
- Owners: Aldo Bruno; Mike Moscone
- General manager: Craig Carter
- Head coach: Kyle Johnson
- Website: burnabysteelers.ca

Franchise history
- 1965–2025: Grandview Steelers
- Since 2025: Burnaby Steelers

Previous franchise history
- 1967–1992: WCJHL
- 1992–2026: PIJHL/PJHL

Championships
- League: 1994; 2008
- Provincial: 1994; 2008

The Burnaby Steelers Junior A Hockey Club is a junior ice hockey franchise of the British Columbia Hockey Conference (BCHC). The team plays its home games at the Burnaby Winter Club in Burnaby, British Columbia.

== History ==
Grandview Steelers logo

The Grandview Junior Hockey Association formed in 1967 as an original member of the West Coast Junior Hockey League (WCJHL). In its PJHL history, the team has won the Cyclone Taylor Cup twice, in 1994 and 2008. The Steelers have won the PJHL Championship twice, in 1994 and 2008.

The original name of the team was Rowan's Grandview Steelers, named after Ed Rowan, owner of Rowan Steel Ltd., who provided financial assistance to the community sponsored team. From day one, until the 2003–2004 season, the Steelers’ home games were played on the small ice at "Trout Lake Arena" attached to the Grandview Community Centre. The original colours adopted were black and orange. The current colours black and gold were adopted in the 1980–1981 season. They were the colours of that era's Grandview Minor Hockey Association. Over many years, the largest percentage of Steelers players came from the Grandview Minor Hockey Association.

Over time, the club found if difficult to remain a contender due to its mandate which was to take players primarily from Grandview while other clubs searched far and wide even to the extent of reaching out of province. There was also the difficulty of increasing operational costs within an era of Jr. B clubs trying to operate more on a Jr. A level while the rink the Steelers were mandated to play in did not accommodate enough fans to help pay the bills.

Louis and Yvonne Szendrei took over the running of the club when in 1980–1981; Louis became President/Governor of the Grandview Steelers. Prior to that, Louis was President of the Grandview Minor Hockey Association. Since that time, Louis has noted the foregoing difficulties but despite them, has enjoyed numerous successes that include going all the way. The Steelers were the 1994 Cyclone Taylor Cup provincial champions. The Steelers, under coach Aldo Bruno, were the 1999–00 Provincial Finalists having achieved 2nd place and Aldo was named Coach of the Year that season.

Louis Szendrei moved the team to Britannia Community Centre. The larger ice and increased fan accommodation improved the spirits of the fans and players. Over time, players would be more eager to come and try out for the Steelers.

Steelers logo (2006–2024)

Starting the 2007–08 season the Steelers changed hands from Louis and Yvonne Szendrei to Mike and Sandy Moscone and Aldo Bruno. Louis and Yvonne have stayed on as Governor and Alternating Governor, respectively. After many years of hockey in Vancouver East at the Trout Lake and Britannia Arenas, the 2007–08 season brought new owners, and also brought a permanent change of venue to the Burnaby Winter Club.

The 2007–08 season has the Steelers participate, but become victorious at the end with the winning of the League Championship (PIJHL) over the ever-persistent Abbotsford Pilots. The Steelers arrived in Kimberley and walked away with the Provincial Championship (Cyclone Taylor Cup). The next stop would be Selkirk, Manitoba for the Western Canadian Finals or Keystone Cup. The Steelers came home with the Bronze.

In 2025 the team rebranded from Grandview Steelers to Burnaby Steelers.

In 2025, the league announced plans to promote the Chilliwack Jets, Coastal Tsunami, Delta Ice Hawks, Grandview Steelers, Langley Trappers, Richmond Sockeyes and Ridge Meadows Flames to a new Tier 1 division beginning in the 2025–26 season. Under the plan, the Abbotsford Pilots, Aldergrove Ironmen, Mission City Outlaws, North Vancouver Wolf Pack, Port Coquitlam Trailblazers, Port Moody Panthers, Surrey Knights and White Rock Whalers would remain as Tier 2, as well as a planned expansion team to be based in Cloverdale. However, when the plan was put to the franchise owners for a vote, it failed to pass by the required two-thirds majority, with 8 members voting for and 7 voting against. The vote was divided between the franchises that had been selected for promotion, who voted in favour of the motion, and those not selected for promotion, who voted against it.

Statistics
| Season | GP | W | L | T | OTL | Pts | GF | GA | Regular season | Post-season |
|---|---|---|---|---|---|---|---|---|---|---|
| 1999–00 | 42 | 19 | 19 | 4 | – | 42 | 187 | 182 | 5th overall | Won quarterfinal against Richmond (4:1); Won semifinal against Port Coquitlam (3:1); Lost final against Abbotsford (4:0) |
| 2000–01 | 42 | 10 | 29 | 2 | 1 | 23 | 137 | 215 | 7th overall | Lost quarterfinal against Ridge Meadows (3:1) |
| 2001–02 | 42 | 11 | 30 | 1 | 0 | 23 | 139 | 248 | 7th overall | Did not qualify |
| 2002–03 | 42 | 12 | 29 | 1 | 0 | 25 | 138 | 238 | 7th overall | Did not qualify |
| 2003–04 | 42 | 13 | 23 | 3 | 3 | 32 | 124 | 186 | 7th overall | Did not qualify |
| 2004–05 | 48 | 28 | 14 | 4 | 2 | 62 | 204 | 154 | 3rd overall | Won quarterfinal against North Delta (4:3); Lost semifinal against Delta |
| 2005–06 | 48 | 28 | 12 | 6 | 2 | 64 | 161 | 136 | 4th overall | Won quarterfinal against Richmond (4:1); Lost semifinal against Delta (4:1) |
| 2006–07 | 48 | 28 | 14 | 6 | 0 | 62 | 186 | 144 | 2nd overall | Won quarterfinal against Hope (4:0); Won semifinal against Ridge Meadows (4:3); Lost final against Abbotsford (4:2) |
| 2007–08 | 48 | 26 | 19 | – | 3 | 55 | 192 | 167 | 3rd overall | Won quarterfinal against North Delta (4:1); Won semifinal against Richmond (4:3); Won final against Abbotsford (4:1) |
| 2008–09 | 48 | 30 | 15 | – | 3 | 63 | 220 | 156 | 3rd in division 4th overall | Lost quarterfinal against North Delta (4:0) |
| 2009–10 | 48 | 32 | 12 | – | 4 | 68 | 169 | 133 | 3rd in division 3rd overall | Lost quarterfinal against Richmond (4:0) |
| 2010–11 | 46 | 27 | 14 | – | 5 | 59 | 166 | 134 | 3rd in division 3rd overall | Lost quarterfinal against Delta (4:1) |
| 2011–12 | 44 | 18 | 19 | 3 | 4 | 43 | 146 | 155 | 5th in division 7th overall | Did not qualify |
| 2012–13 | 44 | 17 | 24 | 1 | 2 | 37 | 144 | 170 | 5th in division 8th overall | Did not qualify |
| 2013–14 | 44 | 18 | 20 | 2 | 4 | 42 | 135 | 165 | 4th in division 6th overall | Lost quarterfinal against Richmond (4:0) |
| 2014–15 | 44 | 22 | 17 | 1 | 4 | 49 | 134 | 135 | 3rd in division 4th overall | Won quarterfinal against Richmond (4:3); Lost semifinal against North Vancouver (4:1) |
| 2015–16 | 44 | 23 | 16 | 2 | 3 | 51 | 147 | 141 | 2nd in division 5th overall | Won quarterfinal against Richmond (4:2); Won semifinal against Delta (4:2); Lost final against Mission (4:1) |
| 2016–17 | 44 | 28 | 9 | 2 | 5 | 63 | 157 | 101 | 2nd in division 3rd overall | Won quarterfinal against Richmond (4:3); Lost semifinal against Delta (4:1) |
| 2017–18 | 44 | 25 | 16 | 1 | 2 | 53 | 147 | 119 | 4th in division 6th overall | Lost quarterfinal against Delta (4:0) |
| 2018–19 | 44 | 23 | 19 | 2 | 0 | 48 | 141 | 116 | 4th in division 6th overall | Won quarterfinal against Richmond (4:1); Lost semifinal against North Vancouver (4:1) |
| 2019–20 | 44 | 25 | 15 | 2 | 2 | 54 | 169 | 121 | 3rd in division 5th overall | Won quarterfinal against Richmond (4:3); Lost semifinal against North Vancouver (4:0) |
| 2020–21 | Season cancelled | | | | | | | | | |
| 2021–22 | 43 | 18 | 20 | 3 | 2 | 41 | 142 | 141 | 5th in division 10th overall | Did not qualify |
| 2022–23 | 48 | 28 | 17 | 1 | 2 | 59 | 203 | 193 | 4th in division 6th overall | Won first round against North Vancouver (2:1); Lost quarterfinal against Delta (4:1) |
| 2023–24 | 48 | 24 | 22 | 0 | 2 | 50 | 171 | 184 | 5th in division 8th overall | Lost first round against White Rock (2:1) |
| 2024–25 | 48 | 27 | 19 | 0 | 2 | 56 | 180 | 152 | 6th in division 8th overall | Did not qualify |
| 2025–26 | 49 | 13 | 33 | 3 | 0 | 29 | 141 | 236 | 8th in division 14th overall | Lost first round against Richmond (4:0) |

Source: "Burnaby Steelers". eliteprospects.com.

=== British Columbia Hockey Conference ===
In 2026, the Steelers became an inaugural member of the British Columbia Hockey Conference (BCHC). The BCHC comprised 22 former PJHL and KIJHL franchises which BC Hockey promoted to the Junior 'A' level.

== Provincial chammpionships ==
| Season | Round Robin | Record | Standing | Semifinal | Bronze Medal Game | Gold Medal Game |
| 2008 | ?, Dynamiters ?-? ?, Fernie?-? ?, Victoria ?-? | ?-?-? | ? of 4 | n/a | n/a | W, Dynamiters 4–3; GOLD MEDAL |

== Regional championships ==
| Season | Round Robin | Record | Standing | Semifinal | Bronze Medal Game | Gold Medal Game |
| 2008 | L, Sherwood Park 4–6; W, Selkirk 4–2; W, Thunder Bay 8–1; T, Pilot Butte Storm 3–3; L, Norway House 1–2 | 2–2–1 | 4th of 6 | n/a | W, Selkirk 5–2; Bronze Medal | n/a |

== NHL alumni ==
- Andrew Hammond
- Ryan Hollweg
