= Langley Trappers =

Junior ice hockey team

- City: Langley, British Columbia
- League: Pacific Junior Hockey League
- Conference: Harold Brittain
- Founded: 2017–18
- Home arena: George Preston Recreation Centre
- Colours: Navy Blue, Silver, White
- General manager: Brad Bakken
- Head coach: Brad Bakken
- Website: langleytrappers.com

Franchise history
- 2017–present: Langley Trappers

The Langley Trappers are a Junior ice hockey team based in Langley, British Columbia. They are members of the Harold Brittain Conference of the Pacific Junior Hockey League (PJHL). The Trappers play their home games at the George Preston Recreation Centre, which is also the home of the Langley Rivermen of the British Columbia Junior Hockey League (BCHL).

== History ==
The Trappers joined the league in 2017 as an expansion team, and made the playoffs in their first year under coach Burt Henderson.

While the Trappers got swept by the Abbotsford Pilots in the first round that year, the lessons learned established the groundwork for success the next year, as Coach Henderson led a core of players to the PJHL Finals in the 2018–19 season. Key performances from goaltender Kristian Lyon, defender Braden Warburton, and forwards Casey Whintors, Keeton Oakley, and Carter Graham led Langley to playoff success, as they beat Abbotsford in 6 games, and beat Delta in 5, before being swept by North Vancouver in the PJHL Finals that year.

Looking to build on their success, the Trappers got to work in the 2019–2020 season, winning the conference in the regular season, but unfortunately were upset in the first round by Mission City in 6 games. The remainder of the playoffs were later shut down due to the COVID-19 pandemic, leaving no champion crowned.

For the 2020–21 season, the Trappers competed in the cohort format against Delta and North Vancouver and held their own until November 2020 when, out of an abundance of caution regarding the COVID Delta variant, the BC government shut down team sports.

Once team sports were re-activated in BC in 2021–22, the Trappers went through organizational changes from both a personnel and coaching standpoint, as a number of core players had either been promoted to Junior A hockey or aged out of Junior Hockey completely, and Coach Burt Henderson and Assistant Coach Thomas Koshman were promoted to head the Langley Rivermen Junior A BCHL team.

That left the Trappers without a Coach, until GM Brad Bakken stepped in and took the reins of a young rebuilding Hockey club. With help from Assistant Coaches Dylan MacKinlay, Garry Mahesh, and Scott Sparkman, as well as Goalie Coach Joey Ali, Bakken guided the Trappers to their most successful year ever, as the team won both the regular season championship and ultimately the PJHL Championship, defeating Mission City in 5 games, Ridge Meadows in a 4-game sweep, and finally the White Rock Whalers in 5 games to clinch the Stonehouse Cup. While it was a complete team effort, key playoff performances from goaltender Taje Gill, defensemen Ryan Tong and Kyle Graham, and forwards Garrett Whintors, Brendan O'Grady, Jamie Hylands, and Lleyton Shearon were prevalent throughout, with forward Anthony Boznijak scoring the Cup-clinching wraparound goal at 19:25 of the 3rd period of Game 5 in front of a sellout crowd at the Lodge at George Preston Arena on Wednesday, March 30, 2022.

The Trappers went on to represent the PJHL as its reigning champion in the Cyclone Taylor Cup in Delta from April 7–10, 2022 at the Ladner Leisure Centre, with fellow PJHL team Delta Ice Hawks serving as tournament host, and with KIJHL Champion Revelstoke Grizzlies and VIJHL Champion Peninsula Panthers completing the final 4 teams competing for Junior B Hockey supremacy. Langley beat Peninsula 6–2 to open the tournament on Thursday, then came back from a 1–0 deficit in the 3rd to beat Revelstoke 3–1 on Friday, before facing the host Ice Hawks in a game to determine home ice advantage on Championship Sunday, as both teams had already clinched spots in the gold medal game with matching undefeated records at that time. Delta won the Saturday game 5–2, however in the end Langley gained revenge for that loss and were crowned champions the next day in the gold medal game on Championship Sunday, as they defeated the Ice Hawks 4–2 to capture their first Cyclone Taylor Cup. Weys and Hylands scored the game winning and insurance goals respectively in the 3rd period.

In 2025, the league announced plans to promote the Chilliwack Jets, Coastal Tsunami, Delta Ice Hawks, Grandview Steelers, Langley Trappers, Richmond Sockeyes and Ridge Meadows Flames to a new Tier 1 division beginning in the 2025–26 season. Under the plan, the Abbotsford Pilots, Aldergrove Ironmen, Mission City Outlaws, North Vancouver Wolf Pack, Port Coquitlam Trailblazers, Port Moody Panthers, Surrey Knights and White Rock Whalers would remain as Tier 2, as well as a planned expansion team to be based in Cloverdale. However, when the plan was put to the franchise owners for a vote, it failed to pass by the required two-thirds majority, with 8 members voting for and 7 voting against. The vote was divided between the franchises that had been selected for promotion, who voted in favour of the motion, and those not selected for promotion, who voted against it.

== Season-by-season record ==
Note: GP = Games played, W = Wins, L = Losses, T = Ties, OTL = Overtime Losses, Pts = Points, GF = Goals for, GA = Goals against

Season	GP	W	L	T	OTL	Pts	GF	GA	Finish	Playoffs
2017-18	44	18	22	2	2	40	124	166	3rd of 6 H Brittain; 7th of 11 League	Lost in Div Semifinal, 0-4 (Pilots)
2018-19	44	25	17	0	2	52	171	143	2nd of 6 H Brittain; 5th of 12 League	Won Div Semifinal, 4-2 (Pilots); Won Conference Final, 4-1 (Ice Hawks); Lost In PJHL Championship Final, 0-4 (Wolf Pack)
2019-20	44	27	14	1	2	57	161	132	1st of 6 H Brittain; 3rd of 12 League	Lost Div Semifinal, 1-4 (Outlaws)
2020-21	6	3	2	0	1	7	25	25	Season lost to COVID-19 Pandemic	
2021-22	44	33	9	0	2	68	185	115	1st of 7 H Brittain; 1st of 13 League	Won Div Semifinal, 4-1 (Mission City); Won Div Finals 4-0 (Ridge Meadows); Won League Finals 4-1 (White Rock); Stonehouse Cup Champions; Cyclone Taylor Cup Champions
2022-23	48	36	8	0	4	76	222	114	1st of 7 H Brittain; 1st of 13 League	Lost in Div Semifinal, 1-4 (Jets)
2023-24	48	25	17	3	3	56	141	122	3rd of 7 H Brittain; 7 of 14 League	Lost in Div Semifinal, 3-4 (Jets)
2024-25	48	22	24	0	2	46	142	168	4th of 7 H Brittain; 10 of 15 League	Lost Survivor Series, 1-2 (Knights)

== Cyclone Taylor Cup ==
British Columbia Jr. B Provincial Championships

Season	Round Robin	Record	Standing	SemiFinal	Bronze Medal Game	Gold Medal Game
2022	W, Peninsula Panthers, 6–2; W, Revelstoke Grizzlies, 3–1; L, Delta Ice Hawks, 5–2	2–1–0	2nd of 4	N/A	—	W, Delta Ice Hawks, 4–2; Gold Medal & Cyclone Taylor Cup Champions
