= Ridge Meadows Flames =

Junior ice hockey team

- City: Maple Ridge
- League: BCHC
- Conference: Mainland
- Founded: 1972
- Home arena: Cam Neely Arena
- Colours: Red; Gold
- Owners: Andrew Ilaender; Adam Heath; Scott Oliver
- General manager: Derek Bedard
- Head coach: Mike Legg
- Website: ridgemeadowsflames.com

Franchise history
- 1972–1993: North Shore Winter Club Flames
- Since 1993: Ridge Meadows Flames

Previous franchise history
- 1972–1973: North Island League
- 1973–1992: WCJHL
- 1992–2026: PIJHL/PJHL

Championships
- League: 1996; 1998; 2004; 2005; 2024; 2025; 2026
- Provincial: 1983; 1996; 1998
- Regional: 1998

The Ridge Meadows Flames are a junior ice hockey club and franchise of the British Columbia Hockey Conference (BCHC). The team plays its home games at the Cam Nealy Arena in Maple Ridge, British Columbia.

== History ==
=== North Shore Winter Club ===
The Ridge Meadows Flames were originally named the North Shore Winter Club Flames in 1972 and joined the North Island League (NIL) for the 1973–74 season, where they won their first ever championship. The following season, the Flames joined the West Coast Junior Hockey League (WCJHL). In the 1981–82 WCJHL season, the Flames lost in the WCJHL Finals, 3 games to 0 to the Seattle North West Americans. In the 1982–83 WCJHL season, the Flames won the 1982–83 WCJHL championship, and the 1982–83 Cyclone Taylor Cup.

North Shore Flames statistics
Season	GP	W	L	T	GF	GA	Pts	Rank
1976–77	42	10	29	3	180	278	23	4
1978–79	32	20	11	1	216	176	41	3

Source: "Ridge Meadows Flames". eliteprospects.com.

=== Ridge Meadows ===
In 1993 the Flames relocated from North Shore, British Columbia to Maple Ridge, British Columbia. In the 1995–96 season, the Flames defeated the Richmond Sockeyes, who they finished second to in the regular season, to take the PIJHL Championship. Two years later, the Flames won the 1998 PIJHL Championship, then went on to win the Keystone Cup in Winnipeg, Manitoba.

In 2025, the league announced plans to promote the Chilliwack Jets, Coastal Tsunami, Delta Ice Hawks, Grandview Steelers, Langley Trappers, Richmond Sockeyes and Ridge Meadows Flames to a new Tier 1 division beginning in the 2025–26 season. Under the plan, the Abbotsford Pilots, Aldergrove Ironmen, Mission City Outlaws, North Vancouver Wolf Pack, Port Coquitlam Trailblazers, Port Moody Panthers, Surrey Knights and White Rock Whalers would remain as Tier 2, as well as a planned expansion team to be based in Cloverdale. However, when the plan was put to the franchise owners for a vote, it failed to pass by the required two-thirds majority, with 8 members voting for and 7 voting against. The vote was divided between the franchises that had been selected for promotion, who voted in favour of the motion, and those not selected for promotion, who voted against it.

Statistics
Season	GP	W	L	T	OTL	Pts	GF	GA	Regular season	Post-season
1995–96	40	26	9	5	0	57	231	161	2nd place	Won final against Richmond (4:1)
1996–97	40	19	19	2	0	40	188	192	4th place	-
1997–98	42	35	7	0	0	70	266	128	1st place	Won final against Delta (3:1)
1998–99	42	25	16	1	0	51	171	162	2nd place	-
1999–00	42	18	22	2	0	38	194	210	6th overall	Lost quarterfinal against Abbotsford (4:1)
2000–01	42	28	12	1	1	58	228	131	2nd overall	Won quarterfinal against Burnaby (3:1); Lost semifinal against Delta (3:1)
2001–02	42	19	19	3	1	42	161	171	5th overall	Lost quarterfinal against Richmond (3:1)
2002–03	42	25	12	3	2	55	187	157	2nd overall	Lost quarterfinal against Richmond (4:3)
2003–04	42	18	18	6	0	42	178	167	6th overall	Lost quarterfinal against Richmond
2004–05	48	11	30	4	3	29	132	205	9th overall	Did not qualify
2005–06	48	21	23	1	3	46	155	154	6th overall	Lost quarterfinal against North Delta (4:1)
2006–07	48	26	15	5	2	59	188	179	3rd overall	Won quarterfinal against North Delta (4:1); Lost semifinal against Burnaby (4:3)
2007–08	48	23	18	–	7	53	192	182	4th overall	Won quarterfinal against Port Moody (4:1); Lost semifinal against Abbotsford (4:0)
2008–09	48	18	28	–	2	38	151	198	4th in division 8th overall	Lost quarterfinal against Abbotsford (4:2)
2009–10	48	28	16	–	4	60	165	145	1st in division 4th overall	Won quarterfinal against Mission (4:2); Lost semifinal against Aldergrove (4:0)
2010–11	46	21	23	–	2	44	171	188	3rd in division 7th overall	Lost quarterfinal against Port Moody (4:3)
2011–12	44	11	32	–	1	23	132	204	4th in division 9th overall	Lost quarterfinal against Aldergrove (4:2)
2012–13	44	16	21	2	5	39	138	197	3rd in division 7th overall	Lost quarterfinal against Aldergrove (4:1)
2013–14	44	17	22	2	3	39	135	155	3rd in division 7th overall	Lost quarterfinal against Abbotsford (4:1)
2014–15	44	16	25	–	3	35	130	174	5th in division 9th overall	Did not qualify
2015–16	44	19	20	2	3	43	174	187	4th in division 8th overall	Lost quarterfinal against Mission (4:3)
2016–17	44	22	18	2	2	48	142	123	3rd in division 6th overall	Won quarterfinal against Abbotsford (4:1); Lost semifinal against Aldergrove (4:0)
2017–18	44	26	14	2	2	56	176	127	1st in division 4th overall	Won quarterfinal against Aldergrove (4:1); Won semifinal against Abbotsford (4:1); Lost final against Delta (4:2)
2018–19	44	20	20	1	3	44	168	151	4th in division 8th overall	Lost quarterfinal against North Vancouver (4:1)
2019–20	44	22	19	0	3	47	178	162	3rd in division 7th overall	Lost quarterfinal against Aldergrove (4:0)
2020–21	Season cancelled									
2021–22	44	32	10	1	1	66	219	109	2nd in division 3rd overall	Won quarterfinal against Chilliwack (4:0); Lost semifinal against Langley (4:0)
2022–23	48	31	14	2	1	65	211	148	2nd in division 4th overall	Won quarterfinal against Mission (4:1); Won semifinal against Chilliwack (4:0); Lost final against Delta (4:3)
2023–24	48	41	4	0	3	85	226	82	1st in division 2nd overall	Won quarterfinal against Mission (4:0); Won semifinal against Chilliwack (4:0); Won final against Richmond (4:3)
2024–25	48	42	4	1	1	86	318	92	1st in division 1st overall	Won quarterfinal against Surrey (4:1); Won semifinal against Chilliwack (4:0); Won final against Delta (4:2)
2025–26	49	35	14	0	0	70	222	151	2nd in division 3rd overall	Won quarterfinal against Port Coquitlam (4:1); Won semifinal against Delta (4:1); Won final against Langley (4:0)

Source: "Ridge Meadows Flames". eliteprospects.com.

=== British Columbia Hockey Conference ===
In 2026, the Flames became an inaugural member of the British Columbia Hockey Conference (BCHC). The BCHC comprised 22 former PJHL and KIJHL franchises which BC Hockey promoted to the Junior 'A' level.

== Provincial championships ==
Season	Round Robin	Record	Standing	SemiFinal	Bronze Medal Game	Gold Medal Game
2024	Won, Kimberley Dynamiters 7–0; Lost, Revelstoke Grizzlies 1–2; Won, Saanich Predators 5–2	2–1–0	2nd of 4	n/a	OT Lost – 2–3; Revelstoke Grizzlies; Silver Medalist	

== NHL alumni ==
- Brad Hunt
- Brandon Yip

== Awards and trophies ==
Keystone Cup

- 1997–98

Cyclone Taylor Cup

- 1982–83, 1995–96, 1997–98

NIL Championship

- 1973–74

PIJHL Championship

- 1995–96, 1997–98, 2023–26

WCJHL Championship

- 1982–83

Coach of the Year

- Tavis Eaton: 2009–10
- Bayne Ryshak: 2017–18

Most Improved Player

- Shane Harle: 2009–10
- Ryley Lanthier: 2017–18

== Sources ==
- "Flames history". Ridge Meadows Flames.
- "BCHC launches as sanctioned Junior A league". Kootenay International Junior Hockey League. 29 April 2026.
- "BCHC releases 2026–27 regular season schedule, divisional alignment & playoff format". British Columbia Hockey Conference. 24 July 2026.
- Bartel, Mario (28 August 2026). "Local teams face shifting junior hockey landscape". Freshet News.
