= Krystal Garib =

Canadian performer

Krystal Kiran Garib
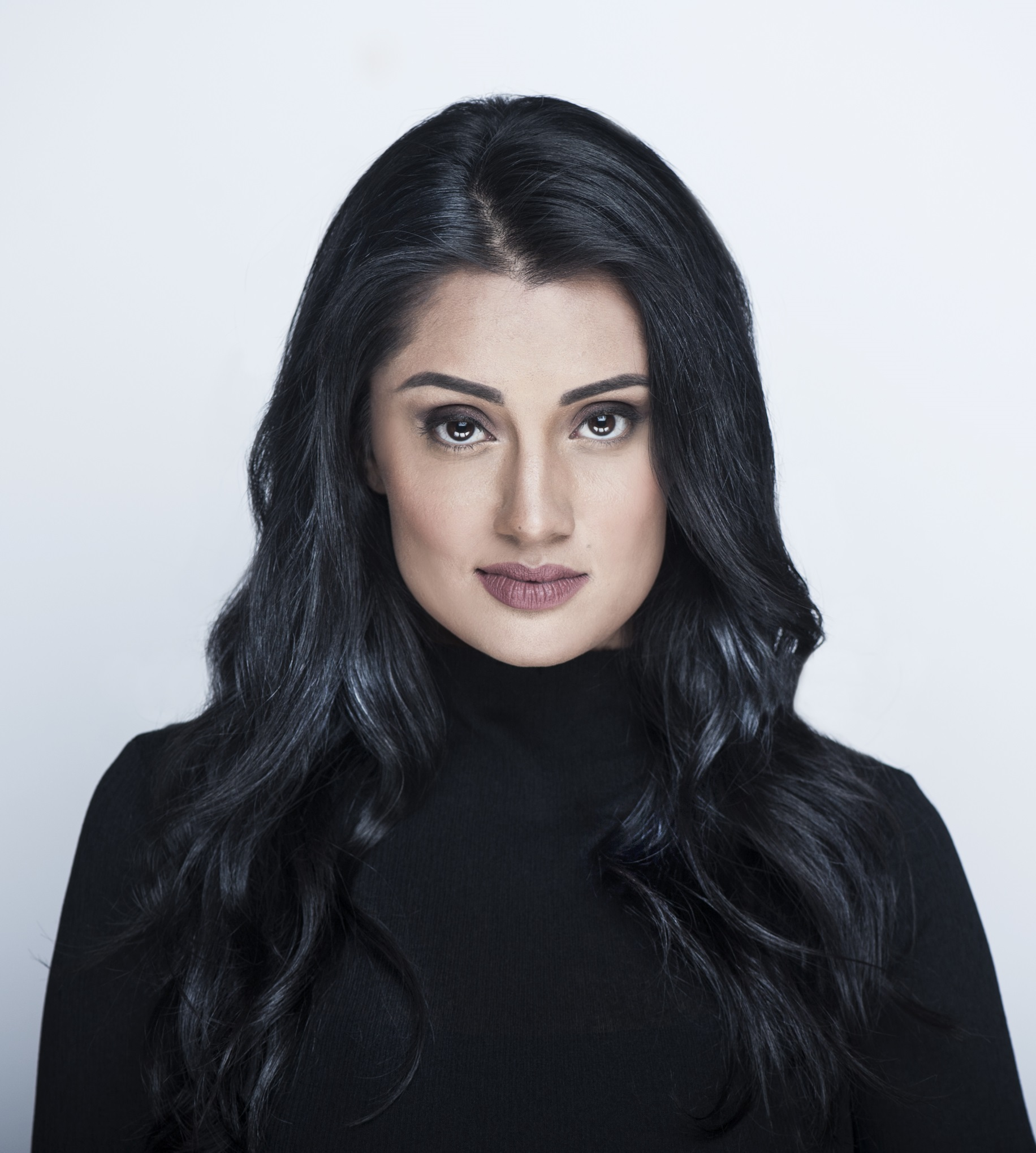
- Born: Penticton, British Columbia, Canada
- Occupations: Broadway performer, singer, dancer, filmmaker, producer, philanthropist, educator.
- Years active: 2001–present

Krystal Kiran Garib is a Canadian Broadway performer, singer, dancer, filmmaker, producer, choreographer and philanthropist. In 2010 she became the first and sole North American singer and performer to tour the world with Oscar and Grammy Award-winning Bollywood film composer A. R. Rahman of Slumdog Millionaire. Garib has modeled for Femina magazine and has appeared on the cover of Dance Spirit Magazine.

== Early life and education ==
Garib was born and raised in the small Canadian town of Penticton, British Columbia, while also spending time living in Kolkata, West Bengal, where her father's family is from. As a youngster, she attended Parkway Elementary, Calcutta International School, Penticton Community Christian School, Wiltse Elementary, The Glenfir School and Penticton Secondary School. Garib is of Sikh and Punjabi heritage and is fluent in English and Punjabi. Growing up in Canada, she started studying dance at the age of three in forms of ballet, jazz, tap, hip hop, modern, contemporary, musical theatre and Kathak when in Kolkata. As a teenager, she took part in community theatre productions such as West Side Story and Joseph and the Amazing Technicolor Dreamcoat. Struggling with a severe stutter growing up, Garib began taking vocal lessons at the age of fourteen as an alternative to speech therapy when traditional methods didn't work. She studied western classical voice and Bel canto technique when in Canada while switching to Hindustani classical music when on frequent visits to India. In 2001, Garib enrolled in the Miss Penticton Royalty program with the intention of exploring another possible avenue to overcome stuttering and a fear of public speaking. Garib went on to win the pageant, along with the award for 'Best Speech', and was crowned the 54th Queen Val Vedette. She graduated from Penticton Secondary School in 2002. In 2009 she was inducted in the School District 67 Wall of Fame, which recognizes outstanding alumni of School District 67 Okanagan Skaha. Shortly after graduating high school, Garib was cast in the Broadway production of Andrew Lloyd Webber and A. R. Rahman's musical Bombay Dreams.

== Broadway breakthrough and other stage performances ==
Garib began her performing career in the summer of 2001 at the age of sixteen as a dancer at Vancouver's Pacific National Exhibition (PNE). In 2004, she became an original ensemble cast member and was one of the understudies for the leading role of Priya in the Broadway production of Andrew Lloyd Webber and A. R. Rahman's musical Bombay Dreams which was directed by Steven Pimlott and choreographed by Anthony Van Laast and Bollywood choreographer Farah Khan with assistant Geeta Kapoor. With the Bombay Dreams production, Garib performed on television shows Good Morning America, Live with Regis and Kelly and Canada AM. In 2005 and as a member of the Bombay Dreams cast, Garib was selected to headline performances for 'Macy's Passport' in Los Angeles and San Francisco hosted by Sharon Stone and Jennifer Lopez and MAC Cosmetics Fashion Cares Bollywood Cowboy along with Jann Arden, Pamela Anderson, Feist and Punjabi Hit Squad. The following year, she appeared in the world premiere stage production of the Lord of the Rings (musical) produced by Kevin Wallace and Mirvish Productions with music again by A. R. Rahman, Värttinä and Christopher Nightingale, book and lyrics by Matthew Warchus and Shaun McKenna and choreography by Peter Darling. Garib understudied all female ensemble roles, including that of Aragorn's love interest, Arwen. As a dancer, Garib has appeared in the following films: Hairspray, The Love Guru, and Repo! The Genetic Opera.

== A.R. Rahman ==
In 2010, Garib was invited to perform with Academy Award-winning Hindi cinema composer, A.R. Rahman on his A. R. Rahman Jai Ho Concert: The Journey Home World Tour. On her consistent work with Rahman, Garib has said "I've wanted to work with Rahman since I was eight years old, when I first heard his music in the film Bombay. His music was and always has been a connection to my homeland, which I think is why he's been a constant source of inspiration throughout my life and career".

== House of Kiran and philanthropy ==
In 2009, Garib founded the House of Kiran, a non-profit performing arts production company producing fundraising events for the likes of DesiFEST Toronto and Toronto's Speech and Stuttering Institute. Garib's production of "Speaking of Shakespeare..." was headlined by the Stratford Shakespeare Festival, Tony Award winning actor Brent Carver and Grammy Award winning musician Jonathan Arons. The event helped raise over $40,000 for the children and adults suffering from speech disorders.

In 2011, along with the family of slain 19-year-old Simon Fraser University student, Maple Batalia, House of Kiran set up a performing arts bursary campaign in honor of the aspiring artist, performer and model. In addition, the family of Batalia set up a scholarship at her the university at which she was studying, raising more than $50,000 for students wishing to study Health Sciences.

== Filmmaking ==
In 2012, House of Kiran created its first short filmed titled Thy Beauty's Doom - In Memory of Maple Batalia which was funded by Canada's bravoFACT. The film was written and directed by Garib and features her as a performer, with music by Christine Wu. The film is based on the paintings of slain Simon Fraser University student, actor and model Maple Batalia and is created in her tribute. iTunes sales of "Forever Gone" the music featured in the film, will support the Maple Batalia Bursary for the Arts which supports young South Asian-Canadian women wanting to pursue the arts, but lack family or community support. The film premiered at the Punjabi International Film Festival / International Film Festival of South Asia Toronto 2014 on 17 May 2014.

The music for the film features a vocal sample of singing and poetry performed by Batalia's mother, Sarbjit and flute by Naveen Kumar (Flautist), who was heavily featured on the Bombay (soundtrack), the music of which a major influence in Garib's early childhood and with whom she toured with on the A. R. Rahman Jai Ho Concert: The Journey Home World Tour.

== Dance instruction ==
Garib teaches Bhang 'n' Beats and Bollywood dance classes at the Cornerstone Studio in Toronto, Ontario. Garib is the owner of the Penticton School of Dance in Penticton, British Columbia.
