= West Summerland station =

Railway station in British Columbia, Canada

West Summerland
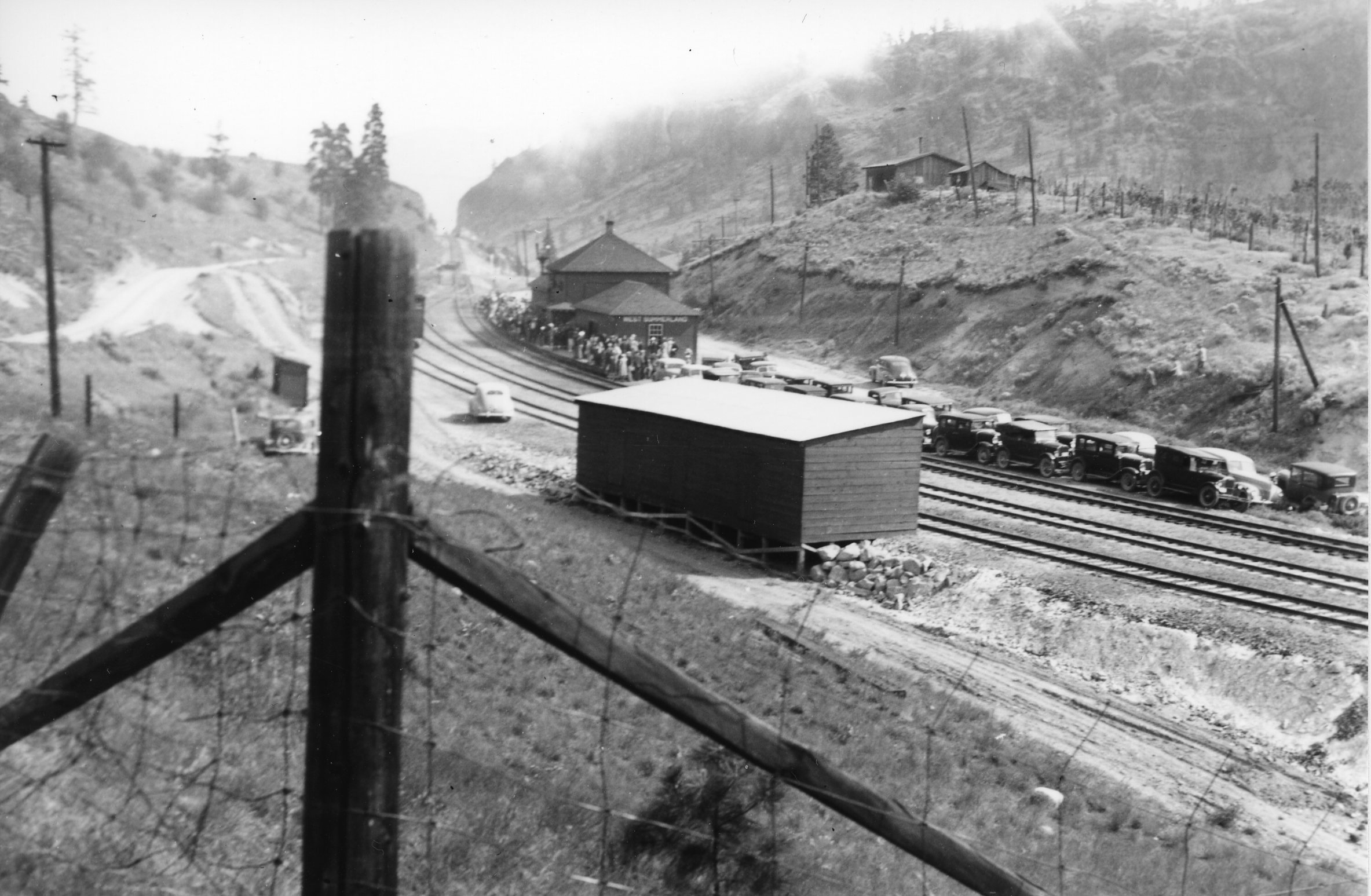
- West Summerland station in 1941

General information
- Location: Victoria Road, Summerland, BC; Canada
- Coordinates: 49°35′04″N 119°41′00″W
- Owner: Kettle Valley Railway
- Platforms: 1 side platform
- Tracks: 3

Construction
- Structure type: 2 storey wooden building

History
- Opened: 1915
- Closed: 1964
- Rebuilt: 1976
Location

West Summerland was a railway station in Summerland, British Columbia, Canada, built for the Kettle Valley Railway in 1915. It was used in regular passenger service as a stop on the Princeton subdivision until 1964, when station operations ceased. The building later housed the Summerland Museum from 1976 to 1983, and was demolished in 1985.

The station site is presently located along the Kettle Valley Steam Railway, which operates on the former line, albeit trains do not halt.

Due to the ongoing 2026 Bald Range fire, the heritage railway has moved No. 3716 and all other rail equipment to West Summerland station to prevent the consist from being damaged.

== History ==
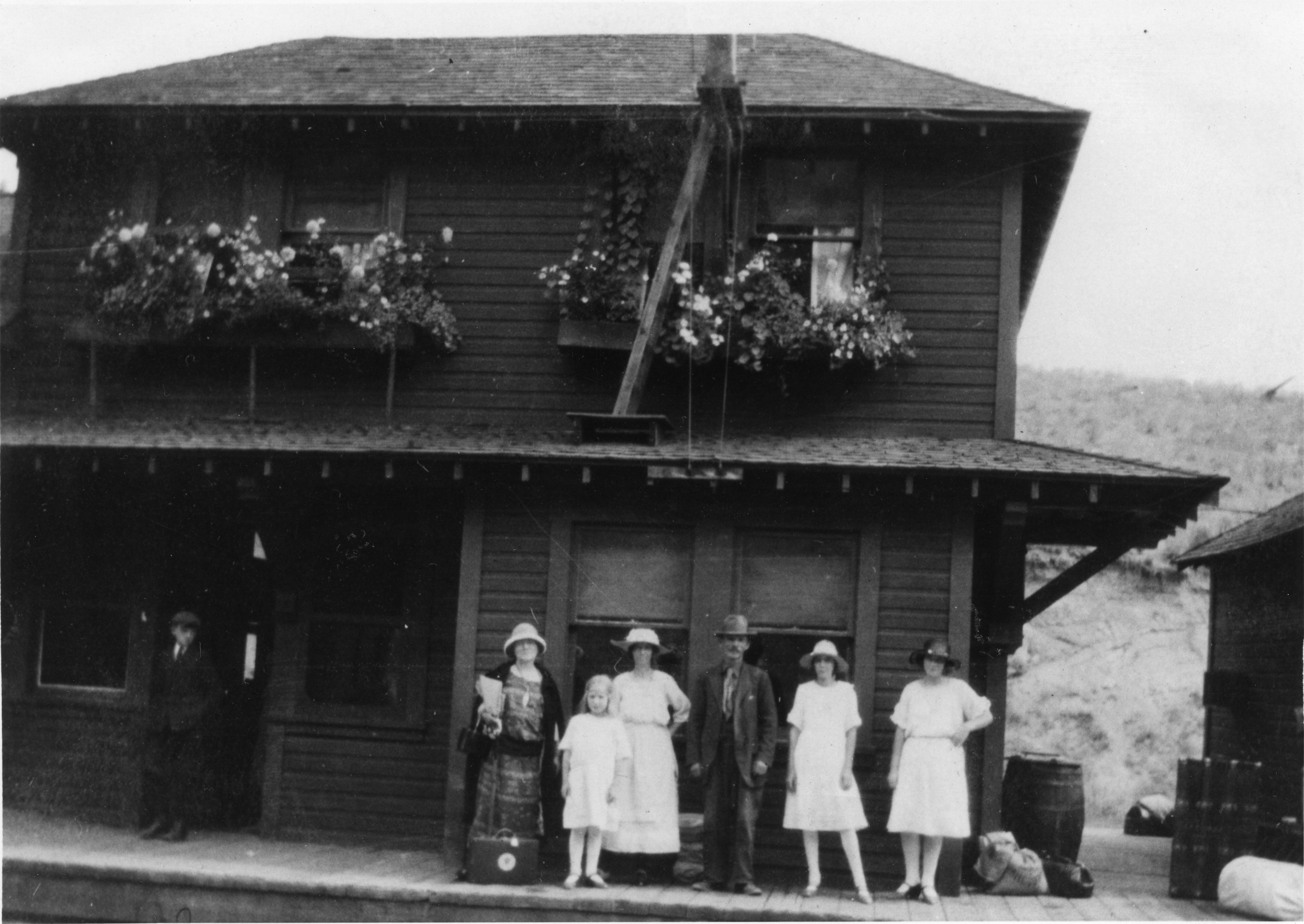
Platform of West Summerland station in 1924

Following the official incorporation of Summerland in 1906, the municipality had access to the nearby communities of Peachland, Naramata, and Princeton through roadways and ferry operations. Despite this, the planned Kettle Valley Railway project intended to bypass Summerland at the time. In 1910, developer and settler James Ritchie surveyed the land and proposed a route including Summerland while shortening the line by 1-kilometre. Railway engineer Andrew McCulloch also devised a route which travelled from Penticton into Summerland and northwards through the Trout Creek Canyon.

The line was officially opened on May 31, 1915, when passenger service commenced on the railway, albeit the station had not been constructed. The first train was hauled by locomotive No. 4 and consisted of a baggage car, coach, and sleeper car, arriving at the West Summerland station stie at 15:59 to a crowd of 2,000 people. The station completed construction later in 1915, being classified as a Canadian Pacific special wood frame building.

With a decline in rail service, the final passenger train stopped at West Summerland on January 16, 1964, on an eastwards trip to Pentiction made by RDC No. 9022. Freight trains continued to travel over the subdivision until March 1, 1989, after which all operations ceased.

The station was repurposed for the Summerland Museum in 1976 for display of their artifacts and archival collection. Although the society sought to relocate the station, two vehicle collisions prevented the plans. The station saw its first passenger train after several years in 1977, when the British Columbia Provincial Museum Train, hauled by Canadian Pacific 3716 which would unbeknownstly be brought to Summerland, made a brief stop at the station. After the completion of the current museum building in 1983, West Summerland was vacated. It was subsequently demolished in 1985. The ticket booth was saved by the museum and remains in their collection.

== Station replica ==
West Summerland

General information
- Location: Victoria Road, Summerland, BC; Canada
- Coordinates: 49°35′04″N 119°41′00″W
- Owner: District of Summerland; Kettle Valley Railway Society; Rotary Club of Summerland
- Platforms: 1 side platform
- Tracks: 1

Construction
- Structure type: Wooden shelter

History
- Opened: 2020
Location

A West Summerland replica structure was opened in 2020 through the collaborative efforts of the District of Summerland, Kettle Valley Steam Railway, Rotary Club of Summerland, Kinsmen Club of Summerland, Summerland Timber Mart, and private individuals. Construction began in 2019 was completed the following year. The shelter, located on the site of the original station, features a cupola and locomotive weather vane atop, as well as picnic tables, bike racks, and route maps for hikers on the Kettle Valley Rail Trail. It sits besides the Kettle Valley Steam Railway, which runs along the former trackage of the railway.

== See also ==
- Prairie Valley station
