= Prairie Valley station =

Railway station in British Columbia, Canada

Prairie Valley
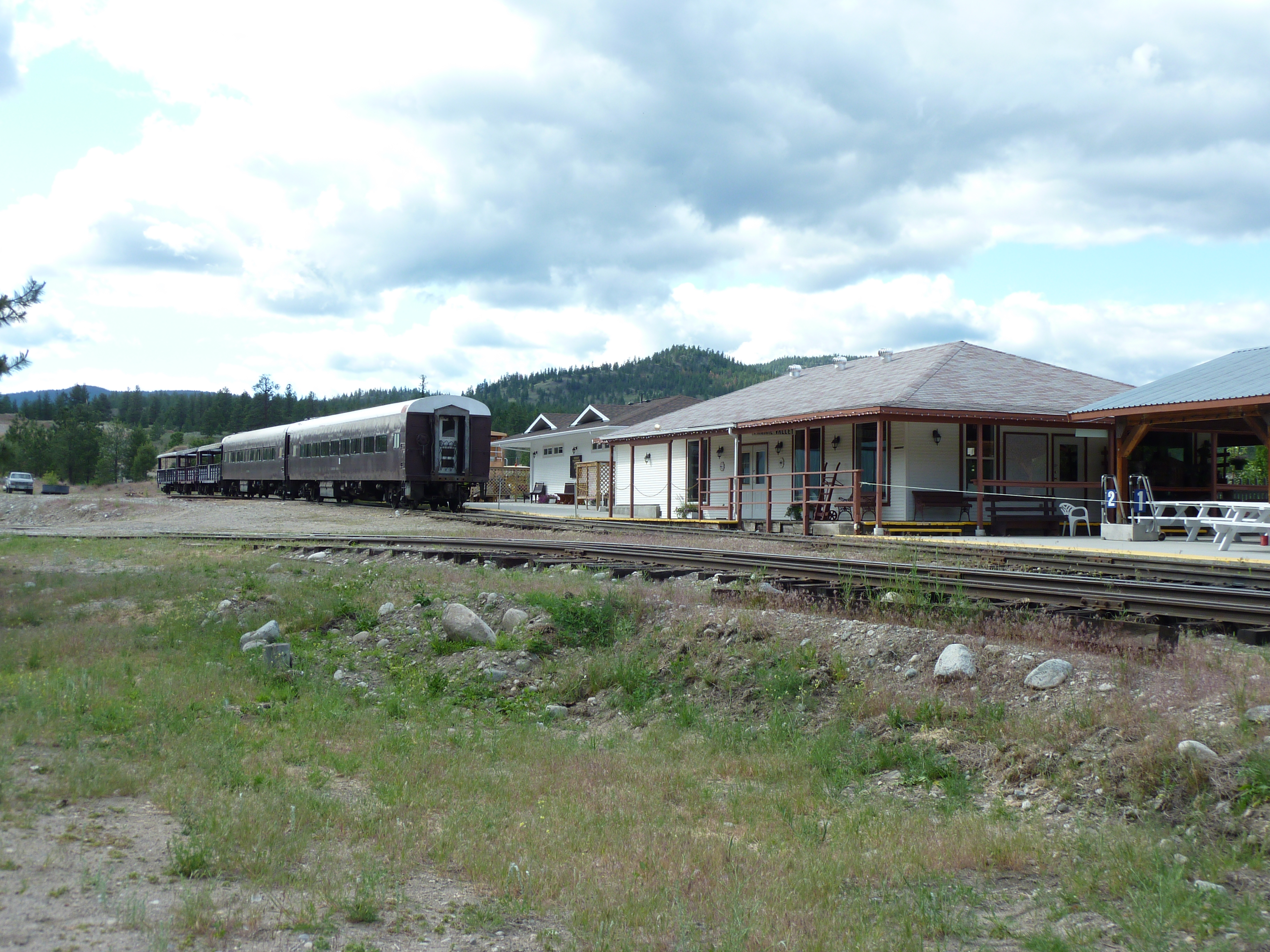
- Prairie Valley station in 2011

General information
- Location: Bathville Road, Summerland, BC; Canada
- Coordinates: 49.587°N 119.733°W
- Owner: Kettle Valley Steam Railway

History
- Original company: Canadian Pacific Railway (line)

Services
Preceding station	Heritage railways	Following station
Terminus	Kettle Valley Steam Railway	Trout Creek Bridge (no station here) Terminus
Location

Prairie Valley is a station in Summerland, British Columbia, Canada, which was built for the Kettle Valley Steam Railway. The Canadian Pacific Railway no longer operates trains over the railway line, which was disconnected from the Canadian Pacific mainline and abandoned between 1961 and 1989. The Kettle Valley Steam Railway operates steam excursion trains over the line, using this facility as its main boarding station.

The station and adjacent shops are currently under threat of severe damage due to the ongoing Bald Range fire, which has likely spread to this section of the railway. All rail equipment was safely moved to West Summerland before evacuation orders, leaving the state of the station unknown.

== See also ==
- West Summerland station
