= Mineola =

Mineola may refer to:

== Populated places ==
=== United States ===
- Mineola, Arkansas
- Mineola, former name of Alleene, Arkansas
- Mineola, Georgia
- Mineola, Iowa
- Mineola, Missouri
- Mineola, New York
- Mineola, Texas

=== Canada ===
- Mineola, British Columbia, a ghost town
- Mineola, a neighbourhood in Mississauga, Ontario

== Schools ==
- Mineola High School (New York)
- Mineola Union Free School District, New York
- Mineola Colored High School, Texas
- Mineola High School (Texas)
- Mineola Independent School District, Texas

== Other ==
- Mineola (moth genus)

== See also ==
- Mineola station (disambiguation), railroad stations of the name
- Minneola (disambiguation)
