= Canadian Pacific class N2 =

Class of 2-8-0 locomotives, built 1912–1914

Canadian Pacific N-2-a,b,c
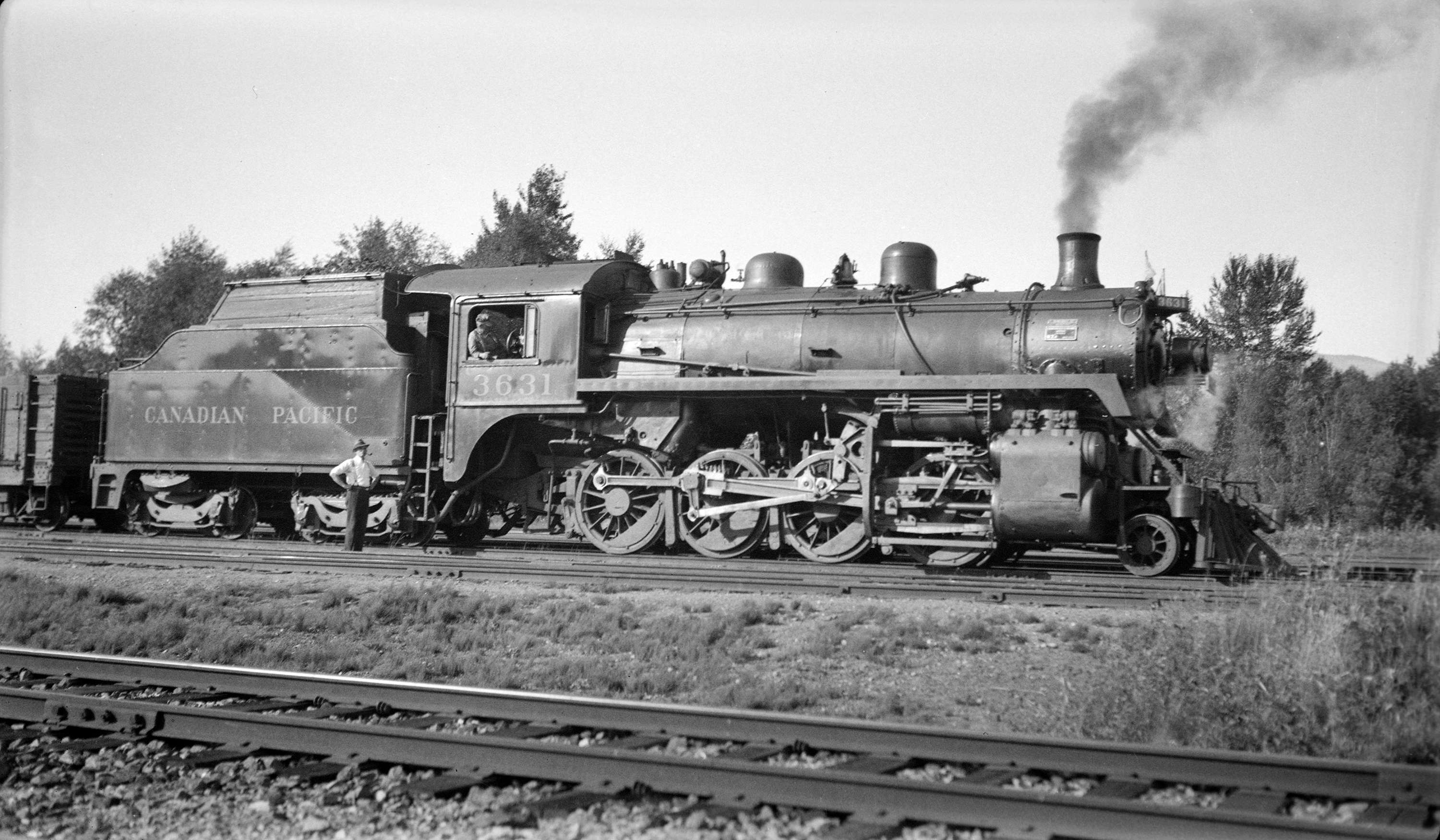
- Canadian Pacific N2a No. 3631 in 1935
Type and origin
- Power type: Steam
- Builder: Montreal Locomotive Works; Canadian Locomotive Company; Canadian Car and Foundry; CPR Angus Shops
- Build date: 1912 to 1914
- Total produced: 199
Specifications
- Configuration
  - Whyte: 2-8-0
  - UIC: 1′D
- Gauge: 4 ft 8 1/2 in (1,435 mm)
- Leading dia.: 31 in (0.79 m)
- Driver dia.: 63 in (1.6 m)
- Wheelbase: Coupled: 16 ft 6 in (5.03 m); Loco: 25 ft 2 in (7.67 m); Loco and tender: 64 ft 7/8 in (19.529 m)
- Length: 75 ft 5 1/2 in (23.000 m)
- Height: 15 ft 3 in (4.65 m)
- Adhesive weight: 211,000 lb (96 t)
- Loco weight: 236,000 lb (107 t)
- Tender weight: 139,000 lb (63 t)
- Fuel type: Originally coal, later oil
- Fuel capacity: 12 short tons (11 t) coal
- Water cap.: 5,000 imp gal (23 m^{3}) water
- Boiler pressure: 190 lbf/in^{2} (1.3 MPa)
- Heating surface
  - Firebox: 7,219.125 in^{2} (4.657491 m^{2})
  - Tubes and flues: 563.75 sq in (3,637.1 cm^{2})
  - Total surface: 3,026 sq ft (281.1 m^{2})
- Cylinders: Two, outside
- Cylinder size: 23 in × 32 in (580 mm × 810 mm)
- Valve gear: Walschaerts
- Train heating: Steam heat
Performance figures
- Tractive effort: 43% (43,400 lbf or 193 kN)
Career
- Operators: Canadian Pacific Railways
- Class: N-2-a,b,c
- Numbers: 3800–3999 (later renumbered 3600–3799)
- Retired: 1953–1959
- Preserved: Two: 3651, 3716
- Disposition: Two preserved, remainder scrapped.

The Canadian Pacific N-2-a, b, and c was a class of 2-8-0 "Consolidation" type steam locomotives built between 1912 and 1914. A total of 199 were produced, numbered 3600 through 3799 by the Canadian Pacific Railway and used almost everywhere around the system.

== History ==
=== Development and design ===
The engines were ordered when Canadian Pacific sought bigger locomotives for their mainline. Their current fleet were wearing out and too small for the loads being hauled.

=== Construction ===
While majority of the class was constructed by the Montreal Locomotive Works, orders were also placed with the Canadian Locomotive Company and Canadian Car and Foundry, with one locomotive being built by the CPR Angus Shops.

=== Modifications ===
These locomotives were originally built under the N3 class beginning in 1909 and numbered 3800 through 3999. They were renumbered between 1920 and 1929 to the 3600s and 3700s. Most of the class were converted to oil-firing in the later years.

In the 1920s onward Canadian Pacific saw an increasing need for larger locomotives. Most of this class were relocated to either CP's Ogden or Montreal shops for a short time while 65 were converted to Class P1n 2-8-2, renumbered 5200–5264 in 1946. A larger boiler was added as well as a trailing truck and a new cab. They could haul several thousand pounds more than the original 2-8-0s could. Many of this class were converted, although not all, as many survived as 2-8-0s until the end of steam on CP.

== Preservation ==
Of the 199 locomotives that were built, only two remain in existence.

Preserved N2 locomotives
Type	Number	Image	Date built	Serial number	Location	Coordinates	Notes
N2a	3651		July 1910	48339	Lethbridge Station, Lethbridge, Alberta	49.69835°N 112.83646°W	On static display behind the station.
N2b	3716		October 1912	51628	Kettle Valley Steam Railway, Summerland, British Columbia	49.58700°N 119.73417°W	Hauls excursion trains since 2003. Previously served as a backup locomotive for Canadian Pacific No. 2860 from 1975 to 2001.

== See also ==
- List of heritage railways in Canada
- Kettle Valley Steam Railway
