= Summerland Jets =

Junior ice hockey franchise

Summerland Jets HC
- City: Summerland
- League: BCHC
- Founded: 2026
- Home arena: Summerland Arena
- Colours: Blue; Red
- Owner: Summerland Jr. B Hockey Society
- Head coach: Robert Dirk
- Website: summerlandjets.com

The Summerland Jets Hockey Club is a junior ice hockey club and franchise of the British Columbia Hockey Conference (BCHC) based in Summerland, British Columbia. The Jets initially joined the Kootenay International Junior Hockey League (KIJHL) as an expansion franchise for the 2026–27 season, before joining the BCHC in April 2026 as part of BC Hockey's restructuring of Junior A in British Columbia. It is owned and operated by the community-led Summerland Jr. B Hockey Society. The team will play out of the 800-seat Summerland Arena which opened in 1976.

== History ==
In the 1980s, Summerland was home to the Summerland Buckaroos, a Junior A team in the British Columbia Hockey League that relocated from Kelowna. The Buckaroos ceased operations in 1988 following three straight losing seasons.

In 2001, the Summerland Sting began playing in the Kootenay International Junior Hockey League (KIJHL). In 2009, the team moved to Penticton to become the Penticton Lakers. The team has since relocated to 100 Mile House and become the 100 Mile House Wranglers.

Two seasons later, in 2011–12, the KIJHL returned to Summerland. The Summerland Steam played in the KIJHL for 12 seasons before being relocated to Williams Lake and becoming the Williams Lake Mustangs in 2024.

In October 2025, the District of Summerland council endorsed a proposal to bring junior hockey back to the community.

On February 12, 2026, the KIJHL announced that it would once again return to Summerland, starting in 2026–27. On March 18, 2026, it was announced that the new team would be called the Summerland Jets, taking its name from the existing minor hockey association that has been in the community since the 1980s. This coincided with the KIJHL and BC Hockey's restructuring of Junior A hockey in British Columbia. On April 22, 2026, the KIJHL announced that 14 of its member clubs, including the Summerland Jets, would be joining the new British Columbia Hockey Conference (BCHC) for 2026–27.

On April 22, 2026, the Jets announced that Robert Dirk would be the team's first head coach.

== Sources ==
- Lacey, Keith (13 October 2025). "Summerland Steam will be returning to KIJHL". castanet.net.
- "KIJHL returning to Summerland for 2026–27 season". kijhl.ca. Kootenay International Junior Hockey League. 12 February 2026.
- Arendt, John (13 February 2026). "Junior hockey franchise coming back to Summerland". Summerland Review.
- "United as Jets: Summerland aligns with Minor Hockey". kijhl.ca. Kootenay International Junior Hockey League. 17 March 2026.
- Arendt, John (18 March 2026). "New Summerland junior hockey team to use Jets name". keremeosreview.com. Keremeos Review.
- Powrie, Chelsea (17 March 2026). "'Summerland Jets' officially named as the KIJHL expansion team for 2026-27". castanet.net.
- Lacey, Keith (1 August 2026). "Free ice time to help Jets takeoff in Summerland". Penticton Herald.
