= Kettle Valley Steam Railway =

Heritage railway line in Canada

Coordinates: 49.587013°N 119.7329535°W

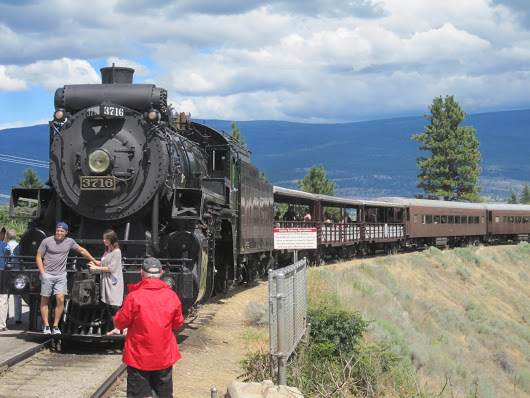
- Kettle Valley 3716 at Canyon View Siding
- Locale: British Columbia, Canada

Commercial operations
- Built by: Canadian Pacific
- Original gauge: 4 ft 8 1/2 in (1,435 mm) standard gauge

Preserved operations
- Owned by: Kettle Valley Railway Heritage Society
- Reporting mark: KVSR
- Stations: 1
- Length: 10 km (6.2 mi)
- Preserved gauge: 4 ft 8 1/2 in (1,435 mm)

Commercial history
- Opened: 1915
- Closed to passengers: 1964
- Closed: 1989

Preservation history
- 1990: Purchased by the Government of British Columbia
- September 17, 1995: Tourist operations begin
- May 22, 2005: Inaugural run of No. 3716
- August 7, 2026: Operations suspended
- September 5, 2026: Operations resume
- Headquarters: Summerland, British Columbia

Website
- www.kettlevalleyrail.org

The Kettle Valley Steam Railway (reporting mark KVSR) is a heritage railway near Summerland, British Columbia. Opened in 1995 by the Kettle Valley Railway Society, the line runs from Prairie Valley station on Bathville Road to the Trout Creek trestle bridge. Excursion trains are primarily hauled by Canadian Pacific 3716, a 2-8-0 steam locomotive purchased in 2003.

== History ==
The Kettle Valley Steam Railway is operated by the Kettle Valley Railway Society, a non-profit charitable organization focused on the preservation of railway heritage in the Okanagan Valley. The KVR Society is run by a board of directors, community volunteers, and trained personnel.

Tourist operations of Kettle Valley Steam Railway officially began on September 17, 1995. The KVSR operates excursion trains over the only remaining section of the Kettle Valley Railway. This section runs from Faulder to Trout Creek, running through West Summerland and the Prairie Valley railway station. The line runs through vistas, orchards, vineyards, and over the 73-metre-tall (238 ft) Trout Creek Trestle. Trains are operated from spring through fall each year and include special events such as the "Great Train Robbery" and "Christmas Express".

Trains are pulled by ex-Canadian Pacific No. 3716, built in 1912 as a 2-8-0 "Consolidation" type steam locomotive under the N2B class. The railway also has an ALCO S-6 diesel electric locomotive (originally Southern Pacific No. 1050, more recently owned by Portland Terminals, then Neptune Bulk Terminals in North Vancouver). Between 1995 and 2009 a two-truck Shay locomotive, Mayo Lumber No. 3 was on loan from the BC Forest Discovery Centre in Duncan; it was returned to Duncan on September 17, 2009. Passenger rolling stock includes two ex-CP coaches and three ex-CP stock cars converted into open-air cars. All trains depart the Prairie Valley railway station in Summerland.

In May 2023, the railway acquired coach No. 405 from the Kamloops Heritage Railway, transported by trailer on May 12. The passenger car was originally built as No. 5611 for Canadian National Railways and later transferred to Via Rail in 1978. In 1995, it was purchased by Les Trains Touristiques du Saint-Laurent in Quebec and named Cap Brûlé. After short careers with the Waterloo–St. Jacobs Railway and Rocky Mountaineer, it was transferred to the Kamloops Heritage Railway, titled Kenna Cartwright Park. The car has since been restored as Brookmere and increased capacity for special operations.

As of 2026, the Kettle Valley Steam Railway is home to one of the few remaining operational steam locomotives in Canada.

On August 7, 2026, railway operations were suspended due to the ongoing Bald Range fire covering all of Summerland. It was unknown if the Prairie Valley station and shops have been damaged, although crews have moved the rail equipment, including the two locomotives and coaches, to the former West Summerland station. Railway personnel have confirmed that the trestle and rail equipment are intact. Tourist operations resumed the following month on September 5, 2026.

== Equipment ==
=== Locomotives ===
Locomotive details
Number	Image	Type	Model	Built	Builder	Former owner	Status	Notes
3716		Steam	2-8-0	1912	Montreal Locomotive Works	Canadian Pacific Railway	Operational	Originally No. 3916 until 1929. Operated by the British Columbia Railway between 1975 and 2001.
803		Diesel	S-6	1956	American Locomotive Company	Southern Pacific Railroad	Operational	Previously used by to Neptune Bulk Terminals until 2009.

=== Passenger cars ===
Passenger car details
Number	Name	Image	Type	Built	Builder	Notes
405	Brookmere		Coach	1954	Canadian Car and Foundry	Named after Brookmere. Originally Canadian National/Via Rail No. 5611. Recently owned by the Kamloops Heritage Railway.
2241	West Summerland		Coach	1949	Canadian Car and Foundry/CPR Angus Shops	Named after West Summerland station. Previously operated by BC Rail as Lillooet. To be converted to a dining car.
2270	Faulder		Coach	1950	Canadian Car and Foundry/CPR Angus Shops	Named after Faulder. Previously operated by BC Rail as Mackenzie.
6600	Canyon View		Coach	1950	Canadian Car and Foundry/CPR Angus Shops	Named after Canyon View in Summerland. Previously operated by BC Rail as lounge car Shannon Falls. Originally No. 2289.
278513			Open car	1958	Canadian Car and Foundry	Acquired in 1997. Originally No. 277191 until renumbering in 1977.
278514			Open car	1958	Canadian Car and Foundry	Acquired in 1997. Originally No. 277086 until renumbering in 1977.
278517			Open car	1958	Canadian Car and Foundry	Acquired in 1997. Originally number unknown.
278521			Open car	1958	Canadian Car and Foundry	Acquired in 1997 and displayed as a derelict body outside the parking lot. Originally No. 277088 until renumbering in 1977.

=== Freight cars ===
Freight car details
Number	Image	Type	Built	Builder	Notes
1902		Tank car	1937	Unknown	Originally used by the British Columbia Railway, then part of the West Coast Railway Association until 2004.
60902		Flatcar	Unknown	Unknown	Originally built for Canadian National Railways.
434432		Caboose	1973	CPR Angus Shops	Acquired in May 1994. Originally Canadian Pacific No. 438904 until being renumbered in 1975.
-		Tank car	Unknown	Procor	Originally operated by Procor.
-		Tank car	Unknown	Procor	Originally operated by Procor.

== See also ==
- List of heritage railways in Canada
- Kettle Valley Railway
