= Faulder =

Place in British Columbia, Canada

Coordinates: 49°36′40″N 119°46′55″W

Faulder is a railway point located in British Columbia, Canada, situated in a large valley 10 km (6.2 mi) west of the town of Summerland. This is also the end point of the Kettle Valley Steam Railway. Named after Evelyn Robert Faulder, it consists of many large acreages and agricultural farms.

Faulder has become an area of controversy lately as high levels of uranium have been found in the community's drinking water.

In August 2026, the Bald Range fire destroyed all but eight of the 81 homes located in Faulder.

== Notable people ==
- Calum Bird, entrepreneur and founder of Trelent, a cloud-based technology platform.
