= Summerland Arena =

Indoor arena in British Columbia, Canada

Coordinates: 49°36′15″N 119°40′29″W

- Interactive map of Summerland Arena
- Location: 8820 Jubilee Rd E Summerland, British Columbia; V0H 1Z0
- Owner: District of Summerland
- Capacity: 800

Construction
- Opened: March 27, 1976
- Cost: CA$2.4 million (1976)

Tenants
- Summerland Buckaroos (BCHL) (1983–1988); Summerland Sting (KIJHL) (2001–2009); Summerland Steam (KIJHL) (2011–2024); Summerland Jets (BCHC) (2026–present)

Summerland Arena is an indoor arena located in Summerland, British Columbia. It is owned by the District of Summerland. Summerland Arena has a capacity of 800 for hockey games. It is the home of the Summerland Jets of the British Columbia Hockey Conference (BCHC) and the Summerland Minor Hockey Association.

== History ==
Summerland Arena was built at a cost of CA$2.4 million, with CA$1.159 million being funded by taxpayers and the remaining CA$1.241 million coming from a grant. The arena opened on March 27, 1976, along with the Summerland Aquatic and Fitness Centre. The arena celebrated its 50th anniversary on March 27, 2026, with a free skate, along with free swim at the aquatic centre.

== Sports ==
The arena has been home to various junior hockey teams through the years. In 1983, the Summerland Buckaroos of the British Columbia Hockey League (BCHL) relocated from Kelowna and used the Summerland Arena as its home before their demise in 1988. In 2001, the Summerland Sting joined the Kootenay International Junior Hockey League (KIJHL) and used the Summerland Arena as its home until the team's relocation to Penticton to become the Penticton Lakers. The KIJHL came back to Summerland in 2011, when the Summerland Steam began play at the arena. The Steam played in the Summerland Arena for 12 seasons before relocating to Williams Lake in 2024.

On October 13, 2025, the District of Summerland council endorsed a proposal to bring junior hockey back to Summerland. On February 12, 2026, the KIJHL announced that it would once again return to Summerland, starting in 2026–27. On March 18, 2026, it was announced that the new team would be named the Summerland Jets, taking its name from the existing minor hockey association that has been playing at the arena since the 1980s. On April 22, 2026, the KIJHL, along with BC Hockey, announced that 14 of its teams, including the Jets, would be joining the new Junior A British Columbia Hockey Conference (BCHC) for the 2026–27 season.
