= Nicole Dunsdon =

Canadian model

- Born: November 7, 1970 (age 55); Summerland, British Columbia
- Citizenship: Canada
- Education: Summerland Secondary School; University of Alberta; University of Western Ontario
- Occupation: Journalist
- Years active: 1995–present
- Spouse: Greg Fulmes
- Children: Spencer Kryczka, Lindsay Kryczka, Harrison Kryczka

Nicole Dunsdon (born November 7, 1970) is a Canadian model and beauty pageant titleholder who was the last person to win the Miss Canada competition before it was cancelled in 1992. The title was resurrected in 2009.

== Biography ==
Dunsdon was born November 7, 1970. She is from Summerland, British Columbia.

She graduated from Summerland Secondary School in 1988; from the University of Alberta with a Bachelor of Arts in Psychology in 1994; and from the University of Western Ontario with a Master of Arts in Journalism the following year. More recently, Dunsdon completed a Creative Writing Certificate at the University of Calgary in 2026.

Dunsdon was crowned Miss Canada in October 1991. She also competed in Miss Universe 1992 in Bangkok, Thailand.

Some women's organizations considered the Miss Canada pageant to encourage the sexual objectification of women. Dunsdon said in 2009 that there are beauty pageant contestants that meet the stereotypes; "egotistical, materialistic, slightly air-headed and ill-informed... but those ones never win." She ascribed the cancellation of the pageant to the early 1990s recession, and expressed disappointment "that something as traditional as the Miss Canada pageant was touchable by the economic recession."

As a book editor, she was one of the editors of Harold McGill's memoirs. In addition to editing three books, Dunsdon worked as a journalist for over 16 years with The Calgary Herald and The Globe and Mail before taking a position in communications with SAIT Polytechnic's Applied Research and Innovation Services department. Dunsdon later became a communications specialist at the University of Calgary's Schulich School of Engineering. Her communications and marketing leadership opportunities then took Dunsdon into management for non-profit organizations Caregivers Alberta and Wood's Homes. Today, Dunsdon is working on a historical fiction novel based in Bankhead, AB focused on the stories of the people who lived in this 20-year-town - now a ghost town. She hopes to publish in 2028.

== Family ==
Dunsdon married Patrick Kryczka, and was the daughter-in-law of Joe Kryczka. The relationship ended in 2015. Dunsdon and Kryczka's son Spencer played hockey for the Okotoks Oilers, and the Princeton Tigers. Dunsdon also has a daughter, Lindsay, and a son, Harrison. Dunsdon re-married in 2020. Her partner, Greg Fulmes, is a photojournalist.
