= Princess Margaret Secondary School (Penticton) =

Location
- 120 Green Avenue W. Penticton, British Columbia, V2A 3T1; Canada; 49.4628°N 119.5835°W

Information
- School type: Public, high school
- Motto: Home of the Mustangs
- School board: School District 67 Okanagan Skaha
- Principal: Bo Boxall
- Staff: 54
- Grades: 8-12
- Enrollment: 650 (approx.)
- Language: English
- Colour: Red White Black
- Team name: Mustangs
- Website: princessmargaret.sd67.bc.ca

Princess Margaret Secondary School (also known as PMSS or "Maggie") is a public secondary school in Penticton, British Columbia, Canada. It is operated by School District 67 Okanagan Skaha. It is one of two secondary schools in Penticton and one of three in the school district. The school is fed from four elementary schools and one middle school. The school includes a significant number of students from the local First Nations Penticton Indian Band and is located within the traditional Okanagan Nation territory. PMSS is named for Princess Margaret, Countess of Snowden, sister of Elizabeth II, Queen of Canada.

== Academics ==
During 2005-2011 an average of 91% of first time Grade 12 students graduated.

== Activities & elective programs ==
- Learning Centre
- Aboriginal Education Program
- AIM (Alternate Instruction At Maggie)
- Student Voice (Students' Council)
- Leadership Class
- Peer Counsellors
- Horseshoe Theatre
- Adventure Tourism
- Peer Tutors
- Work Learn
- Female Fitness
- Fine Arts
- Work Experience/Career Prep.
- Cafeteria Training
- Super Fit
- Intramurals
- Athletics
- Sports Academy
- Photography
- Yearbook

== Physical Education ==
The following programs are offered through the school's PE department:

- Soccer
- Volleyball
- Outdoor Games
- Dance
- Basketball
- Weight Training
- Wrestling
- Self-Defense
- Gymnastics
- Softball
- Golf
- Racquet Sports
- Community Life
- Active Health
- Cooperative Games
- Flag Football
- Bowling
- Curling
- Driver's Ed
- Badminton
- Female Fit
- Rock Climbing
- Adventure Tourism
- Female Fit
- Multi-Sport
- Soccer Center
- SuperFit
- Weight Training
- Strength & Conditioning

== History and facilities ==
The school officially opened in September 1958 with 200 students enrolled in Grades 2‐9. The next year, Grades 1 and 10 were added. Due to a growing population at the south end of the city, an elementary school, Snowdon Elementary, was built on the grounds in the early 1960s, and students from Grades 7 - 10 attended PMS. In 2002 the school was converted to a grade 9-12 secondary school and underwent a $9.4 million renovation that also expanded its capacity from 475 to 650.

Notable Alumni Include:
