= MacMillan Bloedel and Powell River 1077 =

Preserved 2-6-2 "Prairie" type steam locomotive

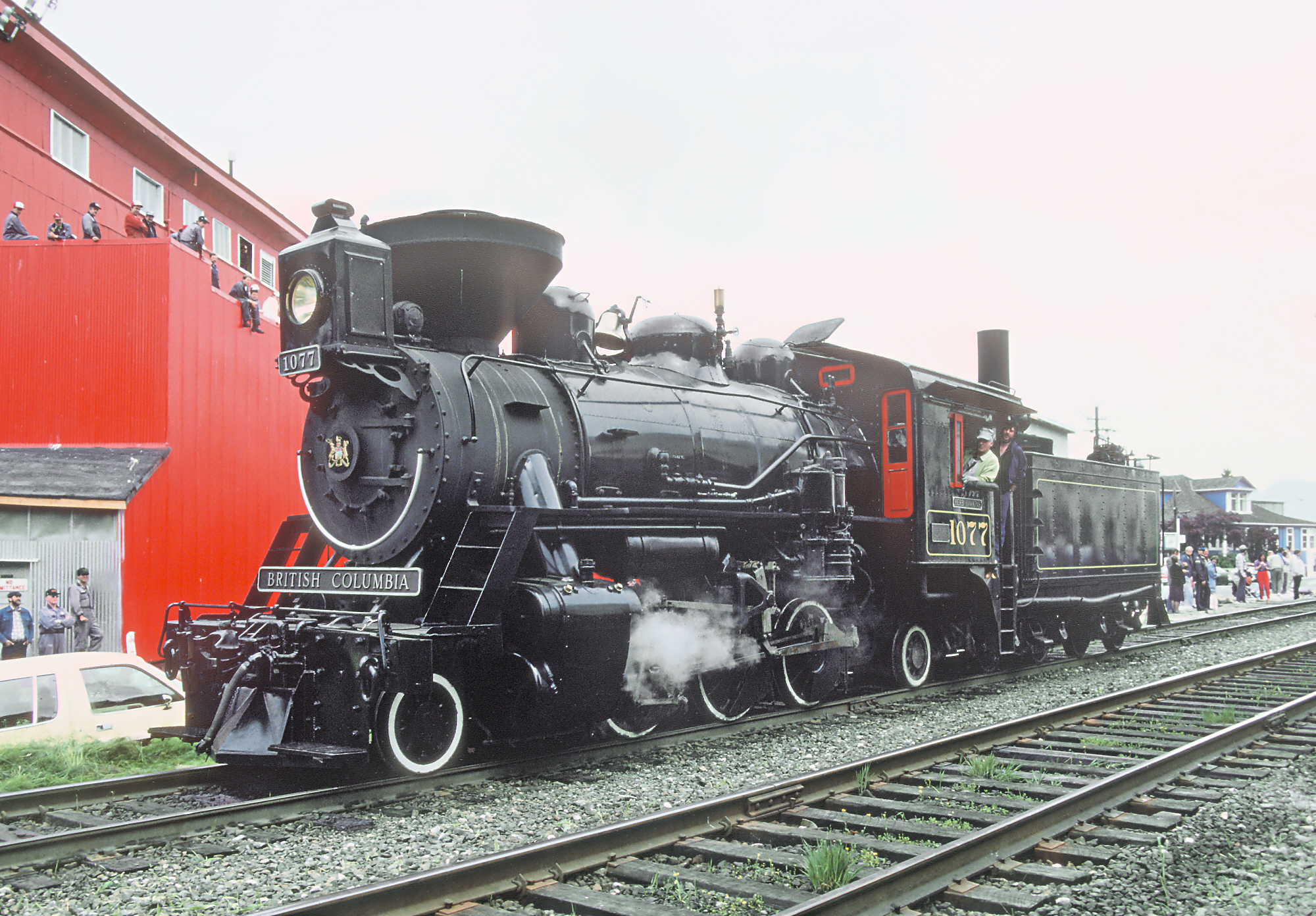
- No. 1077 taking part in the Steam Expo locomotive parade at the 1986 World Exposition
Type and origin
- Power type: Steam
- Builder: Montreal Locomotive Works
- Serial number: 65377
- Build date: December 1923
Specifications
- Configuration
  - Whyte: 2-6-2
- Gauge: 1,435 mm (4 ft 8 1/2 in)
- Driver dia.: 42 in (1.067 m)
- Wheelbase: 10 ft 6 in (3.20 m)
- Height: 14 ft 15 in (4.65 m)
- Adhesive weight: 84,000 lb (38.1 t)
- Loco weight: 125,000 lb (57,000 kg)
- Tender weight: 95,000 lb (43,000 kg)
- Fuel type: New: Wood; New: Oil
- Fuel capacity: Wood: 2 t (2.0 long tons; 2.2 short tons); Oil: 2,500 imp gal (11,000 L; 3,000 US gal)
- Water cap.: 2,000 imp gal (9,100 L; 2,400 US gal)
- Boiler pressure: 180 psi (1.24 MPa)
- Cylinders: Two, outside
- Cylinder size: 17 in × 24 in (430 mm × 610 mm)
- Valve gear: Walschaerts
- Valve type: Piston valves
- Loco brake: Air
- Train brakes: Air
- Couplers: Knuckle
Performance figures
- Tractive effort: 25,265 lbf (112.38 kN)
Career
- Operators: Cathels and Sorenson Logging Company; Victoria Lumber and Manufacturing Company; Nanaimo River Campany; MacMillan Bloedel and Victoria Lumber and Manufacturing; Nanaimo Lakes Logging Railway; The British Columbia Provincial Museum Train; Fort Steele Heritage Town
- Numbers: C&S 1; VL&M Co. 7; MBPR 1077
- Official name: Herb Hawkins
- Retired: December 1969
- Restored: July 1975
- Current owner: Government of British Columbia
- Disposition: Operational

MacMillan Bloedel and Powell River 1077 is a 2-6-2 "Prairie" type steam locomotive, built in 1923 by the Montreal Locomotive Works (MLW). Today, the locomotive is preserved and operated by the Fort Steele Heritage Town in Fort Steele, British Columbia.

== History ==
No. 1077 was built in December 1923 by the Montreal Locomotive Works (MLW) for the Cathels and Sorenson Logging Company as No. 1, it worked for several years for the company hauling logging trains until 1944 when it was sold to the Victoria Lumber and Manufacturing Company and was renumbered to No. 7. It was originally built to burn wood, but was later converted to burn oil.

In 1952, the company later became the MacMillan Bloedel and Victoria Lumber and Manufacturing and the engine was renumbered to No. 1077. It was later moved to the company's Nanaimo Lakes Logging Railway where it was placed in standby service. On September 12, 1967, No. 1077 along with No. 105 ran a special photo excursion charter from Ladysmith to Vancouver Island and return, hosted by the West Coast Railway Association. No. 1077 would continue in revenue service until it was retired in December 1969, after the MacMillan Bloedel and Victoria Lumber and Manufacturing terminated their operations.

In 1974, it was sold to the Province of British Columbia to operate tourist trains for the Provincial Museum train for BC Rail, alongside Canadian Pacific 3716. It was restored to operating condition in July 1975 and was placed in standby power for CP 3716 on Vancouver Island, due to it being too heavy for some of the bridges. There, the engine was given the nickname Herb Hawkins, in honor of the octogenarian boiler-marker who restored the engine to active service. In 1979, after several years of hauling the Provincial Museum Train, the locomotive was put into storage and would remain in storage until 1985, when it was rebuilt to operation to star in a feature film.

In May 1986, the engine participated at SteamExpo 86 in Vancouver British Columbia along with Virginia and Truckee 22 Inyo, Canadian Pacific 374, Canadian Pacific 3, ERM&L Co. 1 Falk, Dunrobin (2nd), PL Co. 12, Great Western 51, AP 2, Canadian National 1392, Union Pacific 4466, Elk River Railroad 1, Quincy Railroad 2, Tom Thumb (1927 Replica), Best Friend of Charleston (1928 Replica), Mount Ranier Railroad 91, John Bull (1939 Replica), Canadian Pacific 2860, Canadian Pacific 1201, Canadian National 6060, John Molson (1970 Replica), and Stephenson's Rocket (1979 Replica).

In 1990, No. 1077 was donated to Fort Steele Heritage Town in Fort Steele, British Columbia, where it now hauls tourist trains around the 2.5-mile track. On July 15, 2023, the museum celebrated the locomotive's 100th birthday.

In April 2024, No. 1077 was taken out of service and put into storage after the Fort Steele Heritage Town suspended operations due to a review for safety, maintenance, and aging equipment concerns. In January 2025, the museum was purchased by the Cranbrook Archives, Museum and Landmark Society and operations were eventually resumed with No. 1077 being rebuilt and return to service.

== Appearances in media ==
- In 1985, the locomotive appeared in The Journey of Natty Gann by Jeremy Kagun, alongside Canadian Pacific 3716.
- In 2000, the locomotive appeared in the film Shanghai Noon by Tom Dey.
