= BC Forest Discovery Centre =

Museum in Duncan, BC, Canada

Coordinates: 48°48′07″N 123°42′55″W

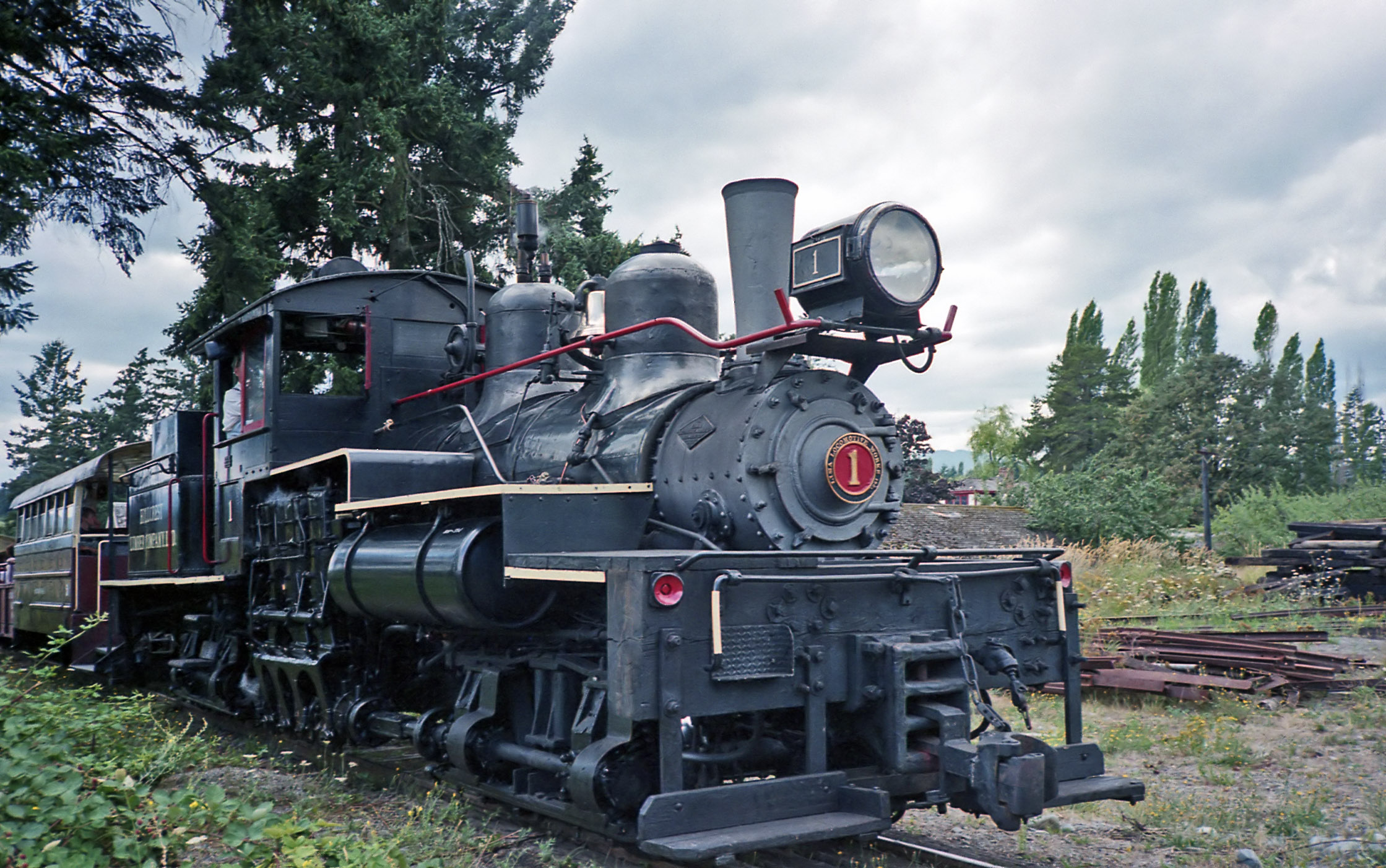
- Hillcrest Lumber Company No. 1, a class B Shay locomotive
- Established: 1964
- Location: 2892 Drinkwater Road, Duncan, British Columbia
- Type: Forestry Museum
- Website: bcforestdiscoverycentre.com

The BC Forest Discovery Centre, located in Duncan, chronicles the history of logging in British Columbia, Canada. It is a 100-acre (40 ha) site with 2.5 km (1.6 miles) of operational 3 ft (914 mm) narrow gauge railway.

== History ==
G.E. (Gerry) Wellburn, a collector, was the founder of the Centre which opened in 1965 as the Cowichan Valley Forest Museum. It was later known for a time as the BC Forest Museum.

== Collection ==
There are indoor and outdoor exhibits spread over a 100-acre (40 ha) site, including operating steam and diesel rail equipment plus logging trucks. There are forest and nature trails, picnic area, playground, gift shop and a concession. At the Centre visitors can explore a reconstructed logging camp, forest fire lookout tower and the ranger's station.

The centre has its own heritage railway, a train pulled by a century-old steam locomotive which was once used in the filling in of the North Vancouver harbour. Along the route is one of the first pre-fabricated school houses, a trestle over Somenos Lake and an operational water wheel.

The Forest Discovery Centre has seven steam locomotives in its collection:

1. Mayo Lumber Company No. 3 Shay (class B) (was on loan to Kettle Valley Steam Railway 1995–2009)
2. Hillcrest Lumber Company No. 1 Shay (class B) (3 ft or 914 mm gauge)
3. Bloedel Stewart and Welch Shay (class B) No. 1 (4 ft 8 1/2 in or 1,435 mm standard gauge)
4. Shawnigan Lake Lumber No. 2 Climax (class B) (4 ft 8 1/2 in standard gauge)
5. Hillcrest Lumber Company No. 9 Climax (class B) (4 ft 8 1/2 in standard gauge) – the only operational Climax locomotive in Canada)
6. Cowichan Valley Railway No. 24 Vulcan 0-4-0T "Suzie" (3 ft gauge)
7. Cowichan Valley Railway No. 25 Vulcan 0-4-0T "Samson" (3 ft gauge)

In addition, these diesel locomotives are also part of the collection:

1. Cowichan Valley Railway No. 23 "Sandy" Plymouth 8-short-ton (7.1-long-ton; 7.3 t)
2. Cowichan Valley Railway No. 27 "Handy Andy" speeder
3. British Columbia Forest Products No. 9 Whitcomb Locomotive Works (80-short-ton or 71-long-ton or 73-tonne 0-4-4-0 diesel)
Collection

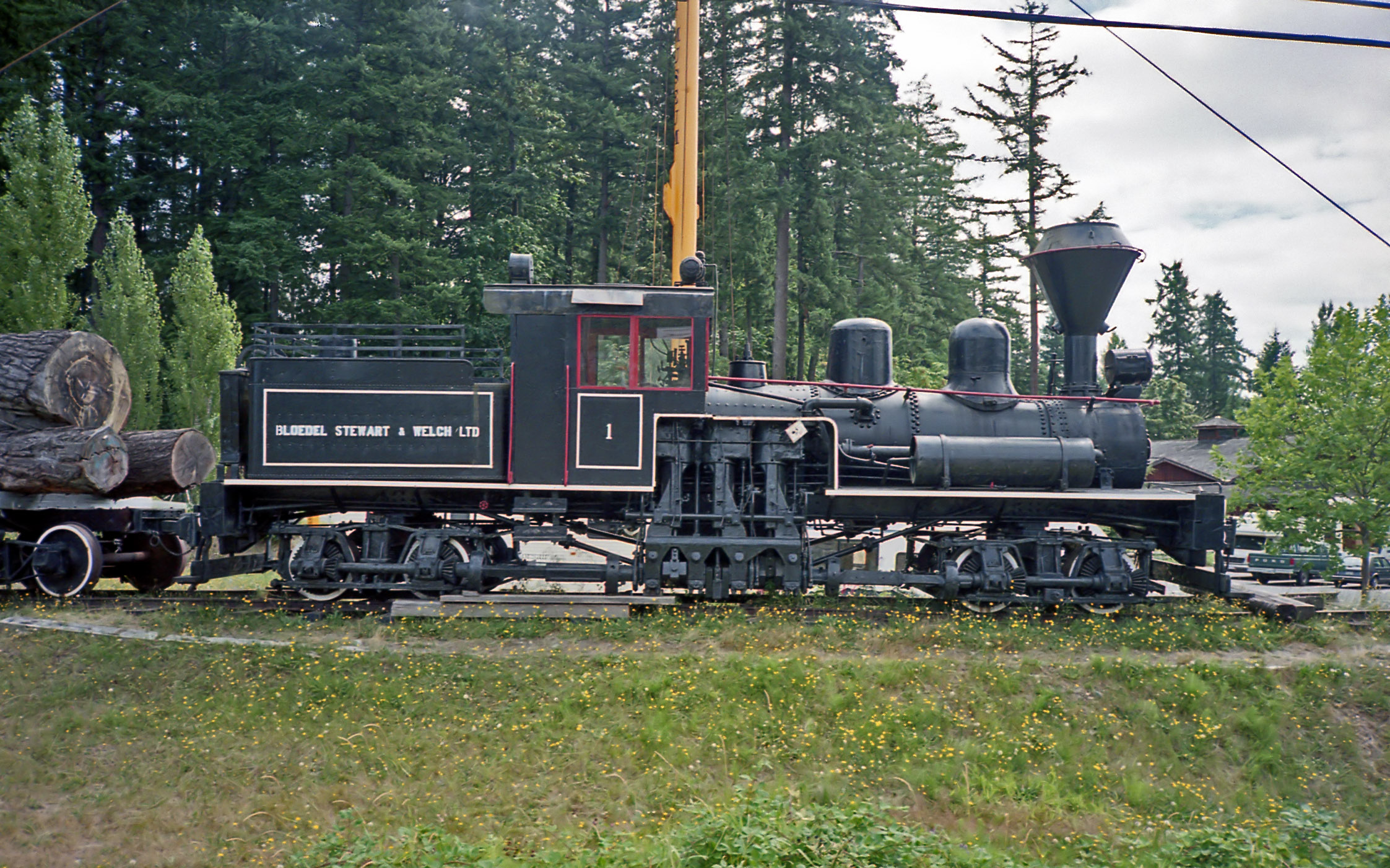
Bloedel Stewart & Welch No. 1 (Shay)

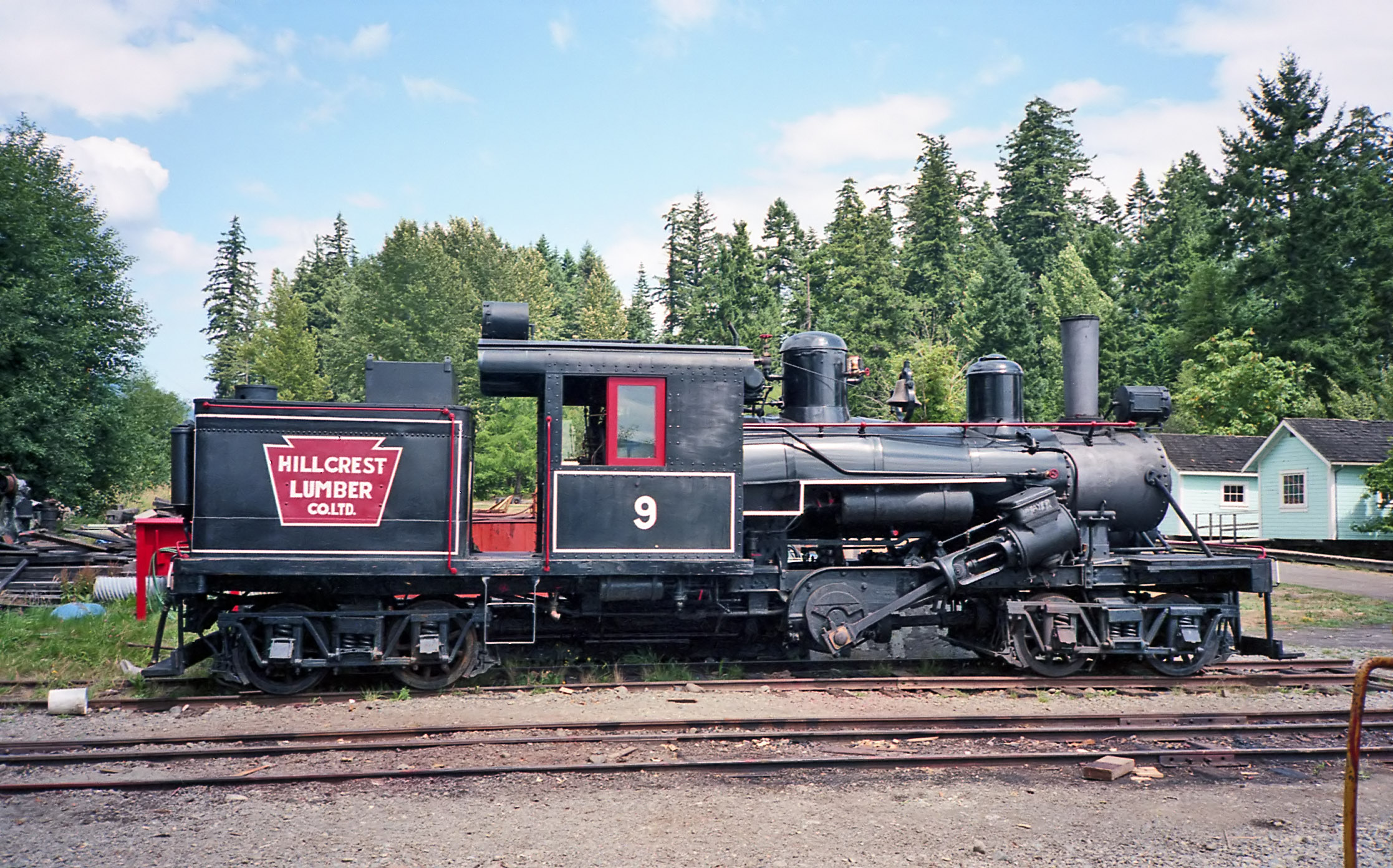
Hillcrest Lumber Company No. 9 (Climax)

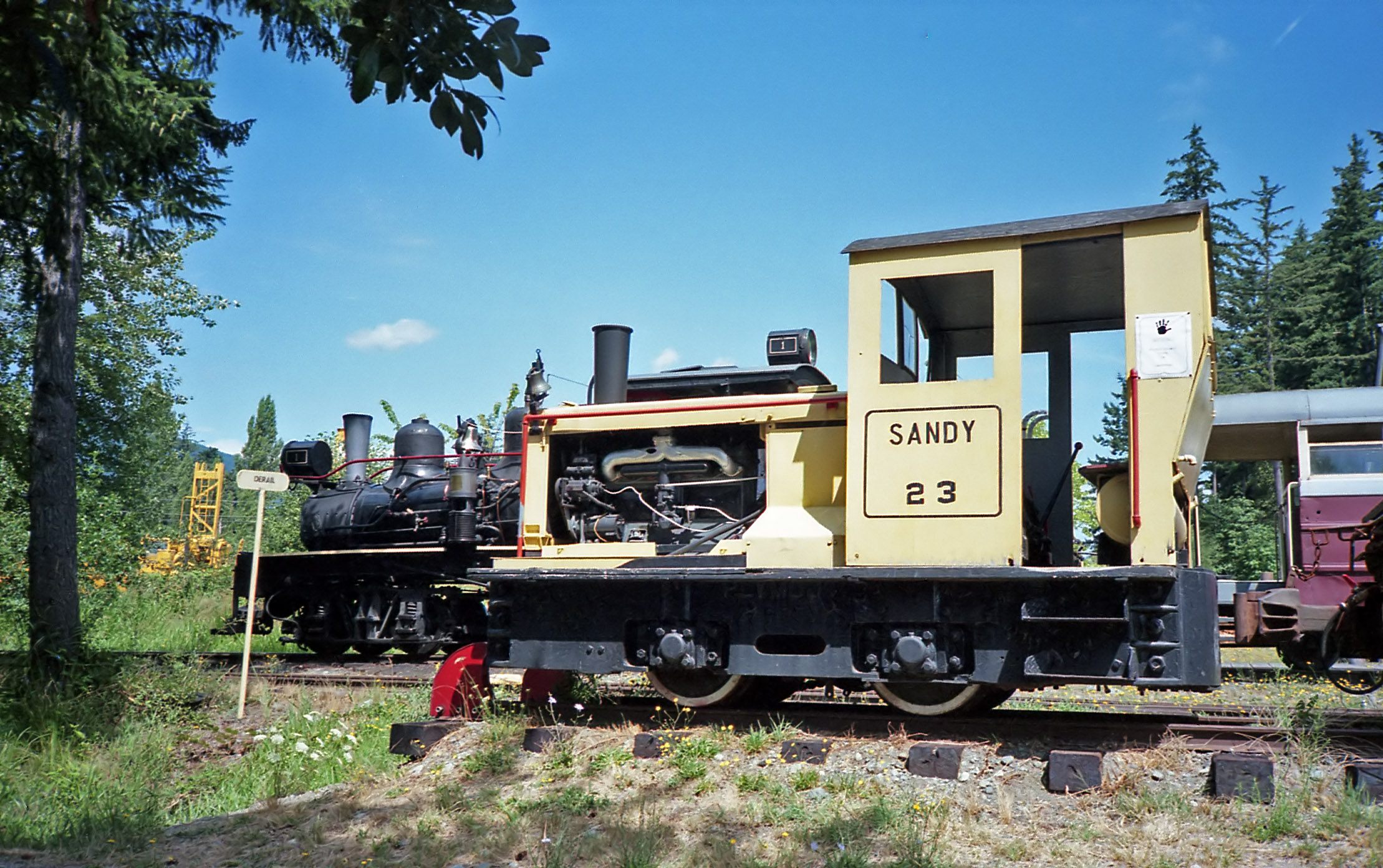
Cowichan Valley Railway No. 23 "Sandy"

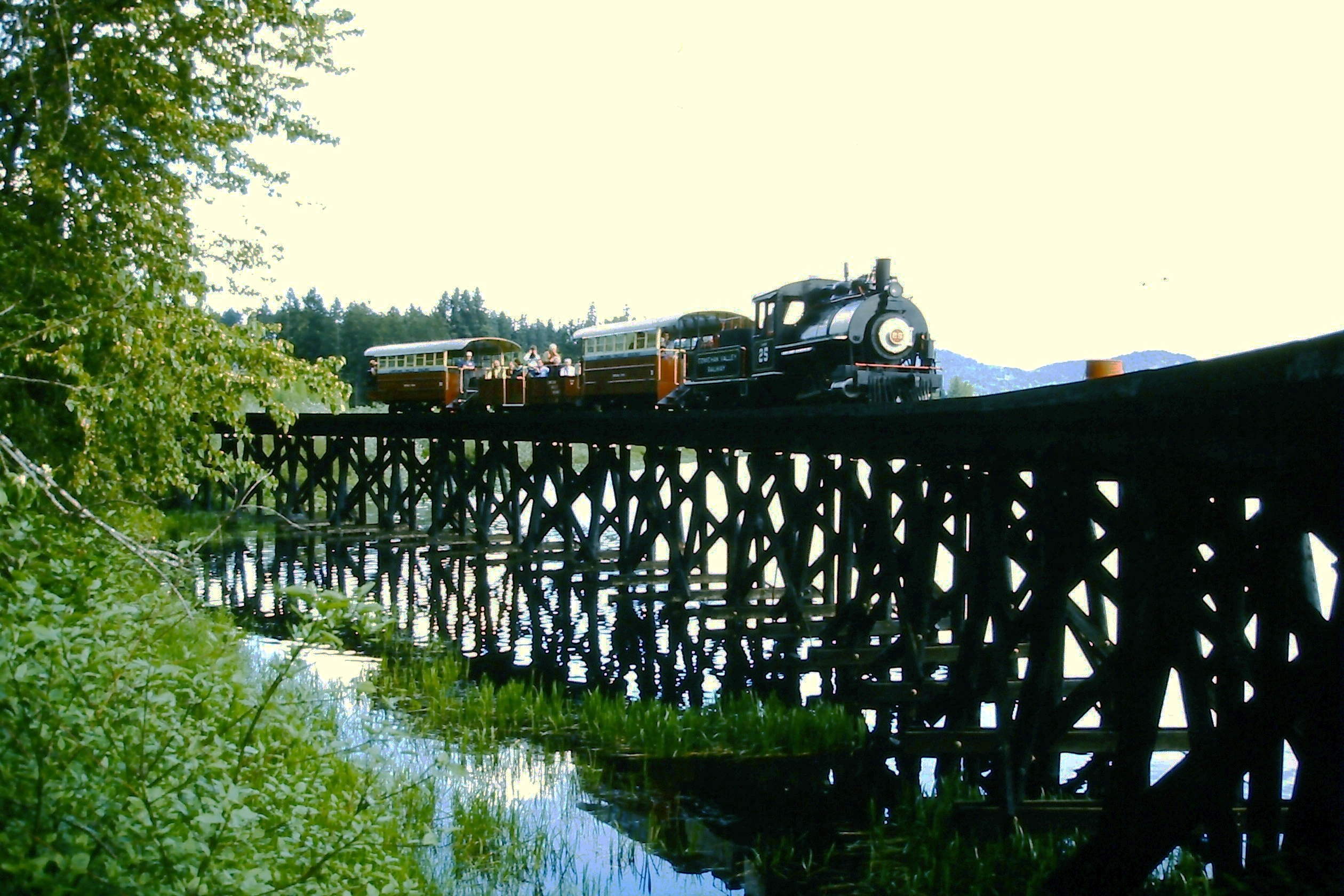
Cowichan Valley Railway No. 25 "Samson"

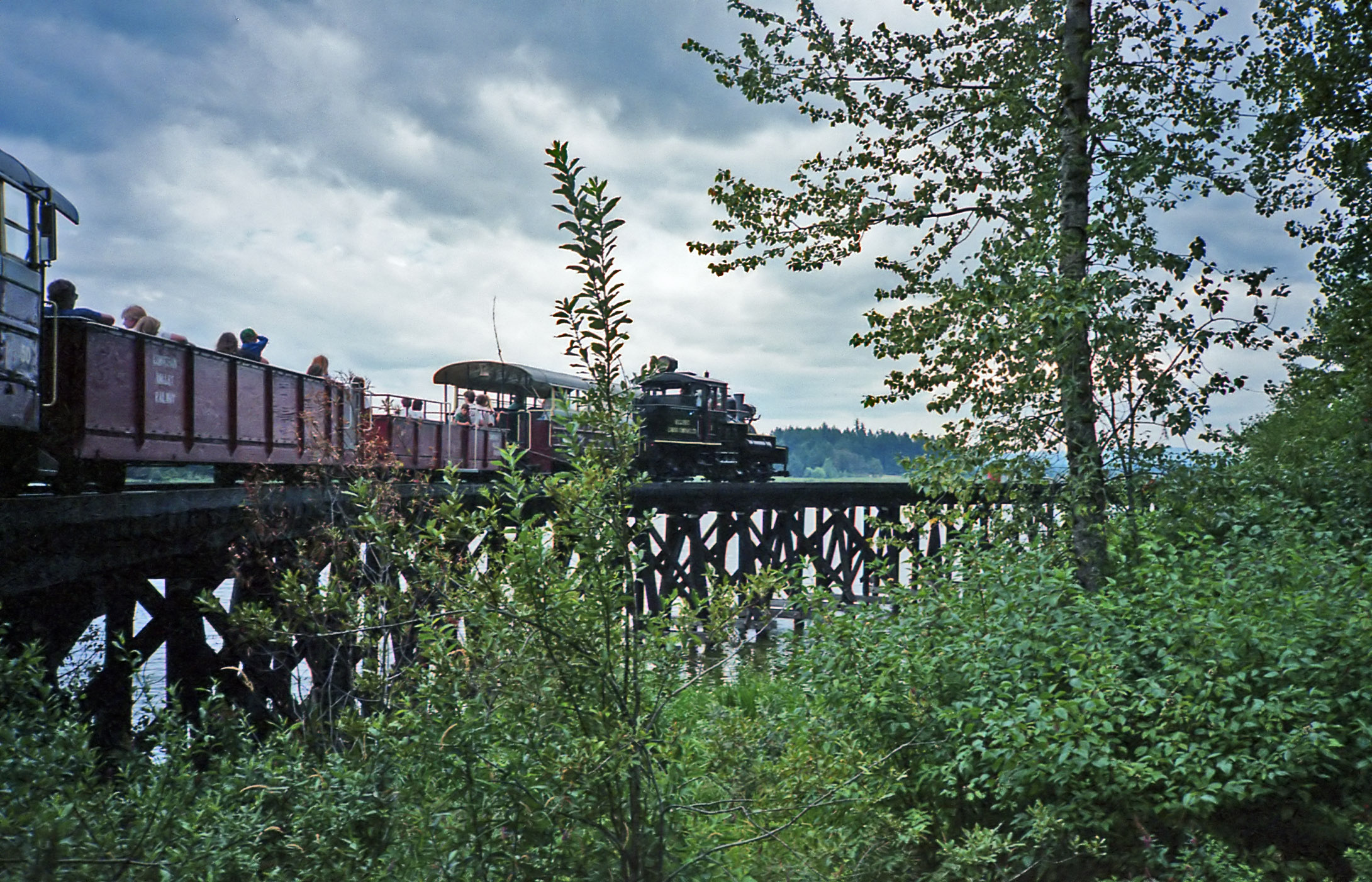
HLC No. 1 Shay over Somenos Lake trestle

== Site ==
The site has a reconstructed fire watch tower, which offers a commanding view of the site and nearby Somenos Marsh.

The Centre borders the Somenos Marsh Wildlife Refuge and Ducks Unlimited pond. Many types of water fowl and other birds can be found in this area. Red-eared slider turtles can be found sunning in the field next to the marsh.

== See also ==
- List of heritage railways in Canada
- List of museums in Canada
