= Canadian Pacific 3716 =

Preserved N-2-b class 2-8-0 locomotive

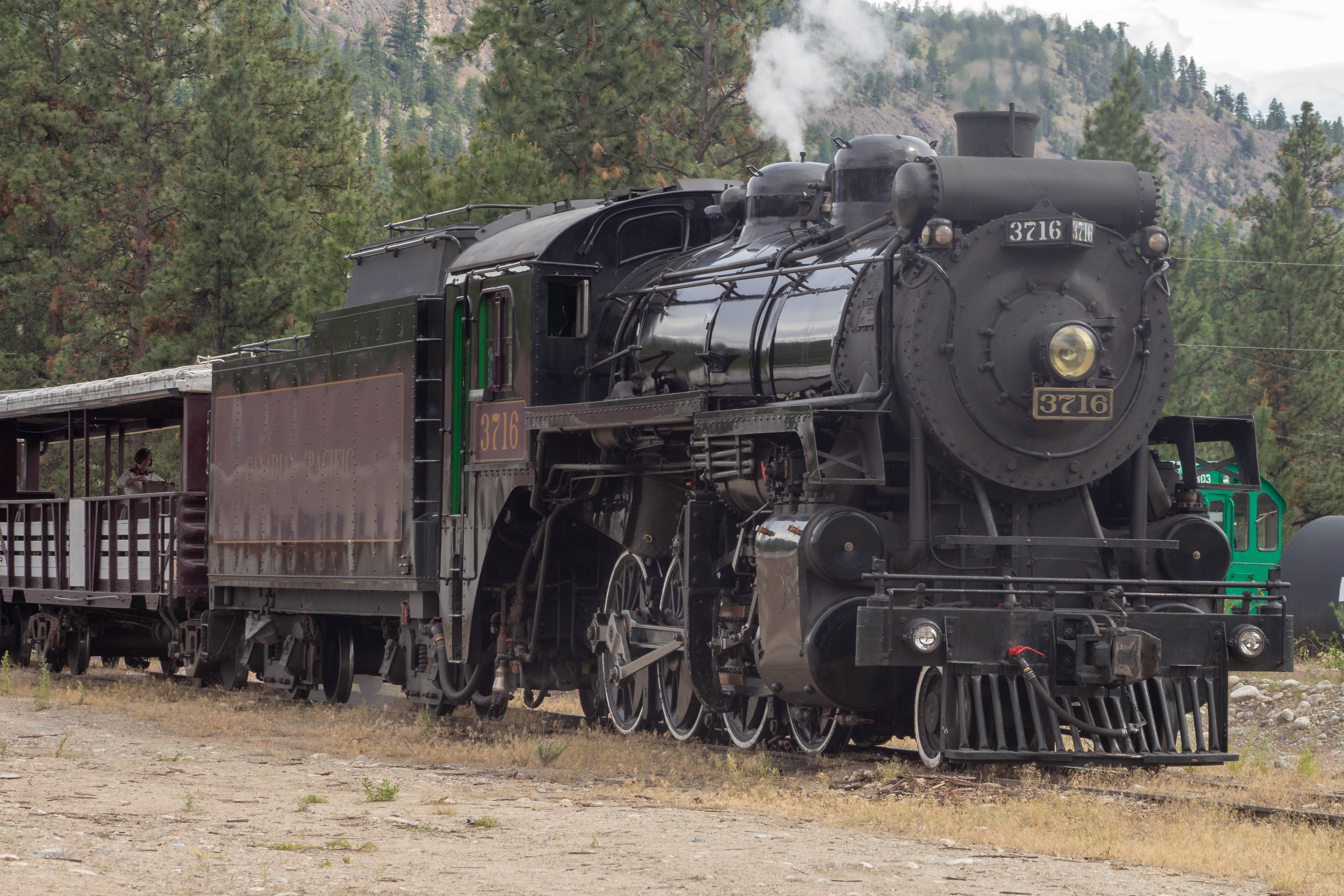
- No. 3716 with an excursion train, June 11, 2007
Type and origin
- Power type: Steam
- Builder: Montreal Locomotive Works
- Serial number: 51628
- Build date: November 1912
- Rebuild date: 1929
Specifications
- Configuration
  - Whyte: 2-8-0
  - UIC: 1′D
- Gauge: 1,435 mm (4 ft 8 1/2 in)
- Leading dia.: 36 in (0.91 m)
- Driver dia.: 63 in (1.60 m)
- Length: 75 ft 5 1/2 in (23.00 m)
- Height: 15 ft 3 in (4.65 m)
- Adhesive weight: 211,000 lb (96 t)
- Loco weight: 236,000 lb (107 t)
- Tender weight: 139,000 lb (63 t)
- Fuel type: New: Coal; Now: Oil
- Fuel capacity: 12 short tons (11 t) coal
- Water cap.: 5,000 imp gal (23 m^{3}) water
- Boiler pressure: 190 lbf/in^{2} (1.3 MPa)
- Cylinders: Two, outside
- Cylinder size: 23 in × 32 in (580 mm × 810 mm)
- Valve gear: Walschaerts
- Valve type: Piston valves
- Train heating: Steam heat
- Loco brake: Air
- Train brakes: Air
- Couplers: Knuckle
Performance figures
- Tractive effort: 43% 43,400 lbf (193 kN)
Career
- Operators: Canadian Pacific Railway; British Columbia Railway; Kettle Valley Steam Railway
- Class: N-2-b
- Numbers: CPR 3916; CPR 3716
- Nicknames: Port Coquitlam; Spirit of Summerland
- Retired: 1960
- Preserved: April 1966
- Restored: June 10, 1975
- Current owner: Kettle Valley Steam Railway
- Disposition: Operational

Canadian Pacific 3716 is a preserved N-2-b class 2-8-0 "Consolidation" type steam locomotive, built by the Montreal Locomotive Works (MLW) for the Canadian Pacific Railway (CPR). It is currently owned and operated by the Kettle Valley Steam Railway (KVSR) in British Columbia.

After operating for over 30 years, it was retired in 1960 and kept in storage until it was acquired by the Government of British Columbia to be restored. No. 3716 began operating under BC Rail in 1975, and ran excursions for the British Columbia Provincial Museum Train. It also assisted Canadian Pacific 2860 with The Royal Hudson excursion train, which ran from 1974 to 2001.

In 2003, No. 3716 was purchased by the KVSR in Summerland and began pulling excursions in 2005.

== History ==
=== Revenue service ===
The locomotive was originally built as No. 3916 by the Montreal Locomotive Works (MLW) in November 1912 for the Canadian Pacific Railway (CPR) as an N-2-b class locomotive. It was renumbered to No. 3716 in 1929, when it was converted from burning coal to oil.

No. 3716 was retired from revenue service in 1960, later being purchased by the City of Port Coquitlam in April 1966 for a planned display, also being nicknamed Port Coquitlam at this time. The display never materialized, and the engine was stored at the Drake Street Yards in Vancouver until 1970, when it was purchased by the Government of British Columbia with plans made for an extensive rebuild to run it in excursions for BC Rail. The Government of British Columbia were in need of a steam locomotive to haul its Provincial Museum Train, and, as the restoration of Canadian Pacific No. 2860 was completed, the Drake Street crew were able to undertake the assignment.

=== BC Rail career ===
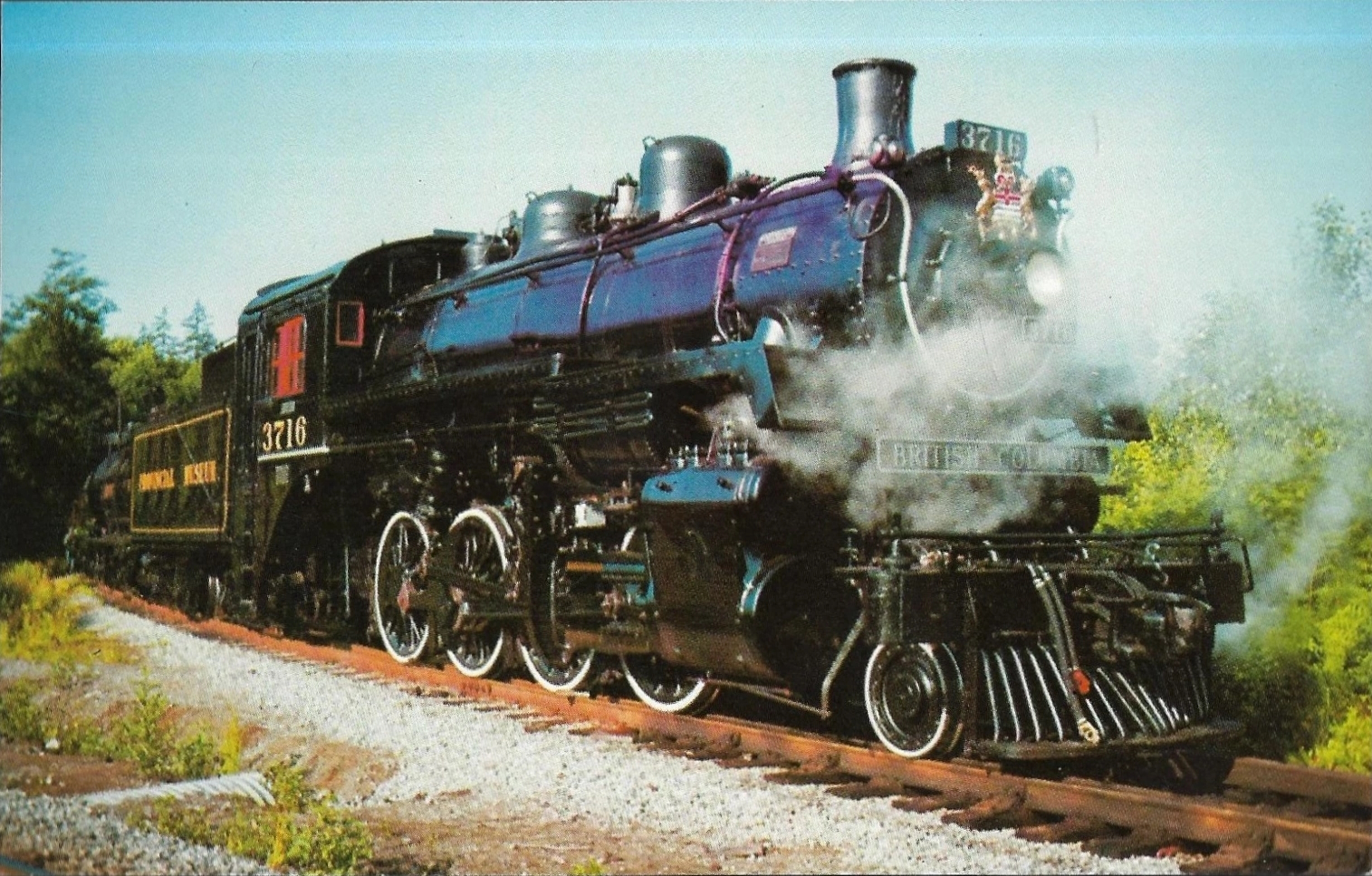
No. 3716, adorned with regal features, hauling the Provincial Museum Train in the 1970s.

The locomotive made its first test run on June 10, 1975, running from Vancouver to Coquitlam. The following month, the engine ran a special eight-car excursion train on Vancouver Island; however, it was too heavy to cross any of the bridges and was replaced by MacMillan Bloedel & Powell River Ltd. 1077 for the rest of the excursion.

No. 3716 then toured British Columbia in July and August pulling an eight-car train, once again travelling across the province in 1977 and 1978. Operated by the British Columbia Railway (BCOL), the locomotive primarily served as a backup locomotive to No. 2860, which hauled The Royal Hudson train from North Vancouver to Squamish. The two also frequently doubleheaded trains for special occasions or events, such as the ten-day Steam Exposition event as part of Expo 86 and the 1988 "Great Canadian Steam Railway Excursion".

The BC Rail Steam Program was shut down in April 2001, after passenger service on the railway ceased, and No. 3716 was withdrawn from service after it suffered some major firebox damage during an excursion run.

=== Kettle Valley Steam Railway ===
In 2003, it was purchased by the Kettle Valley Steam Railway (KVS), a heritage railway in Summerland. The locomotive was repaired and hauled its inaugural run on May 22, 2005, being nicknamed the Spirit of Summerland. In October 2012, the engine celebrated its 100th birthday. As of 2026, the locomotive continues to haul excursions for the railway.

== Appearances in media ==
- In 1982, the locomotive appeared in The Grey Fox by Phillip Borsos.
- In 1985, the locomotive appeared in The Journey of Natty Gann by Jeremy Kagun.
- In 2010 and 2011, the locomotive was featured in multiple songs and on the covers of Fountainview Academy's Christmas DVDs Joy to the World and O Come All Ye Faithful.

== See also ==
- Canadian Pacific 2860
- Canadian National 6060
- Canadian Pacific Railway § Steam locomotives
- Kettle Valley Steam Railway

== Bibliography ==
- Trainer, Mary (October 23, 2015). Whistle Posts West (1st ed.). Heritage House. p. 129, 131. ISBN 978-1-7720-3044-0.
- Cline, Teresa. Hidden History. Lulu.com. p. 14. ISBN 978-1-3654-9491-8.
