= Minneola =

Minneola may refer to:

- a variety of tangelo

== Places in the United States ==
- Minneola, former name of Alleene, Arkansas
- Minneola, Florida
- Minneola, Clark County, Kansas
- Minneola, Franklin County, Kansas
- Minneola Township, Goodhue County, Minnesota

== See also ==
- Mineola (disambiguation)
