= Robert Dirk =

Canadian ice hockey player (b. 1966)

- Born: August 20, 1966 (age 59) Regina, Saskatchewan, Canada
- Height: 6 ft 4 in (193 cm)
- Weight: 207 lb (94 kg; 14 st 11 lb)
- Position: Defence
- Shot: Left
- Played for: St. Louis Blues; Vancouver Canucks; Chicago Blackhawks; Mighty Ducks of Anaheim; Montreal Canadiens
- NHL draft: 53rd overall, 1984; St. Louis Blues
- Playing career: 1986–1997

Robert Michael Dirk (born August 20, 1966) is a Canadian former professional ice hockey player. Dirk played in the National Hockey League between 1987 and 1996.

== Playing career ==
Dirk was born in Regina, Saskatchewan. He was selected 54th overall in the 1984 NHL entry draft by the St. Louis Blues. He would turn pro in 1986 and spend the next five seasons bouncing between the NHL club and the Peoria Rivermen, the Blues IHL affiliate. He would finally stick on the Blues roster full-time in 1990–91, appearing in 41 games before being moved to the Vancouver Canucks in a 6-player deal at the trade deadline.

Dirk would find a home on an up-and-coming Vancouver team. While his skating and skill level were limited, he was a big, bruising defensive defender well thought of for his heart and grit. He appeared in a career-high 72 games in 1991–92, recording 2 goals and 9 points along with 126 penalty minutes. In 1992–93, he set career bests with 12 points and 150 penalty minutes in 69 games. He spent his third full season with the Canucks in 1993–94, but the acquisition of Jeff Brown and Bret Hedican in a deal with St. Louis left Vancouver with too many bodies on defence, and he was dispatched to the Chicago Blackhawks for a draft pick at the trade deadline.

After only 6 games for Chicago, Dirk was moved again, this time to the Mighty Ducks of Anaheim, for the 1994–95 campaign. After a season and a half with the Ducks, he was dealt to the Montreal Canadiens in 1996. However, he would fracture his shoulder in his debut for Montreal and was never able to establish himself, appearing in only 3 games for the team.

Released by the Habs following the 1995–96 season, Dirk spent a year in the IHL before retiring and moving into coaching. He finished his career with 13 goals and 29 assists for 42 points in 402 career games, along with 786 penalty minutes.

== Coaching career ==
On his retirement as a player in 1997, Dirk accepted a head coaching job in the UHL with the Winston-Salem Icehawks. He would spend three seasons in the UHL, one in Winston-Salem before joining the Saginaw Gears for two more years. He spent the 2000–2002 seasons with the WCHL Tacoma Sabercats, before being hired as the first head coach of the Texas Wildcatters of the ECHL.

Following his release from the Wildcatters in 2005, Dirk remained in Beaumont, Texas to take a job as the director of the Montagne Center, the home venue of the athletic squads for Lamar University. He then traveled to and from Houston, Texas to coach his son's bantam AA team. He was the coach for the Penticton Lakers Junior B team in the KIJHL, but later moved on to coach various teams at the Okanagan Hockey Academy for players 14-18.

On April 22, 2026, the Summerland Jets announced that Dirk would serve as the team's first ever head coach.

== Career statistics ==
			Regular season					Playoffs
Season	Team	League	GP	G	A	Pts	PIM	GP	G	A	Pts	PIM
1982–83	Notre Dame Hounds	SMHL	23	1	6	7	8	—	—	—	—	—
1982–83	Kelowna Buckaroos	BCJHL	27	3	10	13	43	13	5	16	21	34
1982–83	Regina Pats	WHL	1	0	0	0	0	—	—	—	—	—
1983–84	Regina Pats	WHL	62	2	10	12	64	23	1	12	13	24
1984–85	Regina Pats	WHL	69	10	34	44	97	8	0	0	0	4
1985–86	Regina Pats	WHL	72	19	60	79	140	10	3	5	8	8
1986–87	Peoria Rivermen	IHL	76	5	17	22	155	—	—	—	—	—
1987–88	Peoria Rivermen	IHL	54	4	21	25	126	—	—	—	—	—
1987–88	St. Louis Blues	NHL	7	0	1	1	16	6	0	1	1	2
1988–89	Peoria Rivermen	IHL	22	0	2	2	54	—	—	—	—	—
1988–89	St. Louis Blues	NHL	9	0	1	1	11	—	—	—	—	—
1989–90	St. Louis Blues	NHL	37	1	1	2	128	3	0	0	0	0
1989–90	Peoria Rivermen	IHL	24	1	2	3	79	—	—	—	—	—
1990–91	St. Louis Blues	NHL	41	1	3	4	100	—	—	—	—	—
1990–91	Peoria Rivermen	IHL	3	0	0	0	2	—	—	—	—	—
1990–91	Vancouver Canucks	NHL	11	1	0	1	20	6	0	0	0	13
1991–92	Vancouver Canucks	NHL	72	2	7	9	126	13	0	0	0	20
1992–93	Vancouver Canucks	NHL	69	4	8	12	150	9	0	0	0	6
1993–94	Vancouver Canucks	NHL	65	2	3	5	105	—	—	—	—	—
1993–94	Chicago Blackhawks	NHL	6	0	0	0	26	2	0	0	0	15
1994–95	Mighty Ducks of Anaheim	NHL	38	1	3	4	42	—	—	—	—	—
1995–96	Mighty Ducks of Anaheim	NHL	44	1	2	3	42	—	—	—	—	—
1995–96	Montreal Canadiens	NHL	3	0	0	0	6	—	—	—	—	—
1996–97	Detroit Vipers	IHL	48	2	8	10	36	—	—	—	—	—
1996–97	Chicago Wolves	IHL	31	1	5	6	26	3	0	0	0	0
NHL totals			402	13	29	42	772	39	0	1	1	56

== Awards ==
- WHL East Second All-Star Team – 1986
