= A. R. Rahman Jai Ho Concert: The Journey Home World Tour =

2010 concert tour by A. R. Rahman

- Tour by A. R. Rahman
- Start date: June 11, 2010
- End date: November 26, 2010
- No. of shows: 20

A. R. Rahman Jai Ho Concert: The Journey Home World Tour is the first world tour by Indian musician A. R. Rahman. Rahman organised the tour in 2010, following the success of his soundtrack album Slumdog Millionaire, and particularly the song "Jai Ho". The tour was kicked off on June 11 at the Nassau Coliseum in New York and was initially decided to span 16 major cities worldwide. Amy Tinkham is the choreographer and director of the tour, John Beasley, Music Director, and Deepak Gattani of Rapport Productions produces it. The tour features 23 playback singers from India, along with several instrumentalists and dancers.

The tour was highly successful, with tickets of many of the concerts being sold out several days before the respective event. The Detroit concert was originally planned on 19 June but was postponed when the stage at Pontiac Silverdome collapsed. No injuries were reported, but the concerts had to be rescheduled and the U. S. concerts were resumed only in September.

== Tour dates ==
| Date | City | Country | Venue |
|---|---|---|---|
| June 11, 2010 | Uninodale | United States | Nassau Coliseum |
| June 12, 2010 | Atlantic City | United States | Boardwalk Hall Arena |
| June 13, 2010 | Fairfax | United States | Patriot Center |
| June 18, 2010 | Chicago | United States | Sears Center Arena |
| July 23, 2010 | Birmingham | England | LG Arena |
| July 24, 2010 | London | England | The O2 Arena |
| July 25, 2010 | London | England | Wembley Arena |
| September 11, 2010 | Inglewood | United States | L.A. Forum |
| September 12, 2010 | Oakland | United States | Oracle Arena |
| September 14, 2010 | Vancouver | Canada | PNE Colesium |
| September 17, 2010 | Houston | United States | Houston Toyota Center |
| September 18, 2010 | Dallas | United States | American Airlines Center |
| September 22, 2010 | Worcester | United States | DCU Center |
| September 23, 2010 | Newark | United States | Prudential Center |
| September 25, 2010 | Pontiac | United States | Pontiac Silverdome |
| September 26, 2010 | Toronto | Canada | Air Canada Centre |
| September 29, 2010 | Raleigh | United States | RBC Center |
| November 20, 2010 | Johannesburg | South Africa | The Sun City Super Bowl |
| November 24, 2010 | Cape Town | South Africa | The Grand Arena, Grand West |
| November 26, 2010 | Durban | South Africa | Moses Mabhida Stadium |
