= Summerland Secondary School =

Location
- 9518 Main Street; Summerland, British Columbia, V0H 1Z0; Canada; 49.60187°N 119.67934°W

Information
- School type: Public, high school
- School board: School District 67 Okanagan Skaha
- Principal: Trevor Robinson
- Staff: 58
- Grades: 8-12
- Enrollment: 524 (2024)
- Language: English
- Colours: Blue, White and Orange
- Team name: Rockets
- Website: summerlandsecondary.sd67.bc.ca

Summerland Secondary School (or SSS) is a public secondary school in Summerland, British Columbia, Canada. It is operated by School District 67 Okanagan Skaha. It is the only secondary school in Summerland and one of three in the school district. The school is fed from Summerland Middle School and two elementary schools. The school also hosts a French Immersion program for all grades.

== Academic & special programs ==
In addition to a full range of standard academic courses, the school also offers:

- FDTV
- Computer Animation.
- Alternate program
- French Immersion Program (one class for each grade)
- Adult Learning Centre
- Hockey Skills Academy
- Bridge Program

== Career and vocation education ==
"C.A.V.E." programs include:

- Career Preparation
- Work Experience
- Secondary School Apprenticeship
- Career Transition Program (CTP), a dual-credit program with one-year Entry Level Training in trades at Okanagan College's campus in Kelowna.
- Accelerated Credit Enrollment in Industry Training (ACE IT), offering programs in partnership with Okanagan College in the fields of Horticulture, Joinery, Residential Construction, and Culinary Arts.

== History and facilities ==
SSS was formerly known as Summerland High School. A high school was founded in Summerland as early as 1909. Renovations to the entry and office area were undertaken in 2008.
