= Naveen Kumar (musician) =

Indian musician

P.M.K. Naveen Kumar
- Born: P.M.K. Naveen Kumar
- Genres: Bollywood, Instrumental
- Occupation: Composer
- Instrument: Flute
- Years active: 1983–present
- Label: Folktronic (Sony Music Independent)
- Website: www.naveenflute.com

Naveen Kumar is an Indian flautist who has accompanied many film music directors and composers on popular Bollywood tracks. Naveen has also directed music for Gospel recordings. He is known for playing flute in Bombay themes and Kal Ho na Ho

== Musical career ==
Naveen has played for leading Indian film music composers such as A.R. Rahman, Ilayaraja, Pritam, Shankar–Ehsaan–Loy, Sajid–Wajid and Salim–Sulaiman. He has performed with musicians such as Sivamani, Louiz Banks, Mandolin Srinivas, and John McLaughlin. Eventually, Naveen moved to Mumbai to work with other composers in India. He has featured vocals in film songs by M.M. Keeravani and Deva, among others. Songs include "Kaadhal Sadugudu" in Mani Ratnam's Alai Payuthey, and "Salam Gulamu" in Deva's Hello.

He created his own flute, which he calls the "Naveen Flute". This flute features flute tone and the vibration of strings (through the placement of a string on the side of the flute).

Naveen has received great attention for the instrumental orchestral piece, "Bombay Theme", which AR Rahman composed and arranged for the film Bombay in 1995. Other popular songs that feature his flute interludes are Zara Zara (Rehna Hai Tere Dil Mein) and the Kal Ho Na Ho title track. He also performed with A.R. Rahman and the Royal Philharmonic Orchestra at the Southbank Centre in London on 7 April 2010.

== Private albums ==
Year	Album	Record label
2015	Silence Is Bliss	Sony Music
2013	Flutetronics	Sony Music
2011	Melodies of Love	Sony Music
2010	Café Fluid	Sony Music
2009	Celebration 2010 (with Jyothi Kumar)	P.M.K. Naveen Kumar
2006	Fluid	Sony Music
2006	Never Say Goodbye	Sony Music

== Films ==
- Chhaava (2025)
- Dil Bechara (2020)
- Kabhi Alvida Na Kehna (2006)
- Raavan (2010)
- Jab We Met (2007)
- Kisna (2005)
- Dhoom (2004)
- Kal Ho Naa Ho (2003)
- Warriors of Heaven and Earth (2003)
- Rehna Hai Tere Dil Mein (2001)
- Taal (1999)
- Dil Se.. (1998)
- Bombay (1995)
- Roja (1992).
