= Mineola, British Columbia =

Mineola
- Location of Mineola in British Columbia
- Coordinates: 49°37′30″N 119°47′00″W
- Country: Canada
- Province: British Columbia

Mineola is a ghost town located in the Okanagan region of British Columbia. It was located west of Okanagan Lake in the Okanagan hills, north of the junction of Trout and Darke Creeks, northwest of Summerland. Mineola was a lumber town. The town had its own post office and was busy for over a decade.
