= Penticton Secondary School =

Location
- 158 Eckhardt Avenue E. Penticton, British Columbia, V2A 1Z3; Canada; 49.49178°N 119.58731°W

Information
- School type: Public, high school
- Motto: Excellence through action
- Founded: 1913
- School board: School District 67 Okanagan Skaha
- Grades: 8-12
- Enrollment: 1,300 (approx.) (2008)
- Language: English
- Campus: Urban
- Colour: Purple Gold
- Team name: Lakers
- Website: pentictonsecondary.sd67.bc.ca

Penticton Secondary School (Pen High or PSS) is a high school located in Penticton, British Columbia, Canada. PSS is operated by School District 67 Okanagan Skaha. It is one of two secondary schools in Penticton and one of three in the school district. It is located on the same campus as the Okanagan School of the Arts. The school district's French immersion classes for grades 8-12 are located at the school.

== Academic programs ==
In addition to standard core curriculum programs, Advanced Placement courses are offered which can be used for credit at universities and colleges. Other programs offered include:

- Applied Skills
- Athletics & PE
- Business
- Fine Arts
- Languages

=== Hockey Academy ===
The school is involved with the Okanagan Hockey School in a private-public partnership at the Okanagan Hockey Academy (OHA). Students traveling to Penticton to enroll in the OHA are eligible to take academic courses at PenHigh while PenHigh students receive hockey training and practice from the OHA. Students are also eligible to play on the OHA's competitive teams.

=== Music ===
The school's music program offers:

- Concert Band
- Senior Band
- Senior Jazz
- Concert Choir
- Guitar
- Recording Arts
- Musical Theatre

== History and facilities ==
Penticton High School opened on the current site in 1913 in the Ellis building, and in 1921 expanded into the new Shatford building, named after the recently deceased former Member of the Legislative Assembly in British Columbia and later Senator Lytton Shatford. Shatford's company had purchased the Ellis estate on whose land the school would be established. The buildings have also been known as the Ellis School and the Shatford School, respectively.

Numerous renovations and expansions occurred from the 1940s on. A new facility was constructed on the same campus during 2006–2008 at a capital cost of $38 million. The school district agreed to maintain the Ellis building, which was upgraded and incorporated into the new school at a cost of $3.1 million, and the city took responsibility for the Shatford building. The new building's design incorporated energy efficient strategies, including a geothermal heating system.

The Shatford Centre is one of two heritage buildings on the PSS campus. Its renovation was completed in 2011 and was funded by the school district, the local, provincial, and federal governments, and other public and private entities. The Shatford building has been renamed The Shatford Centre which operates as a conference centre and events facility, and houses the Okanagan School of the Arts.

The graduation of the class of 1975 was the topic of the short NFB documentary Pen-Hi Grad by Sandy Wilson.

== Notable alumni ==
- Mattias Clement, aka Tyler Breeze, Professional Wrestler
- Brett Hull, NHL hockey player
- Paul Kariya, retired NHL hockey player
- Duncan Keith, retired NHL hockey player
- Brendan Morrison, NHL hockey player
- Mike Reno, Musician
- Cole Sillinger, NHL hockey player
- Troy Stecher, NHL hockey player
- Sandy Wilson, film director
- Micah Zandee-Hart, PWHL hockey player
