= Mineola station =

Mineola station may refer to:

- Mineola station (Texas), an Amtrak station in Mineola, Texas
- Mineola station (LIRR), a Long Island Rail Road station in Mineola, New York
