= School District 67 Okanagan Skaha =

School district in British Columbia Province, Canada

Location
- Penticton Penticton, Summerland in Okanagan/Mainline Canada

District information
- Superintendent: Mr. Todd Manuel
- Schools: 20
- Budget: CA$52 million

Students and staff
- Students: 5500

Other information
- Website: www.sd67.bc.ca

School District 67 Okanagan Skaha is a school district in the Okanagan region of British Columbia. It operates the public schools in Penticton and Summerland.

== History ==
School District 67 was created by the merger of the Summerland and Penticton School Districts in 1996.

== Schools ==
School	Location	Grades
Carmi Elementary School	Penticton	K-5
Columbia Elementary School	Penticton	K-5
Giant's Head Elementary School	Summerland	K-5
Home Learners Program SD67	Penticton	K-12
Kaleden Elementary School	Kaleden	K-6
KVR Middle School	Penticton	6-8
Naramata Elementary School	Naramata	K-5
Parkway Elementary School	Penticton	K-5
Penticton Secondary School	Penticton	9-12
Princess Margaret Secondary School	Penticton	9-12
Queens Park Elementary School	Penticton	K-5
Skaha Lake Middle School	Penticton	6-8
Summerland Community Learning Centre	Summerland	SU
Summerland Middle School	Summerland	6-8
Summerland Secondary School	Summerland	9-12
Trout Creek Elementary School	Summerland	K-5
Uplands Elementary School	Penticton	K-5
West Bench Elementary School	Penticton	K-5
Wiltse Elementary School	Penticton	K-5

== See also ==
- List of school districts in British Columbia
