= Summerland Sting =

- City: Summerland, British Columbia
- League: Kootenay International Junior Hockey League
- Founded: 2001–02
- Home arena: Summerland Arena
- Colours: Yellow, Navy, White
- General manager: (Canada) Andy Oakes
- Head coach: (Canada) Rich Kromm

Franchise history
- 2001-2009: Summerland Sting
- 2009-2013: Penticton Lakers
- 2013-present: 100 Mile House Wranglers

The Summerland Sting was a Canadian 'B' Junior ice hockey team from Summerland, British Columbia. They played in the Kootenay International Junior Hockey League after joining during the 2001/02 season. The last season they played in was the 2008-09 KIJHL season. They relocated to Penticton, British Columbia, calling the new franchise the Penticton Lakers.

The Sting were affiliated with the Okanagan Hockey Academy from Penticton, British Columbia.

== History ==
The team never won any KIJHL silverware.

== Season-by-season record ==
Season	GP	W	L	T	OTL	GF	GA	P	Results	Playoffs
2001-02	50	30	16	4	0	205	182	64	3rd, Okanagan Shuswap	Lost in Division Semifinals, 0-4 (Grizzlies)
2002-03	50	28	16	2	4	187	169	62	2nd, Okanagan Shuswap	Lost in Division Finals, 0-4 (Eagles)
2003-04	50	32	14	3	1	210	166	68	3rd, Okanagan Shuswap	Lost in Division Semifinals, 0-4 (Eagles)
2004-05	50	29	18	1	4	224	175	61	4th Division	Lost in 1st round
2005-06	50	13	20	1	6	145	28	33	5th Division	DNQ
2006-07	52	28	20	-	0	205	194	60	2nd Division	Lost In 1st round
2007-08	52	26	21	-	5	165	172	57	3rd Division	Lost in 1st round
2008-09	52	18	28	-	6	146	184	42	6th Division	DNQ

DNQ denotes "Did not qualify"

== Notable alumni ==
- Justin Keller
- Justin Pogge

== See also ==
- List of ice hockey teams in British Columbia
- Summerland Steam
