= Bald Range fire =

2026 wildfire in Okanagan, Canada

- Date: August 7, 2026 – October 29, 2026
- Location: Summerland, British Columbia, Canada

Statistics
- Burned area: 25,163 hectares 97 square miles 252 square kilometres 62,179 acres
- Land use: Residential, Crown land, forestry

Impacts
- Deaths: 1
- Injuries: TBD
- Evacuated: 20,000+
- Structures destroyed: 150

Ignition
- Cause: Unknown

The Bald Range fire was a wildfire in Summerland, British Columbia in the Okanagan. It started on August 7, 2026 and became one of the most significant and fastest-growing wildfires of the year. As a result, evacuations were ordered for the entire community of Summerland (population 12,000) along with 8,000 people from the nearby Peachland area.

== Timeline ==
The fire started on Friday, August 7 about 15 kilometres (9.3 mi) north-west of Summerland. Three hours after it was noticed, it had burned an area of 5,000 hectares (50 km^{2}). By Monday, August 10, the fire had spread to 15,600 hectares (156 km^{2}). B.C. Wildfire Service staff described the fire conditions as "explosive". The spread of the fire was atypical, as instead of moving uphill, a strong wind from the west channelled the fire downhill, intensifying as it approached Okanagan Lake. The heated surface helped to speed up the wind, accelerating it from 20–30 kilometres per hour (12–19 mph) to 40–50 kilometres per hour (25–31 mph). Prolonged droughts in the area had created dry fuel.

By Saturday, August 8, the province had declared a state of emergency and ordered 20,000 residents in the Summerland and Peachland area to evacuate. Evacuees were advised to go to reception centres in West Kelowna and Penticton. An estimated 50,000 farm animals on 146 farms had to be left behind. Some animal handlers were allowed to stay in the evacuation zone to tend to the animals.

On Monday, August 10, Prime Minister Mark Carney put the Canadian military on standby to assist. On Tuesday, August 11, 100 firefighters from Mexico arrived. With the Mexicans, there were 193 firefighters assigned to the Bald Ridge fire with support from 14 helicopters and structure protection crews. Crews were challenged by heat, steep terrain and new fires starting beyond the perimeter of the main fire. Very dry conditions in the forest made fire ignition more likely.

By August 14, evacuation orders had been rescinded for Peachland and for 400 Trout Creek properties east of Highway 97. Returning residents were warned of downed trees, damaged buildings and roaming bears. By August 18, most of the evacuation orders for Summerland had been downgraded to evacuation alert, which meant that residents had to be prepared to leave again on short notice, if required. By August 21, the fire was still out of control, but was pushing westward away from Summerland and Okanagan Lake; however, the state of emergency remained in effect.

By August 28, the BC Wildfire Service reported the wildfire as being held after burning 25,185 hectares (62,230 acres). As that time, there were 379 wildland firefighters, 7 helicopters, 43 pieces of heavy equipment and 5 people assigned to structure protection. Rainy and cooler weather facilitated fire fighting; this was the first rain since the fire started on August 7.

It was finally declared extinguished on October 29, 2026.

== Aftermath ==
The fire devastated nearby Garnett Valley, Meadow Valley and Faulder. The fire had damaged or destroyed about 150 structures. In Faulder alone, only eight of its 81 homes were not destroyed. Many home-owners were uninsured or under-insured. Foreign farm workers had been sent home because of the fire, creating hardship for many local farmers. There were concerns about local water contamination. The fire caused the death of an 80-year-old woman who tried to evacuate.
