= Summerland, British Columbia =

Town in British Columbia, Canada

Summerland
- District municipality
- The Corporation of the District of Summerland
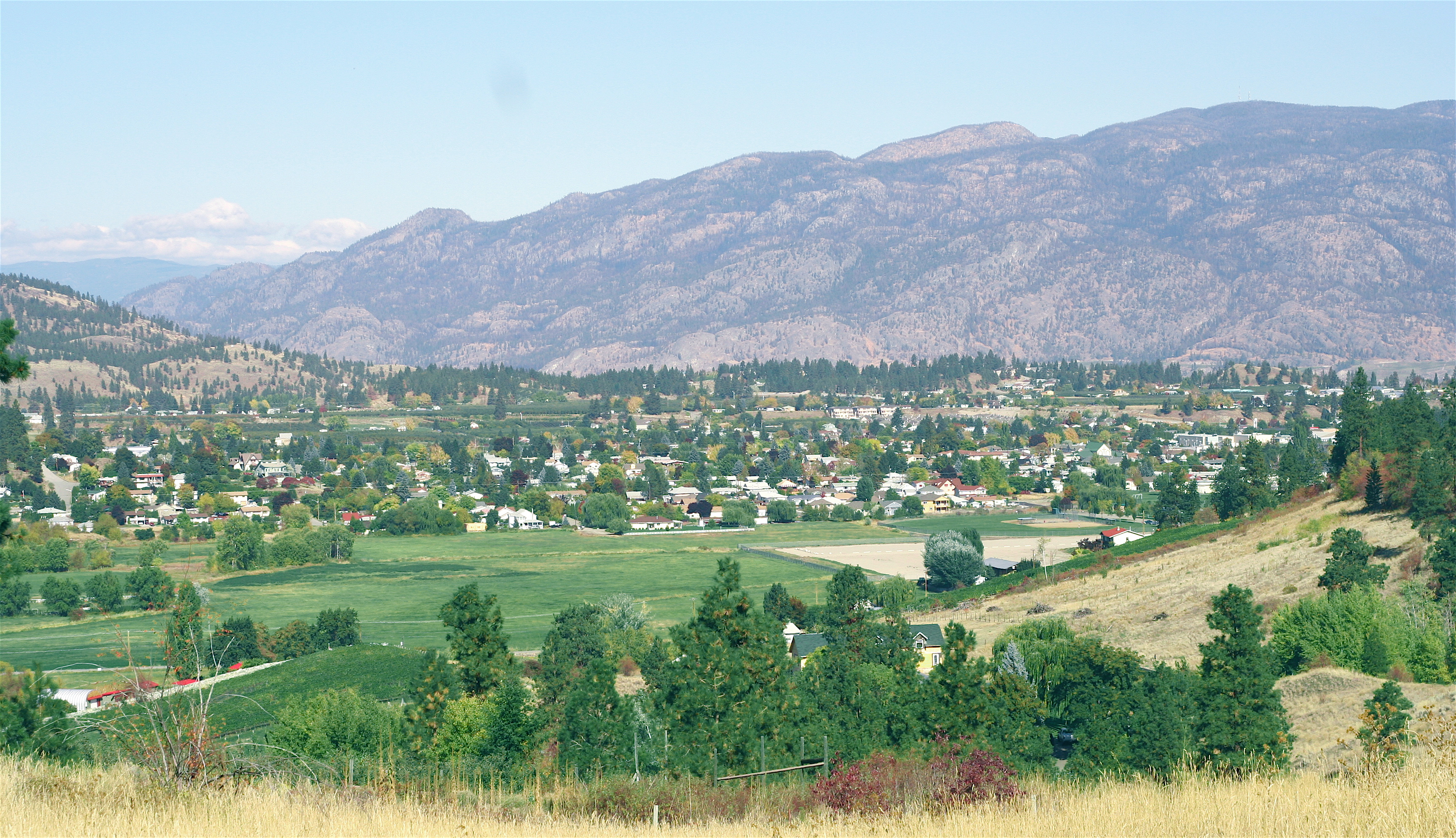
- View of Summerland in 2006

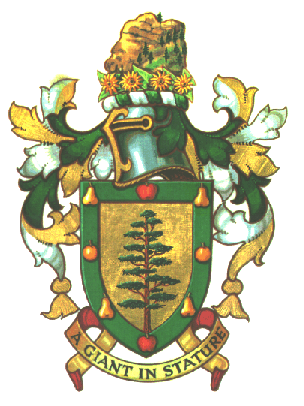
- Coat of arms
- Nickname: Town of Festivals
- Location of Summerland Summerland (Canada)
- Coordinates: 49°36′02″N 119°40′40″W
- Country: Canada
- Province: British Columbia
- Region: South Okanagan
- Regional District: Okanagan-Similkameen
- Founded: 1902

Government
  - Mayor: Doug Holmes
  - MLA: Amelia Boultbee

Area (2021)
  - Total: 74.04 km^{2} (28.59 sq mi)
  - Population Centre: 15.83 km^{2} (6.11 sq mi)
- Elevation: 454 m (1,490 ft)

Population (2021)
  - Total: 12,042
  - Density: 162.6/km^{2} (421/sq mi)
  - Population Centre: 9,860
  - Population Centre density: 623/km^{2} (1,610/sq mi)
- Postal code: V0H
- Area codes: 250, 778, 236 and 672
- Website: www.summerland.ca

Historical population
Year	Pop.	±%
1921	1,892	—
1931	1,791	−5.3%
1941	2,054	+14.7%
1951	3,567	+73.7%
1956	3,893	+9.1%
1961	4,307	+10.6%
1966	4,585	+6.5%
1971	5,551	+21.1%
1976	6,724	+21.1%
1981	7,473	+11.1%
1986	7,755	+3.8%
1991	9,253	+19.3%
1996	10,584	+14.4%
2001	10,713	+1.2%
2006	10,828	+1.1%
2011	11,280	+4.2%
2016	11,615	+3.0%
2021	12,042	+3.7%
Sources: Statistics Canada

Summerland is a district municipality on the west side of Okanagan Lake in the interior of British Columbia, Canada. The district is between Peachland to the north and Penticton to the south. The largest centre in the region is Kelowna, approximately 50 km (31 mi) to the north (via Highway 97), and Vancouver is approximately 425 km (264 mi) away to the west. The district is famous for "Bottleneck drive", a system of roads connecting various wineries.

== Electoral representatives ==
The current mayor is Doug Holmes. The district's Member of Parliament is Dan Albas of the Conservative Party of Canada. Its member of the Legislative Assembly of British Columbia is New Democratic Party of British Columbia member, Amelia Boultbee.

== History ==
In 2006, the District of Summerland celebrated its centennial as an incorporated municipality in 1906, yet the history of settlement in the Summerland area extends beyond that time. Summerland's first inhabitants were the Syilx (Okanagan Interior Salish), with the First Nations boundaries extending from Kamloops to southern Washington state. The area known as "Nicola Prairie" was notably named after the Grand Chief Nicola.

A published map of the Okanagan Valley in 1827 includes only three sites for the entire Okanagan Valley; Nicola Prairie; Lone Tree (north end of Summerland); and Sandy Cove (across the lake from present day Kelowna). Summerland's proud and diverse past includes hunting and fur trading, ranching, orchards and fruit industries, transportation hubs and more recently, tourism. Immigration to the Summerland area commenced in the late 1880s when the first settlers arrived and began diverting water to irrigate orchards. The first commercial orchard was planted in the 1890s in Trout Creek, where a water license was issued to irrigate 1,000 acres (4.0 km^{2}).

The first settlement identified on maps of the Okanagan Valley was Priest Encampment located on the shores of Garnett Lake. Later development began on the shores of Okanagan Lake. The upper benches continued to be an important transportation route and a number of small communities were constructed or were planned for development. They included Upper Trout Creek, Balcomo, the Prairie Valley Townsite, Mineola and Appledale. In 1892 Upper Trout Creek was established.

Summerland's former name was Trout Creek. In the 1890s George Barclay operated the largest cattle ranch in Trout Creek. In 1902, Sir Thomas Shaughnessy bought the Barclay Ranch and formed Summerland; incorporation was not completed until 1906. By the 1920s the present location of downtown Summerland was developed and the earlier areas on the upper benches were not utilized or forgotten. Downtown Summerland (Siwash Flat) was originally part of the Penticton Indian Reserve No. 3 (exchanged between 1904–06 following a mutually agreeable land deal). The subject lands eventually became known as West Summerland.

Present-day Lower Town was the original town site of Summerland. In the early 1900s the Summerland Development Company with Sir Thomas Shaughnessy (president) and J.M. Robinson (manager) primarily responsible for the initial decisions on its development. From the company, the community received water, septic tanks, electricity, a post office, a school and a sawmill. Settlers from across the prairies, eastern Canada and England were drawn to the Summerland area.

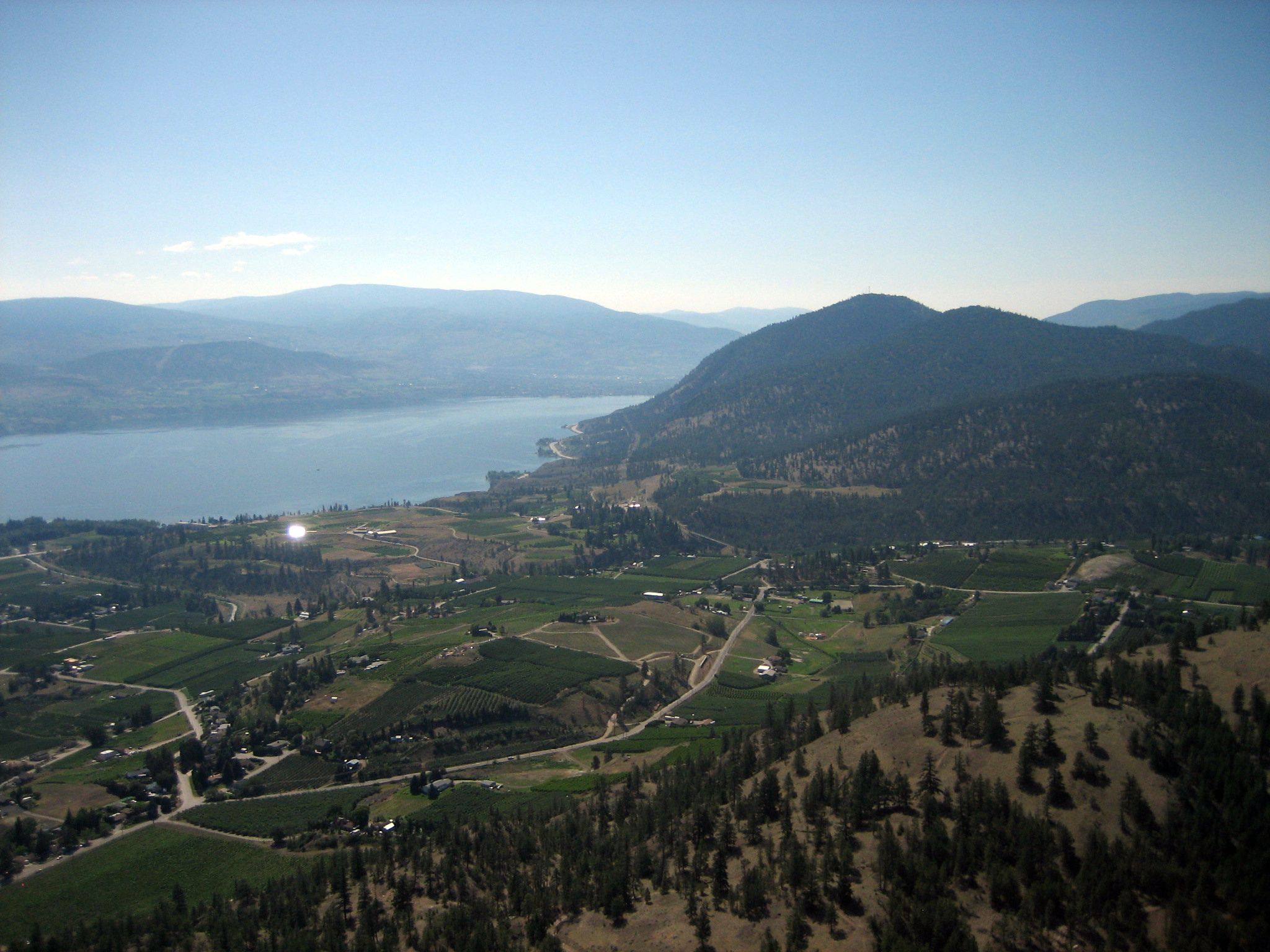
View from Giants Head south-east to Lake Okanagan

By 1907, Summerland had access to Peachland and Penticton with a well-established road system, and a ferry service connecting the community with the eastern shore of Okanagan Lake (Naramata). West Summerland (present day Downtown Summerland) experienced increased importance also in part due to a 1922 fire which destroyed many of the lakeside buildings in Lower Town.

On August 8, 2026, the entirety of Summerland and all residents within it were evacuated when the encroaching Bald Range fire threatened the town.

== Demographics ==
In the 2021 Census of Population conducted by Statistics Canada, Summerland had a population of 12,042 living in 5,084 of its 5,426 total private dwellings, a change of 3.7% from its 2016 population of 11,615. With a land area of 74.04 km^{2} (28.59 sq mi), it had a population density of 162.6/km^{2} (421.2/sq mi) in 2021.

=== Ethnicity ===
Panethnic groups in the Town of Summerland (1991−2021)
Panethnic group	2021		2016		2011		2006		2001		1996		1991	
Panethnic group	Pop.	%	Pop.	%	Pop.	%	Pop.	%	Pop.	%	Pop.	%	Pop.	%
European (Note: Statistic includes all persons that did not make up part of a visible minority or an indigenous identity.)	10,370	88.67%	10,055	90.63%	10,195	93.7%	10,025	93.82%	9,910	93.98%	10,015	96.07%	8,510	94.24%
Indigenous	625	5.34%	605	5.45%	380	3.49%	290	2.71%	255	2.42%	70	0.67%	270	2.99%
South Asian	235	2.01%	170	1.53%	65	0.6%	145	1.36%	95	0.9%	125	1.2%	50	0.55%
East Asian (Note: Statistic includes total responses of "Chinese", "Korean", and "Japanese" under visible minority section on census.)	225	1.92%	125	1.13%	130	1.19%	150	1.4%	235	2.23%	130	1.25%	130	1.44%
Southeast Asian (Note: Statistic includes total responses of "Filipino" and "Southeast Asian" under visible minority section on census.)	75	0.64%	60	0.54%	20	0.18%	10	0.09%	25	0.24%	25	0.24%	25	0.28%
African	65	0.56%	25	0.23%	45	0.41%	45	0.42%	25	0.24%	30	0.29%	0	0%
Latin American	40	0.34%	40	0.36%	25	0.23%	10	0.09%	10	0.09%	0	0%	10	0.11%
Middle Eastern (Note: Statistic includes total responses of "West Asian" and "Arab" under visible minority section on census.)	15	0.13%	10	0.09%	0	0%	10	0.09%	10	0.09%	20	0.19%	35	0.39%
Other/multiracial (Note: Statistic includes total responses of "Visible minority, n.i.e." and "Multiple visible minorities" under visible minority section on census.)	40	0.34%	10	0.09%	0	0%	10	0.09%	0	0%	10	0.1%	—N/a	—N/a
Total responses	11,695	97.12%	11,095	95.52%	10,880	96.45%	10,685	98.68%	10,545	98.34%	10,425	98.5%	9,030	97.59%
Total population	12,042	100%	11,615	100%	11,280	100%	10,828	100%	10,723	100%	10,584	100%	9,253	100%
Note: Totals greater than 100% due to multiple origin responses.

=== Religion ===
According to the 2021 census, religious groups in Summerland included:

- Irreligion (6,680 persons or 57.1%)
- Christianity (4,760 persons or 40.7%)
- Sikhism (125 persons or 1.1%)
- Buddhism (40 persons or 0.3%)
- Hinduism (40 persons or 0.3%)
- Judaism (10 persons or 0.1%)
- Other (50 persons or 0.4%)

== Education ==
Summerland's public school system is operated by School District 67 Okanagan Skaha which operates two elementary schools (Giants Head and Trout Creek), one middle school (Summerland Middle), and one secondary school Summerland Secondary School. Summerland has two private schools (a Montessori school) and Unisus, a day and full-time boarding school with students from the local Okanagan area and from countries around the world.

== Tourism ==
Summerland is popular because of its situation on Okanagan Lake and sandy beaches, a destination for three major Canadian population centres (Vancouver, Calgary, Edmonton). Both tourism and tourist attractions are a significant industry. Agriculture, featuring fresh tree fruits (peaches, cherries, apricots, apples and pears), and canneries, were the economic engine of the region until the late 20th century. Stone fruit and apples are now produced mainly for the fresh market (local and export). Over the past 20 years, Summerland has become home to several world-renowned wineries, and despite being in a semi-arid climate, has several golf courses. Summerland is also home to the historic Kettle Valley Steam Railway. The railway takes tourists on a trip around the Dale Meadows region of Summerland and further, eventually ending at the famous Trout Creek Trestle. Tourism Summerland guides visitors to Summerland attractions and events.

== Wine ==
Summerland is home to one of Canada's largest wine industries. Many of Summerland's wineries are connected by the famed 'Bottleneck Drive.'

== Sport ==
The Summerland Arena opened in 1976 and has been home to a number of junior hockey teams in the city. The Summerland Jets will play in the Junior A British Columbia Hockey Conference starting in the 2026–27 season. The Summerland Arena is formerly the home of the Summerland Steam of the Kootenay International Junior Hockey League, which relocated to Williams Lake in 2024. The arena also used to be the home of the Summerland Sting (2001–2009), and the Summerland Warriors (1999–2000), both of whom played in the same league. Previously the Summerland Buckaroos played in the British Columbia Hockey League from 1983–1988. Summerland is also home to the Summerland Minor Hockey Association (SMHA) known as the Summerland Jets. Football Club (FC) Detonate, founded in 2024, competes in the South Okanagan Men’s Soccer League (SOMSL).

== Geography ==
Summerland is located within the Thompson-Okanagan Plateau ecoregion. This is one of the warmest and driest ecoregions in Canada. It is characterized by rolling plateaus and major valley systems of the Okanagan, Thompson and Nicola Rivers. In the summer of 2003, a severe drought nearly rendered the town's reservoir incapable of ensuring a water supply through to the beginning of the next annual replenishment cycle. Since then, awareness of the real need for water conservation measures has begun to be taken seriously, and permanent water use restrictions are now in place.

The immediate ecosystem consists of grasslands in a matrix of bluebunch wheatgrass and sagebrush amongst scattered ponderosa pines. The region has a gently rolling surface covered mainly by glacial deposits. Summerland is home to an extinct volcano, known locally as Giant's Head Mountain – so-named for its gigantic facial profile as viewed from the southeast. This hill dominates the town's land features and provides an hour's hike to the top for an expansive view up and down the Okanagan Valley.

The range of representative wildlife around Summerland includes mule deer, Canada geese, California quail, ravens, coyotes, wolves, blue grouse, bald eagles, and black widow spiders. The hills surrounding Summerland is the natural habitat for black bear, white-tailed deer, moose, cougars and bobcats, California big-horn sheep, mountain goats, and rattlesnakes.

=== Climate ===
Summerland has a humid continental climate with hot, dry summers and cool winters. The mean annual temperature of the major valleys is approximately 10 °C (50 °F) with a summer mean of 21 °C (70 °F) and a winter mean of −3.5 °C (25.7 °F); however, winter months are often very temperate and cold weather usually lasts no more than a few weeks, while summer months often see drought with high daytime and cool night time temperatures. Late fall and most of the winter see very little sunshine in Summerland, but Summerland gets more days with sunshine during the spring than any other place in Canada. The sun makes an appearance on average of 88.4 days each spring.

Because Summerland is located up on a natural bench, it stays relatively warm at night. By comparison, Penticton experiences colder nights as the cool air sinks down into the valley below. These warm nights in a dry climate means that Summerland has the lowest morning relative humidity in Canada from May through September.

Climate data for Summerland
Month	Jan	Feb	Mar	Apr	May	Jun	Jul	Aug	Sep	Oct	Nov	Dec	Year
Record high °C (°F)	15.5 (59.9)	16.7 (62.1)	22.2 (72.0)	28.9 (84.0)	33.9 (93.0)	44.7 (112.5)	40.0 (104.0)	37.8 (100.0)	36.8 (98.2)	28.5 (83.3)	19.5 (67.1)	20.7 (69.3)	44.7 (112.5)
Mean daily maximum °C (°F)	1.2 (34.2)	4.7 (40.5)	9.8 (49.6)	15.4 (59.7)	20.4 (68.7)	23.9 (75.0)	28.4 (83.1)	28.0 (82.4)	22.4 (72.3)	13.9 (57.0)	6.1 (43.0)	1.7 (35.1)	14.7 (58.4)
Daily mean °C (°F)	−1.5 (29.3)	1.0 (33.8)	4.8 (40.6)	9.4 (48.9)	14.1 (57.4)	17.6 (63.7)	21.4 (70.5)	21.0 (69.8)	16.0 (60.8)	9.0 (48.2)	2.9 (37.2)	−0.9 (30.4)	9.6 (49.2)
Mean daily minimum °C (°F)	−4.1 (24.6)	−2.8 (27.0)	−0.2 (31.6)	3.4 (38.1)	7.7 (45.9)	11.2 (52.2)	14.3 (57.7)	13.9 (57.0)	9.6 (49.3)	4.0 (39.2)	−0.3 (31.5)	−3.5 (25.7)	4.4 (40.0)
Record low °C (°F)	−30.0 (−22.0)	−26.7 (−16.1)	−21.7 (−7.1)	−8.9 (16.0)	−5.0 (23.0)	1.5 (34.7)	4.4 (39.9)	5.6 (42.1)	−3.9 (25.0)	−14.0 (6.8)	−23.0 (−9.4)	−29.4 (−20.9)	−30.0 (−22.0)
Average precipitation mm (inches)	25.6 (1.01)	18.5 (0.73)	20.7 (0.81)	28.8 (1.13)	37.1 (1.46)	42.2 (1.66)	36.1 (1.42)	30.2 (1.19)	20.1 (0.79)	19.5 (0.77)	28.0 (1.10)	30.0 (1.18)	336.7 (13.26)
Average rainfall mm (inches)	10.2 (0.40)	12.5 (0.49)	19.1 (0.75)	28.8 (1.13)	37.1 (1.46)	42.2 (1.66)	36.1 (1.42)	30.2 (1.19)	20.1 (0.79)	19.2 (0.76)	21.5 (0.85)	10.1 (0.40)	287.0 (11.30)
Average snowfall cm (inches)	16.1 (6.3)	7.7 (3.0)	2.3 (0.9)	0.0 (0.0)	0.0 (0.0)	0.0 (0.0)	0.0 (0.0)	0.0 (0.0)	0.0 (0.0)	0.2 (0.1)	6.7 (2.6)	21.0 (8.3)	54.0 (21.3)
Average precipitation days (≥ 0.2 mm)	10.3	9.3	9.1	11.2	11.5	11.2	9.7	8.6	5.9	7.3	12.6	12.1	118.8
Average rainy days (≥ 0.2 mm)	5.1	6.3	8.6	11.2	11.5	11.2	9.7	8.6	5.9	7.2	10.8	4.6	100.8
Average snowy days (≥ 0.2 cm)	5.8	3.3	0.9	0.0	0.0	0.0	0.0	0.0	0.0	0.1	2.5	8.1	20.7
Mean monthly sunshine hours	40.8	93.9	160.0	195.2	248.1	256.3	302.2	283.2	223.2	148.9	64.2	42.0	2,057.9
Percentage possible sunshine	15.2	33.1	43.5	47.4	52.2	52.7	61.6	63.3	58.8	44.4	23.4	16.5	42.7

== International relations ==
Summerland serves as a sister city with two cities

- Omak, Washington, United States
- Toyokoro, Hokkaido, Japan.

== Notable people ==
- Tim Coghlin – St. Norbert Green Knights men's college ice hockey coach
- Helena Deland – singer/songwriter
- Nicole Dunsdon – Miss Canada 1992
- Winston Hauschild – record producer
- Larry Hale – National Hockey League (NHL) defemceman
- Shane Heyer – National Hockey League (NHL) linesman
- Cynthia Kereluk – Miss Canada 1984
- Morgan Kohan – actress
- Justin Kripps – Bobsleigh, Olympic gold medalist
- Dan O'Rourke – National Hockey League (NHL) referee
- Steve O'Rourke – Seattle Torrent (PWHL) head coach
- Kristi Richards – Freestyle skier
- George Ryga – playwright and novelist
