= Surrey, British Columbia =

City in Canada

Surrey
- City
- City of Surrey
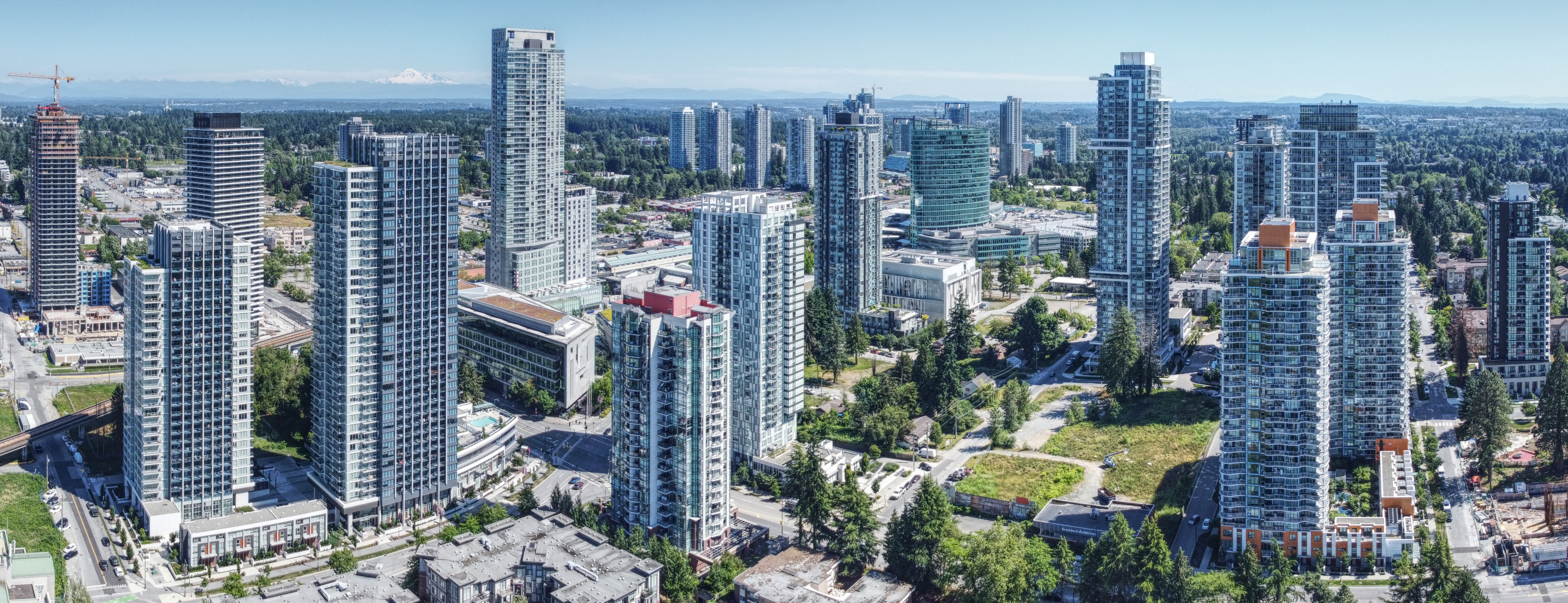
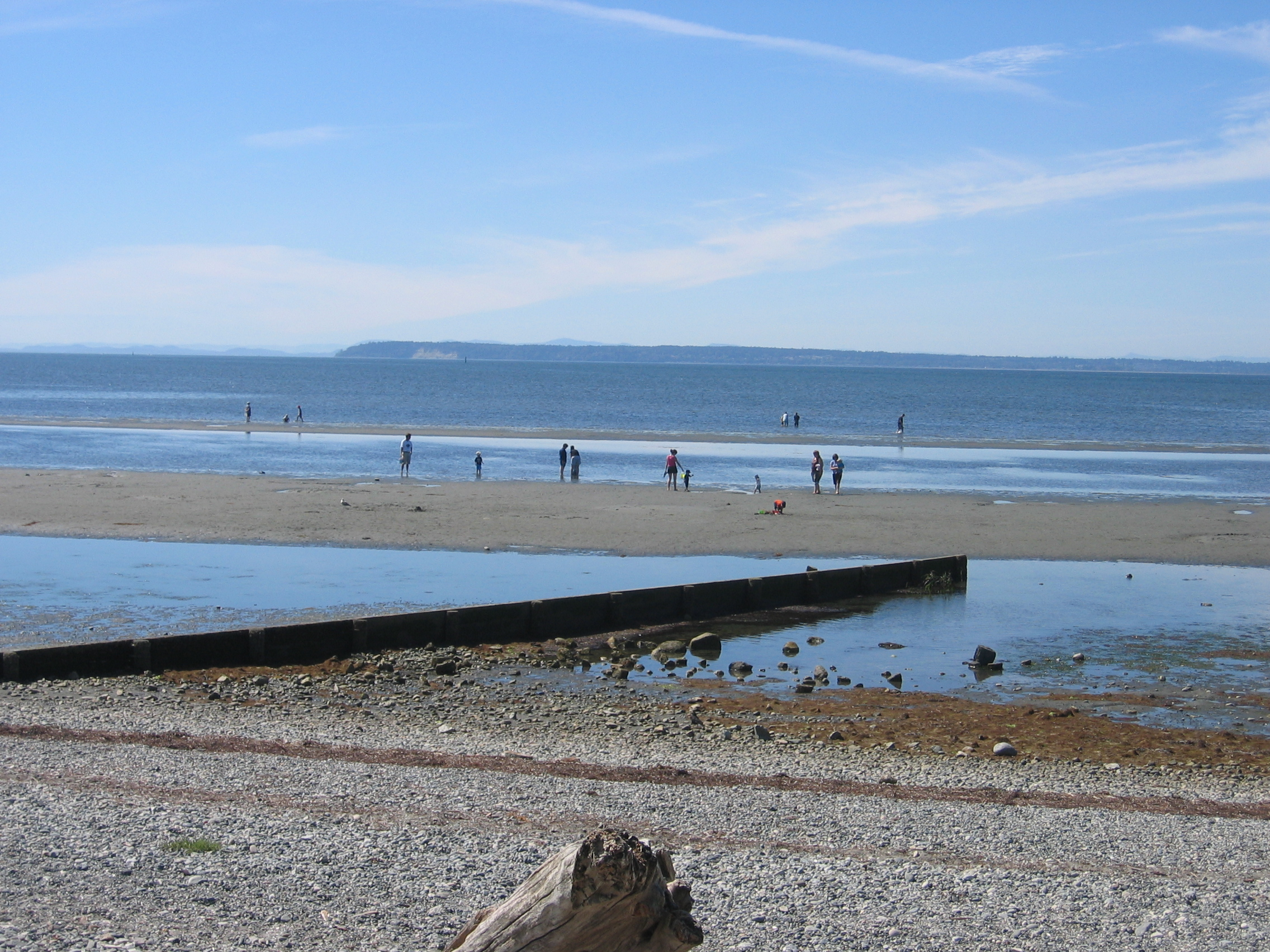
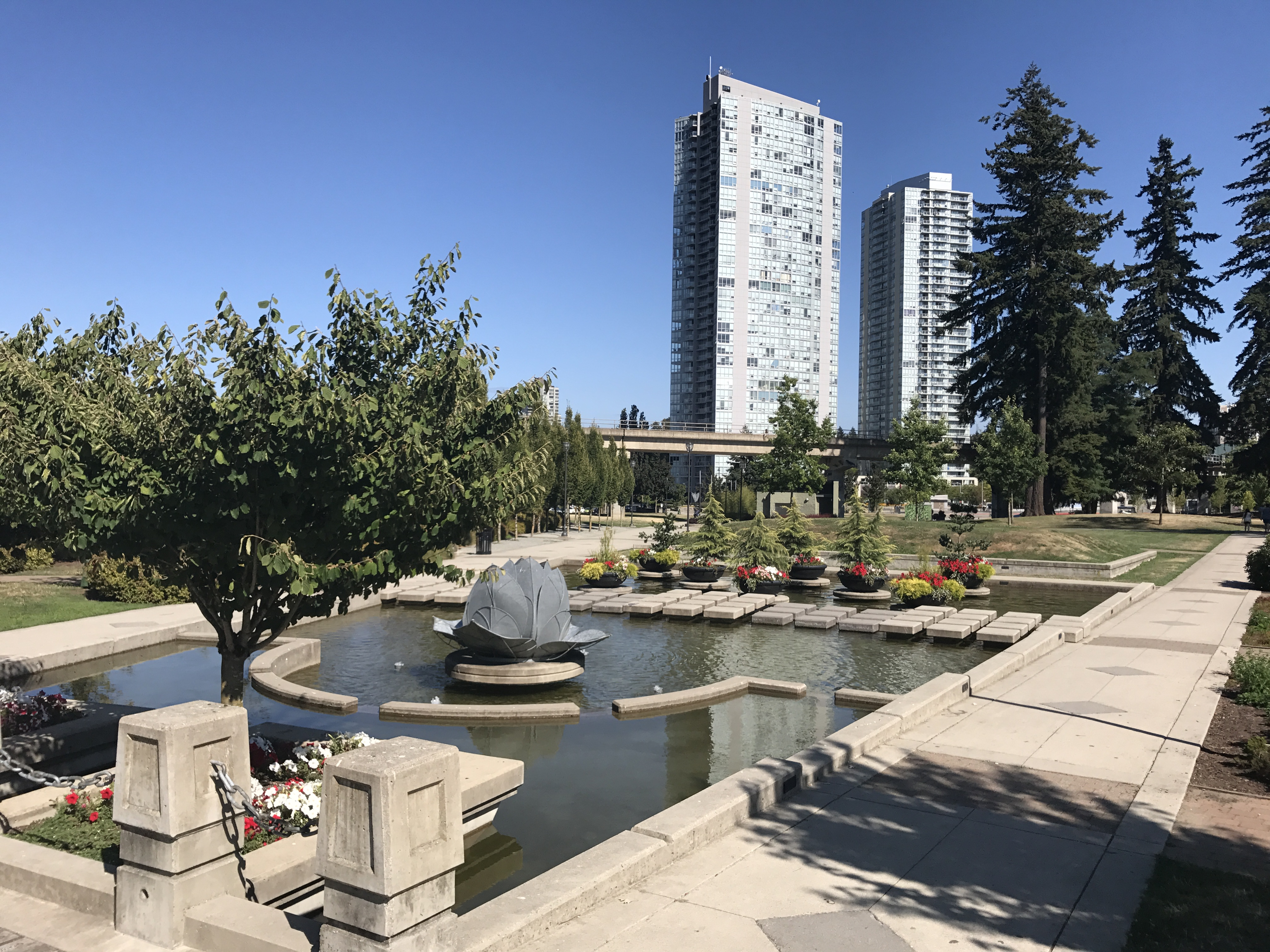
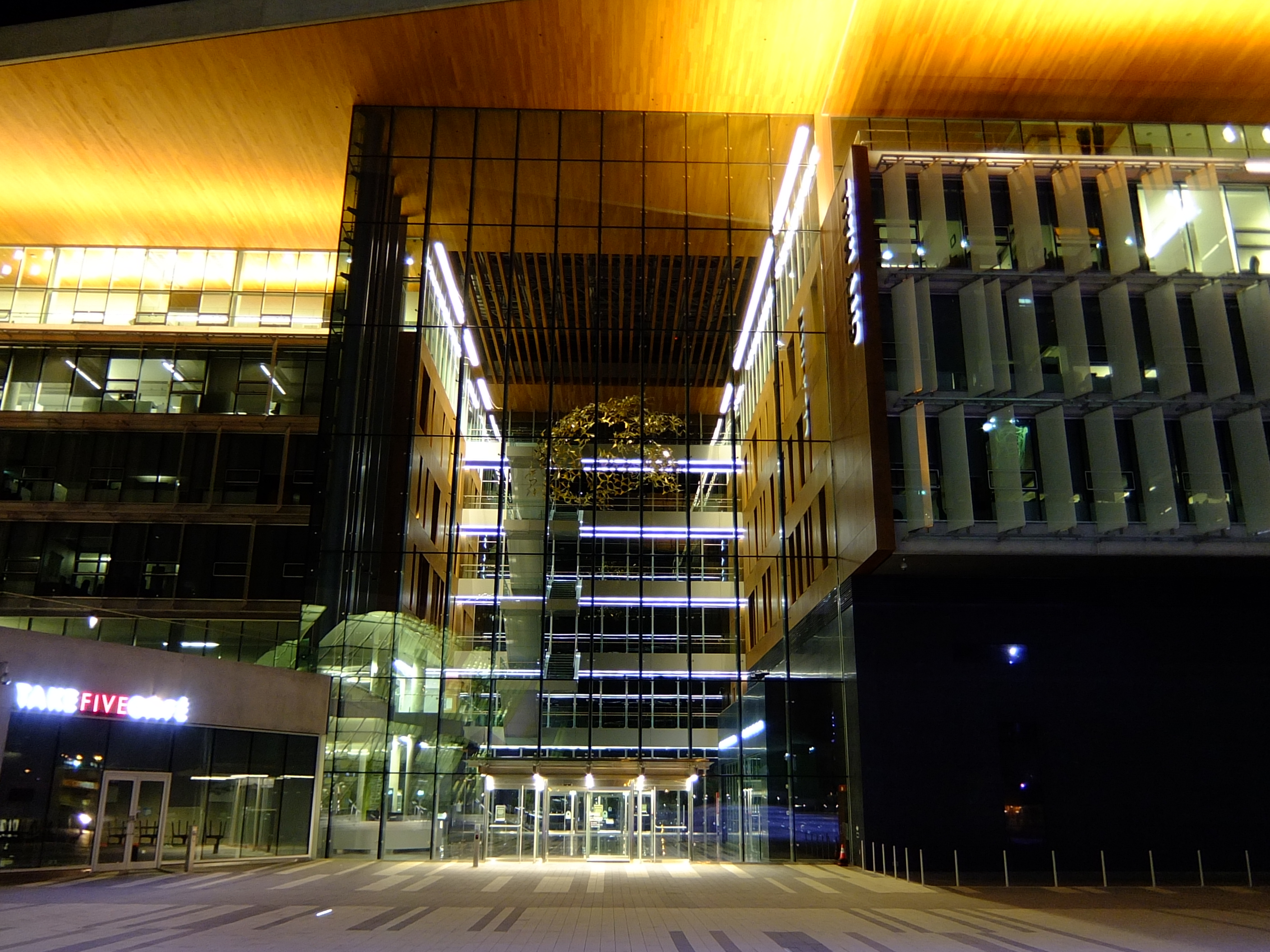
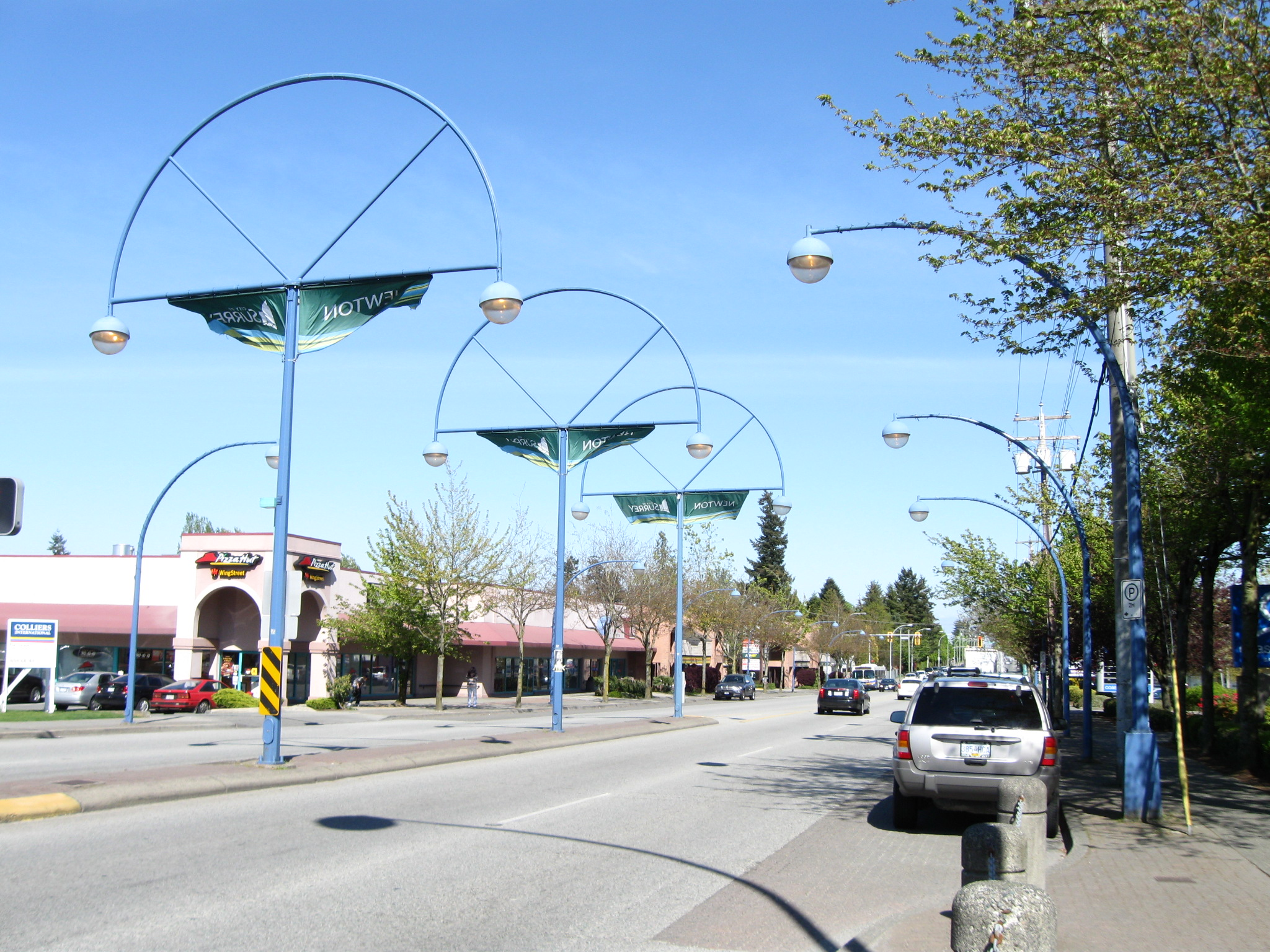
- Skyline of the Surrey City Centre in Whalley Crescent Beach Holland Park Surrey City Hall Newton Town Centre

- Flag Coat of arms Logo
- Nickname: City of Parks
- Motto: Progressio per diversitatem "Progress through diversity"
- Location of Surrey in Metro Vancouver
- Coordinates: 49°11′24″N 122°50′56″W
- Country: Canada
- Province: British Columbia
- Regional district: Metro Vancouver
- Incorporated: November 10, 1879 (municipality status)
- September 11, 1993 (city status)
- Named for: Surrey, United Kingdom
- Seat: Surrey City Hall

Government
  - Type: Mayor-council government
  - Body: Surrey City Council
  - Mayor: Doug McCallum (Safe Surrey Coalition)

Area
  - Land: 316.11 km^{2} (122.05 sq mi)
  - Rank: 3rd in British Columbia
- Highest elevation: 134 m (440 ft)
- Lowest elevation: 0 m (0 ft)

Population (2021)
  - Total: 568,322
  - Estimate (2026): 733,760
  - Rank: 11th in Canada; 2nd in British Columbia; 2nd in Metro Vancouver
  - Density: 1,797.9/km^{2} (4,657/sq mi)
- Demonym: Surreyite
- Time zone: UTC−07:00 (PCT)
- Forward sortation area: V3R–V3X, V3Z–V4A, V4N–V4P
- Area codes: 604, 778, 236, 672
- Website: surrey.ca

Surrey (/ˈsɜːr.i/, SUR-ee) is a city in British Columbia, Canada. It is located south of the Fraser River on the Canada–United States border. It is a member municipality of the Metro Vancouver regional district and metropolitan area.

Mainly a suburban city, Surrey is the province's second-largest by population after Vancouver and the third-largest by area after Abbotsford and Prince George. Seven neighbourhoods in Surrey are designated town centres: Cloverdale, Fleetwood, Guildford, Newton, South Surrey, and City Centre encompassed by Whalley.

== History ==
Surrey was incorporated in 1879 and sits upon the lands of a number of Indigenous nations, namely the Katzie and the Kwantlen (who speak Halkomelem) and the Semiahmoo, who speak the North Straits Salish language, similar to the Saanich people. When Englishman H.J. Brewer looked across the Fraser River from New Westminster and saw it was reminiscent of his native County of Surrey in England, the settlement of Surrey was placed on the map.

The area then comprised forests of Douglas fir, fir, red cedar, hemlock, blackberry bushes, and cranberry bogs. A portion of present-day Whalley (named after Harry Whalley, who owned and operated a gas bar at the bend in King George Blvd, (formerly King George Highway) at 108 Avenue, "Whalley's Corner") was used as a burial ground by the Kwantlen (or Qw'ontl'en) Nation.

Settlers arrived first in Cloverdale and parts of South Surrey, mostly to farm, fish, harvest oysters, or set up small stores. Once the Pattullo Bridge was erected in 1937, the way was open for Surrey to expand. In the post-war 1950s, North Surrey's neighbourhoods filled with single-family homes. Surrey, not yet a city, became a bedroom community, absorbing commuters who worked in Burnaby or Vancouver.

In the 1980s and 1990s, the city witnessed unprecedented growth, as people from different parts of Canada and the world, particularly Asia, began to make the municipality their home. Rapid growth continued into the 21st century, with the city having an estimated population of 733,760 in 2026. Metro Vancouver Regional District baseline projections released in September 2025 estimate that Surrey will surpass Vancouver's population by 2038, while some private economic forecasts project the crossover could occur as early as 2027.

== Geography ==
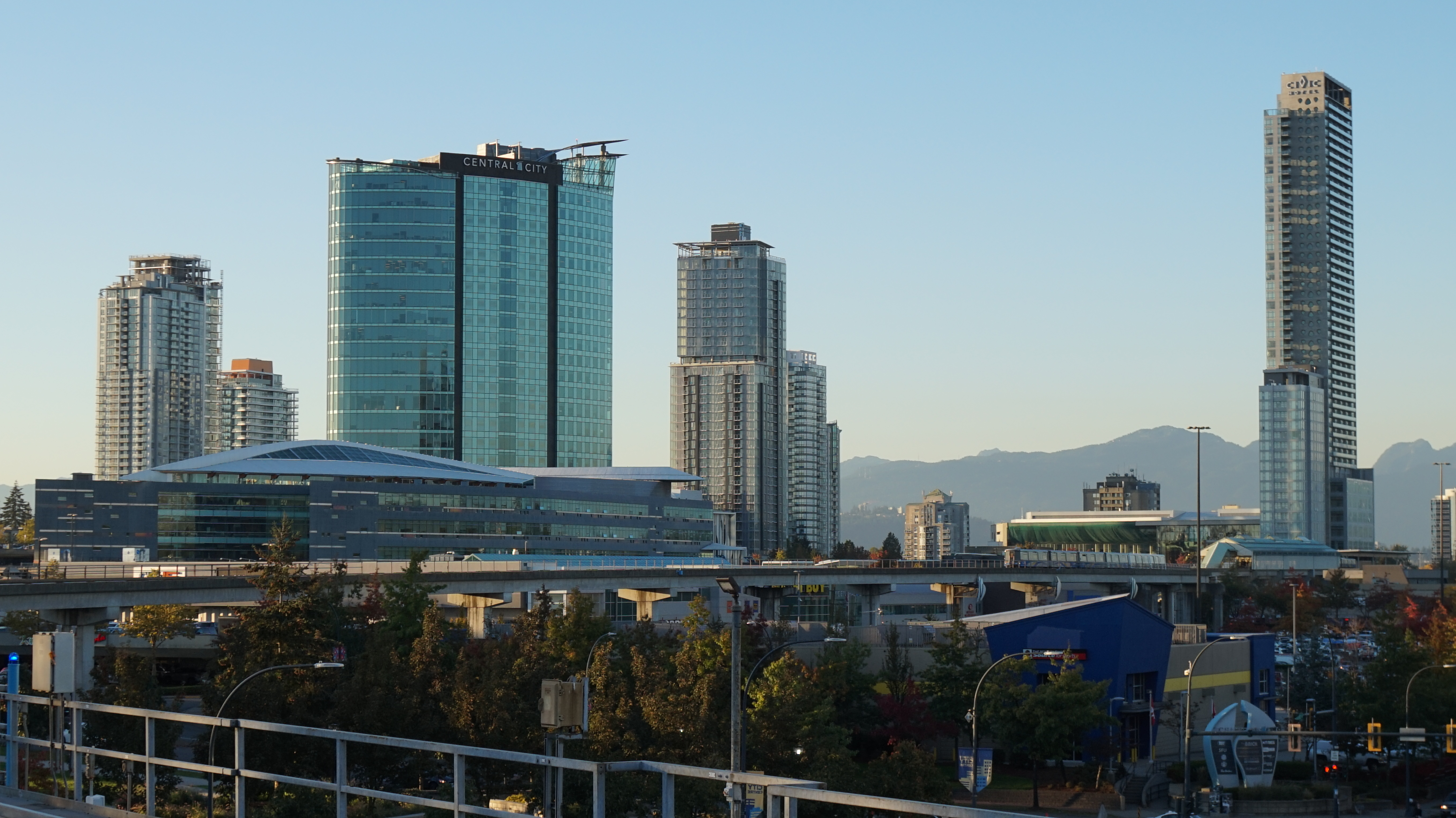
Whalley City Centre

The city is characterized by low population density urban sprawl, typical of North American cities, which includes areas of residential housing, light industry and commercial centres and is prone to strip development and malls.

Approximately 2,465 hectares (6,091 acres) or 27 percent of the land area is designated as part of the Agricultural Land Reserve and can only be used for farming. The city is mostly hills and flatland, with most of the flatland in Tynehead, Hazelmere, the south of Cloverdale, and Colebrook.

=== Climate ===
Surrey has an oceanic climate (Cfb) typical of the inter-coastal Pacific Northwest: rainy, wet winters, often with heavy rainfall lasting into early spring. Winters are chilly but not frigid. Summers are mild and sunny, and autumns are cool and cloudy.

Climate data for Surrey (1981–2010)
Month	Jan	Feb	Mar	Apr	May	Jun	Jul	Aug	Sep	Oct	Nov	Dec	Year
Record high °C (°F)	15.5 (59.9)	19.4 (66.9)	25.0 (77.0)	29.0 (84.2)	34.5 (94.1)	33.3 (91.9)	35.0 (95.0)	34.5 (94.1)	34.5 (94.1)	29.0 (84.2)	21.0 (69.8)	16.7 (62.1)	35.0 (95.0)
Mean daily maximum °C (°F)	6.7 (44.1)	8.7 (47.7)	11.7 (53.1)	14.6 (58.3)	17.9 (64.2)	20.4 (68.7)	23.1 (73.6)	23.6 (74.5)	20.9 (69.6)	14.5 (58.1)	8.7 (47.7)	6.1 (43.0)	14.7 (58.5)
Daily mean °C (°F)	3.8 (38.8)	5.1 (41.2)	7.5 (45.5)	10.0 (50.0)	13.0 (55.4)	15.6 (60.1)	17.9 (64.2)	18.2 (64.8)	15.5 (59.9)	10.4 (50.7)	5.9 (42.6)	3.4 (38.1)	10.5 (50.9)
Mean daily minimum °C (°F)	0.9 (33.6)	1.4 (34.5)	3.3 (37.9)	5.3 (41.5)	8.0 (46.4)	10.8 (51.4)	12.5 (54.5)	12.7 (54.9)	10.0 (50.0)	6.3 (43.3)	3.1 (37.6)	0.6 (33.1)	6.2 (43.2)
Record low °C (°F)	−17.2 (1.0)	−13.5 (7.7)	−8.3 (17.1)	−2.8 (27.0)	−1.1 (30.0)	2.2 (36.0)	2.8 (37.0)	−1.1 (30.0)	−2.2 (28.0)	−6.5 (20.3)	−15.0 (5.0)	−18.9 (−2.0)	−18.9 (−2.0)
Average precipitation mm (inches)	186.4 (7.34)	124.8 (4.91)	121.8 (4.80)	109.8 (4.32)	87.9 (3.46)	72.1 (2.84)	49.0 (1.93)	42.0 (1.65)	59.7 (2.35)	138.5 (5.45)	225.0 (8.86)	182.1 (7.17)	1,399.1 (55.08)
Average rainfall mm (inches)	172.0 (6.77)	117.4 (4.62)	120.0 (4.72)	109.5 (4.31)	87.9 (3.46)	72.1 (2.84)	49.0 (1.93)	42.0 (1.65)	59.7 (2.35)	138.1 (5.44)	223.4 (8.80)	169.9 (6.69)	1,360.8 (53.57)
Average snowfall cm (inches)	14.5 (5.7)	7.4 (2.9)	1.8 (0.7)	0.3 (0.1)	0.0 (0.0)	0.0 (0.0)	0.0 (0.0)	0.0 (0.0)	0.0 (0.0)	0.4 (0.2)	1.6 (0.6)	12.2 (4.8)	38.2 (15.0)
Average precipitation days (≥ 0.2 mm)	19.3	16.0	17.8	16.2	14.3	12.7	8.4	7.4	8.3	16.3	22.2	19.4	178.0
Average rainy days (≥ 0.2 mm)	18.4	15.1	17.8	16.2	14.3	12.7	8.4	7.4	8.3	16.2	22.1	18.1	174.7
Average snowy days (≥ 0.2 cm)	2.2	1.6	0.55	0.10	0.0	0.0	0.0	0.0	0.0	0.11	0.56	2.4	7.4
Source: Environment Canada

== Demographics ==
Population history
Year	Pop.	±%
1921	5,814	—
1931	8,388	+44.3%
1941	14,840	+76.9%
1951	33,670	+126.9%
1956	49,366	+46.6%
1961	70,838	+43.5%
1966	81,826	+15.5%
1971	98,601	+20.5%
1976	116,497	+18.1%
1981	147,138	+26.3%
1986	181,447	+23.3%
1991	245,173	+35.1%
1996	304,477	+24.2%
2001	347,825	+14.2%
2006	394,976	+13.6%
2011	468,251	+18.6%
2016	517,887	+10.6%
2021	568,322	+9.7%
Source: Statistics Canada

In the 2021 Canadian census, Surrey had a population of 568,322 living in 185,671 of its 195,098 total private dwellings, a change of 9.7% from its 2016 population of 517,887. With a land area of 316.11 km^{2} (122.05 sq mi), it had a population density of 1,797.9/km^{2} (4,656.4/sq mi) in 2021.

Surrey is the 11th largest city in Canada, and is also the fifth-largest city in Western Canada, after Calgary, Edmonton, Winnipeg and Vancouver. Surrey forms an integral part of Metro Vancouver as it is the largest city in the region by land area, while serving as the secondary economic core of the metropolitan area. When combined with the City of Vancouver, both cities account for nearly 50 percent of the region's population. In recent years, a rapidly expanding urban core in Downtown Surrey, located in Whalley has transformed the area into the secondary downtown core in Metro Vancouver.

=== Ethnicity ===
Largest panethnic groups in Surrey by census tract based on the 2021 census

Neighbourhoods include City Centre, Whalley, Newton, Guildford, Fleetwood, Cloverdale and South Surrey. Each neighbourhood includes ethnically diverse populations. In 2016, areas with a large proportion of Europeans included South Surrey (72 percent) and Cloverdale (69 percent). South Asians were the majority in Newton (58 percent) and Whalley (51 percent).

Immigration to Surrey drastically increased beginning in the 1980s. This created a more ethnically and linguistically diverse city. 52 percent do not speak English as their first language. Approximately 38 percent of the city's inhabitants are of South Asian heritage. Beginning in the 1990s, an influx of South Asians began moving to the city from the Punjabi Market neighbourhood of South Vancouver due to rising housing costs and rapidly increasing rent costs for businesses. The outflow of these residents combined with increased immigration from the Indian Subcontinent and established in Surrey one of the largest concentrations of South Asian residents in North America.

Other significant groups in the city in 2021 included East Asians (Note: Statistic includes total responses of "Chinese", "Korean", and "Japanese" under visible minority section on census.) (10.9 percent) and Southeast Asians (Note: Statistic includes total responses of "Filipino" and "Southeast Asian" under visible minority section on census.) (9.7 percent). Forming nearly 2.3 percent of the total population in 2021, the Black community of Surrey was small, though the city was home to the largest Black population in British Columbia. Roughly 21 percent of the entire Black population of the province resided in Surrey. Similar to most cities across English-speaking Canada, a large majority (64 percent) of Surrey residents of European heritage can trace their roots to the British Isles.

Pan-ethnic groups in Surrey (2021): 1. South Asian (37.8%); 2. European (30.8%); 3. East Asian (10.9%); 4. Southeast Asian (9.71%); 5. African (2.29%); 6. Middle Eastern (2.24%); 7. Indigenous (2.16%); 8. Latin American (1.57%); 9. Other / multiracial (2.53%)	Pan-ethnic groups in Surrey (2011): 1. European (45.0%); 2. South Asian (30.7%); 3. East Asian (8.48%); 4. Southeast Asian (8.54%); 5. Indigenous (2.36%); 6. African (1.33%); 7. Middle Eastern (1.21%); 8. Latin American (1.15%); 9. Other / multiracial (1.16%)	Pan-ethnic groups in Surrey (2001): 1. European (61.3%); 2. South Asian (21.9%); 3. East Asian (6.83%); 4. Southeast Asian (4.75%); 5. Indigenous (1.99%); 6. African (1.10%); 7. Middle Eastern (0.67%); 8. Latin American (0.96%); 9. Other / multiracial (0.54%)

Panethnic groups in Surrey (2001−2021)
Panethnic group	2021		2016		2011		2006		2001	
Panethnic group	Pop.	%	Pop.	%	Pop.	%	Pop.	%	Pop.	%
South Asian	212,680	37.81%	168,040	32.85%	142,445	30.74%	107,810	27.47%	75,680	21.89%
European (Note: Statistic includes all persons that did not make up part of a visible minority or an indigenous identity.)	173,155	30.78%	198,835	38.87%	208,625	45.03%	203,815	51.93%	211,870	61.27%
East Asian	61,360	10.91%	52,025	10.17%	39,270	8.48%	29,965	7.64%	23,600	6.83%
Southeast Asian	54,635	9.71%	44,875	8.77%	39,560	8.54%	25,795	6.57%	16,440	4.75%
African	12,870	2.29%	9,455	1.85%	6,150	1.33%	5,015	1.28%	3,810	1.1%
Middle Eastern (Note: Statistic includes total responses of "West Asian" and "Arab" under visible minority section on census.)	12,620	2.24%	9,485	1.85%	5,615	1.21%	3,595	0.92%	2,300	0.67%
Indigenous	12,175	2.16%	13,460	2.63%	10,955	2.36%	7,630	1.94%	6,895	1.99%
Latin American	8,830	1.57%	7,065	1.38%	5,340	1.15%	3,785	0.96%	3,315	0.96%
Other/multiracial (Note: Statistic includes total responses of "Visible minority, n.i.e." and "Multiple visible minorities" under visible minority section on census.)	14,240	2.53%	8,315	1.63%	5,385	1.16%	5,050	1.29%	1,880	0.54%
Total responses	562,565	98.99%	511,540	98.77%	463,340	98.95%	392,450	99.36%	345,780	99.41%
Total population	568,322	100%	517,887	100%	468,251	100%	394,976	100%	347,825	100%
Note: Totals greater than 100% due to multiple origin responses

=== Religion ===
Religion in Surrey (2021)
1. Christianity (30.2%)
2. No religion (28.8%)
3. Sikhism (27.4%)
4. Islam (5.50%)
5. Hinduism (5.40%)
6. Buddhism (1.90%)
7. Judaism (0.20%)
8. Indigenous (0.10%)
9. Other religions (0.50%)

Largest religious affiliation in Surrey by census tract based on the 2021 census

Proportionally, Surrey has the largest Sikh population percentage (27.4 percent) out of all subdivisions in Canada.

In 2021, the top five most reported religious affiliations in Surrey were Christianity (170,115 or 30.2 percent), Irreligion (161,860 or 28.6 percent), Sikhism (154,415 or 27.4 percent), Islam (31,095 or 5.5 percent), and Hinduism (30,455 or 5.4 percent).

Religious groups in the City of Surrey (1991−2021)
Religious group	2021 Canadian census		2011 Canadian census		2001 Canadian census		1991 Canadian census	
Religious group	Pop.	%	Pop.	%	Pop.	%	Pop.	%
Christianity	170,115	30.24%	177,020	38.21%	172,230	49.81%	148,825	61.14%
Irreligion	161,860	28.77%	132,635	28.63%	89,135	25.78%	65,810	27.04%
Sikhism	154,415	27.45%	104,720	22.6%	56,325	16.29%	20,905	8.59%
Islam	31,095	5.53%	18,345	3.96%	10,000	2.89%	2,565	1.05%
Hinduism	30,455	5.41%	16,790	3.62%	9,620	2.78%	2,495	1.02%
Buddhism	10,745	1.91%	10,520	2.27%	6,655	1.92%	1,730	0.71%
Judaism	900	0.16%	1,105	0.24%	665	0.19%	450	0.18%
Indigenous spirituality	205	0.04%	180	0.04%	355	0.1%	—N/a	—N/a
Other	2,770	0.49%	2,015	0.43%	800	0.23%	640	0.26%
Total responses	562,565	98.99%	463,340	98.95%	345,785	99.41%	243,425	99.29%
Total population	568,322	100%	468,251	100%	347,825	100%	245,173	100%

=== Language ===
Languages with over 2,500 speakers
Mother tongue	Population	Percentage
English	243,510	43.2%
Punjabi	128,305	22.7%
Mandarin	28,080	5.0%
Tagalog	18,640	3.3%
Hindi	14,540	2.6%
Korean	8,690	1.5%
Cantonese	8,165	1.4%
Spanish	7,565	1.3%
Vietnamese	6,860	1.2%
Arabic	6,135	1.1%
Urdu	5,820	1.0%
Persian (including Dari)	3,115	0.6%
French	2,910	0.5%
German	2,860	0.5%

=== Economic indicators ===
In 2010, Surrey had the highest median family income of CA$78,283, while the BC provincial median was $71,660, and the national median was $74,540. The average family income was $85,765. South Surrey area had the highest average household income of all six town centres in Surrey, with an average of $86,824 as of 2010. Median household income was also high at $62,960. South Surrey's neighbourhood of Rosemary Heights is the richest in Surrey and throughout the Metro Vancouver area, with a median income more than twice the regional average.

In 2010, the median household income of Surrey was $67,702 (versus the national median of $76,437), where 29.4 percent of households in Surrey earned a household total income of $100,000 or more, which is above the national average of 25.9 percent.

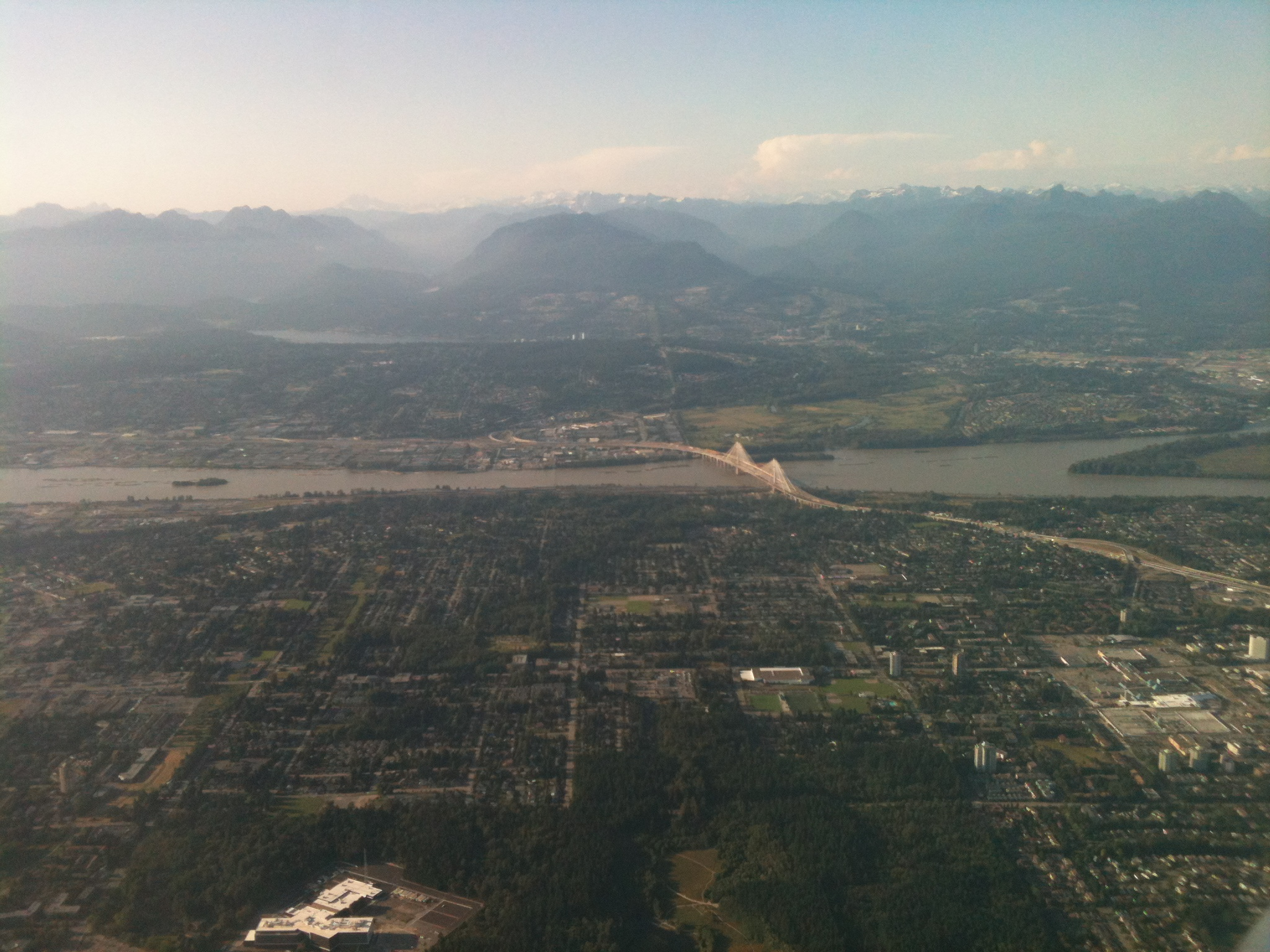
A partial view of Surrey from a plane

== Economy ==
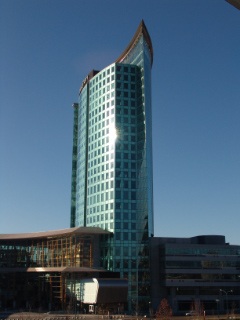
Central City, the tallest building in Surrey from 2003 to 2017

Surrey is one of the largest industrial centres in British Columbia, with sectors including high technology, clean energy, advanced manufacturing, health, education, agriculture, and the arts.

Increase in filming activity in Surrey resulted in 189 productions, including 15 at the city hall plaza, in 2017.

In 2018, Surrey opened a $68 million biofuel facility, the first in North America.

There were six employers in Surrey in 2017 each with more than 1,000 staff across BC: Fraser Health with 25,000; School District 36 with 10,560; City of Surrey with 3,400; Coast Capital Savings with 1,738; Starline Windows Group with 1,400; Kwantlen Polytechnic University with 1,332.

=== Agriculture ===
Farming has strongly been attached to the economic well-being of Surrey, as the city of Surrey itself fostered and cemented a robust culture of farming. Approximately a third of Surrey's land is preserved and designated as farmland that is utilized for the local production of food to cater the city's growing population and increasing employment opportunities via the creation of local jobs. In 2015, agriculture employed 3,300 people, or 1.6 percent of Surrey's overall labour force.

=== Manufacturing ===
Manufacturing is also a highly diversified sector. Lumber is cut for BC logging firms. Wind turbines are produced for the clean energy sector.

=== Health care ===
The health sector makes a significant contribution to Surrey's economy. Surrey is home to almost 900 health-related businesses where major focuses in several life science sub-sectors that include infectious diseases, marine bio-science, neuroscience, oncology and regenerative medicine. Surrey Memorial Hospital is the second largest employer in the City of Surrey with an annual operating budget of $149.2 million. Fraser Health, overseeing healthcare in the region, employs more than 4,100 people and an additional 350 active physicians at SMH. Due to population growth in the region, a new hospital in Surrey is planned to be built in Cloverdale; in 2021, it was projected to be completed in 2026.

== Government and politics ==
Surrey is governed by the elected Surrey City Council comprising a mayor and eight councillors. As of the October 15, 2022, election, the mayor is Brenda Locke. City councillors are Linda Annis, Harry Bains, (Note: No relation to the provincial MLA of the same name from Surrey-Newton) Mike Bose, Doug Elford, Gordon Hepner, Pardeep Kooner, Mandeep Nagra, and Rob Stutt.

In 2004, when Gurmant Grewal's wife Nina was elected to parliament, they became the first married couple to serve Canadian parliament concurrently. Following the 2015 federal election, the Liberal Party of Canada won three of Surrey's four seats in the House of Commons of Canada. Conservative MP Dianne Watts resigned her South Surrey—White Rock seat in 2017 to compete for the leadership of the BC Liberal Party. In the subsequent 2017 by-election, the Liberal candidate Gordie Hogg defeated former Conservative MP and federal cabinet minister Kerry-Lynne Findlay.

Surrey federal election results
Year	Liberal		Conservative		New Democratic		Green	
2021	44%	91,045	30%	60,927	21%	42,791	1%	1,729
2019	39%	83,925	32%	69,931	22%	46,759	5%	11,853

Surrey provincial election results (Note: The 2024 and 2026 results include the City of White Rock.)
Year	New Democratic		Conservative		BC Liberal		Green	
2026	34%	60,958	55%	99,425	0%	0	4.5%	8,130
2024	46%	89,650	49%	95,709	0%	0	2.5%	4,834
2020	54%	94,084	0.5%	867	37%	63,251	7%	11,781
2017	47%	85,738	0%	0	41%	75,056	10%	19,064

== Culture ==
=== Attractions ===
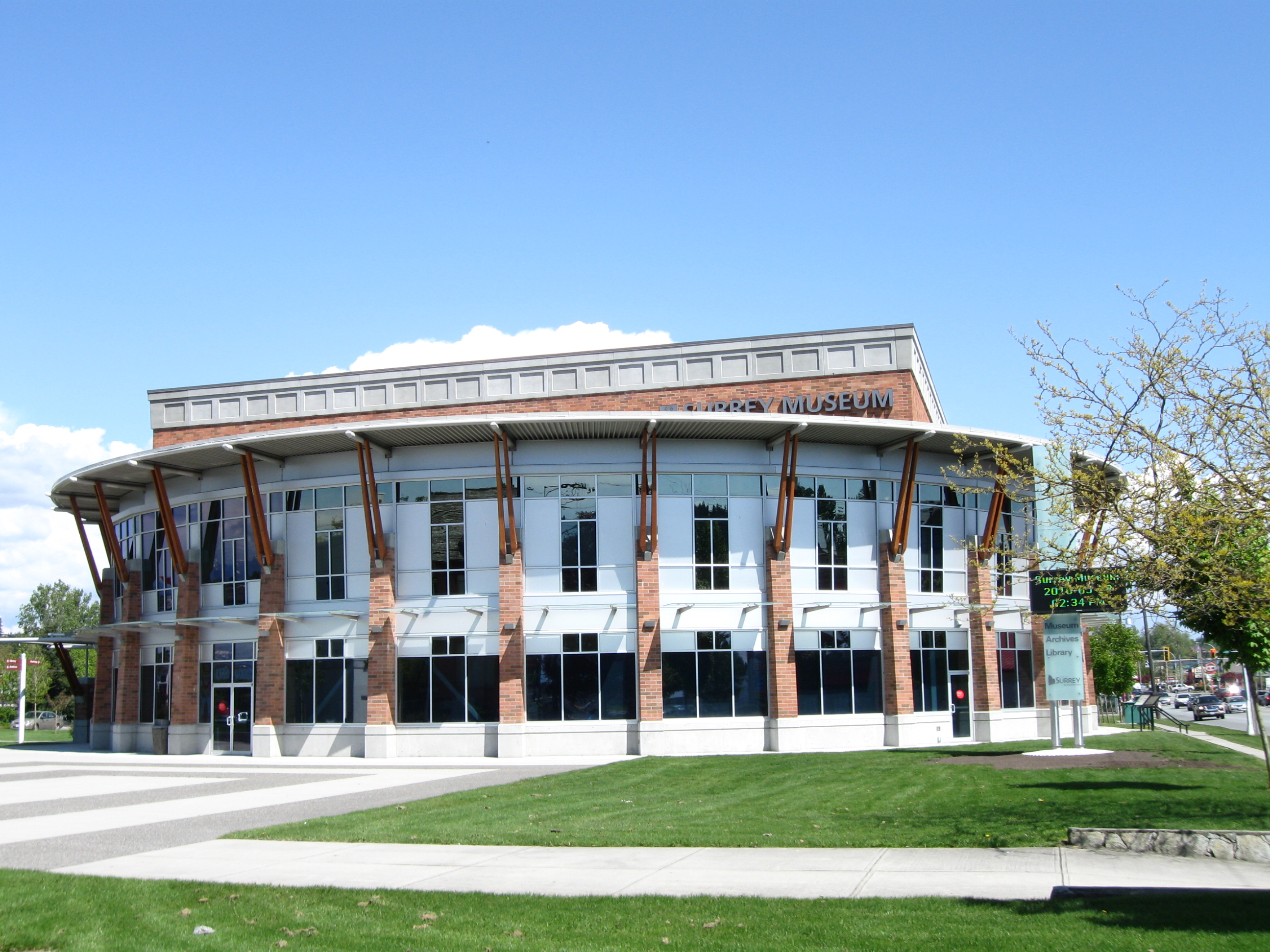
Surrey Museum in Cloverdale

The Museum of Surrey is affiliated with CMA, CHIN, and Virtual Museum of Canada. It reopened as the Museum of Surrey in September 2018, after a renovation which added 12,000 square feet (1,100 m^{2}) to the previous 24,000-square-foot (2,200 m^{2}) building.

Surrey Art Gallery is the second largest public art museum in the Metro Vancouver region. It opened in September 1975.

The historic Surrey Municipal Hall complex includes the Cenotaph in Heritage Square, the Surrey Museum, and Cloverdale Library. The Surrey City Centre Public Library located at Whalley / City Centre is the second largest library in terms of size in Metro Vancouver.

"REMEMBRANCE" by André Gauthier in Heritage Square, is an oversized bronze statue depicting a World War I kneeling soldier, helmet in hand, in remembrance of his fallen comrades.

=== Events ===
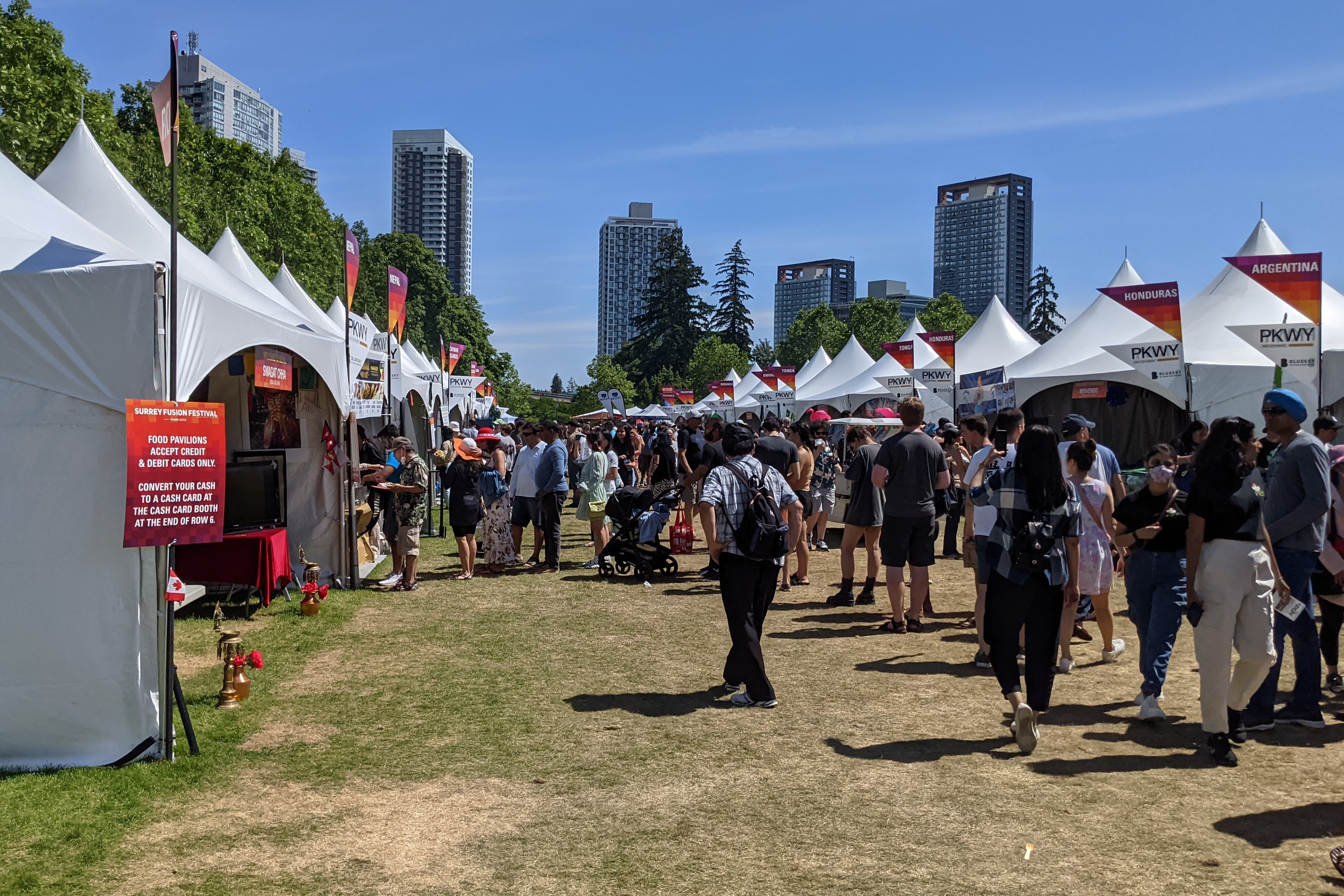
Fusion Festival at Holland Park

Attracting 15,000 people every February since 2004, WinterFest is a day of live music, sporting activities, food, and fireworks, held at the Central City Plaza.

Since 1888, the town centre of Cloverdale has hosted the annual Cloverdale Rodeo and Country Fair at the Cloverdale Fairgrounds every May long weekend. The Fair is Canada's second largest rodeo, and it features 150 acres (0.61 km^{2}) of family-oriented entertainment including agricultural/horticultural exhibits, a western tradeshow, parade, community stages, and the Pacific Northwest Firefighter Combat Challenge.

Every year on April 13, the Sikh community celebrates Vaisakhi, which often includes a nagar kirtan, or parade, and free food is often handed out. It is the largest Vaisakhi parade outside India, growing from 100,000 attendees in 2008 to over 500,000 in 2019.

Every October since 1991, Surrey has hosted the Surrey International Writers' Conference. This event brings established writers, agents, editors and publishers from all over the world to the Comfort Inn & Suites Surrey Hotel and Sheraton Vancouver Guildford Hotel in Guildford Town Centre.

There are three live theatre venues in the City of Surrey in British Columbia: the Bell Centre for Performing Arts, the Chandos Pattison Auditorium and the Surrey Arts Centre.

One of the lesser-known events in Surrey is the annual Nicomekl River Race. Every year, in early June, teams of four meet at Nicomekl Park in Langley, British Columbia to begin the race. Unlike most traditional boat races, the Nicomekl River Race requires that all boats be made by the participants. The racecourse extends from Nicomekl Park to Blackie Spit Park at Crescent Beach. The first team to reach the mouth of the river is awarded a prize of $1,000. Additional prizes are awarded to the most creative boat and costume. All proceeds go towards the BC Cancer society.

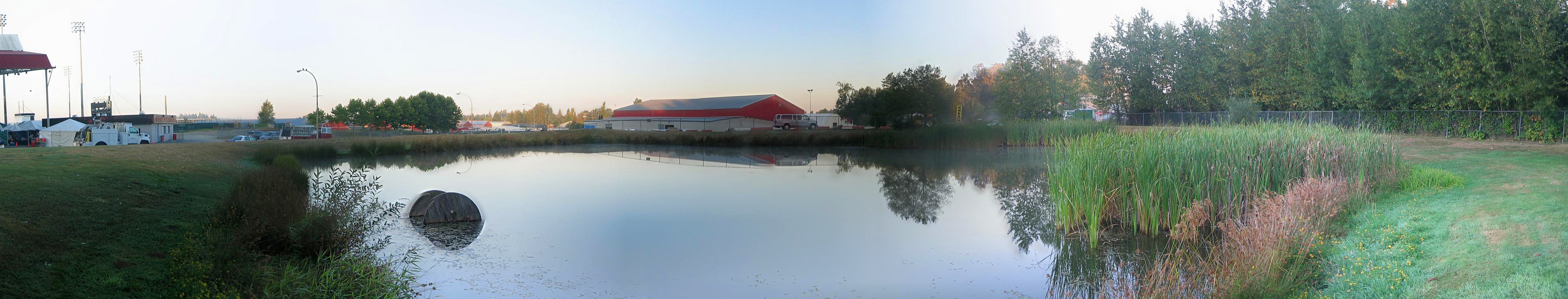
A panorama of the Cloverdale Fairgrounds

=== News media ===
In addition to news media from Vancouver, the community is served by The Surrey Now-Leader newspaper, and the Peace Arch News newspaper (for South Surrey). The city is also home to South Asian Broadcasting's ethnic radio station ReD-FM and the Asian Journal newspaper.

The first Surrey-based English-language radio station, My Surrey FM 107.7 FM, was licensed by the CRTC in 2014 and became Pulse FM 107.7 reporting about South of the Fraser news. Radio India, another Indo-Canadian radio station, has its offices in Surrey.

== Sports and recreation ==
The Green Timbers Urban Forest Park is a large urban forest and park within Surrey. Every summer, Surrey hosts the Canada Cup International Women's Fastpitch Tournament. It began in 1993 as an international women's fastpitch developmental softball tournament to help teams prepare for the Olympics by facing top-calibre competition. The event continues to be a fan favourite with gate attendance reaching 93,000 for the nine-day tournament in 2004.

The BCHL Surrey Eagles hockey team plays at the South Surrey Arena in Surrey. The Eagles won the BCHL championship, the Fred Page Cup, in 1997, 1998, 2005, 2013 and 2024; the western championship, the Doyle Cup, in 1997 and 1998; and the national championship, the Royal Bank Cup, in 1998.

The PJHL Surrey Knights relocated to the North Surrey Sport and Ice Complex from Langley in 2016. The league expanded to two Surrey teams in 2025 with the creation of the Cloverdale Hockey Club. The new team plays out of the Cloverdale Sport & Ice Complex.

Whalley Park contains 5 baseball fields, and is home to both the Whalley Chiefs of the BCPBL and Whalley Little League. Surrey hosted the Canadian national qualifying tournament in 2006, and sends a local team to compete for a spot in the Little League World Series in Williamsport, Pennsylvania. The White Rock Tritons of the BCPBL also play in Surrey, at South Surrey Athletic Park.

Surrey is also home to Canada's first kabaddi-specific stadium.

Although not considered a sport, the globally acclaimed dance company known as "Brotherhood" won gold trophies at the World Hip Hop Dance Championships in 2013 and 2014 for the varsity and adult divisions. The affiliated dance production team known as "PraiseTEAM" had taken home the silver trophy at the world finals in 2013 as well. Both dance companies are from Surrey.

Cricket is also played in Surrey. There are more than 85 teams registered with British Columbia Mainland Cricket League. There are more than 20 cricket pitches across Surrey, though the only turf pitch is in West Newton.

The Surrey Sharks field hockey team play at Tamanawis Park, and compete in the Vancouver Women's Field Hockey Association.

Two rugby union teams call Surrey home: the Surrey Beavers Athletic Association in North Surrey and the Bayside Sharks of South Surrey and White Rock. The 2026 BC Rugby Union Finals were held at Bayside's facility at South Surrey Athletic Park, although the Sharks did not qualify.

Other notable sporting events held by Surrey include:

- 2016 Women's Softball World Championship

== Transportation ==
=== History ===
The first non-Indigenous settlement of Surrey was founded near Crescent Beach, located in South Surrey; another was founded near Bridgeview/Brownsville, located in North Surrey. Early trails and roads helped to encourage the settlement of Surrey. The first trail built by a settler was the 1861 the Kennedy Trail. James Kennedy built the trail to provide a route between New Westminster and the natural pasture land on the Mud Bay Flats next to the Serpentine River. The Semiahmoo Wagon Road was built in 1873 between Brownsville (opposite New Westminster) and Semiahmoo (Blaine).

The New Westminster Rail Bridge was opened in 1904, allowing personal vehicles to cross the Fraser River on the upper deck. The lower deck, for rail, enabled BC Electric Railway to finally construct the Interurban line, an electric suburb commuter rail route connecting Chilliwack to Vancouver. It opened for service in 1910, and ran through Kennedy, Newton, Sullivan, and Cloverdale. Two of the BCER cars (1225 & 1304) are restored and are operated by the Fraser Valley Heritage Railway Society on the mainline between Cloverdale and Sullivan.

In 1937, the then two-lane Pattullo Bridge linking New Westminster and Surrey was opened.

In the early 1950s, the BC Electric Railway ceased operating its interurban line, thus increasing the number of vehicles on Surrey roads. Highway 10 was built in 1953, and Highway 15 in 1957. In 1964, the provincial government completed Highway 401 and the Port Mann Bridge; that section of roadway would later be renamed Highway 1. In 1959, the George Massey Tunnel was opened, along with what is known as Highway 99. With the completion of the new Highways 1 and 99, the Fraser Highway and King George Boulevard became major arteries.

In the early 1990s, Surrey saw the return of rail transit with the SkyTrain Expo Line expansion into Surrey. The four stations added were Scott Road, Gateway, Surrey Central and King George.

In 2026, the four-lane stal̕əw̓asəm Bridge opened to replace the Pattullo Bridge as the link between New Westminster and Surrey.

=== Transportation network ===
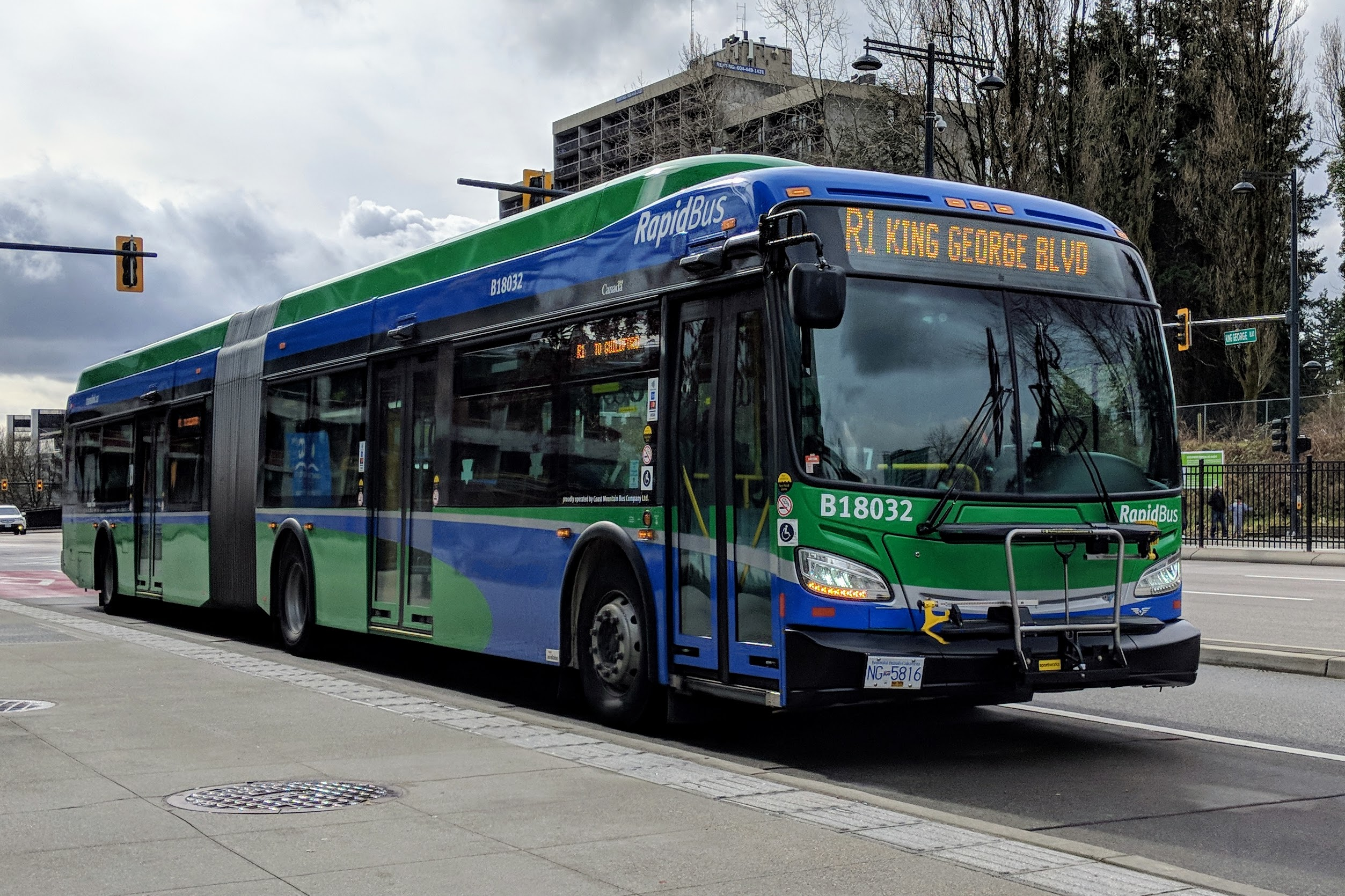
The R1 King George Blvd provides frequent bus service between Newton, Guildford and Surrey City Centre.

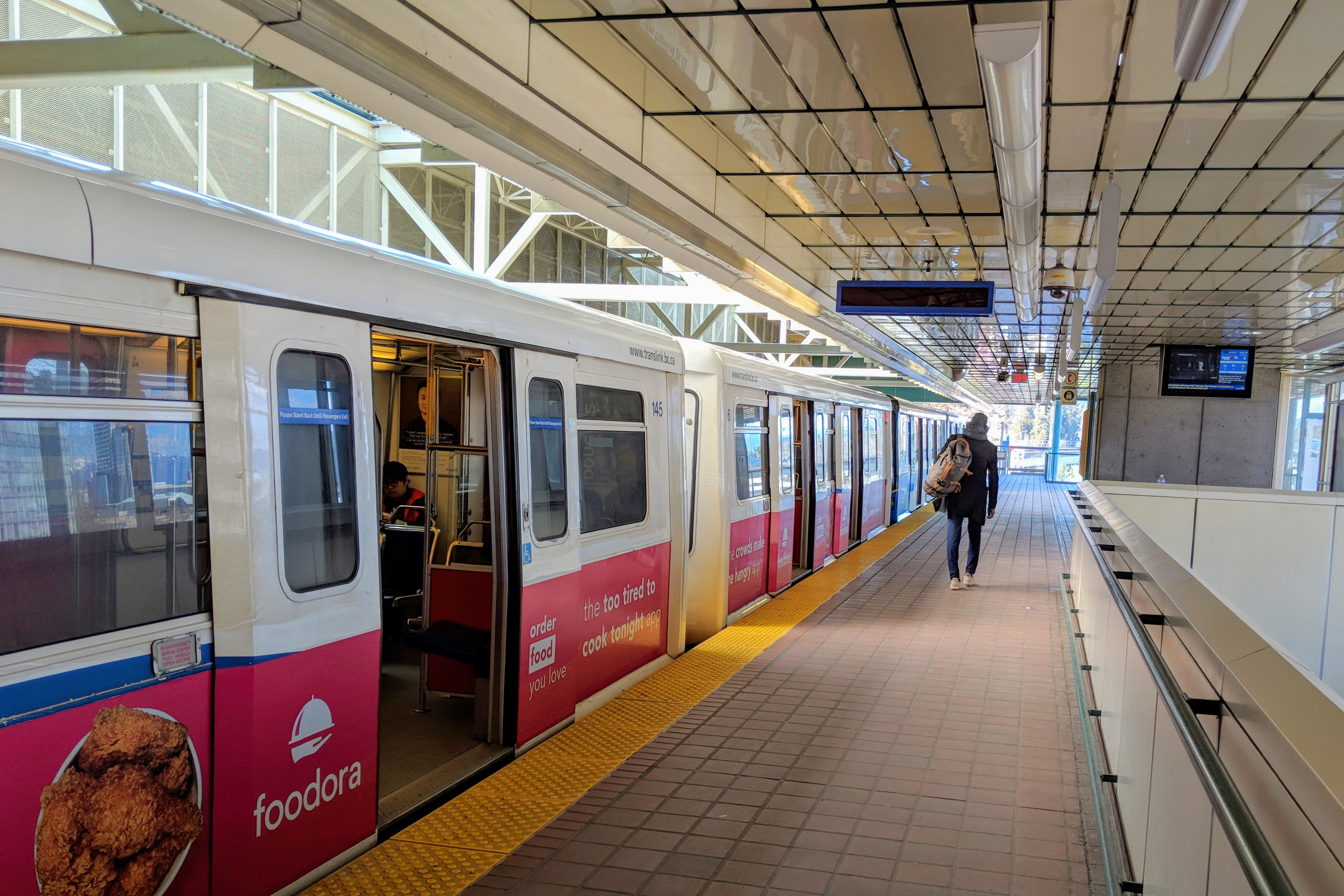
An Expo Line train at King George station; service to Downtown Vancouver begins at this station.

Public transit in Surrey, as with the rest of Metro Vancouver, is operated by TransLink, which provides frequent bus service throughout Surrey, and to other Metro Vancouver municipalities. Metro Vancouver's metropolitan rail system, SkyTrain, provides Surrey with an Expo Line service to Downtown Vancouver via four stations: Scott Road, Gateway, Surrey Central, and King George.

The Canadian National Railway, Canadian Pacific Railway, BNSF Railway, and Southern Railway of British Columbia have trackage running through Surrey.

Vancouver International Airport is located 28 kilometres (17 mi) west of Surrey. Vancouver International Airport offers direct daily service to destinations in Canada, North America, Europe, and Asia.

Bellingham International Airport is located 32 kilometres (20 mi) south of Surrey, and offers connections to Seattle, Las Vegas, and Hawaii.

Abbotsford International Airport is located 24 kilometres (15 mi) east of Surrey, and offers daily flights to Calgary and Edmonton.

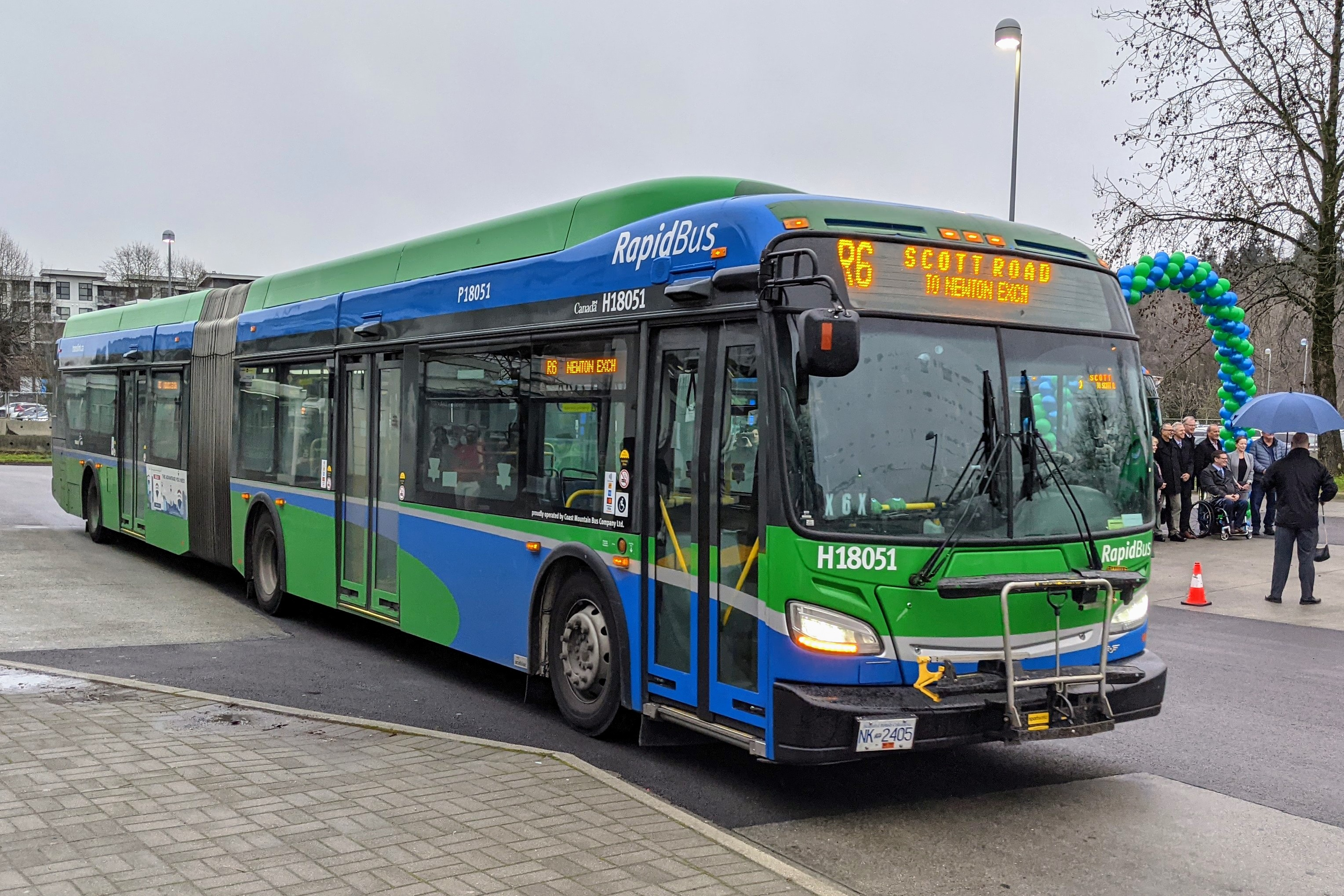
The R6 Scott Rd provides frequent bus service between Scott Road Skytrain Station and Newton Exchange.

Seaport facilities are available at the Fraser River Docks.

=== Future transportation ===
Funding a light rail transit (LRT) line linking both Newton and Guildford with Surrey City Centre was agreed to by both BC's provincial government and the federal government. The project was unpopular, and after electing a new mayor and council in October 2018, who had run on a platform to cancel the LRT line in favour of extending the existing SkyTrain line to Langley, made it their first order of business.

TransLink's Mayors' Council, who has the ultimate authority over the project, responded to this decision by indefinitely suspending work on the light rail project. In July 2019, a 7-kilometre (4.3 mi) Expo Line extension from King George station to 166 Street and Fraser Highway in Fleetwood was approved and is estimated to be completed by 2025. The plan in 2021 was to take the SkyTrain the entire way to Langley in one phase by 2028.

== Sustainable development ==
In 2008, Surrey City Council created and adopted the Surrey Sustainability Charter: a comprehensive document spanning 72 pages that takes a comprehensive look at all facets of society and creates an overarching document to guide the urban development of the city for the next 50 years. In 2011, the city council released the second update to the 2008 document indicating the progress made in the three years since the inception of the report.

=== Issues ===
==== Suburban sprawl and the Gateway Program ====
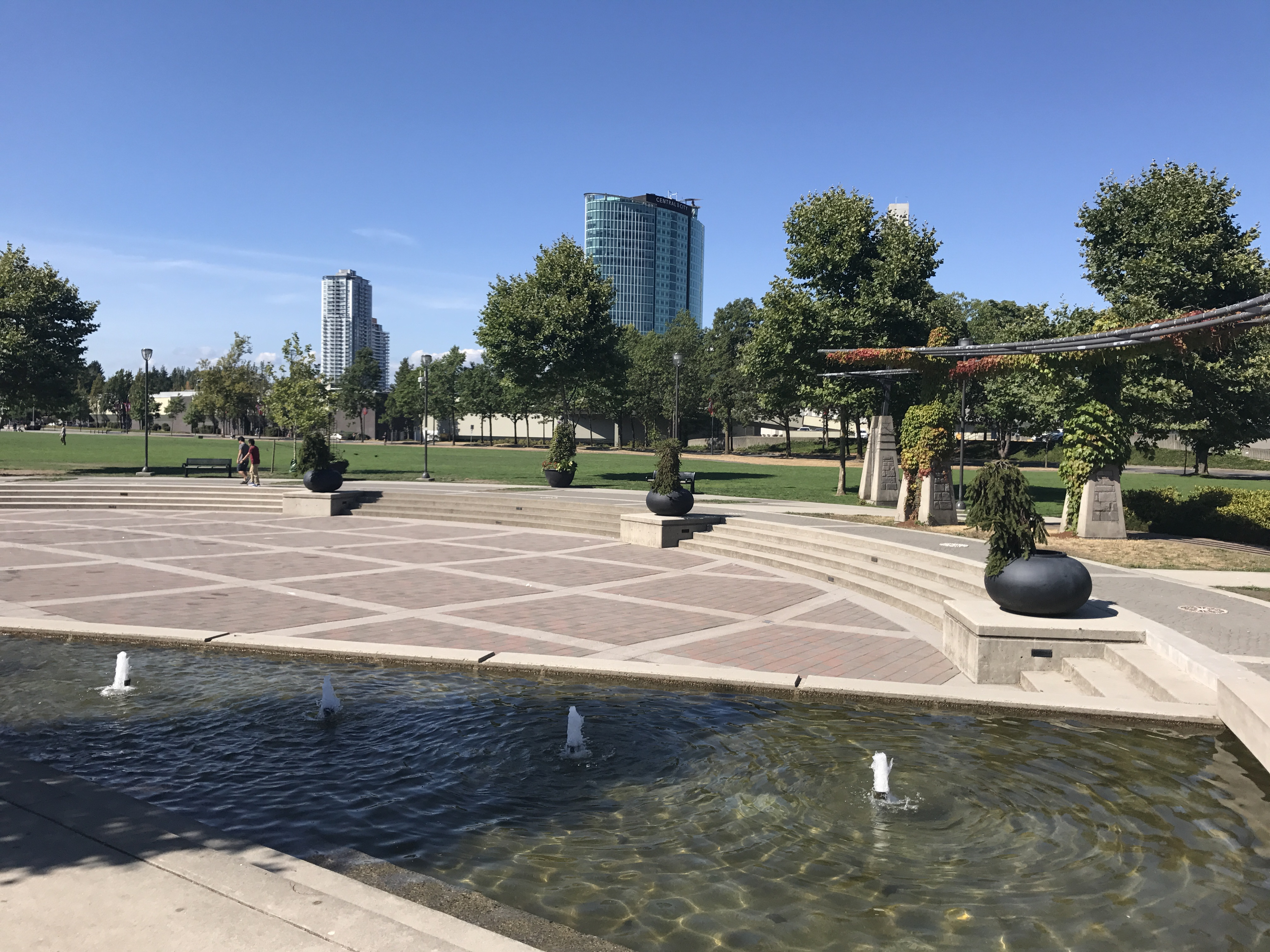
Holland Park and Residential towers in Surrey

Surrey currently faces the problem of urban sprawl, the phenomenon that is characterized by the low density residential, with almost no commercial or industrial zoning. This results in a heavy outflow of traffic in the morning, and inflow in the evening.

The announcement of the Gateway Program in 2005 by the British Columbia Ministry of Transportation meant a large expenditure in transportation infrastructure. Despite the oppositions by the Metro Vancouver and several mayoral councils, the project went ahead to create the South Fraser Perimeter Road and the Port Mann Bridge, both which pass through major portions of Surrey.

It has been criticized as contradictory to not only Metro Vancouver's Sustainable Region Initiative, but also Surrey's Sustainability Charter. Studies have shown that with an increase in road capacity, generated traffic increases, that is traffic that is diverted (shifted in time and route) and induced travel (increased total motor vehicle travel). With the construction of the 10 lane Port Mann Bridge, the problem of suburban sprawl is exacerbated not only with the additional capacity, but RapidBus service was also cancelled despite expectations of a stop in Surrey.

==== Transportation and land use ====
The Sustainability Charter hinges on a large reduction on automobile dependency requiring a well established transit infrastructure to the multiple districts of Surrey. In 2008, Gordon Campbell announced the extension of the Expo Line beyond the current terminus to as far as Langley. However, financial shortfall came upon Translink shortly after, and many of the announced plans came to a halt. Plans to expand northward via the Evergreen extension came to fruition prior to the vision of extending light rail out to Guildford, Newton and Langley. Mayor Watts attempted impose equal tolling across the region to assist with funding transit to reduce car reliance.

Protecting agricultural land reserves also play an important part in the charter of sustainability. The idea behind the agricultural land reserves is to encourage and increase the role of urban agriculture, thus reducing the reliance of food transport and increasing the quality and availability of food to local people. The Charter takes the idea one step further by encouraging food processing agribusiness to complete the supply chain circle.

In a case study of Toronto completed by Pierre Filion, he claims that while transit and natural area conservation are successful at achieving their respective immediate objectives, they "do not modify metropolitan-wide relations between transportation and land use...in a fashion that is consistent with smart growth". Filion identifies that the largest obstacles are NIMBY reactions from the public and the limited finances from the public sector.

== Education ==
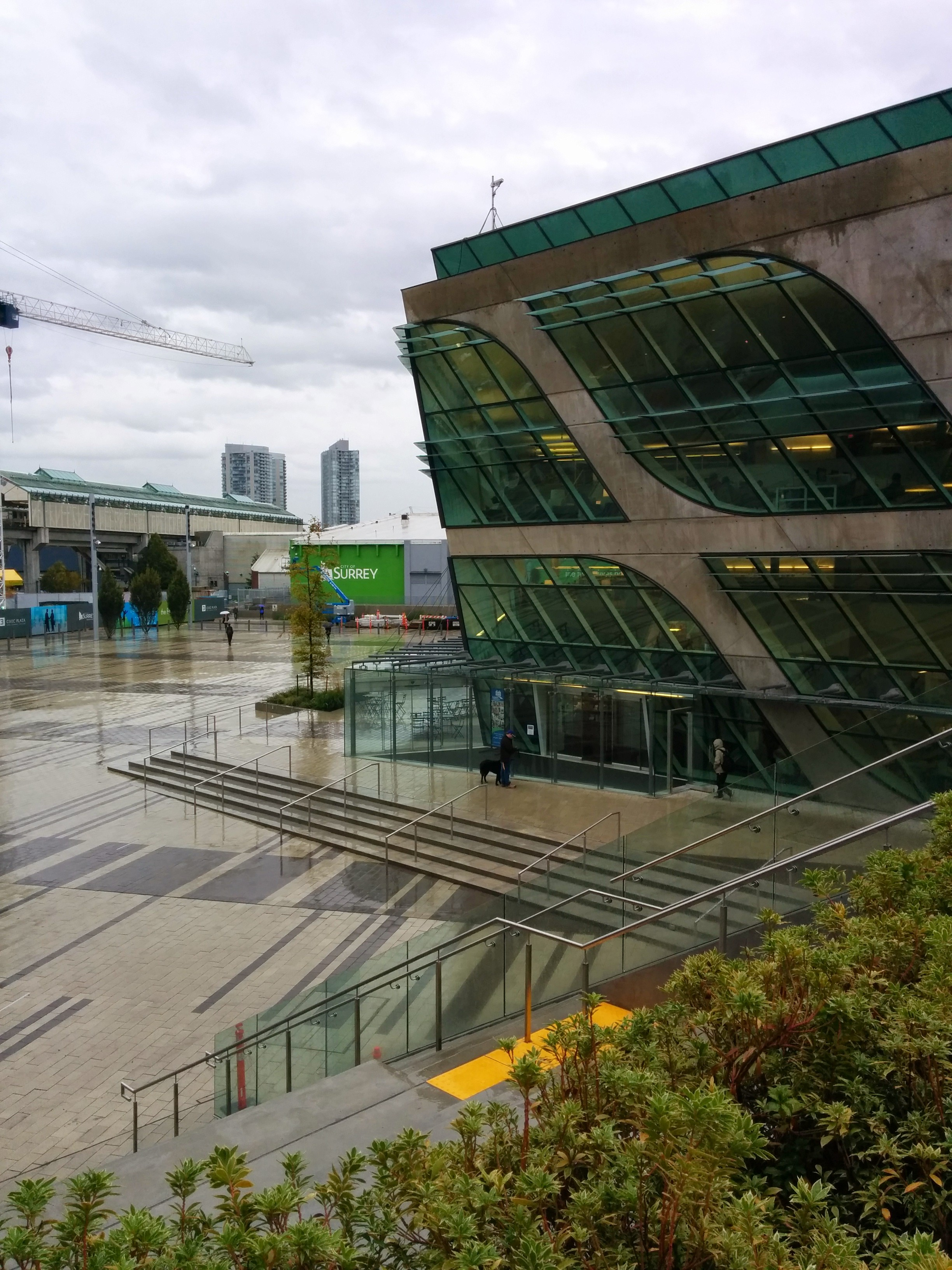
Surrey Central Library

Of the city's population over the age of 25, 23.7 percent hold a bachelor's degree or higher, slightly below the national average of 25.8 percent. 47.2 percent work in professional and managerial jobs, compared with the national average of 52.7 percent.

=== Schools ===
School District 36 Surrey oversees 100 public elementary and 21 public secondary schools in Surrey, making it the largest public school district in British Columbia, as well as the largest employer in Surrey. The Conseil scolaire francophone de la Colombie-Britannique operates one Francophone school in the city: École Gabrielle-Roy, which includes primary and secondary levels.

==== Old Anniedale School ====
The Old Anniedale School, built in 1891, is one of the earliest schools in Surrey. It was designed by the British Columbia Department of Lands and Works and constructed by Samuel Edge.

The school is associated with the development of the Tynehead and Anniedale neighbourhoods, first settled in the 1860s along the Coast Meridian Road (168th Street). Now located on the grounds of the modern Anniedale Elementary School, it hosts re-enactments of 19th-century lessons. It was saved from demolition in 1975 by the Anniedale Parent Teacher Association and renovated with government grants and community support. The building was restored again in 2019 by Gibraltar Construction.

=== Higher education ===
Surrey's local higher education needs are met by the two major research universities in the neighbouring municipalities of the Vancouver Metropolitan Area, the University of British Columbia and Simon Fraser University. In addition to several career, community, and junior colleges that offer vocational and polytechnic education throughout the city, trades and technical career education is mainly provided by colleges such as Kwantlen Polytechnic University in the Cloverdale and Newton area and by the British Columbia Institute of Technology in the neighbouring municipality of Burnaby.

Surrey is home to the third satellite campus of Simon Fraser University, the SFU Surrey Campus, which opened its doors in 2002, acting as a satellite campus operating as a public research university as well as providing further impetus for shaping the city. SFU took over the space and programming that was initially built for TechBC, a technical university proposed for south of the Fraser River by the NDP provincial government of the 1990s. SFU Surrey offers a number of programs, including TechOne and Explorations; first-year cohort options; and studies in Health Science, Applied Sciences, Natural Sciences, Liberal Arts, Business Administration, and Interactive Arts and Technology.

On November 28, 2022, Premier David Eby announced plans to launch a new medical school at Simon Fraser University's Surrey campus by September 2026. Eby announced a provincial earmark of $4.9 million in start-up financing to support the potential opening. The inauguration of the school in 2026 will mark the planned opening of Western Canada's first new medical school in 55 years.

Surrey is also the home of Kwantlen Polytechnic University, an undergraduate polytechnic university that opened its doors in the Newton Town Centre of Surrey in 1981 as a response to the growing need for expanded vocational training across the Fraser Valley. In 2008, Kwantlen Polytechnic University was conferred a university designation from the BC provincial government, upgrading itself from a community college to an official academic teaching institution that has become renowned in applied research.

Since then, Kwantlen has expanded to satellite campuses in Richmond, Langley, and a trades and technology centre in the Surrey neighbourhood of Cloverdale. The Kwantlen Surrey campus offers university transfer, career-training and academic-upgrading programs with focuses on science, business, arts, and health, including a publicly accessible wellness centre, while the Cloverdale campus offers vocational training through apprenticeships, citations, certificates, and diplomas for skilled trades and technical careers.

In November 2021, the University of British Columbia announced plans to establish a location in Surrey just north of Surrey Memorial Hospital.

Besides Kwantlen Polytechnic University, Surrey is also home to numerous community and junior colleges providing vocational education, including Brighton College, Sprott Shaw College, PACE Canada College, Pacific Link College, CDI College, Western Community College, Sterling College, Stenberg College, Academy of Learning, Surrey Community College, Discovery Community College and Vancouver Career College.

== Notable people ==
- Carolyn Arends, singer-songwriter and author
- Karan Aujla, singer, songwriter and rapper
- Arshdeep Bains, professional hockey player
- Harry Bains, politician
- Nuvraj Bassi, professional football player
- Jagrup Brar, politician
- Jean-Luc Bilodeau, actor
- Margaret Bridgman, politician
- Lisa Brokop, singer
- Laurent Brossoit, professional hockey goaltender
- Chuck Cadman, politician
- Dona Cadman, Member of Parliament and widow of Chuck Cadman
- Gulzar Singh Cheema, physician and politician
- Eleanor Collins, jazz singer, TV host and civic leader
- Ryan D'Arcy, neuroscientist researcher
- Narima dela Cruz, politician
- Baltej Singh Dhillon, first Royal Canadian Mounted Police officer allowed to wear a turban
- Ranj Dhaliwal, author
- Sukh Dhaliwal, politician
- Brenden Dillon, professional hockey player
- Emmalyn Estrada, singer, songwriter, actress and sister of Elise Estrada
- Elise Estrada, singer, songwriter, actress and sister of Emmalyn Estrada
- Kevin Falcon, politician
- Peter Fassbender, politician
- Colin Fraser, professional ice hockey player
- Curtis Fraser, professional ice hockey player
- Jennifer Gardiner, professional ice hockey player
- Gurmant Grewal, politician
- Nina Grewal, politician
- Scott Hannan, professional hockey player
- Dave Hayer, politician
- Kamal Heer, Punjabi singer
- Russ Hiebert, politician
- Jacob Hoggard, lead singer of Hedley
- Britt Irvin, actress, singer, voice-over artist
- Daniel Igali, 2000 Olympic gold medalist for freestyle wrestling
- Mark Janssens, professional hockey player
- Tristan Jarry, professional hockey goaltender
- Jujhar Khaira, professional hockey player
- Sydney Leroux, professional soccer player
- Adam Loewen, former professional baseball player
- Harbhajan Mann, Punjabi singer
- Alen Marcina, professional soccer player and coach
- Laura Mennell, actress
- Merkules, rapper Cole Stevenson
- Tyler Joe Miller, country singer, songwriter, and humanitarian
- Victoria Moors, gymnast at the 2012 Summer Olympics
- Gary Nylund, professional hockey player
- Shallon Olsen, Olympic artistic gymnast
- Missy Peregrym, actress and former fashion model
- Penny Priddy, politician
- Michael Rasmussen, NHL player for the Detroit Red Wings
- Paul Rodgers, vocalist with Free and Bad Company
- Gordon Rice, artist
- Jasbir Sandhu, politician
- Linus Sebastian, videographer, founder and chief vision officer of Linus Media Group
- Geroy Simon, professional football player
- Jinny Sims, politician
- Lauren Southern, internet personality, writer, and political activist
- Tony Stevens, country singer and songwriter
- Kalib Starnes, professional mixed martial artist
- Heather Stilwell, politician and activist
- John Tenta, professional wrestler nicknamed "Earthquake"
- Yasmin Ullah, Rohingya activist
- Aaron Voros, professional hockey player
- Chris and Patrick Vörös, professional wrestlers and social media personalities
- Manmohan Waris, Punjabi singer
- Joel Waterman, soccer player
- Nolan Watson, businessman, philanthropist, and humanitarian
- Dianne Watts, politician; first female Mayor of Surrey
- Parker Wotherspoon, professional ice hockey player
- Jessie Sunner, politician

== Affiliated cities and municipalities ==
Surrey has two sister cities:

Country	City	Date	Ref.
Japan	Kōtō	April 20, 1989	
China	Zhuhai	July 8, 1987	

Surrey also has six "friendship cities":

Country	City	Date
China	Ningbo	1999
South Korea	Dongjak	2000
China	Taicang	2004
India	Ludhiana	2005
India	Jalandhar	2005
China	Jincheng	2006

== See also ==
- List of tallest buildings in Surrey
