= Russian–American Telegraph =

1860s attempted telegraph line

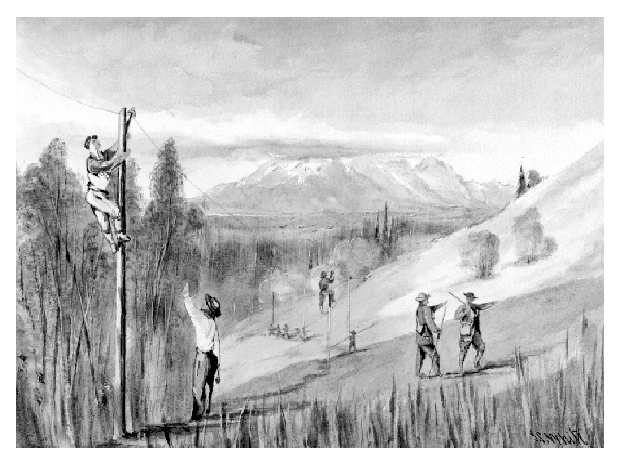
Painting of Men Working On the Collins Overland Telegraph Line, by John Clayton White

The Russian–American Telegraph, also known as the Western Union Telegraph Expedition and the Collins Overland Telegraph, was an attempt by the Western Union Telegraph Company from 1865 to 1867 to lay a telegraph line from San Francisco, California, to Moscow, Russia.

The route of the $3,000,000 undertaking (equivalent to $63.1 million today) was intended to travel from California via Oregon, Washington Territory, the Colony of British Columbia and Russian America, under the Bering Sea and cross the broad breadth of the Eurasian Continent to Moscow, where lines would communicate with the rest of Europe. It was proposed as a much longer alternative to the challenge of long, deep underwater cables in the Atlantic, having only to cross the comparatively narrow Bering Strait underwater between North America and Siberia.

Laying the cable across Siberia proved more difficult than expected. Meanwhile, Cyrus West Field's transatlantic cable was successfully completed, leading to the abandonment in 1867 of the trans-Russian effort. A Government of Canada historic plaque adds these specifics: "In 1867 ... construction ceased at Fort Stager at the confluence of the Kispyap and Skeena rivers. The section from New Westminster to the Cariboo was bought by the Canadian Government in 1880."

In spite of the project's economic failure, many regard aspects of the effort a success on the weight of various benefits the exploration brought to the regions that were traversed. To date, no entities have attempted a communications cable across the Bering Sea, with all extant submarine communications cables that travel westbound from North America following more southerly routes across much longer stretches of the North Pacific Ocean, connecting to Asia in Japan and then on to the Asian mainland.

== Rival plans ==
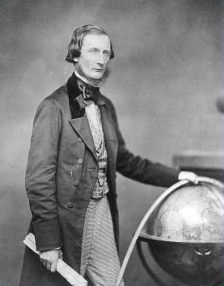
Cyrus West Field

By 1861 the Western Union Telegraph Company had linked the eastern United States by electric telegraph all the way to San Francisco. The challenge then remained to connect North America with the rest of the world.

Working to meet that challenge were two telegraph pioneers, one, Cyrus West Field, seeking to lay an undersea telegraph cable west to east across the Atlantic from North America, and the other, Perry Collins, proposing a west to east link going the opposite direction, overland from the west coast of North America across the Bering Strait and Sibera to Moscow.

Field's Atlantic Telegraph Company laid the first transatlantic cable across the Atlantic Ocean in 1858. However, it had broken three weeks afterwards and attempts to repair it had been unsuccessful.

Meanwhile, entrepreneur Perry Collins visited Russia and took note that it was making good progress extending its telegraph lines eastwards from Moscow over Siberia. Upon his return to the States, Collins approached Hiram Sibley, head of the Western Union Telegraph Company with the idea of an overland telegraph line that would run through the Northwestern states, the colony of British Columbia and Russian Alaska. Together, they worked on promoting the idea and obtained considerable support in the US, London and Russia.

== Preparations ==
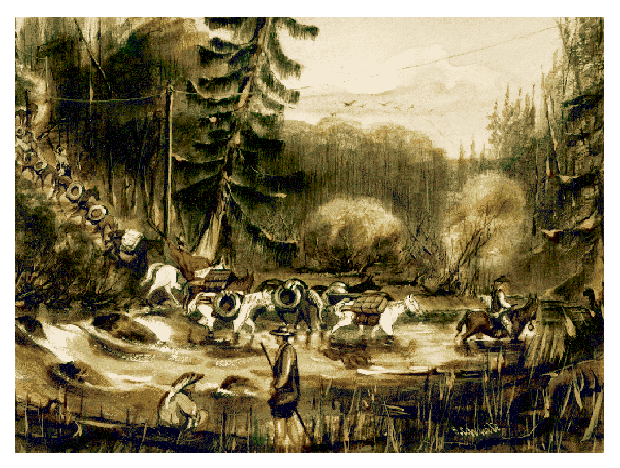
Painting of work crew on Collins Overland Telegraph

On July 1, 1864, the American president Abraham Lincoln granted Western Union a right of way from San Francisco to the British Columbia border and assigned them the steamship Saginaw from the US Navy. The George S. Wright and the Nightingale, a former slave ship, were also put into service, as well as a fleet of riverboats and schooners.

To supervise the construction, Collins chose Colonel Charles Bulkley, who had been the Superintendent of Military Telegraphs. Being an ex-military man, Bulkley divided the work crews into "working divisions" and an "Engineer Corps."

Edward Conway was made the head of the project's American route and British Columbia sections. Franklin Pope was assigned to Conway and given the responsibility for the exploring of British Columbia. The task of exploring Russian America went to the Smithsonian naturalist Robert Kennicott. In Siberia, the construction and exploration was under the charge of Russian nobleman Serge Abasa. Assigned to him were Collins Macrae, George Kennan, and J. A. Mahood.

Exploration and construction teams were divided into groups: one was in British Columbia, another worked around the Yukon River and Norton Sound with headquarters at St. Michael, Alaska, a third explored the area along the Amur River in Siberia, and a fourth group of about forty men was sent to Port Clarence to build the line that was to cross the Bering Strait to Siberia.

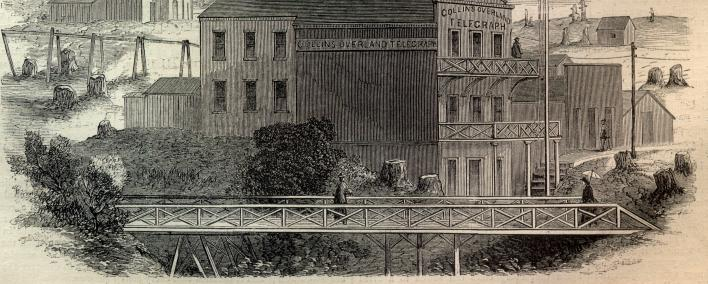
Collins Overland Telegraph Terminal at New Westminster, British Columbia

The Colony of British Columbia gave the project its full and enthusiastic support, allowing the materials for the line to be brought in free of duties and tolls. Chosen as the British Columbia terminus, New Westminster gloated over its triumph over its rival, Victoria, and it was predicted in the British Columbian newspaper that "New Westminster, traduced and dreaded by its jealous neighbor, will now be at the centre of all these great systems." The right of way for the telegraph line followed the shoreline west from the US border, then traversed the high ground of what is now White Rock and South Surrey to the Nicomekl River. From Mud Bay the telegraph line followed the Kennedy Trail northwest across Surrey and North Delta to the Fraser River.

At Brownsville, a cable was laid across the river to New Westminster. The surveying in British Columbia had started before the line reached New Westminster on March 21, 1865. Edward Conway had walked to Hope and was dismayed by the difficulty of the terrain. In response to Conway's concerns, the Colony of British Columbia agreed to build a road from New Westminster to Yale where it would meet the newly completed Cariboo Road. The telegraph company's only responsibility would be to string wires along it.

== Route through Russian America ==
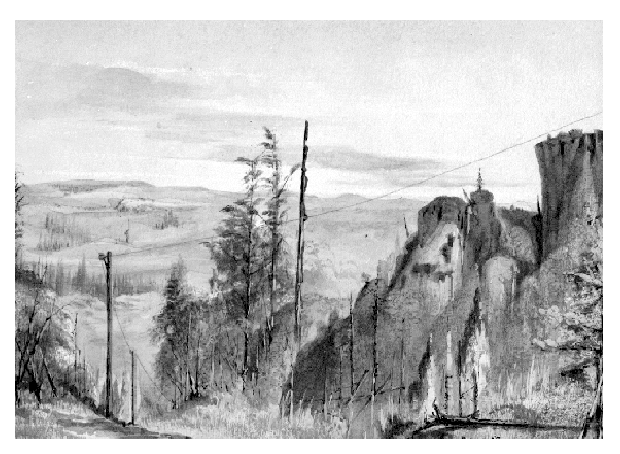
Collins Overland Telegraph Line

Work began in Russian America in 1865, but initially little progress was made. Contributing to this lack of success was the climate, the terrain, supply shortages and the late arrival of the construction teams. Nevertheless, the entire route through Russian America was surveyed by the fall of 1866. Rather than waiting until spring, as was the usual practice, construction began and continued through that winter.

Many of the Western Union workers were unaccustomed to severe northern winters, and working in frigid conditions made erecting the line a difficult experience. Fires had to be lit to thaw out the frozen ground before holes could be dug to place the telegraph poles. For transportation and to haul the supplies, the only option the work crews had was to use teams of sled dogs.

When the Atlantic cable was successfully completed and the first transatlantic message to England was sent in July 1866, the men in the Russian American division were not aware of it until a full year later.

By then telegraph stations had been built, thousands of poles were cut and distributed along the route, and over 45 mi (72 km) of line had been completed in Russian America. Despite the fact that so much progress had been made, in July 1867 the work was officially ceased.

== Route through British Columbia ==
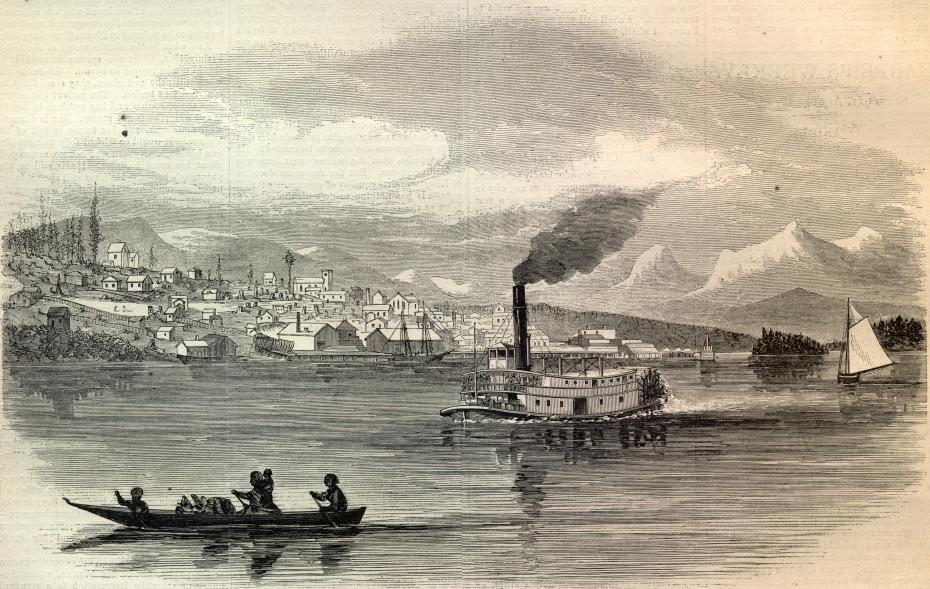
New Westminster, British Columbia in 1865

When that section of the line reached New Westminster, British Columbia, in the spring of 1865, the first message it carried was of the April 15 assassination of Abraham Lincoln.

In May 1865 construction began from New Westminster to Yale and then along the Cariboo Road and the Fraser River to Quesnel. Winter brought a halt to construction, but resumed in the spring with 150 men working northwest from Quesnel.

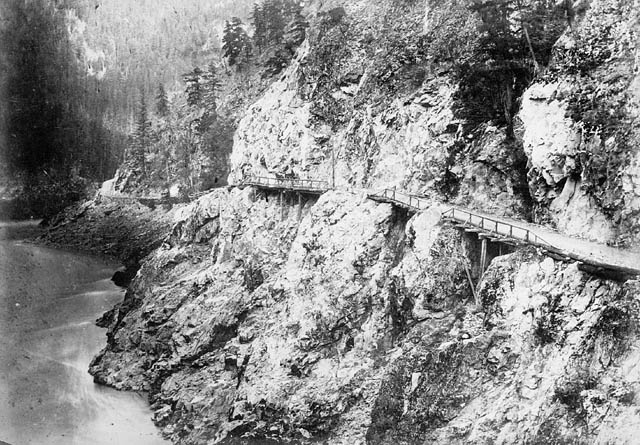
A section of the Cariboo Road

In 1866, the work progressed rapidly in that section, fifteen log telegraph cabins had been built and line had been strung 400 mi (640 km) from Quesnel, reaching the Kispiox and Bulkley Rivers. The company's sternwheeler, Mumford, traveled 110 mi (180 km) up the Skeena River from the Pacific Coast three times that season, successfully delivering 150 mi (240 km) of material for the telegraph line and 12,000 rations for its workers.

The line passed Fort Fraser and reached the Skeena River, creating the settlement of Hazelton when it was learned that Cyrus West Field had successfully laid the transatlantic cable on July 27.

In British Columbia, construction of the overland line was halted on February 27, 1867, as the whole project was now deemed obsolete.

Nevertheless, left behind in British Columbia was a usable telegraph system from New Westminster to Quesnel, which later would be run to the Cariboo Gold Rush town of Barkerville, and a trail that had been beat through what had largely been uncharted wilderness.

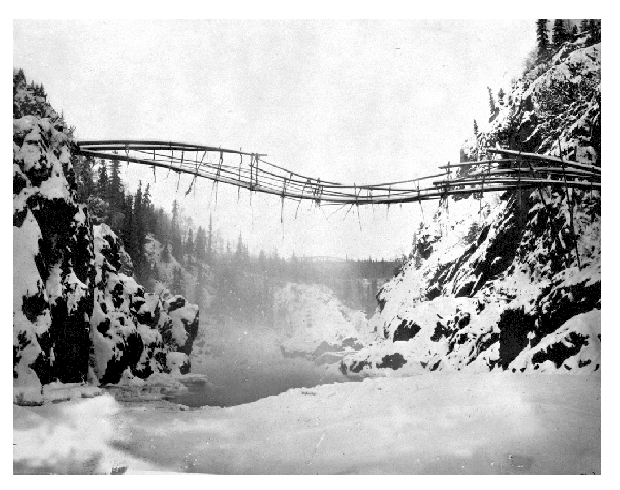
Hagwilget first bridge

In addition, the expedition left behind a vast store of supplies that were put to good use by some of the First Nations inhabitants. Near Hazelton, Colonel Bulkley had been impressed by the bridge the Hagwilgets had built across the Bulkley River, but was reluctant to let his work party cross it until it had been reinforced with cable.

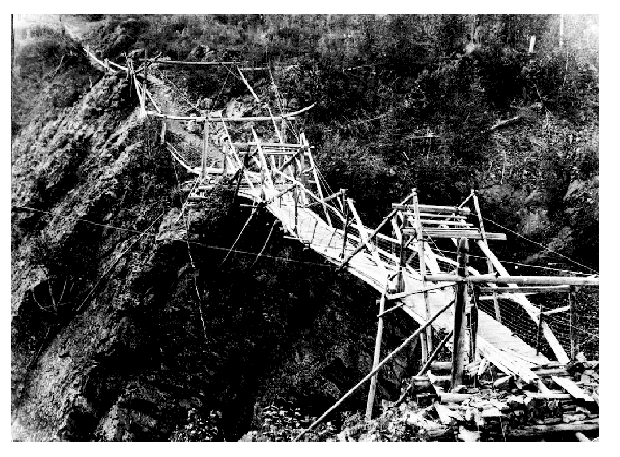
Hagwilget second bridge

After the project was abandoned, the Hagwilgets at Hazelton built a second bridge from cable that the company had left behind. Both bridges were considered marvels of engineering and were credited as being "one of the romances of bridge building."

== Legacy ==
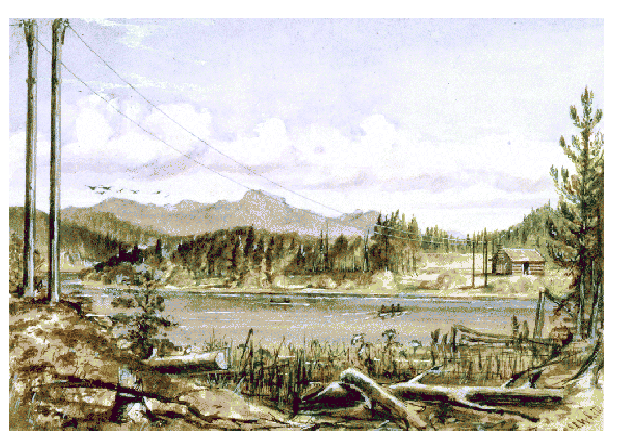
Painting of a Collins Overland Telegraph cabin

In the long run, the telegraph expedition, while an abject economic failure, provided a further means by which America was able to expand its Manifest Destiny beyond its national boundaries and may have precipitated the US purchase of Alaska. The expedition was responsible for the first examination of the flora, fauna and geology of Russian America and the members of the telegraph project were able to play a crucial role in the purchase of Alaska by providing useful valuable data on the territory.

The Colony of British Columbia meanwhile could further explore, colonize and communicate with its northern landscapes beyond what had been done by the Hudson's Bay Company.

Many of the towns in Northwestern British Columbia can trace their initial European settlement back to the Collins Overland Telegraph. Some examples of these are Hazelton, Burns Lake, Telkwa and Telegraph Creek.

The expedition also laid a foundation for the construction of the Yukon Telegraph line which was built from Ashcroft to Telegraph Creek and beyond to Dawson City, Yukon in 1901.

Portions of the telegraph route became part of the Ashcroft trail used by gold seekers during the Klondike gold rush. Of all the trails used by the stampeders the Ashcroft was among the harshest. Of the over fifteen hundred men and three thousand horses left Ashcroft, British Columbia, in the spring of 1898, only six men and no horses reached the goldfields.

Walter R. Hamilton was among those who completed the route. In his book The Yukon Story he describes the state of the trail thirty years after it was abandoned

All evidence of the right-of-way and poles were gone, but in a few instances we found pieces of old telegraph wire imbedded several inches in the spruce, jack-pine and poplar trees that had long-since grown up and over the wires that touched them. I found one of the old green glass insulators still attached to a galvanized wire. I kept it as a souvenir but lost it later with a camera and some clothing when a scow was nearly overturned on Lake Laberge.

== Places named for the expedition or its members ==
- Mount Pope in British Columbia was named for Franklin Pope, who was the assistant engineer and chief of explorations, responsible for surveying the 1,500 miles section from New Westminster to the Yukon River.

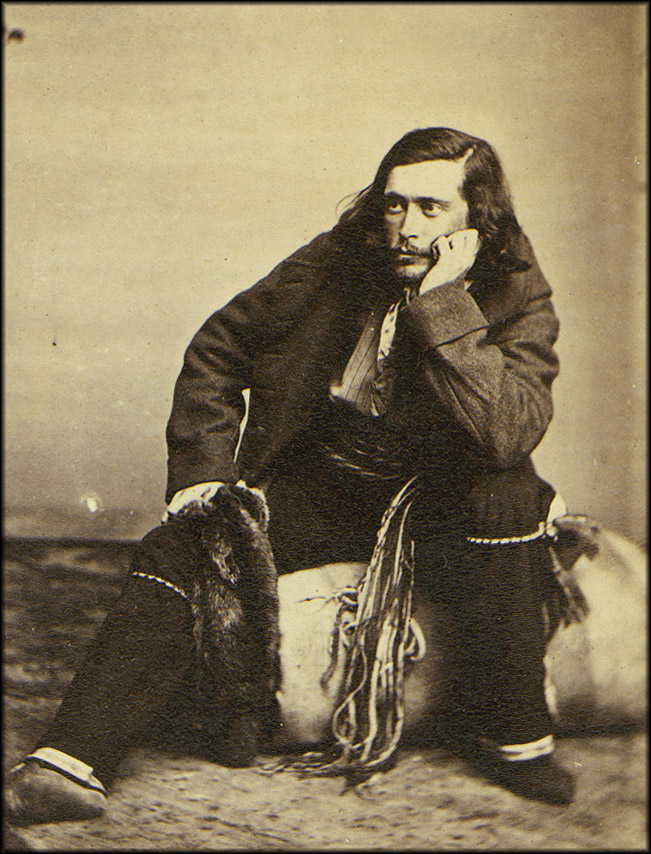
Robert Kennicott

- Kennecott, Alaska and the Kennicott Glacier are named for the expedition's naturalist, Robert Kennicott. Although Kennicott died on the expedition, on May 13, 1866, his work was publicized by W. H. Dall, another naturalist hired by Robert Kennicott. This publication and the publicity about Kennicott's death at the age of thirty-one helped Secretary of State William H. Seward convince Congress to purchase Alaska from Russia in 1867.
- The Bulkley River, Bulkley Valley, Bulkley Mountains (now named the Bulkley Ranges) and the settlement of Bulkley House in British Columbia are named after Colonel Charles Bulkley. The name of the Bulkley-Nechako Regional District, a regional government in that area, is derived from the geographic names.
- Burns Lake was named after Michael Byrnes, scout for the Collins Overland Telegraph scheme who explored the route from Fort Fraser to Skeena Forks (Hazelton, BC)
- Decker Lake was named after Stephen Decker, construction foreman in British Columbia.
- The Telegraph Range in the Ootsa Lake area is one of several landforms whose name is associated with the project

== Books and memoirs written about the expedition ==
Several major works are available documenting the expedition. The scientific travelogue by Smithsonian scientist W. H. Dall is perhaps the most referenced, while an English travelogue by Frederick Whymper provides additional information. Among personal accounts members of the expedition are a diary of Franklin Pope.

George Kennan and Richard Bush both wrote of the difficulties they encountered during the expedition. Kennan would later become notable for influencing American opinion of the Russian Empire. Originally very much for Russian settlement of the far East, on visiting the exile camps in the 1880s he changed his mind and later wrote Tent Life in Siberia: Adventures Among the Koryaks and Other Tribes in Kamchatka and Northern Asia. Richard Bush, aiming to emulate Kennan's success, wrote "Reindeer, Dogs and Snowshoes".

All documents and books relating to the expedition are of historical value, not only from a travel and discovery perspective but also from a cultural studies standpoint. The ethnocentric descriptions of aboriginal peoples in the places now known as British Columbia, Yukon Territory and Alaska, as well as the general region of Eastern Siberia, typify those attitudes of the time. Telegraph records provide evidence for native land claims such as those of the Gitxsan Nation of northern British Columbia. Dall's records have helped locate Smithsonian exhibits returned to their original native domiciles.
