= PACE Canada College =

Canadian post-secondary college in British Columbia

- Motto: To Educate. To Empower. To Integrate.
- Type: Progressive Inter-cultural Community Services Society
- Established: 2010; 15 years ago

PACE (PICS Asia-Pacific College Education) Canada College is a post-secondary academic institution located in Surrey, British Columbia. Founded in 2010, it offers 30 different courses and programs to both domestic and international students. PACE Canada College was made as a subsidiary of the Progressive Inter-cultural Community Services (PICS) Society, which provides programs and services that assist new immigrants, seniors, farm workers, women and youth.

The college is registered with the PCTIA.

== Programs and Courses ==
Programs and courses offered at PACE Canada College include:

- Business Management
- Accounting
- Programming and Technology
- Database Administration
- Health Care
- Career and Settlement Counselling
- Electrical Engineering
- Hospitality Management
- Trade

== Additional Services ==
- PACE Canada College offers free English preparation and career counselling services.
