= Perry Collins =

Perry McDonough Collins (1813–1900) was the visionary behind the Russian-American Telegraph of 1865–1867. The failed venture aimed to connect America to Europe by telegraph via the Bering Strait.

== The early years ==
Born in Hyde Park, New York, in 1813, he was named after American naval heroes, Commodores Oliver Hazard Perry, Matthew Perry (naval officer) and Thomas MacDonough. Little is known of his early life, but in his early thirties he left his unrewarding law office job and routine east coast lifestyle. In 1846, he headed south to New Orleans. There he met manifest destiny evangelists William McKendree Gwin and Robert J Walker who fervently believed that America should dominate the North American continent. When news of the California gold rush reached New Orleans, Gwin went west with the aim of becoming California's first (Democratic) senator. Collins followed on deciding to mine not gold but the miners. He tried his hand as a lawyer in Sonora. Records reveal that he took part in seven cases, lost six and won the other by default. He turned to business and helped start the American Russian Commercial Company with Gwin. This started with the opportunistic aim of shipping ice from the Arctic to San Francisco.

When Gwin became one of California's first two senators, Collins had a direct line to Washington. He planned to use it to support new and exotic schemes looking beyond the Pacific and into Asia. At that time, Russia had expanded towards the Asian side of the Pacific. In 1847, the appointed Governor, Nikolai Muraviev, was determined to expand Russian trade and fixed on the Amur River, its boundary with China, as the key geostrategic location.

Gwin together with William Seward looked on this Russian eastern expansion and convinced themselves that it paralleled America's expansion westward. Financing a survey, Collins, already a fan of Ferdinand von Wrangel read it eagerly on his return. He later wrote "I had already fixed in my own mind upon the river Amoor as the destined channel by which American commercial enterprise was to penetrate the obscure depths of Northern Asia, and open a new world to trade and civilization."

== In Russia ==
With the help of Gwin and Russian Ambassador Edward de Stoekl, he received an audience with President Franklin Pierce in 1856 and impressed. As the new Commercial Agent for the Amur, he set sail toward St Petersburg. There, he met Muraviev before travelling to Moscow where he attended the coronation of Tsar Alexander II. On receipt of the relevant permits, he set out to Irkutsk on the post road. By all accounts, he was impressed by Russia and charmed everyone he met with his enthusiasm for his hosts and their country. After Irkutsk, he met up with Muraviev again and headed to the southern border town of Kyakhta where many drunken evenings ensued. He crossed over the border to the Chinese frontier town of Maimattschin and related in great detail the Mongol New Year celebration of the Feast of the Lanterns.

The following spring, he headed east to Chita (Chita, Russia) where he began his river journey on the Ingoda River, a tributary of the Amur. All the while, he was thinking about business. As Vilhjalmur Stefansson noted, "Collins the nineteenth-century Marco Polo, and Collins the poet of coal, timber, opals, sables and steamships, railroads and rubies were never allowed to interfere with Collins, the strict man of business."

On July 10, he finally reached Nikolayevsk-na-Amure. He was impressed. He saw this as the center of trade with eastern Siberia, Kamchatka, America, Japan and China. His round the world trip left him convinced that the Russians and Americans had much to achieve together.

== The origins of Russian American Telegraph ==
Arriving back in America, he decided on a Pacific network of railroads and steamships as being the means to make his fortune and develop western trade. Returning briefly to St Petersburg in 1858, he was warned his scheme was premature. Instead and coincident with the failure of the telegraph line across the Atlantic, he proposed an intercontinental telegraph line. This line would run through either Canada or the western United States, into British Columbia, the northern British territories, into Russian America (Alaska), over the Bering Strait to Siberia and then along the Amur to Irkutsh and thence Europe. Success of such a scheme, Collins anticipated, would deliver all intercontinental communication into the hands of the Americans.

In 1859, he approached Hiram Sibley, head of the Western Union Telegraph Company and promoter of an intercontinental line across the United States. Together, they worked on promoting this overland international line. Indeed, they obtained some considerable support. As California senator Milton Latham suggested in 1861, through the line "we hold the ball of the earth in our hand, and wind upon it a network of living and thinking wire till the whole is held together and bound with the same wishes, projects and interests."

The Civil War intervened, but in 1863 Collins returned to Russia to represent the scheme. He obtained approval. He then met Lord Palmerston in London to discuss the line in British Columbia and the British Northern Territories. On his side was Paul Reuter, then head of Reuters news agency. Making a reasonable though not entirely perfect deal, he returned to Washington, reissued his book on his Russian journey down the Amur and was now able to take a back seat. Sibley recommended to the Western Union board that they buy all of Collins' rights and set up a subsidiary company. He received $100,000 and one tenth of the stock in the new Western Union Extension Company. The remaining stock was snapped up. With US Government support finalized through a bill signed by Abraham Lincoln and the British Columbia colonial assembly ratifying what had been agreed with London earlier, thus began the Russian American Telegraph (known in British Columbia as the Collins Overland Telegraph).

== Later life ==
In 1876 Collins moved to New York City, where he took residence in the St. Denis Hotel in Lower Manhattan, where he lived for nearly 25 years. He left a considerable fortune when he died there on January 18, 1900. 17 years later his niece bequeathed $550,000 from that estate for a scholarships at New York University.

== Bibliography ==
A Voyage Down the Amoor; D Appleton & Company, NY, 1860
