= Montreal Holocaust Museum =

- Musée de l'Holocauste Montréal

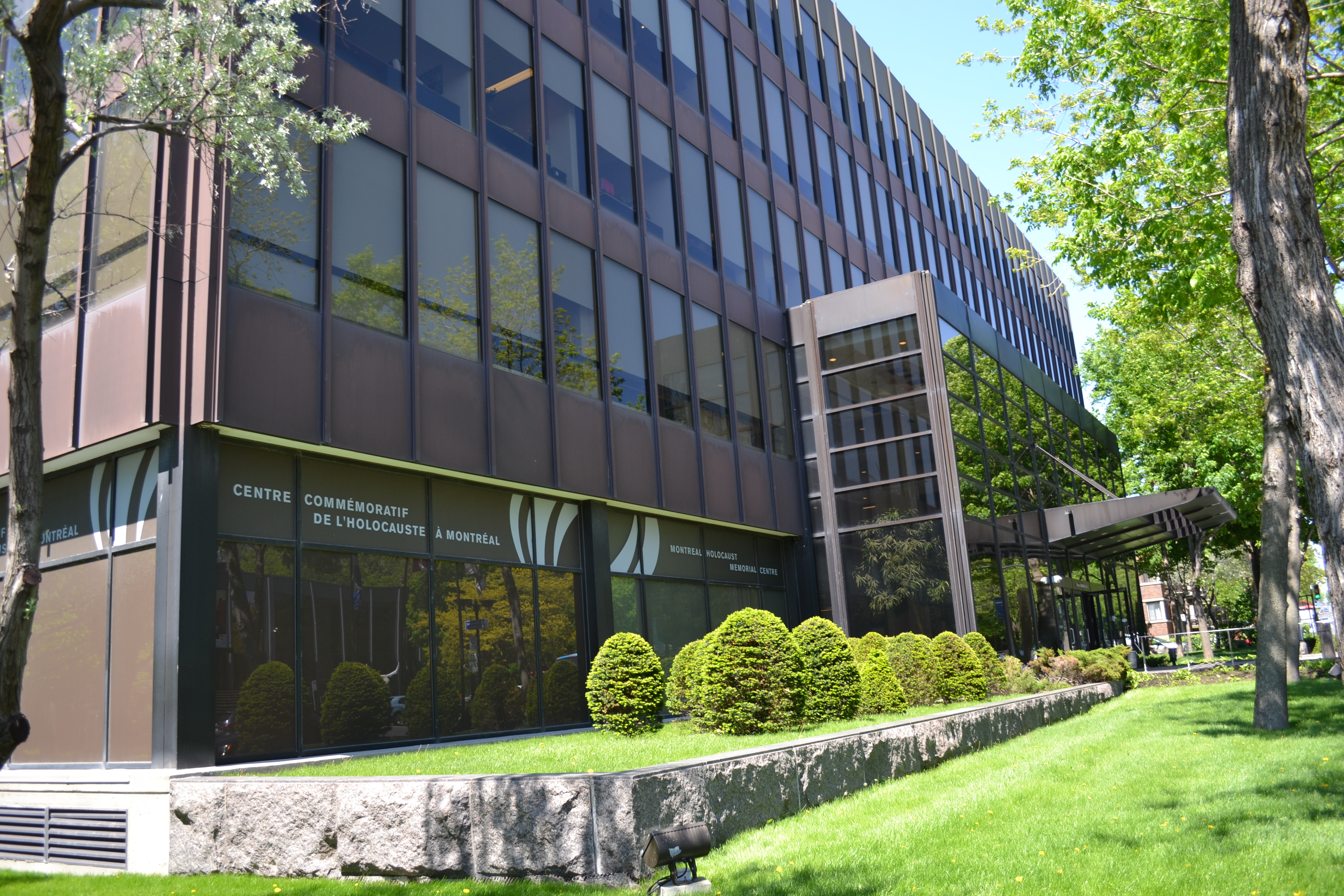
- Montreal Holocaust Museum

- Location within Montreal
- Former name: Montreal Holocaust Memorial Centre; Centre commémoratif de l’Holocauste à Montréal
- Established: 1979
- Location: 5151, chemin de la Côte-Sainte-Catherine; Montreal, Quebec, Canada; H3W 1M6
- Coordinates: 45.4891°N 73.6365°W
- Type: Holocaust history museum
- Executive director: Daniel Amar
- Public transit access: Côte-Sainte-Catherine
- Website: Museeholocauste.ca

The Montreal Holocaust Museum (French: Musée de l'Holocauste Montréal) is a museum located in Montreal, Quebec, Canada. It is dedicated to educating people of all ages and backgrounds about the Holocaust, while sensitizing the public to the universal perils of antisemitism, racism, hate and indifference. Through the museum, its commemorative programs and educational initiatives, it aims to promote respect for diversity and the sanctity of human life. The Museum was founded in 1979 as the Montreal Holocaust Memorial Centre (French: Centre commémoratif de l’Holocauste à Montréal) and is Canada's first and only recognized Holocaust museum.

== History ==
The Montreal Holocaust Memorial Centre was founded in 1979 by members of the Association of Survivors of Nazi Oppression and young members of the Montreal Jewish community, and led by Steven Cummings.

It opened in its current location in the Allied Jewish Community Services building (now Federation CJA). The Centre served as a museum with a permanent exhibition and a memorial centre.

After World War II, Jewish immigrants settled in Montreal, making it the third largest population of Holocaust survivors in the world in proportion to its inhabitants after Israel and New York. The Centre became distinguished for its collection featuring artefacts and testimonies primarily from local survivors.

In 2003, the Centre underwent a renovation funded by government grants and private and corporate donations to expand and improve the existing collection. The centre launched the current permanent exhibit, "To Learn, To Feel, To Remember".

In 2010, director Carl Leblanc released the documentary film The Heart of Auschwitz, based on the heart-shaped book exhibited in the museum. The film retraces the book's history and the stories of the women who signed it. He later published Artefact in 2012, a fictional story inspired by the book.

In 2013, a free app was developed for electronic devices and smartphones on Apple and Android platforms. The app can be used in the permanent exhibition and as an educational tool for classrooms unable to visit the museum. It provides additional in-depth information on the subjects and objects displayed in the exhibit. Interactive touch-screens featuring maps and timelines were added in 2014 to modernize the exhibit.

In 2016, the centre was renamed the Montreal Holocaust Museum to reinforce its openness to the public and its mandate as the only Holocaust museum in Canada.

In March 2024, a group of pro-Palestinian protestors blocked access to the building, protesting an event where Israeli army reservists were speaking.

== Collection ==
The majority of the Museum's collection is composed of artefacts donated by local Holocaust survivors and their descendants.

To date, the museum's collection of artefacts numbers over 12,900 objects relating to life before, during and after the Holocaust, with 85% of the collection digitized. Over 100 key artefacts from the collection are displayed on the museum's website and the Artefacts Canada database. Over 4,000 artefacts are accessible digitally through the Canadian Jewish Heritage Network. Notable objects in the collection include an urn containing ashes from Auschwitz-Birkenau that is on permanent display in the museum's commemoration room, and the Heart from Auschwitz, a heart-shaped book with birthday wishes made by a group of young women in Auschwitz. The Heart was given to a woman named Fania Fainer, who smuggled it out of the concentration camp and eventually donated the book to the museum.

The museum also holds the largest oral history collection of Holocaust survivors’ stories in Canada. The museum's oral history program started in 1994. Since then the museum has recorded and archived over 800 oral histories, and continues to do so. In 2016, it participated in the Canada Collection oral history project that consolidated more than 1,250 testimonies from Holocaust survivors across Canada and preserved them in the USC Shoah Foundation Visual History Archive.

== Exhibitions ==
=== Permanent Exhibition ===
To Learn, To Feel, To Remember is the current permanent exhibition that went on display with the renovation in 2003. When it launched it featured 418 artifacts, 372 photographs and 10 video stations. It is designed to reflect Jewish culture and history in Europe before the war, the destruction of Jewish life during the Nazi era and the Holocaust, and how the survivors who immigrated to Montreal and Canada rebuilt their lives.

=== Travelling exhibitions ===
United Against Genocide: Understand, Question, Prevent aims to educate the public about genocide, its implications and how to prevent it. The exhibit examines the similarities and differences between the Armenian genocide, Cambodian Genocide, the Genocide of Tutsis in Rwanda and the Holocaust through testimonies, interviews and archives.

"And In 1948, I Came to Canada": The Holocaust in Six Dates focuses on six key dates of the Holocaust, from the Nazi party's rise to power to the liberation of concentration camps. There is also an emphasis on Canada's reaction to the Holocaust and survivors’ lives in Canada. The exhibition uses artefacts from the museum's collection and testimonies from Montreal survivors.

=== Virtual exhibitions ===
The museum has three virtual exhibitions available for free online.

Building New Lives follows the stories of Jewish refugees in Canada after World War II and their contributions to society as they made communities in Canada their home.

United Against Genocide: Understand, Question, Prevent explores the similarities and differences between genocides to educate about its implications and prevention.

Holocaust Life Stories features biographies and video testimonies from Holocaust survivors.

== Programs ==
Every year the Museum organizes a number of events open to the public including annual Yom Hashoah and Kristallnacht commemorations attended by survivors, members of the Jewish community and dignitaries. It also commemorates the Roma Genocide and International Holocaust Remembrance Day.

The Roma Genocide commemoration was first held in 2016 in partnership with Romanipe, a local non-profit that combats prejudice against Roma and advocates for Canada to recognize the Genocide of Roma and Sinti.

The museum also organizes events for the public that educate about the Holocaust and current human rights issues with guest speakers, films, workshops and Holocaust survivor testimonies. Notable guests include Yasmin Ullah.

== Education and resources ==
The Museum develops a number of educational resources for teachers on the Holocaust and human rights. Pedagogical tools, such as A Brief History of Antisemitism in Canada, The Heart From Auschwitz, and Hana’s Suitcase are produced in English and French and available for free on its website.

The museum also organizes a biennial conference to assist and train educators in teaching about the Holocaust and human rights. In 2017, the Museum received a grant from the Canadian government's Inter-Action fund for the Beyond the Walls of the Montreal Holocaust Museum project. The project, in conjunction with teacher's associations, universities, Holocaust education centres, Jewish Federations and the Canadian Museum for Human Rights, provides educators in various provinces with tools to teach about the Holocaust, genocide and human rights.

== Public positions ==
Since 2012, the Museum has taken public positions in order to take a stand on issues related to the history of the Holocaust and human rights of concern to Canadian citizens. It issues statements, organizes events and maintains a social media presence in order to promote diversity and public awareness by bridging the gap between the past and the present.

The Museum issued statements denouncing Quebec's Bills 60 and 62 on the grounds of racism and prejudice because they reinforced prejudices and alienated minority groups.

Working with human rights organizations and minority groups is another way the museum addresses current issues. It has taken an active role in advocating and supporting refugee rights through statements and events.

== Affiliations ==
The museum is affiliated with: Federation CJA, CMA, CHIN, VMC, SMQ, Musées Montréal, IHRA and AHO.

== See also ==
- Antisemitism in Canada
- Museum of Jewish Montreal
- National Holocaust Monument
- List of Holocaust memorials and museums
