= Yasmin Ullah =

Rohingya poet and human rights activist

- Ullah in 2024
- Born: 1992 (age 33–34); Rakhine State, Myanmar
- Occupations: Poet, human rights activist
- Organization: Executive Director of the Rohingya Maìyafuìnor Collaborative Network

Yasmin Ullah (born 1992) is a Rohingya and Canadian poet and activist. She heads the Rohingya Maiyafuinor Collaborative Network, and is a poet on Rohingya issues. She is also known for filing a genocide case against Myanmar's president Min Aung Hlaing in Jakarta.

== Biography ==
She was born in 1992 in the Rakhine State. At age 3, her family fled Myanmar to Thailand, where she spent 16 years. She lived under a fake identity to go to school and has stated her residence there was "almost illegal". In 2011, at age 19, she moved to British Columbia. She became a Canadian citizen in 2016.

Two years later, she entered university, seeking to become a medical professional, but language hurdles interfered. She worked as a receptionist and assistant in a dental office and left school. In 2017, after a military crackdown on Rohingya in Myanmar, she fundraised, before returning to school to study political science and sociology.

She has since worked as an activist for Rohingya affairs, serving as a former president of the Rohingya Human Rights Network, consulting for the Montreal Holocaust Museum and the Canadian Museum for Human Rights, and speaking for the Canadian legislature. She serves as executive director of the Rohingya Maiyafuinor Collaborative Network, and was a United Nations Fellow in 2023. She attended The Gambia v. Myanmar.

She has also opposed what she claims to be misinformation about Rohingya people, including in Malaysia. She has called for the United Nations to call the Rohingya genocide a genocide, not ethnic cleansing. She has also worked on more accessible mosques to people with special needs, and has called for an end to misogyny.

In 2026, she filed a genocide lawsuit against Burmese president Min Aung Hlaing in Indonesia under the country's universal jurisdiction rules. She stated that she wants to "face Min Aung Hliang in court and actually get him to face the victims" of what has been alleged to be a genocide.

Ullah is also a poet and writer: two of her poems were published in the 2019 anthology I am a Rohingya, and were described as "purposefully direct" by The Kenyon Review. She is the author of children's book Hafsa and the Magical Ring.
