= Kennedy Trail =

Trail in British Columbia, Canada

The Kennedy Trail was the first settler built trail in the Lower Mainland of British Columbia, Canada. James Kennedy first proposed "a trail from some point opposite New Westminster, across to some other point near to Semiahmoo Bay" in a letter written to Governor James Douglas in June 1860. He said "it would be the cause of speedy settlement of the land". In January 1861 Kennedy signed a contract to build the trail with the Chief Commissioner of Lands and Works, Colonel Richard Clement Moody.

The trail started on Kennedy's land pre-emption on the south shore of the Fraser River opposite New Westminster in what is now the Annieville area of North Delta. It followed the high ground across North Delta into Surrey towards Mud Bay. The main trail reached the flats at Mud Bay near Colebrook. A branch trail crossed southeast through Panorama Ridge, ending at the base of Woodward Hill, in the natural pasture land next to the Serpentine River. In 1865 the Kennedy Trail became a major part of route used to bring the first telegraph line to New Westminster from San Francisco. It was known by a number of different names over the years, including Telegraph Trail and Mud Bay Trail.

The Kennedy Trail and the survey of it done by the Royal Engineers were completed in August 1861. That same month the trail was included on a map issued by Colonel Moody to show the agricultural potential in the lower Fraser Valley.^{2} In December 1864 William McColl submitted a report on the proposed route for the telegraph line to New Westminster. It includes a map showing that the telegraph line would follow "Kennedy's Trail" from Mud Bay to the Fraser River.^{3} Maps produced during the construction of the Semiahmoo Trail in 1873 also show the Kennedy ("Mud Bay") Trail.^{4}

== Notes ==
1.Other early settler built trails include the 1862 North Arm Trail and the 1873 Semiahmoo Trail.
2.A portion of this map is shown as Map 47 on page 28 of the Historical Atlas of Vancouver and the Lower Fraser Valley by Derek Hayes, 2005, ISBN 1-55365-107-3.
3.A portion of this map is shown as Map 61 on page 34 of the Historical Atlas of Vancouver and the Lower Fraser Valley by Derek Hayes.
4.Portions of an almost identical map are shown on pages 41 and 42 of The Semiahmoo Trail: Myths Makers Memories by Ron Dowle, Surrey Historical Society, 1998.
