= North Vancouver Wolf Pack =

- City: North Vancouver
- League: Pacific Junior Hockey League
- Conference: Tom Shaw
- Founded: 2008
- Home arena: Harry Jerome Arena
- Colours: Blue; Silver
- CEO: Dean Samson
- General manager: Matt Samson
- Head coach: Matt Samson
- Website: northvanwolfpack.com

Franchise history
- 2008–11: Squamish Wolf Pack
- 2011–present: North Vancouver Wolf Pack

The North Vancouver Wolf Pack is a junior ice hockey team based in North Vancouver, British Columbia. They are members of the Tom Shaw Conference of the Pacific Junior Hockey League (PJHL). The Wolf Pack play their home games at Harry Jerome Arena in North Vancouver.

== History ==
The team was founded in 2008 in Squamish, British Columbia as the Squamish Wolf Pack until relocating to North Vancouver in 2011.

In the 2013–14 the team earned the most points and had their highest placing (2nd, Tom Shaw) in their division and earned their first playoff series win.

The 2014–2015 season marked the best season in franchise history winning the PJHL Division Championship beating Richmond Sockeyes by 1 point for 1st in league and in Harold Britain Conference.

In 2018 the team won its second league championship.

In 2019–20 the Wolf Pack became the first team in PJHL history to reach 40 wins in a single season.

In 2025, the league announced plans to promote the Chilliwack Jets, Coastal Tsunami, Delta Ice Hawks, Grandview Steelers, Langley Trappers, Richmond Sockeyes and Ridge Meadows Flames to a new Tier 1 division beginning in the 2025–26 season. Under the plan, the Abbotsford Pilots, Aldergrove Ironmen, Mission City Outlaws, North Vancouver Wolf Pack, Port Coquitlam Trailblazers, Port Moody Panthers, Surrey Knights and White Rock Whalers would remain as Tier 2, as well as a planned expansion team to be based in Cloverdale. However, when the plan was put to the franchise owners for a vote, it failed to pass by the required two-thirds majority, with 8 members voting for and 7 voting against. The vote was divided between the franchises that had been selected for promotion, who voted in favour of the motion, and those not selected for promotion, who voted against it.

== Season-by-season record ==
Note: GP = Games played, W = Wins, L = Losses, T = Ties, OTL = Overtime Losses, Pts = Points, GF = Goals for, GA = Goals against

Season	GP	W	L	T	OTL	Pts	GF	GA	Finish	Playoffs
Squamish Wolf Pack
2008–09	44	14	30	0	4	32	117	237	5th, Tom Shaw	Did not qualify
2009–10	48	16	26	0	6	38	164	212	5th, Tom Shaw	Did not qualify
2010–11	46	6	36	0	4	16	122	251	5th, Tom Shaw	Did not qualify
North Vancouver Wolf Pack
2011–12	44	20	21	2	1	43	141	176	4th, Tom Shaw	Lost Div. SemiFinals, 1–4 (Sockeyes)
2012–13	44	24	18	1	1	50	155	146	3rd, Tom Shaw	Lost Div. SemiFinals, 0–4 (Ice Hawks)
2013–14	44	26	14	2	2	56	161	121	2nd, Tom Shaw	Won Div. SemiFinals, 4–2 (Ice Hawks); Lost Div. Finals, 0–4 (Sockeyes)
2014–15	44	32	9	1	2	67	203	131	1st, Tom Shaw	Won Div. SemiFinals, 4–0 (Ice Hawks); Won Div. Finals, 4–1 (Steelers); Won PJHL Finals, 4–2 (Outlaws)
2015–16	44	32	9	0	3	67	224	130	1st, Tom Shaw	Lost Div. SemiFinals, 2–4 (Ice Hawks)
2016–17	44	17	24	1	2	37	133	153	4th, Tom Shaw	Lost Div. SemiFinals, 4–1 (Ice Hawks)
2017–18	44	27	14	0	3	57	134	124	3rd of 5, Tom Shaw	Lost Div. SemiFinals, 1–4 (Sockeyes)
2018–19	44	34	9	0	1	69	203	93	1st of 6, Tom Shaw; 1st of 12 PHJL	Won Quarterfinals, 4–1 (Flames); Won Semifinals 4–1 (Steelers); Won PJHL Finals, 4–0 (Trappers); Advance to Cyclone Taylor Cup
2019–20	44	40	3	0	1	81	260	91	1st of 6, Tom Shaw; 1st of 12 PHJL	Won Quarterfinals, 4–1 (Whalers); Won Semifinals 4–0 (Steelers); PJHL Finals Cancelled due to COVID-19 Virus
2020–21	Season lost to COVID-19 pandemic									
2021–22	44	31	5	1	5	68	175	110	1st of 6, Tom Shaw; 2nd of 13 PHJL	Lost Quarterfinals, 2–4 (Whalers)
2022–23	48	26	19	2	1	55	181	180	5th of 6, Tom Shaw; 8th of 13 PHJL	Lost Quarterfinals, 2–4 (Steelers)
2023–24	48	29	16	2	1	61	200	164	3rd of 7, Tom Shaw; 4th of 14 PHJL	Lost Quarterfinals, 0–4 (Ice Hawks)
2024–25	48	28	17	2	1	59	263	191	4th of 8, Tom Shaw; 4th of 14 PHJL	Lost Survivor Series, 0–2 (Trailblazers)

== Cyclone Taylor Cup ==
British Columbia Jr B Provincial Championships

Season	Round Robin	Record	Standing	SemiFinal	Bronze Medal Game	Gold Medal Game
2015 **	L, Campbell River 3–6; OTL, Mission City 6–7; OTL, Kimberley 4–5	0–1–2	4th of 4	n/a	L, Mission City 0–7	n/a
2019	tbd, Campbell River 0–0 tbd, KIJHL rep 0–0 tbd, Victoria 0–0	0-0-0	??? of 4	tbd	tbd	tbd

- 2015 Mission City host & Wolfpack qualify as PJHL Champions.
