= White Rock Whalers =

Ice hockey team in British Columbia, Canada

- City: White Rock, British Columbia
- League: Pacific Junior Hockey League
- Conference: Tom Shaw
- Founded: 2018
- Home arena: Centennial Arena
- Colours: Green, Blue, White
- Head coach: David Rutherford
- Website: whiterockwhalers.ca

Championships
- League champions: 1

The White Rock Whalers are a junior ice hockey team based in White Rock, British Columbia. They are members of the Pacific Junior Hockey League (PJHL). The Whalers play their home games at Centennial Arena.

== History ==
The Whalers joined the league in 2018–19 as an expansion team They played their first regular season game on September 8, 2018 against the Richmond Sockeyes. Matt Rogers was named as the franchises first ever captain.

In 2025, the league announced plans to promote the Chilliwack Jets, Coastal Tsunami, Delta Ice Hawks, Grandview Steelers, Langley Trappers, Richmond Sockeyes and Ridge Meadows Flames to a new Tier 1 division beginning in the 2025–26 season. Under the plan, the Abbotsford Pilots, Aldergrove Ironmen, Mission City Outlaws, North Vancouver Wolf Pack, Port Coquitlam Trailblazers, Port Moody Panthers, Surrey Knights and White Rock Whalers would remain as Tier 2, as well as a planned expansion team to be based in Cloverdale. However, when the plan was put to the franchise owners for a vote, it failed to pass by the required two-thirds majority, with 8 members voting for and 7 voting against. The vote was divided between the franchises that had been selected for promotion, who voted in favour of the motion, and those not selected for promotion, who voted against it.

In the 2025-26 season, the PJHL de-facto operated as two separate leagues, with no cross-play between the two. The Whalers won the Harold Brittain conference, defeating Mission 4 games to 1.

Despite the vote deadlock, the Tier 1 teams would eventually break away after the end of the 2025–26 season, joining the KIJHL to form the new British Columbia Hockey Conference. White Rock would remain in the PJHL, now reduced to only 8 teams.

== Season-by-season record ==
Note: GP = Games played, W = Wins, L = Losses, T = Ties, OTL = Overtime Losses, Pts = Points, GF = Goals for, GA = Goals against

Season	GP	W	L	T	OTL	Pts	GF	GA	Finish	Playoffs
2018–19	44	14	28	0	2	30	108	175	6th of 6 Shaw Conf; 10th of 12 PJHL	Did not Qualify
2019–20	44	24	18	0	2	50	136	146	4th of 6 Shaw Conf; 6th of 12 PJHL	Lost Conf Semi Finals, 1–4 (Wolf Pack)
2020–21	4	3	1	0	0	6	19	7	2nd of 6 Shaw Conf; 3rd of 12 PJHL	**Season Cancelled due to COVID-19
2021–22	44	27	16	0	1	55	161	140	4th of 6 Shaw Conf; 7th of 13 PJHL	Won Conf Semi Finals, 4–2 (Wolf Pack); Won Conf Finals, 4–2 (Ice Hawks); Lost League Finals 1–4 (Trappers)
2022–23	48	30	16	0	2	62	191	146	3rd of 6 Shaw Conf; 5th of 13 PJHL	Won Conf Semi Finals, 4–1 (Sockeyes); Lost Conf Finals, 1–4 (Ice Hawks)
2023–24	48	27	17	4	0	58	186	158	4th of 7 Shaw Conf; 6th of 14 PJHL	Won Conf Playin, 2–1 (Steelers); Lost Conf Semifinals, 0–4 (Sockeyes)
2024–25	48	29	14	5	0	63	206	166	3rd of 8 Shaw Conf; 5th of 15 PJHL	Lost Conf Semi Finals, 2–4 (Sockeyes)
2025–26	44	34	8	0	2	74	226	102	1st of 8 Brittain Conf 2nd of 16 PJHL	Won Conf quarter finals 4–0 (Ironmen)Won Conf semi-finals 4-1 (Cloverdale) Won PJHL Championship 4-1 (Outlaws)

== Playoffs ==
Season	Conference Quarterfinals	Conference Semifinals	Conference Finals	PJHL Championship
2018–19		Did not qualify		
2019–20		L, 1–4, Wolf Pack	—	—
2020–21		**Playoffs Cancelled due to COVID-19		
2021–22		W, 4–2, Wolf Pack	W, 4–2, Ice Hawks	L, 1–4, Trappers
2022–23		W, 4–1, Sockeyes	L, 1–4, Ice Hawks	
2023–24		W, 2–1, Steelers	L, 0–4, Sockeyes	
2024–25		L, 2–4, Sockeyes		
2025–26		W, 4-0, Ironmen	W, 4-1, Cloverdale	W, 4-1, Outlaws

== Awards and trophies ==
=== PJHL Championships ===
- 2025-26

PJHL Coach of the Year

- 2019–20 PJHL season | Jason Rogers
