= Cloverdale Junior Hockey Club =

Canadian junior ice hockey team

Cloverdale Jr. Hockey Club
- City: Cloverdale
- League: PJHL
- Conference: Harold Brittain
- Founded: 2025
- Home arena: Cloverdale Arena
- Colours: St. Patrick's blue Fire engine red
- Owner: Ronnie Paterson
- General manager: Adam Rossignol
- Head coach: Adam Rossignol
- Website: cloverdalejuniorhockey.ca

The Cloverdale Junior Hockey Club is a Junior ice hockey club and franchise of the Pacific Junior Hockey League (PJHL) based in Cloverdale, British Columbia. The club debuted as an expansion team in the 2025–26 PJHL season and plays its home games at Cloverdale Arena.

== Arena ==
The team plays its home games at Cloverdale Arena, which opened in 1972 and is owned by the City of Surrey. The team is expected to move to Cloverdale Sport and Ice Complex for the 2027–28 season.

== Brand ==
In its inaugural season, the team was known as the Cloverdale Jr. Hockey Club. The organization announced that it would seek public input and select a permanent name before the end of the 2025–26 season.

== History ==
The PJHL announced the establishment of the Cloverdale Jr. Hockey Club as an expansion franchise in 2025. The announcement came at a time when the league was undergoing a restructuring process aimed at splitting the league into two separate tiers beginning in the 2025–26 PJHL season. The proposed owner of the Cloverdale franchise, Ronald (Ronnie) Paterson, also founded and remained a partner of the White Rock Whalers. Paterson had previously been a part owner of the Richmond Sockeyes franchise and the Surrey Eagles of the BCHL as well. He was inducted into the British Columbia Hockey Hall of Fame in the "Builder" category in 2023.

Prior to opening day of the 2025–26 PJHL season, the league removed the club the game schedule and issued a statement that the Cloverdale franchise had "not been able to satisfy necessary league bylaws in order to operate as a member club in good standing". Subsequently, a lawsuit was filed on behalf of seven PJHL franchises alleging that the league acted in "an oppressive and unfairly prejudicial manner" in relation to the cancellation of the Cloverdale expansion.

In responding to the suit, the league stated that the club lacked an approved ownership structure and that there was a conflict of interest involving the White Rock Whalers franchise. The league cited its bylaw stating that that an existing governor or member cannot have any control or financial interest in a new team. The league also stated that the proposed owner had not presented any plan or ownership structure for the team and did not attend any of the required meetings. Further, the league believed that the proposed owner did not want to be a part of the PJHL.

On 18 September 2025, news media reported that the Cloverdale team had been reinstated.

=== Inaugural season ===
Cloverdale finished the 2025–26 regular season in 5th place in the Harold Brittain conference with a win-loss record of 24-18. They defeated the 4th place Abbotsford Pilots 4-games-to-2 in the first round of the playoffs. They were eliminated in the 2nd round after losing 4-games-to-1 to the White Rock Whalers.

Statistics
Season	GP	W	L	OTL	SOL	Pts	Regular season	Postseason
2025–26	44	24	18	0	2	50	5th in division 9th overall	Won first round against Abbotsford (4:2); Lost second round against White Rock (4:1)

Source: "PJHL standings". pjhl.net. Pacific Junior Hockey League.

== Sources ==
- "Q&A Time: Ronnie Paterson". pjhl.net. Pacific Junior Hockey League. 24 September 2022.
- Cheung, Matthew (9 June 2023). "Richmond Stories: Ronnie Paterson". richmondsentinel.ca.
- Jordan, Malin (11 March 2024). "Cloverdale Sport and Ice Complex opening delayed until 2025". Surrey Now-Leader. Black Press Media.
- Jordan, Malin (17 December 2024). "Cloverdale moves closer toward 3rd sheet of ice at new arena as expenditure limit raised". Surrey Now-Leader. Black Press Media.
- Ford, Elijah (15 May 2025). "Cloverdale receives its first junior hockey team in 40 years". BCIT News.
- "White Rock Whalers congratulate Adam Rossignol, Royce Rossignol and Brien Gemmell on leadership roles with new Cloverdale PJHL franchise". whiterockwhalers.ca (Press release). White Rock Whalers. 18 May 2025.
- "History – Cloverdale Minor Hockey Association". cloverdaleminorhockey.teamsnapsites.com.
- Jordan, Malin (29 July 2025). "Surrey mayor wants to enhance and build sports facilities across city". Cloverdale Reporter. Black Press Media.
- Jordan, Malin (5 September 2025). "PJHL Cloverdale franchise not connected to Barn upgrades or 3rd sheet at new rink: mayor". Surrey Now-Leader. Black Press Media.
- Jordan, Malin (9 September 2025). "'Devastation, shock': hockey coach opens up about PJHL political saga". Cloverdale Reporter. Black Press Media.
- Jordan, Malin (8 September 2025). "Cancel Cloverdale? Petition launched to save junior hockey team". Cloverdale Reporter. Black Press Media.
- "Surrey council approves $33.3M contract for 3rd sheet of ice in Cloverdale". Peace Arch News. Black Press Media. 30 September 2025.
- Jordan, Malin (25 June 2026). "Former Cloverdale HC manager looks forward to competing in new Junior A league". Peace Arch News.
