= Cloverdale Fairgrounds =

Fairgrounds in Surrey, British Columbia

Coordinates: 49.11432°N 122.73036°W

The Cloverdale Fairgrounds (also known as the Cloverdale Exhibition Grounds, the Cloverdale Rodeo Grounds, and commonly referred to as The 'Grounds) are located in the town of Cloverdale in Surrey, British Columbia. Since 1938, it has been the host site of one of Canada's largest rodeos, the Cloverdale Rodeo. The renowned Cloverdale Flea Market has been operating on the site since 1975.

== The Fairgrounds ==
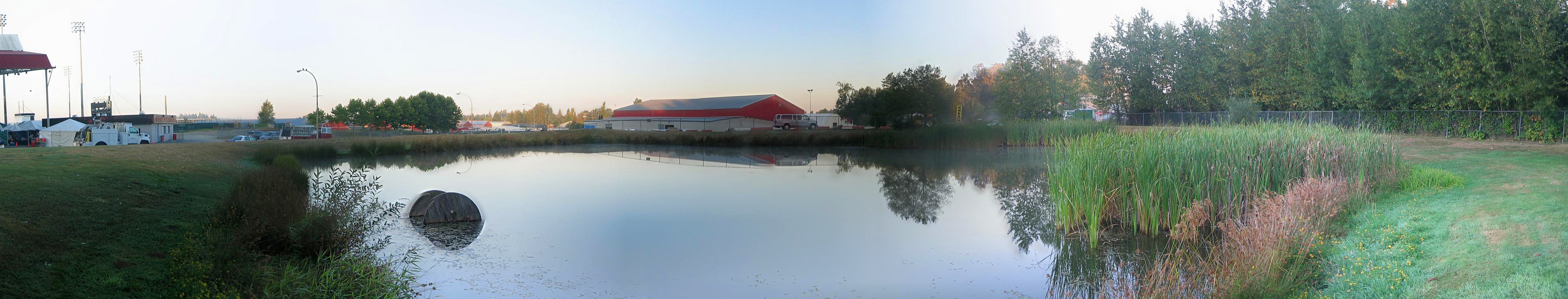
The Fairgrounds at dawn. To the left is the Stetson Bowl Stadium; the Show Barn (white) and the Agriplex (red) are at centre.

The Fairgrounds consist of approximately 138 acres (0.6 km^{2}) of land. It is bordered by 60th Avenue, 64th Avenue, 176th Street (which, in turn, is part of Highway 15, which leads to the United States), residential properties and Lord Tweedsmuir Secondary School. The Fraser Downs casino and racetrack leases 48 acres (190,000 m^{2}) of the Fairgrounds.

== Notable facilities ==
=== Agriplex ===
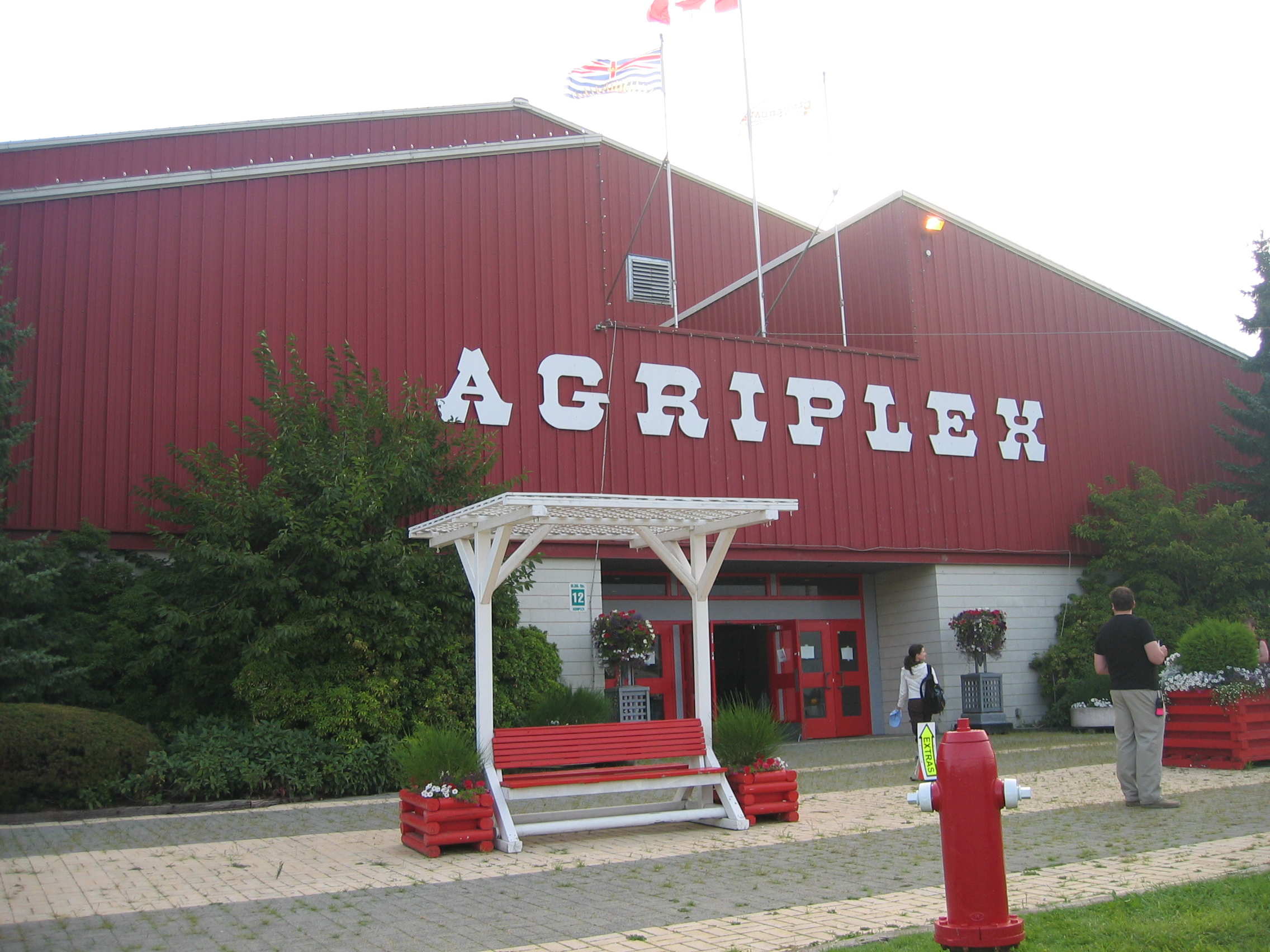
The Agriplex

This arena features a paved floor measuring 218 feet (66 m) by 103 feet (31 m). It can seat up to 1,530 spectators. It commonly hosts horse shows, concerts, trade shows, fundraisers and dances.

=== Alice McKay Building ===
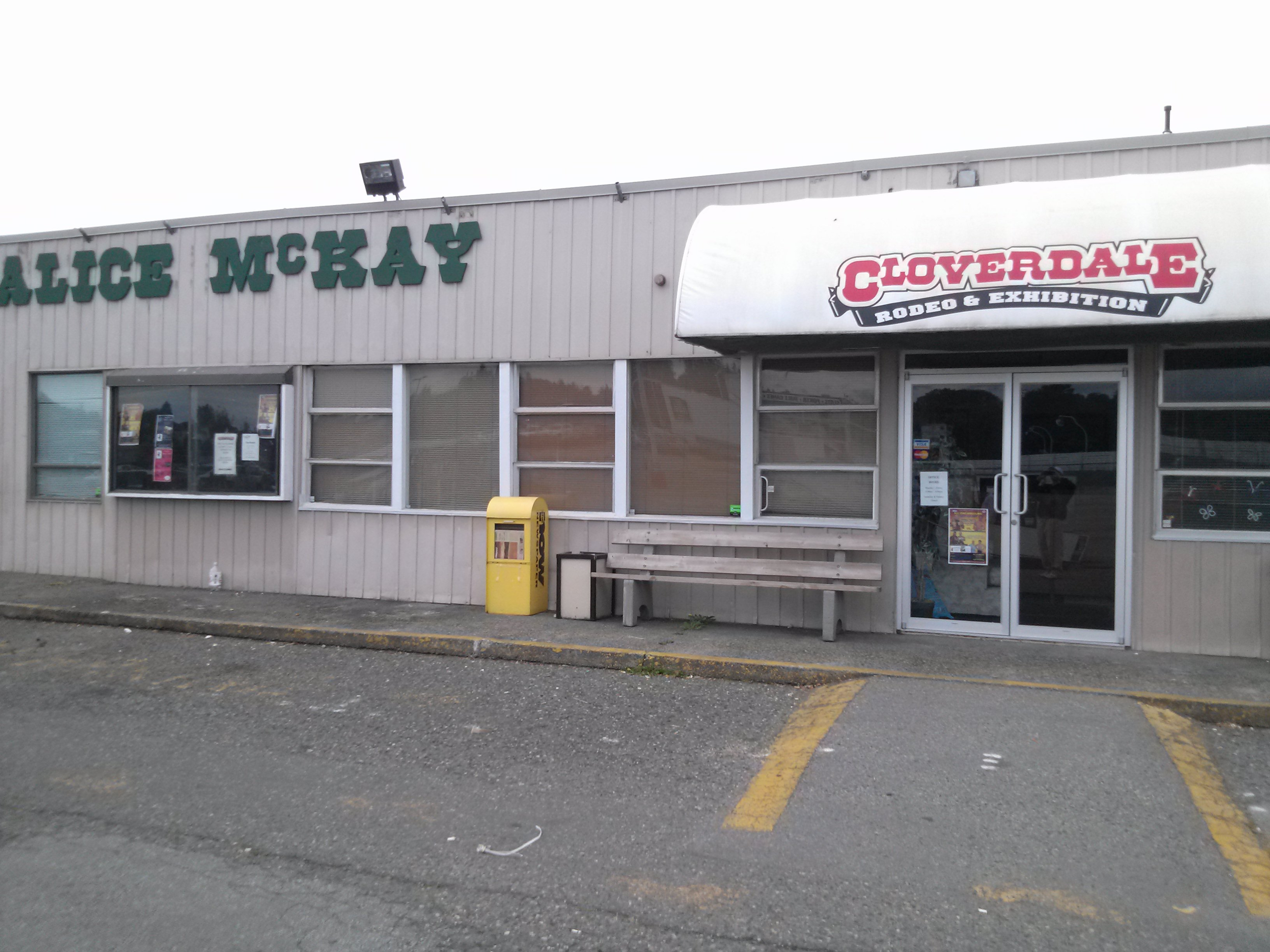
The Alice McKay Building

This building seats 350 people for banquets and 750 in the stands. It is commonly used for boxing, wrestling, dog training, swap meets and children's dances. The Fairgrounds' administration offices are located here.

=== Cloverdale Millennium Amphitheatre ===
The amphitheatre is located at the corner of 64th Avenue and 176th Street. It is commonly used for company picnics, festivals, dog shows and theatre groups. The city of Surrey has held Canada Day festivities there.

=== Stetson Bowl Stadium ===
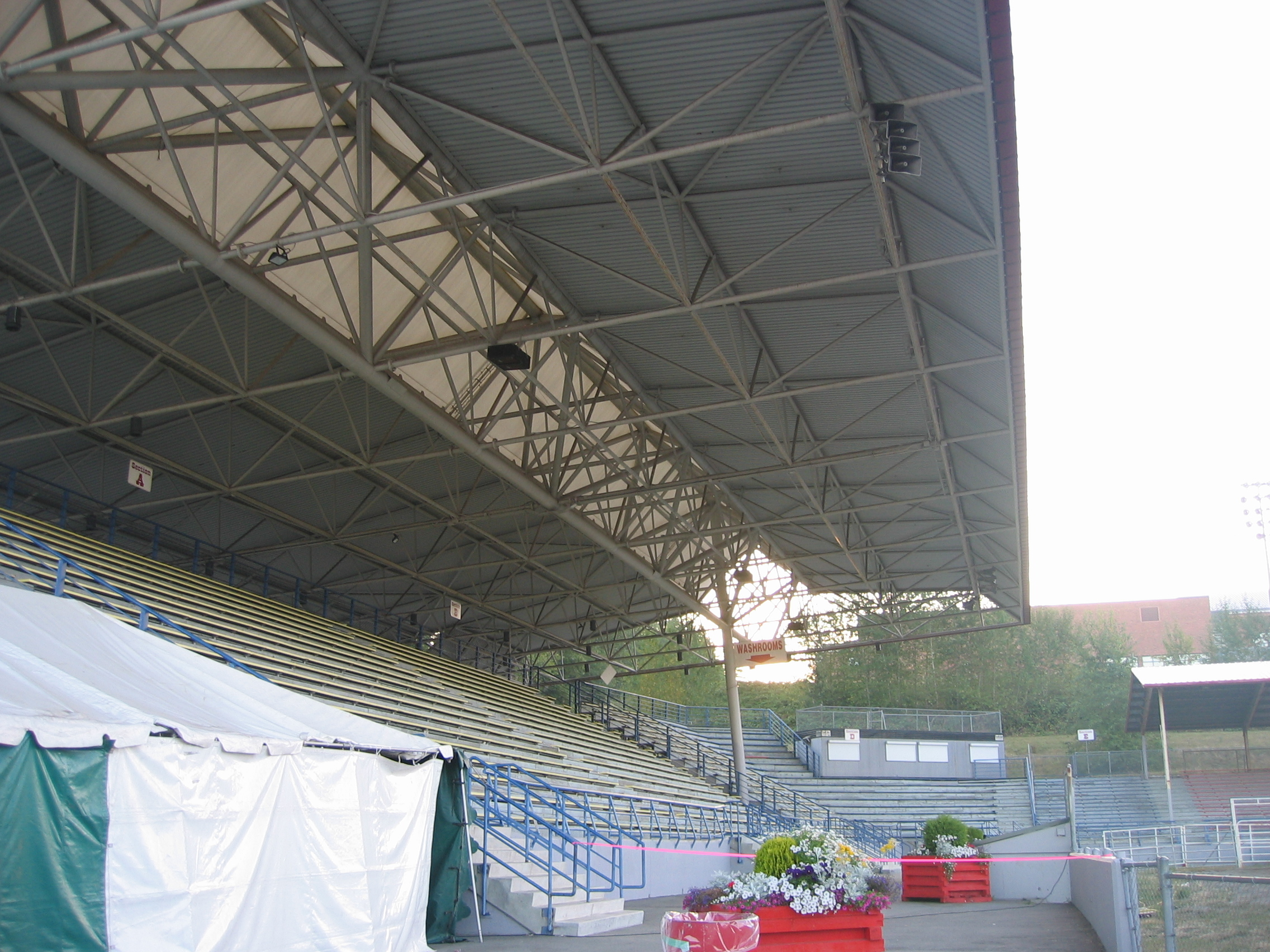
The Stetson Bowl Stadium

The Stetson Bowl Stadium is home to most of the Cloverdale Rodeo performances each year. Its total area is around 36,400 square feet (3,380 m^{2}) and its performance surface is made of sand. The bleachers can hold 4,000 spectators and portable seating can accommodate 800 additional spectators. Besides the rodeo, the stadium is commonly used for filming, festivals, concerts, sporting events and dog training classes.

=== Shannon Hall ===
This 7,000-square-foot (700 m^{2}) building houses 480 people for banquet-style seating and 700 for theatre-style seating. It is commonly used for weddings, dances, swap meets and memorials.

=== Show Barn ===
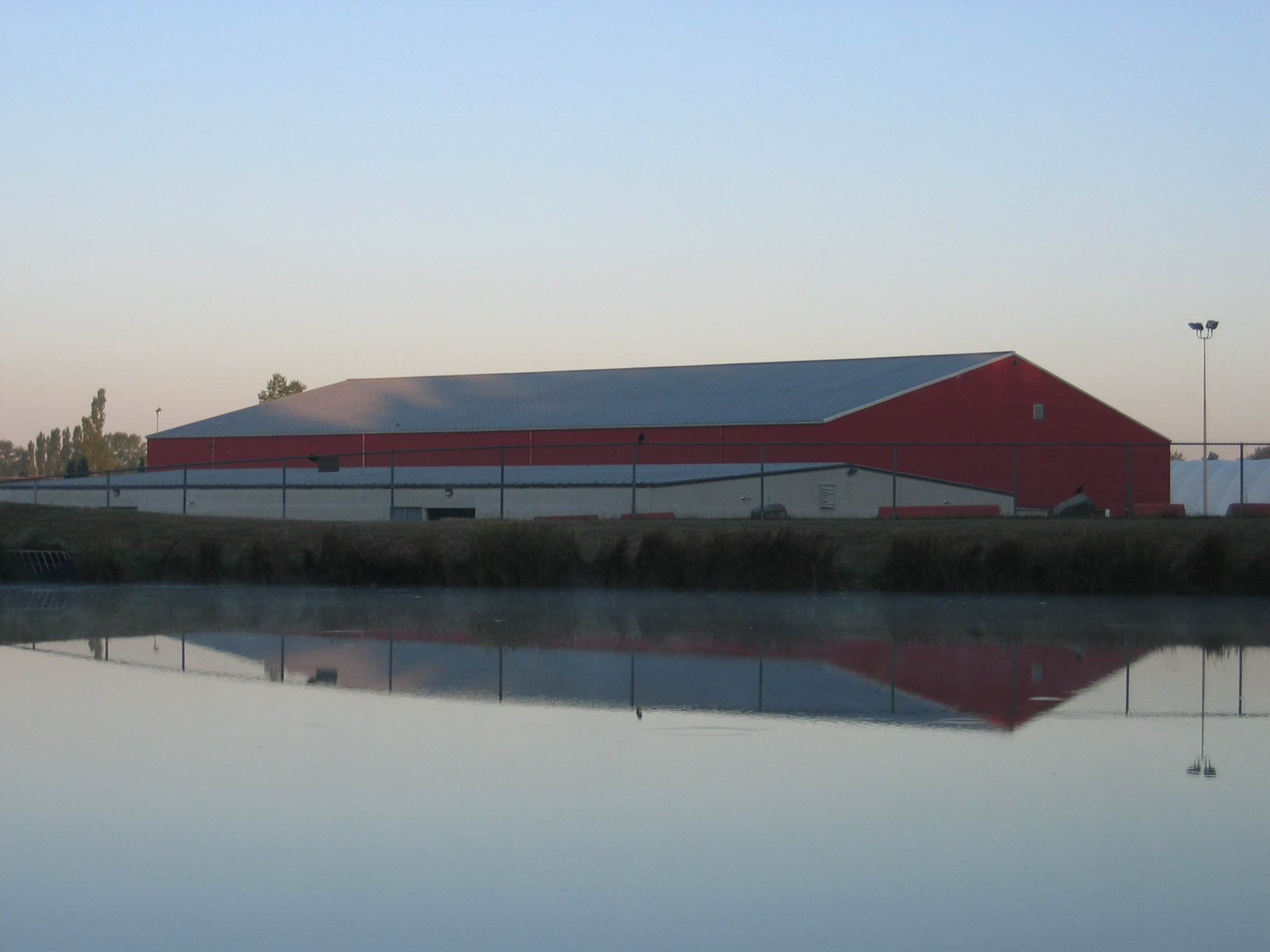
The Show Barn (white) and the Agriplex (red)

The Show Barn is an 18,000-square-foot (1,700 m^{2}) building that seats 750 people for banquets and 900 for its theatre-style seating. Commonly, it hosts kennel shows, trade shows and auctions. It also houses 89 horse stalls.

=== Cloverdale Arena ===
The Cloverdale Arena is a skating arena that is home to mostly ice hockey (including sledge hockey) and figure skating events, as well as the occasional concert and lacrosse game. It provides 15,000 square feet (1,400 m^{2}) of exhibition space and seats 250 spectators.

=== Cloverdale Sport & Ice Complex ===
The Cloverdale Sport & Ice Complex (currently under construction) will be a twin-rink facility that will be set up to accommodate many sports including ice hockey, figure skating, public skating lessons and public skating sessions, along with dry-floor summer use for sports such as lacrosse and ball hockey.

=== Elements Casino ===
Elements is a racetrack and casino located on the Fairgrounds but leased to the separately owned Great Canadian Entertainment, the second largest casino operator in British Columbia. There are harness racing events there nine months per year, from September to May. The last races were held on May 2nd, 2025 as Surrey City Council terminated the lease on August 15th, 2025.

== See also ==
- Cloverdale Rodeo and Country Fair
- Cloverdale, British Columbia
