= Stetson Bowl =

Stadium in Surrey, British Columbia

Coordinates: 49°6′54″N 122°43′37″W

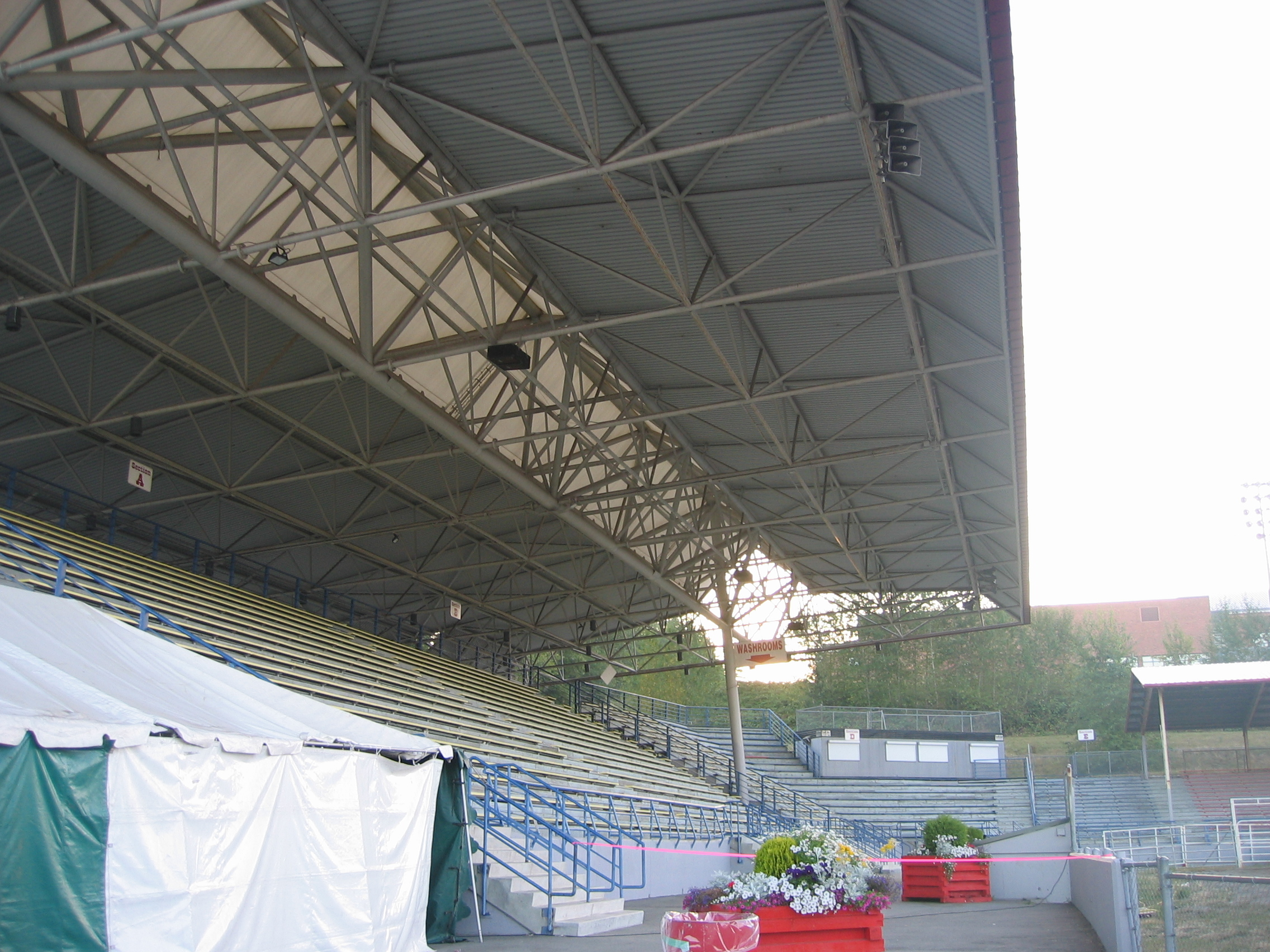
Stetson Bowl stadium.

Stetson Bowl is a stadium in Surrey, British Columbia, Canada built in 1988. Originally constructed as a temporary facility for the RCMP Musical Ride during Expo 86 in Vancouver, the structure was purchased by the City of Surrey, moved and reassembled in the Cloverdale Fairgrounds to house events during the Cloverdale Rodeo. The facility was reconfigured and upgraded to host AA minor league baseball and was the home field of the Surrey Glaciers of the Western Baseball League for the 1995 season. As a ballpark, the Stetson Bowl had a capacity of 5,000 people.

Today, it is the main venue of the Cloverdale Rodeo and Country Fair. "The Stetson Bowl Stadium is home to most of the Cloverdale Rodeo performances each year. Its total area is around 36,400 square feet (3,380 m^{2}) and its performance surface is made of sand. The bleachers can hold 4,000 spectators and portable seating can accommodate 800 additional spectators. Besides the rodeo, the stadium is commonly used for filming, festivals, concerts, sporting events and dog training classes."

The Surrey school board was petitioned by a local trustee in 2008 who argued that the Stetson Bowl should be used for more than a livestock and showdog display area. The petition seeks to transform The Stetson Bowl to more of a human sports stadium, so it could "be revitalized and used more effectively for community and school sporting activities".
