= Cloverdale Rodeo and Country Fair =

Rodeo and fair in Surrey, British Columbia, Canada

Coordinates: 49.11499°N 122.72706°W

Cloverdale Rodeo and Country Fair logo

Cloverdale Rodeo and Country Fair is an annual rodeo and fair located in the town of Cloverdale in Surrey, British Columbia. It is held annually at the Cloverdale Fairgrounds during the Victoria Day holiday weekend, from the Friday to Monday.

== History ==
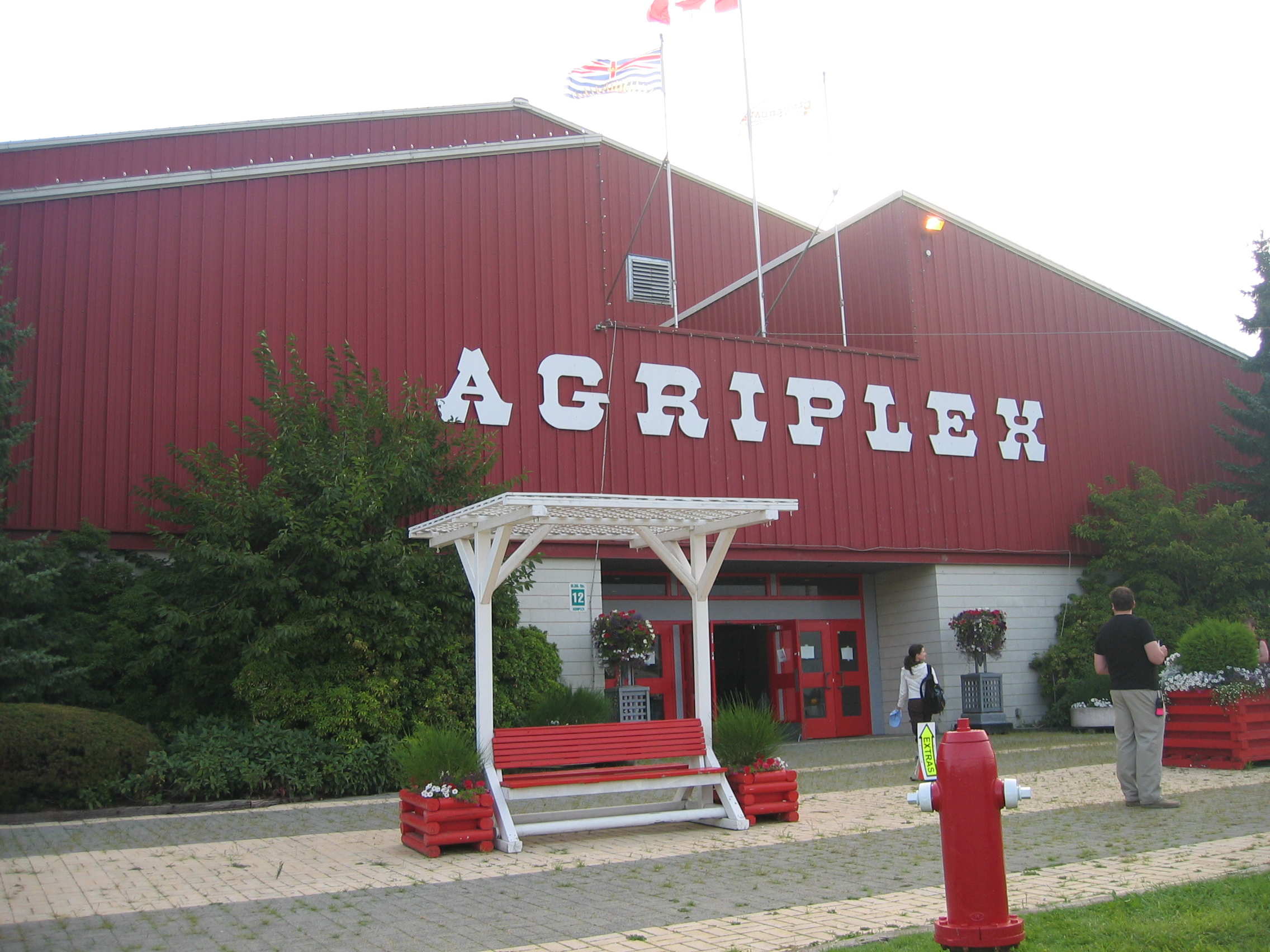
The Cloverdale Agriplex, one of the venues for the rodeo.

The fair was first held in September 1888 in the Surrey Municipal Hall and grounds. In 1938, the fair was moved to its current location at the Cloverdale Fairgrounds.

The rodeo was first held in 1945 and proved so popular that it was taken over by the Lower Fraser Valley Agricultural Association in 1947.

In 1962, the fair was taken over by the Fraser Valley Exhibition Society, and in 1994, the fair and rodeo were renamed the Cloverdale Rodeo & Exhibition Association.

In 1996, the 109-year-old annual fall fair was incorporated into the May rodeo weekend.

In 2007, after controversy over the death of a calf, the rodeo announced that it would drop four timed events, thus disqualifying itself from the Canadian Professional Rodeo Association (CPRA) circuit.

There was no fair and rodeo from 1917 to 1918 because of World War I and from 1942 to 1944 because of World War II. It was cancelled again from 2020 to 2022 because of COVID-19 restrictions. It returned in 2023.

== Events ==
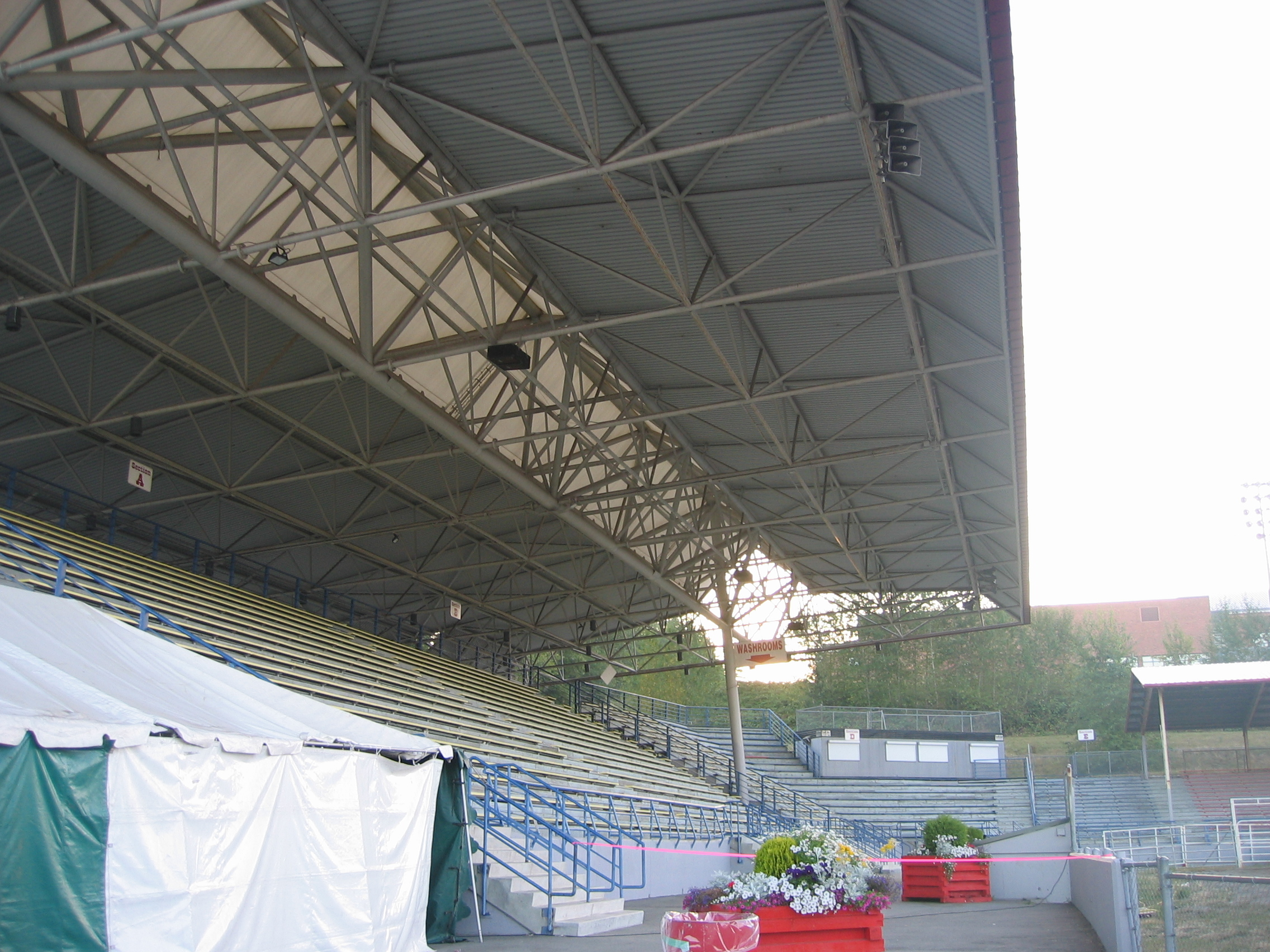
The Stetson Bowl Stadium, one of the rodeo venues.

There are cooking, baking and canning competitions, arts and crafts displays and horticulture and livestock exhibits.

Since 1977, on the Thursday before the Fair, there has been a bed race in downtown Cloverdale, sponsored by the Chamber of Commerce. The races went virtual in 2020–21.

A parade is held on the Saturday of the Fair, and a midway hosts games and rides.

For children, there are 4H club displays and children's entertainers.

Cloverdale Rodeo 2025 Event

The 2025 Cloverdale Rodeo and Country Fair took place from May 16 to 19. That year's fair featured new attractions including the South Gate Action Zone, Roll-A-Rama, and Lasso Lounge, along with over 50 musical performances across six stages.

== Controversy ==
The rodeo is an annual target of animal rights activists, who allege that bucking straps, electric prods, spurs and physical abuse are used to terrorize the animals into action. For the past several years, animal right activists have moved their protests into the arena, using banners and handcuffing themselves to the gates of bucking chutes.

In 2007, activists from Vancouver, British Columbia animal rights group Liberation BC entered the rodeo ring to protest the death of a calf in a roping event at the previous day's show. Pamela Anderson targeted the Cloverdale Rodeo that same year by writing a letter urging corporate sponsors to end their partnership with the rodeo, stating that "the calf roping event is particularly cruel". Following this controversy, the Cloverdale Rodeo announced that it would cut ties with the professional circuit by dropping four timed events including: tie-down roping, team roping, cowboy cow milking and steer wrestling; leaving the rodeo with the three roughstock events of bareback bronc riding, saddle bronc riding, and bull riding, as well as the remaining timed event of barrel racing. Cowboy cow milking was discontinued as a Canadian Professional Rodeo Association event after 2009.

== See also ==
- Cloverdale Fairgrounds
