= Liberation BC =

Canadian animal rights organization

Liberation BC logo

Liberation BC is a non-profit animal rights organization based in Vancouver, British Columbia, Canada, founded in 2004. It is run entirely by volunteers, including the board of directors, and has an e-mail network of nearly 4000 supporters. The stated mission of Liberation BC is "to expose animal exploitation through outreach and education, to promote a vegan lifestyle as the most effective and attainable way to protect animals, and to build and provide support for a strong community of effective animal advocates."

Liberation BC has been involved in several major campaigns since its beginning; from 2004 until 2007, it staged weekly demonstrations at local KFCs in conjunction with PETA's "Kentucky Fried Cruelty" campaign. This campaign ended when KFC Canada announced that it would improve its animal welfare standards.

During the winter of 2006-2007, its focus was on clothing chain Bebe for selling fur. In late 2007, Bebe announced that it would no longer sell fur products as of the winter of 2008. Liberation BC has also been involved in protests against the Cloverdale Rodeo, which in May 2007 dropped four of its major events after years of cruelty accusations from local animal rights groups. In May 2007, Liberation BC activists entered the rodeo ring with banners in an attempt to interrupt the rodeo, and were carried out by security guards and the Royal Canadian Mounted Police (RCMP). This action was repeated in August 2008 at the Abbotsford Rodeo.

Throughout 2008 and into 2009, Liberation BC focused on gathering support for a ban on foie gras in Vancouver, as well as general animal rights outreach at various community festivals and events. In March 2009, the group issued a letter requesting that Vancouver's "Greenest City Action Team" acknowledge the impact that meat consumption has upon the environment, and asked that they recommend that citizens reduce their consumption of animal products. The letter was also signed by the Vancouver Humane Society, Humane Society International Canada, Earthsave Canada, and the Lifeforce Foundation.

In 2009, the group shifted its focus to public outreach and to building a stronger animal rights community in Vancouver. It began the annual Cow Ribbon Campaign for Mother's Day. The public is encouraged to purchase Holstein-patterned ribbons from the website and wear them to start conversations about the conditions of mother cows and calves in the dairy industry. Online, individuals in the animal rights community place an image of the ribbon on their Twitter or Facebook profiles with a link to CowRibbon.com.

In 2010, Liberation BC began holding community dialogue events, using the "Unconference" and "World Cafe" models to do so. Every year since then, the group has organized the Vancouver Animal Advocacy Camp, a two-day event which typically brings about 100 attendees from the Pacific Northwest. In the past, the AAC has hosted speakers such as cookbook author Sarah Kramer, Lesley Fox of Fur Bearer Defenders, documentary filmmaker Liz Marshall, and Twyla Francois of Mercy for Animals Canada.

The group has also run a free film screening project since 2010. Titled "Eyes Wide Open", the project shows free animal rights films at the Vancouver Public Library and other public venues several times a year. Past films have included Forks Over Knives, Earthlings, Peaceable Kingdom, and Vegucated, among others. Volunteers are also involved in public outreach on a regular basis, holding information tables at many events in the Vancouver area, including farmers markets, environmental fairs, and local celebrations, as well as leafleting with the groups' own materials or with Vegan Outreach pamphlets. Volunteer nights are held monthly, allowing activists in the community to come together to write letters, prepare campaign materials, plan future events, and socialize.

From 2007 to 2013, Liberation BC hosted the annual Vancouver Walk for Farm Animals, which raises money for Farm Sanctuary. The group has also participated in the Worldwide Vegan Bake Sale annually since 2010, raising money for various animal advocacy groups, mostly local.

Liberation BC appeared in the December 2011 issue of VegNews as one of "10 Nonprofits You Need to Know".

In April 2013, the organization began holding weekly "Chicken Vigils" outside a Vancouver slaughterhouse in solidarity with the Toronto Pig Save and Cow Save projects, and has continued to do so into 2017.

== See also ==
- List of animal rights groups

== News articles ==
- Killing Snow Geese is not the solution, December 4, 2012
- Vancouver animal-rights group protests dairy industry, May 9, 2012
- 華裔家庭親身示範推純素食 逾百人溫市為農場動物請命, Sept. 26, 2010
- Controversy re-ignites for bear hunting season, August 31, 2010
- A Mother's Day story about milk cows and veal calves, May 7, 2010
- Ignoring animal rights while fighting for the environment is foolish, April 14, 2010
- Check your coats--not all faux fur is fake, Jan. 21, 2010
- A little bit of veal in every glass of milk, Nov. 16, 2009
- Where's the Lack of Beef?, May 29, 2009
- Understanding "cruelty-free" eggs, March 31, 2009
- Spare the Beef, Save the Planet, March 12, 2009
- Vancouver should cut down on meat for planet: animal rights groups, March 11, 2009
- The cruel truth about organic and free-range meat and dairy products, February 26, 2009
- Foie gras is a cruel dish best left unserved, January 14, 2009
- Animal rights group tries to gag foie gras, July 11, 2008
- Fur flies at Aberdeen Centre, December 21, 2007
- Minister sees red over protest plan, March 5, 2007
- Fur protest forces Bebe store to close, November 20, 2006
