= List of historic places in Surrey, British Columbia =

The following list includes all of the Canadian Register of Historic Places listings in Surrey, British Columbia.

Name	Address	Coordinates	Government recognition (CRHP №)	Wikidata ID	Image
1881 Town Hall	17635 60 Avenue; Surrey BC	49°06′42″N 122°44′02″W	Surrey municipality (5720)		Upload Photo
1912 Municipal Hall	17671 56th Avenue; Surrey BC	49°06′16″N 122°43′59″W	Surrey municipality (2655)		Upload Photo
Anderson Cabin	17635 60th Avenue; Surrey BC	49°06′43″N 122°44′02″W	Surrey municipality (5718)		Upload Photo
Arthur Hedley House	11927 96A Avenue; Surrey BC	49°10′41″N 122°53′32″W	Surrey municipality (19042)		Upload Photo
Avenue of Trees	Old McLellan Road; Surrey BC	49°06′30″N 122°45′43″W	Surrey municipality (1920)		Upload Photo
Bank of Montreal	5679 176 Street; Surrey BC	49°06′20″N 122°44′06″W	Surrey municipality (5688)		Upload Photo
Baron Von Mackensen House	9564 192 Street; Surrey BC	49°10′35″N 122°41′24″W	Surrey municipality (2598)		Upload Photo
Boothroyd House	16811 60th Avenue; Surrey BC	49°06′43″N 122°45′22″W	Surrey municipality (1925)		Upload Photo
Burkart House	13483 72 Avenue; Surrey BC	49°08′03″N 122°50′56″W	Surrey municipality (11421)		Upload Photo
Cecil Heppell House	5818 182 Street; Surrey BC	49°06′29″N 122°43′05″W	Surrey municipality (5689)		More images
Christ Church, Anglican	16613 Old McLellan Road; Surrey BC	49°06′30″N 122°45′42″W	Surrey municipality (1916)		Upload Photo
Clayton Elementary School	7541 184 Street; Surrey BC	49°08′23″N 122°42′50″W	Surrey municipality (11397)		Upload Photo
Clova Theatre	5732 176 Street; Surrey BC	49°06′24″N 122°44′06″W	Surrey municipality (5710)		More images
Cloverdale Elementary School	17857 56 Avenue; Surrey BC	49°06′17″N 122°43′41″W	Surrey municipality (5690)		More images
Cloverdale United Church	17553 58A Avenue; Surrey BC	49°06′33″N 122°44′10″W	Surrey municipality (5691)		More images
Colebrook United Church	5441 125A Street; Surrey BC	49°06′06″N 122°52′30″W	Surrey municipality (1935)		Upload Photo
Collishaw House	16520 40th Avenue; Surrey BC	49°04′26″N 122°45′54″W	Surrey municipality (1923)		Upload Photo
Creelman House	5678 182 Street; Surrey BC	49°06′20″N 122°43′05″W	Surrey municipality (5697)		More images
Crescent Park Annex	2378 124 Street; Surrey BC	49°02′43″N 122°52′41″W	Surrey municipality (11422)		Upload Photo
Crescent Road	Crescent Road; Surrey BC	49°03′38″N 122°50′56″W	Surrey municipality (2591)		Upload Photo
Daniel Johnson House	13951 Crescent Road; Surrey BC	49°04′05″N 122°50′10″W	Surrey municipality (1934)		Upload Photo
Dann's Electronics	5657 176 Street; Surrey BC	49°06′19″N 122°44′06″W	Surrey municipality (5707)		Upload Photo
Dr. Sinclair House	17725 58A Avenue; Surrey BC	49°06′32″N 122°43′52″W	Surrey municipality (5693)		Upload Photo
East Kensington Elementary School	2795 184 Street; Surrey BC	49°03′10″N 122°42′50″W	Surrey municipality (11413)		Upload Photo
Elgin Centre School	3530 144th Street; Surrey BC	49°03′57″N 122°49′19″W	Surrey municipality (2603)		Upload Photo
Elgin Hall	14250 Crescent Road; Surrey BC	49°04′01″N 122°49′37″W	Surrey municipality (1924)		Upload Photo
Ferguson House	14048 113A Avenue; Surrey BC	49°12′31″N 122°49′58″W	Surrey municipality (19066)		Upload Photo
Fleetwood Memorial Baptist Church	8590 160 Street; Surrey BC	49°09′32″N 122°46′41″W	Surrey municipality (11419)		Upload Photo
George Lawrence House	18431 Fraser Highway; Surrey BC	49°07′43″N 122°42′43″W	Surrey municipality (19067)		Upload Photo
Goodmanson Building	10449 King George Highway; Surrey BC	49°11′33″N 122°50′46″W	Surrey municipality (11398)		Upload Photo
Grandview Heights Elementary School Annex	17561 20 Avenue; Surrey BC	49°02′21″N 122°44′13″W	Surrey municipality (11414)		Upload Photo
Green Timbers Inaugural Plantation	140 St. and 96 Ave. Surrey BC	49°10′40″N 122°49′34″W	Surrey municipality (2602)		Upload Photo
Guy Richardson House	16940 Friesian Drive; Surrey BC	49°06′24″N 122°45′18″W	Surrey municipality (2654)		Upload Photo
Hazelmere United Church	1614 184th Street; Surrey BC	49°01′53″N 122°42′47″W	Surrey municipality (1915)		Upload Photo
Highway Garage	5723 176 Street; Surrey BC	49°06′23″N 122°44′06″W	Surrey municipality (5701)		Upload Photo
James Creighton House	10668 125B Street; Surrey BC	49°11′48″N 122°52′23″W	Surrey municipality (11453)		Upload Photo
James William White House	5962 180 Street; Surrey BC	49°06′39″N 122°43′23″W	Surrey municipality (5703)		Upload Photo
John Horner House	12645 14B Avenue; Surrey BC	49°01′45″N 122°52′18″W	Surrey municipality (19070)		Upload Photo
Kensington Prairie Elementary School	16824 32 Avenue; Surrey BC	49°03′36″N 122°45′18″W	Surrey municipality (11417)		Upload Photo
Kitzel House and Root House	216 184 Street; Surrey BC	49°00′24″N 122°42′43″W	Surrey municipality (11418)		Upload Photo
Latimer Residence	8534 192nd Street; Surrey BC	49°09′29″N 122°41′20″W	Surrey municipality (1922)		Upload Photo
Lorne Circus	Surrey BC	49°12′36″N 122°49′30″W	Surrey municipality (2596)		Upload Photo
Louis Dahl House	11334 River Road; Surrey BC	49°10′51″N 122°54′32″W	Surrey municipality (19065)		Upload Photo
Loyal Orange Lodge No. 1471 Hall	60th Avenue; Surrey BC	49°06′40″N 122°45′36″W	Surrey municipality (1914)		Upload Photo
Mound Farm	5202 168 Street; Surrey BC	49°05′49″N 122°45′04″W	Surrey municipality (2588)		Upload Photo
Mud Bay School	4382 King George Highway; Surrey BC	49°04′54″N 122°49′12″W	Surrey municipality (11416)		Upload Photo
Neville Curtis House	5658 182 Street; Surrey BC	49°06′19″N 122°43′05″W	Surrey municipality (5716)		Upload Photo
Ocean Park Community Hall	5658 182 Street; Surrey BC	49°01′51″N 122°52′03″W	Surrey municipality (19069)		Upload Photo
Old Anniedale School	9744 176th Street; Surrey BC	49°10′47″N 122°44′02″W	Surrey municipality (1917)		Upload Photo
Peace Arch	Highway 99; Surrey BC	49°00′13″N 122°45′25″W	British Columbia (18064), Surrey municipality (11452)		More images
Peace Arch Gazebo	16855 Peace Park Drive; Surrey BC	49°00′10″N 122°45′21″W	British Columbia (18078)		Upload Photo
Peace Arch Picnic Shelter	16855 Peace Park Drive; Surrey BC	49°00′14″N 122°45′29″W	British Columbia (18077)		Upload Photo
Pillath House	11113 148 Street; Surrey BC	49°12′16″N 122°48′47″W	Surrey municipality (2595)		Upload Photo
Port Kells Elementary School	19076 88 Avenue; Surrey BC	49°09′44″N 122°41′38″W	Surrey municipality (11415)		Upload Photo
Port Kells United Church and Manse	19131 88th Avenue; Surrey BC	49°09′50″N 122°41′31″W	Surrey municipality (11451)		Upload Photo
Red Cedar Stump	8920 Queen Mary Boulevard; Surrey BC	49°09′53″N 122°51′43″W	Surrey municipality (2592)		Upload Photo
Redwood Park	20th Avenue; Surrey BC	49°02′06″N 122°43′44″W	Surrey municipality (2653)		Upload Photo
Robert D. MacKenzie House 1922	5634 182 Street; Surrey BC	49°06′17″N 122°43′05″W	Surrey municipality (5712)		Upload Photo
Robert Dougal MacKenzie House	5418 184th Street; Surrey BC	49°06′03″N 122°42′43″W	Surrey municipality (1918)		Upload Photo
Rock Tree	12237 and 12245 91A Avenue; Surrey BC	49°10′11″N 122°53′02″W	Surrey municipality (5721)		Upload Photo
Ross House	17826 59A Avenue; Surrey BC	49°06′37″N 122°43′44″W	Surrey municipality (5704)		Upload Photo
Royal Oak Tree, Surrey Centre	Old McLellan Road; Surrey BC	49°06′32″N 122°45′40″W	Surrey municipality (1919)		Upload Photo
Royal Oak Trees, King George Highway	King George Highway; Surrey BC	49°04′26″N 122°49′26″W	Surrey municipality (2657)		Upload Photo
Samuel Howard Shannon House	5569 181A Street; Surrey BC	49°06′14″N 122°43′12″W	Surrey municipality (5708)		Upload Photo
Semiahmoo Trail	Surrey BC	49°03′10″N 122°48′40″W	Surrey municipality (1913)		Upload Photo
South Westminster School	12469 104 Avenue; Surrey BC	49°11′33″N 122°52′37″W	Surrey municipality (11399)		Upload Photo
St. Helen's Anglican Church	10787 128th Street; Surrey BC	49°11′56″N 122°52′08″W	Surrey municipality (2599)		Upload Photo
St. Mary's Ukrainian Greek-Orthodox Church	10765 135A Street; Surrey BC	49°11′54″N 122°50′53″W	Surrey municipality (2600)		Upload Photo
St. Oswald's Anglican Church	19016 96 Avenue; Surrey BC	49°10′36″N 122°41′46″W	Surrey municipality (2594)		
St. Oswald's Trees	190th Street; Surrey BC	49°10′35″N 122°41′46″W	Surrey municipality (2597)		Upload Photo
Stagecoach House	10658 125A Street; Surrey BC	49°11′47″N 122°52′30″W	Surrey municipality (2601)		Upload Photo
Stewart Farm	13723 Crescent Road; Surrey BC	49°03′54″N 122°50′35″W	Surrey municipality (2590)		Upload Photo
Strawberry Hill Farmers Institute Hall	12252 75A Avenue; Surrey BC	49°08′20″N 122°53′10″W	Surrey municipality (11420)		Upload Photo
Surrey Columbian Centennial Totem Pole	14245 56th Avenue; Surrey BC	49°06′23″N 122°49′37″W	Surrey municipality (2589)		Upload Photo
Thomas L. Lawrence House	5720 182 Street; Surrey BC	49°06′23″N 122°43′05″W	Surrey municipality (5694)		More images
Tynehead Community Hall	9568 168th Street; Surrey BC	49°10′35″N 122°45′22″W	Surrey municipality (1921)		Upload Photo
Tynehead Elementary School West Wing	8820 168 Street; Surrey BC	49°09′48″N 122°45′24″W	Surrey municipality (19068)		Upload Photo
W. Gillis House	6165 152 Street; Surrey BC	49°06′55″N 122°48′11″W	Surrey municipality (2587)		Upload Photo
Whiteley House	18076 58 Avenue; Surrey BC	49°06′27″N 122°43′19″W	Surrey municipality (5711)		Upload Photo
