= Squamish Wolf Pack =

Canadian junior hockey team

- City: Squamish, British Columbia, Canada
- League: Pacific International Junior Hockey League
- Conference: Tom Shaw
- Founded: 2008–09
- Home arena: Brennan Park Arena
- Colours: Blue, Silver, White
- General manager: (Canada) Matt Samson
- Head coach: (Canada) Matt Samson
- Website: www.squamishwolfpack.com/

Franchise history
- 2008-11: Squamish Wolf Pack
- 2011-Present: North Vancouver Wolf Pack

The Squamish Wolf Pack were a Junior "B" Ice Hockey team based in Squamish, British Columbia, Canada. In their last season (2010-11 PIJHL season), they were members of the Tom Shaw Conference of the Pacific International Junior Hockey League (PIJHL). They played their home games at Brennan Park Arena.

== History ==
The Squamish Wolf Pack were founded as a PIJHL expansion team in the 2008-09 PIJHL season, as a member of the Tom Shaw Conference. After three consecutive PIJHL unsuccessful seasons, and never qualified to make the PIJHL Playoffs, the Wolf Pack relocated from Squamish, British Columbia to North Vancouver, British Columbia in the 2011-12 PIJHL season, to be renamed as the North Vancouver Wolf Pack, due to unsuccessful fan base, sponsorship, standings and statistics, as they only won six games in their last PIJHL season (2010-11 PIJHL season).

== Season-by-season record ==
Note: GP = Games played, W = Wins, L = Losses, OTL = Overtime Losses, Pts = Points, GF = Goals for, GA = Goals against, PIM = Penalties in minutes

Season	GP	W	L	OTL	Pts	GF	GA	PIM	Finish	Playoffs
2008–09	48	14	30	4	32	122	237	1302	5th, Tom Shaw	Did not qualify
2009–10	48	16	26	6	38	164	212	801	5th, Tom Shaw	Did not qualify
2010–11	46	6	36	4	16	122	251	818	5th, Tom Shaw	Did not qualify
