= Cloverdale, Surrey =

Cloverdale
- Town centre of Surrey
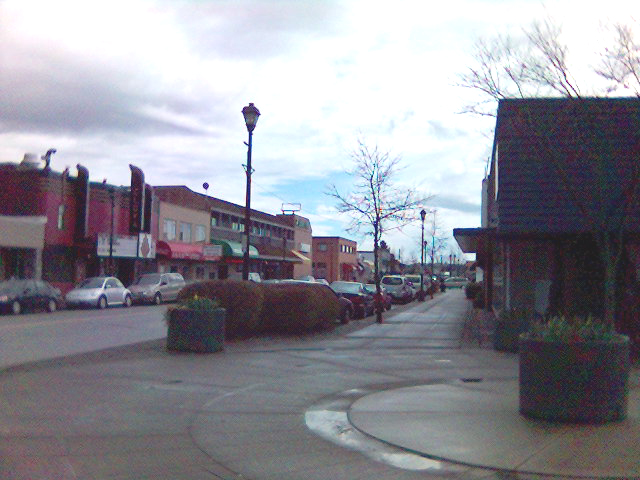
- 176 Street in historic Cloverdale

- Location of Cloverdale within Metro Vancouver
- Coordinates: 49.100°N 122.733°W
- Country: Canada
- Province: British Columbia
- Region: Lower Mainland
- Regional District: Metro Vancouver
- City: Surrey

Government
  - Mayor: Brenda Locke
  - MP (Fed.): Tamara Jansen (CPC)
  - MLA (Prov.): Elenore Sturko (BCC)

Population (2021)
  - Total: 75,355
- Time zone: UTC−8 (PST)
  - Summer (DST): UTC−7 (PDT)

Cloverdale is a town centre in the city of Surrey, British Columbia, a southeastern suburb of Greater Vancouver, located just west of the City of Langley. The town centre was initially founded as a small farm community in 1870 for its fertile land and temperate climate. Cloverdale eventually amalgamated into Surrey as one of its six town centres.

Cloverdale is known as a historic centre of Surrey, and is home to many heritage sites, including Christ Church, one of Surrey's oldest buildings (built in 1882). It is also the location of the City of Surrey's official museum.

== History ==
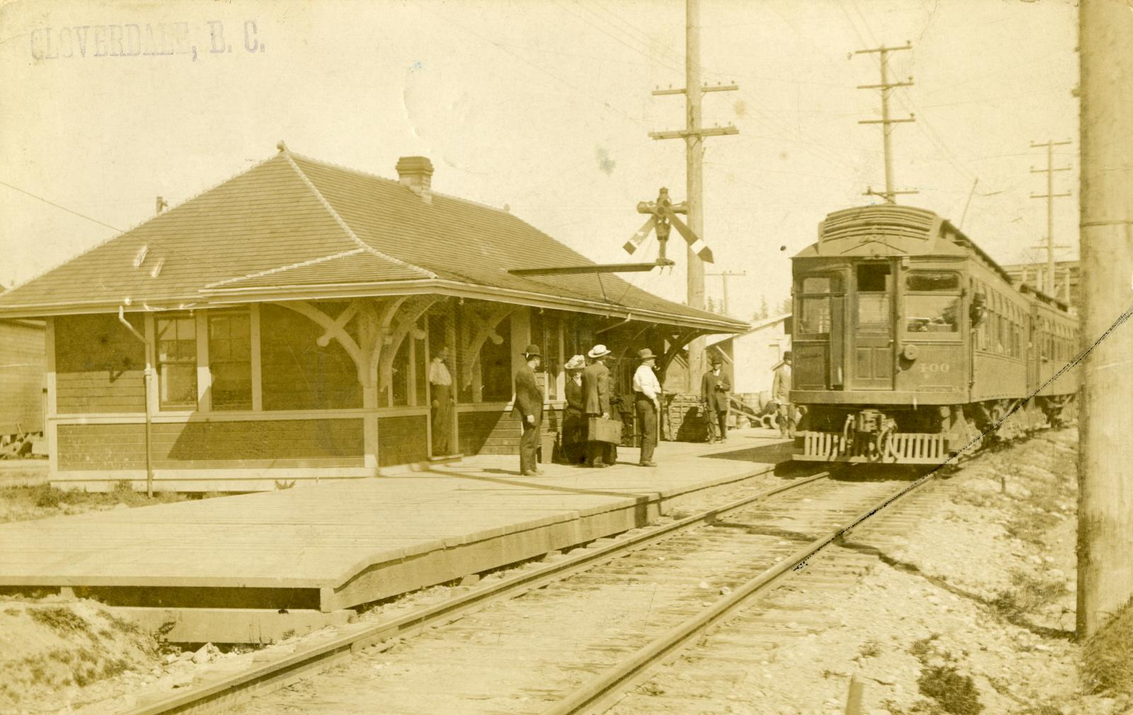
Cloverdale BC Electric Railway Station, 1911

William Shannon (1843–1928) was one of the first settlers to the Surrey Cloverdale region, buying 960 acres of land from the government in 1875. He was inspired to name the area from the clover that grew there in abundance.

Cloverdale was the City of Surrey's first town centre, officially established in 1879 near Five Corners, the historic intersection of 60 Avenue and Old McClellan Road. Adding railways was significant in developing the area. Linking Bellingham, Washington to New Westminster was the subsidiary of the Great Northern Railway forged in the valley in 1891 and created a station named Cloverdale.

In 1881, the first Surrey Town Hall was constructed there. In 1912, the Municipal Hall was built in the southwest corner of Cloverdale.

In 1882, Surrey's first school was established on land donated by Joseph Shannon.

In the 1920s and 1930s, Cloverdale was a common destination for Americans in Washington State seeking for alcohol to address the Prohibition laws.

In 1968, Cloverdale's population reached to 5,000. By 2016, the population stood at 65,645.

== Arts and culture ==
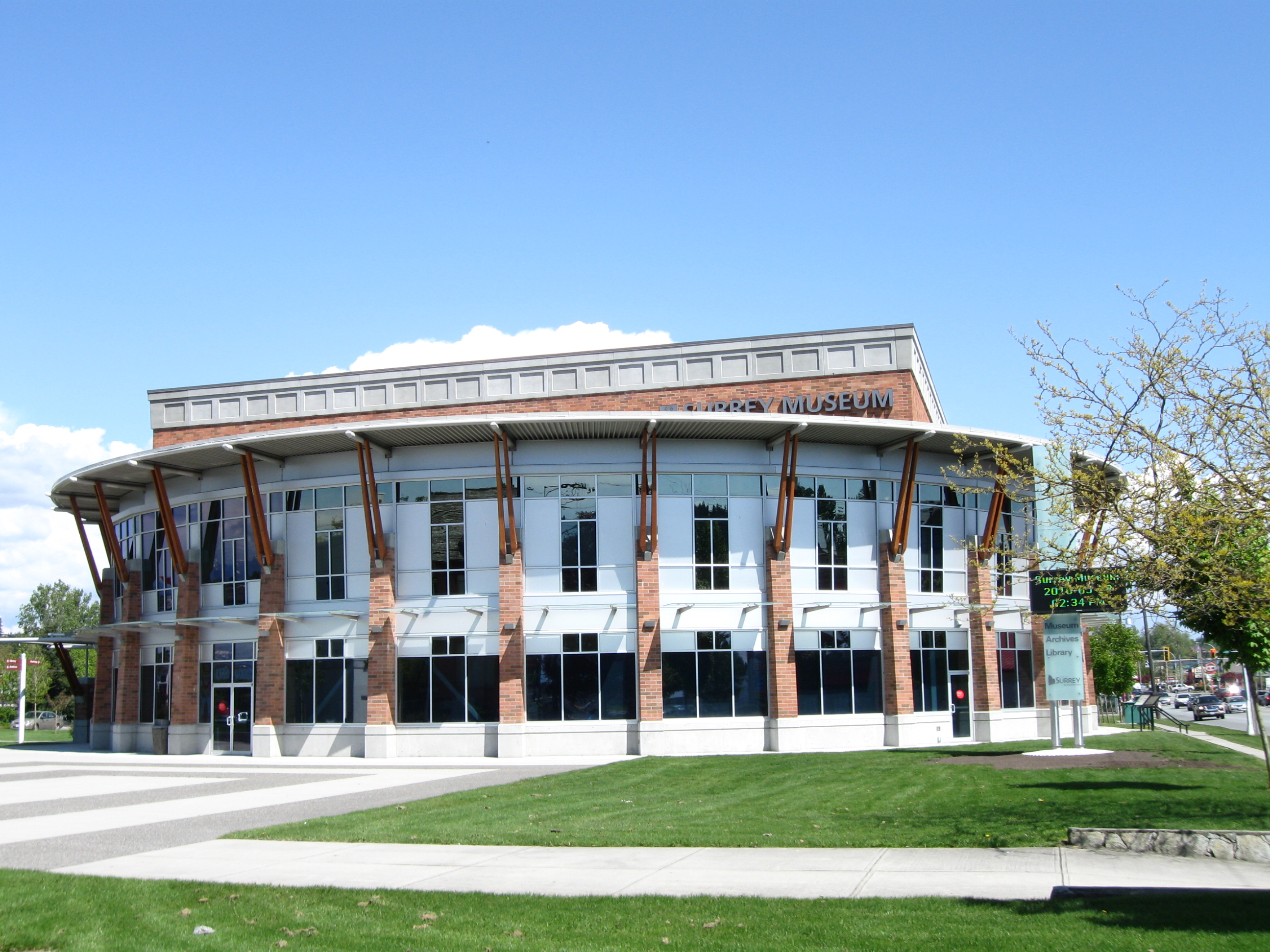
Surrey Museum is located in Cloverdale

Cloverdale includes a campus of Kwantlen Polytechnic University (KPU), called KPU Tech. It is the main campus for the Faculty of Trades and Technology at KPU.

Cloverdale's Canada Day events are the most popular in Western Canada. For example, 100,000 people were expected to attend the 2018 July 1 celebrations.

=== Film and television ===
Cloverdale is best known outside its immediate vicinity as the primary "main street" and "downtown" sets for the television show Smallville. A billboard once stood on the edge of the community that read, "Destination Cloverdale – Home of Smallville."

The community has been home to other filming, including one of Coca-Cola's Christmas commercials. Despite filming during summer, the town square was decked with Christmas decorations, including fake snow.

In June 2006, a film titled Deck The Halls was filmed, and the area was once again decorated in Christmas decorations and fake snow.

In September 2006 the feature film Postal was filmed in Cloverdale.

The 2007 film Hot Rod, starring Andy Samberg, was also filmed in Cloverdale. A portion of 176th Street was shut down to accommodate a riot scene and a motorcycle stunt involving jumping over fifteen school buses was filmed at the Cloverdale Fairgrounds.

In addition to being filmed there, the town of Cloverdale was a fictional setting of the Stargate Universe episode "Cloverdale".

In July 2012 and February 2016, the TV show Supernatural was filmed at Christ Church on Old McLellan Road.

Superman returned to Cloverdale with the CW show Superman & Lois which was filmed here from 2020–2024. The main street of Smallville this time was a set located near the Stetson Bowl on the Cloverdale Fairgrounds.

From March 2021 until July 2021, the HBO Max series Peacemaker was filmed in several different locations.

=== Music ===
The Cloverdale Fairgrounds was one of the North American stops of the 1994 Lollapalooza in August 1994. Featured performers were Smashing Pumpkins, The Beastie Boys, and A Tribe Called Quest.

=== Rodeo ===
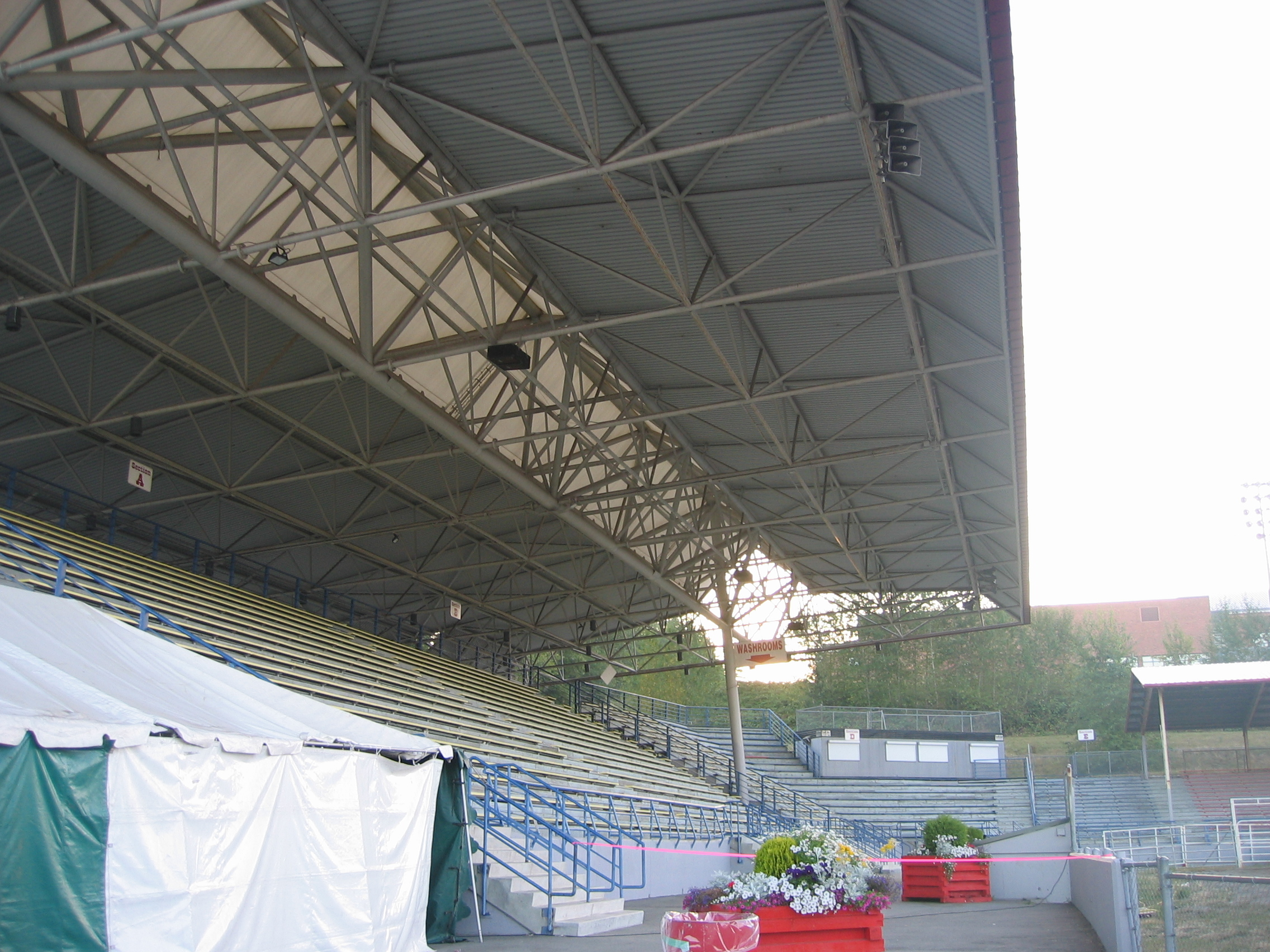
The Stetson Bowl Stadium, the main rodeo venue.

The yearly Cloverdale Rodeo and Country Fair, on the Victoria Day long weekend, attracts visitors from around western North America. It is the fifth-largest rodeo in Canada. Its location, the Cloverdale Fairgrounds, is also home to Fraser Downs, a popular racetrack and casino.

== Demographics ==
Ethnic groups in Cloverdale (2021) Source:		%
Ethnic group	Caucasian	57%
Ethnic group	South Asian	22%
Ethnic group	Filipino	5%
Ethnic group	Chinese	4%
Ethnic group	Other	
Total %	100%	

Languages spoken in Cloverdale (2016) Source:		%
Language	English	87%
Language	Punjabi	5%
Language	Korean	2%
Language	Mandarin	1%
Language	Spanish	1%
Language	Other	4%
Total %	100%	

== See also ==
- Surrey-Cloverdale, provincial electoral district
- Surrey-Serpentine River, provincial electoral district
- Cloverdale Fairgrounds
